= Simon Logan =

Radio presenter

- Born: 24 June 1968 (age 58); Southport, England
- Presenting career
- Stations: BBC Radio Newcastle, BBC Radio Tees (present), Radio Aire, Viking FM
- Style: radio presenter, actor, voice over, event host
- Country: United Kingdom

Simon Logan (born 24 June 1968) is an English radio presenter, DJ and actor, best known for his work on Radio Aire, Viking FM, BBC Radio Newcastle and BBC Radio Tees.

== Personal life ==
Logan was born 24 June 1968 in Southport and lives in Newcastle Upon Tyne. He attended Mostyn House School and later Stanley High School. Logan studied English Language at Oxford University. Logan is the nephew of British singer and musician Roger Whittaker. Logan made his first television appearance as a baby being weighed at just eight weeks old who was then carried by his mother in 1968 on a BBC programme called Back To Work.

== Career ==
Logan previously worked as an extra on television shows such as Coronation Street in the 1990s and then went on to work on as a children's club entertainer and then on cruise ships as a DJ. Logan perfected his craft in broadcasting in hospital radio which then led to a full-time career in broadcasting as a presenter for Viking FM, before becoming a breakfast show host on Radio Aire in 1998. At Radio Aire, Logan's co-presenters included Vicky Lockin, Katy Kaboom and Imogen Lamb. Logan hosted 'Party In The Park' in Leeds with the radio station, which had crowds of over 10,000 people and was co-hosted with Mel B from Spice Girls

Logan is currently a presenter on BBC Radio Newcastle and BBC Radio Tees, he joined Newcastle in 2009. Logan has hosted a variety of shows on the station, including weekend breakfast, evenings and an afternoon programme.

Logan presented Simon Logan's Fantastic 80s and 90s on BBC Radio Newcastle and BBC Radio Tees until August 2025. 'Ultimate 90s' and 'Solid Gold Sunday', a show he took over from Paddy MacDee. Logan's 80s and 90s programmes previously aired on BBC Radio Cumbria.

Logan presents a weekly Retro Top 40 Chart on Pride Radio (North East) each Saturday afternoon and Sunday morning. The show also airs on Dune Radio.

Logan's CD 'Simon's Greatest Windups Ever' was released in 2000, a compilation of prank phone calls on his radio programme for Radio Aire, previously known as Aire FM. The album was a success and reached the Official Charts. Logan visited local shopping centres and held CD album signings for thousands of listeners.

Logan has interviewed many guests over the years, such as Janet Jackson, Little Mix, Michaela Strachan and Paddy McAloon of Prefab Sprout.

In May 2025, Logan was featured in the Radio Times magazine, chatting about his career in radio in the Face Behind The Voice segment.

In August 2025, Logan's popular 80s vs 90s show ended due to BBC Local Radio cuts, sparking a petition which was signed by over 650 listeners campaigning to save the show. Logan thanked fans for their support on his last show, which aired on 31 August. He later returned to cover shows on BBC Newcastle and Tees.

== Awards ==
After joining Viking FM, Logan was awarded 'Best Newcomer' at the Sony Awards, with an award ceremony at the Grosvenor House Hotel in London. Logan was also nominated for 'Best Breakfast Show Host' as part of the breakfast show for Radio Aire.
