= Roger Tames =

English broadcaster and presenter

- Born: North East, England, UK
- Occupation(s): BBC Look North presenter, sports commentator

Roger Tames is a broadcaster, commentator and presenter who is best known for presenting sport on the north eastern version of the ITV regional news programme ITV Tyne Tees.

== Life and career ==
Tames joined ITV Tyne Tees in 1976 from the Dagenham Post, he spent 29 years as a sports presenter and then head of sport at ITV Tyne Tees and left in 2005.

Tames later joined Brendan Foster's Newcastle-based firm Nova International as a senior executive in its television production division.

Tames later became a sports commentator, he is well known for commentating on football games for Ayresome Park.

In 2015, Tames hosted Darlington Football Club Awards.

== Personal life ==
Tames attended University Of Leicester and received a BA Hons in English. He was previously married to former ITV Tyne Tees presenter Lyn Spencer.
