= BBC Radio Newcastle =

BBC local radio station for Newcastle, England

Coordinates: 54.9816°N 1.6348°W

- Newcastle upon Tyne; England
- Broadcast area: Tyne and Wear, Northumberland and north-east County Durham
- Frequencies: FM: 95.4 MHz (Tyne and Wear, County Durham and South Northumberland); FM: 96.0 MHz (Northumberland); FM: 103.7 MHz (Tyne Valley); FM: 104.4 MHz (Gateshead and Newcastle-upon-Tyne); DAB: 11C; Freeview: 711
- RDS: BBC NWCL

Programming
- Language: English
- Format: Local news, talk, music and sport

Ownership
- Owner: BBC Local Radio, BBC North East and Cumbria

History
- First air date: 2 January 1971
- Former frequencies: AM: 1458 kHz

Technical information
- Licensing authority: Ofcom

Links
- Website: www.bbc.co.uk/bbcnewcastle

BBC Radio Newcastle is the BBC's local radio station serving Newcastle upon Tyne, the neighbouring metropolitan boroughs, Northumberland and north east County Durham.

It broadcasts on FM, DAB, digital TV and via BBC Sounds from BBC studios on Barrack Road, Newcastle upon Tyne.

According to RAJAR, the station has a weekly audience of 234,000 listeners and a 4.6% share as of March 2025.

== Technical ==
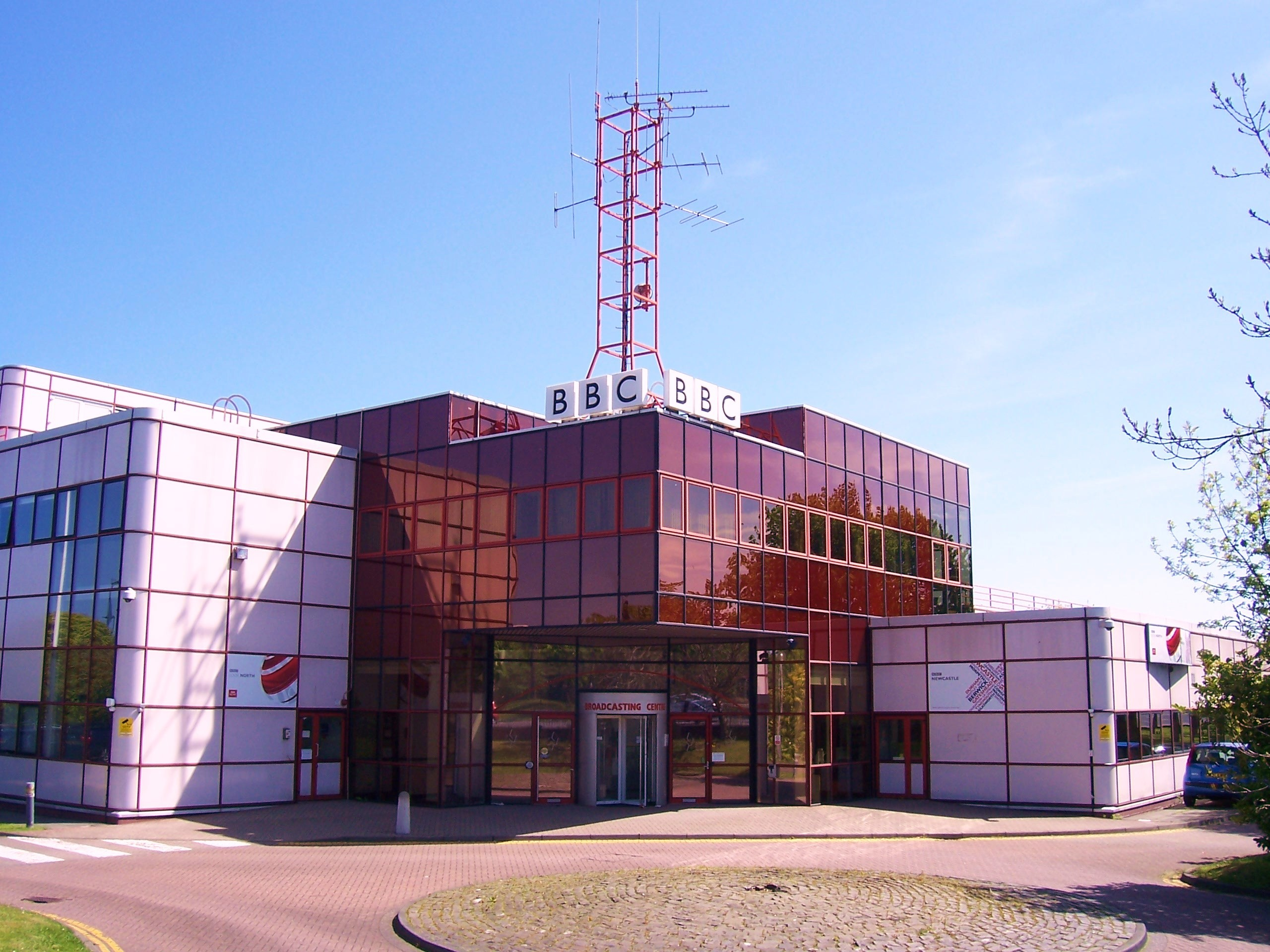
The "Pink Palace" - the Broadcasting Centre of BBC North East and Cumbria, including Radio Newcastle.

The Pontop Pike transmitter broadcasts the station's strongest FM signal on 95.4 MHz. The 96 MHz frequency from Chatton covers most of the populated areas of east Northumberland.

The Newton transmitter broadcasts on 103.7 MHz. The Fenham transmitter, broadcasting on 104.4 MHz, is situated close to the studios on Barrack Road and covers West Newcastle and Gateshead.

The DAB signal comes from Burnhope (near Consett), and also from Fenham (lower power), on the Bauer Digital Radio multiplex.

The station also broadcasts on Freeview TV channel 711 and streams online via BBC Sounds.

== BBC Radio Sunderland ==
In January 2021, BBC Radio Sunderland was launched as a temporary sister station. The service provided eight hours of opt-out programming for listeners in Sunderland and the surrounding area each weekday until March 2021.

== Programming ==
Local programming is produced and broadcast from the BBC's Newcastle studios from 06:00–14:00 on weekdays and for sports coverage, including Total Sport every weeknight from 18:00–20:00. Weekend programming from 06:00–18:00 and the Monday and Thursday evening programmes also broadcast locally.

The weekday afternoon show (14:00–18:00) comes from BBC Radio Tees in Middlesbrough. BBC Radio Newcastle carries the England-wide late show between 22:00 and 01:00. During the station's downtime, BBC Radio Newcastle simulcasts overnight programming from BBC Radio 5 Live.

== Notable presenters ==
- Anna Foster
- Marian Foster (Garden Mania)
- Ingrid Hagemann
- Alex Hall
- Railton Howes
- Alfie Joey
- Anne Leuchars
- Paddy MacDee
- Kathy Secker
- Lisa Shaw
- Sue Sweeney
- Frank Wappat
- Peter Grant
- Simon Logan (Simon Logan's Fantastic 80s)

== Sports commentators ==
The station's team of sports commentators includes John Anderson, Gary Bennett, Marco Gabbiadini and Matthew Raisbeck.
