= Frank Wappat =

English broadcaster and musician

- Birth name: Frank Wappat
- Born: 17 February 1930
- Origin: Hebburn, County Durham, England
- Died: 17 February 2014 (aged 84); Newcastle upon Tyne
- Occupation(s): Radio presenter and singer
- Years active: 1950s–2010
- Website: Official website

Frank Wappat (17 February 1930 – 17 February 2014) was an English radio personality, disc jockey and singer from Hebburn, County Durham. He worked with The Premier Band, Bobby Thompson, Renato Pagliari (of Renée And Renato fame), The Pipe-dreamers, Flintlock, The Dooleys and many others, in a career spanning from the 1950s to the 2010s.

== Biography ==
Wappat founded the Al Bowlly Circle, Memory Lane magazine, the British Band-Leaders Club and The Thirties Club. He was the longest serving presenter on BBC Radio Newcastle, having started in 1970, following his early broadcasting via Radio 390 on the Thames Estuary.

In 1999, he won a Sony Radio Academy Award for his Master Joe Peterson programme (a thirties music hall star whose real name was Mary O'Rourke), and in 2000, he won a second Sony award, for Investigative Journalism, with Wappat unearthing the truth about the death of 1940s singer Chick Henderson, later publishing a short biography of him.

Both his Gospel and Inspiration and Nostalgia shows continued on BBC Radio Newcastle, BBC Radio Humberside and BBC Radio York until August 2010, when Wappat decided to retire after 40 years. Commenting on this, he said, "The reality is that I can no longer give 110% to my radio shows, so I have sadly resigned from my broadcasting commitments. No one likes to make tough decisions and this one has been the hardest of my life". This came several months after Wappat suffered a stroke, which left him aphasia.

Wappat's son, Paul, was a radio presenter at BBC Radio Newcastle, before moving to 97.5 Smooth Radio in January 2008.

Frank Wappat died of heart failure on 17 February 2014, his 84th birthday, at the Royal Victoria Infirmary, Newcastle. He lived in Blyth with his wife, Susan.
