= Pontop Pike transmitting station =

Telecommunications and broadcasting facility in England

Pontop Pike
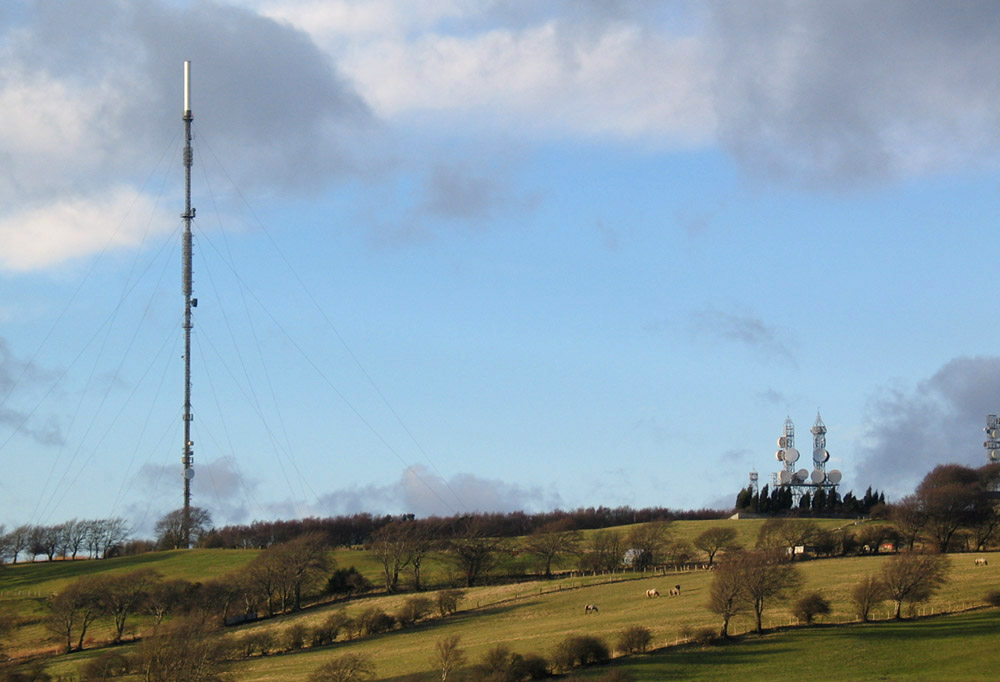
- Pontop Pike mast, left, with dish aerial array to the right

- Location within County Durham
- Mast height: 149 metres (489 ft)
- Coordinates: 54.8689°N 1.7711°W
- Grid reference: NZ148526
- Built: 1953
- BBC region: BBC North East and Cumbria
- ITV region: ITV Tyne Tees
- Local TV service: LOCAL TV Tyne & Wear

The Pontop Pike transmitting station is a facility for telecommunications and broadcasting situated on a 312-metre (1,024 ft) high hill of the same name between Stanley and Consett, County Durham, near the village of Dipton, England. The mast is 149 metres (489 ft) high, giving an average antenna height of 461 metres (1,512 ft) above sea level. It is owned and operated by Arqiva.

== History ==
The mast was built in 1953, by BICC with Rowridge (also 500 feet (150 m)) and North Hessary Tor in Devon (650 feet (200 m)).

Its construction was brought forward by the BBC so that people in North East England could watch the Coronation of Queen Elizabeth II live on the 405-line television system VHF then in use in the UK. Test transmissions from a low-power temporary aerial began on Monday, 20 April 1953, and the first programmes were transmitted on Friday, 1 May 1953, in plenty of time for the Coronation on 2 June. UHF transmissions began in 1966 with the first colour transmissions in 1970, and the VHF television signal was switched off in 1985.

It suffered a fire in late May 1973.

== Transmission ==
=== Radio ===
VHF sound broadcasting began on 20 December 1955, with Wenvoe in Wales, on the same current FM frequencies. Only Wrotham in Kent had VHF sound before.

95.4FM Radio Newcastle broadcast from 2 January 1971.

=== Television ===
BBC television Northern News, from Manchester, was first broadcast in early January 1959, with the Sandale transmitting station in Cumbria.

BBC2 began broadcasting on 5 November 1966 to reach 1.7m viewers, with tests from 22 October 1966.

BBC2 colour began on 2 December 1967. BBC1 colour tests began on 30 May 1970, with a full service from 20 June 1970. ITV colour began from 17 July 1970.

== Coverage ==
The Pontop Pike transmitter provides digital television transmissions to Tyne and Wear, County Durham, Tees Valley, most of Northumberland and parts of North Yorkshire. This includes the cities of Newcastle, Durham and Sunderland. It also carries the national BBC Radio FM signals, covering the whole North East, as well as 95.4 MHz FM BBC Newcastle. It was one of the first national FM transmitters in December 1955. All of its television output is within the C/D aerial group.

== Digital TV switchover ==
Analogue TV transmissions from this mast began to close from 12 September 2012 and completely ceased on 26 September that year, making Pontop Pike, alongside Bilsdale and Chatton, the last-but-one transmitter group in the United Kingdom to complete digital switchover (DSO) with Northern Ireland being the last area to switch. In July 2007 it was confirmed by Ofcom that Pontop Pike would remain a C/D group after DSO.

Pontop Pike underwent its 700 MHz clearance between September and November 2019 when its output moved down the band from a C/D group to a K group. Thus, people with original C/D group aerials, who live in poor reception areas, may struggle to pick up some channels.

== Services listed by frequency ==
=== Analogue radio ===
Frequency	kW	Service
88.5 MHz	250	BBC Radio 2
90.7 MHz	250	BBC Radio 3
92.9 MHz	250	BBC Radio 4
95.4 MHz	10	BBC Radio Newcastle
98.1 MHz	250	BBC Radio 1
100.3 MHz	65	Classic FM

=== Digital radio ===
Frequency	Block	kW	Operator
222.064 MHz	11D	6.3	Digital One
225.648 MHz	12B	10	BBC National DAB

=== Digital television ===
Frequency	UHF	kW	Operator	System
562.000 MHz	32	100	COM4 (SDN)	DVB-T
570.000 MHz	33	5	LTVmux	DVB-T
578.000 MHz	34	100	COM5 (Arqiva A)	DVB-T
586.000 MHz	35	100	COM6 (Arqiva B)	DVB-T
618.000 MHz	39	100	PSB1 (BBC A)	DVB-T
642.000 MHz	42	100	PSB2 (D3&4)	DVB-T
666.000 MHz	45	100	PSB3 (BBC B)	DVB-T2
746.000 MHz	55	19.498	COM7 (Arqiva C)	DVB-T2

==== Before 700 MHz clearance ====
Frequency	UHF	kW	Operator	System
570.000 MHz	33	33.8	COM7 (ARQ C)	DVB-T2
578.000 MHz	34	9.5	COM8 (ARQ D)	DVB-T2
698.000 MHz	49	100	PSB3 (BBC B)	DVB-T2
706.000 MHz	50	50	COM4 (SDN)	DVB-T
738.000 MHz	54	100	PSB2 (D3&4)	DVB-T
746.000 MHz	55	50	COM6 (ARQ B)	DVB-T
754.000 MHz	56	5	LTVmux	DVB-T
770.000 MHz	58	100	PSB1 (BBC A)	DVB-T
778.000 MHz	59	50	COM5 (ARQ A)	DVB-T

==== Before switchover ====
Frequency	UHF	kW	Operator	System
690.000 MHz	48	10	BBC (Mux 1)	DVB-T
729.833 MHz	53-	10	Arqiva (Mux D)	DVB-T
746.166 MHz	55+	10	Digital 3&4 (Mux 2)	DVB-T
778.166 MHz	59+	10	SDN (Mux A)	DVB-T
802.166 MHz	62+	10	BBC (Mux B)	DVB-T
810.000 MHz	63	10	BBC B (Mux HD)	DVB-T2
826.166 MHz	65+	10	Arqiva (Mux C)	DVB-T

=== Analogue television ===
Analogue television from Pontop Pike has now ceased permanently. BBC2 analogue was switched off on 12 September 2012 and the remaining three on 26 September 2012. Pontop Pike never transmitted analogue Channel 5. Instead it was transmitted from Burnhope on UHF 68.

Frequency	UHF	kW	Service
735.25 MHz	54	500	Channel 4
767.25 MHz	58	500	BBC1 North East
791.25 MHz	61	500	Tyne Tees
815.25 MHz	64	500	BBC2 North East

== Relay services ==
Being the main broadcasting transmitter, there are also a number of relays (or repeaters) to cover patches where this transmitter can't properly serve.

=== Analogue radio ===
Transmitter	kW	R1	R2	R3	R4	CFM
Bilsdale	5	98.6 MHz	89.0 MHz	91.2 MHz	93.4 MHz	101.6 MHz
Fenham	0.042	99.4 MHz	89.8 MHz	92.0 MHz	94.2 MHz	101.0 MHz
Newton	0.1	99.0 MHz	89.4 MHz	91.6 MHz	93.8 MHz	—N/a
Weardale	0.18	99.3 MHz	89.7 MHz	91.9 MHz	94.1 MHz	—N/a
Wensleydale	0.054	97.9 MHz	88.3 MHz	90.5 MHz	92.7 MHz	—N/a
Woolmoor	5	99.6 MHz	90.2 MHz	92.2 MHz	94.4 MHz	—N/a

=== Digital television ===
The following is a list of the television relays served by Pontop Pike:

Transmitter	kW	BBCA	BBCB	D3&4	SDN	ARQA	ARQB	Pol.	A.G.
Allenheads	0.002	27	21	24	—N/a	—N/a	—N/a	V	A K
Alston	0.08	33	48	36	—N/a	—N/a	—N/a	V	B K
Bellingham	0.02	27	21	24	—N/a	—N/a	—N/a	V	A K
Blaydon Burn	0.002	44	47	41	—N/a	—N/a	—N/a	V	B K
Byrness	0.01	27	21	24	—N/a	—N/a	—N/a	V	A K
Catton Beacon	0.028	40	46	43	—N/a	—N/a	—N/a	V	B K
Durham	0.003	41	47	44	—N/a	—N/a	—N/a	V	B K
Esh	0.0024	29	37	31	—N/a	—N/a	—N/a	V	A K
Falstone	0.004	44	47	41	—N/a	—N/a	—N/a	V	B K
Felling	0.002	40	43	46	—N/a	—N/a	—N/a	V	B K
Fenham	0.4	23	30	26	25	22	28	V	A K
Haltwhistle	0.4	21	37	31	—N/a	—N/a	—N/a	V	A K
Haydon Bridge	0.02	44	41	47	—N/a	—N/a	—N/a	V	B K
Hedleyhope	0.004	41	47	44	—N/a	—N/a	—N/a	V	B K
Humshaugh	0.0118	29	37	31	—N/a	—N/a	—N/a	V	A K
Ireshopeburn	0.0022	29	37	31	—N/a	—N/a	—N/a	V	A K
Kielder	0.0054	26	23	29	—N/a	—N/a	—N/a	V	A K
Morpeth	0.0088	22	28	25	—N/a	—N/a	—N/a	V	A K
Newton	0.4	21	27	24	—N/a	—N/a	—N/a	V	A K
Seaham	0.059	41	47	44	—N/a	—N/a	—N/a	V	B K
Shotleyfield	0.04	22	28	25	—N/a	—N/a	—N/a	V	A K
Staithes	0.004	33	48	36	—N/a	—N/a	—N/a	V	K
Sunderland	0.006	41	47	44	—N/a	—N/a	—N/a	V	B K
Wall	0.0042	40	46	43	—N/a	—N/a	—N/a	H	B K
Weardale	0.2	44	41	47	—N/a	—N/a	—N/a	V	B K
Whitaside	0.0025	44	41	47	—N/a	—N/a	—N/a	V	B K

== See also ==
- List of masts
- List of radio stations in the United Kingdom
