= Razzmatazz (British TV series) =

British children's television series

Razzmatazz is a music-based children's television programme that ran on ITV between 2 June 1981 and 2 January 1987.

Razzmatazz was produced by Tyne Tees Television for Children's ITV with presenters Alastair Pirrie and Lyn Spencer. Later presenters included Brendan Healy, Suzanne Dando and singer Lisa Stansfield, who joined the programme when she was 16.

Razzmatazz had the latest pop acts who performed their current single, interspersed with games and other items such as cooking. The show was recorded in Newcastle with the audience largely made up of pupils from nearby schools. Acts appearing on the show included Kate Bush, David Essex, Chas and Dave, Adam and the Ants, Altered Images, Dead or Alive, Lynsey de Paul, Madness, Kim Wilde, Bucks Fizz, Seona Dancing and General Public.

== Episodes ==
- Series 1: 13 editions – 2 June 1981 – 25 August 1981
- New Year Special – 1 January 1982
- Series 2: 13 editions 5 February 1982 – 7 May 1982
- Series 3: 16 editions – 14 September 1982 – 31 December 1982
- Series 4: 13 editions – 5 April 1983 – 28 June 1983
- Rock & Pop Awards Special – 19 July 1983
- Series 5: 14 editions – 1 November 1983 – 8 February 1984
- Series 6: 14 editions – 11 April 1984 – 18 July 1984
- Series 7: 14 editions – 24 October 1984 – 30 January 1985
- Series 8: 14 editions – 27 March 1985 – 14 August 1985
- Christmas Special – 23 December 1985
- Series 9: 12 editions 11 June 1986 – 3 September 1986
- Christmas Special – 17 December 1986
- New Year Special – 2 January 1987
