= Marian Foster =

English television and radio presenter

- Born: 19 March 1943 (age 83); Newcastle upon Tyne, England
- Presenting career
- Show: Pebble Mill at One, Top Gear, BBC Look North, ITV Tyne Tees
- Stations: BBC Radio 2, BBC Radio 4
- Stations: BBC Radio Newcastle and BBC Radio Tees (present)
- Style: Television and radio presenter
- Country: United Kingdom

Marian Foster (born 19 March 1943) is an English television and radio presenter from Newcastle upon Tyne. She is best known for presenting BBC One's Pebble Mill at One from 1972 to 1986, and currently Garden Mania on BBC Radio Newcastle and BBC Radio Tees.

== Early life and education ==
Foster was educated at Dame Allan's School, Newcastle upon Tyne. Her father was a Tyneside sailor, and she learned how to steer a huge cargo boat before she could drive. At Newcastle University, she was the president of the Gilbert and Sullivan society; she studied geography then completed a Diploma of Education, training at Heaton High School. Whilst in her last year at university, she worked with Bob Langley at Tyne Tees Television. More recently, when Foster was in her 60s, she completed a BSc degree and diploma in Horticulture, and at the age of 77 gained another degree in the same subject, after she was inspired to learn more through presenting her gardening programme Garden Mania. Foster lives in Northumberland.

She was trained as a music teacher and sang with the London Symphony Chorus and Royal Northern Sinfornia.

== Career ==
In the 1960s, Foster was one of ITV's first women reporters, news readers and the first of three weather girls for ITV Tyne Tees. Foster is most notable for presenting the BBC1 afternoon chat show Pebble Mill at One for fourteen years, from 1972 to 1986 alongside Bob Langley and Donny MacLeod. During her time on the programme, she interviewed many celebrities, introduced various different segments and even had a rose named after her called 'The Marian Foster Rose'. She was voted viewers' favourite while on the show. In 1981, she met Queen Elizabeth II at the Pebble Mill studios in Birmingham and was later invited to interview Prince Philip about his role as the president of the World Wildlife Fund. Foster also presented and made reports for Daytime Live in the 80s, the show which replaced Pebble Mill. She was also a host on the first series of BBC2 car show Top Gear. Later on television she fronted gardening reports for Look North. She worked in Ethiopia filming the results of Live Aid.

On radio she has presented music programmes on BBC Radio 2 and Woman's Hour for BBC Radio 4. She produced the documentary series The Task Of Mankind for BBC Two and also worked for BBC One and BBC Two. Foster also produced Challenge Anneka for Children In Need in 1987. She was also a science reporter for various public broadcasting stations across America. Foster joined BBC Radio Newcastle in 1993 to host programmes such as Colour Supplement on a Saturday morning and Sunday Breakfast. She is currently a presenter on the station, hosting the weekly gardening show Garden Mania on Sunday mornings for over 30 years. She has presented programmes from RHS Chelsea Flower Show and worked alongside Alan Titchmarsh. Her co-presenter includes gardening expert John Guy. Previous co-hosts alongside Foster on the programme included former gardening experts Stan Timmins and Eddie Wardrobe. As of November 2023, the show also broadcasts on BBC Radio Tees. Foster often gives advice and talks at flower shows, events and school across the North East of England.

Foster sung with The Who when they released Tommy, performing the first stage performance alongside the English Chamber Choir at London's Rainbow Theatre.

In 2017, Foster appeared on Peter Seabrook's podcast This Week In The Garden.

In 2025, Foster was interviewed for the Radio Times Face Behind The Voice feature. In September, Foster attended the annual Northumbria In Bloom Awards as a guest, as well as interviewing winners and finalists for her BBC Garden Mania radio programme.

Foster is often a compère and judge for Northumbria In Bloom. Foster is the former President of the North of England Horticultural Society.

== Awards ==
During her time on Pebble Mill at One, Foster had a rose named after her called 'The Marian Foster Rose'. In 2017, Foster won a Garden Media Guild Award for her BBC Radio Newcastle broadcast documentary on English landscape gardener Capability Brown.

In September 2024, Foster was awarded The Chartered Institute of Horticulture's Northern Branch Commendation for 2024, in recognition of her tireless promotion of community horticulture in the North of England. The award was presented by Northern Branch Chairman Clive Parker CHort FCIHort on stage at the Northumbria in Bloom Awards Presentation, held at The Fed, Gateshead on Wednesday 18 September at which Marian was compere.
