= Lyn Spencer =

British broadcaster

Lyn Spencer (born 24 October 1951) is a former British broadcaster, best known for her work at Tyne Tees Television.

== Education ==
Born in Newcastle upon Tyne, she attended the Newcastle College of Further Education and the Canley College of Education in Coventry.

== Career ==
During the early 1970s, Spencer was a youth worker at the Camden Youth Project in North London and an English & drama teacher at Heworth Grange Comprehensive School in Felling, Gateshead.

Then in 1975, at the age of 23, Spencer joined the presentation department at Tyne Tees and became popular with viewers as the duty announcer on Saturday mornings, when on-air links often featured competitions, interviews and birthday greetings. A year later, the continuity links were relaunched into a new Saturday morning children's programme entitled Lyn's Look In, for which Spencer was the presenter, researcher and producer. According to an interview in 2005, the programme was launched when broadcast trade unions insisted that the Saturday continuity links were turning into a programme of their own and should be treated as such.

Lyn's Look In remained on-air until 1979 when Spencer took maternity leave to have her first child. She returned to Tyne Tees later in the year to present Check It Out, a local teenage magazine show, alongside future Top of the Pops producer Chris Cowey. The series, which ran until 1982, is best remembered for an appearance by punk group Public Image Ltd., during which John Lydon walked out.

In 1981, Spencer became co-presenter (alongside Alistair Pirrie) for the networked children's pop programme, Razzmatazz. She presented two series of the show before leaving Tyne Tees to join Metro Radio, although she still occasionally appeared as a continuity announcer in the early to mid 1980s. Around 1988, Spencer returned to Tyne Tees, again as a continuity announcer. During what was her second stint at the station, Spencer presented various regional programmes including The End of the Eighties Show and The Really Useful Guide.

Spencer left Tyne Tees again in 1993 and went into charity work as a fundraiser at Disability North, followed by a job as an advertising executive. Between 1995 and 1997, she presented the Breakfast Show on the now-defunct Great North Radio. During that time, she set up a public relations company.

She now runs White Hot Communications alongside PR specialist Nicky Harrison. She has two children from her first marriage to former Tyne Tees Television presenter Roger Tames. In 1988, she married BBC Radio Newcastle presenter Paddy MacDee, and they have one son.
