= The Late Paddy MacDee Show =

- Other names: Paddy MacDee Sunday Show
- Genre: Music, local features, interviews
- Running time: 3 hours (weeknights), 4 hours (Sundays)
- Country of origin: United Kingdom
- Language: English
- Home station: BBC Radio Newcastle
- Hosted by: Paddy MacDee
- Original release: Early summer 2004 – Late 2018
- Audio format: FM, DAB, online streaming
- Opening theme: Various (curated by presenter)

The Late Paddy MacDee Show replaced Northern Nights on BBC Radio Newcastle in the early summer of 2004. It ran from 10 pm until 1 am every weeknight until late 2018 - playing his own selection of music alongside features and local bands and musicians.

Paddy MacDee presented a show on Sundays between 6 pm and 10 pm, playing hits from the 1960s and 1970s. The show was previously broadcast 5-7pm.
