= Bob Langley =

British television presenter

- Born: 28 August 1939 (age 86); Newcastle upon Tyne
- Occupations: Television presenter (Retired), Author
- Years active: 1970–1999
- Known for: Pebble Mill at One
- Notable work: Falklands Gambit (1988), The Third Pinnacle (1999)

Bob Langley (born 28 August 1939) is a former British television presenter, best known for being a presenter of the BBC1 afternoon chat show Pebble Mill at One. Langley also presented its late night version Saturday Night at The Mill. Langley is also a novelist.

== Career ==
Langley started his career in a Newcastle insurance office, served in the RAF, then travelled through America. He began his broadcast career in the early days of Tyne Tees television on the nightly news programme. "The early days could be a bit catastrophic, a real string and sealing wax job," he said. "There weren't too many of us who really knew what we were doing. We didn't even have an autocue, and when we had it was like a giant toilet roll, but we had an awful lot of fun."

Throughout 1968 he was a newsreader on BBC television news, and from 1970 he was a reporter on Nationwide. It was as a result of his and fellow presenter Donny MacLeod's success on the latter show that they were assigned to launch Pebble Mill in 1972 alongside Marian Foster.

Bob Langley also wrote several novels, including The War of the Running Fox (1978). and a number of non-fiction works including a study of the sinking of the Argentinian light cruiser General Belgrano and a coast-to-coast guide, "Walking the Scottish Border".
