= Simon Logan's Fantastic 80s =

Radio programme

Simon's 80s and 90s is a weekly music programme on BBC Radio Newcastle and BBC Radio Tees in the UK, presented by Simon Logan, dedicated to music from the 1980s and 1990s with requests, a chart countdown and rare tracks seldom played on radio. The show airs locally on FM, DAB, Freeview and BBC Sounds online. As of November 2023, ‘Simon's 80s and 90s’ airs on a Sunday afternoon 2-6pm on BBC Newcastle and Tees. The show was previously known as Simon's Fantastic 80s, featuring only 80s tracks.

== History ==
The show launched in 2021 on the radio station. The presenter of the show, Simon Logan, has presented various programmes on BBC Radio Newcastle since 2009. He has previously presented shows for Viking FM and Radio Aire, including the breakfast show Logie in the Morning. In addition to Fantastic 80s, Logan presented Ultimate 90s for BBC Radio Newcastle. As of November 2023, ‘Simon's 80s and 90s’ airs on a Saturday afternoon 2-6pm on BBC Newcastle and Tees.

== Achievements ==
Logan's CD of wind-ups from his radio career reached the Official Charts, reaching number 18 in November 1998.
