= 105-106 Capital =

105-106 Capital is the branding given to two Global Radio owned independent radio stations in the United Kingdom:

- Capital North East based in Wallsend, North East England
- Capital Scotland based in Glasgow, Scotland
