= Anne Leuchars =

Broadcaster and journalist

- Born: 2 August 1953 (age 72); Kampala, Uganda
- Occupations: Former news reader, journalist and broadcaster

Anne Leuchars (born 2 August 1953) is an English former broadcaster, journalist and news reader who has worked for the BBC and ITN. A graduate of the University of Liverpool, she began her journalistic career at the Coventry Evening Telegraph and Bristol Evening Post newspapers. Leuchars then worked on regional television news/magazine programmes and then spent ten years at ITN as a newsreader and reporter. She went on to work at Northumberland National Park in Hexham as its information officer.

== Early life ==
Leuchars was born in Kampala, Uganda on 2 August 1953. She is the daughter of a tropical forester who was working for the Forestry Commission in Uganda at the time of her birth. Leuchars was brought up in Uganda until she and her family moved to England when she was nine. She was educated at Farnham Girls' Grammar School and graduated from the University of Liverpool with a Bachelor of Arts honours degree in geography.

== Career ==
Following university, she worked at the Coventry Evening Telegraph newspaper as a member of the reporting staff for four years, and later at the Bristol Evening Post newspaper as a reporter and specialist in theatre drama criticism from July 1978 until 1979. Leuchars reported on events such as terrorist bombings in Coventry, the 1980 St Pauls riot in Bristol and at an army camp on Salisbury Plain.

She went on to work in television, firstly on the regional news/magazine programme BBC Points West for BBC Bristol for 11 months, after she was interviewed by a BBC film reporter about women on picket lines during a Bristol Evening Post provincial newspaper strike in 1978 and she was offered employment in the corporation by a producer. Leuchars was at HTV West on its programmes Report West and Report Extra in Bristol for 12 months. She went on to work as a presenter-reporter for Border Television on its news/magazine programme Lookaround in Carlisle from 1 December 1980. Leuchars also worked at Central Television in Nottingham because she wanted an area that produced more news and was the presenter of Mary Chipperfield and Friends.

She also spent 10 years in London with ITN as a newsreader and reporter from June 1983. Leuchars read her first news bulletin for ITN in August 1983 as her colleague Norman Rees was on assignment abroad, and the last bulletin she read was broadcast on 11 October 1992. She covered royal events such as the visit of Princess Anne to The Gambia and Upper Volta in 1984, the 1986 wedding of Prince Andrew and Sarah Ferguson from the village of Dummer, Hampshire, and the four-day visit of the Prince and Princess of Wales to Hungary in 1990. Leuchars also reported on the 1984 United States presidential election, The Troubles, the Hungerford massacre, Pan Am Flight 103, bombing raids in Africa and on the Contras in Nicaragua.

Leuchars went freelance and began a two-year part-time conservation course at the University of Oxford. She was on programmes such as co-presenting Pieces of Parkin alongside former newsreader Leonard Parkin, the six-part series Big Business on Yorkshire Television, the Anglia Television countryside programme Countrywide, and the eight-week Granada Television environmental series The Big Green Boat Show during the 1990s. Becoming interested in the environment, she then spent five years as information officer with Northumberland National Park in Hexham from November 1992, promoting the park and liaising with bodies such as the Forestry Commission and the English Tourist Board. Leuchars rejoined the BBC with its BBC North East and Cumbria team in Newcastle. Leuchars returned to television, stepping in for Carol Malia on BBC Look North for three months in late 1998. She presented the afternoon news programme alongside Jon Harle on BBC Radio Newcastle until 2016. In 2015, Leuchars released a walking book on hiking with her friend Debby Waldron called You Take the High Road; Northumbrian Walks.
