= Paddy MacDee =

British radio presenter

- Born: Patrick McDermott; 17 May 1950; Dublin, Ireland
- Spouse: Lyn Spencer
- Presenting career
- Show: ITV Tyne Tees, BBC Look North
- Stations: Previously BBC Tees, BBC Radio Cleveland
- Station: BBC Radio Newcastle (until 2020)
- Style: Television and radio presenter
- Country: United Kingdom

Paddy MacDee is a former television presenter, newsreader, radio presenter and compere from North East England. He is best known for his work on ITV Tyne Tees, BBC Look North (North East and Cumbria) and BBC Radio Newcastle.

== Life and career ==
MacDee started out working in a law firm as an articled clark, while having his own mobile disco on the side. In the end, he decided to stop working in law and focus on his popular discos. This then led Paddy to working in radio.

In 1973, Paddy presented his first radio show, on BBC Radio Cleveland, his first ever interviewee was Paul McCartney, who was playing in Newcastle Upon Tyne.

MacDee worked full-time for the BBC until 1977, before spending eight years at Metro Radio. He returned to the BBC in the 1980s.

He is best known for presenting programmes for BBC Radio Cleveland, BBC Radio Tees and BBC Radio Newcastle including The Late Paddy MacDee Show and Solid Gold Sunday for over 40 years until 2020.

MacDee was previously a news reader for ITV Tyne Tees and BBC Look North (North East and Cumbria) for many years.

MacDee is married to former television presenter Lyn Spencer in which they have one son together.
