= Sue Sweeney =

Comedian and radio presenter

- Born: Susan Sweeney; 22 September; County Durham, England
- Spouse: Ian Sweeney
- Children: 2; Jade and Rachel Sweeney
- Presenting career
- Station: BBC Radio Newcastle (until 2019)
- Station: Durham On Air (2020–present)
- Style: Comedienne & Presenter
- Country: United Kingdom

Sue Sweeney (born 22 September) is an English comedienne, radio presenter, actress and singer. She is best known for her work on BBC Radio and Durham On Air.

== Life ==
Sweeney is best known in the North East of England. She was trained as a singer from a young age and toured around the UK in various tribute bands and stand-up comedy shows. She has two daughters, Jade and Journalist Rachel Sweeney. She is married to Ian Sweeney. Alongside her performing career, Sweeney is most famous for presenting on BBC Radio Newcastle presenting various shows for over 20 years until 2019.

Alongside presenting music programmes on BBC Radio Newcastle and BBC Radio Tees, Sweeney is now a presenter on Durham On Air, hosting the evening show on Monday and Wednesday. On television, Sweeney has appeared in 'A Song For Marion', 'Byker Grove', and 'Unfinished Song'.

Sweeney is a comedienne who won The North East Comedy Award in 1998, the first woman to do so. She released two comedy DVDs: She's a Tonic in 2009 and The Diva of Durham in 2011.

In 2016, she took part in a special event in which she unveiled the tomosynthesis machine at Queen Elizabeth Hospital in Gateshead.

She was previously a patron for charity FACT (Fighting All Cancers Together). In 2022, she joined St Cuthberts Hospice as part of their Win Win Lottery.

In 2021, Sweeney was awarded the Rotary International Foundation medal for better understanding and friendly relations among people of the world.

In 2022, she was announced as one of Durham City AFC's 'Celebrity Citizens', helping the club to re-connect with the Durham community. She is also an Ambassador for the Arts in the North East of England.

In November 2022, she hosted Durham's Christmas light switch on with Joe McElderry.

In February 2025, Sweeney revealed that she was delighted that her daughter, Rachel Sweeney, was following in her footsteps after joining BBC Radio Newcastle as a news reader.

In August 2025, Sweeney was featured in the Radio Times as part of their 'Face behind the voice' segment.
