= Railton Howes =

British radio presenter

- Born: Railton Howes; 17 April 1949 (age 77); Newcastle Upon Tyne, England
- Presenting career
- Station: BBC Radio Newcastle
- Style: Television and radio presenter
- Country: United Kingdom

Railton Howes is a radio presenter and producer from North East England. He is best known for his work on BBC Radio Newcastle, presenting weekly fishing programme 'Howes Fishing'.

== Life and career ==
Howes joined BBC Radio Newcastle in 1973, presenting various programmes on the radio station. He presented the weekly fishing programme called 'Howes Fishing', which looked at the rivers and reservoirs in the North East England. The show was also available widely as a podcast.

In addition to presenting, Howes is also a studio technician, often producing sport programmes for the station.

Howes is currently the longest-serving staff member at BBC Radio Newcastle.

Railton cites his happiest memory as the birth of his daughter Rebecca in 1991.
