= Durham On Air =

English radio station

Durham; United Kingdom
- Broadcast area: Tynemouth & South Shields • Newcastle and Gateshead • South Durham
- Frequency: DAB: 8A (N&G); 9B (T&SS, SD)
- RDS: DURHAM ON AIR

Programming
- Language: English
- Format: Freeform

Ownership
- Owner: Grim Up North LTD

History
- First air date: 5 November 2020

Links
- Website: www.durhamonair.com

Durham On Air (often styled as Durham OnAir) is a local radio station serving the people of Durham, in the North East of England.

== History ==
Durham On Air launched on 5 November 2020. The station broadcasts on DAB, online and via Freeview.

Former BBC presenter Sue Sweeney presents the evening show on a Monday and Wednesday evening on the station.

Durham On Air broadcasts Spennymoor Town FC games.

== Notable presenters ==
- Sue Sweeney
- Chris Kirk
- Chris Coxon
