= Colin Bunyan =

English radio broadcaster

- Presenting career
- Show: Vintage Vinyl
- Station: BBC Radio Tees (since 1976)
- Time slot: Sundays 4-6pm
- Station: Previously BBC Radio Cleveland
- Style: Radio presenter
- Country: United Kingdom

Colin Bunyan is an English radio broadcaster, best known for his weekly Vintage Vinyl programmes on BBC Radio Tees.

== Career ==
Bunyan, born and raised in Middlesbrough, joined BBC Radio Cleveland in 1974 and has presented various different programmes for the station including breakfast, drive-time, evening and his current and popular BBC Radio Tees Vintage Vinyl programme on Sunday afternoons.

Bunyan is currently the longest serving presenter on BBC Radio Tees.

In 2014, Bunyan celebrated his 40th year in radio broadcasting, in which one of his highlights included interviewing famous faces such as Cliff Richard, Craig Douglas and Connie Francis. In 2023, Bunyan's Vintage Vinyl programme came to an end as part of wider changes within BBC Local Radio.

Bunyan is married to hairdresser Allan Iveson, they live in Middlesbrough. Bunyan supported Iveson after a takeaway restaurant was launched right next to Iveson's salon forcing it to close.

Bunyan has previously worked as a site engineer at Middlesbrough College.
