= Pebble Mill at One =

British television series (1972–1996)

- Opening titles
- Also known as: Pebble Mill (1991–1996)
- Presented by: Marian Foster, Bob Langley, David Seymour, Donny MacLeod, Judi Spiers
- Country of origin: United Kingdom
- Original language: English

Production
- Running time: 45 minutes

Original release
- Network: BBC1
- Release: 2 October 1972 – 29 March 1996

Pebble Mill at One is a British television magazine programme that was broadcast live on weekdays at one o'clock on BBC1, from 2 October 1972 to 23 May 1986, and again from 14 October 1991 to 29 March 1996. It was transmitted from the Pebble Mill studios of BBC Birmingham, and uniquely was hosted from the centre's main foyer area, rather than a conventional television studio.

== Broadcast ==
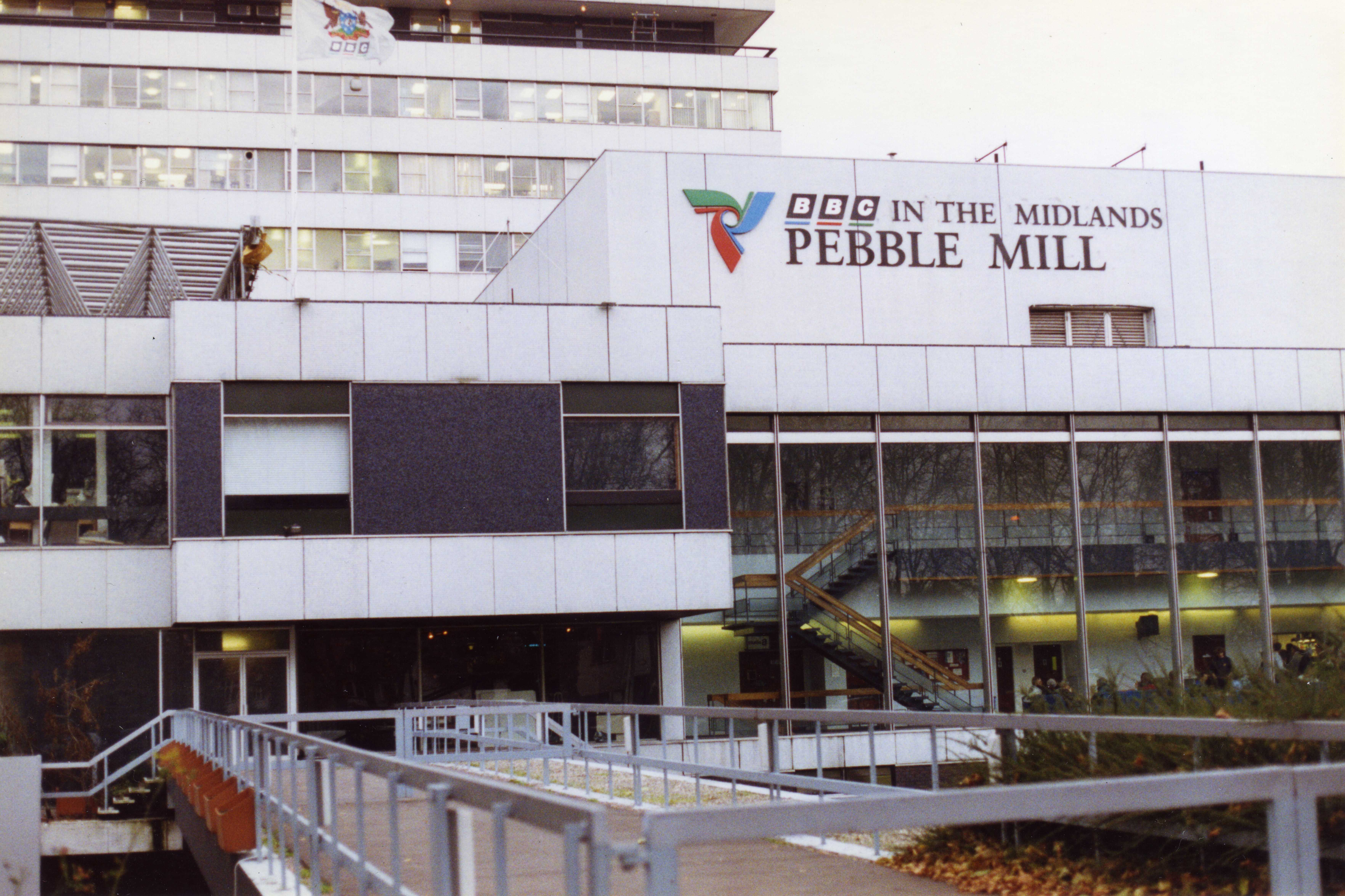
BBC Pebble Mill Studios in Birmingham (1992)

Until 1972, broadcasting hours on British television were tightly controlled and limited by the British government. There were restrictions on the number of hours per day which could be used by the BBC and ITV for regular television programming. In the 1960s, it was set at a 50-hour allowance per week (with exemptions for schools programmes, adult education, state occasions, Welsh language programming, and outside broadcasts of sporting events) and gradually increased by the government at regular intervals. In 1972, the government – under Conservative Prime Minister Edward Heath – announced its plan to completely lift all restrictions and limits on broadcasting hours, and allow the BBC and ITV to set their own schedules. This was introduced in January of that year.

With the lifting of the broadcasting restrictions, ITV planned to launch a full daytime schedule in the autumn of 1972, with the broadcasting day gradually increasing throughout that year. To counter this, the BBC planned to launch a selection of new programming along with repeats and films, to expand their daytime schedules; developing a lunchtime magazine series to anchor the new BBC1 daytime schedules, which became Pebble Mill at One. At the time of its launch, it was preceded by a five-minute news summary at 12:55 pm, which would lead into the programme commencing at 1:00 pm.

The programme was broadcast from the foyer of Pebble Mill, because a planned third studio was never constructed on the site, and existing facilities were fully booked for network drama production and local news. In the beginning, visitors to the studios were seen arriving in the background as the programme was transmitted. Gradually, as the programme became more successful, the foyer became a studio, and visitors had to use a new entrance. Two weeks after Pebble Mill at One began, ITV launched a brand new daytime line-up, including an ITN News bulletin at lunchtime, placing it in direct competition with Pebble Mill at One. Only a few editions of Pebble Mill at One are known to survive. One that does survive from the early years celebrated the tenth anniversary of Doctor Who in 1973, featuring interviews with Patrick Troughton and visual effects designer Bernard Wilkie; this is included among the special features of the DVD release of The Three Doctors. Some other Doctor Who-related interviews from Pebble Mill at One have also survived due to early domestic video recordings and have been released on DVDs.

On 20 September 1979, Pebble Mill at One was visited by a Sea Harrier aircraft from RNAS Yeovilton (aircraft FRS.1 XZ451 of 700A Squadron) flown by Lieutenant Commander Nigel "Sharkey" Ward, which landed (and later took off) vertically, on the adjacent BBC Social Club's football pitch. The programme returned the favour on 7 April 1986 by transmitting a live programme from the newly launched aircraft carrier HMS Ark Royal in the English Channel. This programme, which was produced by Tom Ross and directed by Tony Rayner, got the show's highest ever audience of nearly six million viewers.

Until 1986, there were few television programmes transmitted on BBC television during daytime hours. For this reason, Pebble Mill at One acquired a unique following from those who found themselves at home at lunchtime. Housewives, students, and those recovering from an illness remember it with fondness for its variety and the problems inherent with live television. One of the more frequently repeated scenes from Pebble Mill at One was in 1986, when Marian Foster introduced pop singer Owen Paul, who was to perform his hit cover of Marshall Crenshaw's "My Favourite Waste of Time". He was expected to mime to a backing track, but as he could not hear the foldback loudspeaker as it had failed, Paul was left standing looking into the camera, while viewers heard him singing to the music.

The main presenters during the show's run included Marian Foster, Donny MacLeod, Bob Langley, Judi Spiers, Jan Leeming and Paul Coia.

Later presenters included Fern Britton, Gloria Hunniford, Debi Jones, Tom Coyne, Marjorie Lofthouse, David Seymour, Magnus Magnusson, Alan Titchmarsh, Chris Baines and Josephine Buchan. Editors included Terry Dobson, Jim Dumighan, and Peter Hercombe. A regular cookery slot was presented by Rev John Eley, popularly known as the Cooking Canon.

The programme's signature tune was initially "As You Please", written by easy listening composer Raymond Lefèvre. It was later changed to "Miller's Tune" by Patchwork.

=== End ===
In 1986, Bill Cotton, managing director of television at the BBC, decided that a full daytime service was required on BBC1. As part of this new service, the decision was taken by BBC1 controller Michael Grade to replace Pebble Mill at One with a new lunchtime news bulletin, the One O'Clock News. More than 30,000 viewers wrote to the BBC to complain. A previous Assistant Editor of the programme, Roger Laughton (later to become a senior executive with the BBC and Meridian Broadcasting), was given responsibility for planning the BBC's new daytime schedule but the format did not reappear until the following year, returning on 21 October 1987 as Daytime Live. It was renamed as Scene Today in October 1990 and finally Pebble Mill in October 1991. None of these programmes was broadcast at 1:00 pm – they were aired in the hour preceding the One O'Clock News.

== Spin-offs ==
There were several Pebble Mill spin-offs, particularly in the 1970s, such as the late night chat show Saturday Night at the Mill which began in 1976. Kenny Ball and His Jazzmen were the regular house band, and they performed the signature tune. Until 1978, the spin-off was hosted by Bob Langley and Donny MacLeod, who was replaced by Tony Lewis, and who in turn was replaced in 1980 by Arianna Stassinopoulos, though she was dropped after just five editions. For the remainder of the season, Langley was joined by a different female co-host each week, which included Hayley Mills, Sue Cook, Liza Goddard, Maureen Lipman, Jill Townsend, Jackie Collins and Jenny Hanley, who became the permanent co-host to Langley for the final season broadcast in 1981.

In its final year, an early evening version called Six Fifty-Five Special surfaced when Pebble Mill was on its summer break, presented by Sally James, Paul Coia, David Soul and Bob Langley. In 1986, The Clothes Show, presented by Jeff Banks and Selina Scott, was created from a strand produced by Roger Casstles, first shown on Pebble Mill at One.
