= Bilsdale transmitting station =

Telecommunications transmission site in North Yorkshire, England

Bilsdale
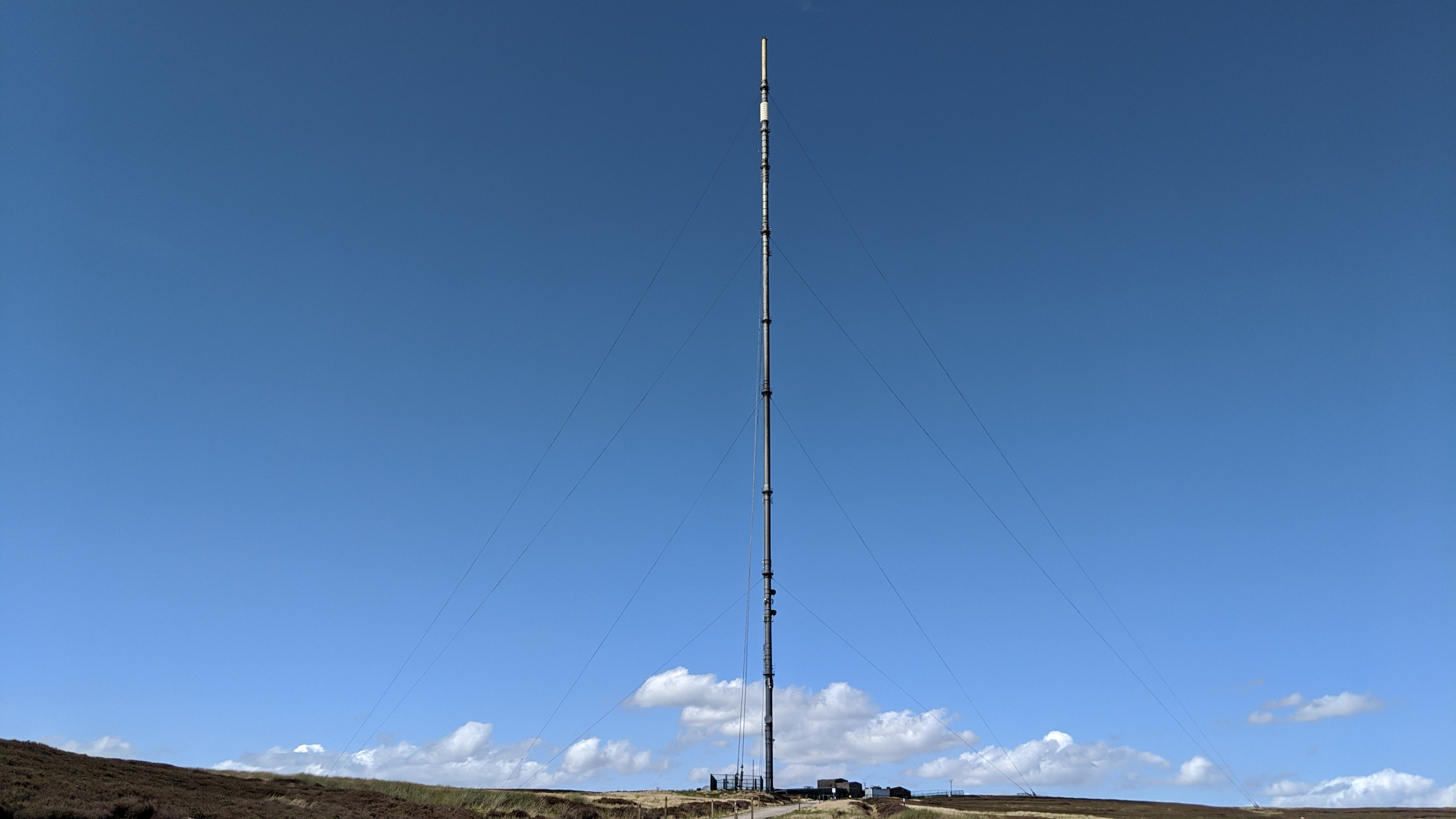
- The original (1969) Bilsdale mast stood high above the hills of the North York Moors.

- Location within North Yorkshire
- Mast height: 306 metres (1,004 ft)
- Coordinates: 54.358611°N 1.150278°W
- Grid reference: SE553962
- Built: 1969
- BBC region: BBC North East and Cumbria
- ITV region: ITV Tyne Tees
- Local TV service: Local TV Teesside

The Bilsdale transmitting station is a broadcasting and telecommunications facility, located at Bilsdale West Moor above Bilsdale, close to Helmsley, North Yorkshire, England. The original facility included a guyed steel tubular mast that was primarily used for radio and television transmission. The height of the mast was 314 metres (1,030 ft) to the pinnacle. Until a fire disabled the transmitter on 10 August 2021 it was among the most powerful transmitters in the UK. The power for analogue was 500 kW ERP and it was 100 kW / 50 kW for digital. The mast was equipped with aircraft warning lights, in the form of arrays of red LEDs. The station was owned and operated by Arqiva. After the main mast was disabled a temporary 80 metres (260 ft) mast was installed at the site. The temporary mast commenced operations on 13 October 2021.

== History ==
=== Original mast (1969–2021) ===
Bilsdale was constructed by J. L. Eve Construction for the BBC in 1969 to bring 625-line colour television on UHF to Teesside and the surrounding areas for the first time. Having added UHF TV to the existing VHF TV stations at Pontop Pike and Emley Moor, it was quickly established that a new station would be required to cover County Durham and north North Yorkshire where existing coverage was poor, and thus the new station was built.

Colour broadcasts on BBC1 started on Saturday 31 October 1970.

==== Fire and demolition ====
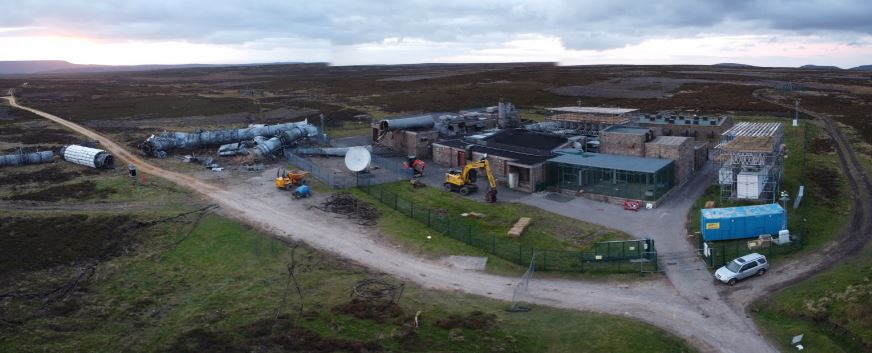
Bilsdale Transmitting Station on 10 October 2021, with sections of the demolished mast visible at left on both sides of the track

On 10 August 2021, a fire started at the complex which included the mast. At 13:19 an engineer working at the transmitter called the North Yorkshire Fire and Rescue Service stating that he believed the mast was on fire and could see smoke coming from below the first stay level 50–60 metres (160–200 ft) from the ground. It was reported that up to one million homes had lost TV and radio signals. Concerns remained about the structural integrity of the mast, which now needed to have a structural engineering assessment. Arqiva confirmed that they were working on restoring service using a combination of temporary structures and existing infrastructure around the region, but were unable to provide a timescale for this. Viewers in the Hartlepool and Redcar and the eastern edges of Middlesbrough were able to receive their television services from the Eston Nab transmitting station. The frequencies of the Eston Nab relay were altered to match the frequencies of the out-of-service Bilsdale frequencies for the PSB services, and COM TV services are provided by a temporary mast to the same area, using Eston Nab’s frequencies. On 19 August, transmitter operator Arqiva announced that an increase in power would enable 250,000 households in the area to receive a signal from the Eston Nab transmitter. Viewers in most parts of North Yorkshire were able to switch to a different transmitter which broadcast news and television programmes from another region, and areas such as York, Harrogate, Thirsk, Pickering, Malton and some parts of Ripon who received the Bilsdale transmitter were able to receive the Emley Moor transmitter situated near Huddersfield in West Yorkshire. On 6 October 2021, Arqiva carried out a controlled demolition of the old mast, as the structure was found to be irreparably damaged. Sections of the mast have been retained for investigation purposes.

=== Temporary mast (2021– 2023) ===
Following the destruction of the first mast, Arqiva constructed a temporary mast in a nearby former quarry site. The mast is 80 metres (260 ft) high and commenced operation on 13 October 2021.

=== Replacement ===
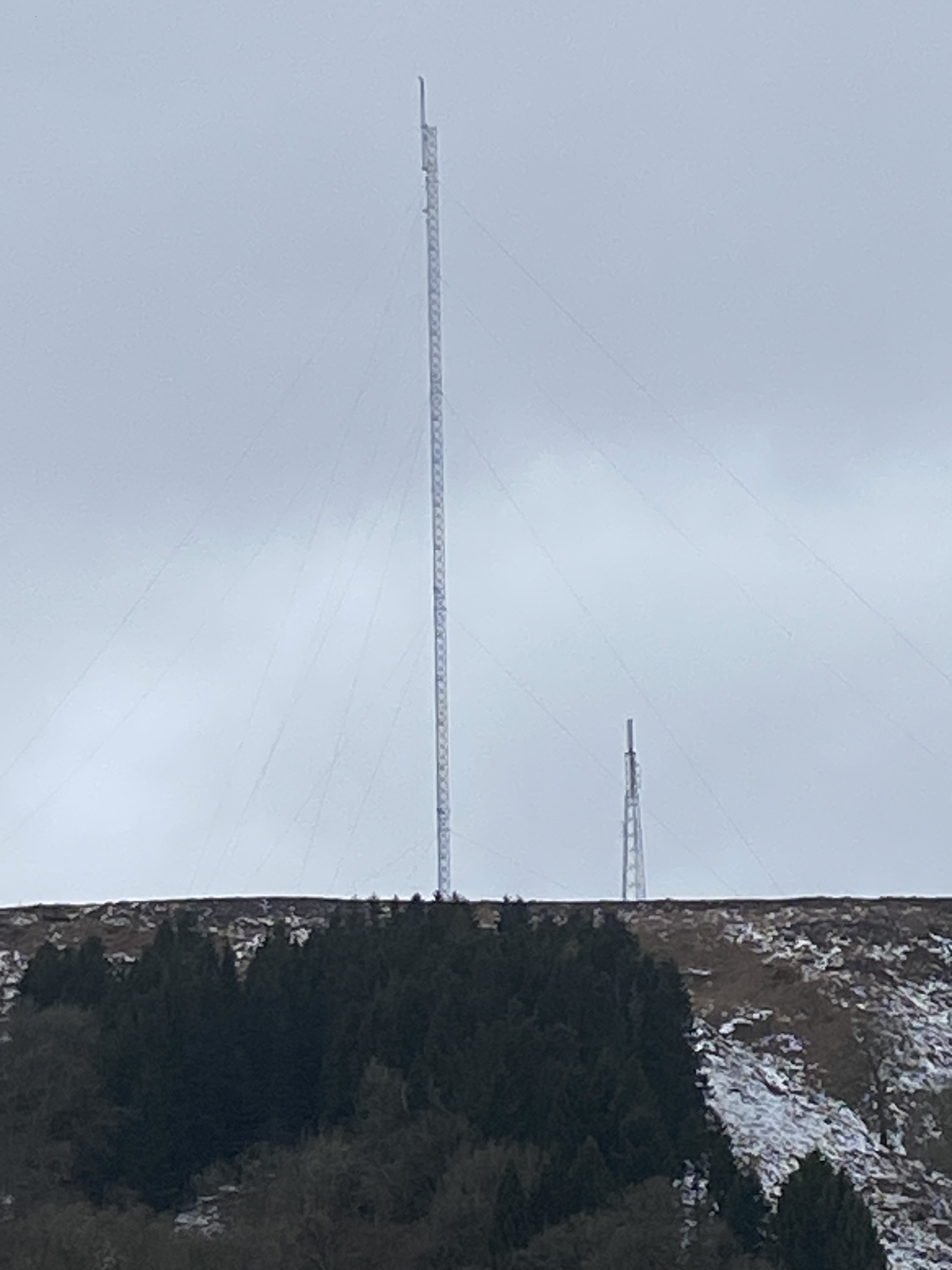
New telecommunications mast at Bilsdale, North Yorkshire. March 2023

A new mast of similar height and capability to the old one has been built on the site. The new mast is a guyed lattice type with total structure height of 294.6 metres (967 ft). The top mounted UHF DTV antenna giving a total height of 306.2 metres (1,005 ft). The replacement mast was completed in February 2023. Transmission equipment for the new mast was switched on in the early hours of Monday 22 May 2023, thereby fully restoring Standard Definition TV signals. HDTV signals, Radio and mobile services are still on the temporary mast, thus not reaching as far.

== Coverage ==
Coverage extends throughout Teesside and the surrounding regions, encompassing north North Yorkshire and southern County Durham. This included Harrogate and York to the south, Filey and Whitby to the east, Middlesbrough, Stockton, Darlington, Bishop Auckland, Hartlepool, Peterlee, some areas of Seaham and some areas of Sunderland to the north, and Barnard Castle and Worton to the west as main reception areas. TV coverage extends, particularly at the coast, up to Alnwick, Northumberland in the north and is useful for areas where the main signal from Pontop Pike is shaded.

== Channels listed by frequency ==
=== Analogue radio ===
Frequency	kW	Service
89.0 MHz	5	BBC Radio 2
91.2 MHz	5	BBC Radio 3
93.4 MHz	5	BBC Radio 4
95.0 MHz	10	BBC Radio Tees
96.6 MHz	8.9	Hits Radio Teesside
98.6 MHz	5	BBC Radio 1
100.7 MHz	8.9	Heart North East
101.6 MHz	1	Classic FM
106.4 MHz	8.9	Capital North East
107.7 MHz	0.4	Smooth North East (not receivable in York)

=== Digital radio ===
Frequency	Block	kW	Operator
213.360 MHz	10C	10	MuxCo North Yorkshire
216.928 MHz	11A	5	SDL National
218.640 MHz	11B	3	Teesside
222.064 MHz	11D	4.7	Digital One
225.648 MHz	12B	2	BBC National DAB

=== Digital television ===
In July 2007, it was confirmed by Ofcom that the television frequency assignment after digital switchover would be such that a wideband or group K aerial would be required for reception of all six multiplexes. However, the three public service multiplexes would still fall within the station's original analogue frequency range assignment of aerial group A. The digital switchover started at Bilsdale on 12 September 2012 and was one of the last transmitters in England to complete this operation on 26 September 2012, the others being Pontop Pike and Chatton in the same region.

On 13 November 2019, due to the 700 MHz Clearance Programme, the following multiplexes moved frequencies:

- BBC A from UHF 26 to UHF 21.
- Digital 3&4 from UHF 29 to UHF 24.
- BBC B from UHF 23 to UHF 27.
- Arqiva C and D moving to UHF 55 and UHF 56 respectively.

On 12 March, BBC A and BBC B swap UHF Channel allocations, with BBC A on UHF 27 and BBC B on UHF 21.

On 25 June 2020, COM 8 was switched off permanently due to the effects of the 700 MHz clearance programme.

All broadcasting from Bilsdale temporarily ceased on 10 August 2021 due to damage to the mast by fire.

Frequency	UHF	kW	Operator	System
474.000 MHz	21	100	BBC B	DVB-T2
498.000 MHz	24	100	Digital 3&4	DVB-T
522.000 MHz	27	100	BBC A	DVB-T
626.000 MHz	40	50	Arqiva B	DVB-T
650.000 MHz	43	50	SDN	DVB-T
674.000 MHz	46	50	Arqiva A	DVB-T
746.000 MHz	55	26.9	Arqiva C	DVB-T2

==== Before switchover ====
the low power transmissions ceased on 26 September 2012. mux 1 was switched off on 12 September 2012

Frequency	UHF	kW	Operator
474.000 MHz	21	6	Digital 3&4 (Mux 2)
498.000 MHz	24	6	BBC (Mux B)
522.000 MHz	27	6	Arqiva (Mux C)
554.000 MHz	31	6	SDN (Mux A)
578.000 MHz	34	4.8	BBC (Mux 1)
642.000 MHz	42	1.6	Arqiva (Mux D)

=== Analogue television ===
Analogue television is no longer available from Bilsdale; BBC2 was closed on 12 September 2012, followed by the remaining four channels on 26 September 2012.

Frequency	UHF	kW	Service
487.25 MHz	23	500	Channel 4
511.25 MHz	26	500	BBC2 North East
535.25 MHz	29	500	Tyne Tees
567.25 MHz	33	500	BBC1 North East
583.25 MHz	35	500	Channel 5

== Relays ==
Below is a list of transmitters that relayed Bilsdale.

=== Digital television ===
transmitter	kW	BBC-A	BBC-B	D3&4	SDN	ARQ-A	ARQ-B	Pol.
Aislaby	0.0076	45	42	39	—N/a	—N/a	—N/a	BV
Bainbridge	0.0076	57	53	60	—N/a	—N/a	—N/a	CDV
Castleton	0.002	50	55	59	—N/a	—N/a	—N/a	CDV
Eston Nab	0.003	52	48	51	—N/a	—N/a	—N/a	BV
Grinton Lodge	0.005	45	49	42	—N/a	—N/a	—N/a	BV
Guisborough	0.01	57	53	60	—N/a	—N/a	—N/a	CDV
Limber Hill	0.008	47	44	41	—N/a	—N/a	—N/a	BV
Peterlee	0.002	45	39	42	—N/a	—N/a	—N/a	BV
Ravenscar	0.033	56	53	58	—N/a	—N/a	—N/a	CDV
Romaldkirk	0.012	44	47	41	—N/a	—N/a	—N/a	BV
Rookhope	0.002	45	49	42	—N/a	—N/a	—N/a	BV
Rosedale Abbey	0.002	45	42	39	—N/a	—N/a	—N/a	BV
Skinningrove	0.006	52	48	51	—N/a	—N/a	—N/a	BV
West Burton	0.002	45	42	39	—N/a	—N/a	—N/a	BV
Whitby	0.1	55	50	59	—N/a	—N/a	—N/a	CDV

== See also ==
- List of masts
- List of tallest buildings and structures in Great Britain
- List of radio stations in the United Kingdom
