= Donny MacLeod =

Former television presenter

- Donny MacLeod on the roof of the Pebble Mill Studio, Birmingham, UK, 1980.
- Born: Donald B. MacLeod; 1 July 1932; Stornoway, Isle of Lewis, Scotland
- Died: 6 September 1984 (aged 52)
- Occupation: Television presenter

Donald B. MacLeod (1 July 1932 – 6 September 1984), popularly known as Donny MacLeod and Donny Bee, was a Scottish TV presenter. MacLeod is best known for appearing on the BBC1 afternoon show Pebble Mill at One.

== Early life and career ==
MacLeod was born in Stornoway, Isle of Lewis. After National Service in the Royal Navy, he studied in Glasgow and then at Gray's School of Art in Aberdeen, before returning to teach art at the Nicolson Institute in Stornoway.

He stood for election to the UK Parliament at the 1959 United Kingdom general election for his home constituency of The Western Isles as a Liberal Party candidate, in a campaign described as "one of the most charismatic in Island memory". The local Conservative Party did not contest the election and were happy to recommend him to their supporters. However, he was defeated by the Labour candidate. At the 1964 United Kingdom general election he again contested The Western Isles for the Liberal Party, but this time, the Conservatives decided to run their own candidate. He finished second, again behind the Labour candidate.

After occasional print journalism pieces MacLeod joined Grampian Television in Aberdeen as a reporter, before moving to the BBC and in 1970 joining the presenting team of its early evening magazine programme Nationwide, where features he fronted included a dieting item, Slim '72. As a result of their success on the programme, he and another Nationwide reporter Bob Langley transferred to Birmingham in 1972 to launch a new lunchtime features programme Pebble Mill at One, which became an immediate success. MacLeod remained a key presenter on the show alongside Langley and Marian Foster (as well as a weekend evening show called "Saturday Night at the Mill") from its beginning in 1972 until his death.

MacLeod was also known for his role as the presenter of the 1982 and 1983 World's Strongest Man competitions as well as several acclaimed travel documentaries including "MacLeod's America", "MacLeod's Russia" (where MacLeod and his crew were given previously-unknown access behind the Iron Curtain), "MacLeod's Japan", and "Macleod's Singapore". He also presented a number of programmes for BBC Radio 4 and BBC Scotland, including Reporting Scotland and a number of food items for The Food Programme.

== Death ==
MacLeod died from a heart attack in 1984, aged 52, after a short struggle with bowel cancer.
