= Alistair Pirrie =

Alistair Pirrie (1954 or 1955 – 27 January 2017) was a British television and radio presenter, producer and director, well known in the North East England for radio and local TV work, primarily on Radio Tees. He attended Grangefield School, Stockton on Tees.

His first break into the music scene came as a young journalist for the New Musical Express (NME) in the early 70s, including a seminal interview with Leonard Cohen in March 1973 at a point when Cohen was debating leaving the industry. However, he is best known nationally in the UK for presenting the ITV Tyne Tees children's television pop music programme Razzmatazz between 1981 and 1987. The show also provided Lisa Stansfield with an early presenting role. He also acted as a producer for ITV's ill-fated Top of the Pops competitor, The Roxy

He subsequently moved to London, leaving mainstream broadcasting to focus on social work and community projects such as video and radio workshops at The Community Zone in South London, as well as working on rehabilitation projects for prisoners with The Clink Institute (now The Clink Charity). He was also a member of the Arts Centre Group, a group to encourage Christians in the arts, media and entertainment.

He also produced and directed video material for the comedians Jimmy Jones and Roy Chubby Brown.

He was married to Noi, and had three children: Tamasin, Dominique, and Atticus. He died, at age 62, following a major stroke, in Streatham, South London, where he had lived for the previous two decades.
