= BBC North East and Cumbria =

English region of the British broadcaster

- BBC North East and Cumbria's area (red) within the UK
- TV stations: BBC One
- TV transmitters: Bilsdale; Caldbeck; Chatton; Pontop Pike
- Radio stations: BBC Radio Newcastle; BBC Radio Cumbria; BBC Radio Tees
- Headquarters: Broadcasting House, Barrack Rd, Newcastle upon Tyne NE2 4NS
- Area: Newcastle upon Tyne; Gateshead; South Tyneside; North Tyneside; City of Sunderland; County Durham; Northumberland; North Yorkshire (parts); Cumbria (except Barrow-in-Furness and South Lakeland)
- Regions: North East and parts of Yorkshire and North West
- Key people: Phil Roberts (Head of Regional & Local Programmes)
- Launch date: 5 January 1959; 67 years ago

BBC North East and Cumbria is one of the BBC's English regions covering Newcastle upon Tyne, North Tyneside, Gateshead, South Tyneside, City of Sunderland, County Durham, Northumberland, north and mid Cumbria and parts of North Yorkshire. The region provides unique BBC One programming, including regional news programmes, and local radio stations. It is headquartered at Broadcasting Centre, Spital Tongues, Newcastle upon Tyne.

== Services ==
=== Television ===
BBC North East & Cumbria's television output, headquartered in Newcastle, is broadcast on BBC One, and consists of the flagship regional news service Look North and Politics North.

=== Radio ===
The region is the controlling centre for three local radio stations - BBC Radio Newcastle, BBC Radio Tees and BBC Radio Cumbria. The three stations simulcast some programmes, as well as the overnight programmes offered by BBC Radio 5 Live.

=== Online and Interactive ===
BBC North East & Cumbria also produces regional news and local radio pages for BBC Red Button and BBC Local News websites for each county.

== History ==
BBC North East & Cumbria began television broadcasting on Monday 5 January 1959, following the separation of the region from the Manchester-based BBC North. Up until that point, the Manchester-based operation had been serving the entire North of England with nightly news bulletins. The new service from Newcastle introduced localised bulletins, read originally by George House and Tom Kilgour. By 1962, the bulletins became a 20-minute magazine programme called Home at Six, presented by Frank Bough.

The arrival of former Tyne Tees Television presenter Mike Neville coincided with a relaunch as Look North in 1964. In 1986, transmissions from the Caldbeck transmitter, to the majority of Cumbria, were transferred from BBC North East to BBC North West, as it was believed the area would be served better from Manchester. However, following complaints from local viewers, the transmitter was transferred back to BBC North East in 1990.

In 1990, BBC North, BBC North West and BBC North East were merged to form one large region, named BBC North. As a result, all managerial and administrative posts from the three regions were merged to form one, allowing cost savings to the corporation. As part of this, each region's programming remained the same; however the region identified itself on-screen as BBC North with all its programmes being BBC North productions. This remained until 1996, when the regions were separated.

The region was renamed BBC North East & Cumbria in 1997, coinciding with the adoption of the new BBC logo and the new BBC One ident package. The on-screen name was adapted slightly to BBC NE & Cumbria in 2002, following the adoption of the Dancer idents for BBC One, as the regional name needed to fit inside the box logo. On the next batch of new "circle" idents the full North East and Cumbria name was used.

== Studios ==
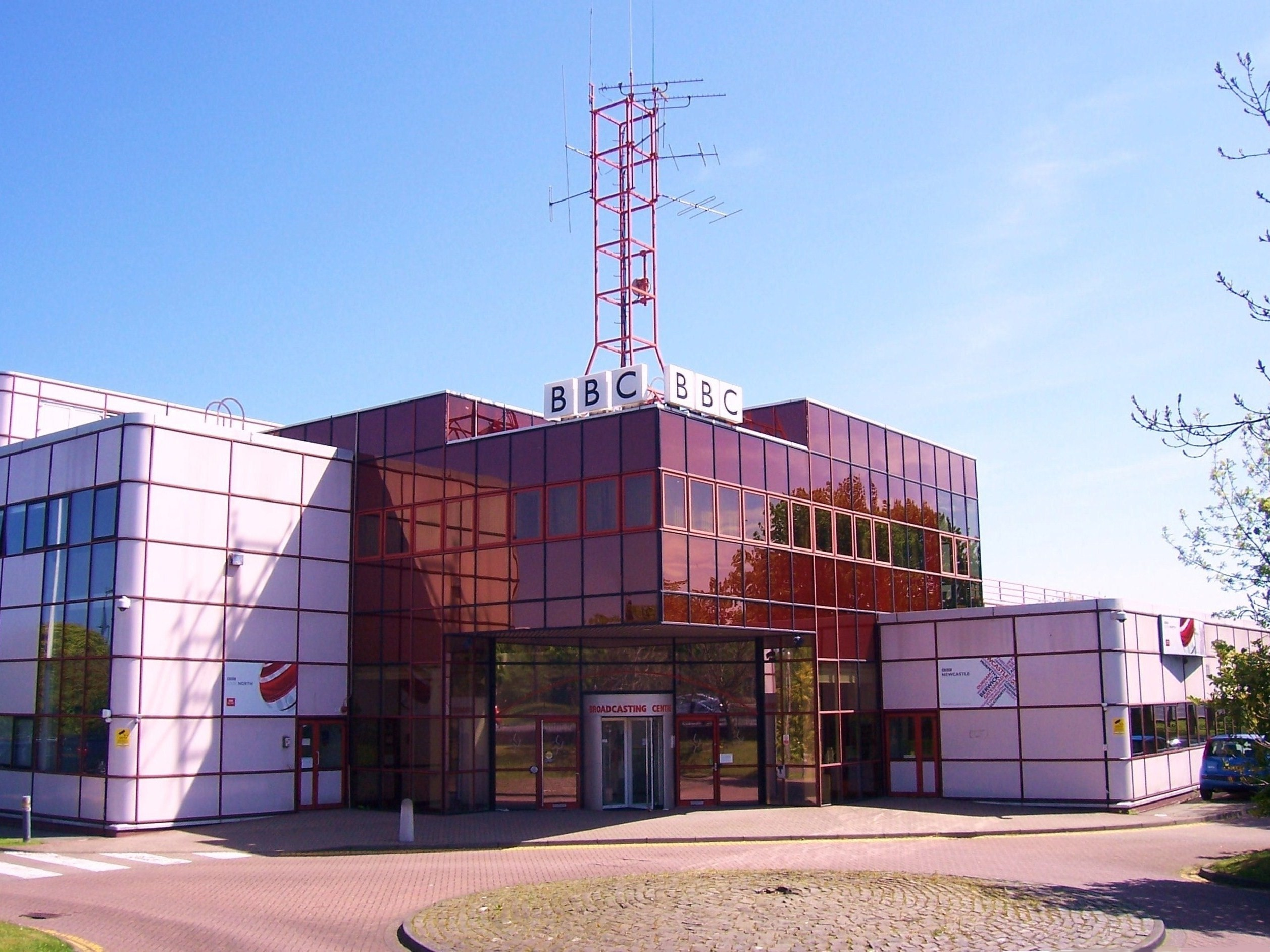
Broadcasting Centre in Spital Tongues, Newcastle upon Tyne.

BBC North East & Cumbria has its headquarters and studios at the Broadcasting Centre, Spital Tongues, Newcastle upon Tyne. The first live broadcast from the building was on Saturday 16 January 1988, with the first Look North broadcast the following Monday. The building itself housed two studios, A and B, with the studio complex housing the regional news team, BBC Radio Newcastle and some network productions, with BBC North East specialising in children's television. Look North was based in the large studio A, but moved to the smaller studio B when a network production was using studio A. Look North was permanently moved to studio A in 2000 following the reduction in the number of network productions. This move prevented the studio itself from being closed, as happened in the Midlands and the North West; the studio was not too big, so could house the programme comfortably. The building itself has distinctive architecture, with glass panels and walls coloured in varying shades of pink, resulting in the building gaining the nickname from local residents and staff of "The Pink Palace".

Prior to the move to the Broadcasting Centre, the BBC was based at Broadcasting House at New Bridge Street in Central Newcastle, in a former lying-in hospital, which housed the news service, a TV production studio, used predominantly for Look North, a second TV presentation studio and BBC Radio Newcastle. This building, in a central location in the city on New Bridge Street, proved just big enough for their needs. However, when technology needed upgrading, it turned out to be easier to build a new studio complex, rather than refit the small building. It was last used on Friday 15 January 1988.

In addition to their headquarters, BBC North East and Cumbria has local radio stations and news bureaux located in Middlesbrough and Carlisle.

== See also ==
- BBC English Regions
