= Smooth North East =

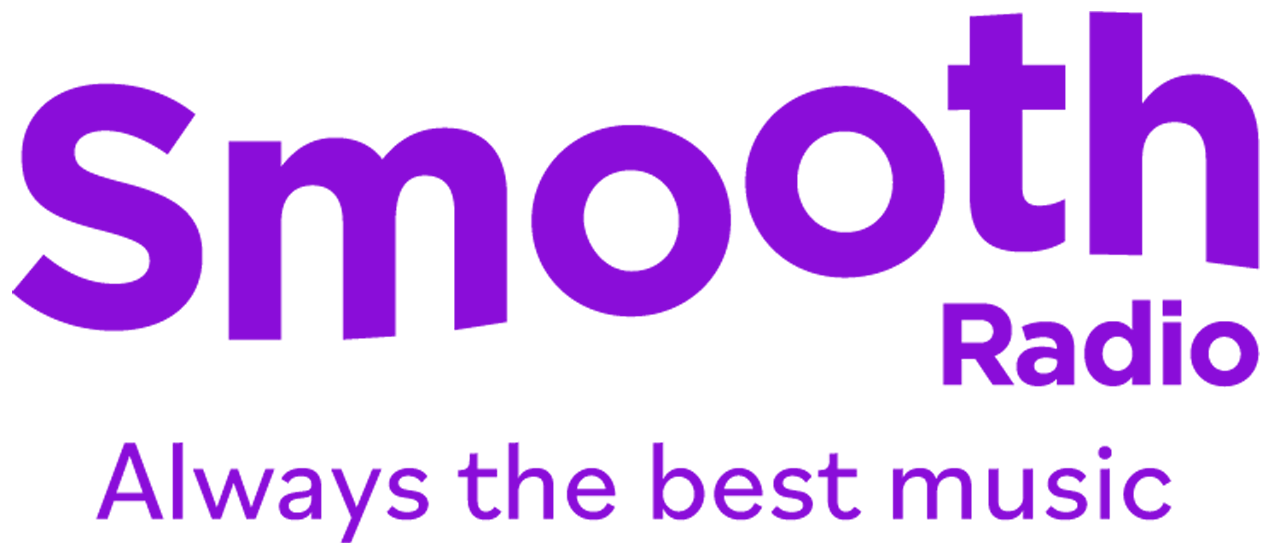
- Nunthorpe; England
- Broadcast area: North East England and North Yorkshire
- Frequencies: DAB: 11B Bauer Teesside; DAB: 11C Bauer Tyne and Wear; FM: 97.5 MHz Tyne and Wear; FM: 107.7 MHz Nunthorpe; FM: 107.5 MHz Fenham; FM: 96.4 MHz Hexham
- Branding: Always The Best Music for the North East

Programming
- Format: Soft Adult Contemporary
- Network: Smooth Radio network

Ownership
- Owner: Communicorp
- Operator: Global
- Sister stations: Capital North East; Heart North East

History
- First air date: 8 January 2008

Links
- Webcast: Global Player
- Website: www.smoothradio.com/northeast/

Smooth North East is a regional radio station owned by Communicorp and operated by Global as part of the Smooth network. It broadcasts to North East England.

== Overview ==
=== GMG Radio ownership ===
The licence for the station was originally awarded to the Saga Radio Group. However, GMG Radio inherited it following its purchase of Saga in December 2006. GMG had been granted permission by the regulator, Ofcom, to change the format of its Smooth FM stations in London and Manchester, and took the decision to change both the Smooth FM and Saga Stations to a new brand, Smooth Radio.

Test transmissions for Smooth Radio North East began on 22 November 2007, and an advertising campaign was launched in the region from Boxing Day. This included television commercials featuring images of some of the music industry's most notable artists, such as Buddy Holly, Diana Ross and Rod Stewart. The station launched at 8am on 8 January 2008. The music format of the station was middle of the road, adult contemporary music, aimed at an audience aged 45 and over.

Local programming originated from studios at Team Valley, Gateshead. Networked programming was syndicated from sister station Smooth North West at Salford Quays, Manchester.

In 2010 GMG Radio announced that it would be merging its five Smooth stations in England to create a nationwide Smooth Radio service based in Manchester. The new station was launched on 4 October 2010 and could be heard both on DAB and on the locally on the FM frequencies.

=== Global Radio franchisee under Communicorp ownership ===
Smooth Radio's output was relocated to new owner Global's Leicester Square headquarters from 1 October 2013, a move that coincided with a major overhaul of its schedule, and the closure of Smooth 70s after 21 months on air.

Global reached an agreement to sell Smooth North East and seven others to Communicorp, as part of a plan to allay competition fears following Global's purchase of GMG Radio.

On 4 February 2014, the Radio Today website reported that Ofcom had given Global permission to remove Smooth from the Digital One platform, and to replace it with a service playing music from the 1970s, 80s and 90s. Under this agreement, Smooth would continue to broadcast on its regional frequencies, but would be required to provide seven hours of local output per day.

The local studios are shared with Global-owned stations Capital North East and Heart North East. In May 2015, all three stations moved to new studios at Wellbar Central in Newcastle city centre.

In September 2019, following OFCOM's decision to relax local content obligations from commercial radio, Smooth's local Drivetime and weekend shows were replaced by network programming from London. Local news bulletins, traffic updates and advertising were retained, alongside the station's North East breakfast show.

== Programming ==
As of 22 February 2025, programming is broadcast and produced from Global's London headquarters, or studios in Birmingham and Manchester.

=== News ===
Global's Newsroom broadcasts regional news bulletins from 6am-7pm on weekdays and 6am-12pm at weekends.

== Former notable presenters ==
- Emma B
- Simon Bates
- Tony Blackburn
- Carlos
- Daryl Denham
- Mark Goodier
- David Jensen
- Donny Osmond
- Lynn Parsons
- Andy Peebles
- Andi Peters
- Fiona Phillips
- David Prever
- Pat Sharp
- Chris Tarrant
- Kate Thornton
- Graham Torrington
- Clive Warren
- Pete Waterman
