= Burnhope transmitting station =

Transmitter station in County Durham, England

Burnhope
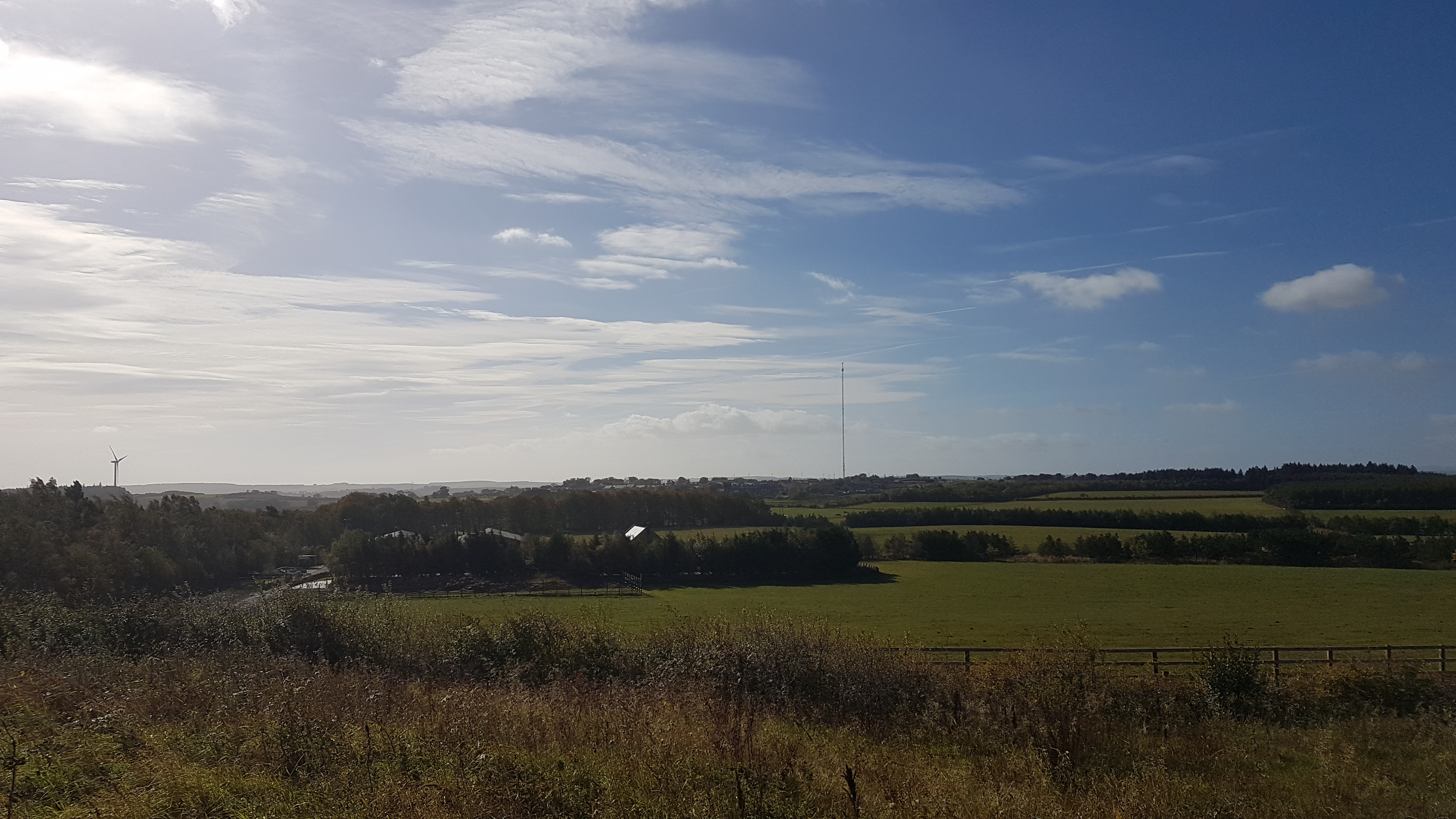
- Burnhope from Springwell Farm with Burnhope Television Mast in the background.

- Location within County Durham
- Location: Burnhope, County Durham
- Mast height: 228.6 metres (750 ft)
- Coordinates: 54.822°N 1.7145°W
- Grid reference: NZ184474
- Built: 1958
- ITV region: Tyne Tees Television (1959–1985)
- Local TV service: County Durham Television

The Burnhope transmitting station is a former television transmitter in County Durham in the north east of England. Designed specifically to broadcast the newly launched regional ITV contractor, Tyne Tees Television. It currently serves as a radio transmitting station

== History ==
=== Construction ===
It was originally built by BICC for the Independent Television Authority (ITA) as its sole 405-line transmitting station service the Tyne Tees Television region.

It was the eighth ITA transmitter, to launch Tyne Tees, covering 2.66m people in the region, as far north as Alnwick. It was six miles north west of Durham, costing £30,000

=== Transmission ===
Test transmissions started at 9am on 1 December 1958, approximately one month before the launch on Tyne Tees Television on 15 January 1959.

It was built close to the existing BBC Band I station at Pontop Pike. This was the eighth transmitter opened by the ITA.

From the station's 750 foot mast, transmissions from Burnhope were on VHF Channel 8 at a peak vision ERP of 100 kW, successfully covering a region spanning the North Yorkshire moorlands and Teesside in the South, to the remote upper reaches of Northumberland in the North.

With the advent of UHF with its 625-lines, the adjacent Pontop Pike transmitting station carried these services to the Newcastle and County Durham area from 1967 onwards, confining Burnhope to 405-line transmission. In due course, further main UHF transmissions were established at Bilsdale West Moor (serving North Yorkshire and Teesside) and Chatton (serving upper Northumberland).

The transmitter would later get a new lease of life with the advent of Independent Local Radio (commercial radio or ILR). Burnhope extended its remit by providing the transmissions for the first ILR service in the North East of England – Metro Radio on 97.0 MHz (now on 97.1 MHz).

After the 405-line television service ceased in January 1985, Metro Radio was for many years, the only broadcasting duty performed by the transmitter until the early 1990s, when a new tranche of commercial radio (regional) became available.

On 1 September 1994, the transmitter started broadcasting the first new regional radio service to the North East. Launched as Century Network, it then broadcast as Real Radio (North East) and is now Heart North East. It was followed almost five years later (1 June 1999), by Galaxy North East, now Capital North East.

== TV returns ==
In between the launch of the first two regional services, a new television service launched in 1997. March 1997 saw the launch of Channel 5, with Burnhope, along with a number of other ITA-built transmitter stations which had not been used since the 405-line closure, broadcasting the new television service.

Channel 5's analogue transmission from Burnhope ceased upon closure of the analogue TV service in the North East of England, which took place in the final phase of the digital switchover in September 2012. Channel 5 would then only be available digitally via the Pontop Pike transmitting station.

== Further radio ==
Two further analogue radio services would launch using this transmitter. On 5 December 2005, Durham FM (now used by Sun FM, now Nation Radio North East) launched a low-powered service to County Durham with a third and final regional service launched on 8 January 2008 (Smooth North East).

The transmitter is also used to carry the two local DAB signals (Bauer Digital) locally, and MXR Digital regionally.

== Services available ==
=== Analogue radio ===
Frequency	kW	Service
97.1 MHz	10	Hits Radio North East (Burnhope)
97.5 MHz	9	Smooth North East (Tyneside)
101.8 MHz	10	Heart North East (South Shields)
102.8 MHz	0.5	Nation Radio North East (Durham)
105.3 MHz	10	Capital North East (Tyneside)

=== Digital radio ===
Frequency	Block	kW	Operator
220.352 MHz	11C	4.8	Bauer Tyne & Wear

=== Analogue television ===
==== 15 January 1959 – 3 January 1985 ====
Frequency	VHF	kW	Service
189.75 MHz	8	100	Tyne Tees

==== 30 March 1997 – 26 September 2012 ====
Frequency	UHF	kW	Service
847.25 MHz	68	50	Channel 5
