= Capital North East =

Coordinates: 54.9739°N 1.6197°W

- Newcastle upon Tyne; United Kingdom
- Broadcast area: North East England and parts of North Yorkshire
- Frequencies: DAB: 11B Bauer Teesside; DAB: 11C Bauer Tyne & Wear; FM: 105.3 MHz Burnhope; FM: 105.6 MHz Fenham; FM: 105.8 MHz Hexham; FM: 106.4 MHz North Yorkshire
- RDS: Capital
- Branding: The North East’s No.1 Hit Music Station

Programming
- Format: Contemporary hit radio
- Network: Capital

Ownership
- Owner: Global Radio

History
- First air date: 1 June 1999; 27 years ago (as Galaxy 105–106)

Links
- Webcast: Global Player
- Website: www.capitalfm.com/northeast/

Capital North East is a regional radio station owned and operated by Global as part of the Capital network. It broadcasts to North East England.

The station launched on 1 June 1999 as Galaxy 105–106, renamed in 2006 as Galaxy North East and rebranded on 3 January 2011 as Capital North East.

== History ==
=== Galaxy North East ===
Originally called Galaxy 105–106, presenter Steve Furnell launched the station on 1 June 1999—with "What You Need", by Powerhouse, being the first record played.

The station was based in Wallsend, North Tyneside at the Silverlink Business Park, 6 miles (9.7 km) east of Newcastle City Centre.

The name was changed to Galaxy North East in 2006, in line with other Galaxy stations. This year also saw a change in demographic from 15–29 to 15–34 and a new strapline of "Passion for Music, Passion for Life". Two years later, the slogan was changed to "Love Music". In 2008, they also changed their output format to include a more mainstream playlist. During late 2010, the slogan changed to The North East's No.1 Hit Music Station.

Networked programming was broadcast from Galaxy Yorkshire in Leeds.

=== Capital North East ===
The station was rebranded as 105–106 Capital FM on 3 January 2011, as part of a merger of Global's Galaxy and Hit Music networks to form the nine-stations of Capital. Steve Furnell and Karen Wight remained on breakfast with Roger 'Bodg' Howard on drive time.

Kim Miljus was appointed managing director of Capital North East, replacing Matt Bashford, she was the former station director of Metro Radio. Giles Eyre-Tanner became the station's programme controller on 5 October 2011, replacing Stuart Barrie.

Long-serving Capital Breakfast presenters Steve Furnell and Karen Wight left Capital North East to join rival station Metro Radio and TFM, Capital Drivetime presenter Roger "Bodg" Howard, producer Matt Bailey and Take Me Out contestant JoJo Hatfield took over from the duo on 3 January 2012. 2010 Student Radio Awards winner Rob Howard joined the station and presented Capital Drivetime for three years. From 30 November 2015 Gogglebox star Scarlett Moffatt replaced Hatfield for a year. On 19 June 2017, former Miss Newcastle winner Hannah Gray took over from Moffatt.

In May 2015, Capital North East moved to new studios at Wellbar Central in Newcastle city centre, shared with sister station Heart North East and Communicorp-owned Smooth North East.

On 26 February 2019, Global stated the station's local Capital Breakfast and weekend shows would be replaced with networked programming from 8 April 2019. The weekday local Capital Drivetime show was retained, alongside news bulletins, traffic updates and advertising. "Bodg", Matt Bailey and Hannah Gray left the station whilst Martin Lowes remains.

== Transmission ==
Capital North East broadcasts on 105.3 MHz at a power of 10 kW from the Burnhope Transmitter, on 105.6 MHz at a power of 0.5 kW from the Fenham Transmitter for West Newcastle, 105.8 MHz at 0.1 kW from the Newton Transmitter for the Hexham area and on 106.4 MHz at 8.9 kW from the Bilsdale Transmitter for Teesside although coverage unintentionally extends much further.

== Programming ==
All programming is broadcast and produced from Global's London headquarters.

Global's newsroom broadcasts hourly localised news updates from 6am-6pm on weekdays and 8am-12pm at weekends.

== Notable former presenters ==
- Sacha Brooks
- Rich Clarke
- Charlotte Crosby
- David Dunne
- Andi Durrant
- Stephanie Hirst
- Greg James
- Scarlett Moffatt
- Adele Roberts
- Steve Sutherland
- Margherita Taylor
- Tiësto
- Neil 'Roberto' Williams
