= Chatton transmitting station =

Transmitter station in Northumberland, England

Chatton
- Location within Northumberland
- Mast height: 161.0 metres (528 ft)
- Coordinates: 55.5319°N 1.8342°W
- Grid reference: NU1046426476
- Built: August 19 1974
- BBC region: BBC North East and Cumbria
- ITV region: ITV Tyne Tees

The Chatton transmitting station is a broadcasting and telecommunications facility, between Wooler and Seahouses, Northumberland. It is owned and operated by Arqiva, and situated within the boundary of Bewick and Beanley Moors SSSI.

== History ==
On Thursday February 12 1970, outline planning permission was given for a 500ft UHF 'booster station', known as a relay, at Chatton Sandyfords. In September 1970, the ITA wanted a transmitter by 1972, in Glendale Rural District.

By 1972, it was hoped to be built by 1974. Glendale Rural Council gave full planning permission for a 500ft mast on Thursday March 8 1973. The ITA in August 1973 said that the Chatton Moor transmitter would start in 1974.

30,000 viewers would view BBC and ITV television from Monday August 19 1974.

== Services listed by frequency ==
=== Digital radio (DAB) ===
Frequency	Block	kW	Operator
225.648 MHz	12B	3.2	BBC National DAB

=== Digital television ===
Frequency	UHF	kW	Operator	System
538.000 MHz	29	10	SDN	DVB-T
554.000 MHz	31	10	Arqiva A	DVB-T
602.000 MHz	37	10	Arqiva B	DVB-T
634.000 MHz	41	20	BBC A	DVB-T
658.000 MHz	44	20	Digital 3&4	DVB-T
682.000 MHz	47	20	BBC B	DVB-T2

==== Before switchover ====
Frequency	UHF	kW	Operator
626.166 MHz	40+	6	BBC (Mux 1)
650.166 MHz	43+	6	SDN (Mux A)
674.166 MHz	46+	6	BBC (Mux B)
682.166 MHz	47+	2	Arqiva (Mux C)
706.166 MHz	50+	6	Digital 3&4 (Mux 2)
714.166 MHz	51+	2	Arqiva (Mux D)

=== Analogue television ===
Analogue television is no longer available from Chatton; BBC2 analogue was closed on 12 September 2012, followed by the remaining three channels on 26 September 2012.

Channel 5 was not available from Chatton on analogue but could be received from Burnhope instead on channel 68 in the south of Chatton's transmission area, or on channel 52 from Selkirk in the north of the transmission area.

Frequency	UHF	kW	Service
615.25 MHz	39	100	BBC1 North East
639.25 MHz	42	100	Channel 4
663.25 MHz	45	100	BBC2 North East
695.25 MHz	49	100	Tyne Tees

== See also ==
- List of masts
- List of radio stations in the United Kingdom
