= BBC Radio Tees =

Coordinates: 54°34′33.7″N 1°14′29.5″W

- Middlesbrough; England
- Broadcast area: Northern North Yorkshire and south-east County Durham
- Frequencies: FM: 95.0 MHz (Teesside & Bilsdale); FM: 95.8 MHz (Whitby); FM: 104.0 MHz (Darlington); DAB: 11B (Teesside); Freeview: 714
- RDS: BBC Tees

Programming
- Language: English
- Format: Local news, talk and music

Ownership
- Owner: BBC Local Radio, BBC North East and Cumbria

History
- First air date: 31 December 1970
- Former names: BBC Radio Teesside (1970–1974); BBC Radio Cleveland (1974–2007); BBC Tees (2007–2020)
- Former frequencies: 96.6 FM; 1548 MW

Technical information
- Licensing authority: Ofcom

Links
- Website: Website

BBC Radio Tees, formerly known as BBC Radio Teesside, BBC Radio Cleveland and then BBC Tees, is a BBC local radio station broadcasting from Broadcasting House, Newport Road, Middlesbrough. It broadcasts to parts of County Durham and North Yorkshire on FM, DAB, and digital TV, and nationally via BBC Sounds. Towns in the station's FM broadcast area include Darlington, Hartlepool, Middlesbrough, Stockton-on-Tees, and Whitby. According to RAJAR, the station has a weekly audience of 100,000 listeners and a 4.4% audience share as of December 2023.

== History ==
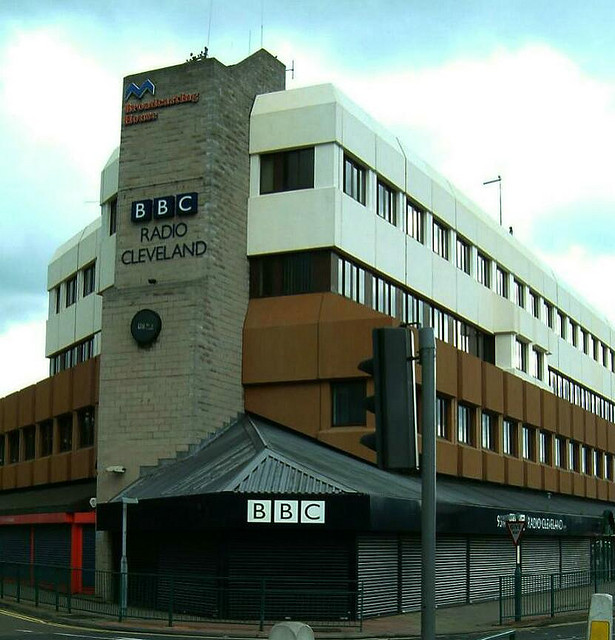
BBC Radio Cleveland - Middlesbrough in 2007

=== BBC Radio Teesside ===
The station was originally launched as Radio Teesside at 6 p.m. on 31 December 1970 with a local news programme entitled Teesside Tonight, presented by George Lambelle.

=== BBC Radio Cleveland ===
On 1 April 1974, the station became known as Radio Cleveland when the county of Cleveland was formed. The station moved to new studios in 1983. On 1 April 1996, the county of Cleveland was abolished and the unitary authorities of Stockton-on-Tees, Hartlepool, Middlesbrough, and Redcar and Cleveland were created. These four boroughs, along with nearby Darlington, now form the governmental sub-region of Tees Valley. Also included in the main coverage area is the Army's main garrison at Catterick Garrison, which is also included in the transmission area of Radio York on 104.3 FM.

=== BBC Tees ===
Former logo

On Saturday 11 August 2007, the station was renamed BBC Tees. The BBC Tees brand was already associated with its "Where I Live" website and "BBC Bus", which have both since been discontinued.

=== BBC Radio Tees ===
On 27 January 2020, the station was renamed BBC Radio Tees. The addition of "radio" to the names of most BBC local radio stations was to avoid confusion with its similarly named TV news regions.

Colin Bunyan is currently the longest-serving presenter at BBC Radio Tees, hosting the Sunday afternoon Vintage Vinyl programme. He has been a presenter for over 47 years.

== Technical ==
Before moving to Eston Nab, the signal on 95 FM originally was relatively strong and originated from the 900-foot Bilsdale transmitter on the North York Moors. A relay transmitter covering the town of Whitby broadcasts on 95.8 FM.

The DAB signals come from the Bauer 11B multiplex at Eston Nab (near the A174 road) and Brusselton (near Shildon between the A68 and A6072).

On 10 August 2021, FM transmission was knocked off air indefinitely following a fire at the Bilsdale site. It is feared that the structural integrity of the transmitter mast may have been compromised. As at 11 August 2021, the 95 FM service is available again, using the Eston Nab transmitter, but it does not reach all areas of the station's transmission area. A temporary transmitter on 104.0 FM has also been instated for Darlington and the surrounding areas.

The station also broadcasts on Freeview TV channel 714 in the BBC North East and Cumbria region and streams online via BBC Sounds.

The station was also broadcast on 1548 kHz medium wave (194 metres in wavelength) from the Stockton transmitting station until 17 April 1992.

== Programming ==
Local programming is produced and broadcast from the BBC's Middlesbrough studios from 6 am to 10 pm each day.

From 10 pm each night, BBC Radio Tees carries the England-wide late show and from 1 am, it simulcasts BBC Radio 5 Live.

== Presenters ==
=== Notable presenters ===
- Ali Brownlee
- Colin Bunyan
- Marian Foster
- Richard Hammond
- Sue Sweeney
