= ITV Tyne Tees =

ITV television franchise for North East England

- Logo used since 2013

- The Tyne Tees region of the ITV network
- Type: Region of television network
- Branding: ITV1
- Country: United Kingdom
- First air date: 15 January 1959; 67 years ago
- TV transmitters: Pontop Pike, Bilsdale, Chatton (formerly Burnhope)
- Headquarters: Gateshead (previously Newcastle upon Tyne)
- Broadcast area: County Durham; Cumbria (Alston area); Northumberland (majority); North Yorkshire (part); Teesside; Tyne and Wear
- Owner: ITV plc
- Dissolved: lost on-air identity on 27 October 2002 (now known as ITV at all times)
- Former names: Tyne Tees Television (1959–1969); Tyne Tees (1969–1996, 1998–2002); Channel 3 North East (1996–1998), ITV1 Tyne Tees (2002–2004)
- Picture format: 1080i HDTV, downscaled to 16:9 576i for SDTV
- Affiliation: ITV
- Official website: itv.com/tynetees
- Language: English

ITV Tyne Tees, previously known as Tyne Tees, Channel 3 North East and Tyne Tees Television, is the ITV television franchisee for North East England and parts of North Yorkshire.

Tyne Tees launched on 15 January 1959 from studios at a converted warehouse in City Road, Newcastle upon Tyne, remaining in the city until July 2005 when Tyne Tees moved to smaller studios in Gateshead. Tyne Tees has contributed various programming to the ITV network and Channel 4, as well as its regional output. Some of Tyne Tees' best known programming includes the groundbreaking music show The Tube, critically acclaimed adaptations of Catherine Cookson novels, and children's programmes such as Super Gran.

The ownership and management structure of Tyne Tees has altered across its history, particularly in various mergers with Yorkshire Television. The two stations were managed by Trident Television during the 1970s, and the two stations merged again in 1992 to form Yorkshire-Tyne Tees Television. A series of takeovers and mergers across the ITV network, instigated by the large franchisees Granada and Carlton, led to Tyne Tees becoming part of ITV plc in 2004. The licence is currently held by ITV Broadcasting Ltd and the original Tyne Tees Television Ltd was dissolved on 28 March 2017.

The analogue signals in the Tyne Tees region were switched off in 2012, making the station, along with ITV London and UTV, one of the last ITV regions to become digital-only.

== History ==
=== Launch and the 1960s ===
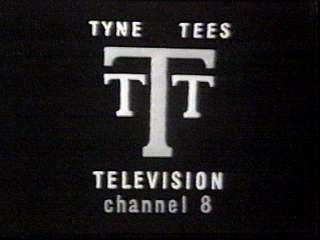
The station's first logo. The three Ts morphed from an anchor, reflecting the nautical influence of the station's name.

Independent television was introduced to Britain in September 1955. Initially only available in the London region, commercial television steadily became available in other regions. After a financially difficult time for the first ITV companies, the Independent Television Authority (ITA) decided to offer independent television to the rest of the country and advertised for bids. Several offers were submitted, including from the existing four companies, to the ITA. North East England was the last of the English regions without a television transmitter. Sir Richard Pease headed a local consortium that included film producer Sydney Box and News Chronicle executives George and Alfred Black. This consortium, was chosen from among eleven applicants because of its strong local links, commitment to local programming, concentrating on regional topical matters, and educational and children's programmes. The contract was awarded on 12 December 1957. Experienced television executive Anthony Jelly was appointed as managing director, although historian Andrew Spicer credits the Black brothers as the driving force and public face of Tyne Tees; George was programme director, and both brothers were prominent board members. The company opened its first Newcastle office at Bradburn House on Northumberland Street, and it was from there, on 3 January 1958, the company directors issued 300,000 ordinary shares at fours shillings each.

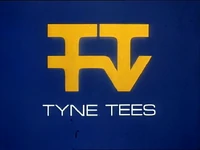
Tyne Tees logo used from 1970 to 1992

Tyne Tees is named after two of the region's three primary rivers. ITA considered the original name, "North East England", was imprecise. Some of the consortium's suggestions were rejected: "Three Rivers Television" for being obscure, and "Tyne, Wear, and Tees" for being too long. Eventually, in October 1958, the name "Tyne Tees" was announced. The other major river, the Wear (which runs between the Tyne and the Tees), was represented within Tyne Tees' early signature tune "Three Rivers Fantasy".

The BBC transmitted their programmes from the Pontop Pike transmitting station in County Durham. The ITA built a new transmitter nearby at Burnhope, to cover an area from Alnwick to Northallerton, and west to Middleton-in-Teesdale. Television sets required a new aerial, the Yagi array, to receive the high frequency that the transmitter was using.

Tyne Tees went on air at 5 p.m. on 15 January 1959, three years after the first British independent television station, and the tenth such station to launch. The then-prime minister Harold Macmillan, who had been the Member of Parliament (MP) for the nearby Stockton-on-Tees for two decades, was interviewed live on the opening night. This was followed by a live variety show, named The Big Show, broadcast from a small studio. However, this local content was followed by an episode of the American police series Highway Patrol and an evening of entertainment programmes including I Love Lucy and Double Your Money. The full first night's programming was

17:00 Three Rivers Fantasy – opened by the Duke of Northumberland.
17:15 The Adventures of Robin Hood
17:40 Popeye
17:55 ITN News
18:05 North-East News
18:15 The Prime Minister greets the people in the North-East, with interviews from Adrian Cairns and hosted by Bill Lyon-Shaw
18:25 Strange Experiences, narrated by Peter Williams
18:30 Highway Patrol
19:00 The Big Show, starring Dickie Henderson
20:00 Double Your Money, starring Hugh Green
20:30 This Week
21:00 Wagon Train
22:00 ITN News
22:15 Murder Bag
22:45 Sports Desk, introduced by George Taylor
22:55 I Love Lucy
23:25 Epilogue read by the Bishop of Durham, performed by the North Seaton Colliery Brass Band, and sung by several choruses

In the 2006 documentary A History of Tyneside, veteran North East newsreader Mike Neville suggested that the launch of Tyne Tees enabled local people to be able to hear local accents and dialects on television, since early broadcasters, particularly those from the BBC, tended to speak in Received Pronunciation. Scholar Natasha Vall suggests that the station's commitment to broadcasting comedy helped establish a regional identity. George and Alfred Black had toured working men's clubs looking for material for television. Local comic Bobby Thompson was invited to host a solo show. However, poor ratings and an unenthusiastic cast led to the show's cancellation after barely a year.

Where most independent television companies published their schedules in the magazine TVTimes, Tyne Tees produced their own listings magazine. The Viewer was published by News Chronicle, a company with connections to the station through the Black brothers. It was produced to satisfy " 'Tyne Tees' policy to be most regional of all the independent stations". Initially produced from an office in Forth Lane, near Newcastle station, it moved to the City Road studios when Dickens Press took over publication in 1963. The magazine became the biggest selling magazine in the region, with a circulation of 300,000 per week. New contracts issued by the ITA in 1968 stipulated that all ITV companies publish their listings in the TV Times, which became a national magazine with regional variations for the listings. After 498 editions, the last issues of The Viewer was published in September 1968.

The first advertisement screened on Tyne Tees was for Welch's Toffee. The proprietor's niece is Denise, who would become a well-known actress and personality. In 1959, Tyne Tees charged advertisers £100 for 15 seconds during prime time. The station launched a marketing campaign in the 1960s to sell advertising time named 'Through Plan'. One of the range of promotional material was a poster called 'Sweet Sixteen', featuring photographs of 15 men accompanied by their full names, job titles and other formal history. The sole woman was simply referred to by her first name and her measurements. Historian Geoff Phillips comments that this "was a profound statement of the culture of the time". Tyne Tees produced Advertising Magazines (admags), programmes with a loose storyline designed to advertise several products within an edition. Each 15-minute programme had about 12 product endorsements. Clients sat in the control room during rehearsals to ensure that their products were getting the exposure for which they had paid.

A committee was established in 1960 under the leadership of British industrialist Sir Harry Pilkington to consider the future of broadcasting. The 1962 Pilkington Report criticised ITV, and Tyne Tees in particular. Some companies, historian Simon Cherry notes, were scrambling "very readily for the lowest common denominator ... Tyne Tees was notorious for avoiding minority programmes and putting out cop shows or westerns instead."

=== 1970s ===
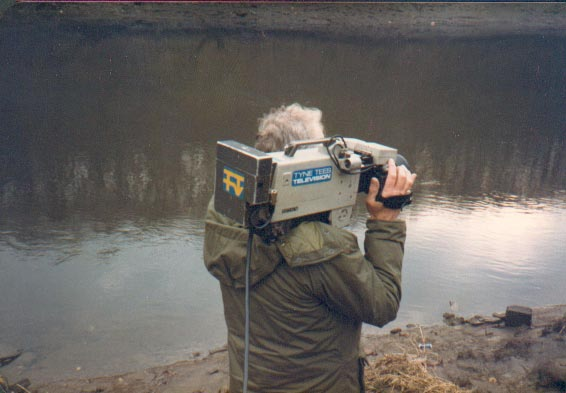
Tyne Tees cameraman on the banks of the River Wear in 1982.

Following his report, Pilkington prompted the government to impose a levy on ITV's revenue, the effects of which were heightened by a recession in 1970 when revenue had declined by 12 percent in real terms. Despite a reduction of the levy, Tyne Tees was one of the contractors facing collapse. To ensure Tyne Tees' survival, the ITA allowed it to affiliate with Yorkshire Television under a joint management company named 'Trident Television'. The third 'prong' of Trident was intended to be Anglia Television, but the IBA ruled out their involvement. Trident Television was formed in March 1969 as a joint venture to sell advertisements for Tyne Tees and Yorkshire. Yorkshire and Tyne Tees then came under Trident's ownership on 1 January 1974. Peter Stanley Paine, Director of the broadcaster's holding company Trident, was appointed managing director of Tyne Tees Television in 1974.

For the first time, one company owned two distinct and separate ITV franchises although the new company was dominated by the larger, stronger Yorkshire whose shareholders owned 71.5 percent of the new company. Trident had sales offices in London, where most agencies are located and where most advertising is bought and sold.

A major factor in the merger was that when UHF transmission was introduced in 1969 to accommodate colour television it was found that the key Bilsdale transmitting station in North Yorkshire so dominated the territories of both companies that its allotment to either individual company would have seriously prejudiced the coverage and sales revenue of the other. The ITA agreed that Tyne Tees and Yorkshire could be considered as one company for the purposes of selling airtime, while expressing their individual identities in their programming output.

A political scandal caused problems during one of Tyne Tees' franchise renewals. Producer Tony Sandford recalls that Lord Pilkington was sent by the ITA to question the station's executives. One-time leader of Newcastle City Council T. Dan Smith had been convicted for accepting bribes concerning the redevelopment of Newcastle city centre. Pointing out that Smith became a director of the station, Pilkington asked why Tyne Tees failed to produce a documentary about a Newcastle politician, instead leaving it to Manchester-based Granada's current affairs programme World in Action. By the late seventies, Tyne-Tees's locally made programming amounted to an average of less than nine hours a week, with the remainder of programming from the ITV network. In 1978, The Economist reported that a group called Northumbria Television, partially financed by local firms Bellway Holding and Swan Hunter, applied to the IBA to take over the franchise from the "tired" Tyne Tees for the two and a half years until the scheduled franchise renewal in 1981.

=== 1980s ===
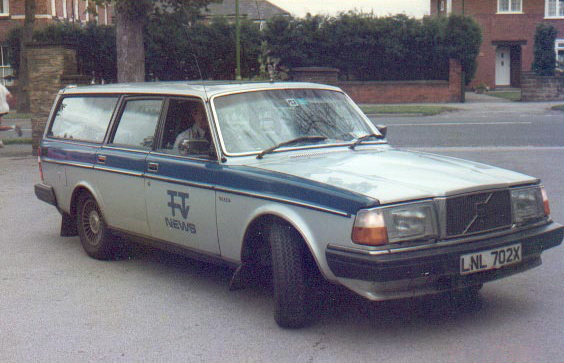
Tyne Tees News Unit car.

Yorkshire and Tyne Tees applied separately for renewal of the franchises in 1980, and each won. However, the two companies were required to demerge from January 1982 as a condition of the renewal of their ITV franchises. The Independent Broadcasting Authority (IBA), the successor to the ITA, recognised the criticism, reported The Economist, "that Trident was London-dominated, overly diversified, and out of touch with the grass roots. It instructed Trident to set up both companies as independents and to retain only a minority shareholding in each." The IBA imposed the condition that for the 1980 franchise round a company could only own one franchise, although it could earn up to 30 percent of another. By November 1981, Trident had sold all but residual stakes in the two companies (15% and 20% respectively). When the new licences started in January 1982, Trident sold all but 30 percent of Yorkshire, and 25 percent of Tyne Tees.

During the 1980s, Tyne Tees began to develop separate services for the Northern and Southern halves of the region. From a small two-camera studio at Corporation House in the centre of Middlesbrough, Tyne Tees developed nightly opt-out news bulletins for Teesside, County Durham and North Yorkshire as part of the flagship magazine programme Northern Life. The company also pioneered non-news programming for the two sub-regions, including the nightly Epilogues, which ended a 29-year run in September 1988 when Tyne Tees commenced 24-hour broadcasting, although Tyne Tees had run an on-screen Jobfinder teletext service throughout the night since November 1987.

Meanwhile, developments in satellite and cable television, in addition to the two BBC channels and the new Channel 4, began to put pressure on ITV's finances. ITV lost 3 percent of advertising between 1993 and 1994.

=== 1990s ===
==== 1993 Franchise Round and Yorkshire-Tyne Tees merger ====
In 1990, Yorkshire bought Vaux Breweries' 19 percent stake in Tyne Tees, costing £5.1 million. In the same year, Prime Minister Margaret Thatcher initiated a blind auction system, through the Broadcasting Act 1990, through which companies had to bid for the regional franchises. This system was to be used in the 1991 franchise round, which caused large changes to the network. Granada Television, the franchise holder for North West England, had long thought that the North of England should consolidate to "counter the potential dominance of the south east". Tyne Tees outbid their main competition by £10 million; their main challenger was 'North East Television', which was backed by Granada, Border and local newspaper the Evening Chronicle. Along with HTV and Yorkshire, Tyne Tees believed that they had to bid high to win. These companies bid so high that the Independent Television Commission seriously considered rejecting the business plans of each in turn and disqualifying them. However, they eventually decided in their favour. Together, the now-merged companies were committed to paying about £60 million a year to the government for the right to broadcast, a substantial amount compared to the £2,000 bid by Central, ITV's largest station.

New regulations from the ITC allowed Yorkshire to merge with Tyne Tees, this time under the name Yorkshire-Tyne Tees Television plc (YTT), although their ITV franchises remained separate. The merger allowed the companies to avoid collapse following their high franchise bids. This was the first step to ITV becoming one company in England and Wales. The merger led to the culling of staff. YTT's two largest shareholders became Pearson and LWT. From 1 January 1993, Yorkshire and Tyne Tees broadcast all regional programmes simultaneously, affecting programming that had been shown at different paces in different regions (such as Blockbusters and the Australian soap operas The Young Doctors and Prisoner: Cell Block H). Most of the regional programming was produced by Yorkshire and broadcast across the two stations, an area that the ITC considered too broad to be of local interest.

==== Broadcasting standards ====
The annual cost of the franchise began to take its toll on the company. At the end of 1993, the company revealed that it was heading for a pre-tax loss in the 1992–93 fiscal year instead of the expected profit. Chairman and chief executive Clive Leach was sacked as a consequence. According to Variety, YTT "oversold its airtime to advertisers and failed to meet its ratings targets, resulting in a huge revenue shortfall estimated by analysts at over $20 million." The industry newspaper also reported that the company "attempted to bolster its flagging 1992–93 revenues by giving advertisers deep discounts for advance airtime bookings made for the following year." Local MP Peter Mandelson wrote to the Secretary of State for National Heritage, David Mellor, in June 1992, saying "Yorkshire and Tyne Tees are motivated by the interests of their shareholders, not their viewers, and need to make urgent savings ... it is quite clear that this is not so much a merger but a gobbling up of a smaller franchise held by a larger company."

Yorkshire-Tyne Tees were repeatedly warned over worsening standards at the Newcastle-based station and at one point the Independent Television Commission (the then-governing body of ITV) threatened to revoke the Tyne Tees licence if the situation did not improve. In 1993 the MP Ann Clwyd described Tyne Tees as having been "stripped of any meaningful identity since its take over by Yorkshire TV" and Ian Ritchie, Managing Director at Tyne Tees, left the company over a widely publicised disagreement with the Yorkshire-Tyne Tees board over what he saw as an unacceptable drive to centralise the company, including the complete closure of all non-news operations at Newcastle and a proposal to close the City Road studios. In October 1993, Yorkshire TV's founder Ward Thomas was brought in to stabilise the situation at the company and quickly returned the company to profitability.

==== Bruce Gyngell appointed chair ====
The Channel 3 North East branding, introduced in 1996, was derided by viewers. Granada removed the branding in 1998.

Bruce Gyngell, the former chairman of breakfast station TV-am, became YTT's managing director on 15 May 1995. On 16 March 1996, the presentation department in Newcastle was closed, and continuity was centralised in Leeds. (Transmission for the station had already been handled by Yorkshire since 1993). To halting "a slide in viewing figures and reflecting confidence in the region", in September that year, Yorkshire-Tyne Tees Television plc rebranded its stations as Channel 3. The Broadcasting Act 1990 had made Channel 3 the 'official' name for ITV, and "3" was the preset used by most television sets and videocassette recorders (VCRs) for ITV. However, the attempt in 1989 to create a generic identity across the ITV network was decommissioned within three years. Promoting the new brand, Gyngell said, "Everyone refers to this region as 'the North-East' and we want it to be known that we are part of this great region and moving with it." Tyne Tees acquired the brand "Channel 3 North East", with 'Tyne Tees Television' still being retained as the company name.

==== Acquisition by Granada ====
On 26 June 1997, Yorkshire-Tyne Tees Television plc was acquired by the Granada Media Group plc (now ITV plc). The takeover concentrated ownership of the ITV network into three large groups: Granada, Carlton and United News & Media.

The new guidelines, published by the ITC in 1998, about the Channel 3 licence renewals signalled substantial cuts in the companies' payments to the Treasury. Licences awarded in 1991 were due to expire in January 2001. However, companies, including Tyne Tees, which had bid high in 1991 were allowed to apply early to try to win financial relief. The new 10-year contract began in January 1999. In 1999, the cost of the tender fee that Tyne Tees was paying fell to £46 million, from the £70.5 million that it paid in 1998.

=== 2000s ===
This logo, used from November 1999 until October 2002, was generic to the ITV network, with each region's familiar logo appearing in a smaller form. The "ITV1" logo was added to the logos and idents in August 2001.

The design of the 2006 to 2013 logo was generic to the ITV network.

==== ITV centralisation ====
Days after the two largest companies in the network, Granada and Carlton, announced that they would merge, the regional names were withdrawn from networked programming in an "attempt to make ITV1 more marketable nationally with a single generic brand." (Scottish, which does not trail any of the network shows under any ITV1 branding, Grampian, Ulster and Channel, each kept their own names but used their own versions of the new look.) Tyne Tees Television was rebranded as ITV1 Tyne Tees on 28 October 2002. The name "Tyne Tees" only appeared before regional programmes; the rest of the time, only the "ITV1" name was shown. The Tyne Tees logo continued to appear after its own programmes. Graeme Thompson was appointed MD and Controller of Programmes at ITV Tyne Tees in 2004, having been appointed Director of Broadcasting in December 1997 and then Controller of Programmes in 2001. He became Dean for Arts, Design and Media at the University of Sunderland in June 2009.

In 2004, Granada plc and Carlton Communications merged, creating a single company for all ITV franchises in England and Wales. Tyne Tees became part of ITV plc, the largest television production company in the world, which now owned 90 percent of ITV.

On 9 February 2005, Ofcom issued a proposed timetable for ending analogue terrestrial television transmissions as part of the switchover to digital television. Tyne Tees was the penultimate region to cease broadcasting in analogue, which occurred during September 2012. Tyne Tees took over the relay transmitter at Berwick-upon-Tweed in December 2006 from Border Television in order to extend the deadline of the town's upgrade to digital TV by four years, since Border was the first to switch off its analogue signal in 2008.

In September 2007, Executive Chairman of ITV plc Michael Grade announced that as part of ITV's five-year business strategy, Tyne Tees' newsroom would merge with Border Television. Politicians have expressed concern, however, that the merger would affect the quality of news for southern Scotland, in particular, would fail if it lost its customised bulletins. The changes would mean that aside from the merged Border-Tyne Tees regional news and political programmes, the station could broadcast only 25 minutes of dedicated North East news every weekday. In October 2008, the National Union of Journalists threatened industrial action if ITV tried to force any of the changes without discussion. Between December 2008 and February 2009, around 50 staff at the station were made redundant or accepted voluntary redundancy, including presenters, journalists and production staff. The new merged ITV Tyne Tees & Border service launched on 25 February 2009.

==== Bullying at Tyne Tees ====
In March 2009, The Guardian newspaper reported that there was bullying at Tyne Tees that lasted for six years. One manager was accused of using inappropriate language about people with disabilities, women reporters, Chinese people and Romani people. The manager was disciplined after one inquiry, but then more journalists complained about the same manager. The manager defended himself by claiming he was using black humour. He finally left the company with a pay-off of about £50,000. The original whistleblower left the company in 2006 and was paid £80,000 after threatening to take his case to an employment tribunal. Following this incident, ITV adopted an anti-bullying programme. An ITV spokesman advised that the total cost of the five bullying investigations was £1 million.

=== 2010s ===
On 23 July 2013, proposals to reintroduce fully separate regional news services for the ITV Tyne Tees and ITV Border regions were approved by OFCOM. On 16 September 2013 both ITV News Tyne Tees and Lookaround were restored as two single 30-minute regional programmes on weekdays with separate shorter daytime and weekend bulletins reintroduced.

== Studios ==
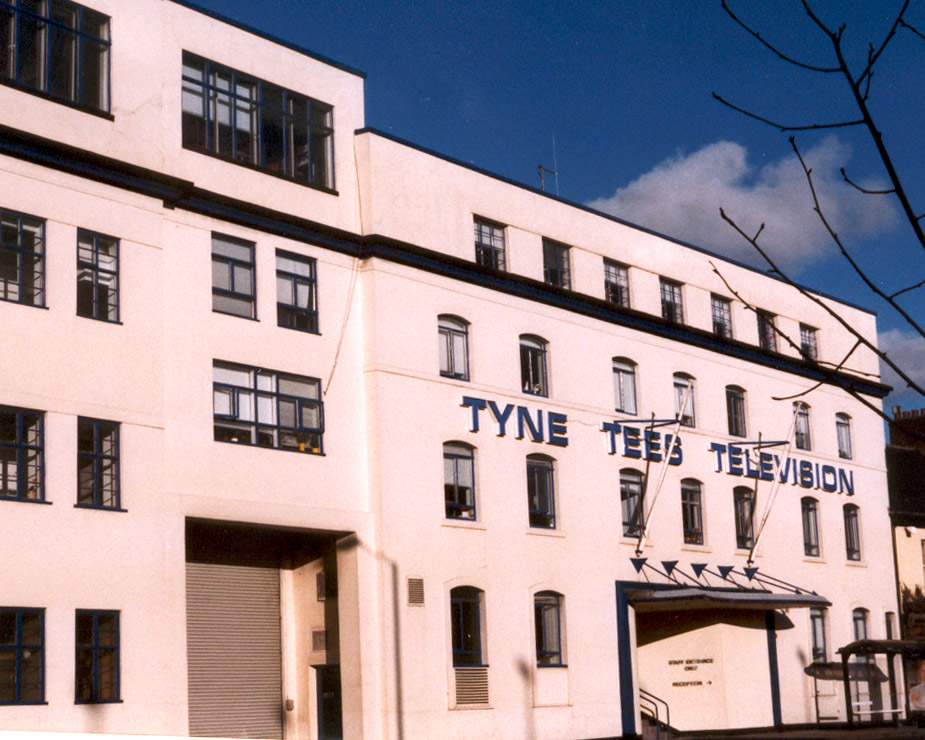
Two converted warehouses provided the base for Tyne Tees on City Road until 2005.

Tyne Tees's original studios were located on City Road, Newcastle upon Tyne and were converted from two furniture warehouses purchased by the company. These new studios formed the basis of Tyne Tees operations and featured the company offices. The location was deliberately chosen because of its proximity to the telephone exchange in Carliol Square. Television signals were relayed by land-line from the studios to the switching centre; a distance between the studios and the exchange greater than 1 mile (1.6 km) would have significantly increased the cost of receiving the networked programmes from the other ITV stations.

The complex initially contained four studios, with a fifth built in 1981 to accommodate productions for Channel 4. Two nearby pubs, The Egypt Cottage and Rose & Crown, became affectionately known as Studio 5 because of the amount of time that the station's staff spent in them. Scottish and Newcastle Breweries offered to sell the adjacent The Egypt Cottage to the station when it was established, but Tyne Tees declined. However, the upstairs room was used as rehearsal space, and the pub would regularly feature in the '80s music show The Tube.

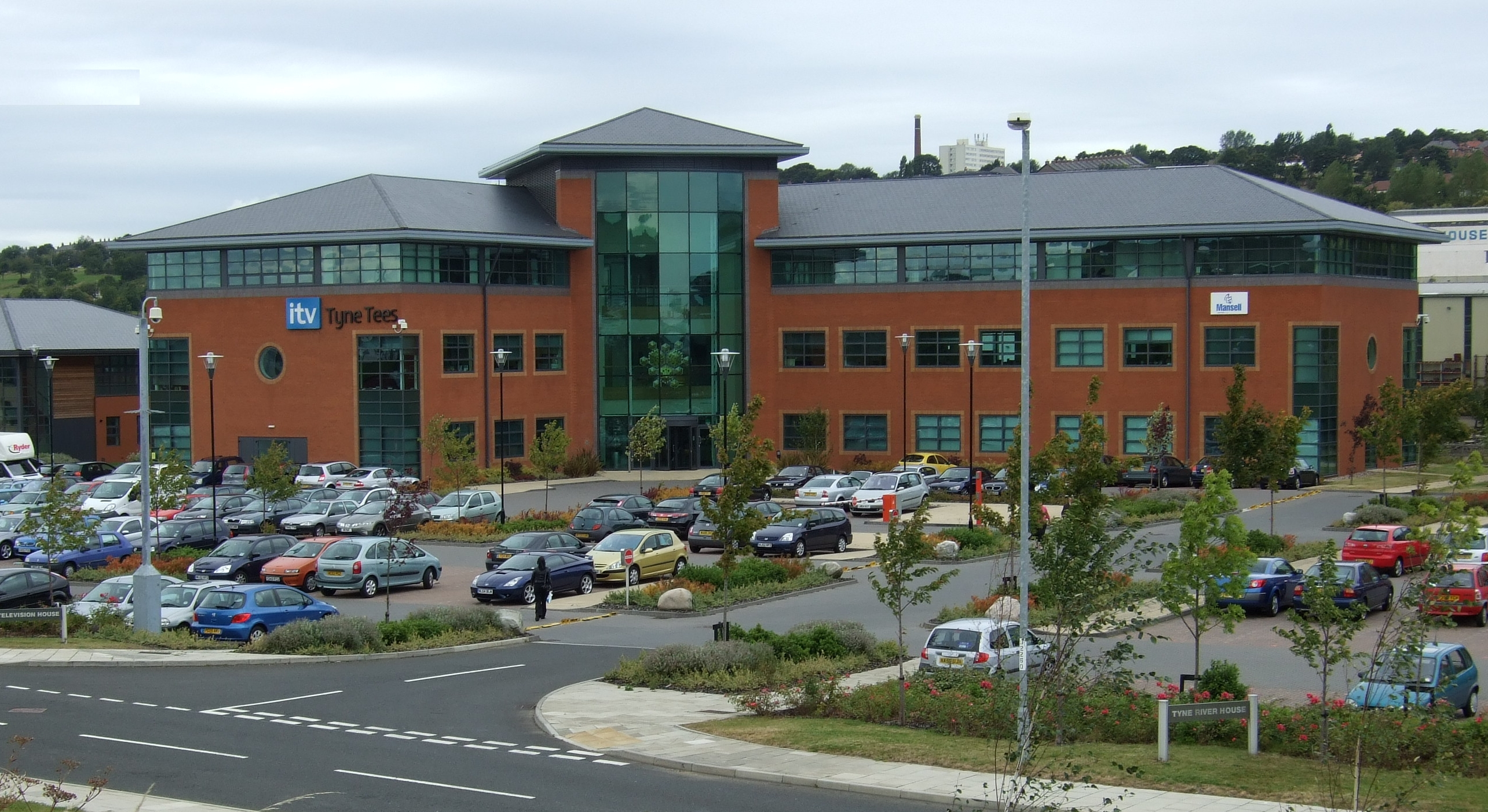
Tyne Tees has been based on the Gateshead bank of the River Tyne, just south of the mouth of the River Derwent, since July 2005.

The complex continued until 2004 following the merger of Granada and Carlton to form ITV plc. As a result of the merger, ITV plc had (according to the company) an over-capacity of studio facilities and production units around the country, which had previously been rivals, but were now all part of the same group. In order to save money, several large regional headquarters, studio sites and programme departments closed and merged. The decision was taken to close the City Road studios and relocate to a smaller purpose-built complex housing a newsroom and studio, resulting in the loss of up to 30 jobs. A documentary about the move to new premises, The Big Move, reflected that over the years the staff numbers had dropped by about 800, and around 170 people would be moving to the new site.

Tyne Tees moved to Television House at The Watermark, a new business park adjacent to the MetroCentre in Gateshead, in 2005. The first broadcast from their new base took place on 2 July 2005. Along with the move, news reporters had to learn a range of new skills, such as editing their own reports. The new practices contrasted with early reporting, which had an average crew of five. The new equipment required only a camera operator, who could also operate sound equipment, and a reporter. Television House also acts as a base for ITV SignPost, Britain's biggest supplier of British Sign Language (BSL) services for television, video, CD-ROM, DVD, film and the Internet.

In 2010, the studios at City Road along with the neighbouring pub, the Egypt Cottage, were demolished with plans for a residential development on the site.

Tyne Tees also has smaller studios and offices in Billingham, York, London and within the Media Centre at the University of Sunderland.

== Sub-regions ==
Tyne Tees operated two sub-regional news programmes from around 1983 until 2009, having been a commitment in the 1980 contract round. An opt-out was used from the main Northern Life bulletin was launched to provide localised news from each area. These two sub-opts were:

- Tyne Tees North – Broadcasting from the Pontop Pike and Chatton transmitters to viewers in Northumberland and Tyne and Wear. Bulletin presented by normal team from Newcastle Studio.
- Tyne Tees South – Broadcasting from the Bilsdale transmitter to viewers in County Durham, North Yorkshire and Teesdale. During the 1980s and early '90s, this was a recorded segment (complete bulletins during weekday afternoons) presentation of which alternated between Newcastle and Middlesbrough studios (Tyne Tees was unable at the time to broadcast different content live to both transmitters simultaneously and so had to pre-record the southern opt even when presented from Middlesbrough). From 1993 to 1995 a completely separate broadcast "Network North" was produced from new studios in Billingham (this was intended by YTTTV to be broadcast on some YTV transmitters, and was advertised in the press as such, but in reality it went out on Tyne Tees only. Both local news programmes were renamed Tyne Tees News in 1996). From September 1996 a live 15-minute broadcast from Billingham was inserted into "North East Tonight", which continued until 2005 when separate live programmes were produced from the Gateshead studios, before these ended in 2009. For nearly a decade during the 1990s and 2000s, the Billingham studios were used for the pan-regional late weekday bulletin, and for a time in the early 2000s Billingham was also used for a sub-regional version of "North East Today", a daytime magazine programme.

As part of a cost saving initiative within ITV plc, Michael Grade announced in 2007 that the regional news service would be reduced from seventeen distinct news programmes and services to nine, affecting all the sub-regional services. As a result, all Tyne Tees sub-opts were ceased immediately. As part of the same plans, he also announced that Tyne Tees would be merged with Border Television, subject to Ofcom approval which occurred the following year, resulting in one large programme covering both regions. The two services were demerged in September 2013 and ITV News Tyne Tees and ITV Border once more began making their own 30 minute news programmes, although unlike other ITV regions which had offered sub-regional services, the Tyne Tees opt-out services were not reinstated at this time.

== Station identification ==
The station identification, or idents for short, of Tyne Tees varied over time; however, most were based the letters TTTV arranged in a box format. The launch ident featured a white anchor which then gradually turned into three letter T's alongside each other. This ident was accompanied by a shortened version of the station's signature tune "Three Rivers Fantasy", a specially commissioned work by composer and arranger Arthur Wilkinson. The musical overture merged several regional folk tunes, such as "Water of Tyne", ending in The "Blaydon Races". Part of the medley was based upon "The Sailor's Hornpipe".

The arrival of colour to ITV on 15 November 1969 led the companies to re-evaluate their on-screen identities. Tyne Tees replaced the triple-T logo on 17 July 1970 with the basic layout of two letter Ts above 'TV', an icon which would be incorporated into many future redesigns. Commentator Andrew Bowden observes that this interlinked design remains strongly associated with the company. The ident also introduced the blue and yellow colour scheme that would remain in use for many years. The dark blue was popular amongst ITV contractors because it closely approximated to black on a black and white television set. The version of the logo included the word 'COLOUR', boasting the new technology.

On 24 October 1979, the ident was modified once more to remove the word 'colour' and to give it a more dynamic form up. The result was the yellow logo flying down onto a black background before the outline extended out towards the screen, set to a synthesised tune. The name 'Tyne Tees' then flew in below and the background colour faded to blue.

The ident was again redesigned on 5 September 1988, in which the colour scheme was reversed and lighter shades of blue and yellow used. The form up was also altered to water flowing along sand, before the water divided into the Tyne Tees logo. The logo used computer animation for the first time.

However this bold new look was not to last, as Tyne Tees adopted the 1989 ITV generic look on 1 September. The look consisted of the top left corner of the logo being inserted into the 'V' segment of the ITV logo, with the station name placed underneath the Tyne Tees ITV logo. However, not every ITV station embraced the new logo, and Tyne Tees abandoned it on 24 February 1991.

On 25 February 1991, the generic ident were replaced with ones produced by Tyne Tees, featuring a large reflective block which the viewpoint rotated around, before panning up to reveal it is the Tyne Tees logo. The music from the previous generic look was retained. Three variations were used, one with a black background, one with a multi coloured background and one with a grey background, with each version taking over from its predecessor after only a few months of use.

On 5 October 1992, Tyne Tees dropped their famous logo which they had previously been using since 1970 and opted instead for four separate letters stacked atop each other like previously accomplished spelling TTTV. The form up was over a grey background with a line moving across the screen, forming the letters as they went.

When Tyne Tees adopted the Channel 3 North East branding in September 1996, the traditional "TTTV" logo arrangement was dropped in favour of a large '3', with the region written to the left of the '3'. The name "Tyne Tees Television" was only seen in small letters at the bottom of the screen, whereas Yorkshire, who also adopted the Channel 3 brand a month later, was allowed to keep its 'chevron' logo alongside the '3'. On-screen announcements said, "This is Tyne Tees Television, broadcasting on Channel 3 in the North-East." The new branding was launched on 2 September 1996, with "Going Home (The Theme of the Local Hero)" by Mark Knopfler regularly accompanying ident sequences. Following Granada's takeover in June 1997, the Channel 3 branding was scrapped in March 1998. As Bob Conlon, regional executive with the Independent Television Commission, said: "People never really grasped the name – it didn't exactly trip off the tongue and it was still referred to as Tyne Tees Television, because it has been there for years." All other regions in the network had retained their own identities rather than conforming to the generic 'Channel 3' brand.

The "TTTV" logo returned to television screens in a new form, "three-dimensional gold metallic lettering on a blue background", on 9 March 1998. This logo was more stylised than the 1992 equivalent and kept the music used throughout the '3' era. However, dual branding with the "ITV" name was introduced a year later, as part of the 1999 generic look. In this, the Tyne Tees logo was reduced to minuscule lettering in a blue box at the top of the screen, with emphasis being placed on the station name and ITV logo. However, this ident was supplemented by an ident to introduce local programming. This ident introduced on 4 September 2000 featured a new logo: a TTTV variant that was simplified to strictly vertical, horizontal or diagonal lines only. An arc of circles also adorned the top right corner. The ident itself featured pictures from the region. However, despite the new logo, the new logo wasn't applied to the generic idents.

From 28 October 2002, all network programmes were introduced with a generic ITV1 ident. Regional programming used a generic ident with the name Tyne Tees below the ITV1 logo until November 2006, after which no regional idents existed. The Tyne Tees logo was last seen on production end boards until 2004, when they were replaced with, first an ITV logo, and then with an ITV Studios caption.

== Programming ==
The station's founding executives George and Alfred Black used their theatrical background to produce a lot of light entertainment programming on Tyne Tees in the early years. One of the best known was The One O'Clock Show, a 40-minute variety show broadcast on weekdays. After 1,098 editions and more than five years on air, the final show was broadcast in March 1964. Some editions of The One O'Clock Show were produced by David Croft, who would go on to co-write many BBC situation comedies. For Tyne Tees, Croft also directed and produced the Ned's Shed and Mary Goes to Market admags, as well as producing his first sitcom, Under New Management, set in a derelict pub in the North of England.

The bulk of Tyne Tees' output has been its regional programming, consisting of news, current affairs and local interest. Its longest running news programme was Northern Life, which ran from 1976 to 1992. The main news show has been rebranded several times; the current version is ITV News Tyne Tees. Until December 2008, local-interest programming was usually broadcast at 19:30 on Thursdays, which are low-profile slots due to the high-rating EastEnders being broadcast at those times on BBC One. Local non-news programming was also broadcast on early Sunday evenings and various late slots following News at Ten on Tuesday and Thursday nights. Such documentaries concentrate upon local history, landscape and architecture, such as the various shows by John Grundy. A monthly political programme, Around the House, continues to be produced for the Tyne Tees and Border regions.

Tyne Tees was obliged to contribute programming for the ITV network, although the bulk of network programming was purchased from the largest stations. Tyne Tees contributed game shows to the network, including Crosswits (1985–98) and Chain Letters (1987–97). Tyne Tees became a prolific producer of children's entertainment for the ITV network in the 1970s and 1980s. From the late 1970s, it produced series such as The Paper Lads, Quest of Eagles, Barriers and Andy Robson. This continued into the 1980s with Madabout, How Dare You!, Gilbert's Fridge and weekday pop-music show Razzamatazz, a pop programme that attracted many major recording artists to appear in a 17:15 slot. Tyne Tees also managed the production of Get Fresh, a Saturday morning show hosted in various weeks by different ITV regions. Super Gran, based on a series of books about a grandmother with superhuman powers, was also successful in the mid-1980s. Additionally they also dubbed the South African children's series Oscar the Rabbit in Rubbidge which featured narration by Lance Percival.

With independent production company Festival Films and Television, Tyne Tees produced several adaptations of books by local novelist Catherine Cookson. The second dramatisation, The Black Velvet Gown, was the number one drama of 1991, winning an Emmy Award for best TV drama. Long-running soap opera Coronation Street was briefly produced at Tyne Tees' City Road studios in 1963 while all of the studios at the show's home, Granada Television in Manchester, were occupied by a production of the opera Orpheus in the Underworld. However, not all of the station's output has been successful. The 1997 soap opera Quayside was axed after 17 episodes after competing with the BBC's EastEnders.

Tyne Tees has also produced a wide range of music programming. One of the first attempts at reaching the teenage audience was Young at Heart, hosted by Jimmy Savile and Valerie Masters in 1960. In 1979, Tyne Tees launched two national series, Alright Now and Check it Out, the latter a mix of rock music and segments on youth-oriented social issues; among performances by established acts, the two shows offered early exposure to bands linked to the North East, notably Dire Straits and The Police.

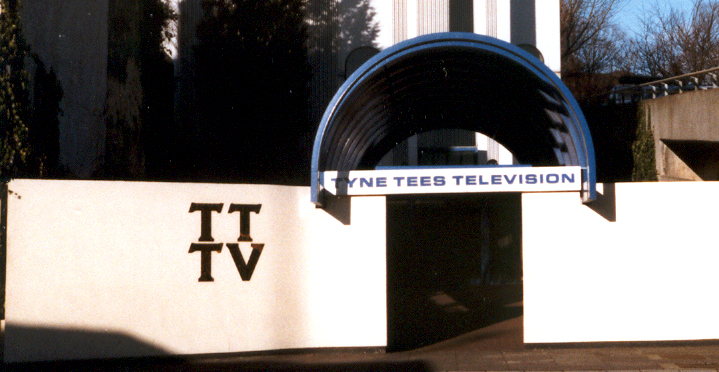
The public entrance to Studio 5 at City Road gave The Tube its title.

The most famous music show from the station, though, derived its name from the studios themselves. Produced for Channel 4, and first broadcast three days after the new station's launch in November 1982, The Tube acquired its name from the architecture of the public entrance to Studio 5, from where the show was broadcast, at the City Road complex. Under the direction of Gavin Taylor, The Tube filmed rock band Queen's 1986 Wembley concert for later broadcast and video and DVD release. Cameras bearing the Tyne Tees logo can be seen throughout the concert. The Tube was dropped in 1987 as a result of falling audience figures and an incident involving Jools Holland, who cursed during a live trailer. A couple of months later, Tyne Tees launched another music show, this time for the ITV network. Whereas The Tube featured rock and punk bands and emerging musicians, Tyne Tees' The Roxy, concentrated on the mainstream UK singles chart. The show suffered, however, from not having a regular slot on the ITV network. Also, unlike The Tube, which had gained a loyal fanbase and respect from artists, mainstream acts were reluctant to travel to Newcastle for a three-minute performance when they could appear on the BBC's more established Top of the Pops in the more accessible London.

ITV regional service
New service as Tyne Tees Television	North East England; 15 January 1959 – 24 February 2009 (on-air brand & franchise); 25 February 2009 – present (franchise only)	Succeeded by ITV Tyne Tees & Border
Preceded by ITV Tyne Tees & Border	North East England; 16 September 2013 – present	Current provider as ITV Tyne Tees
