= Alan Roberts (broadcaster) =

Alan Price-Roberts or Alan Roberts (born 19 July 1946) is an English radio presenter, producer and actor.

== Broadcasting career ==
Originally from Marlow, Buckinghamshire, Roberts was the station programme director with The Voice of Peace during a journey through the Suez Canal in January 1977. Founded by Jewish businessman Abie Nathan, the "Peace Ship" broadcast highly successfully to millions of Israeli and Arab listeners from the Mediterranean Sea off the coast of Tel Aviv. It was staffed by a multi-national group of mainly Christian DJs and crew members, and gave several young broadcasters their first taste of radio.

He first started broadcasting on British radio in 1977 at BBC Radio Oxford, one of a generation of British broadcasters that included Timmy Mallett, David Freeman, Martin Stanford, Garry Richardson, Guy Michelmore and Peter Grant.

After several years with the Radio Oxford, Alan joined Swansea Sound replacing John Sachs. He then moved to Severn Sound where he was Head of Music and their first voice on air. Subsequently, he moved to GWR FM Bristol as afternoon presenter, replacing Paul Phear who had left to join Chiltern Radio.

In 1989, Roberts joined BBC Radio 2 as the producer of The Gloria Hunniford Show, then Ed Stewart and Derek Jameson. He also produced the final Sounds Easy series with David Jacobs and regular series with Benny Green, Alan Titchmarsh and Martin Kelner. He also produced documentary series on Dusty Springfield, Cher, Elkie Brooks, the Decca Records Story and The Vipers Tale a three-part documentary about the life of his friend Wally Whyton.

Whilst at Radio 2 Roberts clandestinely broadcast on the satellite radio network Quality Europe FM as DJ Paul Revere, presenting the Saturday Afternoon Soft Rock Show for about two months in 1990.

In 1996, Roberts left Radio 2 and joined the BBC World Service where he produced Bob Holness, Tommy Vance, Sarah Ward (director) and the last two years of Country Style with Wally Whyton before he died in 1997. He presented Country Style for a short while before the programme, closely associated with Whyton, finally ended.

== Acting and other work ==
As an actor, Roberts has appeared in Robin of Sherwood for HTV, Boon for Central TV, and Reasonable Force and Casualty, for BBC TV. Alan has also featured in minor acting roles in several other UK Television series e.g. 'Crossroads' 'Zero Option' 'Jamaica Inn' 'Return to Treasure Island' 'The Puppet Man' and films 'Far from the Madding Crowd' 'Husbands' and 'Those Magnificent Men'. He has directed a concert and documentary television programme on Claudia Hirshfeld for German TV.

He moved to Torquay in 2000 and set up Quay Productions, a small-scale production company making local history, art and travel programmes for digital television networks and occasional documentaries for BBC networks and local radio. Since 2005 he has been mainly engaged in painting but makes occasional programmes for BBC local radio.

In 2009 Alan joined up again with The Voice of Peace in Israel and now syndicates two weekly programmes and presents the daily Afternoon Delight weekdays. He also airs the same shows to The Voice of Peace International who broadcast from Stoke-on-Trent in UK rather clandestinely and via the internet. In 2011 also joined up with Hometown Radio Station Marlow FM and now presents a weekly Country Show called Americanza and Alien's Blues Cruise for them.
