= BBC Thames Valley FM =

BBC Local Radio station in Oxfordshire and Berkshire, England

England
- Broadcast area: Oxfordshire and Berkshire
- Frequency: FM

Programming
- Language: English
- Format: Local news, talk and music

Ownership
- Owner: BBC Local Radio

History
- First air date: 9 April 1996
- Last air date: 14 February 2000

BBC Thames Valley FM was the BBC Local Radio station covering the English counties of Oxfordshire and Berkshire, broadcasting between 1996 and 2000.

== History ==
BBC Thames Valley FM began on 9 April 1996 following the merger of BBC Radio Oxford and BBC Radio Berkshire. At launch the new station broadcast its own output from 5 am to 1 am seven days a week, although this was later cut back with the introduction of regional programming in the evenings. The initial presenter line-up included Andrew Peach and Phil Kennedy, Bob Harris on Sunday afternoons and Martin Kelner on Friday nights. There were separate news bulletins for the two counties.

In September 1998, a new jingle package composed by David Arnold was introduced and the 'FM' suffix was dropped from the station name. Shortly afterwards separate breakfast and drivetime programmes for Oxfordshire and Berkshire were introduced.

The merged station was not popular with listeners, and in August 1999, as part of the BBC South East Review, it was announced that BBC Radio Oxford and BBC Radio Berkshire would regain their own identities. The two stations relaunched on 14 February 2000, although most output continued to be shared and their programme schedules remained unchanged. However, by 2004 the two stations' schedules had become fully separated.

== See also ==
- BBC Radio Oxford
- BBC Radio Berkshire
