= Henry Wymbs =

Henry Wymbs (born 11 November 1947) is a retired radio presenter in the United Kingdom. He presented ‘Irish Eye’, a weekly Irish music programme broadcast from Oxford across BBC Radio Oxford, BBC Radio Berkshire and online via BBC Sounds.

== Life ==
Born on his parents’ farm near Cliffoney in Co. Sligo, Ireland, the eldest of ten children. Wymbs moved to England in the late 1960s where he forged a successful career with Thames Valley Police. Since retiring from the police force he has been championing Irish music in the UK, first appearing on BBC Radio Oxford in 1996.

Wymbs lives in Oxfordshire with his wife and has adult sons.

== Career ==
In 1968, Wymbs was working as a garage apprentice when he decided to move to England to join the police force after seeing an advert for recruits in the News of the World. He chose to move to Oxford as it was one of only a handful of forces that he was tall enough to join. He spent 30 years in the force, becoming a plainclothes officer and retiring as a Chief Inspector.

Wymbs began his media career writing a newspaper column in the Irish Post for 20 years.

During his time with Thames Valley Police, he was appointed press officer and became the face and voice of the service appearing on Sky News, Radio 4 and News at Ten.

He became the regular presenter of Irish Eye on BBC Radio Oxford in 1997 accompanied by fellow Irishwoman, Anne Morris. In more recent years, Wymbs had been joined on air by his wife, Sally. Due to wider BBC local radio changes and the Covid Pandemic, Irish Eye came to an end in 2020.

2014 saw Henry pen his first book "50 Years of Gaelic Games in Oxfordshire". Then in 2016 Wymbs published an autobiographical account of his journey from rural Irish life to becoming a successful radio presenter, "A Wymbsical Journey". He was honoured at a civic ceremony in Sligo following the release of his book as a tribute to his work in spreading the culture of Ireland in the UK. His most recent book is "On The Shoulders of Giants", a book which lets readers into the real lives of many of the Irish GAA's legendary footballers and hurlers.
