= Nathan Morley =

British journalist

Nathan Morley (born 14 January 1974) is an investigative journalist, television news anchor, and newspaper columnist based in Finland and Cyprus.

He contributed to radio broadcasts on Talksport, LBC, the BBC, CBS and Voice of America.

== Eurovision Song Contest ==
He was the English language Eurovision Song Contest 2009 radio commentator for the Cypriot state broadcaster, CyBC. The commentary in English marked a first for a non-English language EBU member. He also hosted national radio commentary the 2010, 2011 and 2012 Eurovision Song Contest.

== Broadcasting ==
His interviews include former US President Jimmy Carter, Archbishop Desmond Tutu, Greek Prime Minister George Papandreou, Tassos Papadopoulos, Glafkos Klerides, George Vassiliou, Terry Waite, Sir David Hannay, Rafik Hariri, Mehmet Ali Talat, Bülent Ecevit, Álvaro de Soto, Ingrid Betancourt and Rauf Denktaş. He took leave from daily radio in 2003 and was based in the Middle East where he collaborated with the late Tareq Ayyoub who was killed by US gunfire, during the Iraq War of 2003.

A library of his interviews are housed at the British Library Sound Archive in London.

== Television and radio ==
Morley is a national radio and television presenter with Cyprus Broadcasting Corporation (PIK/CyBC), where he presents the Weekend Evening News on television and a weekday radio programme on CyBC Radio 2 called 'Round and About' which includes news interviews, interspersed with music and comments from listeners.

His weekly nostalgia programme Nicosia Calling on Radio 2 features songs and performances from Hollywood, Broadway and Tin Pan Alley and includes live weekly interviews with entertainers from the last century.

He is the only LBC radio personality to have maintained a weekly uninterrupted live feature, which has broadcast continuously over 10 years at 5.30 on Thursday mornings, making it the longest running live slot since the station's launch in 1973.

In addition to domestic television, he reports for the international German TV and radio network Deutsche Welle (DWTV).

He is one of the main presenters on Home and Travel TV on Sky Digital in the United Kingdom, where he hosts several travel related programmes and chat shows.

Morley is the Cyprus correspondent for the Voice of America, Vatican Radio and ORF Radio Austria (Radioprogramme des Österreichischen Rundfunks).

During the 2003 US invasion of Iraq he was a presenter with the USA Radio Network (reporting from the Iraqi border), co-hosting and reporting for all of the networks news programs. The USA Radio Network coverage won a prestigious Katie Award in 2004, and Morley anchored several US national news shows which were transmitted live across the USA.

He has also reported for the network radio division of CBS News from Jordan, Turkey, Lebanon and Israel.

Morley was a regular voice on LBC radio in London from 2001, where he joined Steve Allen on Thursday mornings; he also reports for other LBC programmes. In late 2006 he joined Talksport as a reporter on the night time show with Ian Collins.

During the mid-1990s he was regular voice on Chris Tarrant's Capital FM breakfast news filing stories from Cyprus and the Middle East.

He broadcasts a weekly segment on BBC Radio Berkshire called Euro News, from the BBC studios in Cyprus, with Phil Kennedy.

== Awards ==
Morley was awarded the New York Festival's Silver World Medal award for broadcasting in 2001 at a ceremony in Manhattan in New York. He was presented with the gong by broadcaster Cousin Brucie from WABC. He also won the IPAR award in Italy for his presentation of The World This Week in 2005.

== Newspapers ==
Morley is a feature writer and journalist at the English language daily Cyprus Mail newspaper. He writes a weekly column for the Cyprus Observer newspaper. He is an occasional writer for the Daily Express in the United Kingdom. He also writes for the Brussels-based political newspaper New Europe.
