= The Superstation =

Independent Local Radio overnight sustaining service

- United Kingdom
- Frequency: Various

Ownership
- Owner: Richard Branson (1987–1989); Owen Oyston (1989–1990)

History
- First air date: July 1988
- Last air date: 6 October 1990

The Superstation (or Radio Radio as it was known in the industry) was set up in 1987 as an overnight sustaining service for Independent Local Radio. Launched in July 1988, the station broadcast from 10.00 pm until 6.00 am on many of the UK's commercial radio stations, as a more economically viable alternative to local programming.

== Brief history ==
The concept of the Superstation came from David Campbell and Rob Jones who worked for Virgin's radio arm and was backed financially by Richard Branson.

The service originally broadcast from British Forces Broadcasting studios in Paddington, London, but later moved to Manchester. By 1990, it was broadcasting across 21 stations and was mainly backed by Transworld Communications, together with GWR Group, Yorkshire Radio Network, Radio Trent and Radio Forth.

At this stage, Jonathan Ross and Ruby Wax had left the station and had been replaced by presenters such as Nigel Williams, Phil Kennedy and Peter Tait. Snooker player Steve Davis also had a specialist programme on the station at weekends.

On 6 October 1990, The Superstation closed down after giving only a few days notice, as the major shareholders were no longer prepared to finance the station due to the economic climate at the time.

== Technical ==
The Superstation commenced after the 10.00pm news bulletin; however, the service would leave a gap for local stations who had sold their own advertising air-time to "opt-out" of the national programme. A name check ident and a gap of around 1 second would be the signal for a tech-op to fire the carts containing the local adverts.

The typical duration for one of these ad breaks was either 2.10 or 2.40. So, in order to fill the gap, either four or five 30 second adverts and one 10 second jingle into the end sweeper would be used.

Each station had a log with the exact duration of each break.

Not all stations had their own ad breaks, so music montages would be played down the line to ensure there was continuous output. Later montages would be known as 'The Memory Module' and would include older tracks. A 3-5 second sweeper sound followed the montage and signalled the next part of the programme was about to start.

== Jingles ==
The station had a sung jingle package produced by Midlands-based music producer Muff Murfin and was co-produced by American jingle company TM Communications. These jingles were originally created for WTRK a.k.a. Electric 106 & WNVZ a.k.a. Z104 in the U.S. A few jingles and shouts included in the Superstation package identified the station as Radio Radio, however these were never used on air.

All of the original presenter line-up had several sung name checks, which were personalised versions of the generic Superstation jingles. They also had personalised "shouts", each with a loud and soft version. Later presenters, such as Phil Kennedy and Jeff Cooper generally used their own name idents.

The station also had American voice-over style "sweepers" voiced by John "J.R. Nelson" Marik who was part of the Z100 Morning Zoo from 1983 to 1986.

== Presenters ==
- Tony Adams
- Jeremy Beadle ('Beadle's Brain busters' )
- Jeff Cooper
- Francis Currie
- Steve Davis
- Chris Evans (now at Virgin Radio UK)
- Peter Grant
- Bob Harris (now at BBC Radio 2)
- Nicky Horne
- Erica Hughes (later with Saga 106.6 FM)
- Carl Kingston (later with Magic 828)
- Phil Kennedy
- John Kenning
- Deborah Kinch (previously 'Delightful Deborah' in the Steve Wright Posse on BBC Radio 1, and later at BBC GLR)
- Gary King (later with Atlantic 252 and BBC Radio 1)
- Janice Long (later at BBC Radio 2, then BBC Radio Wales; died in 2021)
- Andy Miller (later with Gem 106)
- Chris Pearson (now with Manx Radio)
- Danny Pietroni (now with Smooth Radio)
- Paul Phear
- John Richards
- Jonathan Ross
- Peter Tait
- Johnnie Walker
- Ruby Wax
- NJ Williams

== Miscellaneous ==
- Although the Superstation was initially based at the radio studios of the British Forces Broadcasting Service in Paddington, London, it later came from Key 103's studios in Manchester.

== See also ==
- BBC Night Network – all evening radio network on BBC Local Radio stations in Northern England
- Night Network – night time service by ITV network
