= Simon Ross =

British radio personality

- Born: 17 January 1967 (age 59); Armagh, Northern Ireland
- Occupation: Broadcaster
- Years active: 1991-present
- Employer: Bauer Media Audio UK
- Website: rossieonline.co.uk

Simon "Rossie" Ross (born 17 January 1967) is a British radio presenter. He has hosted the breakfast show on Greatest Hits Radio since its launch in 2019. He previously presented the Radio City breakfast show until May 2014.

== Early years ==
Ross grew up in Armagh and attended St Patricks Grammar School, Armagh Technical College and The College of Business Studies, Belfast. He is a chef by trade, but started out as a DJ in Northern Ireland clubs, bars and discos while studying at college.

He gave up his career as a chef in 1991 to work for the in-store radio stations for the retailers Topshop and HMV, both of which were based in London.

== Radio career ==
Ross has worked for several radio stations across the United Kingdom. He presented on Rock FM in Preston from 1992, moving to Capital FM in London in 1998 to present the Evening Show. In 2001, he joined Radio Aire in Leeds to host the mid morning show, where he remained for four years. He also occasionally presented on Magic 828 and hosted a Sunday morning show named Radio Aire’s Greatest Hits, playing songs from the 1980s and 1990s.

In 2005, Ross left Aire to join Radio City. He hosted the breakfast show and mid morning shows there for over 10 years, before moving over to Radio City 2 in 2016. The station was rebranded as Greatest Hits Radio in 2019 and Ross has hosted the Breakfast Show since launch, broadcasting across the UK.

== Other work ==
In addition to his radio work, Ross is also a voice-over artist and event host. This includes being the regular host of the "Educate Awards" at Liverpool Cathedral.

He is also the stadium announcer at home matches of Everton F.C., initially between 2005 and 2015, returning to the role in 2024 following the departure of Graeme White, who had the job in between Ross' spells.
