= BBC Radio York =

BBC Local Radio service for North Yorkshire, England

Coordinates: 53.9643°N 1.0848°W

York; England
- Broadcast area: North Yorkshire
- Frequencies: FM: 95.5 MHz (Scarborough and Filey); FM: 103.7 MHz (York, Harrogate, Malton and Pocklington); FM: 104.3 MHz (Ripon, Thirsk and Northallerton); DAB: 10C; Freeview: 712
- RDS: BBC York

Programming
- Language: English
- Format: Local news, talk, music and sport

Ownership
- Owner: BBC Local Radio, BBC Yorkshire

History
- First air date: 4 July 1983
- Former names: BBC North Yorkshire
- Former frequencies: 666 MW; 1260 MW

Technical information
- Licensing authority: Ofcom

Links
- Website: BBC Radio York

BBC Radio York is the BBC's local radio station serving the county of North Yorkshire.

It broadcasts on FM, DAB, digital TV and via BBC Sounds from studios in the Bootham area of York.

According to RAJAR, the station has a weekly audience of 60,000 listeners and a 4.6% share as of December 2023.

== History ==
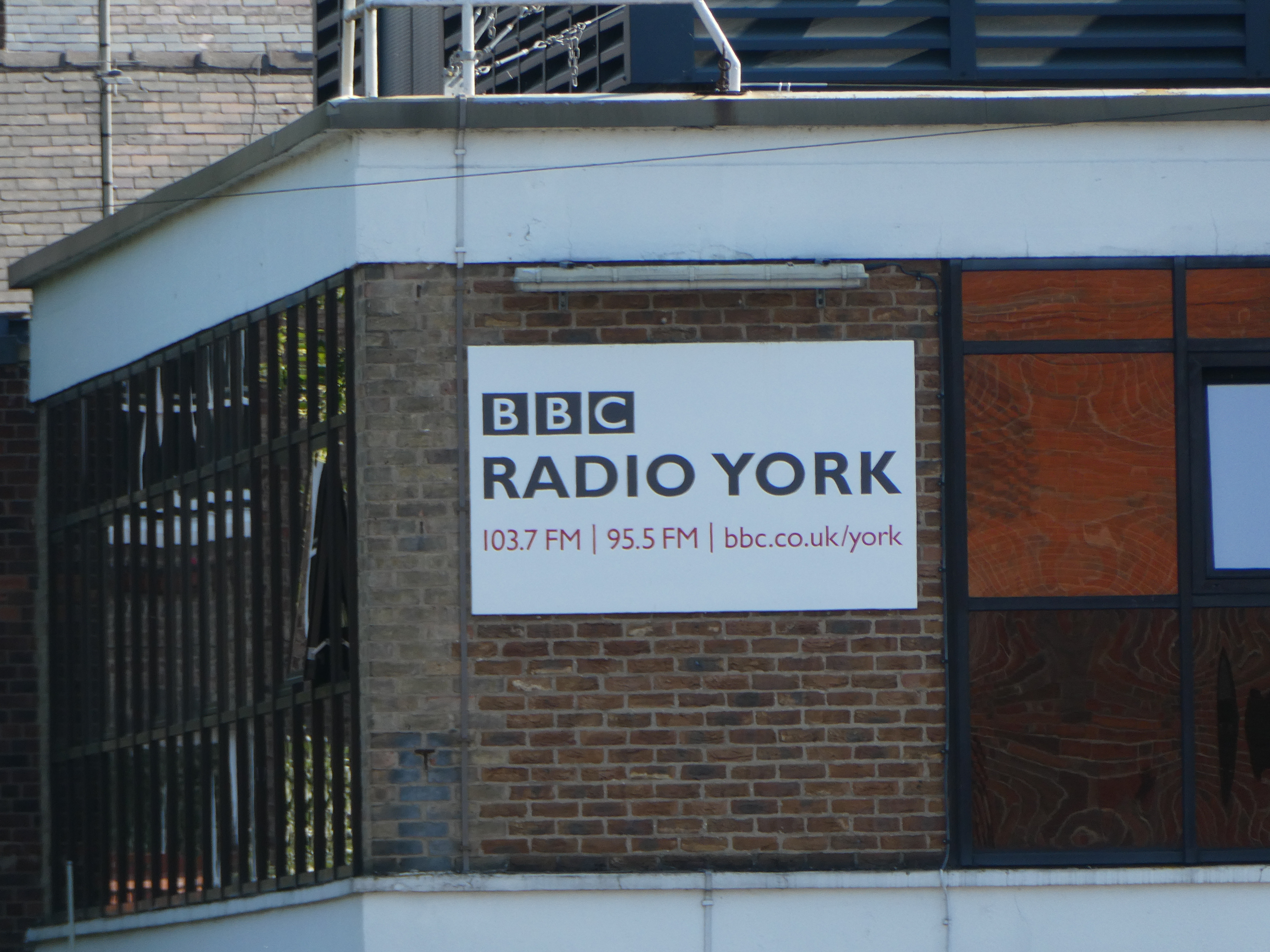
A sign on their studios

BBC Radio York logo 2020–2022

In May 1982, just over a year before the station was due to launch, a temporary service was provided to cover Pope John Paul II's visit to York. The service, which ran for just over 24 hours, operated on what was to be the station's primary medium wave frequency and was also broadcast on the other local stations in the Yorkshire region.

The station launched at 6:30 am on 4 July 1983, and featured on the cover of the Radio Times. John Jefferson was the first station manager with Tony Fish as Programme Organiser. The original team included David Farwig, Derm Tanner, Andy Joynson, David Thomas, Will Hanrahan, Graham Pass, Nik Wood (Scarborough Producer), Diane Myers (Harrogate Producer), Andy Hitchcock, Chris Loveder, Chris Choi, Charlotte Counsel, Shirley Lewis and Sandy Barton.

Initially, the station was only on air for a few hours a day (6:30 am to 1 pm and 4 pm to 6 pm during the week with weekend programming restricted to 8 am until 2 pm) and carried BBC Radio 2 the rest of the time although during the football and rugby league seasons, the station simulcasted BBC Radio Leeds, whose output also featured matches played by the senior North Yorkshire clubs. Later in the decade, the station started to produce its own sports programming as broadcast hours slowly expanded. Weekday afternoon broadcasting was introduced in autumn 1984 and programming also began to start earlier in the day and by the time regional evening programme was introduced by the end of the decade, the station was producing its own programming all day from 6am on weekdays and from 7am at the weekend.

Evening programming on BBC Radio York has always been of a regional nature. The very first was a Saturday evening 45-minute programme consisting of organ music which aired during the winter sports period at 6:45 pm on BBC Radios Leeds, York and Humberside. Then in August 1986 Radio York joined with the other BBC local stations in Yorkshire in broadcasting an early evening service of specialist music programmes. This was expanded on 29 May 1989 with the launch of the BBC Night Network – an all-evening networked service which broadcast nightly on all six Yorkshire and north-east stations from 6.05 pm (6 pm at the weekend) until midnight. In May 1991, local programming was expanded by an hour, until 7 pm. This co-insided with the Night Network's expansion to include the BBC's north-west stations and the following year, Night Network programming was extended on weeknights until 12:30 am, and to 1 am by the end of that decade. Initially, BBC Radio York did not provide any programming for the network but later on, Late Night North with David Dunning often aired from the York studios and in 2002 the BBC's Yorkshire stations, including Radio York, parted from the network to bring back a phone-in with Alex Hall, who had presented a similar show on Pulse. Other programming included Martin Kelner's Late Thing. The Early Show from BBC Radio Humberside (within the BBC Yorkshire and Lincolnshire region) was also carried.

BBC Radio York was not the first radio station broadcasting in York. University Radio York, the oldest independent legal radio station, is the University of York's student radio station and before the BBC, URY was named Radio York. The independent commercial rival, Minster FM, began broadcasting on 4 July 1992. Stray FM, the independent station covering the Harrogate and Ripon areas, made its first transmission exactly two years to the day after Minster's launch and eleven years to the day after Radio York's launch.

== Technical ==
BBC Radio York broadcasts from its studios in York and uses three FM transmitters. The station broadcasts on 95.5 (Oliver's Mount, Scarborough), 103.7 (Acklam Wold transmitter near Leavening, midway between York and Malton) which is for Ryedale and the Vale of York. and 104.3 FM (Woolmoor, near Upsall four miles north of Thirsk close to the A19 – for Ripon, Harrogate, Northallerton and the Yorkshire Dales). In the early days, Radio York's FM frequencies were 90.2 and 97.2.

The station also broadcasts on Freeview TV channel 712 in the BBC Yorkshire and BBC North East and Cumbria regions and streams online via BBC Sounds.

Until 24 February 2020, BBC Radio York was also broadcast on medium wave – 666 (Fulford) and 1260 (Row Brow, Scarborough) AM. The transmitters were closed as a cost-cutting measure.

Listeners in Whitby cannot get signals that broadcast BBC Radio York, and the town is officially served by BBC Radio Tees.

Areas west of Craven such as Settle, Ingleton and Bentham are officially served by BBC Radio Lancashire although editorially, news for those areas is covered by BBC Radio York, but FM and DAB reception is not possible in those areas.

=== DAB licence ===
The DAB licence that BBC Radio York uses covers North Yorkshire from transmitters at Acklam Wold, Oliver's Mount, Harrogate, Hilderbrand, and Bilsdale. The licence was advertised in June 2007 and was awarded to MuxCo in September 2007. It was supposed be ready in June 2009, then revised to December 2009. Finally, the North Yorkshire DAB multiplex launched on 17 December 2014.

=== Equipment ===
Much of BBC York's studio infrastructure was the original Mk3 installation, dating from the station's inception in 1983. This ageing equipment had become unreliable, causing the station to "fall off air" regularly. Because the refurbishment required was significant, it would not be possible to continue to broadcast from the existing premises during the refurbishment, and no suitable alternative premises could be identified. Therefore, plans were drawn up for BBC York to move in with BBC Leeds temporarily and to retain a presence in North Yorkshire through the BBC Bus, and through increased contributions from district studios in Harrogate and Scarborough. BBC York has since completed refurbishment of studio equipment and news room.

== Programming ==
Local programming is produced and broadcast from the BBC's York studios from 6 am to 2 pm each weekday.

The current weekday daytime presenters are Georgey Spanswick from 6 am to 10 am, Joanita Musisi (Jenkinson) from 10 am to 2 pm Monday to Thursday, Bek Homer 10 am to 2 pm on Friday, and Toby Foster's afternoon show is also carried on BBC Radio Leeds and BBC Radio Sheffield.

Off-peak programming, including the national late show (10 pm to 1 am), originates from BBC Radio Manchester and BBC Radio London.

During the station's downtime, BBC Radio York simulcasts overnight programming from BBC Radio 5 Live and BBC Radio London.

=== News, Sport and Weather ===
BBC Radio York provides hourly local news and sport bulletins and weather forecasts every half-hour from 6 am until 6 pm on weekdays. On weekends, local news and weather airs hourly from 7 am until 1 pm.

== Notable former presenters ==
- Former presenters at the station include ITV Sport commentator Jon Champion and Sky Sports commentator Rob Hawthorne and Will Hanrahan, who went on to present Look North and report for Good Morning with Anne and Nick.
- Victor Lewis-Smith started his BBC career here, presenting his chat and music programme, Snooze Button, on Sunday mornings in 1984.
- Countdown host Richard Whiteley made several guest appearances in the early 2000s.
- Sky News anchor Gareth Barlow began his broadcasting career at the station.
- The Grand Tour front-man Richard Hammond was also once a presenter.

== Awards ==
In 2001, BBC Radio York won the Sony Radio Academy Gold Award for Community Service for "Floodwatch News" – its coverage of the floods that hit the county of North Yorkshire in November 2000.

In 2002, BBC Radio York was awarded Silver in the News Programme category for The Great Heck Rail Crash: Countdown To A Tragedy.

In 2011, BBC Radio York's news team won the Gillard award for Original Journalism. The awards are given out each year and are open to the entire BBC local radio network.

In 2012, the flagship breakfast show, Adam Tomlinson at Breakfast, was nominated for a Sony award for Breakfast Show of the Year.

In 2013, presenter Jonathan Cowap won Gold at the annual Frank Gillard Awards for Best Hotseat interview.

In 2014, the station won the Gillard Gold Award for Faith-based programming.

In 2016, Georgey at Breakfast won Best Breakfast Show at the Local Radio Awards.
