= Kirsten O'Brien =

British television presenter and actress

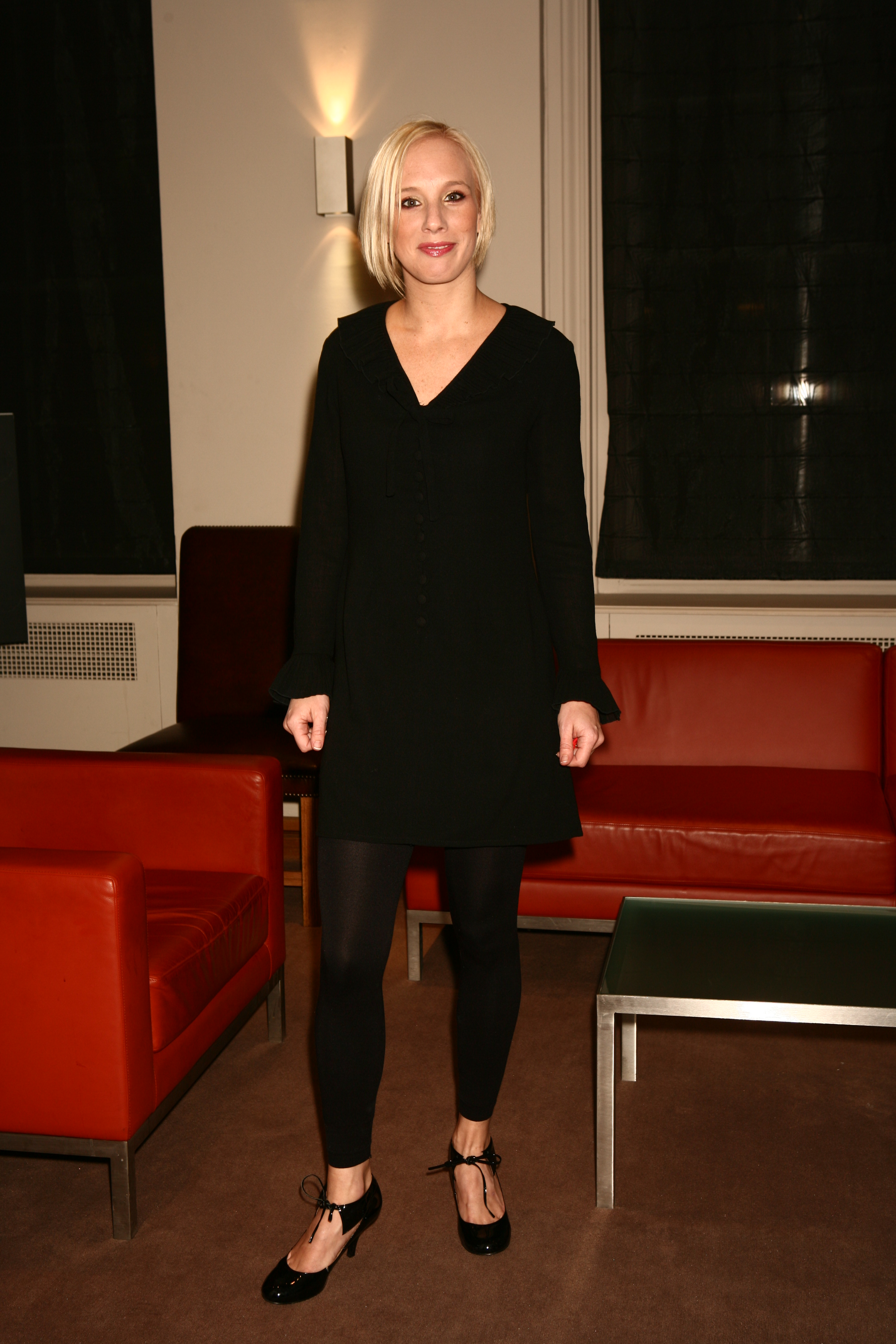
- O'Brien in 2007
- Born: Kirsten Lindsey O'Brien; 23 February 1972 (age 54); Nunthorpe, Middlesbrough, England
- Occupations: Presenter, actress
- Years active: 1995–present
- Known for: Presenting SMart (1999–2009), and SMarteenies (2002). Mid-morning presenter on BBC Radio Berkshire (until 2026). Current travel and traffic presenter for BBC Radio 2
- Spouse: Mark Drake (m. 2010)
- Children: 3

Kirsten Lindsey O'Brien (born 23 February 1972) is an English television, radio presenter and actress. She is best known for her work presenting for the BBC, including the CBBC art programme SMart from 1999 to 2009, the CBeebies pre-school art spin-off programme SMarteenies in 2002 and as a radio presenter for BBC Radio Berkshire's mid-morning programme, and previously, the Breakfast Show. Since May 2026, O'Brien is a traffic and travel presenter for BBC Radio 2.

== Career ==
O'Brien studied media and communications at the University of Central England in Birmingham, graduating in 1993. She got her first broadcast experience on the university's student radio station which led to her first job in 1995 at Tyne Tees Television where she made her presenting debut on a children's science programme.

In 1996 she joined the team presenting the continuity links during the BBC's children's programming CBBC. She stayed there for three-and-a-half years during which time she became best known for her partnership with puppet Otis the Aardvark. Both O'Brien and Otis also co-presented with other people (and often solo). The 1997 Saturday morning spin-off Saturday Aardvark was entirely built around them. Puppeteer Dave Chapman would often reduce O'Brien to tears of helpless laughter with his ad-libs.

O'Brien left the CBBC on-air presentation team in 1999 but remained a regular on children's TV and radio. She co-hosted SMart and its spin-offs SMart on the Road and SMarteenies (for the pre-school CBeebies channel). On radio she was one of the presenters of BBC 7's Little Toe Radio Show. In 2004 she played Peter Pan in pantomime. The same year O'Brien successfully took part in a lumberjack competition for the BBC series Bring It On. She performed a sketch show during the Edinburgh Fringe in August 2006 entitled Lesley's Lunch Hour – Not During Lunch, And Not Quite An Hour along with double act partner Ruth Bratt. In 2007 she took her comedy show Kirsten O'Brien – Confessions of a Children's TV Presenter to Edinburgh.

Between 28 May and 15 June 2007, she co-presented Springwatch Trackers alongside Steve Backshall. Transmitted live on BBC Two from a farm in Devon and repeated later in the day on the CBBC Channel the show featured teams of boys and girls who were set a series of Tracker challenges.

She has been a guest on Stephen Merchant's on BBC Radio 6 Music, Through the Keyhole and several times on Rob Brydon's Annually Retentive.

O'Brien filmed Kirsten's Topless Ambition, a documentary for BBC3 that aired on 28 April 2009, in which she was "facing a huge decision – whether to do what many other female presenters had done before her and take her clothes off for a lads' mag to try to clinch bigger, better presenting jobs and a more adult audience." Ultimately she only received one offer and opted against doing this and decided to perform more stand-up comedy. She also stated on the show that she had been ready to leave SMart since co-presenter Mark Speight's death and felt it was not right to stay. O'Brien then stayed with CBBC to take over as host of game show Gimme a Break.

From 2009 to 2010, she made appearances on the morning show GMTV presenting on-location. On 19 February 2010 she and George Lamb presented EastEnders: The Aftermath where they interviewed members of the cast about the live 25th anniversary episode. She took part in a celebrity version of TV show Total Wipeout, which aired on 2 January 2010.

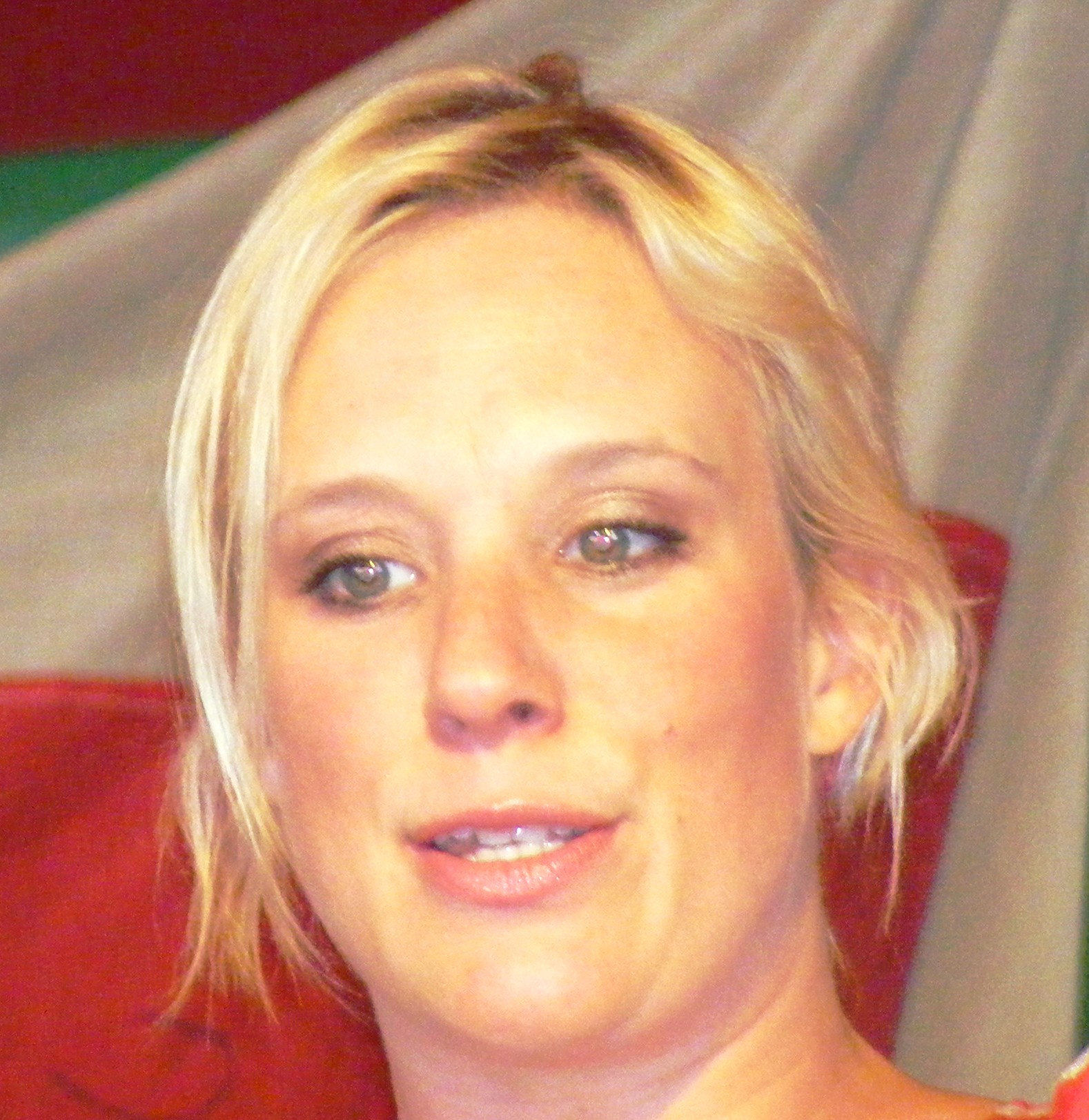
Appearing in the Kidz Field Big Top at the 2010 Glastonbury Festival

In 2010 O'Brien, along with actor and friend Will Mellor, appeared in The World's Toughest Driving Tests, a driving challenge. They travelled the world mastering the biggest and hardest-to-drive vehicles to find out who is the better driver. In the first episode, which aired in February 2010, O'Brien won when she defeated Mellor driving a Romanian TR-85 combat tank. She went on to take wins in the third and sixth episode. Three wins, together with a draw in the fifth episode meant that O'Brien was the overall winner of the series.

On 31 December 2010, she appeared on BBC1's Celebrity Mastermind answering questions on Reeves and Mortimer (scoring 13) & 24 overall with 1 pass, coming third. She donated her fee to Teesside Hospice. On 9 January 2011, she was spotted at the V&A Museum of Childhood during filming of a secret new TV series. On 26 March 2011, she was a compere for one of the Teenage Cancer Trust shows at the Royal Albert Hall at which Editors headlined. On 3 March 2012, she appeared on BBC 1 Let's Dance for Sport Relief. She danced to Van Halen's "Jump". This was followed by an appearance on Big Brother's Bit on the Side in June 2012.

O'Brien was announced on 12 June 2013 as the co-presenter of Heart Wiltshire's Breakfast programme alongside Ben Atkinson.

In 2019 she became a presenter and newsreader for Andrew Peach's Breakfast Show on BBC Radio Berkshire. In 2023 O'Brien became the main presenter of the station's Breakfast Show. In 2024, she became the presenter of the weekday mid-morning show from 10–2pm. On 2 May 2026, O'Brien revealed she was leaving BBC Radio Berkshire to become a traffic and travel presenter for BBC Radio 2. Her former CBBC co-presenters Dick & Dom surprised her on air in the studio on her last Berkshire show.

She won Celebrity Mastermind in January 2025 and had further television appearances in the same year on Pointless Celebrities and Richard Osman's House of Games on the BBC.

== Filmography ==
=== Television ===
Year	Title	Role	Notes
1996–1999	CBBC	Presenter	
1998	Get Your Own Back	Herself	Guest presenter for Christmas special
1999–2009	SMart	Herself	
2002–2003	SMarteenies	Herself	
2004	Bring it On	Herself	1 episode
2005–2007	Smile	Herself	
2007	Springwatch Trackers	Herself	
2007	The Fanbanta Football Show	Herself	
2007	Totally Doctor Who	Herself	
2008–2009	Help! Teach is Coming to Stay	Herself	
2008	Thank God You're Here	Herself	
2009	Kirsten's Topless Ambition	Herself	Documentary for BBC Three
2009	Britain's Most Embarrassing Parents	Herself	Documentary for BBC Three
2009	Gimme a Break	Herself	Replaced by Joe Swash for 2011 series
2002–2011	Big Toe Books	Herself	
2009	We Need Answers	Herself	
2009	Total Wipeout	Herself	Celebrity special
2009–2010	GMTV	Herself	
2010	The World's Toughest Driving Tests	Herself	Won Series (4–3)
2010	The King is Dead	Herself	
2012	Let's Dance for Sport Relief	Contestant	
2019	The One Show	Reporter	
2023, 2024	Richard Osman's House of Games	Contestant	
2025	Celebrity Mastermind	Contestant	
2025	Pointless Celebrities	Contestant	

=== Theatre ===
Year	Title	Role	Theatre	Notes
2005	Peter Pan	Peter Pan	Ipswich Regent Theatre	

== Personal life ==
O'Brien plays tennis, and has taken part in swimming, abseiling and netball events for charity. She has asthma and is a keen Middlesbrough F.C. fan; she has been involved in charity work with the club, including the Premier League's Creating Chances programme. She is married to Mark Drake. On 15 December 2011, O'Brien gave birth to their son, Fox Michael Drake. In September 2017 O'Brien tweeted that she had given birth to twins, Indy and Kit.
