= Alex Hall (actress) =

British actress and radio presenter (born 1949)

- Born: Patricia Anne Thompson; 17 July 1949 (age 76); Nuneaton, Warwickshire, England
- Other name: Patricia Anne Fisher
- Children: 2

Alex Hall (born Patricia Anne Thompson now Fisher, 17 July 1949) is a British actress and radio presenter.

== Early life ==
Her father was a semi-professional footballer for Nuneaton Borough FC. She lived in Peterlee from the age of 3 until 10, then in Billingham both on Stockton Street and York Crescent, when her father worked for ICI. She attended St John the Evangelist Primary and St Joseph's Convent grammar school in Hartlepool. She worked in the advertising sales department of the Northern Echo and the Evening Gazette.

== Television career ==
Hall appeared in ITV's Emmerdale as Jean Strickland, the headteacher of Hotten Comprehensive, sporadically between 1999 and 2001. Her character was killed-off in a hit and run involving a number of her students. Hall had previously appeared in many well-known TV shows including Coronation Street, Prime Suspect, Spender, Byker Grove and Harry.

Since Emmerdale, television roles have included Wendy Frost in Bodies with Max Beesley and Keith Allen, along with playing Brenda, the dizzy Little Chef waitress in Max and Paddy's Road to Nowhere. Hall has also appeared in the BBC One children's drama Clay and a 2010 episode of Waterloo Road.

== Radio career ==
Hall started out on the late-night phone-in on TFM in Thornaby-on-Tees. In 1990, she joined the original line up of Magic 828 where she presented the late show.

Hall later moved to Bradford's The Pulse where she hosted a late-night phone in. It was featured in an episode of ITV's Network First titled Midnight Callers.

In April 2000, she crossed over to BBC Radio York, then to BBC Radio Leeds by 2003, hosting The Alex Hall Late Show on the BBC Night Network every weeknight between 10pm and 1am, from January 2002 until May 2006. She returned to cover Russell Walker on the Late Night Show in July 2015 for a few weeks.

Hall has been at BBC Radio Tees since 2006. She first hosted a mid-morning show from 10am until 1pm. By September 2008 her mid-morning phone-in show was replaced by a show presented by Diane Youdale of Gladiators fame, and her co-host Neil Green. In 2009 Hall hosted a weekly show on Sunday's between 5pm and 7pm titled Songs from the Shows. Songs from the Shows has been simulcast on BBC Radio Newcastle from 6 January 2013 until the show ended in 2023 due to cuts made to local radio by the BBC.

Hall was also a columnist for the Telegraph & Argus.

== Personal life ==
Hall has a daughter named Holly, and a son named Nick, who excelled in hockey and rugby respectively.
