= Nigel Williams (broadcaster) =

British broadcaster

Nigel Williams, sometimes known as NJ Williams, is a British broadcaster and voice-over artist.

== Biography ==
Williams studied Electronic and Electrical Engineering at the University of Surrey where he became involved in the campus radio station as well as a broadcaster at Hospital Radio Wexham (Slough). In 1983, he began his professional radio career at County Sound in Guildford.

Later, he presented programmes for Radio City, Chiltern Radio, The Superstation, Virgin Radio, Magic 105.4, Heart 106.2, BBC Surrey and Smooth Radio.

At Heart 106.2, Williams presented Late Night Love Songs. The show featured true relationship stories sent in by listeners (Love Letters). Late Night Love Songs became the first show on the station to overtake Capital Radio as the market leader in London. A book of the best stories on Late Night Love Songs was published called 'Love Letters Straight from the Heart.'

In recent years, Williams has been a mainstay of Jazz FM's daytime schedule and is currently the station's breakfast presenter.

As a voice-over artist, Williams has been heard on commercials for companies including McDonald's, PC World, Shreddies, Cheerios and Lloyds TSB. He was the image voice for LWT and ITV from 1990 to 2004. He has been heard on LBC 97.3, LBC News 1152 and the Heart Network of radio stations. His voice has been used as the image voice of LBC, BBC Northampton, Compass FM, Ridings FM and Rutland Radio. He continues to work as a voice-over talent from his own studios in London. Recent work includes Cadbury, training programmes for The United Nations and a controversial ad for the infidelity website Ashley Madison, featured on the Howard Stern radio show.

In 2020, Williams was nominated for Best Music Presenter at the Radio Academy ARIAS.
