= Steve Bunce =

British freelance multimedia sport pundit (born 1962)

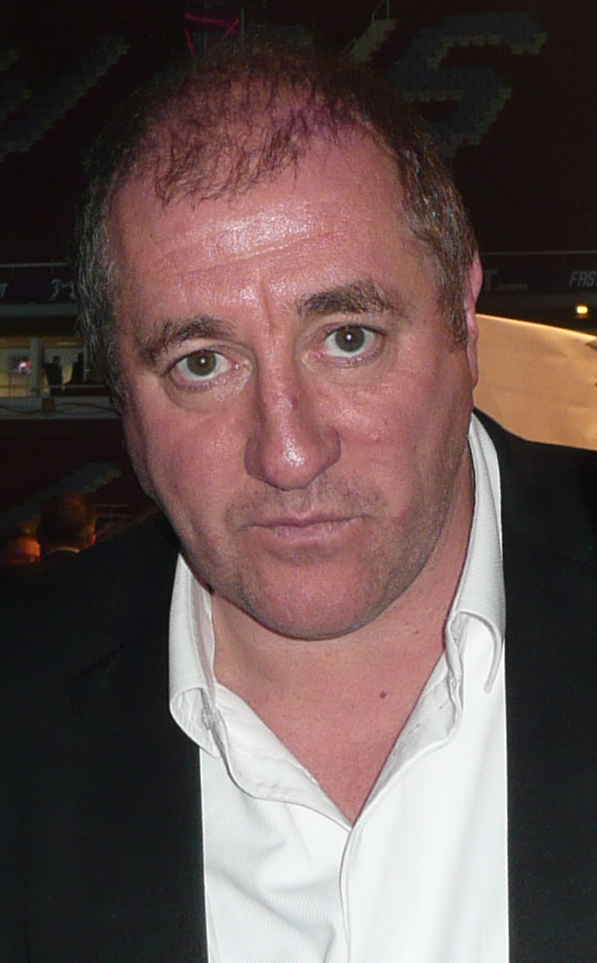
Bunce in 2010

Steve Bunce, nicknamed "Buncey", is a British freelance television and radio sport pundit and newspaper columnist.

== Career ==
He has regularly appeared as a pundit on the BBC sports programme Inside Sport and on BBC Radio 5 Live's Fighting Talk. Bunce was a boxing pundit on Setanta Sports and headlined his own show, Steve Bunce's Boxing Hour, until June 2009 when the organisation ceased broadcasting in Britain. Despite calls for the popular boxing show to reappear, it did not return until the introduction of Britain's first dedicated boxing channel BoxNation. Bunce's Boxing Hour started broadcasting on BoxNation on 17 October 2011.

He has a regular column in the magazine Boxing Monthly.

In 2010, he published his debut work of fiction The Fixer.

He currently presents the ESPN UK version of the American sports talk show Pardon the Interruption.

Bunce regularly appears on BBC Radio 5 Live's Fighting Talk and the Steve Bunce Boxing Show on BBC Radio London. Bunce won the FT Champion of Champions final on 19 May 2012, defeating Martin Kelner, Dougie Anderson, and Greg Brady in the process.

== Bibliography ==
=== Non-fiction ===
- Boxing Greats (Bramley, 1998) ISBN 9781858338569
- Michael Watson's Story: The Biggest Fight (with Michael Watson, Little, Brown Book Group, 2004) ISBN 9780316725644
- Bunce's Big Fat Short History of British Boxing (Transworld, 2017), ISBN 9781473543218
- Around the World in 80 Fights: A Lifetime’s Journey to the Heart of Boxing (Headline, 2024) ISBN 9781035413997

=== Novels ===
- The Fixer (Mainstream Publishing, 2011) ISBN 9781907195839

Preceded by Tom Watt	BBC Radio 5 Live; Fighting Talk Champion of Champions; 2011/12	Succeeded by Martin Kelner
