= The Fanbanta Football Show =

2007 football TV show on Channel 4

The Fanbanta Football Show is an association football related television show that aired on Channel 4 on Wednesdays at 24:00 in 2007. The show was created by the company of the same name, Fanbanta. Hosted by Joe Mace and Kirsten O'Brien, the show garnered a generally negative reaction during its brief run.
