= Country Music Radio =

- Broadcast area: Europe
- Frequency: Astra 19.2°E satellite

Programming
- Format: Country

Ownership
- Owner: unknown

History
- First air date: May 1993
- Last air date: 1996

Country Music Radio (CMR) was a radio station broadcast throughout Europe during the 1990s via satellite.

== History ==
Originally called QCMR (an acronym for Quality Country Music Radio) and based in the studios of sister station QEFM in Camberley, the station renamed and relocated to studios in Alton, Hampshire, UK in 1994 and then to Britannia Row, Islington, London, UK in 1995.

While the station ceased full-time broadcasting by satellite in 1996, it has continued its existence using other methods of distribution including internet streaming and part-time relays via other broadcasters. CMR Hot and CMR Nashville are currently broadcasting on the internet and Lee Williams is still the owner of the franchise.

As of 1996, CMR was broadcast in the Netherlands via CMT Europe (Astra), which was only available to listeners with access to local cable services or a dish antenna.
