= Peter Hutton (media executive) =

Media executive and sports journalist

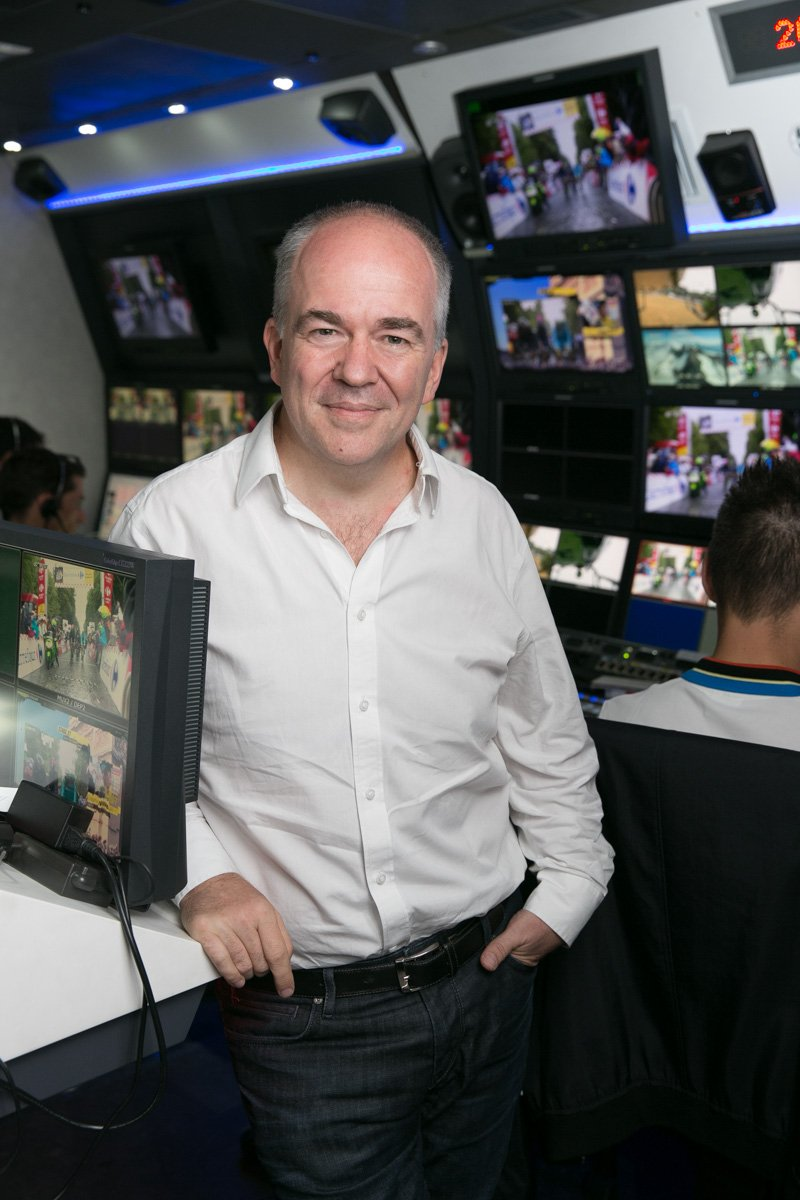
- Born: 1966 (age 59–60)
- Other name: Peter Matthew Hutton
- Occupation: Media executive
- Years active: 35
- Known for: Sports Media CEO roles in Europe and Asia, Sports commentator from age of 16

Peter Matthew Hutton (born 1966) is a multiple board member working in the sports industry. Among his current roles are board responsibilities at Wembley stadium, the Saudi Professional (soccer) league, the Professional Triathlon Organisation, HYPE and the Rugby League as well as consultancy agreements with Greenfly, YBVR and other sport related organisations.

He was earlier the Head of Sports at Meta overseeing the company’s relationship with the sports industry for Facebook, Instagram, WhatsApp, Messenger, Portal and Oculus, as well as having responsibility for partnerships with the media industry across the world.

He was previously CEO of pan European broadcaster Eurosport, having rejoined the company in 2015 following the acquisition of Eurosport by Discovery Communications.

== 20th century ==
Hutton originally worked for Eurosport as a commentator in 1990 during his time as a sports reporter and TV presenter with Sky Sports, BSB, Anglia TV and BBC Leeds. His media career had begun as a 16-year-old schoolboy working for BBC Radio Leeds under then sports editor Harry Gration. At 21, on graduation from Cambridge University, he became sports editor of Radio Aire in Leeds before joining BBC TV a year later, where he reported from the Hillsborough Football Disaster in a year as a Leeds-based journalist. He moved to London to join the start-up 'the Sports Channel' which became Sky Sports

In 1993 Hutton left Sky Sports to start a new world football television programme 'Futbol Mundial', reporting on football stories from around the world on a programme distributed worldwide.

In 1994, he moved to India as the first employee of the International Management Group (IMG) in the country, setting up its television arm TWI, which produced cricket, football and Bollywood music events as it became the biggest independent production company in the country. Hutton went on to become head of Production for IMG Asia as well as the co-managing director of IMG South Asia.

== 21st century ==
In 2002, he became one of the launch team of Ten Sports, a sports channel aimed at the Indian sub-continent but based in Dubai, UAE. He was CEO when the company was eventually sold to Zee Television in 2010.

In 2011 he joined Fox International Channels, running international sports activities and was involved in the acquisition of Setanta Sports Africa and ESPN/Star Sports in Asia.

He was the managing director of the Asian channel when it was rebranded as Fox Sports in Asia and Star Sports in India in 2013.

In 2014 Hutton became CEO of the Mp and Silva sports agency in London before joining Eurosport in 2015.

In 2015, he was named sports executive of the year, won deal of the year for the acquisition of European territory Olympic rights and Eurosport was named sports channel of the year at the TV Sports Awards. They held onto the award for 2016, when they also won deal of the year for the acquisition of Bundesliga football rights in Germany.

In 2017, he was named in the Cablefax 100 as one of the top 100 executives worldwide in the TV industry.

In 2017, he was again nominated for sports executive of the year, with Eurosport nominated for four separate awards at the TV Sports Awards, the most nominations for any firm worldwide, winning two out of four including deal of the year for the third consecutive year.

He was also named in Sports Business's list of sports executives of the year

He was profiled in the industry magazine Sportcal.

In December 2021, Hutton joined the board of directors of the Professional Triathletes Organisation.

In February 2022, Hutton joined Eleven Sports as a non-executive director. The company was sold to DAZN in 2023.

Hutton was one of the 4 man committee that successfully recommended changing the format of modern pentathlon to ensure olympic survival, replacing equestrianism with an obstacle course based on the TV show ‘Ninja Warrior’.

In 2024, he chaired the cricket World cup t20 organising committee as the event came to the US for the first time

He lives in Paris, London and Palo Alto.
