= Frank Gillard =

British journalist (1908–1998)

Frank Gillard CBE
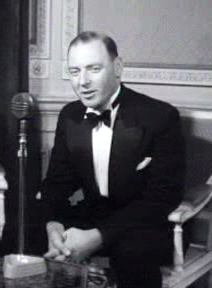
- Gillard speaking in the Netherlands in 1946
- Born: Francis George Gillard; 1 December 1908; Tiverton, Devon, United Kingdom
- Died: 20 October 1998 (aged 89)
- Education: Wellington School, Somerset; St Luke's College, Exeter
- Years active: 1936–1998
- Employer: BBC
- Known for: BBC Director of Radio, war correspondent
- Title: Director of Radio
- Predecessor: None
- Successor: Ian Trethowan

Short interview with Frank Gillard during a conference in the Netherlands with Radio Oranje in 1946

Francis George Gillard CBE (1 December 1908 – 20 October 1998) was a BBC executive, reporter and radio innovator.

== Early years ==
Gillard was born in Tiverton in Devon and attended Wellington School, Somerset. He gained a bachelor's degree from St Luke's College, Exeter (now part of the University of Exeter). He then taught in a private school.

== Broadcaster ==
In 1936 he became a part-time broadcaster and in 1941 joined the BBC full-time. He became a war correspondent attached to Southern Command and witnessed the Dieppe Raid. In 1942 he went to North Africa to report on the campaign of the Eighth Army under Montgomery. He then reported on the Sicilian and Italian campaigns before returning to the UK ready for the D-day landings. He made memorable reports, often under fire, throughout this period, including eyewitness accounts of the Battle for Caen.

When Howard Marshall, the Director of the War Reporting Unit, was recalled Gillard took his place. He followed the campaign to the end reporting on the meeting of US and Soviet troops in 1945.

== Radio administrator ==
From 1945 to 1963 Gillard worked in the BBC's western region, becoming its director in 1955. In 1964 he was made Director of Radio with a seat on the BBC's Board of Management. He saw the need to fill the gap left by the demise of pirate radio for 'pop' music. To do this he reorganised the BBC's radio into four stations, Radios 1, 2, 3 & 4. He also discontinued Children's Hour and shut the BBC's Features Department. In 1967 he also created the first local radio stations. Gillard retired in 1969.

== Retirement and honours ==
Gillard remained active throughout his retirement helping both Australian and American public service broadcasters. He was one of several people whose input led to the creation of Masterpiece Theatre.

He also initiated a living history project to capture a record of the earliest days of the BBC.

The BBC named their local radio awards the Frank Gillard Awards. He was awarded an OBE in 1946. and a CBE in 1961.
