= Radio Aire =

- Final logo used from 2015-2020.
- Leeds; United Kingdom
- Broadcast area: Leeds and West Yorkshire
- Frequencies: FM: 96.3 MHz; DAB: 12D
- RDS: AIRE
- Branding: Across West Yorkshire

Ownership
- Owner: Bauer

History
- First air date: 1 September 1981
- Last air date: 31 August 2020

Radio Aire was an Independent Local Radio station, serving Leeds and West Yorkshire.

The station was merged and relaunched as Greatest Hits Radio West Yorkshire, as part of a rebrand, on 1 September 2020.

== History ==
Radio Aire's original logo

Radio Aire logo used from 2008 to 2015.

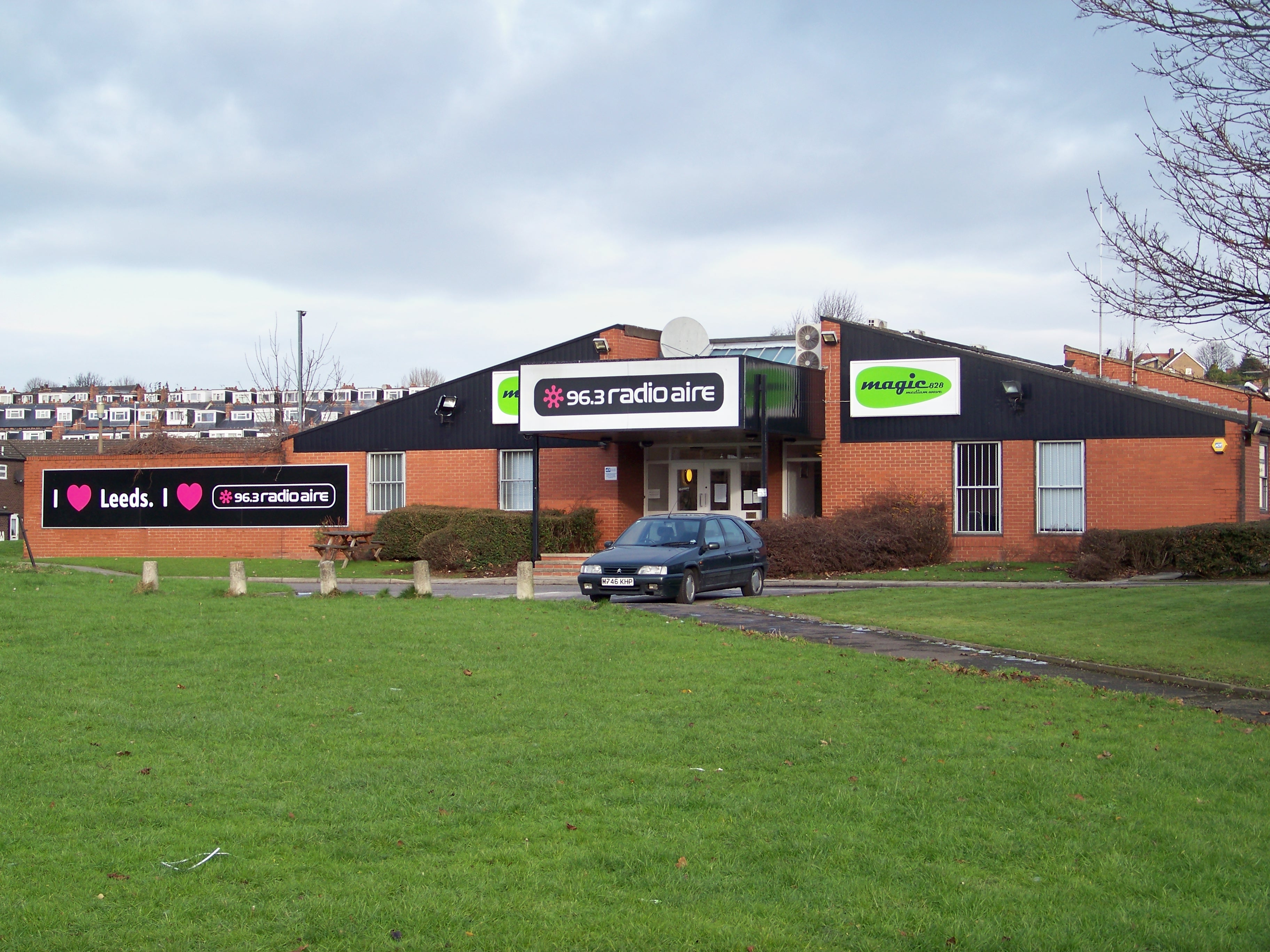
Radio Aire's studios, shared with Greatest Hits West Yorkshire in Burley, Leeds

Radio Aire was launched at 6am on 1 September 1981 by breakfast presenter Graham Thornton – the first song played on air was Pilot of the Airwaves by Charlie Dore. The station's first news bulletin was read by Christa Ackroyd and in November 1982, she became the UK's first female radio news editor.

The station originally broadcast on 362m Medium Wave (828 kHz AM) and 94.6 VHF. In 1986, Radio Aire's VHF/FM frequency changed to 96.3 FM.

Radio Aire's studios were based on Burley Road, overlooking Kirkstall Road, next to Yorkshire Television's headquarters – it was one of the first Independent Local Radio stations to have purpose-built studios. In the late 1980s, the studios were used for The James Whale Radio Show, which was a late night TV show, broadcast on ITV, Radio Aire and Red Rose Radio.

On 17 July 1990, Radio Aire split frequencies, forming Aire FM and Magic 828. In 1992, the name was changed to Radio Aire FM and to 96.3 Aire FM in 1995. A change of format in 1996 saw another station name change to The New 96.3 Aire FM before The New was dropped in 1998. By March 2001, Radio Aire had reverted to its original name.

The station together with Magic 828 was bought by EMAP in 1995 and it became part of their Big City Network of stations. It maintained a generic branding with sister stations across Northern England from 1999. Following the acquisition of EMAP Radio in 2008, the station was owned and operated by Bauer Radio as part of its 'Big City Network' (later known as 'Bauer City 1', and latterly, the Hits Radio Network).

By the time of the station's closure, most of Radio Aire's output consisted of networked programming – with local output reduced to a four-hour breakfast show on weekdays, alongside hourly local news bulletins, peak-time traffic updates and advertising.

== Closure ==
On 16 July 2020, it was announced that Radio Aire would switch brands from Hits Radio to Greatest Hits Radio, as part of a wider overhaul.

Radio Aire ceased broadcasting at 4pm on Monday 31 August 2020. The last on-air presenter was Hattie Pearson and the last song played was "Uptown Funk" by Mark Ronson featuring Bruno Mars.

On 1 September 2020, the station rebranded as Greatest Hits Radio West Yorkshire and merged with several stations in Yorkshire and Lincolnshire with all local programming removed apart from a regional afternoon show for Yorkshire, hosted by Steve Priestley from the Leeds studios but this ended in November 2024.

Radio Aire's DAB slot on the Leeds multiplex was taken over by neighbouring station Pulse 1, which carried a local breakfast show for West Yorkshire on weekdays, followed by networked programmes from the Hits Radio Network in Manchester. In March 2021, Pulse 1 closed its Bradford studios and moved to the former Radio Aire studios in Leeds.

In April 2024, Pulse 1 changed its name to Hits Radio West Yorkshire, although the local breakfast show was retained until 6 June 2025, marking the end of local programming from Bauer's stations in West Yorkshire.

Localised news bulletins and advertising for West Yorkshire continue to be broadcast on Hits Radio and Greatest Hits Radio, whilst traffic bulletins for the area are broadcast during weekday breakfast and drivetime shows.

== Transmitter information ==
Radio Aire's FM transmitter was located at the Tingley site in Morley, close to the A653 and junction 28 of the M62. The adjacent mast, known as Morley, is the former home of the station's FM transmissions. It continues to broadcast Greatest Hits Radio West Yorkshire on 96.3 MHz and the Leeds DAB multiplex.

The medium wave frequency of 828 kHz continued to carry Greatest Hits Radio until it ceased broadcasting on Friday 30 April 2021.

== Notable presenters ==
- Christa Ackroyd
- Bruno Brookes (now at 45 Radio)
- Paddy Bunce
- Mark Easton
- Paul Fairburn
- Stephanie Hirst (now at Hits Radio)
- Lucy Horobin (later at Heart Dance)
- Peter Matthew Hutton
- Martin Kelner (now at talkRADIO)
- Andy Kershaw (deceased)
- Liz Kershaw
- Jason King (now at Heart London)
- Alex Lester (now at Greatest Hits Radio)
- Peter Levy
- Simon Logan
- Mark Mardell
- Chris Moyles (now at Radio X)
- Bob Preedy (now at Shoreline FM)
- Steve Priestley (now at Greatest Hits Radio Yorkshire)
- Phil Riley
- Joel Ross (now at Rock FM)
- Simon Ross (now at Greatest Hits Radio)
- Peter Tait (deceased)
- Carol Vorderman
- Paul Welsh
- James Whale (deceased)
- Tony Wrighton
