= Help! Teach Is Coming to Stay =

- Presented by: Kirsten O'Brien; Johny Pitts
- Narrated by: Kirsten O'Brien; Johny Pitts
- Country of origin: United Kingdom
- No. of episodes: 20

Production
- Executive producer: Karen Woodward
- Editor: Marcus Leathly
- Running time: 1 hour

Original release
- Network: BBC Two (2008); CBBC (2009)
- Release: 19 July 2008 – 29 March 2009

Help! Teach Is Coming to Stay is a CBBC show that premiered on Saturday 19 July 2008, as part of the summer line up.

== The show ==
In this show a teacher stays with one of their pupils for a weekend, during which time they have to learn everything about two of the child's hobbies. On Monday when the class is back at school the teacher has to sit an exam about their weekend.

=== Weekend lessons ===
During the weekend the pupils have to teach their teacher about two of their favourite hobbies. On the Friday evening they undertake a "compatibility test" to see how well they work as a team, with the teacher having to be guided through an activity such as making a clay model or collecting objects from the garden while blindfolded, legs tied together or similar. If they fail to pass this challenge they are both forced to eat cold school food.

On Saturday morning the pupil gives a 45 theory lesson on one of the hobbies. This is followed by a 15-minute break in which they attempt to gain an extra 15 minutes for the next lesson.

=== Final exam ===
The final exam is shown in front of their class. The way in which the exam passes or fails is with a judge who is specialist in the subject the teacher is being tested on. If the teacher gets three ticks then they pass and a grand prize for the class, however if they don't they will fail consequently making the kid (teacher) and the teacher (pupil) gunged as the forfeit.

== Presenters ==
- Kirsten O'Brien (2008–2009)
- Johny Pitts (2008–2009)

== Series Guide ==
| Series | Editions | Start date | Finish Date |
|---|---|---|---|
| Series 1 | 20 | 19 July 2008 | 29 March 2009 |
