= Voice of Peace =

Offshore radio station in the Middle East

Voice of Peace Kol HaShalom (קול השלום)
- Broadcast area: East of the Mediterranean Sea
- Frequencies: 1539 kHz AM (although it would announce it as 1540 kHz) (1973-1993); 100.0 MHz FM (1980-1993)

Programming
- Format: Pop / Variety

Ownership
- Owner: Abie Nathan

History
- First air date: 19 May 1973
- Last air date: November 1993

Voice of Peace
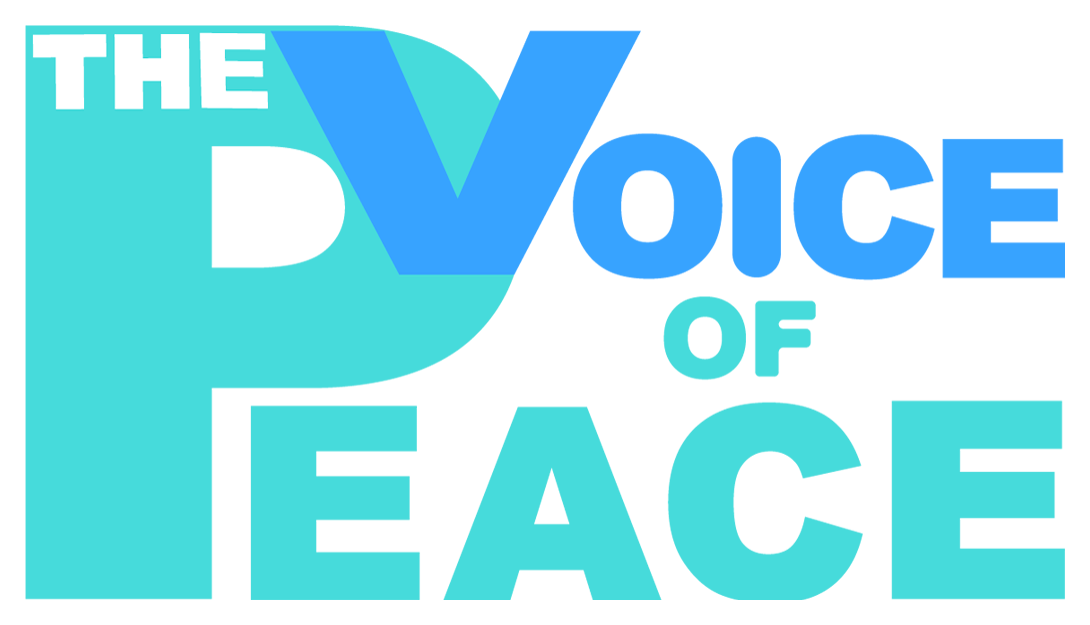
- Broadcast area: Online streaming from Tel Aviv, Israel

Programming
- Format: Pop / Variety / Oldies

History
- First air date: 7 November 2009–present 2014–present – The Voice of Peace Classics (2nd channel)

Links
- Website: http://www.thevoiceofpeace.co.il/

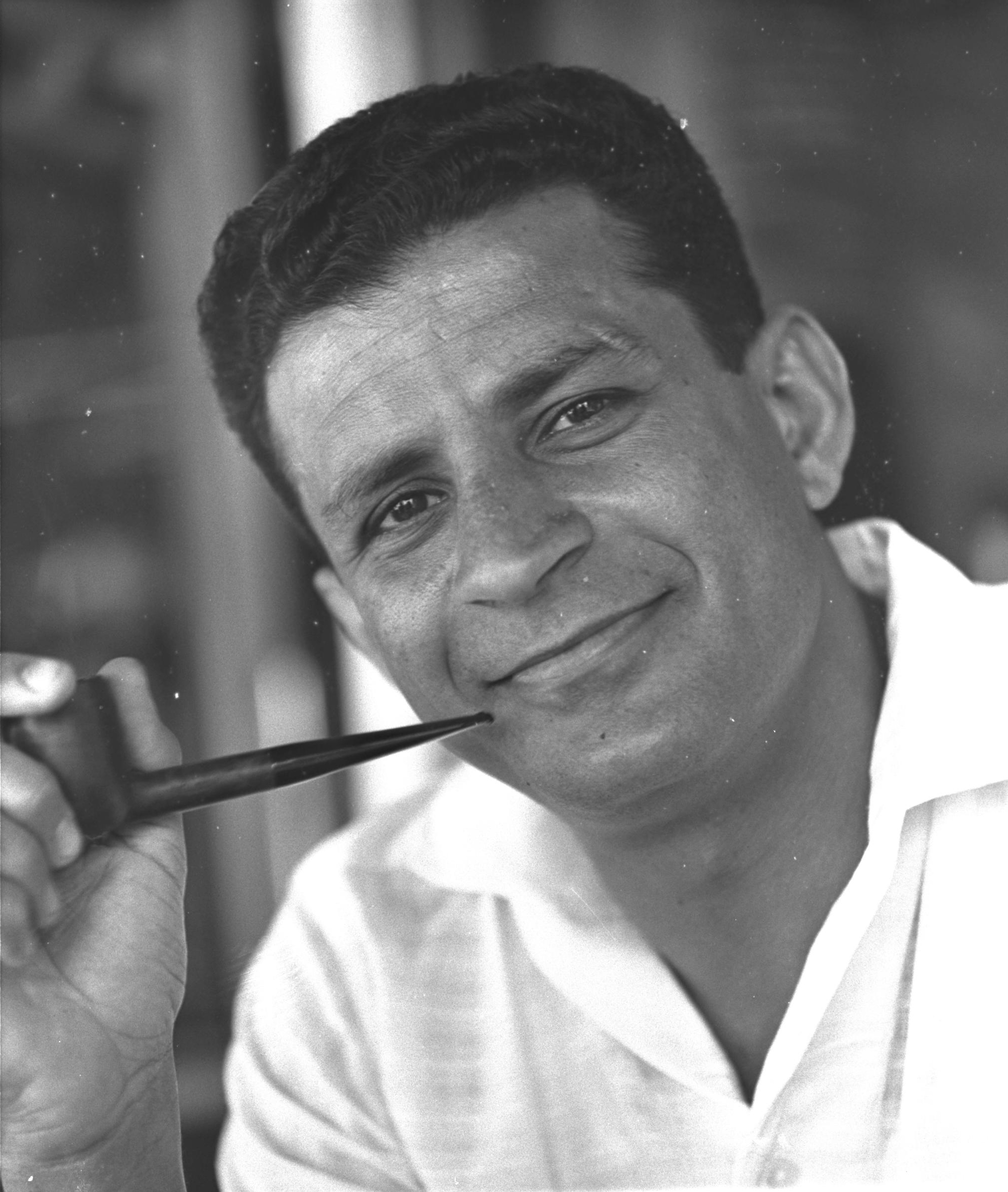
Abie Nathan, founder of the radio station Voice of Peace

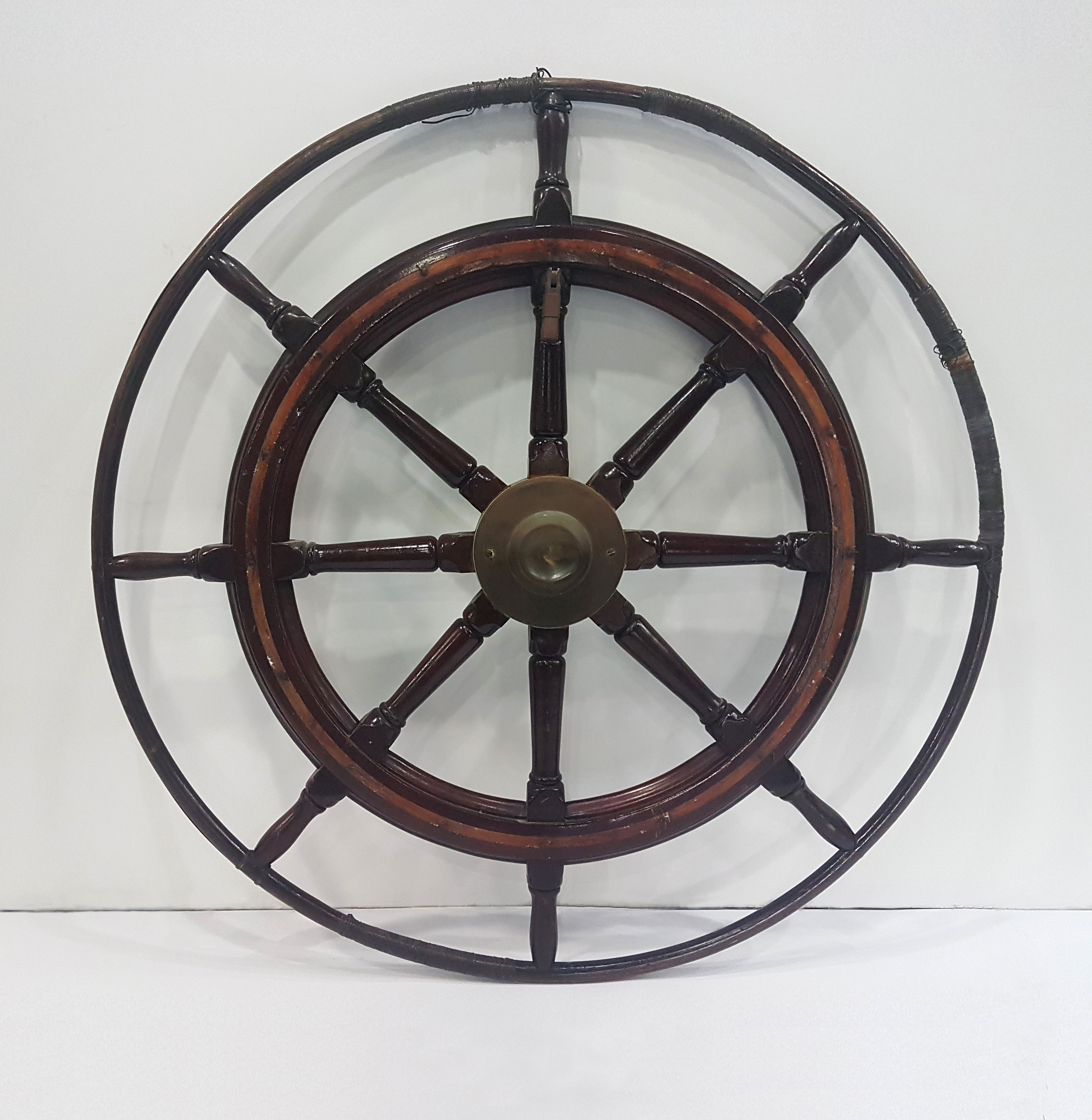
The helm of the peace ship - one of the only items left from the ship from which the Voice of Peace was broadcast (currently displayed in the Hashomer Hatzair archive, Yad-Yaari in Givat Haviva, Israel).

Voice of Peace (Hebrew: קול השלום, Kol HaShalom) was an offshore radio station that broadcast in the Middle East for 20 years from the former Dutch cargo vessel MV Peace (formally MV Cito), anchored off the Israeli coast in the Eastern Mediterranean. Founded by Abie Nathan and the New York-based Peace Ship Foundation, the station broadcast almost continuously between 19 May 1973 and November 1993. The station was relaunched but solely as an online station in August 2009. A second online channel called The Voice of Peace Classics was added in 2014.

== History ==
The aim of the Voice of Peace was to communicate peaceful co-existence to the volatile Middle East. The output was popular music presented by mostly British DJs broadcasting live from the ship. The main on-air studio consisted of a Gates Diplomat mixer, Technics SL-1200 turntables, Sony CD Players, and Gates NAB cartridge machines, on which the jingles and commercials were played. The second studio, for production, had a Gates turntable, reel-to-reel tape recorders, and an NAB cartridge recording unit.

Voice of Peace was Israel's first offshore pop station and the first commercially funded private operation. The station's American PAMS, CPMG, JAM, and TM Productions jingles, English-speaking DJs, and Top 40 hits attracted many advertisers. Initially, the station transmitted on 1539 AM (announced as 1540 AM) and in 1980 added a signal at 100.0 FM.

Notable personalities were involved in broadcasting. The Carpenters, Johnny Mathis and others recorded messages of peace. John and Yoko Lennon signed hundreds of peace posters which Abie Nathan could sell in hard times. During the mid-1970s, the station boasted more than 20 million listeners from the Middle East to southern Europe and Turkey, thanks to the format used by professional broadcasters led by Keith Ashton.

=== Transmitters ===
The original AM/MW transmitter was installed in New York before 1972 and consisted of two 25,000-watt Collins units and a Collins combiner, giving the station a potential 50 kW AM signal. The MW signal was broadcast from a centre-fed horizontal antenna slung between the fore and aft masts, a design similar to those used by Radio Veronica and later Laser 558. The station normally ran at 35 kW until late 1976, when it was decided to operate just one transmitter at a time, keeping the other in reserve. In 1985, Keith York's repair of the combiner enabled the two Collins units to be run together again, resulting in a large mailbag from Turkey, Crete, Greece, and Cyprus, areas the Voice of Peace message hadn't reached for nine years. After these AM transmitters became unserviceable, a Canadian Nautel 10 kW AM transmitter was installed.

A shortwave transmitter was used briefly on 6240 kHz but this was abandoned due to interference problems.

The 20 kW FM transmitter installed in Israel was manufactured by Harris. This, with the antenna array, delivered around 80 kW ERP (Effective Radiated Power) of stereo. A second 20 kW Harris FM transmitter was also installed on board the peace ship.

=== DJs / Presenters ===
Presenters with Voice of Peace included Tony Allan, Chris Phelan, Peter Quinn, Chris Pearson, Nathan Morley, Nigel Harris, Richard West (real name Richard Harding), 'Steaming' Steve Cromby, Steve Richards (real name Steve Joy), Paul Adams (real name Paul Dunnington), Arik Lev, Neil Armstrong, Martin Murphy, Mike O' Sullivan, John Mc Donald, McClellan Hackney, Gavin McCoy, Dave Asher, Chris Garrod, and Grant Benson, Doug Wood, Don Stevens, Keith York, Tony Mandell, Steve Marshall, Steve Greenberg, who became a Grammy-winning producer and president of Columbia Records, was another early-1980s broadcaster. Kenny Page was one of the longest-serving presenters, on board from the 1970s to the 1990s.

=== Programming ===
The Voice of Peace was primarily in English, but a small output included Hebrew, Arabic, and French. Several shows ran for nearly its entire life, including Twilight Time (daily at 18:00, using the Platters hit of the name as its theme), the Classical Music Programme (daily from 19:30), and Late Night Affair (00.00-03.00).

The telephone forum chaired by Abie Nathan called "Kol Ha Lev" (Voice of the Heart) and then Ma La'asot? (?מה לעשות, "What to do?") was the only uncensored direct public dialogue between Israelis and Palestinians.

== Government reaction ==
The Voice of Peace was tolerated by the Israeli Government, as Abie Nathan was a personality in the country; however, the IBA was alarmed at its popularity and set up a state-run pop service, Reshet Gimel, in May 1976. Nathan was imprisoned on several occasions for violating laws forbidding contact with enemy states and the PLO.

== The sinking of the peace ship ==
Nathan decided to intentionally sink the ship in international waters on 28 November 1993 after promises of a broadcast license and mooring in Jaffa port failed, and he closed the station due to heavy losses and following the signing of the Oslo peace accords, which he assumed was validation of the station's mission. On the final day, he instructed the presenters to play the Beatles non-stop. The presenters on the final day included Nathan Morley, Matthew French, Bill Sheldrake and Clive Sinclair.

== Abie Nathan's illness and death ==
Abie Nathan had a stroke in 1997 that left him partially paralyzed. He died in Tel Aviv on 27 August 2008 at 81. On 10 June 2007 Tel Aviv-Yafo decided to post a plaque on the Tel Aviv boardwalk at Gordon Beach, opposite where the Peace Ship had been anchored. This memorial plays recordings of Voice Of Peace, including the station callsign in Nathan's voice and an explanation in Hebrew and English.

Israeli radio station Radius 100 (on VoP's FM frequency) airs weekday tribute programs. The first hour is music in the format of Twilight Time. The second plays hits mostly from the 1970s, 1980s, and early 1990s. Presenters include Gil Katzir, Mike Brand, and Tim Shepherd.

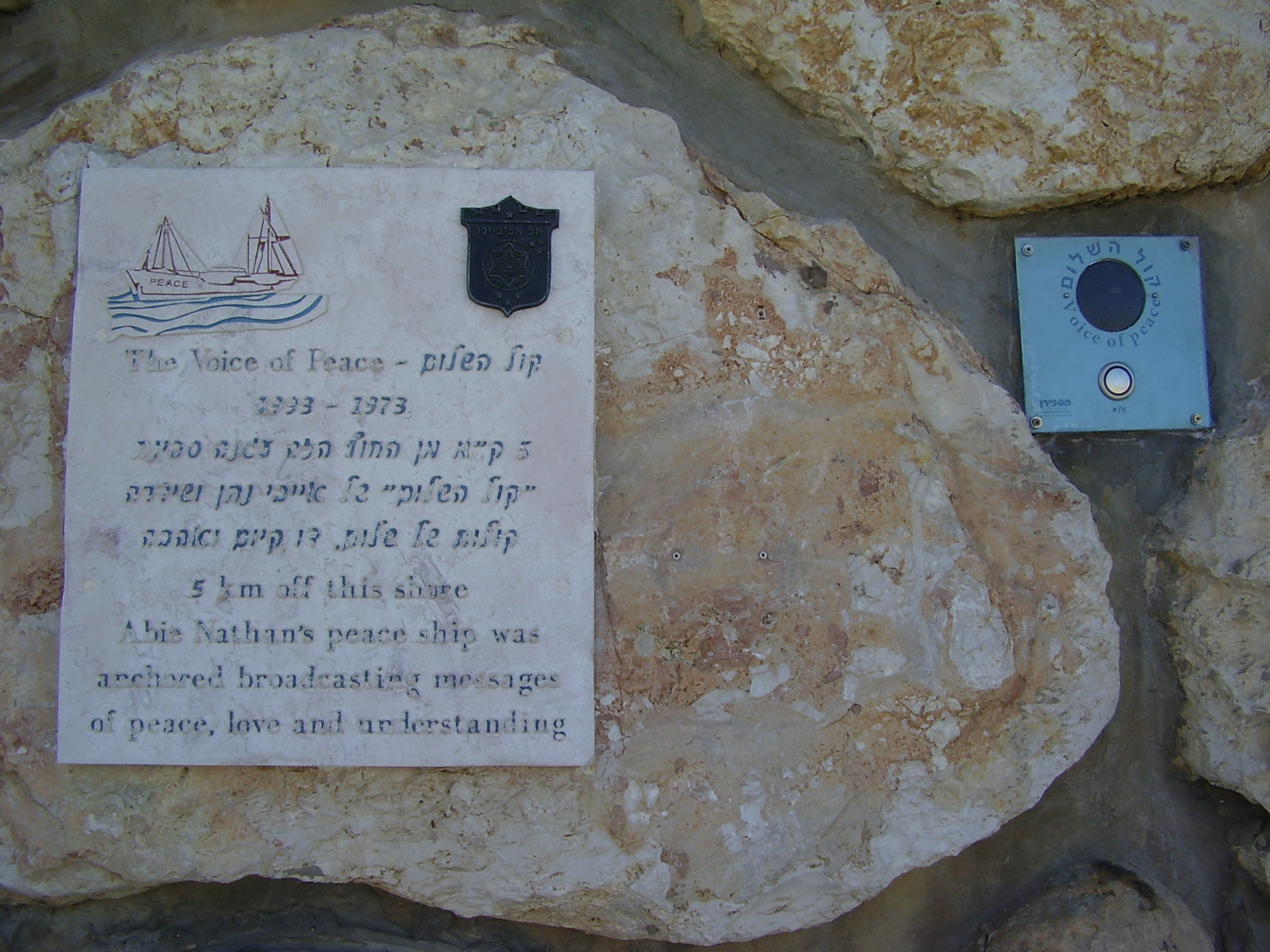
Memorial plaque to "The Voice of Peace" at Tel Aviv's Gordon Beach

In 2003, NMC Music released a CD called the Voice of Peace, featuring songs and jingles from the station. As the Sun Sets, a film about Abie Nathan, soon followed, directed by Eytan Harris. Double CD compilations followed in 2007 and 2008.

== Relaunch ==
In August 2009, The Voice of Peace launched online streaming at 128 kbit/s. It returned on Saturday 7 November 2009 at 12.00 UTC at http://www.thevoiceofPeace.co.il

In 2014, a second channel was added besides the mainstream Voice of Peace. While the main channel continues to offer a mix of contemporary music and oldies, the new 24-hour channel called The Voice of Peace Classic concentrates exclusively on oldies and classic hit songs.

The station had to shut down its broadcasts on 18 July 2020 as maintaining the station had become very difficult because of the COVID-19 epidemic adding that "we will do everything possible to come back to you in the near future." as the announcement read.

The station is up and running as of May 2025, streaming from various DJs around the world, broadcasting in English and Hebrew, with aspirations to host content in Arabic and French.

== See also ==
- Arutz Sheva
- Pirate Radio

== Sources ==
- Radius 100FM Voice of Peace page
- More pictures of the ship
- Soundscapes VOP article
- Remembering the Voice of Peace (oral history series)
- Israeli Pirate radio - past and present
