= Kenny Page =

Kenny Page (died July 29th 2002) was a Scottish radio broadcaster, known for his on-air comedy pranks and slick American-style presentation. He started his radio career on Radio Clyde presenting a short feature called Ken’s Corner in 1974.

Kenneth Page was born in Stirling on April 13, 1955 to Margaret Page and Albert Stanley Preen. Page has sisters Carol and Elizabeth, as well as brothers Michael and Roddy.

After a brief stint at the BBC working in administration he joined the British pop-pirate station Radio Caroline in the summer of 1976, initially under the name Jimmy James and later Kenny James before finally adopting his own name. In the late 1970s he boarded The Voice of Peace, a popular Israeli offshore station. He was later a part of the launch team at Scotland’s Radio Tay, where he hosted the Drivetime show until the mid-1980s.

He returned to the Voice of Peace as programme manager until its closedown in 1993. Stints on Radio Tay, Kingdom FM and Radio Napa in Cyprus followed, plus occasional appearances as a comedy character on Virgin Radio.

Page gained massive radio audiences in Israel and his departure from the country in 1993 saw him featured in many national newspapers outlining his reasons for leaving. Such was his popularity in his native Scotland that his death in 2002 was marked with a special 30 minute broadcast about his life, simulcast on Tay AM and Tay FM.
