= Peter Tait (radio presenter) =

- Born: Peter Richard Tait; 15 March 1950; Croydon, Surrey, England
- Died: 20 September 2002 (aged 52); Leeds, West Yorkshire, England
- Occupation: Radio presenter
- Years active: 1977–2002

Peter Richard Tait (15 March 1950 – 20 September 2002) was an English radio presenter.

== Early career ==
Tait was born in Croydon, Surrey, England. After leaving school, he started a career in insurance, however he soon turned professional as a DJ with residencies in Leicester, Southend-On-Sea, Richmond, Brighton, East Grinstead and Croydon.

In 1977, he got a job at U.B.N. which was a radio station for the workers of United Biscuits. After 18 months, he landed the job as afternoon show presenter at Radio Trent in Nottingham where he worked for five years.

In 1983, Radio Caroline relaunched and returned to the North Sea. Tait was offered the Radio Caroline breakfast show where he was known as Peter Clark, and attracted an audience of over three million listeners, however due to the station having a lack of revenue, he left after three months.

== Later career ==
On 2 January 1984, he joined Radio Aire in Leeds where he initially hosted the early breakfast show, but was quickly moved to present the breakfast show within a few months. By late 1986, he was presenting the drivetime show, hosting competitions such as 'Take on Tait', where he would invite listeners to call him to test his vast musical knowledge. He was back on the breakfast show by mid-1988 where he remained until the station frequency split in 1990. Tait was also a regular presenter on the overnight sustaining service, The Superstation, so was often heard on many independent local radio stations across the UK.

On 17 July 1990, Magic 828 was launched and Tait initially presented the afternoon show. By 1992, he had moved to the breakfast show where he remained until 2002, with a format similar to the one he had used on Radio Aire. At this point, Magic 828 were the number one AM station in the country, attracting 169,000 listeners.

During his time at Radio Aire and Magic 828, Tait arranged and hosted many successful party nights. The Radio Aire Solid Gold Nights and Magic 828 Party Nights featured acts such as Bobby Vee, Mud, The Three Degrees and Odyssey.

== Death ==
In February 2002, family and friends were concerned about his health which prompted him to see a doctor. He died on 20 September 2002. On the Monday following his death, Magic 828 and Radio Aire paid tribute to Tait with extended news bulletins, featuring archive clips from his old shows and comments from his colleagues and friends, including Dale Winton.
