= Phil Kennedy =

British radio presenter and podcaster

Phil Kennedy is a British broadcaster. He presents the podcast Phil Kennedy - Mildly Getting Away With It. His career includes work in British radio, television and podcasting.

== Career ==
Kennedy left medical school, where he was studying to be a medical doctor, to join Radio Jackie in London. He then joined Radio Top Shop, also in London.

Kennedy presented a Saturday evening show on BBC Radio 1 in the 1980s, starting in late 1984.

Kennedy's work in the 1980s was at several companies. This included, in the mid-1980s, presentation of the early breakfast show on Radio City in Liverpool, and in the late 1980s, presentation of a late night programme for the Superstation service, which was broadcast on many different commercial radio stations in the UK.

In the early 1990s he worked at Reading's 2-Ten FM and BBC GLR, the BBC's local radio station for London. In 1994, he was presenting the weekday early breakfast show on BBC GLR. In the late 1990s, he was a presenter at Virgin Radio in the UK.

In 2002, Kennedy presented a football programme for Channel 4 in East Asia.

As of 2006, he was the presenter of the drivetime programme on BBC Radio Berkshire, with the show containing interviews, news, sports news and travel news. As of 2020, he was the presenter of the drivetime programme on the same station, although the programme moved to a 2pm-6pm slot in the same year. The programme ended in 2023, just before BBC Radio Berkshire began to share its 2-6pm afternoon programme with BBC Radio Oxford.

Kennedy presented a Saturday morning programme on BBC Radio Oxford, with the programme starting in the 2008 at the latest and finishing in 2012.

Kennedy started presenting a podcast, Phil Kennedy - Mildly Getting Away With It, in 2023. The programme features interviews of famous guests.

He has also presented on BBC Radio 6 Music, Virgin Radio and LBC. Outside of the media, he has worked in a variety of jobs, including as a wine bottle stacker and as an assistant in a psychiatric treatment facility.
