= BBC Radio Oxford =

Coordinates: 51°46′45″N 1°15′58″W

- Oxford; England
- Broadcast area: Oxfordshire
- Frequencies: FM: 95.2 MHz; DAB: 10B; Freeview: 714
- RDS: BBC OXFD

Programming
- Language: English
- Format: Local news, talk, music and sport

Ownership
- Owner: BBC Local Radio, BBC South

History
- First air date: 29 October 1970
- Former names: BBC Thames Valley FM (1996–2000)
- Former frequencies: 95.0 FM; 1484 / 1485 MW

Technical information
- Licensing authority: Ofcom

Links
- Website: www.bbc.co.uk/radiooxford/

BBC Radio Oxford is the BBC's local radio station serving the county of Oxfordshire.

It broadcasts on FM, DAB, digital TV and via BBC Sounds from studios in the Summertown area of Oxford.

According to RAJAR, the station has a weekly audience of 87,000 listeners and a 3.5% share as of December 2023.

== History ==
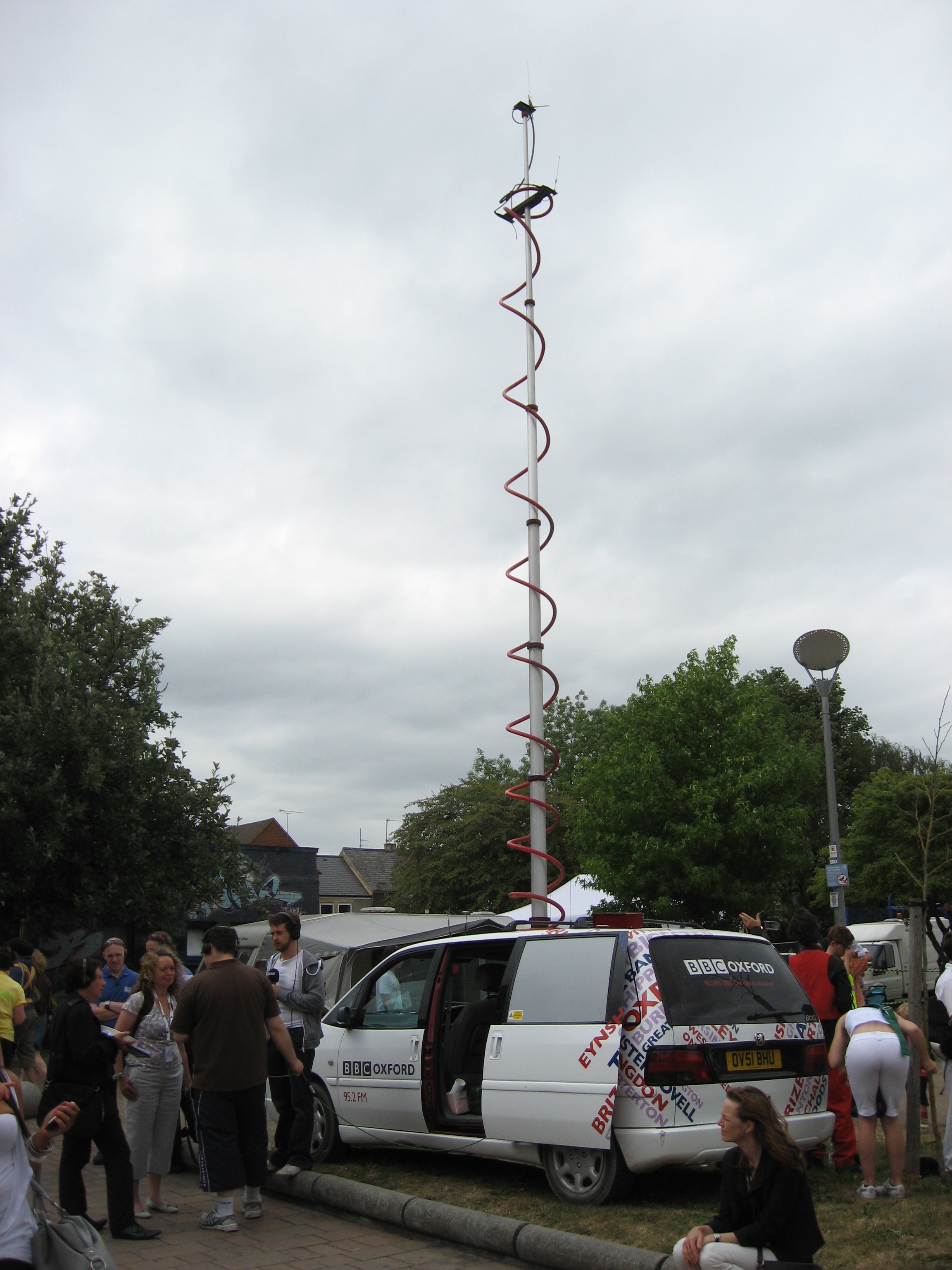
BBC Oxford radio car at the Cowley Road Festival 2010

- Early 1970 – Oxford was chosen as a location for BBC local radio and premises in Summertown were found at 242–254 Banbury Road. The site is known as Barclay House and was previously a Rolls-Royce showroom.
- Mid 1970 – Staff were recruited, a small number with BBC experience but mostly local people, and the studios at Summertown are built.
- September 1970 – On air staff trained at the Langham Hotel in London.
- Early October 1970 – Three weeks of test transmissions begin.
- 29 October 1970 – BBC Radio Oxford officially begins transmission at 5 pm on 95.0 MHz VHF.
- 31 December 1970 – Radio Times lists BBC Radio Oxford programmes for the first time.
- 5 October 1972 – Due to high demand by residents who did not have FM on their radios, BBC Radio Oxford begins broadcasting on 202 metres medium wave (1484 kHz). The station would also be available on the local cable network on 'Rediffusion Channel A'.
- 26 June 1973 – BBC Radio Oxford moves its VHF frequency to 95.2 MHz to avoid interference with BBC Radio London on 94.9 MHz.
- 22 May 1976 – The station opens its studios to the public for an open weekend.
- October 1980 – BBC Radio Oxford celebrates 10 years on air by publishing a magazine.
- April / May 1989 – BBC Radio Oxford moves to purpose-built studios at 269 Banbury Road, Summertown.
- 9 April 1996 – Radio Oxford merges with BBC Radio Berkshire to form the short-lived BBC Thames Valley FM. Local programming is restricted to separate news bulletins for the two counties.
- 14 February 2000 – Radio Oxford is revived, although most output continues to be shared with Radio Berkshire.
- 2004 – BBC Radio Oxford relaunches with a new line-up of presenters. By now, the station has regained a full line-up of local programming.
- April 2008 – The station is rebranded as BBC Oxford 95.2FM as part of a relaunch involving the regional TV news programme BBC Oxford News (previously BBC South Today Oxford).
- October 2010 – The station celebrates its 40th anniversary and reverts to the Radio Oxford branding.
- 21 December 2012 – BBC Radio Oxford's DAB service is launched.

== Programming ==
Local programming is produced and broadcast from the BBC's Oxford studios from 6 am to 10 pm on weekdays, from 6 am to 6 pm and 8 pm to 9 pm on Saturdays, and from 6 am to 6 pm and 10 pm to 1 am on Sundays.

Off-peak programming, including the late show from 10 pm to 1 am, originates from BBC Radio Solent in Southampton and BBC Radio Berkshire in Reading.

During the station's downtime, BBC Radio Oxford simulcasts overnight programming from BBC Radio 5 Live and BBC Radio London.

== Technical ==
The service is broadcast across Oxfordshire on 95.2 FM and DAB from the Oxford transmitting station situated north east of Oxford.

There are also other DAB transmitters that broadcast Radio Oxford including, Over Norton, Farthinghoe, Boars Hill and Woodcote.

The station also broadcasts on Freeview TV channel 714 in the BBC South region and streams online via BBC Sounds.

== Presenters ==
=== Notable past presenters ===
- Richard Allinson (now on Greatest Hits Radio)
- Malcolm Boyden
- Jon Briggs (original UK voice of Apple's Siri)
- Humphrey Carpenter
- Anne Diamond
- Mike Dickin
- Will Gompertz
- Jonathan Hancock
- Bob Harris (now on BBC Radio 2)
- Bill Heine
- Martin Kelner
- Alex Lester (now on Greatest Hits Radio)
- Timmy Mallett
- Andrew Peach (now on BBC Radio 4 and BBC Radio Berkshire)
- David Prever (weekday breakfast, now Head of Programming at Radio News Hub)
- Libby Purves (later at BBC Radio 4, now on Times Radio)
- Alan Roberts
- Sybil Ruscoe
- Tim Smith (later at BBC Radio 2, now on Jazz FM)
- Martin Stanford (formerly of Sky News, now on LBC News)
- Tony Blackburn (Sunday evenings)
- Bill Rennells (Harmony Night)

== See also ==
- Oxford University Broadcasting Society (former producer of BBC Oxford programmes)
