= Greatest Hits Radio West Yorkshire =

Radio station in West Yorkshire, England

- Leeds Bradford Huddersfield Halifax Wakefield; United Kingdom
- Broadcast area: West Yorkshire
- Frequencies: FM: 96.3 MHz (Leeds); 106.8 MHz (Wakefield); DAB: 11B; 12D

Programming
- Format: Classic Hits
- Network: Greatest Hits Radio

Ownership
- Owner: Bauer
- Sister stations: Hits Radio West Yorkshire

History
- First air date: 7 January 2019
- Former names: Radio Aire; Magic 828/Radio Aire 2 Ridings FM; Pulse 2
- Former frequencies: 828 kHz; 1278 kHz; 1530 kHz

Links
- Website: GHR West Yorkshire

Greatest Hits Radio West Yorkshire (previously Radio Aire, Magic 828/Radio Aire 2, Ridings FM and Pulse 2) is an Independent Local Radio station serving West Yorkshire on 96.3 and 106.8 FM, DAB, online and via the app. It is part of the Greatest Hits Radio network.

The station was launched on 7 January 2019, replacing Radio Aire 2, following the decision to remove local station names from the northern England Medium Wave stations owned by Bauer Media.

As of March 2024, the station broadcasts to a weekly audience of 177,000 listeners, according to RAJAR.

== History ==
=== Radio Aire ===
Radio Aire broadcast to Leeds and Wakefield on 96.3 MHz FM from 1 September 1981 until 31 August 2020. See dedicated page for Radio Aire for a full station history.

=== Magic 828 ===
Magic 828 was launched by Roger Kirk at 8:28 am on 17 July 1990. The station was formed due to Radio Aire splitting its AM and FM frequencies, with Radio Aire rebranding as Aire FM. The station broadcast on 828 kHz AM and the first song played was "Magical Mystery Tour" by The Beatles.

The 'Magic 828' name was created by Bob Preedy who was a presenter on Radio Aire at the time. The first jingle package was produced by Century 21 and the voice-overs were voiced by John Myers.

The programmes between 6am and 1am were broadcast live from Studio 2 in Radio Aire's Burley Road studio complex in Leeds. The original weekday line-up was Roger Kirk (6am-9.30am), Ray Stroud (9.30am-1pm), The Magic Mix (1pm-2pm), Peter Tait (2pm-6pm), Nothing But The 60's (6pm-7pm), Mike Vitti (7pm-10pm), Alex Hall (10pm-1am) and The Superstation (1am-6am). A few months after Magic 828's launch, The Superstation closed, Andy Siddell took over evenings and Mike Vitti presented the new overnight programme, Nightflight. The Nightflight programme was simulcast on Aire FM & Magic 828 and broadcast between 1am & 6am from Studio 1 (the studio used for Aire FM). Local news during the early 1990s was also simulcast on both stations, although Aire FM only took the first two minutes of the four-minute bulletin.

After EMAP bought Radio Aire and Magic 828 in 1995, they began to roll out the Magic brand across all their AM stations in the north of England. These were Magic 1161 (East Yorkshire), Magic AM (South Yorkshire), Magic 1152 (Newcastle), Magic 1170 (Teesside), Magic 999 (Lancashire), Magic 1548 (Merseyside) and Magic 1152 (Manchester). EMAP's other station, Touch AM went to Capital Gold instead due to Capital Radio Group acquiring Red Dragon FM and its AM sister station.

In December 2001, EMAP decided that it was more economical for the Magic network to share off-peak programmes and in line with the other Magic AM stations began networking between 10am and 2pm, and between 7pm and 6am. During these hours it was simply known as Magic, although there were local commercial breaks and local news and weather on the hour through the day. Peter Tait, who had hosted the Breakfast Show since 1992 continued to present Breakfast, while Andy Siddell presented the Afternoon Show.

Peter Tait died in 2002 and the Breakfast Show was subsequently presented by Paul Carrington. In January 2003 after a sharp decline in listening, the station ceased networking with the London station Magic 105.4. At this point, a regional northern network was created with programmes broadcast from Magic 1152 in Newcastle. During networked hours, local commercials were aired, as well as local news and weather on the hour.

In July 2006, more networking was introduced across the northern Magic AM network with only the four hour breakfast show between 6am and 10am presented from the local studios. At this point, Andy Siddell moved to Newcastle to present the Afternoon Show across the network. In 2007, Glenn Pinder took over the Breakfast Show where he remained until 2014, although in April 2013 the show also started to be networked across the other Yorkshire-based Magic stations. Other programming was networked from Newcastle, Manchester and London.

=== Radio Aire 2 ===
Following the rebrand of the Magic AM stations in northern England, on 5 January 2015 Magic 828 became known as Radio Aire 2. All programming at this point was networked, except for news, weather, travel and commercials.

=== Pulse 2 ===
Pulse 2 was the final version of the oldies and classic hits station that had served the western half of West Yorkshire on MW from 1989 until 2020. See dedicated page for Pulse 2 for a full history.

=== Ridings FM ===
Ridings FM broadcast to Wakefield and the Five Towns area of West Yorkshire on 106.8 MHz FM from 3 October 1999 until 31 August 2020. See dedicated page for Ridings FM for a full station history.

== Greatest Hits Radio ==
Greatest Hits Radio was formed on 7 January 2019. Radio Aire 2 became Greatest Hits Radio West Yorkshire, while the other Bauer owned Medium Wave stations in the north of England were given names specific to their region. However, the on air name is known simply as Greatest Hits Radio.

On 1 September 2020, it began to broadcast on 96.3 FM, replacing Radio Aire and the Leeds medium wave transmitter was later switched off. Ridings FM and Pulse 2 were closed and replaced with Greatest Hits Radio West Yorkshire on the same day, meaning the station was also made available on 106.8 FM and Pulse 2's DAB and Medium Wave frequencies, although the remaining MW frequencies were later switched off.

Since November 2024, when the sole regional programme, a weekday afternoon show broadcast from the Leeds studios by Steve Priestley - Stephanie Hirst regularly covered the show in Priestley's absence - ended, all programming has been fully networked with most shows coming from Greatest Hits Radio in London, although some programming comes from Liverpool and Manchester. Bespoke localised news and weather bulletins are broadcast during the day, as is peak-time local travel news and local commercials.
