= QEFM =

- Broadcast area: Europe
- Frequencies: Astra 1A, Transponder 16, Subcarrier 7.38/7.56 MHz

Programming
- Format: MOR/Pop

Ownership
- Owner: Radio Cheltenham Ltd then Quality Europe FM Ltd.

History
- First air date: 1991
- Last air date: 1994

Quality Europe FM was a UK radio station transmitted across Europe via the Astra 1A satellite in the early 1990s. QEFM was one of the first European radio stations to use Direct to Home reception as its primary method of delivery, despite the use of the acronym "FM" (a reference to FM broadcasting) in its name.

== History ==
The station first broadcast briefly from Cheltenham (1991–1993). Quality Europe FM started when Roy Litchfield approached Ray Pearson and suggested that he take up a short licence to cover the Cheltenham Festival of Music that year. "We kitted out a Caravan and sold local advertising. The idea then formed to go Satellite and as I had space in the top floor of a large house I had built, we constructed our own studios. We had many local presenters join us and many celebrities climbed the stair to our 2 studios. We played a full programme of music and covered many topics. We had many on air competitions which gained us a terrific following all over Europe. But sadly, finance from advertisers meant that the tight budget we maintained was not viable."

It then moved to studios located in the building of Hi-Tec Xtravision (a now defunct satellite decoder manufacturer linked to Radio Caroline and Radio North Sea International presenter Chris Cary) in Albany Park, Camberley, Surrey, UK, which it later shared with its sister station Quality Country Music Radio (later known as Country Music Radio). The first broadcast from the new studios in Camberley was by Terry James. QEFM closed down in 1994 after a series of financial and management related problems. At its peak QEFM boasted 23.8 million listeners a week in over 26 countries and had become the number one satellite station in Europe, following the demise of Radio Luxembourg in 1992.

== Presentation ==
On air QEFM had a polished style, and the studios in Camberley became home to several presenters who went on to greater fame. One such name was Dave Lee Travis, who after leaving the BBC in a much publicised split, briefly presented his independent commercial show via the station. Todd Slaughter, President of the Official Elvis Presley Fan Club, also broadcast an Elvis Show which he handed over to Mike Adams, ex-Radio One contributor and BBC Midlands presenter.

While QEFM was primarily a MOR and pop music station, one of the few programmes to survive the station's closure in 1994 was Eric Wiltsher's "Satellite Surgery" (later known as the "Media Zoo"), which having originally moved to QEFM from Euronet, transferred across to Country Music Radio.

== Station personnel ==
In Cheltenham:

- Ray Pearson – Managing Director
- Roy Litchfield – Station Manager
- Clive Pearson – Station Assistant

== Former presenters ==
- Mike Adams
- Karl Bennett
- Terry Boydell (as Terry James)
- Stuart Cameron
- Jonathan Cohen
- Edward Cole
- Nick David
- Neil Francis
- Nick Gurney
- Steve Grant
- Nicky James
- Keith Lewis
- Roy Litchfield
- Christopher Musk
- Alan Roberts (as Paul Revere)
- Andy Roberts
- Dave Lee Travis
- Neil Vincent
- Gary Weston
- Emma Whittard
- Steve Wilkinson
- Chris Williams (Now at Manx Radio)
- Lee Williams
- Eric Wiltsher
- Simon Winyard
- Chris Jones
- Todd Slaughter
- Phil Humphris
- Spencer Evans
