= Abie Nathan =

Humanitarian, Voice of Peace radio founder

Avraham "Abie" Nathan
- אברהם "אייבי" נתן
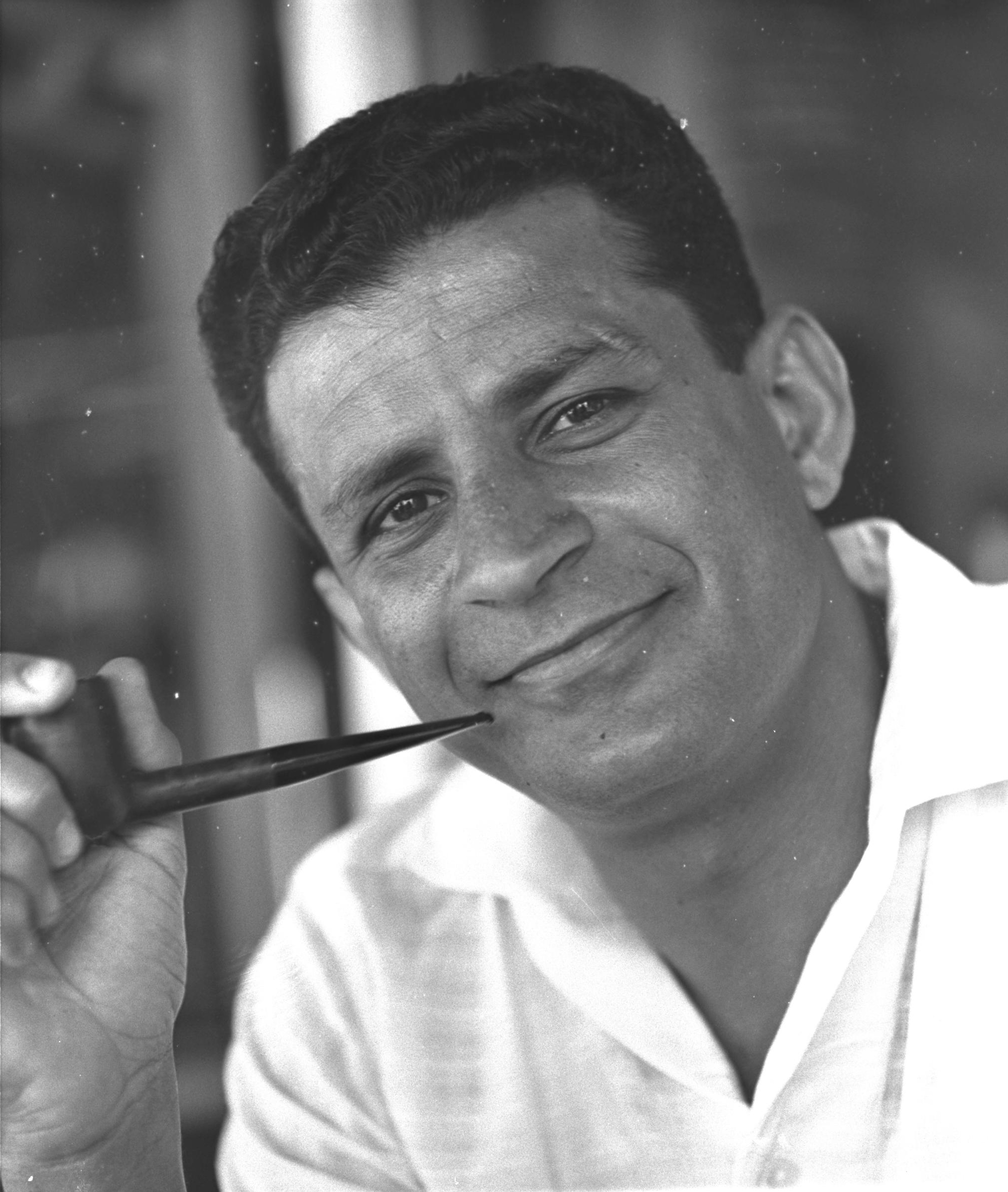
- Nathan (1961)
- Born: 29 April 1927; Abadan, Persia
- Died: 27 August 2008 (aged 81); Tel Aviv, Israel
- Citizenship: Israeli
- Occupations: humanitarian and peace activist
- Known for: Founder of the Voice of Peace radio station
- Website: www.abie-nathan.com

Avraham "Abie" Nathan (Hebrew: אברהם "אייבי" נתן, pronounced AY-bee; 29 April 1927 – 27 August 2008) was an Israeli humanitarian and peace activist. He founded the Voice of Peace radio station. When he died the president of Israel Shimon Peres said about him: "He was one of the most prominent and special people in the country... He is the man who dedicated his life for other people and for a better humanity".

== Early years ==
Abie Nathan was born to a Jewish family in Abadan, Persia, on 29 April 1927, and spent his adolescent years in Bombay (now Mumbai), India. He became a pilot in the Royal Air Force in 1944. In 1948 he volunteered as a pilot in the Machal (volunteers in the 1948 Arab–Israeli War) and stayed in Israel thereafter. He worked for El Al airlines and later opened a restaurant in Tel Aviv.

== Flight for Peace ==
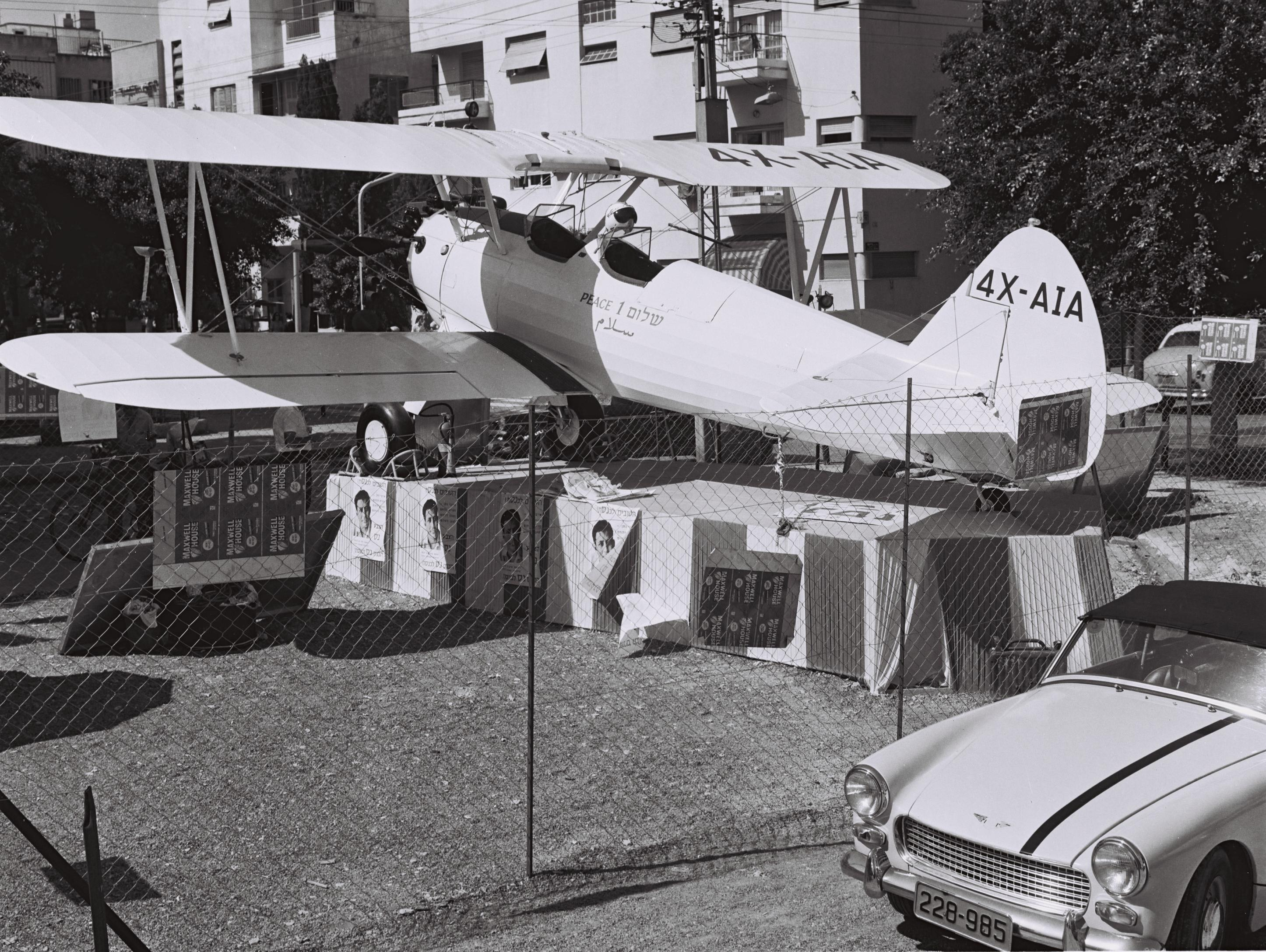
Abie Nathan's Peace Now plane 1965

Nathan led a party called Nes (Miracle) in the 1965 Knesset elections, but failed to cross the electoral threshold. After the results were published, he declared that he would fly to Egypt in his plane, which he named Shalom 1 ("Peace 1"), carrying a message of peace. He landed in Port Said on 28 February 1966, where he was arrested. He asked to meet Egyptian President Gamal Abdel Nasser to deliver a petition calling for peace between Israel and Egypt. He was refused and deported back to Israel, where he was arrested again for leaving the country by an illegal route.

== Meetings with PLO ==
In 1978, Nathan began his second hunger strike to protest against the construction of Israeli settlements. In the early 1980s, he began meeting officials from the Palestine Liberation Organization (PLO). These meetings were later outlawed by the Knesset. In 1991, Nathan went on another hunger strike for 40 days to protest against that law, which prevented meetings with alleged terrorist organizations. He stopped his hunger strike after President Chaim Herzog intervened. Nathan continued to meet with PLO head Yasser Arafat, however, and on 18 September 1991 he was sentenced to 18 months in prison. Herzog cut 12 months from the sentence, and Nathan was released after serving less than 6 months.

== Voice of Peace and humanitarian activities ==
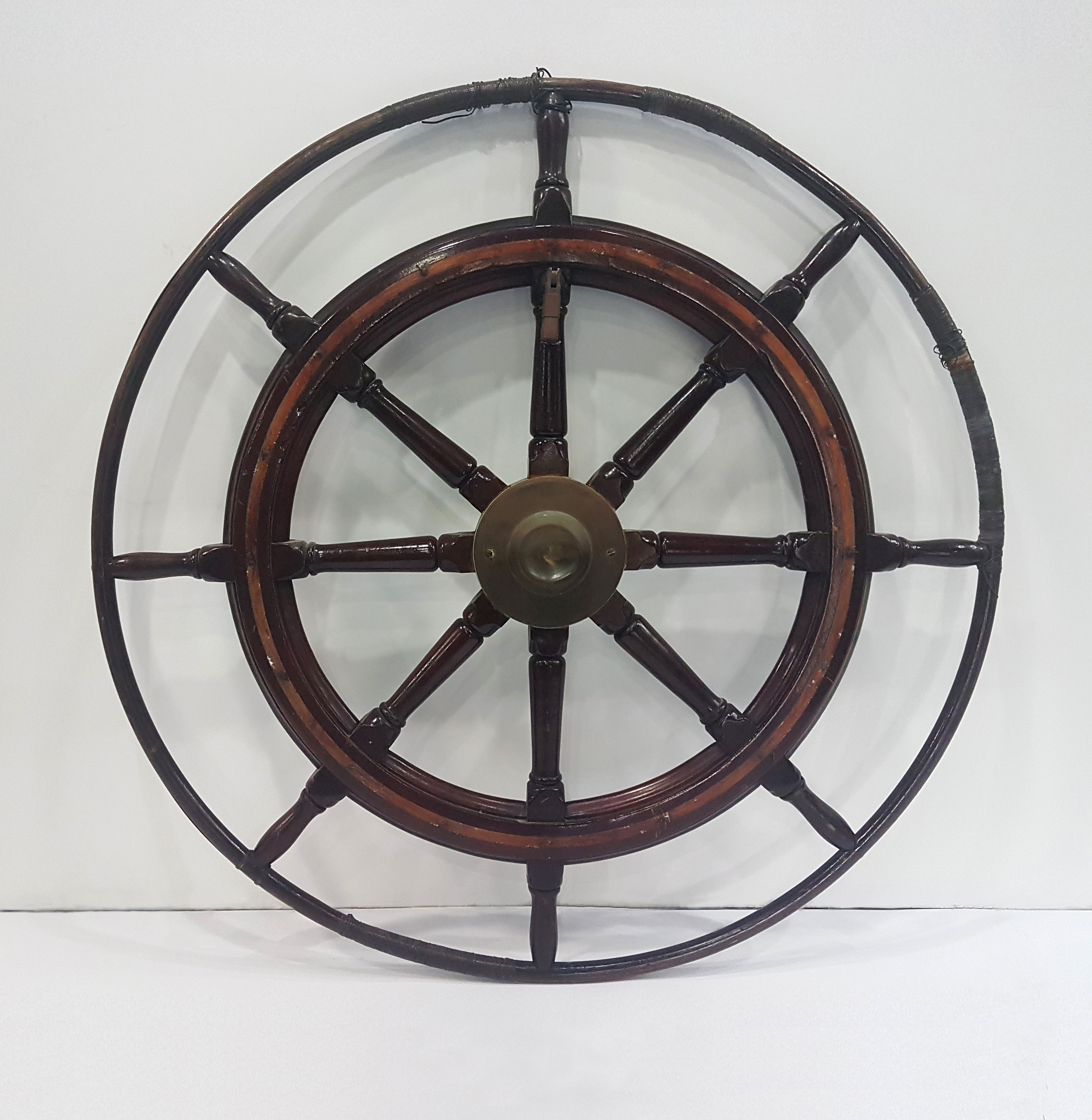
The helm of the Peace Ship – one of the only items left from the ship from which the Voice of Peace was broadcast (currently displayed in the Hashomer Hatzair archive, Yad-Yaari in Givat Haviva, Israel).

Abie's first hunger strike was in 1972 while the SS Shalom was docked in NJ, Abie unable to generate enough funding to get it outfitted. A young Daniel Syme, later director of UAHC, invited Abie, then in a wheelchair, to break his fast in an Oneg Shabbat at Kutz Camp in Warwick, NY during NFTY National Board Institute. After Shabbos, the NFTY board bused down to the UN building and marched around for several hours singing to raise awareness, led by Doug Mishkin. Funds appeared and Abie sailed to become the only non-partisan broadcaster in the Middle East.

In 1973, Nathan founded the Voice of Peace radio station. He bought a ship with the help of John Lennon, named it the "Peace Ship", and sailed it outside Israeli territorial waters. The station broadcast 24 hours a day, mostly English-language programs that mainly included popular music, while promoting Nathan's political activities. At the same time, he was involved with disaster relief in Cambodia, Bangladesh, Biafra, Colombia, and Ethiopia. In another anti-war protest, he presided over the burial of smashed military toys.

Nathan founded, at the beginning of 1980, "Abie's Angels" – an organisation of volunteers that helped each other when needed. In August of that year, together with the non-political movement for quality of life and society in Israel Am Yafe Am Ehad (One Beautiful People One Nation) he set up a trust for the elderly named "Keren Sevá Tová" (a ripe old age) that provided clothes and household ware to old people in need. At the end of that year he received an award from the Knesset (Israeli parliament) for setting up a social lobby for the elderly.

On 1 October 1993, economic and legal difficulties forced Nathan to close the Voice of Peace station. One of the reasons for closing was that, with the signing of the Oslo Peace Accords, Nathan felt that his message for peace and dialogue between Israelis and Palestinians had been spread. The Peace Ship was scuttled on 28 November 1993.

== Illness, death and tributes ==
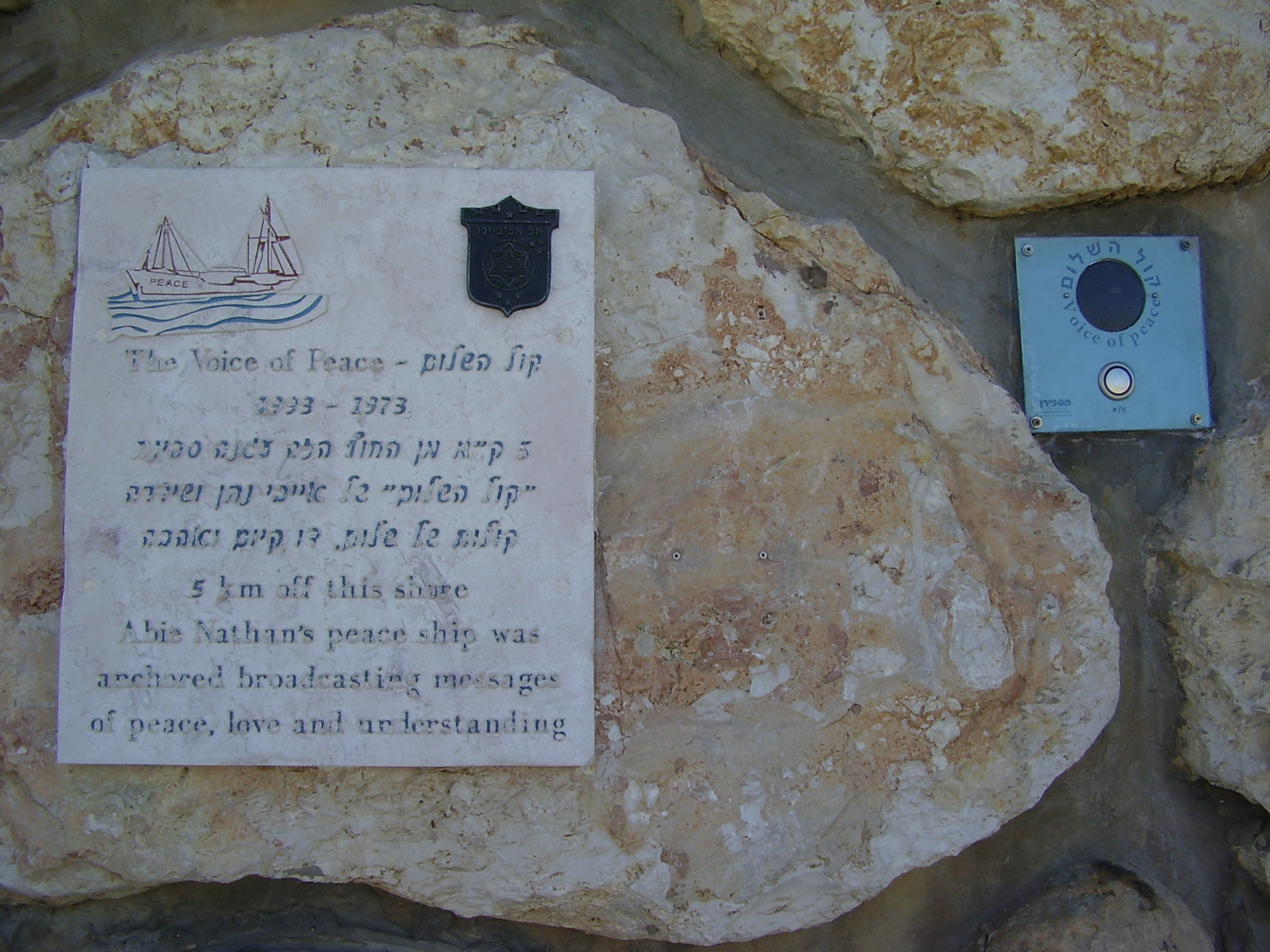
Memorial plaque to "The Voice of Peace" at Tel Aviv's Gordon Beach

In 1997, Nathan suffered a stroke that left him partially paralyzed. He died in Tel Aviv on 27 August 2008 at age 81. On 10 June 2007 the Tel Aviv-Yafo municipality passed a resolution to post a commemorative plaque on the Tel Aviv boardwalk at Gordon Beach, opposite where the Peace Ship had been anchored. This memorial plays recordings of the Voice of Peace, including the station callsign in Nathan's voice and an explanation in both Hebrew and English.

== See also ==
- List of peace activists
- Mathias Rust
