= Martin Kelner =

British journalist and broadcaster

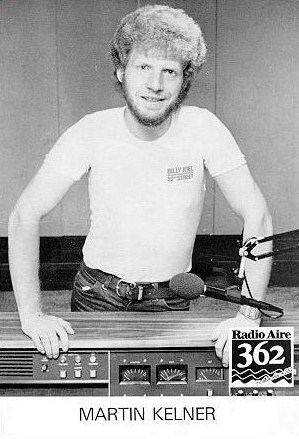
- Kelner in 1982
- Born: Martin Barry Kelner
- Presenting career
- Country: United Kingdom
- Website: http://www.martinkelner.com

Martin Barry Kelner is a British journalist, author, comedian, singer, actor and TV presenter, whose primary career is in radio presenting. He has spent over 40 years hosting radio shows, mostly for the BBC, in particular Radio Leeds. He has been regularly accompanied throughout his career by comedy sidekick Edouard Lapaglie.

== Education and early career ==
Kelner studied Arts and Social Studies at Strathclyde University in Glasgow, but dropped out. He was employed as a reporter on the Western Daily Press in Bristol and for the Oxford Mail. He then joined the Central Office of Information, for whom he worked in Bristol, Lambeth, South London and in Birmingham.

Martin Kelner moved to Radio Hallam in Sheffield to begin his career in radio. He started reading the breakfast show news before moving on to his own late night show. He spent a brief spell at London's LBC and Manchester's Piccadilly Radio, before moving to Leeds in 1981 and the fledgling Radio Aire.

He left Radio Aire in late 1982, and worked for Yorkshire TV for a time on a programme called Calendar It's The Weekend. He was also a co-presenter on BBC Breakfast. Other television excursions for Kelner include Brainwave, a daytime quiz show and Pick of the Week.

== Radio ==
In 1984 Kelner joined the BBC. He initially presented the weekday early show on BBC Radio 2 in September and October 1984, and then presented his own Saturday night show on the same station from 6 July 1985 until 24 March 1990, also returning to the early show for two stints during 1985. He fronted his own Saturday afternoon show on Radio 2 from 1 October 1994 to 23 March 1996. He also did many stand-ins for regular presenters on the network, peaking in the mid-1990s when he regularly deputised for Sarah Kennedy on the weekday early show (both when she sat in for Terry Wogan and when she was on holiday herself) and also sat in for Ken Bruce and John Dunn. He also presented editions of the Radio 2 Arts Programme from the north of England, and a programme called Let It Be... Please! featuring bad or embarrassing cover versions of the Beatles' songs. He then fell out of favour at the national station, presenting his last Radio 2 show sitting in for Sarah Kennedy on 29 November 1996.

At the same time as he was on Radio 2, he was also presenting a local radio late-night show from the Radio Leeds studios and broadcast across the BBC Night Network in the north, on which he first gave airtime to radio comedy sketches from Caroline Aherne. She portrayed the Mrs Merton character on his radio show ad-libbing conversations with Kelner for around eight years. He also introduced Aherne into network broadcasting on Radio 2 and the original BBC Radio 5, where he presented the programme Five Aside for the station's opening months in 1990.

He returned to Manchester to present the breakfast show on 100.4 Jazz FM, where he introduced another great comic talent to the public in the shape of Jake Yapp's Dora Dale, with whom Martin produced the hit BBC Radio 7 comedy show, Pleased To Meet You. This show was nominated for a Sony National Radio Award on 28 March 2007 in the category of Best Comedy Programme.

Until October 2006, Kelner presented the Friday and Saturday late show at the weekends on BBC Radio Humberside, BBC Radio York, BBC Radio Leeds and BBC Radio Sheffield.

Other stations he has worked for include BBC Thames Valley FM, BBC Radio Cleveland, Pennine Radio, BBC Radio 5 Live, TalkSport, BBC Radio Manchester, Real Radio Yorkshire and Mansfield 103.2 FM.

From 2006 until 2021 he presented his own podcast, the Piss Poor Podcast, accompanied for the most part by Edouard Lapaglie. He also appears on BBC Radio 5 Live as a regular panellist on Fighting Talk (twice finishing as series runner up and twice winning the series championship, in 2013 and 2019), and has contributed to Chart The Week on Richard Bacon's programme. His most regular radio slot had been the BBC Radio Leeds Breakfast Show which he co-presented Monday to Thursday from 6:30am to 9:00am, but he was moved to the lunchtime slot in November 2012.

Due to a change in direction of the station, Kelner left Radio Leeds again, presenting his last show on 18 March 2016.

On 2 February 2018, Kelner joined the DAB station TalkRadio, hosting weekend mornings from 1am to 5am.

He will leave Talkradio at end of August 2025

== Writing and journalism ==
Kelner's journalism includes a weekly column for The Guardian, "Screen Break", which took a lighthearted look at the world of sport on TV, and a fortnightly column about radio. "Screen Break" finished on 31 December 2012. He writes occasional travel pieces for The Mail on Sunday, and has written for The Independent, of which his brother Simon Kelner was executive editor. Kelner began writing for the Racing Post at the beginning of 2013.

Other publications he has written for include GQ, Men's Health, Later (now defunct), RCME, The Observer, Land Rover Owner magazine, You magazine, and Public Servant, the local and national government journal. He also has contributed to the YouGov website, and wrote television previews for the Daily Mail around 1994/95. He has posted humorous product reviews on Amazon.

His first book, about the outer suburbs of show business, was called When Will I Be Famous?. His second book, Sit Down and Cheer, looked at the history of sport on British television.

== Personal life ==
Kelner's daughter, Martha, is a journalist.

=== Health problems ===
in the summer of 2013, Kelner was diagnosed with fibromatosis; he later had surgery to remove a sarcoma from his abdomen and was cared for at St James Hospital, Leeds. He was later treated at the hospital's intensive treatment unit for a week, and returned to his home in Wakefield for further recovery. In his blog, Kelner noted that it would be early 2014 until he could fully "return to professional life". He resumed his column in The Racing Post (at first on a semi-regular basis) and BBC Radio 5 Live later announced his return to Fighting Talk on 2 November. By mid-January he had resumed his lunchtime programme on BBC Radio Leeds.

Preceded by Steve Bunce	BBC Radio 5 Live; Fighting Talk Champion of Champions; 2012/13	Succeeded by Justin Moorhouse
