= Frank Gillard Awards =

Awards for BBC Local Radio stations

The Frank Gillard Awards are awards for BBC Local Radio stations in the UK. They are named after Frank Gillard who initiated the BBC's local radio network. The award is a head of Frank Gillard and is given as Gold, Silver and Bronze degrees.

The annual Frank Gillard Awards were launched in 2000 in memory of the war correspondent and founder of BBC Local Radio. Their aim is to recognise achievements and encourage excellence in the programming at BBC Local Radio stations across England.

== Categories ==
Not all categories are awarded each year.

- The Breakfast Programme
- Programme Presenter
- Coverage of a New Story
- Interactive Programme
- Reporter
- Sports Coverage
- Social Action Campaign
- Radio Feature
- Outside Broadcast
- Religious Programming
- Radio Promotion
- Sense of Place
- Diversity
- Outstanding Contribution to BBC Local Radio
- Station of the Year
- Best Multi Media Treatment
