= Andrew Peach =

British radio presenter and newsreader

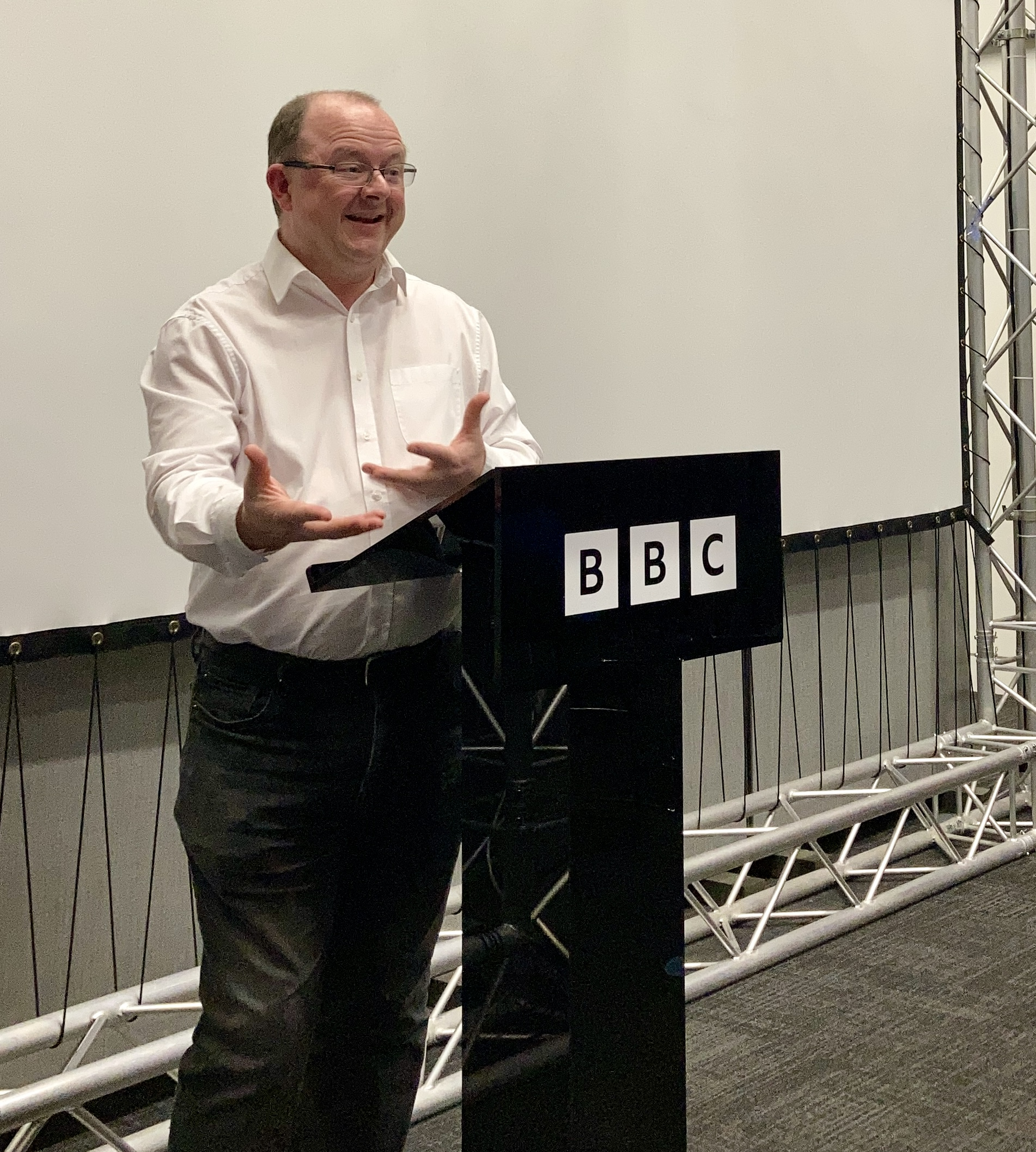
- Born: 1972 or 1973 (age 52–53); Walsall, West Midlands
- Education: St Edmund Hall, Oxford
- Occupations: Broadcaster and Event host
- Years active: 1992–present
- Employer(s): BBC Radio 2, BBC Radio 3, BBC Radio 4, BBC Radio Berkshire, BBC World Service, BFBS, LBC News

Andrew Peach (born 1972 or 1973) is a broadcaster and conference moderator in the United Kingdom.

He presents programmes on BBC Radio 4 such as Pick of the Week and the Six O'Clock News and is a regular guest on The Archers Podcast. He is an occasional presenter of Breakfast on BBC Radio 3. On BBC World Service he hosts news programmes including Newshour, World Business Report and the Global News Podcast. He is the longest serving newsreader on BBC Radio 2. He hosts events for organisations including the University of Oxford and Thames Valley Chamber of Commerce.

Peach has been nominated for 18 Radio Academy Awards, winning gold at the Audio and Radio Industry Awards in 2021. The judges described him as “an assured host, balancing great seriousness and warmth and displaying a strong bond with the audience” and “empathetic and probing, formulating questions that are short, to the point and perfectly timed”.

Peach celebrated 30 years on BBC Radio on 10 October 2022.

== Life ==
Andrew Peach was born in Bloxwich and educated at Queen Mary's Grammar School in Walsall and St Edmund Hall, Oxford.

== Career ==
Peach had an early experience of radio when he won a competition on BBC Radio WM in 1989. His prize was to travel to Germany and compile reports about life in Bonn and Cologne. His career started at BBC Radio Oxford in 1991. He joined BBC Radio Berkshire in 1992 and presented Saturday Breakfast on both stations from October that year.

Peach joined BBC Radio 2 in 1998. He was the regular news voice on The Chris Evans Show from 2005–2009.

Peach hosted Sunday mornings on BBC Radio WM from 2008–2011.

He presented news and phone-in programmes on BBC Radio 5 Live from 2010–2012.

Peach presented Saturday PM on BBC Radio 4 from 2014–2017.

As well as winning gold for Best Local Radio Show at the 2021 Audio and Radio Industry Awards, Peach was nominated as Best Speech Breakfast Presenter in the 2018 ARIAs and UK Speech Broadcaster of the Year in the 2010 Sony Radio Academy Awards.

Peach's work was reviewed by The Guardian in April 2010. His interview with the Archbishop of Canterbury in November 2010 was widely reported.

Major broadcasts have included the US Presidential Election from Washington, D.C. in November 2004, Pope Benedict XVI's visit to the United Kingdom in September 2010 and the Wedding of Prince William and Catherine Middleton at Westminster Abbey in April 2011. Peach has presented BBC coverage of all UK General Elections since 2001 and hosted the results of the 2016 United Kingdom European Union membership referendum on BBC World Service.

On 10 October 2017, Peach received an on-air message of congratulations from then Prime Minister Theresa May.

Peach hosted the rolling BBC World Service coverage of the January 6 United States Capitol attack in 2021, the Death and state funeral of Elizabeth II in September 2022 and the Fall of the Assad regime in Syria in December 2024.

Peach currently presents programmes such as the Six O'Clock News and Pick of the Week on BBC Radio 4. He presents Breakfast on BBC Radio 3. On the BBC World Service, Peach hosts Newshour, World Business Report, BBC OS, the Global News Podcast, Newsday and The Newsroom. Peach is also a news presenter on BBC Radio 2, BFBS and LBC News.

On 1 December 2023, he announced he would be leaving BBC Radio Berkshire after 31 years.

On 31 December 2025, Peach joined BBC Radio 3.
