= BBC Radio Berkshire =

Coordinates: 51°28′50.52″N 0°57′26.98″W

- Reading; England
- Broadcast area: Berkshire
- Frequencies: FM: 94.6 MHz (Henley and Marlow); FM: 95.4 MHz (Slough, Maidenhead, Windsor and East Berkshire); FM: 104.1 MHz (Basingstoke, Andover, and West Berkshire); FM: 104.4 MHz (Reading); DAB: 12D; Freeview: 711
- RDS: BBCBERKS

Programming
- Language: English
- Format: Local news, talk and music

Ownership
- Owner: BBC Local Radio, BBC South, BBC London

History
- First air date: 21 January 1992
- Former names: BBC Thames Valley FM (1996–2000)

Technical information
- Licensing authority: Ofcom

Links
- Website: www.bbc.co.uk/radioberkshire/

BBC Radio Berkshire is the BBC's local radio station serving the county of Berkshire. It broadcasts on FM, DAB, digital TV and via BBC Sounds.

According to RAJAR, the station has a weekly audience of 48,000 listeners as of May 2025.

It has studios at Thames Valley Park near Reading.

== History ==
BBC Radio Berkshire was launched on 21 January 1992 as a part-time station, broadcasting for part of the weekday, and on weekend mornings, with BBC Radio Oxford carried at all other times. Due to financial cutbacks, BBC Director-General John Birt announced that the station was to fully merge with BBC Radio Oxford on 9 April 1996 to become BBC Thames Valley FM. On 14 February 2000, the two stations became separate once again.

In November 2018, BBC Radio Berkshire moved from Caversham Park House – which the station shared with BBC Monitoring – to new purpose-built studios at Thames Valley Park on the outskirts of Reading.

== Awards ==
BBC Radio Berkshire was named Station of the Year in the 2012 Frank Gillard Awards, also winning in the Sports Coverage category for its coverage of Olympic rowing at Eton Dorney. Andrew Peach won silver in both the Programme Presenter and The Ultimate Hot Seat categories.

In the 2013 Sony Radio Academy Awards, the Andrew Peach programme won bronze in the category Breakfast Show of the Year (under 10 million).

The Andrew Peach Show was named Best Local Radio Show in the UK at the 2021 Radio Academy ARIA Awards.

== Technical ==
The Hannington transmitter for BBC Radio Berkshire's 104.1 FM frequency is located on Cottington Hill (close to Watership Down). The 104.1 FM signal can be heard over most of Hampshire, certainly more than BBC Radio Solent. The 104.4 FM signal comes from the Fountain House transmitter in Reading. The 94.6 FM signal comes from the Henley-on-Thames transmitter. The 95.4 FM signal comes from the Windsor transmitter.

Since 31 July 2004, DAB broadcasts have come from the NOW Digital Berkshire & North Hampshire 12D multiplex from Coppid Beech (at the junction of the B3408 and A329(M) in west Bracknell), Hannington and Hemdean (just north of Caversham). The Basingstoke DAB transmitter (between Cliddesden and Winslade near the A339 in Hampshire) was added on 3 October 2005.

Since June 2016, the station has been available on Freeview TV channel 711 in the BBC South and BBC London regions. It also streams online via BBC Sounds.

== Programming ==
Local programming is produced and broadcast from the BBC's Reading studios from 6 am to 10 pm on Sundays to Fridays and from 6 am to 6 pm and 8 pm to 10 pm on Saturdays.

Some off-peak programming originates from BBC Radio Solent in Southampton. The station usually broadcasts the whole of the Late Night programme, a programme carried by all BBC local radio stations (except in the case of sports coverage), which is broadcast between 10pm and 1am.

During the station's downtime, BBC Radio Berkshire simulcasts overnight programming from BBC Radio 5 Live

== Presenters ==
- Kirsten O'Brien
- Rich Clarke
