= Timeline of Magic =

History of the English radio network

A timeline of notable events relating to Magic 105.4, a commercial radio station operated by Bauer Radio, and the former Magic Network broadcast on AM stations in the north of England.

== 1990s ==
- 1990
  - 9 July – Melody Radio launches as an easy listening music service in London.
  - 17 July – Magic 828 launches as a MW oldies station in Leeds.
- 1997
  - February – Emap launches a network of Magic stations on its MW frequencies across the north of England. Playing soft adult contemporary music, they replace regional oldies stations Great North Radio and Great Yorkshire Gold. Magic 1161 and Magic 990, 1305 & 1548 launch on the 12th, followed one week later by the north east stations Magic 1152 and Magic 1170
  - 17 March – The Magic brand is rolled out across the north west.
- 1998
  - June – Emap purchases Melody 105.4 FM.
  - December – Melody Radio is renamed Magic 105.4 FM.
- 1999
  - No events.

== 2000s ==
- 2000
  - No events.
- 2001
  - 13 September – Magic launches a spin-off television channel.
  - December – EMAP decides that it is more economical for north of England Magic stations to share off-peak programmes and begins networking with the London station Magic 105.4 between 10am-2pm, and 7pm-6am, although there are local commercial breaks, and local news on the hour. During these hours the station is simply known as Magic.
- 2002
  - No events.
- 2003
  - January – Due to a sharp decline in listening, Emap ends the networking of London station Magic 105.4 on the north of England Magic stations and a regional northern network is created with programmes broadcast from Magic 1152 in Newcastle. During networked hours, local adverts are aired, as well as local news on the hour.
  - September –
    - Live evening programmes on Magic 105.4 are replaced by automated output.
    - Richard Skinner leaves and is replaced by Gary Vincent. Skinner had been mid-morning presenter for Magic since 1997.
- 2004
  - No events.
- 2005
  - 12 September – Neil Fox joins Magic 105.4 as the station's breakfast presenter.
- 2006
  - July – The Magic AM network is revamped to appeal to an older audience. The changes see the introduction of more networking with only the 4 hour breakfast show remaining local. As part of the revamp, Dave Lee Travis and Eamonn Holmes join the station to present weekend shows.
- 2007
  - September – After several years with the station, many of them on breakfast, Graham Dene leaves Magic 105.4. He is replaced as drivetime host by Steve Priestley.
- 2008
  - 29 January – Bauer completes the purchase of EMAPs radio, television and consumer media businesses, purchasing the assets for £1.14bn.
  - September – Singer Kim Wilde joins the station to present a Sunday lunchtime show.
- 2009
  - Steve Priestley leaves.

== 2010s ==
- 2010
  - 9 January – Boyzone singer Ronan Keating joins the station to present a Sunday afternoon show.
- 2011
  - No events.
- 2012
  - 23 March – Tony Blackburn and Mike Read are signed to appear on Magic Network.
  - April – The weekend breakfast show on the north of England Magic Network stations stops being a local show and is replaced by a networked programme. Consequently, only the weekday breakfast show remains locally produced.
  - 16 November – Magic Network presenter Dave Lee Travis is taken off air with immediate effect after he was arrested as part of an investigation into sexual offences.
- 2013
  - 15 April – Bauer increases networking on its Yorkshire Magic stations with a networked breakfast show coming from Magic 828 in Leeds. The other local Magic breakfast shows become regional programmes at around the same time.
  - August – Richard Skinner rejoins the station to provide cover for holidaying presenters. He continues in this role throughout 2014.
- 2014
  - 30 September – Neil Fox presents Magic 105.4's breakfast show for the final time. since Fox was arrested at the Magic 105.4 Studios on sex assault charges.
  - 27 October – Richard Allinson joins Magic 105.4 to present the drivetime show.
- 2015
  - 5 January –
    - Magic 105.4 launches nationally on Digital One.
    - The north of England Magic Network stations are rebranded as Bauer City 2.
  - January–March – Christine Bleakley presents an hour-long Sunday afternoon programme called Sunday Lunch.
- 2016
  - March - Lynn Parsons joins.
  - 15 March – Mellow Magic begins broadcasting, and Fran Godfrey joins.
  - 28 March – Magic Chilled begins broadcasting.
  - 16 April – Mel Giedroyc joins the station to present the Saturday lunchtime show.
  - Spring – Magic broadcasts a temporary pop-up service called Magic ABBA, run as a commercial partnership with Mamma Mia!: the Musical
  - Following the ending of Magic Abba, ‘’Magic Summer Soul’’ is launched. Initially intended as another short-term pop-up, the station becomes permanent in the autumn and is renamed Magic Soul.
  - October – Tom Price joins the station to present the weekend afternoon show, replacing Martin Collins who leaves after seven years of broadcasting at Magic 105.4.
- 2017
  - Alan Dedicoat joins Mellow Magic
  - April – The station sound is repositioned to play more 80s and 90s along with a new tag line "More of the songs you love."
  - September – Ronan Keating and Harriet Scott become presenters of the breakfast show. Other changes see Tom Price replaces Harriet as weekend breakfast presenter and Matt Brown take over weekend afternoons.
- 2018
  - 30 November – The station flips to a format of 100% Christmas music. Previously, its sister station Magic Soul would change to a Christmas music only playlist but this year its main station flipped. This is the first time a major UK radio station has done so. Bauer says listeners can expect "festive editorial content and a selection of much-loved Christmas pop hits from the last fifty years".
- 2019
  - 21 November – Bauer launches Magic at the Musicals on DAB+ in and around London. Presenters include Ruthie Henshall and Jonathan Bailey.

== 2020s ==
- 2020
  - 31 August – Magic Radio begins broadcasting on MW in East Yorkshire, Hull and North Lincolnshire.
- 2021
  - 30 April – Magic Radio stops broadcasting on MW across East Yorkshire and North Lincolnshire following the switching off of the Goxhill transmitter.
- 2022
  - No events.
- 2023
  - Autumn – Mellow Magic will move to the DAB+ format, and will start broadcasting in stereo. This gives Bauer the space on the SDL multiplex to bring seven more stations via the semi-national SDL multiplex, of which three will be other Magic spin-offs - Magic Chilled, Magic Soul, and Magic at the Musicals.
  - 9 October – Schedule changes at Magic Radio include new drivetime presenters, with Tom Price and Kat Shoob taking over the show from Simon Phillips, while Neev Spencer joins to present afternoons.
  - 13 October – Singer Lemar joins Magic for seven weeks to present a Friday evening show.
  - 14 October – Angellica Bell joins Magic to present Saturday breakfast, while Nicole Appleton joins to present a weekend afternoon show from 4pm to 7pm.
  - 16 October – Magic's four spin-off stations - Magic at the Musicals, Magic Chilled, Magic Soul and Mellow Magic - launch on the semi-national SDL multiplex. Magic's flagship station continues to broadcast on the Digital One multiplex.
  - 13 December – Magic is removed from Sky and Virgin Media TV platforms.
- 2024
  - 2 April – Magic stops broadcasting on the Freeview TV platform.
  - 16 September – Magic Classical replaces Scala Radio and Magic Chilled becomes Hits Radio Chilled.
- 2025
  - 31 March – Magic Radio begins broadcasting via DAB+, and in stereo.
