= Timeline of Greatest Hits Radio =

UK commercial radio station

This is a timeline of notable events relating to Greatest Hits Radio, a British commercial radio station operated by Bauer Radio. The timeline also covers the Magic and Big City 2 networks, which were the forerunners to Greatest Hits Radio.

== 1990s ==
- 1990
  - 9 July – Melody Radio launches as an easy listening music service in London.
  - 17 July – Magic 828 launches as a MW oldies station in Leeds.
- 1997
  - February – Emap launches a network of Magic stations on its MW frequencies across the north of England. Playing soft adult contemporary music, they replace regional oldies stations Great North Radio and Great Yorkshire Gold. Magic 1161 and Magic 990, 1305 & 1548 launch on the 12th, followed one week later by the north east stations Magic 1152 and Magic 1170
  - 17 March – The Magic brand is rolled out across the North West.
- 1998
  - June – Emap purchases Melody 105.4 FM.
  - December – Melody Radio is renamed Magic 105.4 FM.
- 1999
  - No events.

== 2000s ==
- 2000
  - No events.
- 2001
  - December – EMAP decides that it is more economical for north of England Magic stations to share off-peak programmes and begins networking with the London station Magic 105.4 between 10am-2pm, and 7pm-6am, although there are local commercial breaks, and local news on the hour. During these hours, the station is simply known as Magic.
- 2002
  - No events.
- 2003
  - January – Due to a sharp decline in listening, Emap ends the networking of London station Magic 105.4 on the north of England Magic stations and a regional northern network is created with programmes broadcast from Magic 1152 in Newcastle. During networked hours, local adverts are aired, as well as local news on the hour.
  - September – Live evening programmes on Magic 105.4 are replaced by automated output.
- 2004
  - No events.
- 2005
  - June – Emap acquires Scottish Radio Holdings, gaining control of a suite of AM/FM stations in Scotland including Clyde 2, Forth 2, Tay AM, Moray Firth Radio, West Sound and Northsound 2, plus regional stations including Vibe FM (rebranded to Kiss in 2006) in the East of England and the Severn Estuary, and Wave 105 on the South coast.
- 2006
  - July – The Magic AM network is revamped to appeal to an older audience. The changes see the introduction of more networking with only the 4 hour breakfast show remaining local.
- 2007
  - No events.
- 2008
  - 29 January – Bauer completes the purchase of EMAPs radio, television and consumer media businesses, purchasing the assets for £1.14bn.
- 2009
  - 4 June – Local programming on AM stations in Scotland is dropped outside of weekday breakfast and specialist shows are introduced.

== 2010s ==
- 2010
  - No events.
- 2011
  - No events.
- 2012
  - April – The weekend breakfast show on the north of England Magic Network stations stops being a local show and is replaced by a networked programme. Consequently, only the weekday breakfast show remains locally produced.
- 2013
  - 15 April – Bauer increases networking on its Yorkshire Magic stations with a networked breakfast show coming from Magic 828 in Leeds. The other local Magic breakfast shows become regional programmes at around the same time.
  - 1 July – The remaining Scottish local output ceased, leading to a fully networked schedule known as Greatest Hits Network, though this title was rarely used on-air as the local stations retained split local branding for a further ten years.
- 2014
  - September – Bauer Radio announces it would rebrand the Magic stations under localised identities, based on the main FM station names (e.g. Magic 1152 in Manchester becomes Key 2, based on Key 103). Magic's AM network closed with the London equivalent, Magic 105.4 FM, launching nationwide on DAB.
- 2015
  - 5 January – The north of England Magic Network stations relaunch with the local identities and collectively form the Bauer City 2 network. The Scottish MW stations continue as The Greatest Hits Network but network a version of the City 2 schedule with some peak time opt-outs specific for Scotland.
  - 7 December – Following permission from the regulator, Bauer swaps Radio City 2's format and frequencies with that of Radio City Talk. This gives City Network 2 its first berth on FM in England.
- 2016
  - Additional split programming for Scotland and England is reintroduced.
- 2017
  - No events.
- 2018
  - 3 April – Northsound 2 stops broadcasting on 1035 AM and becomes a digital-only station on DAB and online. It is the first commercial radio station in Scotland and the first of Bauer's local stations to cease analogue broadcasting in favour of a digital switchover.
  - 4 June – Following the renaming of Manchester station Key 103 to Hits Radio, Key 2 is renamed Key Radio.
- 2019
  - 7 January
    - Greatest Hits Radio replaces the Bauer City 2 branding. Individual station identities in Northern England are dropped and are rebranded to GHR with Scotland unaffected. The new network extends to the West Midlands although GHR West Midlands continues to air a weekday three-hour local show.
    - Mark Goodier joins.
  - 23 February – Pat Sharp joins.

== 2020s ==
- 2020
  - 10 February – Alex Lester joins.
  - 15 February – Janice Long and Paul Gambaccini join.
  - 27 May – Bauer announces that the majority of the stations it acquired from UKRD, Lincs, Wireless and Celador will be joining the Greatest Hits Radio network from September, clustered to provide regional programming outside of network hours. Four of the acquired stations will join the Hits Radio network, retaining local names and a daily breakfast show, and three stations – Lincs FM, Pirate FM and SAM FM Bristol – will continue as largely standalone stations.
  - 2 June – Greatest Hits Radio UK replaces Heat Radio on Freeview 716.
  - 13 July – The former Wireless Group and Celador-owned stations join the Greatest Hits Radio network. The nineteen stations carry local breakfast shows and voicetracked programming whilst retaining separate branding until the full relaunch on 1 September 2020.
  - 31 August – Bauer closes Leeds station Radio Aire after 39 years on air. Its frequency is, from the following day, used to carry Greatest Hits Radio.
  - 1 September – The majority of the stations that Bauer Media acquired the previous year from UKRD, Lincs FM Group, Wireless Group and Celador Radio. join Greatest Hits Radio, clustered to provide regional programming outside of network hours, consisting of three hours each weekday teatime. All of the affected stations lose their individual station names.
  - 6 September – Simon Mayo joins.
  - 1 November – Following its purchase of Radio Plymouth, Bauer closes the station and uses the frequency to relay Greatest Hits Radio South West.
  - 16 November – Following Bauer's purchase of The Revolution, the east Manchester station is closed and its frequency transferred to Greatest Hits Radio, thereby giving Greatest Hits Radio Manchester its first berth on FM.
- 2021
  - 4 January – Debbie Mac joins.
  - 9 January – Jenny Powell joins.
  - 15 March – The weekday three-hour regional programme is moved from Drivetime to early afternoon to allow the station to network a new Drivetime programme hosted by Simon Mayo, and it features the return of Matt Williams as well as the return of the zoo format.
  - 26 April – Bauer switches off its mediumwave frequencies in Lancashire, Greater Manchester, Leeds and Humberside. They are switched off following the launch of Greatest Hits Radio on FM in those areas.
  - 17 May – Greatest Hits Radio launches on FM in London. It is able to do so by broadcasting on the frequency that carried Absolute Radio. Bauer is able to make the change following permission from Ofcom to swap Absolute Radio with Greatest Hits Radio.
  - 17 June – Bauer purchases Stockport-based Imagine FM and announces it will add the three licenses it purchases to the Greatest Hits Radio network, further expanding GHR's coverage of both the Greater Manchester environs and into north Derbyshire (where GHR already occupies the former Peak FM).
  - 1 September – Imagine FM rebrands as Greatest Hits Radio.
  - 11 December – Janice Long presents her last show before her death 14 days later.
  - 23 December – Darren Proctor hosts his final show as he leaves the station.
- 2022
  - 4 January – Jackie Brambles joins, and returns to radio broadcasting after 27 years away.
  - 8 January – Alex Lester replaces Janice Long on Saturday afternoons, and Jo Russell replaces Darren Proctor on Saturday nights.
  - 26 February – Richard Allinson and Kate Thornton both join the station as Richard replaces Janice Long on Saturday afternoons and Kate now replaces Darren Proctor on Saturday nights.
  - 19 September
    - Wave 105's Poole transmitter relays Greatest Hits Radio Dorset, with Wave 105 remaining on its main transmitter.
    - Greatest Hits Radio is removed from frequencies in Southern England, Suffolk and East Yorkshire, while Hits Radio disappears in Hampshire, as Nation Broadcasting ends its franchising agreement with Bauer Media.
  - 14 December – Greatest Hits Radio launches on Sky TV, replacing Scala Radio on the TV platform.
- 2023
  - January – Signal 1's Stafford and Congleton transmitters switch to broadcasting Greatest Hits Radio, with Signal 1 continuing to broadcast to Stoke-on-Trent.
  - 1 March – Bauer announces plans to replace Kiss with Greatest Hits Radio on its FM frequencies in Cambridge, Peterborough and Suffolk, subject to Ofcom approval.
  - 20 March – Bauer launches a regional Greatest Hits Radio service for Cambridge, Peterborough and Suffolk on DAB ahead of proposed changes to its FM frequencies in the area.
  - 2 April – Local English language programming is broadcast on Greatest Hits Radio South Wales for the final time. Its late-night programme in Welsh is retained along with the required local news, weather and advertising.
  - 3 April
    - Ken Bruce joins the station to present the weekday mid-morning show.
    - Bauer Radio rebrands Clyde 2, Forth 2, MFR 2, Northsound 2, Tay 2, West Sound in Ayrshire, and West Sound in Dumfries & Galloway as Greatest Hits Radio, bringing its Scottish stations under the Greatest Hits banner alongside those in England and Wales.
    - CFM and Radio Borders are rebranded as Greatest Hits Radio.
    - Bauer replaces Lincs FM with Greatest Hits Radio Lincolnshire on 102.2FM, 96.7FM and 97.6FM, while Lincs FM continues to air on DAB.
  - 8 April – Mark Goodier begins presenting weekend mid-mornings on Greatest Hits Radio, replacing Pat Sharp.
  - 18 July – Ofcom launches an investigation into Greatest Hits Radio's reporting of a petition urging criminals to be required to appear in court for sentencing hearings. The Face the Family petition was promoted by several Bauer stations, and was the lead story during Ken Bruce's show on 13 April 2023. Ofcom will examine whether Greatest Hits Radio's reporting of the story was impartial and accurate.
  - 4 September – Greatest Hits Radio launches local radio services for Kent and Northern Ireland.
  - 2 October – Gem 106's FM frequency switches over to Greatest Hits Radio while Gem continues to broadcast on DAB.
  - 30 October
    - Bauer launches Greatest Hits Radio and Hits Radio in Oxfordshire, replacing Jack FM.
    - A localised version of GHR launches on DAB in Northamptonshire, this and the Oxford change ending carriage of the network Greatest Hits Radio UK on DAB, the UK-wide service continues on national platforms such as Freeview and satellite TV.
  - 12 November – Bauer announces that GHR's remaining mediumwave transmissions, in Scotland and Northern England, will end by the end of the year, with the station continuing on DAB in the affected areas.
  - 13 December – Bauer removes all of its radio stations, including Greatest Hits Radio, from the Sky and Virgin Media TV platforms.
- 2024
  - 20 February – Greatest Hits Radio announces its first Greatest Hits Radio cruise in association with Ambassador Cruise Line, which will take passengers on a cruise from London to Hamburg along the River Elbe in October, and feature regular presenters Ken Bruce, Martin Kemp, Jenny Powell and Kate Thornton.
  - 27 February – Bauer announces plans to rebrand Wave 105 as Greatest Hits Radio South Coast and Pirate FM as Greatest Hits Radio Cornwall.
  - 2 April – Greatest Hits Radio is to be withdrawn, along with six other Bauer stations, from broadcasting over the Freeview TV platform, a change which was announced in mid-March, although no longer broadcast on linear TV, GHR will remain available on connected-TV streaming apps as well as FM/DAB.
  - 16 September – Bauer launches Greatest Hits Radio's first decades station with Greatest Hits Radio 60s.
  - 27 September – Bauer ends its local Greatest Hits Radio programming for Cumbria as its offices in Carlisle are closed.
  - 1 November – Greatest Hits Radio becomes fully networked when the regional weekday afternoon programmes are replaced with a networked show presented by Andy Gould until 8 November, with regular presenter Kate Thornton taking over from 11 November.
  - 20 December – Rick Jackson presents the final Greatest Hits Radio regional breakfast show on Greatest Hits Radio South. Shortly afterwards, BBC Radio Solent announces he will present their afternoon show in the new year.
  - 23 December – Greatest Hits Radio South begins simulcasting Greatest Hits Radio's national breakfast show.
- 2025
  - Claire Sturgess joins, and replaces Kate Thornton on Saturday afternoons.
  - 31 March – Greatest Hits Radio 70s and Greatest Hits Radio 80s launch.
- 2026
  - 7 September – Zoe Ball joins Greatest Hits Radio to present weekday afternoons, taking on the show previously presented by Kate Thornton.
