= 1989 in British radio =

This is a list of events in British radio during 1989.

== Events ==
=== January ===
- 1 January – London "pirate" radio presenter Sammy Jacob, known as DJ Sammy Jay, sets up part-time "pirate" indie music station Q102, predecessor of Radio X.
- 15 January – Pick of the Pops is revived by BBC Radio 1. The show takes on a new classic hits format and features three past charts from three different decades each week. Alan Freeman returns to Radio 1 to present the programme.

=== February ===
- No events.

=== March ===
- 10 March – Les Ross presents the BRMB breakfast show for the final time ahead of his move to BRMB's forthcoming classic hits service Xtra AM. He had presented the programme for thirteen years.

=== April ===
- 1 April – BBC Radio 1 starts broadcasting slightly earlier each morning and is now on air between 5 am and 2 am seven days a week.

=== May ===
- Undated in May
  - The BBC Night Network is launched on the BBC's six local radio stations in Yorkshire and north east England. It provides all six stations with a daily evening service, thereby keeping the stations on air with regional programming until midnight. All local evening programming – mainly local sport and programming for ethnic minorities – is broadcast as an opt-out but is aired only on the station's AM frequencies.
  - In a down-the-line interview with James Naughtie recorded for BBC Radio 4's World at One programme, Leader of the Labour Party Neil Kinnock loses his temper, exclaiming "I'm not going to be bloody kebabbed"; the interview is not broadcast at the time but is leaked to the media.
- 1 May – Classic Gold launches on the MW transmitters of Pennine Radio, Viking Radio and Radio Hallam.
- 26 May – BBC Radio 4 airs the 10,000th episode of The Archers.

=== June ===
- No events.

=== July ===
- 3 July – Simon Bates and producer Jonathan Ruffle set off on an 80-day circumnavigation of the world to raise money for Oxfam. Their progress is charted on BBC Radio 1 in a broadcast each weekday morning.
- 4 July – A new transmitter for DevonAir is switched on allowing the station to expand its transmission area to East Devon, West Dorset and South Somerset. The relay broadcasts under the name of South West 103.

=== August ===
- 19 August – United Kingdom and Netherlands radio regulatory authorities conduct an armed raid on offshore pirate radio station Radio Caroline in which equipment is disabled or confiscated, taking it off the air until 1 October.

=== September ===
- 1 September – The Ireland-based long wave station Atlantic 252 is launched. Operated by RTÉ it broadcasts to both Ireland and the United Kingdom. The first presenter to be heard is Gary King who announces at 8 am: "Mine is the first voice you will ever hear on Atlantic 252." The station broadcasts only during the day – between 6 am and 7 pm – and at closedown invites listeners to tune in to Radio Luxembourg.

=== October ===
- 1 October – BBC Radio 2 begins a series of Sunday afternoon performances of works by Gilbert and Sullivan. The 12-week series, which runs until Christmas, replaces the station's usual Sunday afternoon schedule.
- 2 October – LBC is replaced on FM by news and comment station LBC Crown FM.
- 19 October – Home Secretary Douglas Hurd issues a notice under clause 13(4) of the BBC Licence and Agreement to the BBC and under section 29(3) of the Broadcasting Act 1981 to the IBA prohibiting the broadcast of direct statements by representatives or supporters of 11 Irish political and military organisations. The prohibition lasts until 1994 and denies the UK news media the right to broadcast the voices, though not the words, of all Irish republican and Loyalist paramilitaries. The restrictions, targeted primarily at Sinn Féin, means that actors are used to speak the words of any representative interviewed for radio and television.
- 22 October – The first of the Independent Broadcasting Authority's series of incremental radio stations launches when Sunset 102 begins broadcasting to Manchester. More than 20 licences will be issued, allowing new stations to start broadcasting in areas already served by independent local radio. The stations come on air in 1989 and 1990.

=== November ===
- 13 November – London Greek Radio and WNK become the first stations in the UK to share a frequency. They alternate every four hours.

=== December ===
- 19 December – BBC Radio 1 starts transmitting on 98.8 MHz across the whole of London and south-east England from Wrotham, replacing the temporary London transmitter from Crystal Palace which broadcast on 104.8 MHz. The BBC Radio 1 network also expands to East Anglia and the Cardigan Bay area.
- 30 December – BBC Radio 1 uses BBC Radio 2's shared FM frequencies on a Saturday afternoon for the final time.

=== Unknown ===
- City Talk 1548 AM in Liverpool becomes the UK's first all-talk radio station outside of London. The station broadcasts as an opt-out between the hours of 0700 and 1900 on weekdays, sharing content with Radio City's FM service outside these times. This approach differs from that taken by many other stations, which have begun launching "oldies" format stations on their former AM frequencies.
- Radio Luxembourg launches a daytime schedule in English for the first time, the first since the early 1950s. It broadcasts the new 24-hour stereo schedule on the recently launched Astra 1A satellite to supplement the 208 analogue night-time service.
- Southern Sound's broadcast area is expanded when it obtains the licence for Eastbourne and Hastings in East Sussex on 97.5 MHz.
- WM Heartlands launches as a mid-morning experimental opt-out from BBC Radio WM. It serves the 'Heartlands' area of East Birmingham using the station's 1458MW frequency.

== Station debuts ==
- 15 January – WABC
- 14 February – BBC Hereford and Worcester
- 4 March – BBC Wiltshire Sound
- 27 March – Coast AM
- 31 March –
  - MFM 97.1
  - Marcher Gold
- 4 April – Xtra AM (1989–1998)
- 8 April – Great North Radio (1989–1997)
- 1 May – Classic Gold
- 16 July – The Breeze
- 1 September – Atlantic 252 (1989–2002)
- 15 September – Fox FM
- 2 October – LBC Crown FM and London Newstalk
- 15 October – Horizon Radio
- 22 October – Sunset 102 (1989–1993)
- 5 November – Sunrise Radio
- 13 November – London Greek Radio and WNK
- 26 November – Orchard FM
- 2 December – CNFM
- 9 December – Sunrise Radio Yorkshire
- Unknown – City Talk (1989–1991)

== Programme debuts ==
- 20 January – An Actor's Life For Me on BBC Radio 2 (1989–1993)
- March – The Mary Whitehouse Experience on BBC Radio 1 (1989–1990)
- 26 April – Winston (Peter Tinniswood) on BBC Radio 4 (1988–1994)
- 5 November – Sherlock Holmes on BBC Radio 4 (1989–1998)

== Continuing radio programmes ==
=== 1940s ===
- Sunday Half Hour (1940–2018)
- Desert Island Discs (1942–Present)
- Down Your Way (1946–1992)
- Letter from America (1946–2004)
- Woman's Hour (1946–Present)
- A Book at Bedtime (1949–Present)

=== 1950s ===
- The Archers (1950–Present)
- The Today Programme (1957–Present)
- Sing Something Simple (1959–2001)
- Your Hundred Best Tunes (1959–2007)

=== 1960s ===
- Farming Today (1960–Present)
- In Touch (1961–Present)
- The World at One (1965–Present)
- The Official Chart (1967–Present)
- Just a Minute (1967–Present)
- The Living World (1968–Present)
- The Organist Entertains (1969–2018)

=== 1970s ===
- PM (1970–Present)
- Start the Week (1970–Present)
- Week Ending (1970–1998)
- You and Yours (1970–Present)
- I'm Sorry I Haven't a Clue (1972–Present)
- Good Morning Scotland (1973–Present)
- Kaleidoscope (1973–1998)
- Newsbeat (1973–Present)
- The News Huddlines (1975–2001)
- File on 4 (1977–Present)
- Money Box (1977–Present)
- The News Quiz (1977–Present)
- Breakaway (1979–1998)
- Feedback (1979–Present)
- The Food Programme (1979–Present)
- Science in Action (1979–Present)

=== 1980s ===
- In Business (1983–Present)
- Sounds of the 60s (1983–Present)
- Loose Ends (1986–Present)
- Flying the Flag (1987–1992)
- Citizens (1987–1991)
- Top of the Pops (1988–1991)

== Ending this year ==
- 6 March – After Henry (1985–1989)

== Closing this year ==
- 1 May – Viking Gold (1988–1989)

== Births ==
- 20 January – Glenn Moore, newsreader and comedian
- 16 February – Yinka Bokinni, broadcast presenter
- 23 April – Laura Anderson, radio and television personality
- 13 May – Katie Thistleton, broadcast presenter
- 9 August – Jimmy Hill, radio and television presenter
- 25 September – Vick Hope, broadcast presenter

== Deaths ==
- 27 January – Arthur Marshall, 78, broadcaster and humorous writer
- 10 July – Tommy Trinder, 80, radio, stage and screen comedian
- 22 August – Lord Hill, 85, physician, medical and broadcast executive, politician and "The Radio Doctor"
- 22 October – Ewan MacColl, 74, folk singer-songwriter, actor and labour activist, co-creator of the radio ballad
- 28 October – Henry Hall, 91, bandleader
- 31 October – Roger Scott, 46, disc jockey
- 2 November – Tom Mennard, 71, comedian
- 16 December – Marjorie Westbury, 84, radio actress and soprano

== See also ==
- 1989 in British music
- 1989 in British television
- 1989 in the United Kingdom
- List of British films of 1989
