= Peter Grant (broadcaster) =

Radio presenter

- Born: Durham, England
- Spouse: Sarah Jane Grant
- Children: Sam Grant
- Presenting career
- Stations: BBC Radio Newcastle, BBC Radio Tees (until 2019), Radio Aire, Viking FM
- Style: former television and radio presenter, sports compere, media consultant and event host
- Country: United Kingdom

Peter Grant (died January 2025) was an English radio and television presenter, DJ and compere, best known for his work on BBC Radio Newcastle, BBC Radio Tees, TFM and Magic 1170.

== Personal life ==
Grant lived in Durham, England. In 2024, Grant married his wife Sarah Jane in Durham, England.

== Career ==
Grant started his broadcasting career in 1982 and continued until 2019. Grant was best known for his time at TFM and later Magic 1170 in the north east, Peter also spent time at Hallam FM in Sheffield, Durham FM, Radio Aire and later working for the BBC for BBC Radio Newcastle, BBC Radio Tees and BBC Radio Cumbria. Grant hosted television shows for Made In Tyne and Wear, was a sports compere for Gateshead FC and later Darlington FC. Grant presented weather and travel reports for BBC Look North in the North East and Cumbria region. Grant also had his own media company called Peter Grant Media. Alongside his work in radio, Grant worked as a Media Consultant within the drainage industry. Grant's son, Sam Grant, is a musician in the group Pigs Pigs Pigs Pigs Pigs Pigs Pigs.

== Illness and death ==
Grant was diagnosed with cancer in 2024 and underwent surgery. A month later, he posted on X that “those pesky cancer cells” had returned and he was having chemotherapy. Grant died in January 2025; colleagues, listeners, friends and family paid tribute on social media. Former BBC Radio Newcastle broadcaster Alfie Joey said: "Well this is sad. An old friend of mine from radioland has died. Peter Grant was great company and relentlessly positive. Even when he was given his cancer diagnosis last year he said he wasn't going to dwell on the negatives. What an amazing outlook to have and to learn from. Thoughts and love to his wife Sarah-Jane and family. And fond memories of some happy times together, on and off air. RIP Peter." Former BBC Look North news reader Colin Briggs said: "Dreadful, dreadful news. Great bloke Peter. Thoroughly enjoyed working alongside him. Proper pro at everything he did."
