= Pulse 2 =

England
- Broadcast area: Bradford, Kirklees and Calderdale
- Frequencies: MW: 1278, 1530 kHz; DAB: 11B

Programming
- Format: Classic hits

Ownership
- Owner: Bauer
- Sister stations: Pulse 1

Pulse 2 was an Independent Local Radio station serving Bradford, Kirklees and Calderdale areas from studios in Bradford, West Yorkshire, England.

The station was folded into Greatest Hits Radio West Yorkshire, as part of a rebrand, on 1 September 2020.

== Background ==
Pulse 2 logo used from 2009 to 2016

Final logo used from 2016 to 2020

The station was previously known as Pennine Radio, Classic Gold, Great Yorkshire Gold, Great Yorkshire Radio, 1278 and 1530 AM West Yorkshire, West Yorkshire's Big AM, Pennine's Big AM, West Yorkshire's Classic Gold and Pulse Classic Gold and under previous ownership was part of the Yorkshire Radio Network.

When, in 1989, Pennine Radio was split into Pennine FM and Classic Gold, the AM service became part of a network, initially with sister stations in Hull and Sheffield. In 1995, the Bradford-based radio station became a stand-alone operation owned by The Radio Partnership, which had purchased Pulse FM (now Pulse 1) for £4.6 million, though it continued to lease the name Great Yorkshire Gold. The brand lease ended in March 1997. However Emap had just announced plans to rebrand the Leeds, Hull and Sheffield stations as Magic, with a format of easy listening pop music. However The Radio Partnership decided that it wanted to continue offering a gold format so an agreement was formed with GWR to broadcast their Classic Gold. 75 per cent of the programmes would be supplied by GWR, with local programming coming from Bradford. However on-air promotions for Magic had already started to appear so to avoid any potential confusion amongst listeners, a temporary station called 1278 and 1530 AM West Yorkshire was created to fill the gap until the networking of Classic Gold could begin.

A couple of years later, Classic Gold was dropped in favour of becoming part of the BIG AM network with sister stations in Stoke and Manchester. Shortly after though, Classic Gold reappeared, simulcasting the GWR/UBC Classic Gold and latterly GCap Gold network with local afternoon programming for West Yorkshire remaining. However, on 1 December 2008 the station was re-launched as a fully local service for West Yorkshire and was one of the last legacy ILR AM stations in England to broadcast local programming.

== Station rebrand ==
On 8 February 2019, Pulse 2 and the Wireless Group's local radio stations were sold to Bauer Radio. The sale was ratified in March 2020 following an inquiry by the Competition and Markets Authority.

On 27 May 2020, it was announced that Pulse 2 would join Bauer's Greatest Hits Radio network.

On 13 July 2020, local programming outside weekday breakfast was replaced by networked output from the GHR network, with Pulse 2 retaining its own branding.

On 1 September 2020, the station rebranded as Greatest Hits Radio and merged with ten other stations in Yorkshire and Lincolnshire. The station's local breakfast show was replaced by a regional drivetime show. Localised news bulletins, traffic updates and advertising were retained.
