= The Radio Partnership =

UK media company

The Radio Partnership was a media company which operated radio stations in the UK.

== About ==
Initially, the Metro Radio Group which owned TFM, Metro FM and Great North Radio, bought Viking FM, Hallam FM, Pennine FM (later rebranded as The Pulse) and Classic Gold (later rebranded Great Yorkshire Radio, then Great Yorkshire Gold) was acquired by East Midland Allied Press in 1996. Ownership rules meant that because they owned Radio Aire in an overlapping area, one of the stations had to be sold, and that was The Pulse and its AM sister station which were purchased in a management buyout from senior staff and ex-Metro Group executives for £4.6m. Under the new company, called The Radio Partnership, became number one in the West Yorkshire radio market for the first time in its history.

The Radio Partnership expanded over the years to include other stations, such as Signal Radio in Stoke-on-Trent.

In 1999, Kelvin MacKenzie's Talk Radio UK bought The Radio Partnership and formed The Wireless Group to include the national broadcaster and a series of local stations. In July 2005, The Wireless Group was in turn acquired by UTV radio.

== Licence bid ==
The Radio Partnership was one of 14 applications to broadcast a regional station in the North East. Under the name The Point the group proposed a dance and alternative format for listeners aged 15-30. They were unsuccessful in their bid and the licence was won by Chrysalis Radio's Galaxy format.
