= Pulse Gold =

England
- Broadcast area: West Yorkshire
- Frequencies: 1278 and 1520 MW & DAB

Programming
- Format: Oldies

Ownership
- Owner: UTV Radio

History
- First air date: 16 September 1975

Pulse Gold was an Independent Local Radio station broadcasting from Bradford. It broadcast alongside sister station The Pulse Of West Yorkshire.

== History ==
The station was previously known as Pennine Radio, Classic Gold, Great Yorkshire Gold, Great Yorkshire Radio, 1278 and 1530 AM West Yorkshire, West Yorkshire's Big AM, Pennine's Big AM, and West Yorkshire's Classic Gold, and under previous ownership was part of the Yorkshire Radio Network.

It was then branded as Pulse Gold, and later relaunched as West Yorkshire's Pulse 2.

== Ownership ==
It was previously owned by The Radio Partnership, The Wireless Group, and now is operated by UTV Radio. Most programmes on Pulse Gold come from The Gold Network, which was formed in August 2007 following the merger of the Capital Gold and Classic Gold radio networks.

Aiming to deliver the widest breadth of music currently available anywhere else on commercial radio, Gold plays songs from the last five decades and offers a variety of specialist music shows, interviews, celebrity podcasts, guest DJs and gigs.

== Local Presenters ==
Local presenters on Pulse Gold included Elisa Hilton, Danny Lacey, Paul Fairclough & Colin Lowther as well as Tim Thornton and Ian Ormondroyd who were the commentary team for Pulse Gold Sport.

== See also ==
- The Pulse of West Yorkshire – sister station
