= 1991 in British radio =

This is a list of events in British radio during 1991.

== Events ==
- 1991 sees the first restricted service licences appear. Generally broadcasting for up to 28 days, the first to go on air is Ski FM, providing a service for skiers in the Scottish Highlands.

=== January ===
- 1 January – The Radio Authority comes into being, replacing the Independent Broadcasting Authority as the UK's independent radio regulator.
- 6 January – For the first time, BBC Radio 1's Sunday chart show plays all 40 tracks and the show is renamed as The Complete Top 40. The programme's length is extended, starting half an hour earlier at 4:30 pm.
- 7 January – Sue McGarry and Julian Worricker replace Martin Kelner as presenters of BBC Radio 5's drivetime show Five Aside.
- 11 January – The Essential Selection, presented by Pete Tong, debuts on BBC Radio 1. It replaces Jeff Young's Big Beat.
- 17 January
  - Radio 4 News FM, the first rolling BBC Radio news service, launches to provide live coverage of the first Gulf War. It uses BBC Radio 4's FM frequencies, whilst Radio 4's regular scheduled service continues on long wave. This service is also broadcast on BBC World Service. Some journalists choose to give it the nickname "Scud FM" from the Scud missiles used by Iraqi forces in the war.
  - BBC Radio 1 begins broadcasting a temporary 24-hour service in order to provide round-the-clock updates with the latest events in the Gulf War. It also broadcasts news bulletins every 30 minutes.
  - A list of songs banned by the BBC from airplay during the Gulf War – 67 in all – is adopted, mostly due to war references.
- 27 January – Following its purchase by the Chiltern Radio Group, Bristol station FTP is replaced by Galaxy Radio and becomes part of Chiltern Radio's Hot FM network. Local programmes are broadcast between 0600 and 2200 with the station taking the main network output overnight.

=== February ===
- Undated in February –
  - At the start of February, BBC Radio 1 ends its temporary overnight programming and once again closes down between 2 am and 5 am, although the half-hourly news bulletins continue to be broadcast for the full duration of the Gulf War.
  - Gilles Peterson is fired from Jazz FM after playing peace songs on-air and encouraging listeners to attend an anti-war march during the Gulf War.

=== March ===
- 2 March – The end of the Gulf War results in the closure, at 6pm, of Radio 4 News FM. Consequently, Radio 4's regular schedule returns to FM.
- Undated in March
  - After two years on air, Radio City (Liverpool) closes its MW talk station City Talk 1548 AM and replaces it with Radio City Gold.
  - BBC Radio Gwent closes after eight years on air. Consequently, BBC Radio Wales becomes available on FM for the first time, albeit only on the frequencies vacated by Radio Gwent's closure.
  - The first restricted service licence (RSL) for the Muslim community, Fast FM in Bradford, airs for the duration of Ramadan. Future years will see RSLs for Ramadan airing across the UK in areas with significant Muslim populations.
- 30 March – Radio 5 starts broadcasting its own programmes between 11pm and midnight, replacing an hour of programmes from the World Service. Consequently, the late evening slate of programmes originating from different parts of the country expands from 90 to 120 minutes.

=== April ===
- 4 April – BBC Radio 1 launches its first show dedicated to rap music. Presented by Pete Tong, the one-hour show, called The Rap Selection, is broadcast on Thursday evenings and lasts until March 1992.

=== May ===
- 1 May – BBC Radio 1 begins broadcasting a 24-hour service on a permanent basis, but only on FM – the station's MW frequencies are switched off each night between midnight and 6 am.
- Undated in May – The BBC Night Network is expanded to incorporate the BBC's four north west stations. Programmes start an hour later, at 7:05 pm. The north west stations have previously broadcast their own networked evening programming called Network North West.

=== June ===
- No events.

=== July ===
- 5 July – Chiltern Radio launches Network News.
- 25 July – The final episode of soap opera Citizens is broadcast on BBC Radio 4. The soap's final broadcast comes two days later with an omnibus edition of the week's episodes.
- Undated in July – The Radio Authority awards the first Independent National Radio licence to Showtime Radio, which proposes a 'songs from the shows' format. The rules, as set out by the Broadcasting Act 1990, state that the Authority has to give the licence to the highest cash bidder, providing that the applicant meets criteria set down in the Broadcasting Act and Showtime has offered the highest amount out of the three applicants.

=== August ===
- Undated in August – Showtime Radio is not able to secure the required funding within the required time as stipulated by the Radio Authority. Consequently, the offer of the first Independent National Radio licence to Showtime Radio is withdrawn.
- 5–30 August – Phil Collins, The Pet Shop Boys, Jason Donovan and Whitney Houston are Bates's Mates who deputise for Simon Bates on BBC Radio 1.
- 9 August – The spoof current affairs series On the Hour launches on BBC Radio 4, introducing inept sports reporter Alan Partridge, played by Steve Coogan.
- 24 August – Allied Radio plc is created when the Crawley-based Independent Local Radio station, Radio Mercury plc, merges with the Guildford-based ILR contractors, County Sound plc.
- 29 August – Top of the Pops is simulcast on Radio 1 for the last time; the simulcast ends two days before BBC television begins broadcasting in NICAM stereo.
- 30 August – At 5 am, Pennine FM is rebranded as The Pulse of West Yorkshire by new owners Metro Radio Group.

=== September ===
- 2 September – BBC Radio 5 launches a weekday lunchtime programme in conjunction with forces station BFBS. Called BFBS Worldwide, the programme continues to be broadcast until the demise of Radio 5 in 1994.
- 16 September
  - The main BBC Radio 4 service moves from long wave to FM as FM coverage has now been extended to cover almost all of the UK – Radio 4 does not become available on FM in much of Scotland and Wales until the start of the 1990s. Opt-outs are transferred to long wave, including The Daily Service which from this day is now broadcast only on long wave.
  - Woman's Hour moves from early afternoons to a mid-morning slot.
  - Signal buys neighbouring KFM and merges the station with Echo 96 resulting in the launch of Signal Cheshire.
- 30 September – The Radio Authority re-awards the first Independent National Radio licence to Classic FM.
- Undated in September – Atlantic 252 commences 24-hour transmission.

=== October ===
- 5 October – Football phone-in 6-0-6 is broadcast for the first time on BBC Radio 5. Danny Baker is the programme's host. The launch of this programme is part of an expansion of Radio 5's broadcast hours. Previously the station had simulcast the BBC's other radio stations at various off-peak times, including Saturday evenings.

=== November ===
- 18 November – Live presentation on Airport Information Radio ends in favour of a pre-recorded service after the station was bought by Allied Radio plc.
- 26 November – Piers Plowright's documentary Mr. B. is broadcast on BBC Radio.

=== December ===
- Undated in December – Radio Cracker, an interdenominational Christian youth radio project, sees 90 different stations broadcasting across the UK as restricted service licences in the run-up to Christmas. The Christmas Cracker initiative was set up by Richard Wood on behalf of Tearfund and the Oasis Trust to inform and educate people about the poverty and suffering of those living in Third World countries.
- 20 December – Derek Jameson leaves The Radio 2 Breakfast Show after presenting the programme for more than five years.
- 23 December – BBC Radio 2 airs Christmas in Albert Square, a special one hour programme presented by EastEnders actors Wendy Richard and Bill Treacher, who play some favourite festive music and swap anecdotes about the BBC1 soap.
- 25 December – Norma Major, the spouse of the Prime Minister of the United Kingdom, John Major, is a guest presenter on Radio 2, where she presents a programme playing some of her favourite seasonal music.
- 29 December – Listeners to Birmingham's BRMB station hear presenters Andy Hollins and Brendan Kearney storm out of the studio following an on-air row. The disagreement erupts during a live review of the year of the pair's regular Sunday morning show.
- 30 December – At 3 am, Radio Luxembourg ends MW transmissions after 54 years on air. The stations continues to broadcast via satellite.

=== Unknown ===
- BBC Radio Shropshire stops broadcasting on MW. One of the relinquished two frequencies – 756 kHz – is subsequently given over to commercial radio.
- WM Heartlands, a mid-morning experimental opt-out from BBC WM which served the 'Heartlands' area of East Birmingham using the station's 1458MW frequency, closes after two years on air.

== Station debuts ==
- 17 January – Radio 4 News FM
- 10 March – South Coast Radio
- March – Radio City Gold
- 30 August – The Pulse of West Yorkshire
- 19 October – SIBC
- 14 November – BBC Radio Surrey
- Unknown – Signal Cheshire

== Programme debuts ==
- 11 January – Essential Selection on BBC Radio 1 (1991–Present)
- February – Talking Heads (radio version) on BBC Radio 4 (1991)
- 9 August – On the Hour on BBC Radio 4 (1991–1992)
- 7 September – The Harpoon on BBC Radio 4 (1991–1994)
- 5 October – 6-0-6 on BBC Radio 5 (1991–Present)

== Continuing radio programmes ==
=== 1940s ===
- Sunday Half Hour (1940–2018)
- Desert Island Discs (1942–Present)
- Down Your Way (1946–1992)
- Letter from America (1946–2004)
- Woman's Hour (1946–Present)
- A Book at Bedtime (1949–Present)

=== 1950s ===
- The Archers (1950–Present)
- The Today Programme (1957–Present)
- Sing Something Simple (1959–2001)
- Your Hundred Best Tunes (1959–2007)

=== 1960s ===
- Farming Today (1960–Present)
- In Touch (1961–Present)
- The World at One (1965–Present)
- The Official Chart (1967–Present)
- Just a Minute (1967–Present)
- The Living World (1968–Present)
- The Organist Entertains (1969–2018)

=== 1970s ===
- PM (1970–Present)
- Start the Week (1970–Present)
- Week Ending (1970–1998)
- You and Yours (1970–Present)
- I'm Sorry I Haven't a Clue (1972–Present)
- Good Morning Scotland (1973–Present)
- Kaleidoscope (1973–1998)
- Newsbeat (1973–Present)
- The News Huddlines (1975–2001)
- File on 4 (1977–Present)
- Money Box (1977–Present)
- The News Quiz (1977–Present)
- Breakaway (1979–1998)
- Feedback (1979–Present)
- The Food Programme (1979–Present)
- Science in Action (1979–Present)

=== 1980s ===
- In Business (1983–Present)
- Sounds of the 60s (1983–Present)
- Loose Ends (1986–Present)

=== 1990s ===
- Jazz Parade (1990–1993)
- Formula Five (1990–1994)
- The Moral Maze (1990–Present)

== Ending this year ==
- 25 July – Citizens (1987–1991)
- 29 August – Top of the Pops (1988–1991)
- 23 December – And Now in Colour (1990–1991)

== Closing this year ==
- 2 March – Radio 4 News FM (1991)
- March –
  - BBC Radio Gwent (1983–1991)
  - City Talk 1548 AM (1989–1991)
- 30 August – Pennine FM (1975–1991)
- 31 August – East End Radio (1990–1991)
- Unknown – Echo 96 (1990–1991)

== Deaths ==
- 20 February – Kathleen Garscadden, Scottish children's presenter (born 1897)
- 10 August – Peter Clayton, jazz presenter (born 1927)
- 20 June – Gerald Priestland, correspondent (born 1927)
- 30 July – Max Jaffa, violinist and bandleader (born 1911)
- 14 December – John Arlott, cricket commentator (born 1914)

== See also ==
- 1991 in British music
- 1991 in British television
- 1991 in the United Kingdom
- List of British films of 1991
