= Matthew Rudd =

English radio personality and DJ

Matthew Rudd is an English radio personality and disc jockey. Between May 2013 and March 2026 he presented the weekly Forgotten 80s radio show on Absolute 80s. He also serves as a columnist for Classic Pop.

== Early career ==
Rudd was brought up and educated in Hedon, East Riding of Yorkshire, and started his working life as a journalist, working for a news agency. He began his radio career as an amateur on the local hospital radio station in Hull, Kingstown Radio. He also supplemented this experience by working on other local amateur stations.

Rudd joined Hallam FM in Sheffield in 1996, and thus became a radio professional. A year later he joined Viking FM, working on through the nights and presenting the station's football show. In 2001, Rudd moved to Imagine FM in Stockport and presented the evening show before moving to the breakfast show. Rudd also produced and presented the station's coverage of Stockport County during his time at Imagine. Whilst based in Stockport, Rudd started work hosting a weekly 80s night at Cobdens nightclub, which continued for eight years.

In 2005, Rudd left Imagine and went freelance for two years. During this time he travelled the United Kingdom and worked for Century FM (Manchester and Newcastle), Magic AM (Sheffield), TFM Radio (Middlesbrough), 97.2 Stray FM (Harrogate), Home FM (Huddersfield), Minster FM (York) and Heart West Midlands (Birmingham).

== KCFM ==
Rudd returned to Hull in 2007 and joined new independent station KCFM, the station having been granted an OFCOM broadcast licence in 2006 after a trial period.

When the station started broadcasting in August 2007, Rudd presented the night show during the week, the Sunday breakfast show, the '70s show on Tuesday nights and Sportscall, a show dedicated to providing an on-air forum to supporters of Hull City, Hull F.C. and Hull Kingston Rovers, with each club having a weekly fans panel. He also interviewed both current and former players and staff from all clubs, including co-hosting the show with Hull City chairman Paul Duffen on Thursdays.

He later scaled down his duties in order to concentrate on SportsCall, before departing the station in November 2008 to return to freelancing.

== Pennine 107.9 FM ==
On 12 November 2009, it was announced he would return to Huddersfield's Pennine FM after a stint previously on the station during its Home 107.9 branding. Rudd launched their brand new Breakfast Show on 4 January 2010. However, the station closed down in April 2010.

== Q Radio ==
Rudd presented a weekly 1980s music show for digital and satellite station Q Radio from September 2010 until the station was discontinued in May 2013.

== Absolute 80s ==
In May 2013, Rudd moved to digital radio station Absolute 80s to present the weekly Forgotten 80s show, which aired each Sunday evening. The show ended suddenly in March 2026.

== Disco Dancing 80s ==
From 5 May 2018, a new weekly two-hour show Disco Dancing 80s, presented by Rudd, was broadcast on Saturdays from 7 pm on Imagine FM.

From 26 May 2018, this was also broadcast on Hull Kingston Radio from 8 pm.

== Miscellaneous ==
Rudd is a supporter of Hull City. He is a contributor to club fanzine Amber Nectar, and also acts as editor-at-large for the site, while also hosting and producing its weekly podcasts. He has also written several articles on the club for football magazine When Saturday Comes and has been a correspondent on club affairs for Talksport.
