= Anna Foster (broadcaster) =

English presenter (born 1979)

- Born: 1979 (age 46–47)
- Children: 3
- Presenting career
- Station: BBC Radio Newcastle (present)
- Stations: Previously: TFM Radio, Metro Radio, Magic FM
- Style: Radio presenter
- Country: United Kingdom

Anna Foster (born 1979) is an English radio and television presenter, singer and voice over artist. She is best known for her broadcasting work on Metro Radio, Magic FM and BBC Radio Newcastle.

== Personal life ==
Foster is married and has three children. She lives in County Durham in the North East of England.

In 2019, Foster opened up about her mental health to ChronicleLive, in which she said she has obsessive–compulsive disorder.

== Career ==
Foster is best known for her radio broadcasting work over of 20 years. She presented popular breakfast shows on both Metro Radio and Magic FM. Since 2017, she has presented on BBC Radio Newcastle, hosting the breakfast show with Alfie Joey before taking over the mid-morning programme in which she currently presents. Foster has previously presented programmes for Made In Tyne and Wear, now known as Tyne & Wear TV.

Foster often hosts award ceremonies, fashion shows and choir concerts in the North East. In 2013, she organised a Christmas choir, in which she is a classically trained soprano singer.

Foster has appeared regularly across local media in the North East, including Appetite Magazine.

On 27 September 2012, Foster had to present her programme from her phone due to being stuck in traffic in Newcastle upon Tyne.
