= Nation Radio East Yorkshire =

Nation Radio Yorkshire
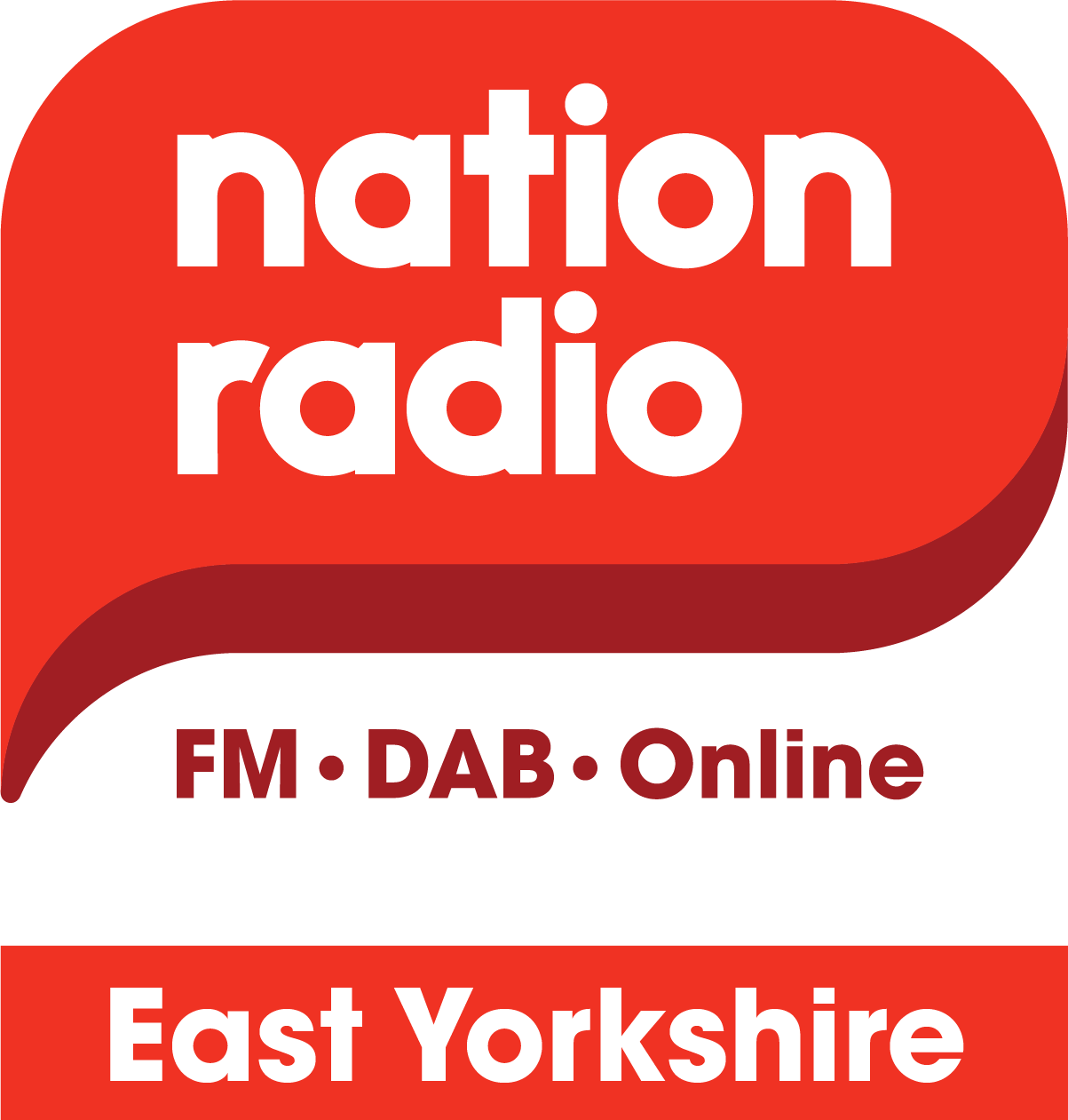
- Kingston upon Hull and the East Riding of Yorkshire; United Kingdom
- Frequencies: FM: 99.8 MHz; DAB: MuxCo Lincolnshire & North Yorkshire

Programming
- Format: Adult contemporary
- Network: Nation Radio Network

Ownership
- Owner: Nation Broadcasting

History
- First air date: 1 August 2007
- Former names: KCFM (2007–2020); Greatest Hits Radio (2020–2022); Nation Radio East Yorkshire (2022–2025)

Links
- Website: Nation Radio Yorkshire

Nation Radio Yorkshire, formerly GHR Hull & East Yorkshire and KCFM, is an Independent Local Radio station serving Kingston upon Hull and the East Riding of Yorkshire, which is owned and operated by Nation Broadcasting. This new licence was advertised by Ofcom in 2006.

As KCFM, it was owned by the Lincs FM Group. In early 2019, it was sold on to Nation Broadcasting, under the licensed name of Greatest Hits Radio. On 19 September 2022, the licensing name agreement ended and the station became part of the Nation Radio network.

As of September 2024, the station broadcasts to a weekly audience of 56,000, according to RAJAR.

== Background ==
KCFM was run by a local consortium – under the name of Planet Broadcasting Limited. In June 2009 a share exchange was agreed with the Lincs FM Group.

The late Tim Jibson, who was a member of the team that acquired the original Ofcom licence, was the launch director and was also the Director of Programmes until May 2009, when he moved on to the role of managing director of Adventures in Radio Ltd. Jibson had previously worked for Viking FM and Viking Gold (later known as Greatest Hits Radio) and for BBC Radio Humberside.

== Launch ==
The station carried out a full month of test transmissions before launch at 6:00 a.m. on 1 August 2007. The first voice heard on-air was that of Steve Jordan who then introduced the Director of Programmes Tim Jibson. Jordan then played the first music track "Twist and Shout" by The Beatles. The Planet House studio building was then officially opened by the England Football Manager Steve McClaren.

== Programming and presenters ==
=== Programming ===
Nation Radio Yorkshire broadcasts a mix of regional and networked programming.

=== Regional Shows ===
- Weekday Breakfast With Alex Duffy (6-10am)
- Weekday Mid Morning with Griffo (10am-1pm)
- Weekday Daytime with Matt Hutchinson (1-4pm)
- Weekday Drivetime with Sean Goldsmith (4-8pm)

=== Local presenters ===
- Alex Duffy
- Griffo (Paul Griffiths)
- Matt Hutchinson
- Sean Goldsmith

=== Networked Presenters ===
- Tim Allen
- Gary Parker
- Mark Collins
- Mark Franklin
- Tony Shepherd
- Roberto
- Neil Greenslade
- Neil Fox
- Greg Burns

As Nation Radio Yorkshire, local programming is broadcast from 6am to 8pm Monday to Friday plus 10am to 2pm on Saturday and Sunday. The rest of the time it takes networked programming from Nation Radio UK, with opt-outs for news, sport, travel and weather updates. During local programming, the station plays a separate playlist to Nation Radio UK.

== Technical ==
=== Transmission ===
The station broadcasts on 99.8 MHz FM. Its transmission area covers the City of Kingston upon Hull and the neighbouring towns of Beverley, Driffield and Goole in East Yorkshire and Barton-upon-Humber in North Lincolnshire – from a transmitter mast on top of the Humber Bridge's north pier. KCFM was also available via DAB, launched on that platform in October 2016. In early 2019, KCFM moved DAB multiplexes from the Lincolnshire multiplex to Bauer's Humberside multiplex offering a better geographical fit with its FM distribution, albeit available only in mono due to limitations of capacity on the mux. On 30 November 2025, Nation Radio Yorkshire came off Bauer Humberside and instead moved to transmit its digital broadcasts in stereo using the more efficient DAB+ broadcast standard via the MuxCo-operated Lincolnshire and North Yorkshire digital multiplexes, taking the place of the earlier-added Nation 80s on these platforms.

=== Studios ===
A purpose built studio complex was constructed at "Planet House" on Hedon Road in Hull. Studio Design was carried out by Bob Corn of the Corn Tarrant Partnership – Technical Installation by Radio Studio Services – which is headed up by Richard Lawley. The station has no local studios or office with shows done from home studios.

== Branding ==
Nation Radio Yorkshire currently airs a composite jingle package, which was also made for the other Nation-branded stations, produced by Ignite Jingles and TM Studios.
