= Metro Radio group =

Metropolitan Broadcasting, or the Metro Radio Group as it was more commonly known, was a group of Independent Local Radio stations in North East of England.

The group originally consisted of:

- Metro FM (which later became Metro Radio, and is now Hits Radio North East).
- Radio Tees (previously TFM Radio, now Hits Radio Teesside).
- Great North Radio (which later became Magic 1170 & Magic 1152).

Between 1986 and 1987, Radio Tees relayed some programmes of Metro Radio in mono - originally their overnight programme, expanding it to include Alan Robson's Night Owls on weeknights and a music show with John Oley on Fridays and by the summer of 86, it was further extended to 7 pm to include Nicky Brown, resulting in Radio Tees being Radio Tees from 7 am to 7 pm and at night, "Metro And Tees Together!". This carried on when Radio Tees becoming TFM in January 88 - the service was "Metro And TFM Together" - just before Easter, TFM became its own station - still remaining part of the Metro Radio Group, but no longer broadcasting identical programme output.

In December 1988, the Metro Radio Group was floated on the Unlisted Securities Market.

In October 1990, Metro Radio Group carried out a hostile takeover of Yorkshire Radio Network, a Sheffield based company. The Group thus expanded, and after the takeover the group also owned:

- Viking Radio (which later became 96.9 Viking FM).
- Pennine Radio (which later became The Pulse of West Yorkshire).
- Radio Hallam (which later became Hallam FM).
- Classic Gold (which, after the take over was changed to "Great Yorkshire Gold", it later became Magic 1161, Magic AM and Pulse Gold)

Then, in 1991, Metro Radio Group made a conditional agreement to sell Singapore Group.

In September 1995, Metro Radio was bought by Emap for £102 million. The Metro Radio Group was taken over by Emap in 1996. Following this, nearly all of the group's radio stations including Metro Radio itself were brought and branded under Emap Radio (with the exception of The Pulse, which was the subject of a management buyout by The Radio Partnership). After the acquisition of Emap Radio, these stations were branded under Bauer Radio.
