= Greatest Hits Radio South Yorkshire =

Radio programme broadcast in Yorkshire, England

- Sheffield; United Kingdom
- Broadcast area: South Yorkshire and North Midlands
- Frequencies: FM: 96.1 MHz (Rotherham); 102.0 MHz (Barnsley); 107.1 MHz (Doncaster); 107.9 MHz (Bassetlaw); DAB: 11C
- Branding: The Good Times Sound Like This; Across South Yorkshire

Programming
- Format: Oldies
- Network: Greatest Hits Radio; GHR Yorkshire

Ownership
- Owner: Bauer
- Sister stations: Hits Radio South Yorkshire

History
- First air date: 1 May 1989
- Former names: Classic Gold; Classic Gold Radio; Great Yorkshire Gold; Great Yorkshire Radio; Magic AM; Hallam 2
- Former frequencies: MW: 990 kHz; 1305 kHz; 1548 KHz

Links
- Website: GHR South Yorkshire

Greatest Hits Radio South Yorkshire is an Independent Local Radio station serving South Yorkshire and the North Midlands, which broadcasts as part of the Greatest Hits Radio network.

As of March 2024, the station broadcasts to a weekly audience of 272,000 listeners, according to RAJAR.

== Technical ==
The station broadcast on three separate frequencies, 990 kHz in Doncaster, 1305 kHz in Barnsley and 1548 kHz in Sheffield. It now just broadcasts on DAB.

== History ==
The station was created when Radio Hallam split its FM and medium wave frequencies to provide two different services. The AM station became "Classic Gold", then "Classic Gold Radio", "Great Yorkshire Gold" and "Great Yorkshire Radio". The original incarnation was owned by The Yorkshire Radio Network who were then taken over by Metro Radio Group before being bought by EMAP in 1996.

At the start of 1997, EMAP decided to scrap the regional Classic Gold station and replaced it with local stations under the brandname of Magic, with a new format of Hot Adult Contemporary music. Magic AM launched at 8 am on 12 February 1997.

In December 2001, EMAP decided that it was more economical for the Magic AM to share off-peak programmes in line with the other 7 Magic stations in northern England. Stations began networking 10 am-2 pm from Magic 1152 in Manchester, and 7 pm-6 am from the London station Magic 105.4 providing the programmes – during these hours it was simply known as Magic, although there were local commercial breaks, and local news on the hour.

In January 2003, after a sharp decline in listening, the station ceased networking with the London station, Magic 105.4, and a regional northern network was created with Magic 1152 at the hub at the weekend and the Newcastle station of the same name during the week. During networked hours, local adverts are aired, as well as a local news summary on the hour.

From July 2006, more networking was introduced across the northern Magic stations, meaning only the breakfast show would be produced locally. However the decision was taken in April 2013 to network this show across the other Yorkshire-based Magic stations and the Leeds-based programme replaced the locally produced show. The regional breakfast show was axed in December 2014.

On 5 January 2015, Magic AM was rebranded as Hallam 2 as part of a revamp of the Bauer network and is entirely networked with the other Bauer AM stations in the North although local news, weather and travel continue to be broadcast as opt-outs during the day.

On 7 January 2019, Hallam 2 rebranded as Greatest Hits Radio South Yorkshire.
