= Ingrid Hagemann =

Radio and television presenter

Ingrid Hagemann (Johnson)
- Spouse: Andrew Johnson
- Children: 1
- Presenting career
- Stations: BBC Radio Newcastle (until 2017), Metro Radio
- Style: Television, radio presenter, voice over
- Country: United Kingdom
- Website: https://www.ingridvoiceover.com/

Ingrid Hagemann (Johnson) is a radio presenter, television presenter, voice-over artist and event host. She is best known for her work for Sky UK and the BBC.

== Career ==
Hagemann started her radio career after seeing an advert for a female presenter for Metro Radio (Metro FM at the time). She is best known for her radio work, presenting on various stations including the BBC, previously working for BBC Radio Newcastle on programmes such as ‘Absolute Best’ on Saturday afternoons and the Sunday faith programme.

Hagemann hosted ‘Hits Not Homework’ with Lee Finan for years, before hosting it by herself. She also hosted shows such as ‘Sunday Surgery’ and ‘Dance Decade’.

In 1999 Metro Radio screened a giant image of her onto Durham Cathedral, with a 100 ft image of her wearing a low-cut top and angel's wings to advertise her programme.

In 2003, Hagemann moved to London's Capital FM Network working alongside the likes of Neil "Dr" Fox, to present the overnights from 1 a.m. to 6 a.m.

In 2006, Hagemann worked alongside Bill Clinton as part of her role as ambassador for The Postcode Lottery.

By 2007, she was presenting for Radio Aire in Leeds. Ingrid posed for a topless lifestyle magazine, in the same year. She was given a warning from Radio Aire bosses after she took time off for ‘being ill’.

In the same year, Hagemann hosted Netball Superleague for Sky Sports 2.

Hagemann is currently an event host and voice-over artist, running her own business for many years. She is married to Andrew Johnson, they have a daughter together.

In 2016 and 2019, Hagemann hosted the North East Business Awards alongside Alfie Joey.

In 2023, she was a featured guest on Alfie Joey’s podcast called ‘Speakers Corner with Alfie Joey’.
