= Magic (English former radio network) =

Former British radio network

England
- Broadcast area: Northern England

Programming
- Format: Hot Adult Contemporary

Ownership
- Owner: Bauer Radio

History
- First air date: July 1990
- Last air date: 4 January 2015
- Former frequencies: MW, DAB

Magic was an AM radio network based in Northern England.

== History ==
The Magic brand in UK radio originated with Magic 828, the sister station of Radio Aire in Leeds which was launched in July 1990, although no other stations were branded 'Magic' until the Emap group purchased the Metro Radio Group in 1995. It can be regarded as the successor to Great North Radio which was a small network in the North East that consisted of what became Magic 1170 and Magic 1152. Preston's Red Rose Gold was the last to be converted to the Magic brand, in 2000, two or so years since the conversion of the majority of the stations. In London, Melody FM was rebranded Magic 105.4 in 1998.

The northern AM stations played Hot Adult Contemporary music. The playlists of these Magic stations predominantly consisted of hits from the 1960s and 1970s, although music from other decades was included in the mix.

The London station is more laid-back and its playlist more contemporary, playing soft adult contemporary hits from the 1980s, 1990s, and 2000s. The London station is branded with the tagline, "More music, less talk".

On 5 January 2015, the network merged with the Greatest Hits Network of Scottish AM stations to form the Bauer City 2 network. The London-based Magic became available nationally via DAB at the same time.

== Directory of stations ==
Region	City	Station
North East	Newcastle	Magic 1152
North East	Stockton-on-Tees	Magic 1170
North West	Liverpool	Magic 1548
North West	Manchester	Magic 1152
North West	Preston	Magic 999
Yorkshire	Hull	Magic 1161
Yorkshire	Leeds	Magic 828
Yorkshire	Sheffield	Magic 990, 1305 & 1548 (known on-air as Magic AM)

== Television channel ==
Following the success of the radio stations, Emap set up a corresponding Magic TV channel which is available through satellite and cable television systems and plays non-stop videos of songs established as typical of the Magic brand.

== Magic albums ==
The Magic network released several albums since the formation of the network in the late 1990s. The albums predominantly feature music on the Magic 105.4 play list, but were also promoted on the Northern England stations too.

Title	Release
The Sound of Magic	1999-05-31
The Sound of Magic Love	1999-10-01
The Sound of Magic Vol. 2	2000-05-15
Magic	2001-03-12
Magic Summer Feeling	2003-06-13
Magic the Album 2005	2005-11-28
Magic Summer	2006-05-15
Mellow Magic	2007-02-26
Magic the Album 2007	2007-08-20
Magic Decades 80s 90s 00s	2007-11-19
