= Radio Cracker =

Series of charity radio stations

Radio Cracker is the name of a series of short term RSL charity radio stations broadcasting in the UK and around the world in order to raise awareness of issues in the developing world.

== Background ==
In 1989, an nationwide youth project known as Christmas Cracker was set up by Richard Wood on behalf of Tearfund and the Oasis Trust to inform and educate people about the poverty and suffering that were the everyday experience of thousands of those living in Third World countries. It challenged and encouraged members of various Christian bodies to show their concern in a practical manner by organising and working together with people from all faiths and none to raise money for humanitarian projects in the developing world. One of their most innovative fundraising ideas was that of 'Radio Cracker', a chain of radio stations that under a radio authority licence could broadcast for a maximum of 28 days during the period leading up to Christmas.

In 1991, there were 90 individual Radio Cracker RSL's which between them raised around £500,000 for third world aid, while in 1992, there were 83 stations, all broadcasting to their own communities across the UK, often from shopping centres. The numbers fell in later years as the organisation had moved on, the final two being Radio Cracker Ballymena in the Mid Antrim area of Northern Ireland and Rugby Cracker in Warwickshire. Ballymena still operates on FM, whilst Rugby has recently struggled to find sponsors for the FM licence costs and is therefore online only.

Some of the organisations ran additional fundraising activities, and Rugby continues to operate a café and a table service evening meal à la carte.

== Branding ==
Each individual station was sent a CD containing celebrity voice overs, sound effects and jingles. Station idents featured the slogan "Tune in - Pay Out". Other idents were made locally by each station in order to promote their individual frequencies.

== Programmes ==
The programmes were wide and varied on each station. In 1992, there was also a national sustaining service broadcast via a sub-carrier on an Astra satellite, thanks to a deal with BSkyB who also provided Teletext pages to allow the Harrow team to communicate with the rest of the network.

For example: on the Chippenham RSL, in 1992 sixth form students Simon Tapscott and Ben Cullum co-hosted "The Bob & Si Late Night Show", a weekly chat show on Saturday nights featuring an eclectic mix of live music and current affairs, broadcast live from The Causeway in Chippenham. Guests included Geography teacher Mr Devine, Alan Donald, Scott Sheppard, Owen Dyke, Justin Maelzer and Matthew Lowe with a celebrity Stinger. You can hear these shows at https://soundcloud.com/simon-tapscott/sets/the-bob-si-late-night-show-radio-cracker-1992.

== Sustaining Service ==
In 1992, utilising an audio sub-channel on Sky's satellite, the sustaining service was provided by the Radio Cracker team from Harrow led by Paul Simmonds. This service ran as Radio Cracker Harrow during the daytime, providing national news on the hour for the Cracker network as well as a 30-minute magazine program of material from around the Radio Cracker network at 7 pm every evening. From 10 pm until 6 am the Harrow service broadcast as just Radio Cracker, allowing all the other projects to use it as a sustaining service.

== Presenters ==
Many people who presented on Radio Cracker have managed to break through into professional broadcasting. Sylvie Blackmore of BBC Southern Counties Radio, Steve Jordan of Viking FM and Phil Holmes of Star Radio North East are three of them. Dave Williams of 100.7 Heart FM also first broadcast on a Radio Cracker station in Rugby. Chris Fox, who first broadcast on Radio Cracker in Worcester, is now the Station manager for Youthcomm Radio, another station originally set up by Radio Cracker founder Richard Wood. Kevin Ford who broadcast with Radio Cracker Ipswich, is breakfast show host on 3FM on the Isle of Man. Roy Willighan from Radio Cracker Ballymena is now a television continuity announcer and director with BBC Northern Ireland and Jason Rosam a reporter and presenter on BBC London 94.9 became interested in radio at 14 after presenting his own show on a Radio Cracker station in Poole in 1993. Sony Award nominated Claire Anderson, who presents The Late Lounge for Jazz FM, had her first on air experience at Radio Cracker Prescot in Merseyside in 1991. Steve Furnell, Breakfast show host on the North East station Metro FM was a frequent presenter on Radio Cracker Whitley Bay, whilst still at high school in North Shields and J-H. John Scott who worked on the Inverclyde Radio Cracker in Scotland in 1991 and 1992 Now works for Scottish station Your Radio as well as the soon to be launched Timeless Radio

As well as launching new radio careers, existing Radio professionals worked on the RSLs. For example, former Radio Caroline presenter, Eric Wiltsher, worked on the 1994 Orpington RSL, not only presenting on the station, but promoting it on his then pan-European radio show.
