= List of British films of 1989 =

A list of films produced in the United Kingdom in 1989 (see 1989 in film):

== 1989 ==
Title	Director	Cast	Genre	Notes
1989
All Dogs Go to Heaven	Don Bluth	Burt Reynolds, Dom DeLuise	Animation	
Batman	Tim Burton	Jack Nicholson, Michael Keaton, Kim Basinger, Robert Wuhl, Pat Hingle, Billy Dee Williams, Michael Gough, Jack Palance	Superhero	
The BFG	Brian Cosgrove	David Jason, Amanda Root	Animation	
Black Rainbow	Mike Hodges	Rosanna Arquette, Jason Robards	Thriller	
The Cook, the Thief, His Wife & Her Lover	Peter Greenaway	Richard Bohringer, Michael Gambon, Helen Mirren, Alan Howard	Drama	
Crusoe	Caleb Deschanel	Aidan Quinn, Adé Sapara	Adventure	
Dealers	Colin Bucksey	Paul McGann, Rebecca De Mornay	Drama	
Edge of Sanity	Gérard Kikoïne	Anthony Perkins, Glynis Barber	Horror	Co-production with Hungary
Erik the Viking	Terry Jones	Tim Robbins, Tim McInnerny	Comedy	
Eversmile, New Jersey	Carlos Sorín	Daniel Day-Lewis, Mirjana Joković	Comedy/drama	
For Queen and Country	Martin Stellman	Denzel Washington, Bruce Payne	Crime drama	
Getting It Right	Randal Kleiser	Jesse Birdsall, Jane Horrocks, Helena Bonham Carter	Comedy	
Henry V	Kenneth Branagh	Kenneth Branagh, Brian Blessed	Literary drama	Adaptation of Shakespeare's play
How to Get Ahead in Advertising	Bruce Robinson	Richard E. Grant, Rachel Ward	Comedy	
Howling V: The Rebirth	Neal Sundstrom	Philip Davis, Victoria Catlin	Horror	
King of the Wind	Peter Duffell	Richard Harris, Glenda Jackson	Adventure	
Licence to Kill	John Glen	Timothy Dalton, Robert Davi, Talisa Soto, Carey Lowell	Spy/action	Filmed in Mexican studiss
Little Sweetheart	Anthony Simmons	John Hurt, Karen Young	Thriller	
Melancholia	Andi Engel	Jeroen Krabbé, Susannah York	Thriller	Co-production with West Germany
My Left Foot	Jim Sheridan	Daniel Day-Lewis, Ray McAnally, Brenda Fricker	Biopic	Won two Academy Awards
The Rachel Papers	Damian Harris	Dexter Fletcher, Ione Skye, Jonathan Pryce	Drama	
The Rainbow	Ken Russell	Sammi Davis, Amanda Donohoe	Drama	Entered into the 16th Moscow International Film Festival
Resurrected	Paul Greengrass			Entered into the 39th Berlin International Film Festival
Return from the River Kwai	Andrew McLaglen	Edward Fox, Chris Penn, Denholm Elliott	War	
The Return of the Musketeers	Richard Lester	Michael York, Oliver Reed, Frank Finlay, Richard Chamberlain	Adventure	
Reunion	Jerry Schatzberg			Entered into the 1989 Cannes Film Festival
Scandal	Michael Caton-Jones	John Hurt, Joanne Whalley, Bridget Fonda, Ian McKellen	Drama	Screened at the 1989 Cannes Film Festival
Shirley Valentine	Lewis Gilbert	Pauline Collins, Tom Conti, Alison Steadman	Comedy/drama	
Slipstream	Steven Lisberger	Mark Hamill, Bill Paxton, Bob Peck, Kitty Aldridge, Ben Kingsley, F. Murray Abraham	Science fiction	
Strapless	David Hare	Blair Brown, Bruno Ganz, Bridget Fonda	Drama	
The Tall Guy	Mel Smith	Jeff Goldblum, Emma Thompson	Comedy	
Tank Malling	James Marcus	Ray Winstone, Amanda Donohoe	Thriller	
Ten Little Indians	Alan Birkinshaw	Donald Pleasence, Frank Stallone	Mystery	
That Summer of White Roses	Rajko Grlić	Tom Conti, Rod Steiger, Susan George	War	British-Yugoslav co-production
Torrents of Spring	Jerzy Skolimowski	Nastassja Kinski, Timothy Hutton, Valeria Golino	Romance/drama	Co-production with France and Italy
Tree of Hands	Giles Foster	Helen Shaver, Lauren Bacall	Drama	
Urge to Kill	Derek Ford	Peter Gordeno, Jeremy Mark	Thriller	
War Requiem	Derek Jarman	Laurence Olivier, Tilda Swinton, Sean Bean	Music	Olivier's last film
When the Whales Came	Clive Rees	Paul Scofield, David Threlfall, Helen Mirren	Drama	
Wilt	Michael Tuchner	Griff Rhys Jones, Mel Smith	Comedy	
The Wolves of Willoughby Chase	Stuart Orme	Stephanie Beacham, Mel Smith	Family	

== See also ==
- 1989 in British music
- 1989 in British radio
- 1989 in British television
- 1989 in the United Kingdom
