= Paul Fairburn =

British online marketing consultant

- Born: Horsforth, Leeds, Yorkshire, England
- Occupation: Online Marketing Consultant
- Known for: Managing Director of Heart FM and Galaxy 102.2, Managing Director (Digital Platforms) Global Radio, Internet Consultant
- Website: www.aimiable.com

Paul Fairburn is a British online marketing consultant. He started out working in commercial radio and managed a number of different stations, before moving into digital operations for Chrysalis Radio (later Global Radio).

== Career ==
Paul Fairburn started as a journalist working for Pennine Radio and during the 1980s was a presenter on Pennine Radio and Radio Aire. In 1990 he moved back to Radio Aire to become Programme Controller, and was responsible for the launch and success of Magic 828. He then became the Programme Director of 100.7 Heart FM in Birmingham, later being promoted to Managing Director of both Heart FM and Galaxy 102.2, Birmingham. Whilst there he made the news for allowing listeners to vote on whether to burn 5,000 a woman had won in a competition and was going to spend on plastic surgery. For a year (2005–06) he was also Managing Director of Heart 106 in Nottingham.

At Heart FM he achieved Profit growth of over 75% in first 4 years, significantly ahead of the industry average.

From 2002 Paul was also Managing Director of Chrysalis Radio Digital Operations. This involved overseeing digital carriage for Chrysalis brands, and it included a first for the Freeview platform; Heart became the first brand to regionalise its output, enabling listeners to hear their local station on Freeview.

He then became Managing Director – Digital Platforms, for Chrysalis (which then became Global Radio). There he was until March 2008, responsible for Global Radio's online, mobile, DAB and DTV activity and he led the commercial interactive team producing client websites - including the Motorola Red campaign site for much of UK commercial radio. He then became a Freelance Consultant and worked on a variety of projects including; research for a traffic management project, advising a US web company, and website optimisation for a recycling company.

In 2011 he set up his own consultancy, Aimiable Consulting Ltd, to provide online marketing, SEO and Social Media services.

In 2012 he worked on a web training project on the UNMISS (United Nations) compound in Juba, South Sudan.
