= Alan Robson =

British radio personality

Alan Robson MBE
- Born: 1 October 1955 (age 71); Benwell, Newcastle upon Tyne, England
- Occupation: Radio presenter

Alan Robson MBE (born 1 October 1955) is a former English radio presenter, and former host of the North East radio talk show, Alan Robson's Night Owls.

== Radio ==
Robson started his career with Metro Radio in Gateshead, presenting his first show on 12 November 1976. Initially, he hosted specialist rock music shows for the station, including Bridges and Hot 'n' Heavy Express on Saturday nights.

Night Owls launched shortly after Metro began broadcasting in July 1974, initially presented by James Whale, then followed by Allan Beswick, Tony Crosby and Dave Porter, before Robson took over in 1983.

Alan Robson's Night Owls won Robson a gold New York Radio Award for Best Radio Personality in a local market in 2019. In later years, Night Owls aired from 10pm - 2am from Sunday to Thursday nights. From October 2012, the Monday to Thursday night shows were simulcast on Metro's sister station TFM.

Night Owls aired for the final time on Metro Radio and TFM on 27 June 2019 with a specially extended highlights show. Robson continued with station owners Bauer as host of a weekly Sunday night version of Night Owls on sister station Greatest Hits Radio North East from August 2019 to the end of April 2022.

He claims that in November 2000 he received a master's degree in Exorcism and Spiritualism at Birkbeck, University of London.

== Television ==
Robson has presented 14 different television series (such as Robson's People and Robson's Personal Call) for Tyne Tees Television and appears on Living Channel.

He contributes to Scariest Places on Earth, which is broadcast across parts of the U.S. by ABC. While making the show, he broadcasts his radio show from the 'haunted' locations. He has also appeared on dozens of hit TV shows as an expert on the paranormal, including Larry King Live and appeared in the BBC One documentary series Trouble in Store.

== Books ==
Alan Robson has written or compiled five books:

- Simply The Best: Geordie Jokes and Stories
- Grisly Trails and Ghostly Tales
- Nightmare on Your Street: More Grisly Trails and Ghostly Tales
- Trimmings from the Triffid's Beard[
- The Lives and Loves of a Night Owl

His first five books were published between the years 1992 and 1994. The Lives and Loves of a Night Owl is his autobiography.

He also wrote a book called Grisly Trails and Ghostly Tales, an anthology of supernatural stories from North East England, followed up by a second book the following year.

He is also the editor of one book by the author Wayne Schreiber (Arise A Hero) published in 2011.
