= Pennine Radio (radio station) =

England
- Broadcast area: Bradford, Kirklees & Calderdale
- Frequencies: 96.0 MHz; 1278 kHz (235 metres)

Programming
- Format: Contemporary

Ownership
- Owner: Various

History
- First air date: 16 September 1975
- Last air date: 30 August 1991

Pennine Radio was the original name for what is now Hits Radio West Yorkshire in Bradford, the Independent Local Radio station for West Yorkshire, England. It was launched on 16 September 1975.

== History ==
Pennine Radio was the idea of Steve Harris and Terry Bate, the latter being a founding member of Metro Radio in Newcastle and Radio Trent in Nottingham. Its first presenter was Steve Merike and the first record played was 'I Can't Let Maggie Go' by Honeybus. Other original presenters on "Pennine 235" were Peter Levy, Stewart Francis, Roger Kirk, Julius K. Scragg, Liz Allen, Dorothy Box, Austin Mitchell (MP for Great Grimsby from 1977 to 2015), Mike Smith, Gerald Harper, Stewart Coxhead and Mike Hurley.

Pennine's original news department included the first news editor, Tony Cartledge (Metro), Steve Harris (deputy news editor), Mike Smith (sports editor) and reporters Martin Campbell (later a senior figure at Ofcom). Peter Milburn (later managing director of Red Dragon Radio in South Wales), Alan Brook, Helen Maskill, Nigel Baker (later going to Reuters), Paul Cooke, who also presented 'The Pennine Soul Express' (later going to Capital Radio) and Peter Judge. Later in the 1970s, Jim McVicar, Vyvyan Mackeson (later going to YTV), Barbara Groom (later going to LBC and now BBC World Service Editor), Tim Wyatt, Gerry Radcliffe, Will Venters (later going to YTV) and Christa Ackroyd (a former presenter on Yorkshire Television's Calendar and later BBC Look North),.

Other early Pennine staff included Frazer Hines, Ian Scott (formally from Piccadilly Radio's late show 1978–1979, who went on to broadcast under his real name Ian Hutchinson (Hutch) on BBC Radio Jersey), Brian McSharry, Paul Kaye, Mike Boothroyd, Louise Esplin, Venessa Hill, Paul Owens, Dave Gregory, Terry Davies (presented breakfast around the turn of the 1980s and left for Essex Radio), Paul Fairburn (took over on breakfast from Terry and continued until leaving for (Red Rose), Nick Risby (later going to Radio Broadland), Bob Preedy (later Radio Hallam, Aire, Tees, Magic 828, BBC Leeds, Humberside, York, YTV continuity announcer) Alan Ross (later going to CBC which would become Red Dragon FM) but return in summer 1986 for afternoons and then breakfast).

Richard Horsman spent 20 years at Pennine as a producer and presenter of 'Chips', a show for computer enthusiasts. He was also news editor in the 1990s and is now at the Centre for Journalism Leeds Trinity University College. Roger Kirk presented on Pennine from day one. He presented various programmes on the station, memorably his late show and Solid Gold Sunday, and a weekly 1950s' 'Rock'n'Roll' show.

Mid-1980s Pennine people included ex-BBC Radio 1 lunch-time presenter Paul Burnett hosting the breakfast show for 12 months from autumn 1984–85, Martin Kelner and Steve Truelove (both later going to BBC Radio 2), Mark Flanagan (left for the start of Ocean Sound), Andy Hitchcock (later going to BBC Radio York), Tony Fisher (left for BBC Radio Leeds), Simon Pattern (later going to Viking FM, then BBC Radio York and is now managing editor at BBC Radio Humberside). The show with the largest audience of the week was the Sunday Request Show presented by Dorothy Box, Bob Preedy and Brian Cooke - with a regular audience of 65,000 listeners. Brian went on to present weekend breakfast shows, programmes on Classic Gold and later Magic 828. Andy and Tony teamed up to become Ronnie and Gordon Groovesticker on Pennine's tea-time soap opera Mulberry Terrace which ran from spring 1985 to summer 1986.

Twenty-four-hour broadcasting began in the autumn of 1984. The gap between Roger Kirk's late show and Steve Truelove's early show was filled by Dave Nixon, who became legendary for his Night Strike competition: ten pin bowling on the wireless.

On 4 December 1984, the station officially began broadcasting to a much larger area. Having resigned the original franchise early, Managing Director Mike Boothroyd, Programme Controller Will Venters, Chief Engineer Steve Bowley, Sports Editor Tony Delahunty and the rest of the team at Pennine House were thrilled to win back their franchise, which transformed the station from one of the UK's smallest Independent Local Radio (ILR) stations to one of the biggest. Pennine was broadcasting to Bradford, West Leeds and the Aire Valley on 235 m MW/1278 kHz AM and 96 MHz VHF, and had new transmitters at Vicar's Lot overlooking the new additional area of Kirklees and Calderdale on 196 m MW/1530 kHz AM and 103.4 MHz VHF. In August 1985, 103.4 was changed to 102.5 as the first of the ILR frequency changes under the mid-1980s "Geneva convention" to lump ILR and BBC local FM frequencies into sub-bands. A month later the 103.4 frequency started to relay the new Doncaster signal of Radio Hallam. The station was part of the Yorkshire Radio Network from 1987, and its AM transmitters were used for the first form of Classic Gold. Pennine 235 as it was originally known became Pennine Radio changing again to Pennine FM after they were forced to split frequencies.

In 1989, Pennine lost its 103.2 frequency to incremental broadcaster Bradford City Radio. It is now used by Sunrise Radio (Yorkshire). After the takeover of YRN by the Metro Radio Group in 1990, Pennine FM was rebranded as The Pulse of West Yorkshire. The Metro Radio Group was itself taken over by EMAP in a deal worth £98.7 million in the summer of 1995. In November of the same year, EMAP was forced to sell both The Pulse and its AM sister service, Great Yorkshire Gold - regulations at the time prevented the same owner operating the overlapping AM licences. The stations were sold to a group formed by station management and former Metro Radio Group executives: The Radio Partnership. In 1999 the Radio Partnership was acquired by the Wireless Group, which was later purchased by UTV and the station continued to broadcast from Pennine House, in Forster Square in Bradford until July 2014 when the station relocated to new studios at St James' Business Park.

A tribute station called Pennine 235 has appeared online hoping to recreate the early Pennine sound, playing the music of the day with jingles of the era. The station said it planned to appear on Bradford DAB+ in 2023 subject to funding.

== Jingles ==
The first jingle package, completed with a cut, sang "Pennine two-thirty-five, that's the sound goin' into your ear'oles!". This was provided by Emison, the jingle arm of EMI Music. Some jingles in later packages produced by Alfasound, the UK agent for JAM Creative Productions, contained vocals by soul singer Jimmy Helms.

== Notable former presenters ==
Former notable presenters on the station include

- Christa Ackroyd
- Paul Burnett
- Jon Culshaw
- Ian Davidson
- Paul Fairburn
- Peter Levy
- Austin Mitchell
- Bob Preedy
