= Greatest Hits Radio East Yorkshire =

Greatest Hits Radio East Yorkshire & Northern Lincolnshire
- Hull; England
- Broadcast area: East Riding of Yorkshire and Northern Lincolnshire
- Frequency: DAB: 10D
- Branding: The Good Times Sound Like This; Across East Yorkshire & Northern Lincolnshire

Programming
- Format: Oldies
- Network: Greatest Hits Radio

Ownership
- Owner: Bauer
- Sister stations: Hits Radio East Yorkshire & North Lincolnshire

History
- First air date: 31 October 1988
- Former names: Viking Gold; Classic Gold; Classic Gold Radio; Great Yorkshire Gold; Great Yorkshire Radio; Magic 1161; Viking 2
- Former frequencies: 1161 kHz

Technical information
- Transmitter coordinates: 53.7065°N 0.3216°W

Links
- Website: GHR East Yorkshire

Greatest Hits Radio East Yorkshire & Northern Lincolnshire is an Independent Local Radio station serving East Riding of Yorkshire and Northern Lincolnshire. The station was replaced by a relay of Magic UK, as part of a restructure, on 1 September 2020.

On 19 September 2022, GHR Hull & East Yorkshire became part of the Nation Radio network, and was relaunched as Nation Radio East Yorkshire following the end of the licensing name agreement which had allowed GHR to broadcast on the Nation-owned licence.

As of March 2024, the station broadcasts to a weekly audience of 133,000 listeners, according to RAJAR.

== History ==
On 31 October 1988, Viking Radio permanently split its 1161 (originally said "Double-One-Six-One") medium wave frequency from its FM service when it launched "Viking Gold". Many different station names have been used over the years. "Viking Gold" was followed by "Classic Gold" (not to be confused with the service operated by UBC), "Classic Gold Radio", "Great Yorkshire Gold" and "Great Yorkshire Radio". Most of these formats, with the exception of "Viking Gold", shared programmes with the AM stations of the "Yorkshire Radio Network".

At the start of 1997, new owners Emap decided to scrap the regional Classic Gold station and replaced it with local stations under the brandname of Magic, with a new format of Hot Adult Contemporary music. Magic 1161 launched on 12 February 1997.

In December 2001, EMAP decided that it was more economical for the Magic network to share off-peak programmes and in line with the other Magic AM stations began networking between 10am-2pm, and 7pm-6am. During these hours it was simply known as Magic, although there were local commercial breaks, and local news on the hour.

In January 2003, after a sharp decline in listening, the station ceased networking with the London station, Magic 105.4, and a regional northern network was created with Magic 1152 at the hub at the weekend and the Newcastle station of the same name during the week. During networked hours, local adverts are aired, as well as a local news summary on the hour.

From July 2006, more networking was introduced across the Northern Magic AM network, leaving weekday breakfast, hosted by Darren Lethem, as the only locally produced show. The local show was replaced with a regional breakfast programme from Leeds, which ran from March 2013 to December 2014.

On 5 January 2015, Magic 1161 was rebranded as Viking 2 as part of a revamp of the Bauer network and the station is now entirely networked with the other Bauer AM stations in the North although local news, weather and travel continue to be broadcast as opt-outs during the day.

On 7 January 2019, Viking 2 rebranded as Greatest Hits Radio East Yorkshire & North Lincolnshire.

== Closure ==
On 31 August 2020, the station was replaced by a relay of Magic UK. On 19 September 2022, GHR East Yorkshire & Northern Lincolnshire returned on DAB only whist the Hull & East Yorkshire equivalent is now part of the Nation Radio Network. In February 2021, Bauer Media announced that the Goxhill transmitter will be switched off. Transmissions on 1161 medium wave ceased on 30 April 2021.

== Reinstated ==
On 19 September 2022, GHR East Yorkshire & Northern Lincolnshire has been reinstated on DAB Digital radio only, whilst GHR Hull & East Yorkshire has become part of the Nation Radio Network as Nation Radio East Yorkshire.
