= Hits Radio West Yorkshire =

Radio station in Bradford, West Yorkshire, England

- Leeds; United Kingdom
- Broadcast area: West Yorkshire
- Frequencies: FM: 97.5 MHz (Bradford); FM: 102.5 MHz (Huddersfield and Leeds); DAB: 11B (Bradford, Calderdale and Kirklees); DAB: 12D (Leeds and Wakefield)
- RDS: HITS WYk
- Branding: West Yorkshire’s Hits Radio; The Biggest Hits, The Biggest Throwbacks

Programming
- Format: CHR/Pop
- Network: Hits Radio

Ownership
- Owner: Bauer Media Audio UK
- Sister stations: Greatest Hits Radio West Yorkshire

History
- First air date: 16 September 1975 (48 years ago)
- Former names: Pennine Radio; Pennine FM; The Pulse; Pulse 1

Links
- Website: planetradio.co.uk/pulse1/

Hits Radio West Yorkshire, formerly Pulse 1, is an Independent Local Radio station based in Leeds, England, owned and operated by Bauer Media Audio UK as part of the Hits Radio network. It broadcasts to West Yorkshire.

As of September 2024, the station has a weekly audience of 170,000 listeners according to RAJAR.

== History ==
Pulse 1 logo used from 2010 to 2014.

The station originally launched in 1975 as a Bradford-based service called Pennine Radio.

=== Pennine Radio ===
In 1984, the station won the licence for the neighbouring West Yorkshire areas of Kirklees and Calderdale and in December of that year the station began broadcasting to all of the western half of the county.

In 1987, the station was part of the Yorkshire Radio Network which also owned Viking FM and Hallam FM, and the following year saw the station's MW frequencies start to be used for a Yorkshire-wide station called Classic Gold. The FM service was renamed to Pennine FM. Yorkshire Radio Network was bought out by Newcastle based Metro Radio Group (owners of Metro Radio and TFM). Pennine Radio became Pennine FM in the late 1980s when the AM frequency was split off to create the original incarnation of Classic Gold.

=== The Pulse/Pulse 1 ===
On 30 August 1991, Pennine FM was rebranded as "The Pulse" in a bid to revive flagging fortunes.

The Metro Radio Group itself was bought out by EMAP in 1996 and ownership rules at the time meant that as they already owned neighbouring Radio Aire in Leeds something had to be sold on, and that was The Pulse and its sister station Classic Gold which were purchased in a management buyout from senior staff and ex-Metro Group executives. The new company was called The Radio Partnership, it was at this time that the station moved to number one position in the West Yorkshire radio market for the first time in its history.

The Radio Partnership expanded over the years to include other stations, such as Signal Radio in Stoke-on-Trent. In 1999, Kelvin MacKenzie's Talk Radio UK bought The Radio Partnership and formed The Wireless Group to include the national broadcaster and a series of local stations. In July 2005 The Wireless Group was bought out by UTV Group. In September 2016, The Wireless Group was purchased by News UK.

On 8 February 2019, Pulse 1 and the Wireless Group's network of local radio stations were sold to Bauer.

In May 2020, Bauer announced that Pulse 1 would join the Hits Radio network, while retaining its on-air branding. Pulse 1 began carrying off-peak programming from the Hits Radio network on 15 June 2020 and the station officially joined the Hits Radio network on 20 July 2020.

In September 2020, Pulse 1 began broadcasting to the eastern part of West Yorkshire on DAB following the closure of sister station Radio Aire.

In March 2021, Bauer closed Pulse 1's Bradford studios and moved the station to the former Radio Aire studios in Leeds, co-locating with Greatest Hits Radio Yorkshire.

=== Hits Radio rebrand ===
On 10 January 2024, station owners Bauer announced Pulse 1 would be rebranded as Hits Radio West Yorkshire as part of a network-wide relaunch involving 17 local radio stations in England and Wales.

The name was changed on 17 April 2024, however the station’s local programming was not affected as a result of the relaunch.

On 20 March 2025, Bauer announced it would end its local Hits Radio breakfast show for West Yorkshire to be replaced by a new national breakfast show for England and Wales on 9 June 2025. Local news and traffic bulletins continue and the station's Leeds studios were retained.

The station's final local programme aired on 6 June 2025.

== Service area ==
The main 102.5 FM signal comes from the Vicars Lot transmitter close to the M62 between Scammonden Dam and junction 23, close to the Scammonden arched bridge. This signal covers most of West Yorkshire, including eastern areas of the county such as Leeds, Wakefield, Castleford, Pontefract and Knottingley.

It can be heard as far south as Doncaster and Sheffield, and also to the west of the Pennines in Lancashire and Greater Manchester. The signal is much stronger, and the transmitter at a higher altitude than the Idle transmitter.

The 97.5 FM signal covers Bradford, and comes from the Idle transmitter, which is on the top of Idle Moor, between Idle and Shipley. The Idle transmitter also carries national radio frequencies, Capital Yorkshire on 105.6 FM, Sunrise Radio Yorkshire on 103.2 FM and Heart Yorkshire on 107.6 FM.

== Programming ==
Hits Radio network programming is broadcast and produced from Bauer’s London headquarters or studios in Manchester & occasionally Newcastle.

=== News ===
Hits Radio West Yorkshire broadcasts local news bulletins hourly from 6 am–7 pm on weekdays and from 7 am–1 pm on weekends. Headlines are broadcast on the half-hour during weekday breakfast and drivetime shows. The station simulcasts hourly Sky News Radio bulletins at all other times.

==== Former sport programming ====
Pulse 1 aired extensive local sports coverage, including live match commentaries on Bradford City matches, led by Jason Thornton and former City striker Ian Ormondroyd, and a weekly rugby league magazine show, presented by Bradford Bulls CEO Robbie Hunter Paul.
