= Great North Radio =

England
- Broadcast area: North East England
- Frequencies: 1152 & 1170 kHz,

Programming
- Format: Oldies

Ownership
- Owner: Metro Radio Group

Great North Radio, or G.N.R as it was sometimes called, launched in March 1989 using the AM frequencies of Metro Radio and Radio Tees . This happened after the Metro Radio Group decided to split the FM and AM frequencies. The station was broadcast on both frequencies rather than as two separate stations.

GNR's output consisted of mellow music from the 1950s through to the 1980s, including current hits that fitted the format. There were also specialist programmes each evening, including Country Music, Jazz, and Classical.

GNR was replaced in February 1997 by Magic 1152 and Magic 1170 and was rebranded again in January 2015 when the stations became part of the Greatest Hits Radio network and are known on air as Greatest Hits Radio North East and Greatest Hits Radio Teesside.

== Branding ==
The station used slogans "40 Years of Hits", "Classic Songs, All-Time Hits" and "You've Got a Lifetime of Music" within its on-air station idents. These jingles were produced by Alfasound in Sale, Greater Manchester. The package was later re-sung for Great Yorkshire Radio, GNR's sister station.

== Presenters ==
- Roger Kennedy
- Cameron Smith
- Steve Phillips
- Ray Daniels
- Tony Adams
- Freddie Allen
- Dave Porter
- John Mann
- John Warwick
- Bill Young
- Phil Matthews
- Peter Hetherington
- Brian Clough
- Jimmy Savile
- David Hamilton
- Chris Best
- Dave Bray
- Judi Lines
- Gavin McCoy
- Kathy Secker
- Steve Coleman
- Jed Grimes
- Judi Mann
- John Foster
- Anna Belward
- Ray Anderson
