= Hits Radio South Yorkshire =

Radio station in Sheffield, South Yorkshire, England

- Sheffield; United Kingdom
- Broadcast area: South Yorkshire and Chesterfield
- Frequencies: FM: 97.4 MHz (Sheffield and Chesterfield); 102.9 MHz (Barnsley and Rotherham); 103.4 MHz (Doncaster); DAB: 11C
- RDS: HITS SYK
- Branding: South Yorkshire's Hits Radio; The Biggest Hits, The Biggest Throwbacks

Programming
- Format: CHR/Pop
- Network: Hits Radio

Ownership
- Owner: Bauer Media Audio UK
- Sister stations: Greatest Hits Radio South Yorkshire Greatest Hits Radio North Derbyshire

History
- First air date: 1 October 1974; 51 years ago
- Former names: Radio Hallam; Hallam FM
- Former frequencies: 95.2 FM; 95.9 FM; 96.1 FM; 1548 MW

Links
- Webcast: Rayo
- Website: Hits Radio South Yorkshire

Hits Radio South Yorkshire, formerly Hallam FM, is an Independent Local Radio station based in Sheffield, England, owned and operated by Bauer Media Audio UK as part of the Hits Radio network. It broadcasts to South Yorkshire and Chesterfield.

As of September 2024, the station has a weekly audience of 330,000 listeners according to RAJAR.

== History ==
Hallam FM logo used from 2007 to 2015.

The station started broadcasting on 1548 kHz/194m AM, 95.2 and 95.9 MHz FM under the name of Radio Hallam from its studios at Hartshead in Sheffield city centre on 1 October 1974. The first presenter heard on air was ex-BBC Radio 1 DJ Johnny Moran – the first record he played was I've Got the Music in Me by Kiki Dee, which stuck after a minute and a half.

On 1 October 1985, Radio Hallam's broadcast area significantly increased when it began to broadcast to all of South Yorkshire. In 1987, Radio Hallam merged with neighbouring Yorkshire stations Pennine Radio in Bradford and Viking Radio in Hull to form the now-defunct Yorkshire Radio Network.

The frequencies were changed during the 1980s to 96.1 FM for Rotherham, 97.4 FM for Sheffield, 102.9 FM for Barnsley, and 103.4 for the remainder of South Yorkshire. After a take-over in 1990 of the parent company YRN by the Metro Radio Group, the AM frequency became Great Yorkshire Gold. As part of Hallam's licence agreement, the Rotherham transmitter ceased to be used by the station in the 1990s. Hallam also moved its studio facilities to 900 Herries Road, close to Sheffield Wednesday's Hillsborough ground. The office space at Hartshead was formerly used by the Sheffield Star newspaper.

As the Metro Radio Group was bought by EMAP, Hallam FM also became part of the Big City Network in Northern England. In 2011, Bauer Media's Big City Network was replaced by the Place Portfolio, containing the group's local radio stations.

In 2016, Hallam FM was the "Station of the Year" at that year's ARIAS Radio Awards.

From late 2019 until early 2020 Hallam FM's Sheffield studios were shared with sister Yorkshire station Viking FM, following the closure of Viking's studios in Hull. Viking FM was then moved to co-locate with Pulse 1 in Leeds.

=== Hits Radio rebrand ===
On 10 January 2024, station owners Bauer announced Hallam FM would be rebranded as Hits Radio South Yorkshire on 17 April 2024, as part of a network-wide relaunch involving 17 local radio stations in England and Wales. The announcement signalled the end of the Radio Hallam brand after nearly 50 years of broadcasting.

On 20 March 2025, Bauer announced it would end its local Hits Radio breakfast show for South Yorkshire to be replaced by a new national breakfast show for England and Wales on 9 June 2025. Local news and traffic bulletins were retained but the station's Sheffield studios were closed.

The station's final local programme aired on 6 June 2025.

== Broadcasting ==
The station broadcasts on three analogue frequencies. Almost the whole region is covered on 103.4 FM from a transmitter at Clifton, near the M18 as well as on 97.4 FM (Tapton Hill, Sheffield) and 102.9 FM (Ardsley) which boosts reception in Sheffield, Doncaster and Barnsley. The station also broadcasts via DAB on the Bauer Radio South Yorkshire multiplex, and online via their app.

== Programming ==
All Hits Radio network programming is broadcast and produced from Bauer’s London headquarters or studios in Manchester and occasionally Newcastle.

=== News ===
Hits Radio South Yorkshire broadcasts local news bulletins hourly from 6 am–7 pm on weekdays, and from 7 am–1 pm on Saturdays and Sundays. Headlines are broadcast on the half-hour during weekday breakfast and drivetime shows, alongside traffic bulletins.

National bulletins from Sky News Radio are carried overnight with bespoke networked bulletins on weekend afternoons, usually originating from the Hits Radio Leeds newsroom.

=== Big John @ Breakfast ===
Big John @ Breakfast
- Genre: Comedy, Talk, Music
- Running time: 240 minutes
- Country of origin: United Kingdom
- Language: English
- Home station: Hits Radio South Yorkshire
- Starring: "Big" John Harrison; Liesl Soards
- Produced by: James Crookes
- Recording studio: Sheffield
- Original release: 31 August 2000 – 6 June 2025
- Website: https://hellorayo.co.uk/hits-radio/shows/big-john-breakfast-1/

Big John @ Breakfast was the breakfast show on Hits Radio South Yorkshire, and was on air from 2000 to 2025. It was presented by "Big" John Harrison and Liesl Soards, along with producer James Crookes and Big Scottish Jack the famous kilt-clad bodybuilder. The show was broadcast live across South Yorkshire weekdays from 6am to 10am and in its final years was the only locally produced programme on the station. The programme ended on 6 June 2025 and was replaced by a new national breakfast show. During its time on air, the show was recognised by the wider radio industry, most notably as winner of the "Best Breakfast Show" Gold award at the 2002 New York Radio Awards and as "Breakfast Show of the Year" at the 2015 Arqiva Radio Awards. "Big John's Bagpipe Anthems" was a favourite part of the show in its latter years, with Big John playing versions of popular songs on his bagpipes.

== Awards ==
- 2002 New York Radio Awards – "Best Breakfast Show" – Gold
- 2005 Sony Radio Awards – “Promo Award – Get Me To The Church On Time”
- 2015 Arqiva Radio Awards – “Breakfast Show of the Year”
- 2016 ARIAS Radio Awards – “Hallam FM – Station of the Year”
- 2018 ARIAS Radio Awards – “Best Music Presenter at Breakfast” Nomination
- 2020 ARIAS Radio Awards – “Best Music Breakfast Show” Nomination

== Notable past presenters ==
- Steve Banyard
- Ralph Bernard (News & Current Affairs)
- Tom Binns
- Jon Culshaw
- Daryl Denham
- Stephanie Hirst (now at Hits Radio)
- Keith Skues
- Cindy Kent (now at Serenade Radio)
- Stuart Linnell (now at Serenade Radio)
- Scottie McClue (now at Nation Radio Scotland)
- Chris Rogers
- Matthew Rudd (now at Absolute 80s)
- Gerry Kersey
