= Gerry Kersey =

British radio presenter (1938–2025)

Gerry Kersey (1938 – 25 July 2025) was a British radio presenter.

== Life and career ==
Kersey was born in 1938, and grew up on Bellhouse Road at Shiregreen, Sheffield. He began his radio career in 1968 as one of the first presenters for BBC Radio Sheffield.

Outside of radio, Kersey was interested in art, and produced a number of paintings. He died on 25 July 2025, at the age of 86.
