= Northern Lincolnshire =

Part of ceremonial county in England

Northern Lincolnshire describes the northern part of the ceremonial county of Lincolnshire.

For local administration, there are two unitary authorities—North Lincolnshire and North East Lincolnshire—which are separate from Lincolnshire County Council. These two areas were previously part of the county of Humberside, which was created from the historic Parts of Lindsey in Lincolnshire in 1974. Humberside was abolished in 1996 and the two new unitary authorities were established and the area was returned to Lincolnshire for lieutenancy purposes.

Northern Lincolnshire is often used by organisations and in the news to refer to the two areas.

== See also ==
- North Lincolnshire
- North East Lincolnshire
- Northern Lincolnshire and Goole Hospitals NHS Foundation Trust
- Humberside
- South Humberside
- North Lincolnshire (UK Parliament constituency)
