= Greatest Hits Radio Teesside =

Radio programme broadcast in Teesside, England

- Newcastle; United Kingdom
- Broadcast area: Teesside and North Yorkshire
- Frequency: DAB: 11B
- Branding: Across The North East

Programming
- Format: Classic Hits
- Network: Greatest Hits Radio

Ownership
- Owner: Bauer Media Audio UK
- Sister stations: Hits Radio Teesside

History
- First air date: 24 June 1975
- Former names: Radio Tees; Great North Radio; Magic 1170; TFM
- Former frequencies: 1170 MW

Links
- Website: GHR Teesside

Greatest Hits Radio Teesside is an Independent Local Radio station serving Teesside, as part of Bauer’s Greatest Hits Radio network.

== History ==
Originally launched as Great North Radio by the Metro Radio Group in March 1989. The station broadcast on the old Radio Tees AM frequency of 1170 kHz Medium Wave.

In 1996, Emap bought Metro Radio Group and at the start of 1997, Emap decided to scrap Great North Radio and replaced it with local stations under the brand name of Magic, with a new format of Hot Adult Contemporary music. Magic 1170 launched on 19 February 1997. Tom Davies was the first ever voice heard on Magic 1170 and successfully hosted the breakfast show on the station for a number of years.

In December 2001, EMAP decided that it was more economical for the Magic network to share off-peak programmes and in line with the other Magic AM stations began networking between 10a.m.-2p.m., and 7p.m.-6a.m. During these hours it was simply known as Magic, although there were local commercial breaks, and local news on the hour.

In January 2003 after a decline in listening, the station ceased networking with the London station, Magic 105.4, and a regional network was created with Magic 1152 in Manchester at the hub at the weekend and the Newcastle station of the same name during the week. During networked hours, local adverts are aired, as well as a local news summary on the hour together with local traffic and travel in the afternoon.

From July 2006, more networking was introduced across the Northern Magic AM network with only the weekday breakfast (with a running length of four hours) presented from local studios.

Between March 2013 and December 2014, weekday breakfast was a syndicated regional programme from Magic 1152 in Newcastle presented by Anna Foster. On 5 April 2013, the studios in Thornaby ceased broadcasting local programming on sister station TFM.

On 5 January 2015, Magic 1170 was rebranded as TFM 2 as part of a revamp of the Bauer network and all programming is now networked with the other Bauer AM stations in the North although local news, weather and travel continue to be broadcast as opt-outs during the day.

On 7 January 2019, TFM 2 rebranded as Greatest Hits Radio Teesside.

== Programming ==
The station carries primarily a schedule of networked programming, produced and broadcast from Bauer's Manchester, Liverpool, Birmingham and Glasgow studios, and from Bauer's Golden Square headquarters in Soho.

Regional programming consisted (until April 2022) of Night Owls with Alan Robson, airing each Sunday from 10p.m.-2a.m. This was syndicated via the sister station in Newcastle.

=== News ===
Bauer’s Newcastle newsroom broadcasts local news bulletins for Teesside hourly from 06:00 to 19:00 on weekdays and from 07:00 to 13:00 at weekends. Headlines are broadcast on the half-hour during weekday breakfast and drivetime shows, alongside traffic bulletins. National bulletins from Sky News Radio are carried at other times.
