= Hits Radio East Yorkshire & North Lincolnshire =

Radio station in Hull, East Riding of Yorkshire, England

- Leeds; England
- Broadcast area: East Riding of Yorkshire and Northern Lincolnshire
- Frequencies: FM: 96.9 MHz; DAB: 10D
- RDS: Hits
- Branding: The Biggest Hits, The Biggest Throwbacks; Across East Yorkshire & Northern Lincolnshire

Programming
- Format: CHR/Pop
- Network: Hits Radio

Ownership
- Owner: Bauer Media Audio UK
- Sister stations: Greatest Hits Radio East Yorkshire & Northern Lincolnshire

History
- First air date: 17 April 1984; 42 years ago
- Former names: Viking Radio; Viking FM
- Former frequencies: 102.7 FM; 1161 MW

Technical information
- Transmitter coordinates: 53.8031°N 0.5653°W

Links
- Webcast: Rayo
- Website: Hits Radio East Yorkshire & North Lincolnshire

Hits Radio East Yorkshire & North Lincolnshire, formerly Viking FM, is an Independent Local Radio station based in Leeds, England, owned and operated by Bauer as part of the Hits Radio network. It broadcasts to the East Riding of Yorkshire and Northern Lincolnshire. It replaced Viking FM in 2024, 40 years to the day after the station originally launched as Viking Radio.

== Technical ==
96.9 Viking FM logo used from 2009 until 2015.

The station is transmitted from the High Hunsley transmitter on the Yorkshire Wolds, near North Cave, sharing the 200 ft tower with Capital Yorkshire and BBC Radio Humberside, as well as on the Bauer Humberside DAB multiplex from three transmitters, located at nearby Cave Wold, Buckton Barn near Bridlington and Grimsby town centre.

It is also streamed over the Internet via Rayo, making it accessible to listeners from across the United Kingdom. Worldwide webcasting is no longer possible, for licensing reasons.

== History ==
During the application process for its licence, the station's working title was Humber Bridge Radio, but launched as Viking Radio at 6.55am on 17 April 1984 and broadcast on 102.7 FM and 1161 kHz AM (258m Medium Wave). The first on-air presenter was David Fewster and the first song played was Celebration by Kool & the Gang. In spring 1986, the frequency was changed to 96.9 FM, with BBC Radio Humberside, which had occupied this frequency, moving to 95.9 FM.

Viking was the first commercial radio station in the UK to introduce split programming, doing so in the mid-1980s to broadcast rugby league commentary on Sunday afternoons without interrupting The Network Chart Show. The rugby was aired on MW with The Network Chart broadcast on FM. On 31 October 1988, Viking Radio split frequencies on a permanent basis and was transformed into Viking FM on 96.9 FM and Viking Gold on 1161 medium wave. The AM station later became Classic Gold, Classic Gold Radio, Great Yorkshire Gold, Great Yorkshire Radio, Magic 1161 and Viking 2 and finally Greatest Hits Radio East Yorkshire and Northern Lincolnshire until the transmitter was switched off on 26 April 2021.

In October 1990, the Yorkshire Radio Network, which owned Viking as well as Radio Hallam, Pennine Radio (now known as Pulse 1) and Classic Gold, was bought by The Metro Radio Group.

In 1996, the station was bought by EMAP and as a result of a group takeover in 2008, Viking is now owned by Bauer Media Group.

In August 2019, Bauer announced Viking FM would end broadcasting from its Hull studios and co-locate with sister station Hallam FM in Sheffield from Wednesday 2 October 2019, but that it would maintain a local presence in the form of local news, advertising and charity staff. In 2020, Viking FM moved again, this time co-locating with Pulse 1 in Leeds. Pulse itself had also moved to Leeds, in its case from Bradford.

Viking FM logo used from 2015 to 2024.

=== Hits Radio rebrand ===
On 10 January 2024, station owners Bauer announced Viking FM would be rebranded as Hits Radio East Yorkshire & North Lincolnshire from 17 April 2024, as part of a network-wide relaunch involving 17 local radio stations in England and Wales. The announcement signalled the end of the Viking Radio brand after 40 years of broadcasting.

On 20 March 2025, Bauer announced it would end its local Hits Radio breakfast show for East Yorkshire and North Lincolnshire to be replaced by a new national breakfast show for England and Wales on 9 June 2025. Local news and traffic bulletins will continue from the station's Leeds studios.

The station's final local programme aired on 6 June 2025.

== Achievement ==
In 2005, the station won its first Gold Award at the Sony Radio Academy Awards for "Happy Hour"; a news investigation into binge drinking in the region. They won a Bronze award in 2006 for their series of programmes on subjects like ASBO's and street crime.

In 2005, Viking FM's Creative Team (who write and make the adverts) won a Vox Award for a Road Safety ad, in 2006 they won four Vox Awards (Best Campaign, Best Use of Music, Best Media Production and Other) and the London International Awards for Sound Design. In 2007 they achieved a finalist place at the New York Awards and won a United Nations Award for Peace and Human Rights.

== Branding ==
The original logo depicted the station mascot "Eric the Viking", this was phased out in the late 1980s when the logo style was shared with its sister stations. This was later phased out and replaced by the Emap Big City 'splash'; used by many stations on the network. In 2015, the logo was overhauled across the Bauer City network and Viking FM has now adopted the 'Your' logo, in line with branding changes to all Bauer City stations.

Viking's original package was produced by CBC Creative - further idents were made by JAM Creative Productions, Alfasound and Reelworld. Viking went through a stage starting in the late 1990s of only using voice over sweeper production produced in-house, however, in 2006 a new sung package was commissioned, produced by Wisebuddah. In the same year, it commissioned another sung package from JonesTM (now TM Studios).

== Programming ==
All programming on the station is networked and is broadcast and produced from Bauer’s London headquarters or studios in Manchester and occasionally Newcastle.

=== News ===
Hits Radio East Yorkshire and North Lincolnshire broadcasts local news bulletins hourly from 6am-7pm on weekdays, and from 7am-1pm on weekends. Headlines are broadcast on the half hour during weekday breakfast and drivetime shows, alongside traffic bulletins.

National bulletins from Sky News Radio are carried overnight with bespoke networked bulletins on weekend afternoons, usually originating from the Hits Radio newsroom.

== Notable past presenters ==
- Jon Culshaw
- Stephanie Hirst (now with Hits Radio)
- Lucy Horobin
- Jason King (now at Heart London)
- Allan Lake
- Simon Logan (now with BBC Radio Newcastle)
- Karen Petch (deceased)
- Steve Priestley (now with BFBS and Planet Rock)
- Hugh Pym (now with BBC News)
- Joel Ross (now at Rock FM)
- Matthew Rudd (now with Absolute 80s)
- Harriet Scott (now with Magic Radio)
- Tim Shaw
