= Yorkshire Radio Network =

Group of radio stations in England

- Company type: Media
- Industry: Broadcasting
- Headquarters: Sheffield, UK
- Products: Local Radio

The Yorkshire Radio Network was a group of three radio stations which shared programmes in the evening and at weekends. YRN was made-up of Pennine Radio in Bradford, Viking Radio in Hull and Radio Hallam in Sheffield.

== History ==
YRN was based at Hartshead in Sheffield at Radio Hallam, although all of the live programmes came from Studio 2 at Viking Radio in Hull.

The company came about when Radio Hallam merged with Pennine Radio and later took over Viking Radio and the Yorkshire Radio Network began broadcasting on 18 May 1987.

In 1989, it joined the Unlisted Securities Market. Its debut on that market was described as "fantastic".

In 1989, all of the three radio stations' medium wave frequencies were used to form a new service called Classic Gold. YRN was bought by the Metro Radio Group and as Pennine was making a loss they decided to rename it and in August 1991 The Pulse of West Yorkshire was born.

For a while YRN used the overnight sustaining service "The Superstation".

YRN bought Rediffusion Singapore for the sum of S$9 million in July 1989.

In 1990, the Yorkshire Radio Network was bought by The Metro Radio Group and evening networking came to an end at this point, although the overnight show, running between 2am and 5am (6am at the weekend) continued to be a single networked show on all four of the stations which had formed the Yorkshire Radio Network.

== Programming ==
There was live networked programming across the stations each evening broadcast from Viking Radio's studio's at Commercial Road in Hull. The programmes would mostly start after 8pm weekdays and slightly earlier over weekends.

Ad-breaks were not split so it was not unusual to hear promos for Viking whilst you were listening to either Hallam or Pennine. However, both "Benny Brown's American Countdown" and "Rick Dees Weekly Top-40" programmes where bought in and played-out locally by each station, so the commercials were also played separately by the tech-ops at each individual station.

Tim Finlay would often say "we're on more frequencies than you've had hot dinners!", those frequencies before the AM/FM split were 96.1, 96.9, 97.4, 97.5, 102.5, 102.9, 103.2 and 103.4 MHz and 990, 1161, 1278, 1305, 1530 and 1548 kHz.

For a short-time Howard Pressman presented a weekend afternoon show on the network. However, there was no reference to which station it was on other than in the jingles, which were only ever played after the ad-break and fired at each individual station.

== Jingles ==
Each jingle was sung with different endings to ensure each station was fairly represented, for example:

"Latest hits, Greatest hits, Pennine, Hallam and Viking".

"Every hour there's more music power, on Viking, Hallam and Pennine".

"We're with you all the time, Pennine, Hallam and Viking".

"Upfront, In front, Hallam, Pennine and Viking".

This was a remarkably democratic process and was not present with previous packages. The older jingles would either sing "Yorkshire Radio Network" thus, not naming any station at all, or the order of the stations would be "Viking, Pennine and Hallam" this being unfair to Hallam, which was always last.

Each YRN cut was also sung for each individual station with the same melody. This was to ensure one identity throughout each station regardless of the time of day, for example:

"Every hour there's more music power, on Viking F.M".

"Every hour there's more music power, on Pennine F.M".

"Every hour there's more music power, on Hallam F.M".

The memorable YRN news jingle was re-produced several times, however the tune remained the same. This jingle was used on the individual stations. It was formed using the melody used at the start of that of 'Viking Radio' (also that of 'Pennine Radio'), and the end of that of 'Radio Hallam'.

Some of the earlier jingles were sung by soul singer Jimmy Helms. Helms later went on to form the group Londonbeat, they were regular guests on Tim Finlay's evening show, and they even sang him a jingle to the tune of their hit "Failing in love again".

All of the packages were created and written by British jingle production company Alfasound, with the final package being a co-production with United States Company JAM Creative Productions. The YRN 4 jingle package used resings of "Non-Stop Power" - originally created for New York radio station WPLJ.
