= Alfie Joey =

British writer, comic

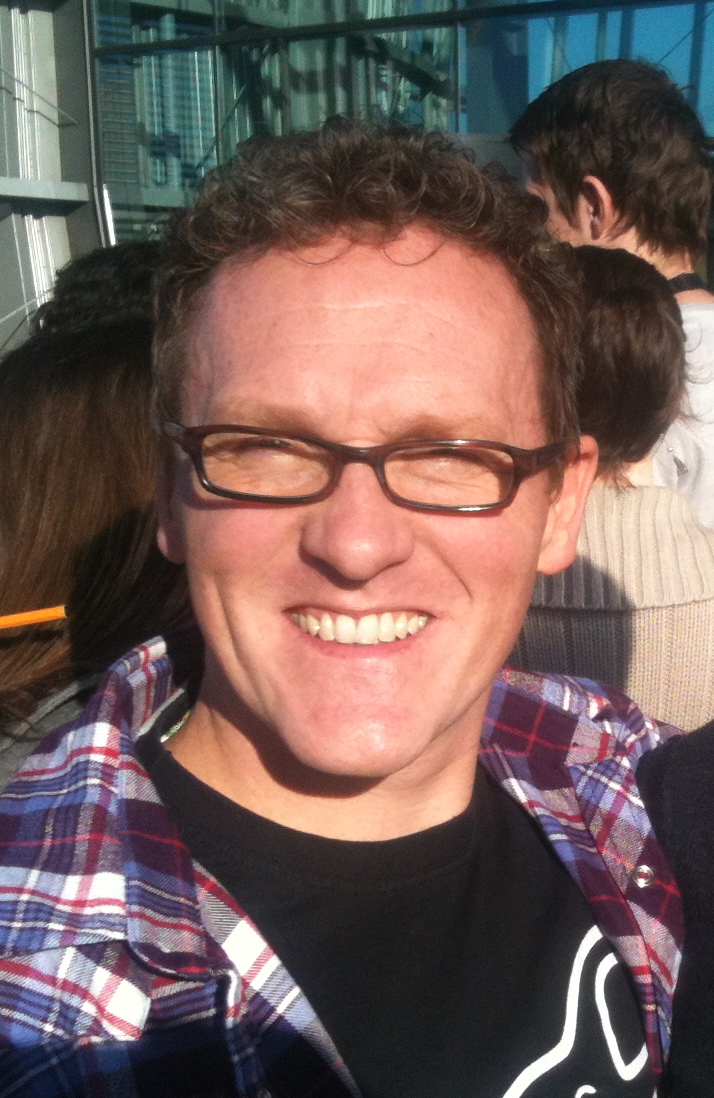
- Joey in 2011
- Born: Peterlee, County Durham
- Education: Middlesex University

Alfie Joey is a British writer, comic and artist/cartoonist. He hosted the breakfast show on BBC Radio Newcastle from 2009, until 28 October 2022.

== Career ==
Alfie Joey hosted the breakfast show on BBC Radio Newcastle from 2009, until his last show on 28 October 2022. On television, he played Vic Reeves’ doctor in the sitcom 'Hebburn'.

Joey appeared in all seven series of 'Ideal,' a BBC sitcom which also starred Johnny Vegas. He is also one half of the comedy impressionist double act The Mimic Men with Cal Halbert.

Joey returned to Edinburgh in 2011 with his new one man comedy musical, 'Monopolise,' which did a short tour of North East theatres and the Liverpool comedy festival. In 2015, at the North East comedy festival, Jesterval, he began performing in a double act, The Mimic Men, alongside Britain's Got Talent impressionist Cal Halbert.

He appeared in the first two series on Mitch Benn's Crimes Against Music on BBC Radio 4 with Robin Ince, first broadcast in 2004 and 2005.

He is a lifelong Sunderland A.F.C. fan. In 2018, Joey appeared in episode 6 of Sunderland 'Til I Die, a Netflix web-series about Sunderland AFC.

He has written and illustrated several books for children, including 'The Last Coal Miner'.

== Awards ==
Joey was nominated for Best Compère at the 2006 Chortle Awards.
