= Hits Radio North East =

- Newcastle upon Tyne; United Kingdom
- Broadcast area: Tyne and Wear, Northumberland and County Durham
- Frequencies: FM: 97.1 MHz (Burnhope); 102.6 MHz (Alnwick); 103.0 MHz (Fenham); 103.2 MHz (Hexham); DAB: 11C
- RDS: HITS_NE
- Branding: The North East’s Hits Radio; The Biggest Hits, The Biggest Throwbacks

Programming
- Format: CHR/Pop
- Network: Hits Radio

Ownership
- Owner: Bauer Media Audio UK
- Sister stations: Hits Radio Teesside; Greatest Hits Radio North East

History
- First air date: 15 July 1974; 52 years ago
- Former names: Metro Radio; Metro FM
- Former frequencies: 97.0 MHz; 1152 kHz

Technical information
- Licensing authority: Ofcom

Links
- Webcast: Hits Radio North East Player
- Website: Hits Radio North East

Hits Radio North East, formerly Metro Radio, is an Independent Local Radio station, owned and operated by Bauer Media Audio UK as part of the Hits Radio network. The station launched in 1974 as Metro Radio. It broadcasts to County Durham, Northumberland, and Tyne and Wear.

As of September 2024, the station has a weekly audience of 338,000 listeners according to RAJAR.

== History ==
Logo used from 2003 to 2015. (A variant used between 2000 and 2003 had a dark blue background)

=== Launch as Metro Radio ===
The Newcastle-based station, broadcasting to North-East England, launched on 15 July 1974. The first breakfast show was presented by Don Dwyer, an Australian radio presenter formerly at ABC and the United Biscuits Network. The first show included messages of congratulations from Kenny Everett at the equivalent local commercial station in London, Capital Radio.

=== Studios ===
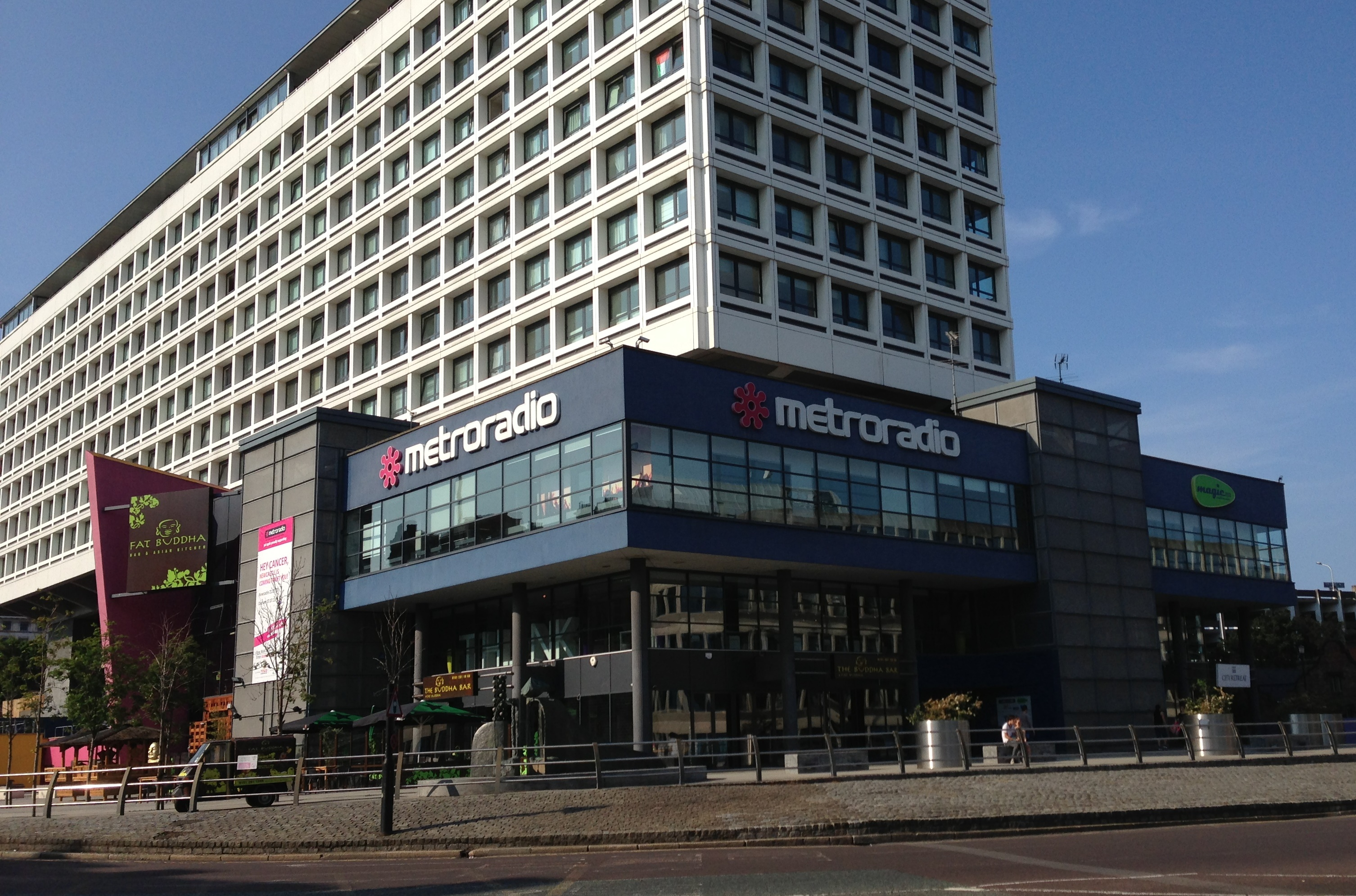
Former home of Metro Radio on the Swan House roundabout in Newcastle upon Tyne. Metro Radio vacated this building in 2021.

The station transmitted from a studio in Swalwell, Gateshead, which in later years would be adjacent to the Metrocentre and is now Metropolitan House—a business centre providing serviced office accommodation. Metro, and sister station Magic 1152, moved in 2005 to the former BT building previously known as Swan House – now known as 55° North – next to the Tyne Bridge in Newcastle upon Tyne. In April 2021, it was announced that Metro Radio were relocating their studios once more. Later in 2021 as planned, they relocated their broadcasting studios to the Grade II listed building, Gainsborough House on Newcastle's Grey Street. Before the move, the studio had undergone a purposed fit-out which included 2 additional studios and a contemporary, flexible office space.

=== Football commentary ===
Until 2005 the station broadcast live football commentary for the region's two biggest clubs; Newcastle United and Sunderland. In an attempt to boost ratings, the football commentary was stopped. However, a negative response from football fans prompted the owners to cover all Newcastle and Sunderland games on sister station Magic 1152.

=== TFM co-location ===
From 8 April 2013, all Metro Radio's programming has been shared with TFM. However, the Metro Radio branding was retained along with separate advertising and local news bulletins. The two stations were able to co-locate without consultation, for the Metro Radio licence area is located in one approved broadcast area (north-east England).

Logo used until 2024.

=== Hits Radio rebrand ===
On 17 April 2024 at 6am, Metro Radio was rebranded to Hits Radio North East, officially marking the end of the end of the Metro Radio brand after nearly 50 years of broadcasting. The website for which had been replaced with the Hits Radio website earlier that morning. The station's local news and regional output was not affected as a result of the relaunch at the time. The rebranding was part of a network-wide relaunch involving 17 Bauer-owned local radio stations in England and Wales.

From 10-14 February 2025, no local breakfast programming was broadcast from studios in Newcastle. Instead, London-based networked programming was relayed. This was partially because of the new Media Act which now allows 24/7 programming from outside the broadcast area, and was the first time that Bauer has used the existing Hits Radio national station's breakfast show as cover, instead of a using a local cover presenter.

On 20 March 2025, Bauer announced it would end its regional Hits Radio breakfast show for the North East to be replaced by a new national breakfast show for England and Wales on 9 June 2025. Local news and traffic bulletins continue and the station's Newcastle studios were retained.

The station's final regional programme aired on 6 June 2025 with breakfast presenters Steve Furnell and Karen Oxley moving to a national breakfast show on sister stations Hits Radio 90s, broadcast from Newcastle.

== Programming ==
Hits Radio network programming is broadcast and produced from Bauer’s London headquarters or studios in Manchester & occasionally Newcastle.

== News ==
Hits Radio North East broadcasts hourly from 6am-7pm on weekdays, and from 7am-1pm on Saturdays and Sundays. Headlines are broadcast on the half-hour during weekday breakfast and drivetime shows, alongside traffic bulletins.

National bulletins from other Bauer newsrooms or Sky News Radio are at other times.

== Notable former presenters ==
- Allan Beswick (later with BBC Radio Lancashire, now retired)
- Rich Clarke (Heart South)
- Mark Goodier (BBC Radio 2)
- Pete Graves (Sky Sports News)
- Ingrid Hagemann
- Rod Lucas (Metro Radio)
- Lucy Horobin (Heart Dance)
- Jason King (Heart London)
- Gabby Logan
- Jonathan Morrell (BBC Radio Newcastle)
- Anna Foster (broadcaster) (BBC Radio Newcastle)
- Jenny Powell (Greatest Hits Radio)
- Alan Robson (later at Greatest Hits Radio, now on the Internet)
- Joel Ross (Rock FM)
- Lisa Shaw (deceased)
- Bill Steel
- Pip Tomson (Good Morning Britain)
- Clive Warren
- James Whale (deceased)
- Russ Williams (Nation Radio UK)
