= Greatest Hits Radio North East =

- Newcastle; United Kingdom
- Broadcast area: North East
- Frequency: DAB: 11C
- Branding: The Good Times Sound Like This; Across The North East

Programming
- Format: Classic Hits
- Network: Greatest Hits Radio

Ownership
- Owner: Bauer Media Audio UK
- Sister stations: Hits Radio North East; Hits Radio Teesside; Greatest Hits Radio Teesside

History
- First air date: March 1989
- Former names: Great North Radio; Magic 1152; Metro Radio 2 Metro 2 Radio
- Former frequencies: 1152 MW

Links
- Website: GHR North East

Greatest Hits Radio North East is an Independent Local Radio station, based in Newcastle, England, owned and operated by Bauer as part of the Greatest Hits Radio network. It broadcasts to North East England.

== History ==
Magic 1152 logo used from 1998 to 2015.

Great North Radio (also known as G.N.R) was formed in March 1989 using the AM frequencies of Metro Radio and Radio Tees. This happened after the Metro Radio Group decided to split the FM and AM frequencies up.

GNR's output consisted of mellow music from the 1950s through to the 1980s, including current hits that fitted the format. There were also specialist programmes each evening, including Country Music, Jazz, and Classical.

In 1996, Emap bought Metro Radio and at the start of 1997, Emap decided to scrap Great North Radio and replaced it with local stations under the brand name of Magic, with a new format of Hot Adult Contemporary music. Magic 1152 launched on 19 February 1998.

In December 2001, Emap decided that it was more economical for the Magic network to share off-peak programmes and in line with the other Magic AM stations began networking between 10am-2pm, and 7pm-6am. During these hours it was simply known as Magic, although there were local commercial breaks, and local news on the hour.

In January 2003, after a sharp decline in listening, the station ceased networking with the London station, Magic 105.4, and a regional northern network was created with Manchester's Magic 1152 at the hub at the weekend and the Newcastle station as the hub during the week. This arrangement remained until 2006, when all network programmes were broadcast from Newcastle. During networked hours, local adverts are aired, as well as a local news summary on the hour during the day. IRN is taken in the evening and overnight.

From July 2006, more networking was introduced across the Northern Magic AM network leaving just the legal minimum of 4 hours a day of programming - the breakfast show - presented from the local studios. All other programming was networked from Newcastle however some is also produced in Manchester and now London.

On 4 March 2013, the one remaining local show - weekday breakfast - became a syndicated regional programme as on this day the programme, presented by Anna Foster, started broadcasting on Teesside sister station Magic 1170. The regional breakfast show was axed in December 2014 ahead of the launch of Metro 2 and all programming is networked with the other Bauer AM stations in the North although local news, weather and travel continue to be broadcast as opt-outs during the day.

On 7 January 2019, Metro 2 rebranded as Greatest Hits Radio North East.

On 12 November 2023, it was announced that the station would be closed on medium wave before the end of the year, but would continue on DAB.

== Programming ==
The station carries primarily a schedule of networked programming, produced and broadcast from Bauer's Manchester, Liverpool, Birmingham and Glasgow studios, and from Bauer's Golden Square headquarters in Soho.

Regional programming consisted of Night Owls with Alan Robson, which was produced and broadcast from Bauer's Newcastle studios, airing each Sunday night until April 2022. This was syndicated with the sister station in Teesside.

=== News ===
Bauer’s Newcastle newsroom broadcasts local news bulletins during some hours. Headlines are broadcast on the half-hour during weekday breakfast and drivetime shows, alongside traffic bulletins. National bulletins from Sky News Radio are carried at other times.

The local news team in Newcastle also produces bulletins for Greatest Hits Radio Teesside.
