= Alfasound =

British radio jingle production company

- Industry: Jingles
- Founders: Alan Fawkes, Steve England
- Defunct: 1997
- Headquarters: Manchester

Alfasound was a radio jingle production company based in Manchester from late 1970s to mid-1990s founded by Alan Fawkes and ex-Piccadilly Radio DJ Steve England.

Alfasound was responsible for some of the most memorable radio jingles in the 80s and 90s, including Piccadilly, the very first jingle set for 96.4 Sound Wave in Swansea. It produced over 10 jingle packages for Radio Trent in Nottingham from 1980 until the station was taken over by GWR Group (later GCap) and re-branded as 96 Trent FM (Now Capital Midlands).

Alfasound also served smaller clients, such as short term stations. In April 1994 a modest package was recorded for Victory FM who became the full-time broadcasters to Greater Portsmouth 1999, with more jingles from Manchester.

Alfasound also sold collectors tapes and CDs to jingle fans which have become sought after items. Through the late 1980s Alfasound also became UK distributors for JAM Creative Productions.

Alfasound (also known as Alfa in the 1990s) closed in 1997. Steve England went on to form his own production company and still makes radio jingles today.
