= Classic Gold =

Radio station network in the UK

Classic Gold was a network of three "Gold" music formatted stations which broadcast on AM in Bradford, Hull and Sheffield. They were the sister stations of Pennine Radio, Viking Radio and Radio Hallam respectively and they were part of the Yorkshire Radio Network.

== History ==
On 31 October 1988, Viking Radio split its frequencies and turned its medium wave service into "Viking Gold", thereby becoming Yorkshire Radio Network's first oldies station. Pennine and Hallam soon followed and Classic Gold launched on 1 May 1989.

For most of its life, Classic Gold was produced with a presenter in Hull, and local 'tech-ops' in Bradford and Sheffield. In Bradford two sets of adverts would be played out - one for Bradford and one for the Halifax/Huddersfield transmitter. Tech-ops were instructed by talk-back from the presenter studio in Hull what the 'out-cue' was going to be. Part of the tech-op's duties was to drive the desk for the news readers - the first three minutes of which were taken by the FM station, while Classic Gold listeners got a full five minutes of news.

A stand-by CD was in satellite studios in case of line failure; in Bradford, Nina Simone's My Baby Just Cares for Me meant the line had gone dead.

In the early 1990s GWR Group, which had just bought 2CR and 210, took YRN's Classic Gold from midnight until 6 am. The name was used in Yorkshire by YRN some 12 months before the GWR Group.

After being taken over by the Metro Radio Group in the early 90s, Classic Gold was relaunched as "Great Yorkshire Radio", and in 1993 as "Great Yorkshire Gold". The station continued in all three areas, even after the sale of the Bradford-based station (along with its FM sister station The Pulse of West Yorkshire) to the Radio Partnership in 1996 due to Radio Authority rules at the time prevented the new owner from owning stations in both Leeds and Bradford due to the significant overlap.

In 1997, promotional trailers began running across all three Great Yorkshire Gold stations saying that they would be soon changing to become Magic, despite the fact that this would not be the case in West Yorkshire, where negotiations were underway to take GWR plc's Classic Gold service. Unhappy with the confusion being caused to listeners, bosses in Bradford decided to create an emergency local service whilst the talks continued with GWR plc and 1278 and 1530 AM West Yorkshire ran for a couple of weeks before GWR's Classic Gold was put to air. The Classic Gold brand continued in West Yorkshire until 2007 (apart from a brief period when the station became Big AM), when it was rebranded as Pulse Gold taking programming from the GCap-owned "Gold" network; being relaunched again the following year (2008) as Pulse 2, which remained on air until 1 September 2020 when the station was replaced with a relay of Bauer-owned Greatest Hits Radio.

== Programming ==
Each station had its own, local breakfast show presenter - in Bradford it was Roger Kirk, in Hull it was Chris Bell and in Sheffield it was Gerry Kersey.

Network programming began at 9.00am, with Alan Ross on mornings, and Keith Skues on lunchtimes. Peter Fairhead was also a regular presenter. Local programmes took over after Drivetime at 7.00pm, with sports programmes and specialist music. For example, on the West Yorkshire frequencies in 1989 there were brass band programmes, cookery descriptions, old dance music, computer technology shows and 'music from the hippy era' presented by Nigel Schofield.

Weekends included a large amount of local programming which on Saturdays included the breakfast show with Terry Pierce and Kenelm James and the morning show with Brian Cooke and Gregory Sammons, Sundays included religious programming with local clergy (Bradford had Martin Short and Daniel Croft as two of their presenters), and sports programming, including rugby league with Iain Williamson and football with Chris Cooper and Dan Aykroyd.

== Branding ==
The Classic Gold jingles were re-sings of classic PAMS jingles, making the station sound more like an offshore pirate of the 60s - a sound familiar to Programme Director Keith Skues - himself a veteran of Radio Caroline and Radio London. The station even had its own version of the "Sonovox waltz" as used by Radio London, this was heard usually every hour just before the news. Alan Ross researched 'Oldies Radio' and the use of jingles, by studying the output of 'Cool 105.9' - a Solid Gold radio station based in Florida.

The Great Yorkshire Radio jingles were re-sings of the Great North Radio package produced by Alfasound, they also used the same slogans. (40 Years of Hits) At this time the station logo used the same font style as its sister station GNR too.

== Former presenters ==
- Phil Butler
- Alastair Cook
- Brian Cooke
- Peter Fairhead
- Tony Francis
- Pat Gibson
- John Harding
- Pete Haslam
- Peter Hetherington
- Tim Jibson
- Gerry Kersey
- Terry Pierce
- Alan Ross
- Dev Ross
- Jimmy Savile
- Keith Skues
- Les Smith
- Mark Smith
- John Uphoff
