= Hits Radio Teesside =

Coordinates: 54°33′32″N 1°18′19″W

- Newcastle upon Tyne; United Kingdom
- Broadcast area: North Yorkshire and County Durham
- Frequencies: FM: 96.6 MHz; DAB: 11B (Teesside)
- RDS: HITS TS
- Branding: The Biggest Hits, The Biggest Throwbacks; Across The North East

Programming
- Format: CHR/Pop
- Network: Hits Radio

Ownership
- Owner: Bauer Media Audio UK
- Sister stations: Hits Radio North East; Greatest Hits Radio Teesside

History
- First air date: 24 June 1975; 51 years ago
- Former names: Radio Tees (1975–1988); TFM 96.6 (1988–98); 96.6 TFM (1998–2007); TFMradio (2007–2013); TFM (2013–2024)
- Former frequencies: FM: 95.0 MHz; MW: 1169 kHz (24 June 1975-23 November 1978), 1170 kHz (23 November 1978-end)

Links
- Webcast: Rayo
- Website: Hits Radio Teesside

Hits Radio Teesside, formerly TFM, is an Independent Local Radio station for Teesside, England, based in Newcastle upon Tyne. The station is owned and operated by Bauer Media Audio UK as part of the Hits Radio network. It broadcasts to areas of County Durham and North Yorkshire.

As of September 2024, the station has a weekly audience of 136,000 listeners according to RAJAR.

== History ==
=== Radio Tees ===
Radio Tees opened at 6 a.m. on Tuesday 24 June 1975, broadcasting on 257 metres medium wave (1,169 kHz) from the converted Water Board buildings at 74 Dovecot Street, Stockton-on-Tees.

The first presenter on air was breakfast show host Les Ross and the first record played was "Everything's Tuesday" by Chairmen of the Board. By the autumn of that year, Radio Tees was also broadcasting on 95 VHF – the first local radio station in the area to broadcast on FM.

By the mid-1980s Radio Tees found itself in financial difficulties, and in 1986, its parent company, Sound Broadcasting (Teesside) Ltd, was bought by Metropolitan Broadcasting (or the Metro Radio Group as it was known, for it owned Metro Radio in Newcastle upon Tyne). In November, that year Radio Tees moved its FM frequency to 96.6 in a direct swap with BBC Radio Cleveland (currently known as BBC Radio Tees). and from this point, evening programming was a relay of Metro Radio in mono - originally their overnight programme, expanding it to include Alan Robson's Night Owls on weeknights and a music show with John Oley on Fridays and by the summer of 86, it was further extended to 7 pm to include Nicky Brown, resulting in Radio Tees being Radio Tees from 7 am to 7 pm and at night, "Metro And Tees Together!".

=== TFM ===
In January 1988, thirteen years after launch, Radio Tees was rebranded to TFM 96.60 after being taken over by Newcastle upon Tyne-based Metro Radio Group. This relaunch also helped modernise the brand. . The evening networking continued for a short time, as "Metro And TFM Together", but just before Easter, TFM became its own station whilst still remaining part of the Metro Radio Group, but, apart from overnight, it no longer broadcast any output from Metro.

In April 1989, its 257 metres/1170 kHz medium wave frequency was split and this became Great North Radio (GNR). This was launched after broadcasting rules meant TFM could not broadcast on both FM and medium wave.

In 1992, TFM vacated its old Dovecot Street studios and moved to new, purpose-built studios in Thornaby-on-Tees. In 1995, Metropolitan Broadcasting was taken over by EMAP; 'TFM' was renamed '96.6 TFM' and brought into EMAP's north of England Independent Local Radio Big City Network.

In July 2007, 96.6 TFM was rebranded TFM Radio and re-adopted the slogan 'Today's Favourite Music' which had first been used in the late 1990s. In 2008, EMAP plc was bought by Bauer Media, a privately owned German-based family business, with the radio group being renamed Bauer Place.

=== Loss of local studios ===
TFM logo used from 2013 to 2015

On Monday 8 April 2013, all programming began to be shared with, and produced by, sister station Metro Radio in Newcastle, although the TFM branding was retained along with separate news bulletins and advertising. The two stations were able to merge without consultation because both the TFM and Metro licence areas are located in one OFCOM-approved broadcast area (North East England). The TFM studios in Thornaby were closed and remaining staff were moved to Newcastle. Most on-air staff were made redundant, including breakfast presenters Wayne Tunnicliffe and Amy McConnell, although two journalists continued to be based locally for news-gathering in the TFM area. Despite the merger, RAJAR reported an increase in weekly listener reach for TFM during the second quarter of 2013.

=== Hits Radio Teesside ===
On 10 January 2024, station owners Bauer announced TFM would be rebranded as Hits Radio Teesside in April 2024, as part of a network-wide relaunch involving 17 local radio stations in England and Wales. The relaunch did not see any changes to the station's local news and regional output.

From 10 to 14 February 2025, no local breakfast programming was broadcast from studios in Newcastle. Instead, London based networked programming was relayed. This is because of the new Media Act which now allows 24/7 programming from outside the TSA.

On 20 March 2025, Bauer announced it would end its regional Hits Radio breakfast show for the North East to be replaced by a new national breakfast show for England and Wales on 9 June 2025. Local news and traffic bulletins continue and the station's Newcastle studios were retained. The station's final regional programme aired on 6 June 2025.

== Programming ==
Hits Radio network programming is broadcast and produced from Bauer’s London headquarters or studios in Manchester & occasionally Newcastle.

== News ==
Hits Radio Teesside broadcasts local news bulletins hourly from 6am-7pm on weekdays and from 7am-1pm on Saturdays and Sundays. Headlines are broadcast on the half hour during weekday breakfast and drivetime shows, alongside traffic bulletins.

National bulletins from Sky News Radio are carried overnight with bespoke networked bulletins on weekend afternoons, usually originating from the Hits Radio Leeds newsroom.

== Notable programmes ==
=== Radio Tees programming ===
Marketing itself as 'A Friend Who's Always Near' and 'The Sound of Home', Radio Tees offered local output with a wide variety of programming and community involvement. Many of its presenters, such as Alastair Pirrie, Mark Page, John Simons, Mark Matthews and Graham Robb, derive from the local area.

Alongside specialist soul, blues and country music shows, Radio Tees programmes included the hi-fi show Sounds Superb, the motoring show Sidelight and the holiday show Trains and Boats and Planes in which Radio Tees presenters would travel to destinations around the world and record reports interviewing local people and giving tourist advice and information.

Radio Tees also met and interviewed artists over the years both in mainstream and specialist music genres including soul music legend Bobby Womack interviewed in 1985 by the then Nightlife show presenter, Mike Prior.

=== Late On ===
A notable programme from the Radio Tees era was Late On, presented by Graham Robb, which ran from 10 pm to 1 am every weekday evening in 1984. The show featured characters such as Rita the cleaner, Mad Tom the handyman, Ginger Johnson (ex-RAF) and Superstar Cecil, the proprietor of 'The Balloon and Feather' pub.

Around the time of Late On, the station briefly experimented with over-the-air software downloads for popular home computers of the time, usually broadcasting them after Robb's show finished at 1am.

=== Event programming ===
Radio Tees reported at local events, broadcasting from the Cleveland and Darlington Shows, the Teesside Air Show and the Teesside Steel Family Gala.

The station often organized its own outside broadcast events as well, many of which took place in John Walker Square, off Stockton-on-Tees High Street. For a few months during 1985, Radio Tees had its own light aircraft for traffic, named Flying Eye, kept at Teesside Airport, from which Graham Robb reported on traffic conditions and which featured daily on John Simons' breakfast show.

== Notable presenters ==
Some former Radio Tees/TFM Radio presenters have gone on to work in the UK national media. These include Mark Page, who briefly worked as a presenter for BBC Radio 1 in the 1980s and Alex Lester, who presented the 3–6 a.m. show on BBC Radio 2 from 1990 to 2016, and then in 2020, joined Greatest Hits Radio where he's currently presenting overnights from 1:00am–6:00am.

The late Alastair Pirrie, 'The Big P on the Big T' – host of afternoon show Pirrie PM, which was part of the opening day's schedule – went on to host cult Tyne Tees TV children's pop show Razzamatazz between 1981 and 1987.

It is in the areas of news and sport that Radio Tees has given well-known figures in the UK broadcasting industry their break, including Jeff Stelling, a Sky Sports presenter until 2023, Helen Boaden, who went on to become Director of BBC News, and Mark Mardell, who went on to become BBC News' Europe Editor and North America Editor.
