= 2008 in British radio =

This is a list of events in British radio during 2008.

== Events ==
=== January ===
- 11 January – Birdsong Radio launches on the Digital One platform following the closure of Oneword. The station features the recording of birdsong, a device first employed in 1992 as a test transmission for Classic FM.
- 12 January –
  - 100.7 Heart FM breakfast presenter Sarah-Jane Mee announces she will leave the show to join Sky News in London. She presents her final programme on 6 March.
  - The Forces Station BFBS begins a trial period of broadcasting nationwide across the UK on DAB from midnight. The trial runs until 23:59 on 31 March 2008, and audience research carried out during this time concludes that it is successful. BFBS subsequently returns to DAB Digital Radio permanently.
- 29 January – Bauer completes its purchase of Emap's radio, television and consumer media businesses, purchasing the assets for £1.14bn.

=== February ===
- Undated in February
  - Classic FM announces a major shake-up of the schedule, which will be rolled out in two parts – weekdays in late February and weekends a month later. Laurence Llewelyn-Bowen and Margherita Taylor join as part of the revamp and former Blur singer Alex James begins presenting a 100-part series called The A to Z of Classical Music. The changes will also see the introduction of a nightly two-hour jazz programme.
  - Huddersfield station Home 107.9 is relaunched as Pennine FM, "The New Pennine FM".

=== March ===
- 17 March – Humphrey Lyttelton retires from BBC Radio 2, having presented The Best of Jazz for the last 40 years.
- 25 March – Rachel New joins Ed James as the new co-presenter of the Breakfast Show on Birmingham's 100.7 Heart FM.

=== April ===
- 28 April – The Heart Network begins simulcasting some of its programmes from Heart 106.2 in London. There are now only ten hours of local programming from 100.7 Heart FM in Birmingham and Heart 106 in the East Midlands during weekdays and four hours on Saturday and Sunday.
- Undated in April – Adrian Van Klaveren replaces Bob Shennan as Controller of BBC Radio 5 Live.

=== May ===
- 3 May – After 14 years on air, Manchester United Radio closes due to the club announcing that they have agreed a deal with local radio station Key 103.

=== June ===
- 3 June – Tony Blackburn's weekend breakfast show on 102.2 Smooth Radio is to be syndicated across the rest of the Smooth network in England from 7 June.
- 30 June – It is announced that Chris Tarrant will return to radio, hosting a weekly Saturday morning show for the GMG Radio's network of stations including London's 102.2 Smooth Radio, Real Radio (Scotland) and the North West's Century Radio. The show will air in direct competition to Jonathan Ross's show on BBC Radio 2. It begins on 26 July.
- Undated in June – The Local Radio Company sells six stations, including Pennine FM which is now independently owned and run.

=== July ===
- 27 July – As part of the BBC Proms season, BBC Radio 3 broadcasts the Doctor Who Prom live from the Albert Hall in London. Before the concert, the Doctor Who mini-episode "Music of the Spheres" receives its premiere.

=== August ===
- 8 August – Thomas Quirk, the former managing director of Saga 105.2 FM (the predecessor to 105.2 Smooth Radio in Glasgow) criticises parent company GMG Radio's decision to sack six local Scottish presenters in favour of increased networking of shows from Smooth stations in London and Manchester. The station had operated a 24-hour schedule of local programming until August 2008.

=== September ===
- Undated in September –
  - An interview on BBC Radio WM between Les Ross and writer and broadcaster Hardeep Singh Kohli is criticised for its awkwardness in the music magazine The Word and in The Guardian newspaper (suggesting that the interview ends up more like an Alan Partridge tribute act). In the interview, Ross ask Singh about his views on self-identity in terms of race; confuses his humorous book on Indian food with a serious radio documentary by Singh discussing genocide during the partition of India; and then mistakenly refers to Singh's book as a TV series. Singh remains polite, if baffled, throughout, before terminating the interview after 4 minutes.
  - After just six months, Classic FM scraps its nightly two-hour jazz programme.
- 10 September – BBC Radio 4 broadcasts the play "Lost Souls", a spin-off from the Doctor Who spin-off Torchwood
- 29 September – Virgin Radio changes its name to Absolute Radio.

=== October ===
- 4 October – BBC7 changes its name to BBC Radio 7.
- 11 October
  - The closure of Channel 4 Radio is announced.
  - Any Questions? broadcasts from Winchester to mark its sixtieth anniversary.
- 14 October – The Radio 4 programme You and Yours undergoes a large change of format, with two presenters being replaced by one. The breadth of topics covered is also extended to global problems as well as those closer to home.
- 16 October – The Russell Brand Show prank calls row: An episode of the Russell Brand Show, co-hosted by fellow Radio 2 presenter Jonathan Ross is recorded for transmission at a later date. The show includes Brand and Ross leaving four prank messages on actor Andrew Sachs's answerphone including offensive remarks about his granddaughter and use of foul language. The programme is subsequently broadcast on Saturday 18 October, partially censored, having passed the various pre-transmission checks from the programme's editors. Initially the programme receives only a negligible number of complaints regarding Ross's bad language; however, after the incident is reported a week later by The Mail on Sunday a public outcry soon ensues. The case is referred to both Ofcom and the BBC Trust and in the interim Ross and Brand are both suspended for 12 weeks from all BBC programmes pending investigation. Soon after these announcements Russell Brand announces his resignation from the BBC shortly followed by Radio 2 controller Lesley Douglas. Jonathan Ross is suspended from the BBC without pay for 12 weeks.
- 27 October – Former ITV Central Tonight presenter Joanne Malin joins BBC Radio WM. She will present a mid-morning show from February 2009.
- 30 October
  - Original 106 is renamed The Coast following the sale of the station two months earlier to Celador.
  - Lesley Douglas's resignation is announced.

=== November ===
- 21 November – London's 102.2 Smooth Radio announces that former BBC Radio Scotland and Pebble Mill presenter Paul Coia will replace Martin Collins as its Drivetime presenter.

=== December ===
- No events.

== Station debuts ==
- 8 January – 97.5 Smooth Radio
- 11 January – Birdsong Radio (2008–2009)
- 28 January – City Talk 105.9
- 15 February – Phonic FM
- 18 February – Exeter FM
- 15 March – Swindon 105.5
- 26 March – Oak FM
- 1 April – Rock Radio (North East)
- 4 April – Touch FM (Warwick)
- May – Andover Sound
- 5 May – 106.1 Rock Radio
- 2 June – Q Radio
- 16 June – Nation Radio
- 24 June – NME Radio (2008–2013)
- August – Rhubarb Radio
- 9 August – South Birmingham Community Radio
- 14 October – Radio Hartlepool
- 30 October – The Coast (radio station)
- 5 November – Focal Radio (2008–2009)
- 8 November – The Bay 102.8
- 7 December – 106.5 Central Radio
- Unknown – Celtic Music Radio
- Unknown – Somer Valley FM

== Programme debuts ==
- 11 January – The Penny Dreadfuls Present... on BBC Radio 4 (2008–2009)
- 26 February – Rudy's Rare Records on BBC Radio 4 (2008–2014)
- 2 July – Cabin Pressure on BBC Radio 4 (2008–2014)
- 23 August – Miranda Hart's Joke Shop on BBC Radio 2 (2008)
- 29 September – Geoff Lloyd's Hometime Show (Geoff Lloyd with Annabel Port from 2015) on Virgin Radio (Absolute Radio from 2009) (2008–2017)
- 1 October – The Media Show on BBC Radio 4 (2008–Present)
- 27 October – The Strand on the BBC World Service (2008–2013)
- 27 November – Act Your Age on BBC Radio 4 (2008–2010)

== Relaunching this year after a break of one month or more ==
- 8 October – Jazz FM (relaunched)

== Continuing radio programmes ==
=== 1940s ===
- Sunday Half Hour (1940–2018)
- Desert Island Discs (1942–Present)
- Woman's Hour (1946–Present)
- A Book at Bedtime (1949–Present)

=== 1950s ===
- The Archers (1950–Present)
- The Today Programme (1957–Present)

=== 1960s ===
- Farming Today (1960–Present)
- In Touch (1961–Present)
- The World at One (1965–Present)
- The Official Chart (1967–Present)
- Just a Minute (1967–Present)
- The Living World (1968–Present)
- The Organist Entertains (1969–2018)

=== 1970s ===
- PM (1970–Present)
- Start the Week (1970–Present)
- You and Yours (1970–Present)
- I'm Sorry I Haven't a Clue (1972–Present)
- Good Morning Scotland (1973–Present)
- Newsbeat (1973–Present)
- File on 4 (1977–Present)
- Money Box (1977–Present)
- The News Quiz (1977–Present)
- Feedback (1979–Present)
- The Food Programme (1979–Present)
- Science in Action (1979–Present)

=== 1980s ===
- Steve Wright in the Afternoon (1981–1993, 1999–2022)
- In Business (1983–Present)
- Sounds of the 60s (1983–Present)
- Loose Ends (1986–Present)

=== 1990s ===
- The Moral Maze (1990–Present)
- Essential Selection (1991–Present)
- Wake Up to Wogan (1993–2009)
- Essential Mix (1993–Present)
- Up All Night (1994–Present)
- Wake Up to Money (1994–Present)
- Private Passions (1995–Present)
- The David Jacobs Collection (1996–2013)
- Sunday Night at 10 (1998–2013)
- In Our Time (1998–Present)
- Material World (1998–Present)
- Scott Mills (1998–2022)
- The Now Show (1998–Present)
- Jonathan Ross (1999–2010)

=== 2000s ===
- BBC Radio 2 Folk Awards (2000–Present)
- Big John @ Breakfast (2000–Present)
- Go4It (2001–2009)
- The Jo Whiley Show (2001–2011)
- Kermode and Mayo's Film Review (2001–2022)
- The Big Toe Radio Show (2002–2011)
- A Kist o Wurds (2002–Present)
- Fighting Talk (2003–Present)
- Jeremy Vine (2003–Present)
- The Chris Moyles Show (2004–2012)
- Annie Mac (2004–2021)
- Elaine Paige on Sunday (2004–Present)
- Chris Evans Drivetime (2006–2009)
- The Bottom Line (2006–Present)
- The Christian O'Connell Breakfast Show (2006–Present)
- The Unbelievable Truth (2006–Present)
- The Radcliffe and Maconie Show (2007–Present)

== Ending this year ==
- 28 January – Jammin' (2001–2008)
- 27 March – Sounds of the 70s (2000–2008, 2009–Present)
- 25 September – The Geoff Show (2006–2008)
- 25 October – The Russell Brand Show (2006–2008, 2010, 2013, 2017)

== Closing this year ==
Date	Station	Debut
11 January	Oneword	2000
11 January	Core Radio	1999
26 March	Fosseway Radio	1998
26 March	Oak 107 FM	1999
26 March	theJazz	2006
26 March	Capital Life	1999
4 April	Virgin Radio Groove	2000
3 May	Manchester United Radio	1994
31 July	Fen Radio 107.5	1999
23 December	Talk 107	2006

== Deaths ==
- 20 May – Margot Boyd, 94, actress
- 30 July – Peter Coke, 95, actor
- 29 August – Geoffrey Perkins, 55, comedy producer
