= Real Radio XS (Digital) =

England
- Broadcast area: Yorkshire, Central Scotland, North West England
- Frequencies: DAB and online

Programming
- Format: Classic Rock

Ownership
- Owner: GMG Radio
- Sister stations: 106.1 Real Radio XS, Real Radio, Smooth Radio

History
- First air date: 1 April 2008 (as Rock Radio); 5 September 2011 (as Real Radio XS)
- Last air date: 2016

Links
- Website: http://www.realradioxs.co.uk

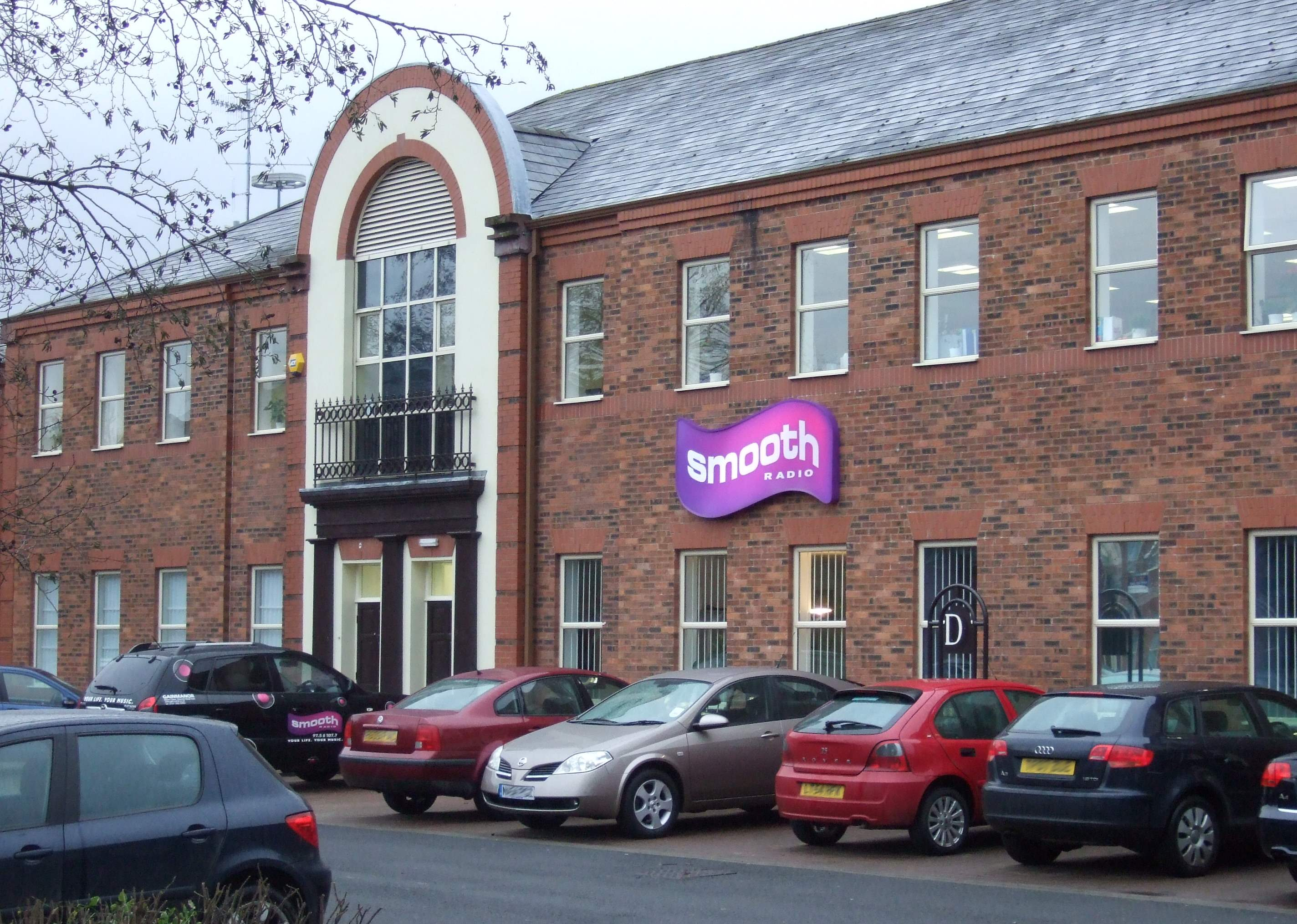
GMG Radio's studios in Team Valley, Gateshead, which Rock Radio shared with Smooth Radio and Real Radio during the era of local North East content

Real Radio XS (branded Rock Radio prior to September 2011) was a classic rock independent local radio service broadcast on DAB in various parts of the United Kingdom. It was formerly part of the Rock Radio group of stations owned by GMG Radio, and whilst initially a separate station, latterly carried programming sourced from 106.1 Real Radio XS in Manchester.

When first launched, the digital service was known as Rock Radio North East, and was a dedicated digital-only service for the region which had its own programmes presented locally, broadcast from the complex at the Team Valley that also accommodated the group's regional FM stations Real Radio (North East) and 97.5 Smooth Radio. Breakfast was presented every morning (7am - 12noon) by Mark Gregory; John Kirby would present the weekday "drivetime" programme (2-7pm); and Kelly Scott would present evenings from 7pm until 12midnight. From noon until 2pm was an "automated" non-stop music programme known as "The Rock Block"; overnight (midnight to 7am) was also automated. The station did not broadcast news bulletins; instead, an hourly jingle gave a time check in the format of: "Rock Radio. The station where no news is good news. It's 8 o'clock. Let's Rock".

Just over a year after it launched, the local programming stopped without any explanation and the service instead broadcast a continuous "automation" service. With the exception of Mark Gregory, the main weekday presenters would later be heard on sister service Real Radio (North East). The only local opt-outs for the North East during the automation period would come in the form of off-peak news bulletins and local advertisement breaks.

In June 2009, the northeast frequency started relaying the Manchester 106.1 Rock Radio service with no local opt-outs.

In September 2009, Glasgow sister service 96.3 Rock Radio began to share some off-peak programming with 106.1 Rock Radio in Manchester, with live networked programming largely replacing voice-tracked local programming in outside-of-peak slots: only breakfast and drivetime are split, with the digital service taking Manchester's output during split programmes.

In October 2010, changes were made to GMG's digital radio lineup in tandem with the relaunch of Smooth Radio as a national station on the Digital One network. In areas served by Smooth on FM, a local Smooth was retained on DAB for the carriage of remaining locally opted-out content in addition to the national output. However, this was not required in Severn Estuary and Yorkshire, where Smooth was unavailable on FM, and the DAB service to these areas was a relay of Smooth from London. As a result, GMG removed Smooth from these regional multiplexes and replaced it with a relay of Rock Radio, again based principally on the Manchester version.

On 5 September 2010, Rock Radio (Digital) was relaunched as Real Radio XS, tied in with the relaunch of the Manchester 106.1 FM service under that name. In addition to taking the Rock Radio slots in Yorkshire, Severn Estuary and North East, Real Radio XS was also introduced in place of Jazz FM (UK) on DAB on CE London and on the MXR regional ensembles in the West Midlands and the North West - in the process giving the station DAB coverage in its FM coverage area for the first time. (Jazz FM had become available nationally via Digital One at this point.) The Manchester and Glasgow services were split off, with Glasgow's service retaining the name 96.3 Rock Radio, with the intention that it would be sold off, and continue to broadcast to Glasgow on FM and DAB as an independent station, with GMG operating Real XS from Manchester; however, GMG subsequently took the Glasgow station off the market and confirmed that it would relaunch as 96.3 Real Radio XS in late October 2011. Outside Scotland, however, the digital Real XS service continued to be based primarily on the Manchester FM output, as previously.

Real XS was withdrawn from DAB in London in June 2012. Carriage of the station in most other DAB areas, including the North-West, ended during 2013 with the cessation of most MXR regional multiplex licences. This left 106.1 Real XS broadcasting only to Yorkshire on DAB. (FM transmission was unchanged.) The Yorkshire broadcast was withdrawn in 2014, ahead of the MXR multiplex closing the following year, leaving only the Manchester FM service.

The purchase of GMG Radio by Global, completed in 2014, saw ownership of Real XS and several other stations transferred to Communicorp, and also led to the rebranding of the Real Radio network stations as Heart from May 2014, and the relaunch of 96.3 Real XS (broadcast to Paisley on FM and central Scotland on DAB) as Xfm Scotland. 106.1 Real Radio XS continued to operate under that name until a relaunch as XS Manchester in 2016. The station continued to broadcast terrestrially to Manchester (and was nationally available online), with all programming produced locally until 2025, when its frequency was given over to Radio X 90s.
