= Century Network =

Former group of local radio stations in England

- Company type: Subsidiary – GMG Radio
- Industry: Broadcasting
- Founded: 1994
- Defunct: 2009
- Headquarters: UK
- Products: Independent Local Radio
- Owner: GMG Radio

Century Radio was the brand name of a group of Independent Local Radio stations in England. The brand was developed with the launch of 100-102 Century Radio in North East England in 1994, with John Myers as managing director and John Simons as programme director. The brand grew when Myers launched Century 106 for the East Midlands, and further when 105.4 Century Radio was launched in North West England in 1998. Ocean FM used the Century format, but not the brand.

The group was initially owned by Border Radio Holdings until 2000, when Capital Radio Group took over the brand. When the larger GCap Media acquired the group in 2005, they were forced to sell the Nottingham-based "106" station to Chrysalis Group for competition reasons. GMG Radio, with Myers and Simons as senior executives, bought the stations in 2006. They were rebranded Real Radio to conform to the branding and network programming of the other stations in the Real Radio network that Myers had developed since in 2000.

The stations were very successful using their 'radio you just have to sing along to' format, but later RAJAR figures showed a decline in market reach and market share.

The head offices were based at Salford Quays, along with the studios of Century's north west station, 105.4 Century Radio. In addition, the building also accommodates GMG Radio's sales division, and has completed building work to fit in sister station Smooth Radio and newly launched Rock Radio.

== History ==
It was established by John Myers and John Simons of Border Radio Holdings, a subsidiary of Border Television. The brand was later expanded to two further stations in North West England and the East Midlands.

In 2000, ownership of the stations was transferred to Capital Radio Group, when Capital Radio Group bought Border Television. The buy-out was largely seen as Capital attempting to gain control of Century and its three regional licences, especially when Border Television itself was rapidly sold on to Granada Media Group.

Under the ownership of Capital the stations were subtly rebranded from Century Radio to Century FM. There was also a transfer away from the sixties, seventies, eighties, and nineties music format, which clashed with Capital's Capital Gold brand, to a more modern music format. The south-coast based Ocean FM also took the "Century Format" but did not take the Century brand name.

With the merger of Capital and GWR in 2005, the Century brand became part of GCap Media, however, the terms of the merger forced the sale of 106 Century FM to Chrysalis Group. Under the ownership of Chrysalis Group, 106 Century FM relaunched as Heart 106 at Midnight on Friday 26 August 2005. Later in 2005, Ocean FM also began to move away from the Century format dropping Century branding, straplines, and networked programming for a more individual approach.

Finally, on 18 October 2006, it was announced that the two remaining Century stations had been sold to GMG Radio. Perhaps ironically, GMG Radio was run by Myers and Simons who created the original Century brand in 1994.

In December 2006, Century Digital ceased broadcasting on Sky Digital channel 0113 and was replaced with theJazz.

Century Digital was replaced by Real Radio on DAB, a GMG Radio brand, in London on 23 March 2007, leaving Birmingham as the only area with Century Digital available, it finally closed a few days later. In 2008, Century FM changed its name to Century Radio and adopted a new logo, matching that of sister station Real Radio. On 31 March 2009, after over 14 years of using the Century name, Century Radio was renamed Real Radio to fit in with the branding and network programming of the other stations in the Real Radio network.

== Century branded stations ==
- 100-102 Century Radio (North East England)
- 105.4 Century Radio (North West England)
- Century 106 (East Midlands)
- Ocean FM (South Hampshire, West Sussex and Isle of Wight)
