= Colin Lamont =

Scottish radio broadcaster

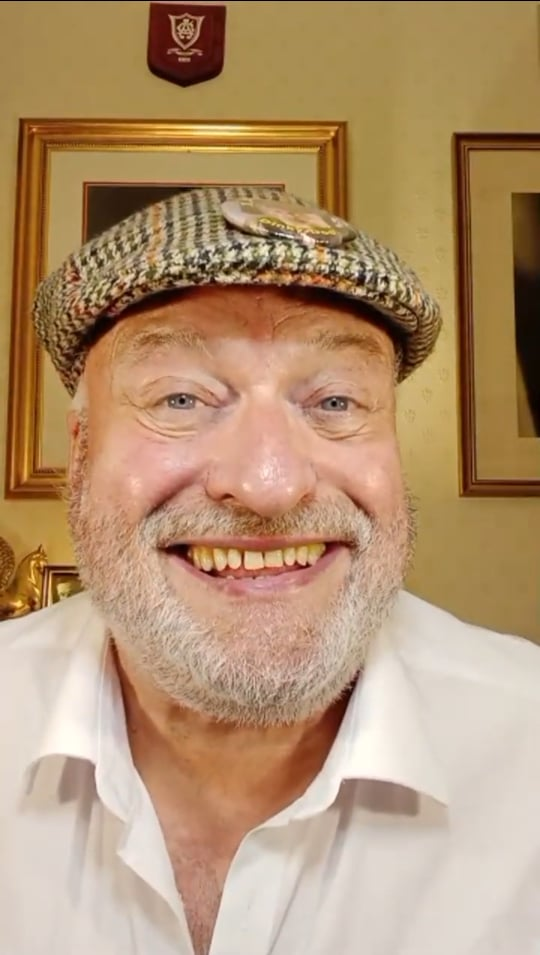
- Lamont as Scottie McClue in 2021
- Born: 20 June 1956 (age 70); Greenock, Renfrewshire, Scotland
- Education: Royal Conservatoire of Scotland
- Occupations: Radio presenter and executive

Colin Lamont (born 20 June 1956), better known by his shock jock on-air radio persona of Scottie McClue, is a broadcaster and former newscaster.

== Career ==
Lamont was educated at Greenock Academy, the University of Glasgow, the Royal Scottish Academy of Music and Drama (now the Royal Conservatoire of Scotland) and Jordanhill College of Education, where he trained as a secondary school teacher.

He started his career working as a trainee manager for the Clydesdale Bank before joining Scottish Opera in 1980. His roles including Touring Manager, Marketing Officer and Director of Education Programmes, working alongside directors John Cox and Graham Vick. In 1981 he became Assistant General Manager at Pitlochry Festival Theatre.

In 1984 he became a continuity announcer and newscaster for Grampian Television in Aberdeen, before moving to Scottish Television in Glasgow (1985–88) and Border Television in Carlisle (1985–89)

In September 1989 Lamont set up the radio station CentreSound 96.7 in Stirling - now Central FM - as its founding managing director. In 1992 he moved to Red Rose Gold in Preston to become a senior producer and presenter for the station, creating the on-air persona Scottie McClue. McClue became a controversial but highly popular figure, attracting substantial listening audiences and subsequently presenting on a variety of UK stations across Scotland (including Scot FM and Q96), the North East of England, the North West of England, Yorkshire and the Midlands, including national station Talk Radio UK in London and in syndication throughout the UK over the next twenty-five years.

In August 2008, he became a shareholder of the Scottish independent local radio station L107 saving it from imminent closure as the former owner, Mark Page, was on the brink of returning the licence to Ofcom. Businessman Alan Shields acquired the station from Page, hiring Lamont as a presenter under his Scottie McClue persona. Lamont invested more than £62,000 of his own money into the business. Lamont left the station accusing Shields of failing to contribute his share of funding.

== Scottie McClue ==
Lamont has hosted talk radio shows in the persona of Scottie McClue since the 1990s.

When Lancashire independent radio station Red Rose Radio was split into two frequencies, Programme Director John Myers wanted distinctive programming for the medium wave service, Red Rose Gold. Myers encouraged Colin Lamont to present the station's late-night phone-in. They believed, however, that the name 'Colin' did not connote showbusiness. Inspired by Scottie Buccleugh, the host of a weekly children's film club in Carlisle known as 'Uncle Scottie', Myers suggested that Lamont's on-air identity should be 'something mad like this' that would be memorable. The pair eventually came up with Scottie McClue.

In 1994 McClue moved to Scot FM in Edinburgh, to present a new late night phone in. He was fined by the Radio Authority on one occasion for breaching the 1990 Broadcasting Act on taste and decency, in comments made about single mothers and gay people. In January 1997 McClue left the station after talks about a new contract broke down and moved to Hallam FM in Sheffield and by April 1998, his show was syndicated across TFM in Middlesbrough and all Magic stations then owned by EMAP in Liverpool, Yorkshire and North East England.

McClue also presented on Border Television-owned stations including 100-102 Century FM in Newcastle becoming the late night phone-in presenter on its Salford Quays-based sister regional station 105.4 Century FM, when it launched in September 1998, with his show being networked to cover The Midlands on Century 106 in Nottingham in 1999.

In 2001 McClue returned to Scotland on Q96 with his shows being simulcast and networked across the UK. He then returned to EMAP's Magic stations in Sheffield, Liverpool, Leeds and Hull also broadcasting for SRH on Clyde 2 Glasgow on Saturday evenings and Forth 2 Edinburgh on Sunday mornings and also a stint co-hosting with Lesley Riddoch sitting in for Fred MacAulay on BBC Radio Scotland.

McClue had, as analyst Mary Talbot observes, achieved "a degree of infamy as a highly confrontational talk radio host". Scottie joined Q96 in 2006, before moving to its 24-hour talk radio sister station of Talk 107, later that year. He remained as a presenter until March 2008 where Talk 107 replaced him with a simulcast of The James Whale Show from London on sister station Talksport.

In July 2008 McClue participated in a special edition of BBC Radio's Fighting Talk at the Radio Academy's Radio Festival in Glasgow.

McClue also presented on many mainstream Scottish radio stations including Radio Forth & Radio Clyde. From 2008, he worked on L107 where he also served in a shareholder and management role at the station. The station lasted just over a year until reported company debts caused an ownership dispute which led to the breakdown of the partnership, and McClue's withdrawal from the station's output.

A live video, "An Audience With Scottie McClue" was released in 1996. While working with Century 105 in Salford in 1999, he also released a CD called The Best of Scottie McClue.

In September 2018, McClue joined Nation Radio Scotland to present a late night phone-in show which aired three nights a week. Since his absence from the radio, McClue has been live streaming daily on TikTok. He started throughout the COVID-19 outbreak.
