= John Myers (radio executive) =

British radio executive, consultant and presenter

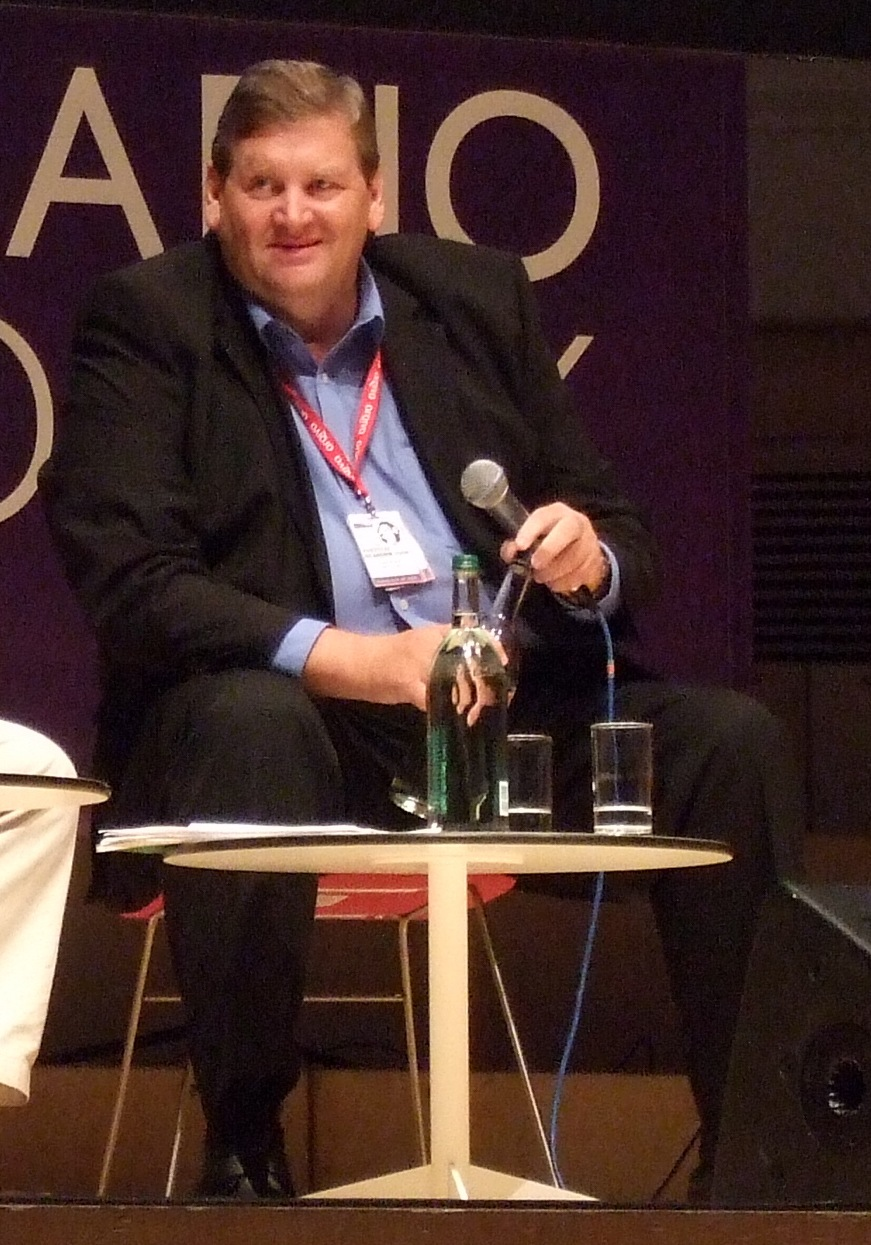
- John Myers at the Radio Festival 2008
- Born: 11 April 1959; Carlisle, Cumberland, England, United Kingdom
- Died: 1 June 2019 (aged 60)
- Other name: John Morgan (on-air pseudonym)
- Occupation: Radio executive
- Partner: Linda
- Website: www.myersmedia.co.uk

John Myers (11 April 1959 – 1 June 2019) was a British radio executive, consultant and presenter. He was chairman of the UK Radio Academy Awards, The Commercial Radio Awards and owner of Myers Media. Myers developed the Century Radio brand for Border Radio Holdings in the early 1990s, launching two more stations later in the decade. He presented programmes under the pseudonym "John Morgan". He then became chief executive of GMG Radio, developing the Real Radio, Smooth Radio and Rock Radio brands and overseeing GMG Radio's acquisition of the Century network from GCap Media. He was chief executive of The Radio Academy from April 2011 to June 2012 and the founding c hairman of TeamRock, retiring in May 2016.

In 2009, he was asked by the Labour Government to produce a report on the future of local radio in the UK ("The Myers Report") which was published by the Department for Culture, Media and Sport in April 2009. A number of his recommendations were taken up by the Digital Economy Act 2010, leading to, amongst others, mergers within the Heart and Smooth Radio networks. Myers reviewed efficiencies at four BBC radio stations during the first quarter of 2011 and, in late 2011, began reviewing BBC Local Radio stations in response to the Delivering Quality First cuts.

== Early career ==
Myers started his radio career in 1980 as a Station Assistant for BBC Radio Cumbria. He was the station's first country music presenter while also presenting and producing a number of music programmes. He became a presenter in 1982 for Red Rose Radio and then, Radio Tees in 1984. In 1989 he became the programme controller and breakfast presenter for Red Rose Gold.

While also in radio, he joined Border Television as a continuity announcer and programme presenter in 1985, and developed the long running Border Birthdays slot with a puppet called Eric the Monkey. He remained in television presentation for four years returning to Red Rose Radio in 1989. He became managing director of Border Radio Holdings in 1993, launching their independent local radio station, CFM. Myers presented the breakfast programme, the Friday night phone-in and a Sunday lunch-time programme, called 'fun on the phones'.

== Century Radio ==
In September 1994, he launched Century Radio in North East England. He again presented the breakfast show, this time under the pseudonym of John Morgan. Myers later released a compilation cassette of the wind-ups from his show, and even a novelty single, called "Three Rosettes", under the further pseudonym of Mr Martin. He also co-presented other shows, such as the Sunday lunch time "Fun on the Phones".

During this time he also presented segments on Tyne Tees Television's magazine show. Ratings fell when Myers stepped down from presenting the breakfast show, and his replacement, Steve Coleman, was sacked after just three weeks. Myers returned for another 12 months until Paul Gough replaced him in 1997.

In 1997 Myers left the North East to launch 106 Century FM in the East Midlands. A year later the BBC television fly on the wall documentary Trouble at the Top followed the launch of 105.4 Century FM in North West England.

== GMG radio (1999–2008) ==
Myers moved to Guardian Media Group (GMG) after the group announced plans to enter the commercial radio business. Sir Robert Phillis, the former GMG chief executive, enlisted Myers to establish GMG's radio division after seeing him on the documentary programme Trouble at the Top.

Myers became managing director of GMG Radio in 1999, winning the first licence for GMG, Real Radio (Wales), which launched in 2000. Myers resurrected the "Fun on the Phones" presenting as John Morgan, with John Simons occasionally presenting. The breakfast show was presented by Terry Underhill and Sarah Graham in the first few years of the station.

He became chief executive of GMGR in 2002, and joined the board of directors of the Guardian Media Group in 2006. In October 2006, GMG Radio bought the two remaining Century stations from GCap, bringing Myers to control the brand he started in 1994. During his nine years with the company, it was awarded four licences and made the purchase of: Scot FM from the Wireless Group; JAZZ FM; Paisley's Q96 from UTV; the two Century FM stations from GCap; and four Saga Radio stations.

In March 2007 he oversaw the launch of the Smooth Radio brand, the UK's first mainstream commercial stations to target the 40- to 59-year-old adult. The five existing Smooth FM and Saga stations were rebranded as Smooth Radio and the group launched the sixth station under this brand in North East England in January 2008. This was quickly followed by the launch of the group's second Rock Radio station in Manchester in May 2008. In December '08, GMGR was awarded the North Wales licence, which will allow Real Radio to be the first national commercial station in Wales.

In 2008 Myers convinced the GMG board to invest £1m in documentaries, a first for commercial radio, which were aired across the GMG network (apart from the Scottish stations). He stepped down from his role at GMG Radio to travel the world.

== Later ==
In January 2009, he was asked by the Labour Government to undertake a review of commercial radio in the UK, which was published in April 2009. To stop a high percentage of commercial radio stations losing money, Myers recommended that regulators could remove the imperative for local radio to be produced from within a geographic boundary; tailored news feeds alluding to a geographic area could be produced from one big building. A number of his recommendations were taken up within the Digital Britain report and the Digital Economy Act 2010. The changes led to Smooth Radio merging its five England stations into one quasi-national station, with local news feeds produced from GMG Radio's headquarters in Salford Quays, and Global Radio halving the number of its Heart stations through co-local content.

Myers was appointed chairman of Radio Tyneside, a hospital radio station serving patients in Newcastle upon Tyne and Gateshead, in July 2010.

In November 2010, he was asked by the BBC to review efficiency at Radio 1, 1Xtra, 6 Music and Radio 2; this project is expected to conclude in March 2011. The Telegraph reported that the BBC needed to hire someone with expertise in commercial radio, but was not a "BBC hater". In late 2011, the BBC commissioned Myers to produce a report on how the corporation's local radio stations can best adapt to the Delivering Quality First (DQF) budget cuts. BBC English Regions said that Myers was to "advise us on how we can maximise productivity and deliver efficiency savings across local radio."

He assumed his role as Chief executive of The Radio Academy in April 2011, and left the role in June 2012. Through his company Myers Media he occasionally returned to the airwaves under his radio name of John Morgan. He joined Spectrum FM, an unlicensed or "pirate" radio station in Spain as a consultant and presenter of a weekly Sunday morning show.

In 2012, he became a visiting professor at the University of Cumbria; the institution also awarded him an honorary fellowship.

His autobiography, TEAM – It's only radio, was published in October 2012.

== Awards ==
Myers was awarded a Fellowship in 2005 by The Radio Academy for his contribution to radio. In 2010 he was presented with an outstanding achievement award by The Radio Centre in recognition of his long service to commercial radio. He is a former board director of the RadioCentre, the Sony Radio Academy Awards Committee, and a past Chairman of The Radio Academy until March 2009. He was one of just 40 people inducted into the Radio Centre roll of honour in 2012.

== Personal life ==
Myers has two children Kerry and Scott, and two grandchildren Mia and Marcus. Scott was a producer at Galaxy FM until 2007 and moved on to become the network producer for GMG in Salford. He was the producer of Capital Yorkshire's breakfast show, until September 2013 when he left to set up his own businesses.

Myers' death was announced on 2 June 2019.
