= XFM Manchester =

Former British radio station

Radio X Manchester
England
- Broadcast area: North West England
- Frequencies: 97.7 MHz; DAB: 11C

Programming
- Format: Alternative music

Ownership
- Owner: Global Radio

History
- First air date: 15 March 2006
- Last air date: 13 September 2015 as XFM

Technical information
- Transmitter coordinates: 53.4802°N 2.2386°W

Links
- Website: www.xfmmanchester.co.uk

XFM Manchester was an Independent Local Radio station broadcasting alternative and indie music to Manchester in North West England.

It built on the brand and format established by XFM London. The majority of programming was shared but some was produced specifically for Manchester. At its launch in 2006 it was owned by GCap Media, and later became part of the Global Radio group.

In September 2015, the station was replaced, along with XFM London, by Radio X.

== Launch ==
XFM Manchester was awarded a 12-year (until 2017) FM radio licence on 9 June 2005, beating 18 rival bids. Established local radio presenter Terry Christian was cited in the licence application document but he remained at the relaunched BBC Radio Manchester.

Before its launch 20 February 2006, XFM Manchester began occasional technical test transmissions consisting of a playlist of songs chosen to appeal to its audience. XFM Manchester was officially launched at 8 am on 15 March 2006. A collage of Manchester related clips was played, and I Am the Resurrection by The Stone Roses, and Song 2 by Blur. The first presenter on air was Paul Tonkinson with guest Shaun Ryder of the Happy Mondays. Launch events were held all day across Manchester, including a world record attempt in Albert Square hosted by Bez to shake the most number of maracas at any one time.

Some presenters were formerly members of Manchester bands and institutions, including Inspiral Carpets' keyboard player Clint Boon, Elbow's frontman Guy Garvey, The Smiths' bass player Andy Rourke, Factory Records boss Tony Wilson, and The Haçienda's Dave Haslam.

== Transmitter and studios ==
XFM was initially broadcast from studios at Laser House in Salford Quays, the same building as Century 105.4. But after Century was sold by GCap Media to GMG in late 2006, the two stations ceased to share resources, and XFM Manchester moved to studios at the nearby Exchange Quay, also in Salford. After Global Radio acquired the station, it moved the operations of its own Capital FM Manchester to the same site.

XFM Manchester's 1 kW transmitter is situated on the roof of City Tower, formerly the Sunley Building, overlooking Piccadilly Gardens in the city centre, the same place as Capital FM Manchester and 106.1 Rock Radio's transmitter. All three services share the same broadcast antenna system situated on the centre's tower which is illuminated with red Aircraft warning lights at night. XFM's analogue signal is available to an estimated 1.3 million people over the age of 15.

== XU and daytime networking ==
In May 2007, the then-owner of XFM Manchester, GCap Media, announced that all local presenters would be removed from the daytime (10 am-4 pm) lineup. Instead, an interactive show, incorporating listener requests via the website and phone in, 'vox-pops', live music and entertainment news would be broadcast. This show, named XU, was launched later that month. It received mixed reviews, and was eventually dropped a year later, replaced with networked daytime content sourced from XFM London.

== Manchester United commentary ==
In August 2007, XFM Manchester acquired the rights from 105.4 Century FM to broadcast commentary from all Manchester United games, as an adjunct to the station's usual music programming, with commentary provided by presenters including Mickey Thomas. The contract ran for one season with Key 103 becoming United's official commentary partner for 2008–11.

== Planned sale by GCap and Global takeover ==
In February 2008, GCap Media announced it would be selling the analogue licence for the station. This decision was blamed on GCap's desire to cut costs while trying to fight off a takeover bid by rival group Global Radio. Once Global's takeover of GCap succeeded, the decision to sell XFM Manchester was reversed.

== Notable presenters ==
- Clint Boon
- Jo Good
- Dave Rowntree
- Phil Clifton
- Andy Rourke
- Adam Cole
- Darryl Morris
- Guy Garvey
- Russ Winstanley
- Tony Wilson
- Mick Rock
- Lauren Laverne
- Mike Sweeney
- Jason Manford
- Paul Tonkinson
- Dave Haslam
- Mike McClean
- Pete Mitchell

== See also ==
- List of radio stations in the United Kingdom
