= Rhubarb Radio =

Rhubarb Radio may refer to:

- Rhubarb Radio (Birmingham), a radio station in the West Midlands, England
- Rhubarb Radio (Wakefield), a radio station in Yorkshire, England
