= Real Radio XS =

Coordinates: 53.4701°N 2.2877°W

England
- Broadcast area: West Central Scotland and North West England; also other areas (latterly Yorkshire) by DAB
- Frequencies: 96.3 FM (Renfrewshire); 106.1 FM (Manchester); DAB

Programming
- Format: Classic Rock

Ownership
- Owner: Communicorp

History
- First air date: 5 September 2011
- Last air date: 2016

Links
- Website: www.realradioxs.co.uk

Real Radio XS was a radio station brand operated by Real and Smooth Ltd (formerly GMG Radio) based in Salford, Greater Manchester, broadcasting a variety of peak-time news, rock music and talk output. The Manchester-based version of the service was broadcast to Greater Manchester on FM, and to a number of areas on DAB: the closure of the MXR regional multiplexes ended most digital carriage of the service, with the last remaining digital transmission, to Yorkshire, ending in 2014. The other Real Radio XS service, covering Paisley and Renfrewshire on FM and central belt Scotland digitally, became Xfm Scotland in 2014 following Global's purchase of the franchise, before closing entirely in 2015. The Manchester frequency now transmits Radio X 90s under the control of Communicorp UK, whilst the Scottish license was re-advertised by Ofcom and now carries Nation Broadcasting-owned Nation Radio Scotland.

== History ==
The station obtained a licence under the name Rock Talk despite competition from other existing stations in other categories. The station began test transmissions as 106.1 FM Rock Radio on 10 April 2008 from the top of the City Tower (the former Sunley Building) in Piccadilly in Manchester. The station promoted its launch with a free, one-day festival at Cathedral Gardens featuring the bands Bad Company, Gun, Salford Jets, Letz Zep and Mercury.

Real Radio XS's sister station, 96.3 Rock Radio based in Baillieston, Glasgow, was also named Real Radio XS by parent company Guardian Media Group in 2011. The station's parent company, Guardian Media Group, was bought by Global Radio in June 2012. On 6 February 2014, Global Radio reached an agreement to sell the station and seven others to Communicorp following recommendations from the Competition Commission.

The closure of most of the MXR regional DAB multiplexes in 2013 ended most digital carriage of Real XS, including in North West England where service reverted to being on FM only; the exception to this was in Yorkshire, where the MXR multiplex was not due to shut until 2015.

In 2014, in tandem with other changes including the replacement of Real Radio Yorkshire with Communicorp-run Heart Yorkshire, Real XS was removed from DAB in Yorkshire, reverting the station to Manchester-only FM service.

Real Radio XS was split up from 2014 following the Global/Communicorp deal. The Paisley and Renfrewshire service remained with Global and relaunched as a new Xfm Scotland, six years after the previous Xfm Scotland became Galaxy (now Capital Scotland). The 96.3 FM service was then shut off entirely in September 2015 in line with the relaunch of other Xfm services as Radio X.

The Manchester service retained the Real Radio XS name until early 2016, when it relaunched as XS Manchester. Unlike the other Communicorp stations, which share branding and network programming with Global networks under franchise, XS was a standalone service with its own branding, format and programming. XS Manchester was closed and replaced with Radio X 90s in February 2025.

== Availability ==
BAND	Frequency	AREA	Platform	NOTES
FM	106.1	Manchester	FM	Known as 106.1 Real Radio XS
DAB	12A	Yorkshire & the Humber	MXR Yorkshire	Originally replaced Rock Radio but no longer carried on DAB as from mid 2014

== Schedule ==
=== Weekdays ===
Time	Programme	Presenter(s)
01:00 – 06:00	Non Stop Rock!	Non Stop Music
06:00 – 10:00	Breakfast	Steve Berry
10:00 – 14:00	Daytime	Ricky Kirby
14:00 – 15:00	My XS	Matt White
16:00 – 19:00	Drivetime	Paul Carlin

=== Evenings ===
Time	Programme	Presenter(s)
19:00 – 23:00	Evenings	Sophie Yates
23:00 – 00:00	Non Stop Rock (Mon-Thurs)	Francis Rossi (Fri)

=== Weekends ===
Time	Programme	Presenter(s)
01:00 – 08:00	Non Stop Rock!	Non Stop Music
08:00 – 11:00	Best Of Berry	Matt White
11:00 – 14:00	Mark Matthews - XS Poll (Saturdays) Ricky Kirby - Two's Up (Sundays)	
14:00 – 18:00	Paul Carlin (Saturdays) Kay Whyld (Sundays)	
18:00 – 19:00	My XS	Matt White
19:00 – 20:00	Francis Rossi (Saturday) Chains (Sunday)	
01:00 – 08:00	Non Stop Rock!	

Themed weekends are often featured on the station and clips are voiced by presenters which include information about the featured artist.
