= Ali Brownlee =

English radio broadcaster (1959–2016)

- Born: Alastair Brownlee; 14 April 1959; Middlesbrough, England
- Died: 14 February 2016 (aged 56); Linthorpe, Middlesbrough, England
- Occupations: Radio presenter, author, publisher
- Years active: 1982–2016
- Known for: Coverage of Middlesbrough F.C. for BBC Tees and Century FM

Alastair Brownlee (14 April 1959 – 14 February 2016) was an English radio broadcaster best known for his coverage of Middlesbrough F.C. on BBC Tees from 1982 onwards. His connection to the club earned him the honorific "Voice of the Boro".

== Early life ==
Brownlee was born on Byelands Street, Middlesbrough, close to the team's Ayresome Park ground. He attended school with comedian Bob Mortimer and worked in a bank before embarking on his media career.

== Career ==
Brownlee covered over 1,000 matches for the team, and also presented BBC Tees' breakfast show. From 1995 to 2007, Brownlee and partner Bernie Slaven worked for commercial station Century FM (now Heart North East), before the rights to Middlesbrough's matches returned to the BBC.

He owned the publishing house Linthorpe Publishing, writing and printing works on Middlesbrough F.C. with his friend Gordon Cox, with titles including The Road to Eindhoven and The Class of ’86.

Brownlee was a fundraiser for charities including Sport Relief, Children in Need and the hospice Zoe's Place. He lived in Linthorpe, was married to Wendy, and had two daughters.

== Illness and death ==
Brownlee was diagnosed with bowel cancer in November 2015, informing his listeners of his condition. He continued his coverage of Boro, then pushing for a return to the Premier League, until December. In Middlesbrough's Football League Cup match against Everton at the Riverside Stadium, the fans put on a light show in solidarity with him, covered live by Sky Sports. He fought his disease for three months before his death at 56. He died at home surrounded by his family. He was survived by his wife and two daughters.

Middlesbrough F.C. chairman Steve Gibson mourned a "true friend", praising his career and charity, while former manager Tony Mowbray remembered his cheerful demeanour. Tributes also came from neighbouring clubs Hartlepool United and Sunderland alongside clubs from as far away as Everton and Stoke City.

Brownlee's funeral cortege passed the Riverside and the site of Ayresome Park before a private service at St Mary's Church in Acklam on 25 February.
