= 102.4 FM =

FM radio frequency

The following radio stations broadcast on FM frequency 102.4 MHz:

== United Kingdom ==
- Capital Mid-Counties in Burton-upon-Trent
- Downtown Radio in Derry
- Energy FM in Peel
- Greatest Hits Radio Bolton & Bury in Greater Manchester
- Greatest Hits Radio South West in West Somerset
- Greatest Hits Radio Yorkshire Coast in Bridlington
- Heart East in Great Yarmouth and Norwich
- Heart South in Heathfield, East Sussex
- Heart West in Cheltenham and Gloucester
- Nevis Radio in Loch Leven
- Radio Hartlepool in Hartlepool
- Redroad FM in Rotherham
