= Real Radio =

- United Kingdom
- Broadcast area: North East England, North West England (exc. Cumbria), Scotland, Wales, Yorkshire

Programming
- Language: English
- Format: Adult Contemporary

Ownership
- Owner: Communicorp/Global Radio

History
- First air date: 3 October 2000
- Last air date: 6 May 2014 (Merged with Heart)
- Former frequencies: 88–108FM

Links
- Website: Heart

Real Radio was a network of five regional radio stations broadcasting to North East England, North West England, Scotland, Wales and Yorkshire. Each station broadcasts a mix of local and networked programming. On Tuesday 6 May 2014, the stations were merged with the Heart network.

== History ==
Real Radio logo, 2001–2012

Sir Robert Phillis, the former GMG chief executive, enlisted John Myers to establish GMG Radio. Myers became the company's managing director in 1999, and won GMG its first licence in South Wales in April 2000. Real Radio (Wales) launched on Tuesday 3 October 2000. Initially serving south and west Wales, the station expanded to north and mid Wales in January 2011, over two years after winning a second licence.

In June 2001, Scot FM was acquired from the Wireless Group for £25.5 million. Scot FM would become Real Radio's second station at 8 am on Tuesday 8 January 2002. A bid to expand the service to Aberdeenshire in 2006 proved unsuccessful, losing out to Original 106.

Real Yorkshire, the third station, launched on 25 March 2002 and broadcast to South & West Yorkshire.

In 2008, John Myers convinced the GMG board to invest £1 million in documentaries, a first for modern-day UK commercial radio which would lead to several industry awards. Myers left GMG shortly afterwards.

Real North East and Real North West were introduced from the Century Network on 30 March 2009. Both stations were founded by GMG Radio chief executive John Myers, who acquired the two from GCap Media in October 2006. The Discover the Real You strapline was introduced to all stations.

In July 2008, networked programming was introduced across all stations during evening and overnight timeslots, and in November 2012 this was increased to daytime timeslots. Most networked programming was broadcast from studios in Salford Quays. Notable presenters included Chris Tarrant and Ryan Seacrest who fronted a bespoke version of his syndicated US entertainment show On Air with Ryan Seacrest. Gary Davies also had a stint between 2001 and 2008, hosting a weekly CD chart.

A new strapline Real good, feel good radio, was introduced in March 2012.

In August 2012, the two former Century Network stations, in the North East and the North West, were gaining just half the listeners they once had. Both saw a decline in Listening Share In TSA % when comparing Q2 period in 2011 and 2012, from 6.30% to 4.8%, and 3.9% to 3.0% respectively. Figures for Scotland also lowered whilst Wales and Yorkshire steadied.

== Closure and merger with Heart ==
Heart logo, 2014 onwards

On 25 June 2012, Global Radio (the owner of stations such as Capital and Heart) announced it had bought GMG Radio, however the GMG radio stations would continue to operate separately until a regulatory review into the sale took place.

Secretary of State Maria Miller announced in October 2012 that the sale would not be investigated on the grounds of plurality. The Competition Commission was due to publish its final report on 27 March 2013, but delays over the decision left the former GMG stations in a hold separate situation. A holding company called Real and Smooth Limited was formed.

On 21 May 2013, the Competition Commission ruled Global would have to sell radio stations in seven areas of the UK - including all areas served by a Real Radio station. A subsequent appeal by Global was rejected at a tribunal.

On 6 February 2014, Global Radio announced it would be rebranding all Real Radio stations as Heart and be selling Real Radio Yorkshire and the Northern licence of Real Radio Wales to Communicorp. Heart's network programming and brand name will be used under a franchise agreement.

On 25 March 2014, the stations began a transition period to the Heart branding. The Real Radio branding was phased out on Sunday 20 April 2014 - for the time being, all stations are referred to on air as The Heart of (TSA).

The full launch of the new Heart stations took place at 6 am on Tuesday 6 May 2014. All local programming is retained with networked output on all stations carried from Global's Leicester Square studios in London, replacing the once networked output from Real Radio's Laser House studios in Salford Quays. Real Radio Wales has now been split into two separate stations following the changes, by providing localised programming from Cardiff and Wrexham respectively.

== List of former Real Radio stations ==
- Heart North East
- Heart North and Mid Wales
- Heart North West
- Heart South Wales
- Heart Yorkshire
