= Uncle Rotter =

British singer-songwriter

- Uncle Rotter, taken at Bloodstock Open Air 2009

Background information
- Origin: Manchester, UK
- Genres: Thuggish Cartoon Disco Metal; Gothic Glam
- Years active: 2007-present
- Labels: unsigned
- Members: Uncle Rotter; Twiggy Bang Bang; General Slave; Venom Rotter; Dr T (M.D); Ramirez Rotter

Uncle Rotter is a UK singer/songwriter who gave his name to the six-piece rock band he formed in Manchester, England, in 2007 in response to wide demand for his product on Myspace.

Uncle Rotter's music is best described as "thuggish cartoon disco metal" and infamously features very catchy songs with lyrics that would upset listeners with a sensitive disposition as demonstrated on the release of his seminal hit "Fit Goth Chicks (on the end of my dick)", which won 106.1 Manchester Rock Radio's Future Classics, with 85% of the vote.

Samples from porn and horror movies feature a large part of Uncle Rotter's sound, as does an influence of rock, metal, old school punk, Oi! punk, 70's disco and 70's glam.

All lyrics and music are written by the band's founder and vocalist, the eponymously titled Uncle Rotter.
Only five Uncle Rotter recordings are available on the internet - Fit Goth Chicks, The Eyes Of PJ Soles, King Of The World, Lesbian Vampire Killers and Zombies Wild. All the instruments featured on the tracks were played by Uncle Rotter himself.

The live band have toured the UK extensively since 2008, have appeared on BBC2's "Scene Stealers" and were name-checked by Matthew Wright on his Channel 5 TV show "The Wright Stuff", Matthew being a big fan of the band since he saw them at Hawkfest and on tour with Hawkwind in 2008.

Uncle Rotter recorded and produced a song for the British comedy horror film, Lesbian Vampire Killers and the band appeared at the movie premiere in Leicester Square, London, at the request of the film's writer Paul Hupfield in March 2009. The single went on to win the Scottish Rock Radio Future Classics with 87% of the vote.

The band were spotted by legendary Rock DJ Steve 'Krusher' Joule when they shared the stage with him at a gig in Shepherd's Bush, London, in March 2008. Krusher was so impressed he asked Uncle Rotter to headline his birthday party at London's Embassy Club in April 2009.

Later that month, Uncle Rotter hosted the sell-out Uncle Rotter's St George's Eve Bash at Manchester Academy 3.
Krusher teamed up with the band again that year by personally introducing Uncle Rotter's set when they opened the main stage at Bloodstock Open Air 2009 after winning Bloodstock Unsigned.

In October 2010, Uncle Rotter released a single, "Zombies Wild", on behalf of Zombie-Aid, a horror-themed charity fundraising organization. A video was made to accompany the tune and Slipknot's Corey Taylor recorded a video urging fans to buy the single, this was accompanied by one month's solid airplay on Manchester Rock Radio (unheard of for an unsigned act) and a UK tour including shows at both Manchester and London Hard Rock Cafes (with Krusher Joule as guest DJ at the London gig).

Uncle Rotter played the final gig with his mark one line up on Saturday 23 July 2011 at the Sanctuary Rock Club, Burnley, Lancashire, England, though the band minus Uncle Rotter himself, still play the occasional gig as 'The Rotter Band'.

== Members ==
2007–2011

- Uncle Rotter - Vocals, songwriter and samples
- Twiggy Bang Bang - Lead guitar
- General Slave - Lead guitar
- Venom Rotter - Rhythm guitar
- Dr T (M.D) - Bass guitar
- Ramirez Rotter - Drums

== Discography ==
- Lesbian Vampires EP feat.Fit Goth Chicks, The Eyes Of PJ Soles, King Of The World (2007)
- Lesbian Vampire Killers (2009)
- Zombies Wild (2010)
