= Streetsounds =

Streetsounds may refer to:

- Streetsounds (radio show), a defunct radio show on Radio Clyde
- StreetSounds (record label), a 1980s UK record label specialising in dance music
