= Brian Ford (British radio broadcaster) =

Brian Ford is a British radio broadcaster.

== Early life and career ==
Brian studied at Leith Academy before going on to work as a journalist with the Daily Mail then starting his broadcasting career as one of the original DJs on Radio Clyde from its beginning in December 1973 until October 1990, where he presented many slots including his stint as the host of the punk rock/new wave radio show Streetsounds in the 1970s. Brian also worked for other radio stations such as Radio Forth (1979 - 1982), Radio City (1982 - 1984) and BBC Radio Scotland (1984 - 1988) throughout this time..

Between 1983 and 2006 Brian was a continuity announcer, newsreader and voiceover artist for Scottish Television whilst continuing working in radio presenting with Scot FM and Q96 throughout the mid-late 1990s, Brian returned to Radio Clyde in December 2000, by hosting 1152 Clyde 2's weekend breakfast show and provided relief cover for other presenters upon their absences, Brian left Clyde 2 and STV in January 2007 and moved onto work as a BBC Scotland continuity announcer on BBC One Scotland, BBC Two Scotland and BBC Radio Scotland until leaving the corporation in 2012, He since returned to Clyde 2 providing relief cover for other presenters in 2012 and 2017 whilst now working as a freelance announcer these days.
