= John Simons =

British radio executive

- Born: 4 March 1956 (age 70); Evenwood, County Durham, England
- Occupation: Radio executive
- Employer: John Simons Consulting

John Simons (John Potts) is a British radio executive, former group programming director for GMG Radio now working as an International Radio Consultant, mainly in Europe, Africa and the Middle East.

== Biography ==
Simons began his career in 1979, before fronting the Breakfast Show on Radio Tees from 1983 to 1986 (where he was also head of music), and moving to BBC Radio Nottingham where he presented the mid-morning show and afternoon drive show from 1987 to 1994.

In 1994 he was invited to be part of the team who launched Century Radio in Gateshead as programme director, assisting the managing director John Myers. The Century brand with a high speech content ratio became successful, with other stations subsequently launched in Nottingham and Salford. At the North East Century he hosted the Afternoon show as well as the Lunch Time Phone-In and the Sunday lunchtime light-entertainment show called The Crazy Gardening Show with gardening experts Adam (Malcolm) Edon and Gary Philipson.

In 1997 he became programme director of national speech station Talk Radio UK, which was then attracting 2.1 million listeners, and saw an increase to 2.8 million listeners under his tenure. He left when Kelvin MacKenzie took over the station after CLT sold to the Mirror Group in November 1998, and was escorted from the building by security officers on the takeover. He then moved onto London's LBC programming an all talk and phone-in format with which he had become so familiar. He then returned to mainly music radio on BBC Radio 2 where he was drafted in to work on music policy by the Controller Jim Moir and his Deputy Lesley Douglas.

In 2000 he was then invited to become the group programme director for GMG Radio, by the then chief executive, his former Century boss and colleague from Radio Tees days John Myers.

GMG first launched, Real Radio in South Wales, the most successful of regional radio station launches and its Scottish equivalent formerly Scot FM bought for around £25 Million became yet again the most listened to radio station in Scotland in just two years. The Group grew quickly launching Real Radio Yorkshire followed by the acquisition of Jazz FM in London and the North West and then Saga Radio in the East & West Midlands, Glasgow and the North East. This made GMG Radio the third biggest commercial radio group in the UK.

In May 2004 Simons was awarded the Sony Radio Academy Gold Award for Programmer of the Year. In October 2006, the group acquired the Century brand from GCap Media, and in December 2006 Simons received a Fellowship from The Radio Academy, "an award to recognise individuals who have made outstanding contributions to the industry."

On 25 June 2012 it was announced Global Radio (the owner of stations such as Capital and Heart) had bought GMG Radio, however the former will continue to operate separately until a regulatory review is carried out, Real Radio is thought to integrate into Heart.

John left Real and Smooth Radio at the end of 2013 having left the stations on record Rajar results and re-entered the world of consultancy.
