= Lisa Shaw =

Lisa Shaw can refer to:

- Lisa Shaw (musician), a Canadian musician
- Lisa Shaw (broadcaster) (1976–2021), a BBC radio personality
- Lisa Fowler, a fictional character from the series EastEnders also known as Lisa Shaw
