= Spectrum FM =

- Spain
- Frequencies: 97.6FM and 96.0FM on the Costa del Sol; 92.6FM in Mojacar; 106.7FM in Costa Calida/Blanca

Programming
- Format: Music radio

History
- First air date: 1997

Links
- Website: http://www.spectrumfm.net

Spectrum FM is an English language radio station in parts of southern Spain. It broadcasts to the Costa del Sol, Costa Blanca, Costa Almeria, Costa Calida, Costa Blanca, Tenerife, Mallorca, Canary Islands and the cities of Benidorm, Marbella, Murcia, Málaga, Algeciras and Alicante.

== Programmes ==
A mix of 1980s, 1990s and current chart music for an English-speaking audience. Over the years, presenters have included Mark Goodier, Ed Stewart, Dave Lee Travis, John Morgan, Graham Torrington and Mark Dennison. Spectrum FM offers local, national and international news and cultural information to help foreign residents and visitors to integrate more easily into Spanish life.
