= Debbie Lindley =

British television presenter

Debbie Lindley (born 4 June 1973 in Mirfield, West Yorkshire) is an English former television presenter and journalist.

In 1995, Lindley began her career co-presenting weekday breakfast on The Pulse of West Yorkshire, until joining ITV Yorkshire a year later as a weather presenter.

In 2002, Lindley joined Real Radio Yorkshire presenting a late night weekend request show.

In January 2003 she moved to co-present the flagship breakfast show 6-10am, five days a week, alongside Terry Underhill. She returned in 2006 to co-present with Guy Harris and briefly with Darren Kelly, until May 2007. From July 2007 she presented a Saturday morning show, from 10:00–14:00, with a Sunday afternoon show from 13:00–16:00 for a time.

In January 2009 she left ITV Yorkshire (where she also appeared on ITV Border, ITV Granada and ITV Tyne Tees).

In June 2012 she rejoined The Pulse of West Yorkshire co-presenting weekday breakfast, this time alongside Paul Foster until 2014.
