= Rock Radio =

- United Kingdom
- Broadcast area: United Kingdom

Programming
- Format: Classic rock

Ownership
- Owner: GMG Radio

History
- First air date: 8 January 2007
- Last air date: October 2011
- Former frequencies: FM: 96.3 MHz (Central Scotland); 106.1 MHz (Manchester); DAB

Rock Radio was a brand of radio stations in the United Kingdom owned by GMG Radio.

96.3 Rock Radio was the first station in the network. It operated in West Central Scotland. The station was launched on the frequency which was formerly used by Paisley local radio station Q96.

A digital station named Rock Radio was launched on DAB on 1 April 2008 in the North East of England, and extended to Yorkshire and the Severn Estuary from 2010. It was initially a presenter-led station, then switched to automated rock service similar to The Arrow, but later changed to simulcast programmes from the Manchester station.

106.1 Rock Radio launched in Manchester in May 2008. The station was a new city licence awarded to GMG under the name Rock Talk, which originally proposed to broadcast talk programming in peak hours and rock music in the off-peak. The station is currently available on FM in Manchester but is not currently on DAB in its target area.

Since September 2009, automated evening content on 96.3 Rock Radio had been replaced by presented programmes from 106.1 Rock Radio.

In September 2011 106.1 Rock Radio was renamed 106.1 Real Radio XS.

== See also ==
- Real Radio XS
