= Heart North East =

- Newcastle upon Tyne; England
- Broadcast area: North East England and parts of North Yorkshire
- Frequency: DAB: 11B Bauer Teesside 11C Bauer Tyne and Wear; FM: 96.2 MHz Fenham; 96.4 MHz Hexham; 100.7 MHz North Yorkshire; 101.2 MHz Sunderland; 101.8 MHz South Shields
- Branding: This is Heart

Programming
- Format: Hot Adult Contemporary
- Network: Century Network (1994–2009); Real Radio Network (2009–2014); Heart Network (2014–present)

Ownership
- Owner: Global
- Sister stations: Capital North East; Smooth North East

History
- First air date: 1 September 1994 (as Century); 30 March 2009 (as Real Radio); 6 May 2014 (as Heart)

Links
- Webcast: Global Player
- Website: www.heart.co.uk/northeast/

Heart North East is a regional radio station owned and operated by Global as part of the Heart network. It broadcasts to North East England.

== History ==
=== Century Radio ===
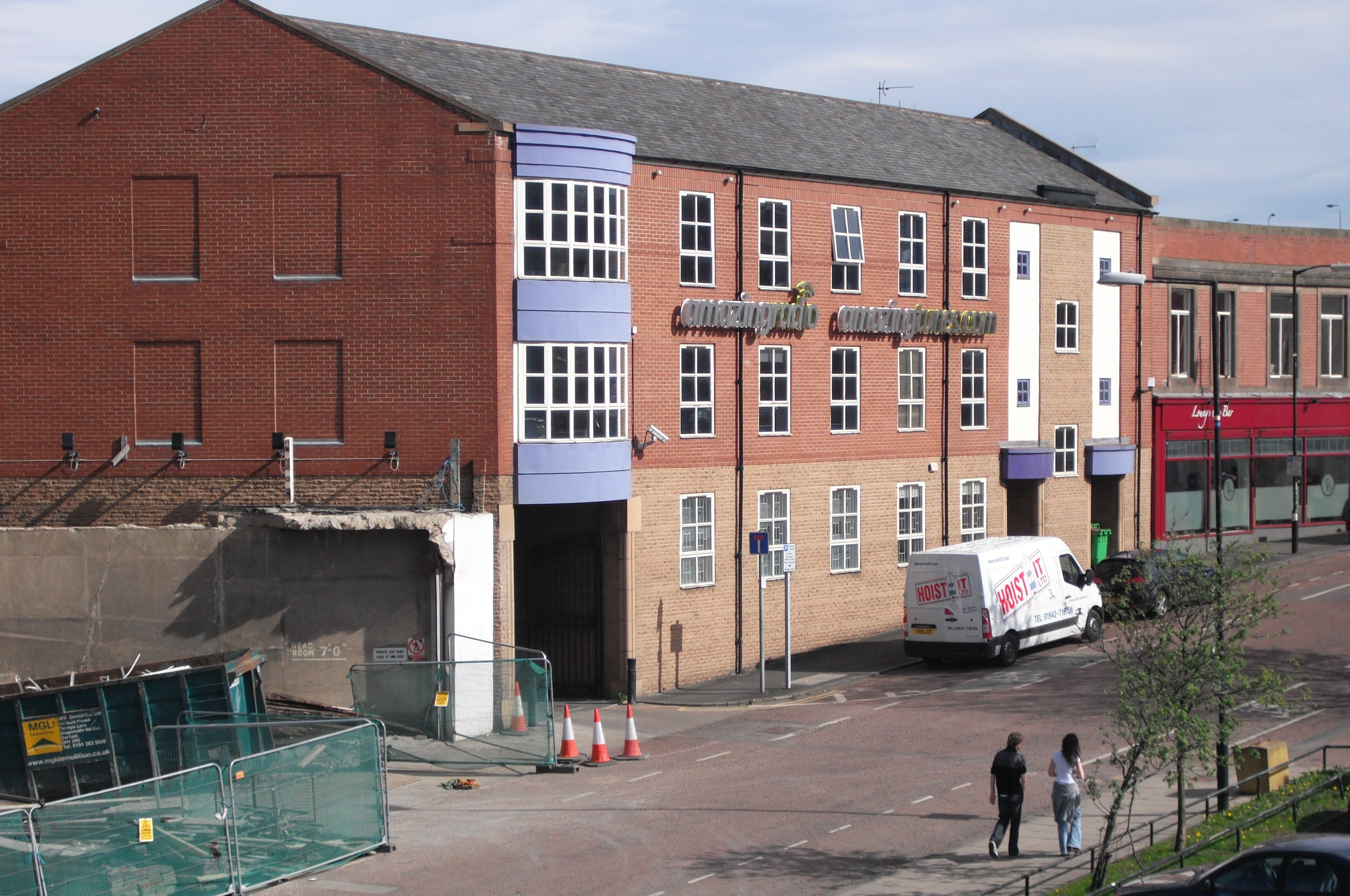
Century was based in a building next to the Tyne Bridge Tower for most of its life

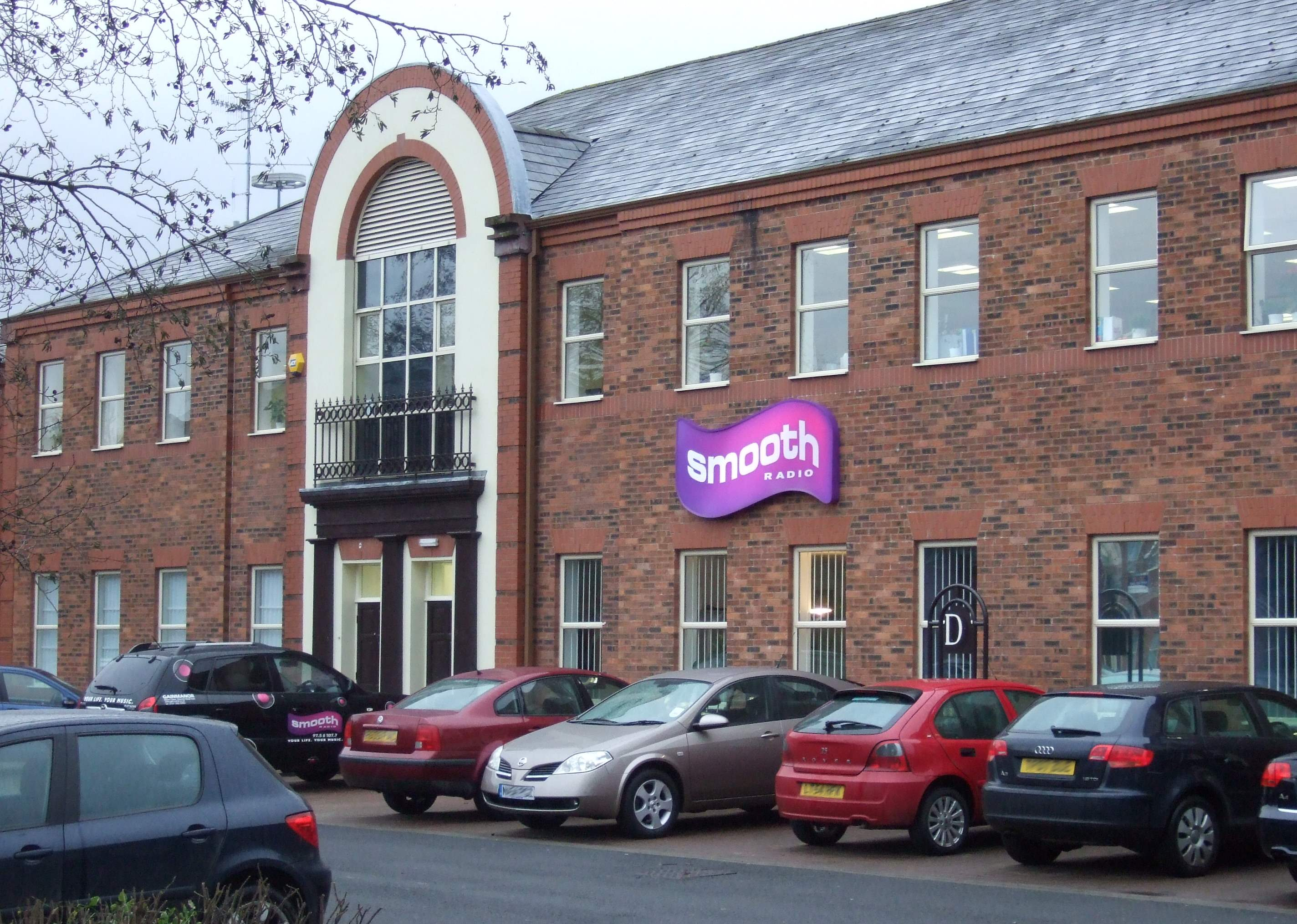
The former studios at Team Valley, Gateshead

Century Radio was the first regional station for North East England and also was the first to use the Century brand, which followed a 'personality' format, mixing speech and music. The station was originally based beside the Tyne Bridge in Gateshead, before relocating to Team Valley in 2008 to share a building with fellow GMG Radio stations, Smooth Radio and Rock Radio. The station was originally called Century Radio, before changing its name to Century FM then reverting to the original name in 2008.

The station was set up by Border Television, with John Myers as managing director and John Simons as programme director. Myers presented the breakfast show under the pseudonym of John Morgan. The first song played on air was "A Star is Born".

A 'listener's club' was formed, with parties at locations around the region attended by the station's presenters. The Jingling Gate in Stanley, County Durham was the most common location, but other events were held at the Stadium of Light and the Dolphin Centre in Darlington.

Late-night phone-in presenter Mike 'The Mouth' Elliott once caused controversy by walking out during his show. Elliot took an extended break after this controversy, during which time he appeared in the film Billy Elliot as boxing coach George Watson. He was also fired in January 2000 when bosses claimed that he was intoxicated on air. However, Elliott claims that he was "stoned out of his tree" on Benylin while trying to fight off a heavy cold. He was reemployed when Capital Radio took over the station.

Ex-Metro Radio presenter Steve Colman's highly marketed introduction to the breakfast show was very unpopular, and he was sacked after just three weeks in August 1996. It was revealed that audiences had decreased rapidly, and businesses had threatened to pull their advertising. Colman later joined Smooth North East.

Jeff Stephenson replaced Myers as managing director, and John Caine replaced Simons. Simons left the station for Talksport, and Myers left Gateshead to concentrate on setting up 105.4 Century FM in Salford and relaunching 106 Century FM in Nottingham.

Border sold the Century brand to GCap Media, and Myers left the group to head GMG Radio, where he set up the similar Real Radio network. Simons rejoined Myers to establish the Real and Smooth FM regional stations. In October 2006 GMG Radio acquired the Century brand from GCap.Wayback Machine Paul Smith, a former BBC and commercial radio producer, then joined Century as Programme Controller, and Sales Director Debbie Bowman was promoted to managing director. Smith left the company after the current Programme Director Kevin Howard joined the company in September 2007.

=== Real Radio ===
On 18 December 2008 it was announced that Century Radio would be re-branded as Real Radio from 30 March 2009.

The station has previously broadcast extensively on football, a passion in the north east, and had a particularly close relationship with both Newcastle United and Middlesbrough. The station began its association with the game with the 1994 launch of 'The Big Mal Football Phone-In' hosted by Teesside presenter Dave Roberts and ex-manager Malcolm Allison. The station then signed an exclusive radio rights deal with Middlesbrough FC with Roberts and Allison joined by local BBC broadcaster Ali Brownlee and the resultant 'Roberts & Brownlee Show' was born.

Two famous ex-players for local sides, Malcolm Macdonald, who played for Newcastle United and Bernie Slaven, who played for Middlesbrough, presented the Legends Football Phone-In on weekday evenings, alongside ex-Sunderland player Eric Gates, and latterly, FA Cup Final 1973 winner Micky Horswill. Live match commentaries on Newcastle United and Sunderland matches aired until the end of the 2010–11 season. The Legends Football Phone In was dropped following the end of the 2011–12 season. The phone-in later moved to Star Radio North East and several community radio stations but was axed within a year.

=== Heart ===
On 25 June 2012, it was announced Global (the owner of stations such as Capital and Heart) had bought GMG Radio. The former GMG stations, including Real Radio, were placed under a hold separate company known as Real and Smooth Limited.

As of 5 November 2012, the station's local programming consisted of a daily breakfast and weekday drivetime shows from Newcastle upon Tyne with most non-peak output broadcast from Salford Quays.

On 6 February 2014, Global announced it would be rebranding all Real Radio stations as Heart. Real Radio North East began a gradual transition to the Heart branding on 24 March 2014. The Real Radio branding was phased out a month later ahead of a full relaunch as Heart North East on 6 May 2014. Around the time of the rebrand, the station's audience share was 3.8% (as of June 2014).

Gary Philipson and Lisa Shaw presented their final breakfast show in December 2014 after almost five years at the station. Justin Lockwood and Kelly Scott were promoted from the drivetime show and replaced the duo. Heart Gloucestershire presenter Tom Campbell joined inturn to takeover from Lockwood and Scott.

In May 2015, Heart North East moved to new studios at new studios at Wellbar Central in Newcastle city centre, shared with sister station Capital North East and Communicorp-owned Smooth North East.

In February 2019, following OFCOM's decision to relax local content obligations from commercial radio, Global announced it would replace Heart North East's local breakfast and weekend shows with networked programming from London.

Breakfast presenters Justin Lockwood and Kelly Scott, alongside drivetime presenter Tom Campbell left the station in May 2019, with the latter joining wrestling-centric YouTube channel Cultaholic.

From 3 June 2019, the station's regional output consisted of a three-hour Drivetime show on weekdays, alongside regional news bulletins, traffic updates and advertising.

As of 24 February 2025 all programming originates from Global's London headquarters, including Heart Drive, presented each weekday by JK and Kelly Brook.

== News ==
Journalists within North East England produce hourly regional news bulletins from 6 a.m. to 6 p.m. on weekdays and from 6 a.m. to midday at weekends with headlines on the half-hour during weekday breakfast.

== Notable former presenters ==
- Ali Brownlee (deceased)
- Wes Butters (now at Hits Radio)
- Rich Clarke (now at Heart South)
- Eric Gates
- Micky Horswill
- Roger Kennedy
- Malcolm Macdonald
- Bobby Moncur
- Jonathan Morrell
- Vicky Pattison
- Dave Roberts
- Gary Rowell
- Ryan Seacrest (continues at On Air With Ryan Seacrest)
- Lisa Shaw (deceased)
- Bernie Slaven
- Kate Thornton (now at Greatest Hits Radio)
