= Focal Radio =

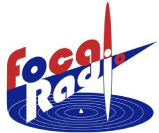

England
- Frequency: DAB

Programming
- Format: General interest

Ownership
- Owner: Focal Radio Ltd.

History
- First air date: 5 November 2008

Focal Radio was a commercial radio station based in the city of Stoke-on-Trent and broadcasting to the two counties of Staffordshire and Cheshire in England.

The station broadcasts 24 hours a day, seven days a week via the local DAB multiplex for the city as well as online.

The station's entirely locally produced programming consisted of popular music from the past 40 years along with news, sport and speech features of general interest to the local population. A number of specialist music programmes were also provided.

In February 2009, the station closed down having run out of cash after just four months on air and its parent company Trent Radio Station Limited was placed into liquidation. Several weeks later, the station resumed broadcasting having been acquired by local businessman Mo Chaudry.

Chaudry pulled out of backing the station three months later, resulting in an on-air pledge drive asking for listeners to buy a £10 stake in the station. Despite raising over £60,000 in a week, staff and management failed to raise another £20,000 in order to pay back the investment made by Chaudry. Focal Radio ceased transmission again at 1pm on Thursday 28 May 2009.
