= Rhubarb Radio (Wakefield) =

Heart London
- England
- Branding: Rhubarb Radio

Programming
- Format: Hot Adult Contemporary

History
- First air date: 1 August 2017; 8 years ago

Links
- Website: www.rhubarbradio.co.uk

Rhubarb Radio is a local commercial radio station based in Wakefield city centre, it serves the whole of the Wakefield district including the 5 Towns, Dewsbury & Batley. It is operated by volunteers who bring a wealth of experience to the station. Rhubarb Radio launched as a commercial local radio service in Wakefield on 1 October 2017 at midday. It plays a variety of hits from the 1970s to today. The radio station can be heard on tuneIn Radio, Radio-live-uk.com, on smartphones and tablets by downloading the free app and on Smartspeakers. Also soon to be launched on DAB across the Wakefield district, Dewsbury & Batley around late 2023.

In early 2021, a second station under the Rhubarb Radio brand was launched - Rhubarb Smoothies Radio, this station plays a wide selection of mellow music

== Rhubarb Smoothies Radio ==
Rhubarb Smoothies is the first of the planned spin-off stations from Rhubarb Radio and was launched in 2021 as a lifestyle station with an easy listening music policy.

== See also ==
- Rhubarb Radio (Birmingham)
