= Street Sounds (radio show) =

Street Sounds was a radio show on Radio Clyde hosted by Brian Ford and specialising in punk rock, new wave and ska music. It aired on Wednesday evenings and ran from October 1977 to August 1981.

A (heavily edited) interview with the Sex Pistols aired in November 1977.
