= Manchester United Radio =

- Manchester; England
- Frequency: 1413 AM

Programming
- Format: Sports radio and commentary

Ownership
- Owner: Manchester United F.C.

History
- First air date: March 1994
- Last air date: 3 May 2008

Manchester United Radio was a low power amplitude modulation (LPAM) community radio station owned by Manchester United F.C. which broadcast live match commentary, interviews, features and news relevant to travelling supporters within an area of approximately 50 miles around Old Trafford on matchdays between March 1994 and May 2008.

== Launch ==
Manchester United launched the station in March 1994. Former Piccadilly Radio presenter Matt Proctor was the creator and presenter of the Match Day show and the station's output would often be simulcast on the PA system inside Old Trafford during the early part of the afternoon or evening.

== Broadcasting hours ==
The station was a low-power AM station only available when Manchester United played a home game at Old Trafford, generally broadcasting from around three hours before kick-off until around two hours after the final whistle. As an LPAM station broadcasting with a restricted service licence, it could only be received within a limited distance from the stadium – approximately a 50-mile radius.

== End of station ==
After 418 games, Manchester United quietly retired the station after the 2007-08 season when they announced that they had agreed a deal with local radio station Key 103.

== Notable presenters ==
- Matt Proctor, host
- David Hooton, match commentator
- Wilf McGuinness, match summariser
- David Meek, analyst
- Rachel Jervis, statistician
- Tom Tyrrell, traffic reports and analyst
