= Scot FM =

- Leith, Edinburgh; Scotland
- Broadcast area: Central and Southern Scotland
- Frequencies: 100.3 MHz (Glasgow); 101.1 MHz (Edinburgh)

Ownership
- Owner: Grampian Television (1994-96); Border Television (1994-95); Independent Radio Group (1996-99); The Wireless Group (1999–2001)

History
- First air date: 16 September 1994 - 7 January 2002

Scot FM was a regional radio station serving Central and Southern Scotland. Broadcast from studios at Albert Quay in Leith, the station was billed as radio for Scotland's thinking classes but was unable to create a clear identity for itself, while changing its format to focus on more populist content, including less speech and more music. The station was relaunched as Real Radio Scotland in January 2002 following a buyout by GMG Radio. Real Radio has since been succeeded by Heart Scotland.

== History ==
=== Origins ===
In early 1993, the Radio Authority invited applicants to bid for a new regional FM licence covering Central Scotland and serving a potential audience of 3.3 million listeners. Seven groups contested the franchise:

- Central Scotland Radio, a speech-based station backed by Border and Grampian television companies
- Radio Six, led by Tony Currie with a 24-hour news and speech station
- Central Scotland Broadcasting Ltd with an easy listening and information service
- A company proposing a Celtic/rock format
- A company proposing a contemporary rock format
- A company proposing a country music format
- A company proposing Christian-based programming format

Central Scotland Radio was named as the preferred bidder on 10 December 1993. The Radio Authority argued that the station would extend listeners choice and could demonstrate financial stability and professional qualifications appropriate to launching and maintaining the service during its eight-year licence period. The company's founding chairman, Sir David Steel (a non-executive director of Border Television), pledged the majority of its programming would be a unique Scottish view of Britain, the world, and Central Scotland's place in it. We will be primarily a talk station with news, travel information, and weather reports. Sport, politics, and the arts will be covered and listeners will be heavily involved through regular phone-ins. There was some disagreement and even questioning of the decision to let two television companies already running regional ITV franchises operate the new licence.

=== 1994 - 1996 ===
Scot FM began broadcasting on Friday 16 September 1994, after two weeks of test transmissions. Problems arose even before the station went on air - none of the thirteen presenters listed in its original application schedule had remained with the company and its target of 50% quality speech output at peak times could not be achieved. The station's news service was contracted out to Reuters Radio, leading to some confusion over how a station promising a unique Scottish view of Britain was carrying most of its news bulletins from an agency producing syndicated bulletins in London.

Complaints about the station began to appear in the press. Meanwhile, Scot FM management went back to the Radio Authority four times to seek permission to reduce its speech obligations within the licensed format. The station itself had limited music resources with around 1000 tracks on its playout systems, leading to some members of staff reportedly visiting local music shops to buy CDs of artists who were appearing as guests on the station. The first official RAJAR figures released in early 1995 revealed that the station had a weekly audience of 8%, far short of the target 13% share, making it one of the least successful UK radio stations in terms of audience share. Within seven months of the station going on air, five different presenters had hosted Scot FM's breakfast show and a programme controller had left owing to ill health.

A major revamp of the station took place shortly afterwards with the entire presenting team being replaced by new signings including Alison Craig, Robin Galloway and Scottie McClue. Despite the new presenting line-up and a reported improvement in weekly listening figures to 350,000, complaints regarding format and regulatory problems led to another shake-up at management level. The station replaced its syndicated Reuters Radio news bulletins with an in-house service, although this had limited resources and was reportedly under-staffed with inexperienced young journalists who were even forced to travel by bus to help cut costs. In May 1995, Border Television pulled out of the company and sold its stake to Grampian, which became the sole owner of Scot FM.

In another attempt to improve its fortunes, Scot FM brought exclusive rights to carry live Scottish Football League match commentaries for £155,000 a year. This caused even further problems when Northsound (official broadcast partner with Aberdeen F.C.) complained as Scot FM did not cover the Aberdeen area.

After two years in the role, Scot FM's managing director Tom Hunter resigned, another programme controller became ill with stress, and most of the presenting line-up departed. In 1996, Scot FM reported losses of around £1 million.

=== 1996 - 2000 ===
In July 1996, Grampian sold Scot FM to the Independent Radio Group for £5.25 million,

The new owners aimed to make Scot FM profitable by 1998 and boost listening figures further by using the regional franchise to its advantage. Two months after the sale, Norman Quirk became Scot FM's managing director with Jeff Graham as programme controller.

The station lost two of its presenters in 1997 - Scottie McClue left in January when contract negotiations broke down while Robin Galloway quit in March after a fallout with Jeff Graham. Both departures and those of several staff, who disagreed with Graham over a schedule revamp, led to a drop in listening figures, with half of its audience share disappearing - Scot FM had been reaching 16% of the population in the east and 14% in the west. IRG Chief Executive Michael Connolly claimed the station's new schedule was starting to regain lost listeners, while speaking of a three-year plan to turn its fortunes around.

By the end of 1997, Jeff Graham was replaced by John Collins, prompting another programming revamp and the arrival of more new presenters, including Gary Marshall (breakfast), Dougie Jackson (mid-mornings) and Donny Hughes (drivetime). A revamp of news operations saw Glenn Campbell become Scot FM's Head of News, presenting a daily 90-minute news magazine programme Lunchtime Live, which went on to win a silver Sony award in 1999 and a nomination at the New York Radio Awards. Robin Galloway also returned to Scot FM in March 1999, presenting a Sunday lunchtime show from his home studio in Manchester.

Scot FM's owners IRG were brought by the Wireless Group in October 1999 for £21 million. By this time, the station was still loss making, prompting the company to sell off Scot FM. After rejecting bids from Chrysalis and Scottish Radio Holdings (SRH offered £29m but rejected due to competition commission issues), the Guardian Media Group brought the station for £25.5 million in June 2001 - a sale which, at 13 times the annual revenue of Scot FM, allowed the station to clear its debts quickly.

Analysts were surprised that TWG sold Scot FM, widely regarded as one of its best assets, rather than disposing of some of its 18 smaller stations.

John Myers, chief executive of GMG Radio said: The problem with Scot FM is that it has changed owners faster than I've changed coats. It was badly launched. They gave an impression that they were going to do Radio 4 type speech and then they went and hired Scottie McClue. For the first time, Scot FM will have an owner that might actually give Scottish Radio Holdings a run for their money.

Following the acquisition, GMG Radio relaunched and rebranded the station as Real Radio Scotland at 8am on Tuesday 8 January 2002. The station was latterly sold onto Global Radio in 2014, prompting a further relaunch as Heart Scotland in May 2014.

== Advertising ==
Scot FM broadcast separate commercial breaks on both its Glasgow and Edinburgh frequencies (100.3 FM in the West and 101.1 FM in the East).

== Presenters ==
=== Original line up ===
(from September 1994 - January 1995)

- Iain Hossack (New and Alternative music) Fridays 7-10pm
- Iain Agnew
- Bruce Findlay
- Brian Ford
- Haig Gordon (Weekends 10pm - 1am)
- Kenny Hutchinson
- Simon Lumsden
- Chris Mann
- Gerry Burke
- Ken Mitchell
- Paul Martin Davis
- Margo McDonald

=== Other presenters ===
- Big Al
- Glenn Campbell
- Mhairi-Ann Corrigall
- Jay Crawford
- Jenny Farrish
- Cameron McKenna
- Robin Galloway
- Neil Henderson
- Alex Horsburgh
- Donny Hughes
- Steve Jack
- Dougie Jackson
- Dave Johanssen
- Joe Kilday
- Mike Riddoch
- Gary Marshall
- Mark McKenzie
- Scottie McClue
- Craig McMurdo
- Thea Newcomb
- Frank Pilkington
- Kenny Stevens
- Schweppes & Transition
- Rod Johnston
- Arlene Stuart
- 'Wee Fat Boab'
- Bill Young
- Dave Richards
- Terry McGeadie
