= Radio Hartlepool =

- Hartlepool; England
- Broadcast area: Hartlepool
- Frequency: 102.4 FM

Programming
- Language: English
- Format: Community radio

Ownership
- Owner: Hartlepool Community Broadcasting Limited

History
- First air date: 14 October 2008

Links
- Website: www.radiohartlepool.co.uk

Radio Hartlepool is a full-time community radio station that broadcasts to the various communities in Hartlepool, County Durham, England on 102.4 FM and streaming online at radiohartlepool.co.uk. The station went on air full-time on 14 October 2008. Radio Hartlepool is the broadcast call sign of Hartlepool Community Broadcasting Limited, a not for profit organisation, social enterprise limited by guarantee and registered at Companies House No: 05316109. It was set up to bring Community Radio to Hartlepool with charitable aims and objectives that have an adopted constitution.

Radio Hartlepool is broadcasting free via Hospedia channel 1 into the university hospital of Hartlepool and on FM 102.4 MHz. They also have a website to provide details of the community radio station, its presenters, local news and features.

== History ==
For more than ten years, Radio Hartlepool's managing director and project coordinator Jason Anderson has worked towards the goal of establishing a local radio station for Hartlepool. Since 1995 Jason has worked and studied local radio, visiting and meeting Radio Management teams from all around the country, attending broadcast and media fairs both nationally and internationally, in an effort to bring Local Radio to Hartlepool.

Jason and his broadcasting team completed the last of three 28-day trial broadcasts on FM in December 2004, which led to the submission to Ofcom for a full-time Community Radio Broadcasting Licence.

== Team ==
A group of business and Community leaders act as Community Directors. These are Godfrey Hainsworth Dip Ed (Retired School Master & Round the World Yachtsman), Peter Richardson (HSEQ Advisor), Keith Thomas ( Accountant), James Anderson (retired architect and radio engineer), Louise Anderson (Company Secretary), Danesh Kholi (Hotelier). Each of these individuals has publicly expressed enthusiasm for the Community Radio Project. These official directors are backed up by volunteers recruited locally, providing skills and points of view to the station.

== Transmitter ==
The transmitter is a dipole antenna located on top of the station's building in central Hartlepool. The transmitter is low powered broadcasting at 0.025 KW which is just enough to cover all of Hartlepool and the surrounding villages including Hart and Dalton Piercy.
