= Salford Jets =

Salford Jets are a British rock band that first formed in 1976 and performed until the early 1980s. The band re-formed in 2002.

== Biography ==
The band originally included Mike Sweeney, later of Piccadilly Radio and its later incarnations, breakfast DJ at Real Radio XS, Capital Gold and now morning presenter at BBC Radio Manchester. The other band members were Diccon Hubbard (bass), Rod Gerrard (guitar), Don Mac (guitar), Dave Morris (drums), Geoff Kerry (keyboards) and Johnny Sax. It was this line-up that would back Wayne Fontana and The Mindbenders for a short period.

The band had a Monday night residency on the "Top Road" in Pendlebury Swinton at The Duke of Wellington from '79-80.They had a hit single in 1980 called "Who You Looking At?" on RCA Records, which reached number 72 in the UK Singles Chart. This was their only song to make the Top 75, although "Gina (I've Got A Cortina)" made No 90 and "She's Gonna Break Your Heart" No 80. "Who You Looking At?" was re-released in aid of the Men Matter Appeal for the Christie Hospital. The compilation CD, The Manchester Boys, was released on Castle Records in 2006. The band did BBC Radio One sessions for Peter Powell, David Jensen and Mike Read, and appeared on the national TV programmes Lift Off, Get It Together and Fun Factory.

Since reforming in late 2002, they have gigged intermittently mostly in the North of England. The current members are Mike Sweeney, Bryn Williams, Andy Ashcroft, Carla Lewis and Phill Orme.
