= Rhubarb Radio (Birmingham) =

Birmingham, England; England
- Broadcast area: Internet

Programming
- Format: Talk

History
- First air date: August 2008

Links
- Website: www.rhubarbradio.com

The now defunct Rhubarb Radio (Birmingham) was an internet and community radio station in Birmingham, England. It began broadcasting test transmissions in August 2008 from its studio in the Custard Factory (see 2008 in British radio). As of November 2009, it had a regular audience of 3,500 and its website received 34,000 unique visitors.

Following a successful relaunch of its website in December 2009, Rhubarb Radio introduced listen again services for all of its programming. Allowing users to select any show within the last ten weeks and replay it. Since the relaunch, the site has attracted over 47,000 unique visitors with listeners from all over the world.

The station featured music and magazine shows, as well as streaming of live music events. As of July 2009, it was streaming from 23 live music venues in Birmingham, and had plans to increase the number to 100 over the following eighteen months.

It focused primarily on the local creative industries, and its contributors include artists, bloggers, musicians, poets, radio industry professionals, web designers, and others in the creative arts. It was established in response to what was considered a lack of "localness" on BBC and commercial radio in Birmingham.

Rhubarb Radio was nominated as one of Channel 4's ten recommended internet radio stations, and at the 2009 Midlands Media Awards, it won the Birmingham City Council Digital Innovation Award. The station's approach inspired similar initiatives in Berlin, Germany and Barcelona, Spain. It participated in a bmibaby-supported "creative exchange" with other European cities such as Amsterdam in April 2010. Rhubarb Radio also supported the Birmingham Social Media Café.

== See also ==
- Arts in Birmingham
- Media in Birmingham
- Rhubarb Radio (Wakefield)
