= XS Manchester =

Coordinates: 53.480543°N 2.253398°W

- Manchester; England
- Broadcast area: North West England
- Frequencies: FM: 106.1 MHz; DAB: 10C (Northampton); 10D (Herts, Beds and Bucks); 12D (Peterborough)

Programming
- Format: Rock/alternative

Ownership
- Owner: Communicorp UK

History
- First air date: 5 May 2008
- Last air date: 24 February 2025
- Former names: 106.1 Rock Radio; Real Radio XS

Links
- Website: xsmanchester.co.uk (Now redirects to: radiox.co.uk/90s/

XS Manchester was an Independent Local Radio station serving Greater Manchester, broadcasting a mix of indie and alternative rock music, speech and news output. The station was owned and operated by Communicorp UK and broadcast from studios at Spinningfields in Manchester. Up until its closure, it was Communicorp UK's only station that did not broadcast a programme service supplied by Global.

As of September 2024, the station broadcasts to a weekly audience of 112,000, according to RAJAR.

The station ended regular programming on 21 February 2025, and officially ceased transmission the following Monday, 24 February 2025, when Radio X offshoot 'Radio X 90s' took over the former XS frequencies.

== History ==
=== 106.1 Rock Radio ===
The station began technical test transmissions on 10 April 2008 and launched, as 106.1 Rock Radio, on 5 May 2008.

The station organised a 'Free one-day festival' to promote its launch. This was held at Cathedral Gardens, with headlining bands Bad Company and Gun with support acts Salford Jets, Letz Zep and Mercury. The performances started at 1:00pm with a countdown to 6:00pm when the station went live. The first voice heard on Rock Radio was the mid-morning presenter Moose. The station replicated the original 96.3 Rock Radio in Glasgow by featuring voiceover Nick Coady whose prerecorded humorous comments, considered controversial by some, were heard in between most music tracks.

Due to the mix of output, the original application was made under the name RockTalk. The licence competition included bids by existing licence holders Chrysalis and Emap as well as a number by smaller local groups. Chrysalis Radio's managing director expressed his surprise that the talk/rock hybrid won in preference to a dedicated talk or rock station, both of which had been offered by his group.

Both 106.1 Rock Radio in Manchester and 96.3 Rock Radio in Glasgow became popular stations amongst the local Rock and Metal music communities, and the stations expanded on to DAB digital Radio in Newcastle and London. However, after initial solid growth, audience numbers stalled, and alternative options were considered to find bigger audiences for the two frequencies.

=== Real Radio XS ===
Real Radio XS logo used until 2016.

On 28 July 2011, GMG Radio announced that the Manchester-based service would be re-branded as Real Radio XS, while the Glasgow-based sister station 96.3 Rock Radio would be sold. The decision was justified by the company on the grounds that the new Real Radio XS service would "benefit from the brand and scale of sister station Real Radio".

On 25 June 2012 it was announced that rival commercial radio operator Global Radio had bought GMG Radio. The division continued to operate separately until 2014 when, following Ofcom's regulatory review into GMG Radio's takeover, Global Radio announced that 106.1 Real Radio XS would be one of eight stations it would be selling to Communicorp.

=== XS Manchester ===
In March 2016, following the relaunch of former parent station Real Radio as Heart North West, Real Radio XS was rebranded as XS Manchester.

In May 2017, XS moved from Salford to new studios at the XYZ building in the Spinningfields district of Manchester City Centre. The station shares facilities with sister station Smooth North West and two Global-owned stations, Heart North West and Capital Manchester.

In December 2019, it was reported that Communicorp had sought permission from Ofcom to change the station format, which if approved would lead to the closure of XS, and Global’s Capital Xtra service being broadcast on 106.1FM in Manchester. In March 2020, this request was rejected by Ofcom.

In August 2024, cutbacks to XS' programming line-up led to the departures of three presenters and one producer. The station's only remaining presenter-led shows are at breakfast (7am-11am) and Drivetime (4-8pm) on weekdays with automated non-stop music at all other times, including weekends. Local news and traffic bulletins were not affected. However, by November 2024, a presenter-led show was reinstated on Saturday and Sunday mornings between 8am and 12pm.

== Closure ==
In January 2025, it was reported that a new ‘nations strategy’ would be adopted for sister stations Heart, Capital and Smooth, and that XS Manchester would close at the end of the following month, with 'Radio X 90s', one of three offshoots of the alternative radio station Radio X that launched the previous year, taking its place on all frequencies. The new national shows rumoured for Heart, Capital and Smooth were made official on 5 February that year, and a few days later, the date that XS Manchester would close was confirmed to be 24 February.

Scheduled programming came to an end on 21 February, with the station reverting to a stream of non-stop music and promotional material, in preparation for the switch to Radio X 90s, which occurred on Monday 24 February.

== Transmission ==
XS Manchester transmitted from City Tower (formerly the Sunley Building) in Piccadilly in Manchester city centre. It has an ERP of 1kW (500W vertical and 500W horizontal) on 106.1 MHz. The station is also available digitally, on the Trial Manchester small-scale DAB multiplex.

In October 2023, the station was added to the 10D (Herts, Beds and Bucks), 10C (Northampton) and 12D (Peterborough) DAB multiplexes, in place of Communicorp's digital-only station Radio Up, which had previously broadcast automated pop music programming.
