= Lisa Shaw (broadcaster) =

British radio presenter and journalist (1976–2021)

- Born: 19 June 1976; County Durham, England
- Died: 21 May 2021 (aged 44); Newcastle upon Tyne, England
- Spouse: Gareth Eve
- Children: 1
- Presenting career
- Station: BBC Radio Newcastle (2016–2021)
- Station: Century Radio/Real Radio North East/Heart North East (2004–2014)
- Style: Presenter
- Country: United Kingdom

Lisa Eve (née Shaw; 19 June 1976 – 21 May 2021) was a British radio presenter and journalist based in Newcastle upon Tyne, who worked in both commercial radio and for the BBC. An established radio personality in the North East, she co-presented a breakfast show alongside Gary Philipson for Century Radio (later Real Radio and Heart North East), before joining BBC Radio Newcastle in 2016. Shaw's death at the age of 44, attributed to the Oxford–AstraZeneca COVID-19 vaccine, was the subject of widespread media coverage.

== Life and career ==
Born and raised in County Durham, Shaw began her radio career at Newcastle's Metro Radio, which she joined as a journalist before going on to present for the station. In 2004, she moved to Century Radio (later Real Radio then Heart North East), where she twice co-presented Gary and Lisa at Breakfast alongside Gary Philipson, first in 2004 and again between 2010 and 2014. Shaw joined BBC Radio Newcastle in 2016, becoming part of the station's daytime presenting team. From 2020, she presented a weekday show for the station as part of a simplified schedule that was introduced by BBC radio during the COVID-19 pandemic, and aired between 10am and 2pm.

In addition to her work on radio, Shaw was a compere and voiceover artist, and wrote a column for regional newspaper The Sunday Sun. In 2012, she received a Sony Gold award for Best Breakfast Show in Britain for the show she presented with Philipson on what was then Real Radio.

== Death ==
Shaw presented her last programme for BBC Radio Newcastle on 7 May 2021. She died at Newcastle's Royal Victoria Infirmary on 21 May, aged 44. Her family told media reporters that, days after having received a first dose of the Oxford–AstraZeneca COVID-19 vaccine, Shaw, who was not known to have any underlying health problems, became seriously ill and was treated for blood clots and cerebral bleeding. On 27 May, it was reported that her death would be investigated in a coroner's inquest.

Sky News reported that senior Newcastle coroner Karen Dilks had issued an interim fact-of-death certificate citing a "complication of AstraZeneca COVID-19 virus vaccination" as a consideration. BBC News reported in August 2021 that the coroner had concluded in her final judgment that it was "clearly established" Shaw's death was caused by an extremely rare "vaccine-induced thrombotic thrombocytopenia", a condition which leads to a brain haemorrhage. The National Institute for Health and Care Excellence (NICE) published medical recommendations for the condition in July 2021 matching the treatment Shaw was given.

Shaw's funeral was held on 10 June at Durham Cathedral. Following the service her family announced plans to establish a charity to provide holidays and activities for bereaved children who have lost a parent. The charity, Lisa Shaw's Little'uns, is named after a feature on her BBC radio show.

== Personal life ==
Shaw was married to Gareth Eve, and was the mother of one child.
