= Mike Sweeney (DJ) =

British musician

Michael Thomas Sweeney (born 15 September 1947 in Salford, Lancashire, England) is a broadcaster and radio DJ.

== Education and early career ==
Sweeney attended Mount Carmel School in Salford, after which he worked at Associated Electrical Industries in Trafford Park. He was a platelayer at the docks, a labourer, a miner, a van driver, building site labourer and a computer programmer. He performed in a local band, the Salford Jets, as a singer and songwriter in the late 1970s and early 1980s. The band had three top-100 UK hit singles, one of which reached No. 72 in the UK Singles Charts in 1980.

Sweeney and his wife have lived in Uppermill since 1997.

== Radio career ==
By the age of 31 and onward he was regularly being interviewed on Manchester's Piccadilly radio station and had begun to make promotion jingles for his band's gigs for the station. He was then offered a 12-show trial as one of the station's disc jockeys; it was thought that his Salford accent would go down well with local audiences. He worked prime time slots on the station from 1981 into the late 1990s while branching out into interviewing, sports reportage and documentaries. He plays football, has boxed for Salford Lads' Club and also swum for the city. He also had his own Friday night show Sweeney's '60s Classics. He not only played the well-known classics but more obscure singles that had never been heard since the '60s.

He then became a DJ on Capital Gold in London in 1997 where he presented the morning show on Monday-Friday 10:00 am to 1:00 pm, the Capital Gold Rock Show on Friday nights, and Mike Sweeney's '60s Classics and at the Hop on Saturday nights until the station merged with Classic Gold. He presented the weekday drivetime slot until the summer of 2009. He then joined Rock Radio (later Real XS) to host the breakfast programme and The Million Sellers Show on Smooth '70s.

Sweeney is currently working for BBC Radio Manchester, hosting the morning show Monday to Thursday from 10 am until 2 pm. Sweeney still sings with the Salford Jets and with two other groups, the Mindbenders and the Swinging Blue Jeans. His acoustic duo, Mike Sweeney and Paddy O'Hare launched in 2012. They are working on an EP titled Walking Down the Line, which will be released in 2013.

On TV, Sweeney's Elvis Has Just Left the Building is still showing on Sky's Men & Motors. He also presented the Manchester United Debate Show on Channel M from 2007 to 2009 and a classic car series for Sky in 2000.

Sweeney has won two New York Radio awards, a Sony in 2002 and Guardian Media Group's Presenter of the Year in 2009. The Radio Academy gave him a Lifetime Achievement award in 2011. He was named The Variety Children's Charity Radio Industry Legend in 2012.
