= Tyne Bridge Tower =

Tower block in Gateshead, England

Coordinates: 54°58′00″N 1°36′13″W

The tower block in 2007. The Sage Centre is behind at left

The Tyne Bridge Tower was a tower block that stood at the foot of the Tyne Bridge on the Gateshead side of the River Tyne, near the medieval St Mary's Church and the Sage Centre. It was constructed in the 1960s. The 13-floor building was used by the Inland Revenue until June 2005, after which it stood empty until its demolition in March 2011. The demolition was funded by One North East, a regional development agency. Total cost was just over £500,000.
