= Radio Academy =

Charity in the United Kingdom

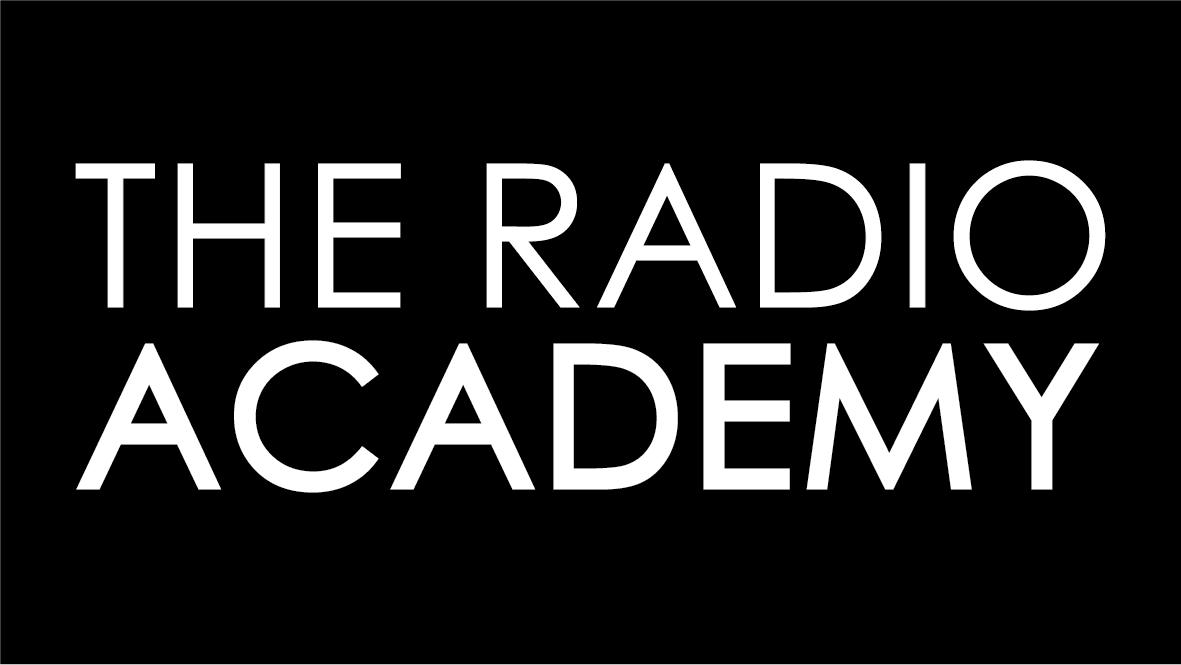
The Radio Academy Logo (2024)

The Radio Academy is a registered charity dedicated to "the encouragement, recognition and promotion of excellence in UK broadcasting and audio production". It was formed in 1983 and is run via a board of trustees, with a chair and a deputy chair, and a managing director. Their responsibilities include designing, planning, and implementing projects and programmes.

== Events ==
The Radio Academy runs a range of events throughout the year, including the annual Radio Academy Festival.

The Academy also runs regular Masterclasses for young people who would like to work in radio. In addition, the Academy's Branches regularly hold local events across the country.

== Honours and awards ==
Since 2016, The Radio Academy has run The Audio & Radio Industry Awards (The ARIAS), annual prizes for the best programmes and presenters of the past year. Previously, it had organised the Sony Radio Academy Awards (started in 1983), which ended in 2014.

Throughout its existence, The Radio Academy has organised various honours schemes, including The UK Radio Hall of Fame, Fellowships, the John Peel Award for Outstanding Contribution to Music Radio, the PPL Music Icon Award, the Local and Regional Lifetime Achievement Award, the Radio Production Awards, and the Most Played Artist on British Radio.

In 2011, the Radio Academy launched its annual 30 Under 30 scheme, recognising talented young people in the industry by publishing a list of 30 "ones to watch" each year.

== Hall of Fame ==
The UK Radio Hall of Fame was started in the mid-2000s to honour the stars of British radio that have longevity and success in their broadcasting careers. In its initial years, honours were given at a ceremony each December held at the Savoy Hotel.

== Fellows ==
The highest honour The Radio Academy can confer upon a member of the UK radio/audio industry is a Fellowship of the Academy. Fellowships are awarded to recognise individuals who have made outstanding contributions to the industry and/or the Academy, usually from behind the scenes rather than in front of the microphone. Several new Fellowships are announced each year.

== Patrons ==
Patrons of the Radio Academy are organisations and companies that contribute to its charitable works by bulk-buying Membership for their staff.

== Managing Directors/CEOs ==
- John Bradford: 1992–2006
- Trevor Dann: 2006–2010
- John Myers: 2010–2013
- Paul Robinson: 2013–2014
- Roger Cutsforth: 2015–2018
- Sean Childerley: 2018–2019
- John Dash: 2019–2020
- Sam Bailey: 2021–2023
- Aradhna Tayal Leach: 2023–
