= Nation Radio Scotland =

Radio station in Renfrewshire and Glasgow, Scotland

Coordinates: 55.8299°N 4.5428°W

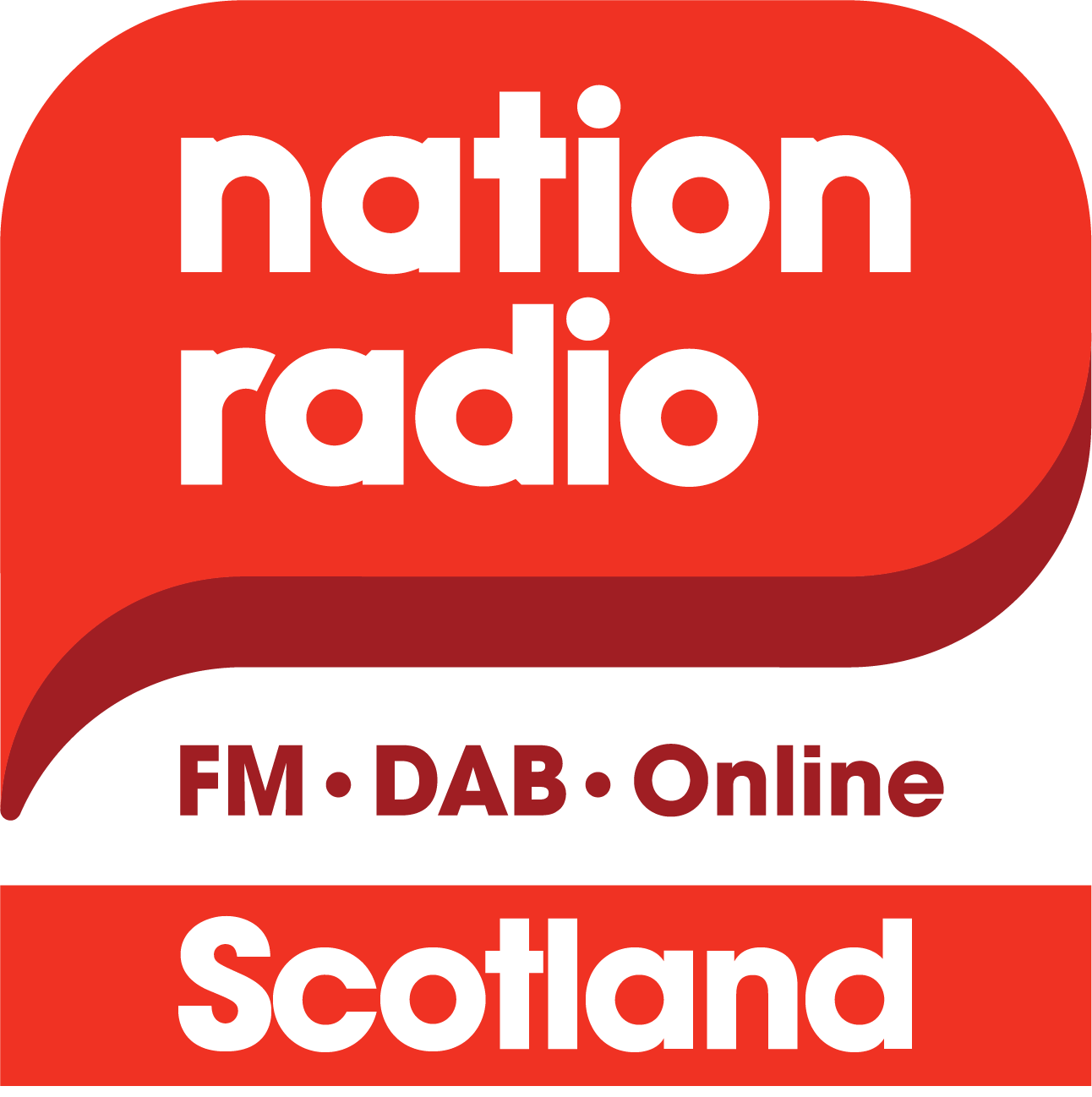
- Glasgow; United Kingdom
- Broadcast area: West Central Scotland
- Frequencies: FM: 96.3 MHz (Glasgow and Paisley); 103.0 MHz (West Dumbartonshire); 106.9 MHz (Helensburgh)

Programming
- Format: Chart and classic pop music
- Network: Nation Radio

Ownership
- Owner: Nation Broadcasting
- Sister stations: Nation Radio

Links
- Website: Nation Radio Scotland

Nation Radio Scotland (formerly XFM Scotland (2014), 96.3 Rock Radio Real XS, Q96 and 96.3QFM) is an Independent Local Radio station for Renfrewshire, Glasgow and West Central Scotland, owned by Nation Broadcasting.

As of September 2024, the station broadcasts to a weekly audience of 141,000, according to RAJAR.

== History ==
The station launched in January 2007 as 96.3 Rock Radio, a classic rock station owned by GMG Radio who had bought the licence previously owned by UTV Radio and branded as Q96, a mainstream music station. The station shared news and sport coverage with associated stations Real Radio and Smooth Radio but carried emphasis on Renfrewshire issues to fulfill its licensing requirement, such as lead sport stories from St Mirren. On 28 July 2011 it was announced that GMG Radio would be rebranding sister station 106.1 Rock Radio as Real Radio XS for its Manchester audience. Around the same time, the managing director announced his departure from the station and entered talks with GMG Radio on buying out the station along with a group of private investors. Two months later, GMG announced the station would not be sold off and would be rebranded as '96.3 Real Radio XS' at the end of October 2011.

Following the sale of GMG Radio to Global Radio, and the resulting sale of several stations to Communicorp to operate mostly under brand licences from Global, more detail about how this would affect Real XS was confirmed. Whilst Capital Scotland would be among the stations taken over by Communicorp, Real XS in Paisley would be retained by Global, alongside 105.2 Smooth Radio and Real Radio Scotland, with Real relaunched as Heart (with all Real stations) and Real XS taking the Xfm affiliation. This would result in XS retaining local programming at key times, but during networked hours taking these shows from Xfm London, as Xfm Manchester already did, rather than taking programmes from Real XS in Manchester, which was sold to Communicorp and continues as an independent classic rock station.

It was confirmed in March 2014 that the relaunch would take place on 7 April. At other times, the station simulcast Xfm London output.

The station was based at Baillieston to the east of Glasgow and broadcast as XFM to Renfrewshire, Ayrshire, West Central Scotland and Central Scotland until the end of 2015.

XFM Scotland ceased transmission on 96.3 FM at around 6:20pm on Sunday 13 September 2015, after Global Radio decided to hand the licence back to Ofcom, ahead of XFM's relaunch as Radio X. The original broadcast licence was cancelled and a new licence for covering a wider geographical area was advertised for Glasgow and The West of Scotland. Four operators bid to win the licence, Bauer Media, DC Thomson, GO Radio (Glasgow) and Rockscot Ltd, led by Ciaran O'Toole, being the successful applicant. Online test transmissions commenced on Monday 2 October 2017. On 13 March 2018, Rockscot Ltd was sold to Nation Broadcasting, leading to the departure of the Rockscot management.

It was later confirmed that the station would launch as 'Nation Radio Scotland' in the autumn of 2018. The station will share branding with Nation's regional station in South Wales but is not permitted to share any programming. Test transmissions for 96.3FM began on 30 August, with an official launch on Monday 3 September.

== Programming ==
Local programming is broadcast from 6am to 1pm, 4pm to 8pm Monday to Friday and from 6am to 1pm on weekends. The rest of the time it takes networked programming from Nation Radio London, with opt-outs for news, sport, travel and weather updates. During local programming, the station plays a separate playlist to Nation Radio London.
