= Heart North West =

Coordinates: 53.480543°N 2.253398°W

- Manchester; United Kingdom
- Broadcast area: North West England
- Frequencies: FM: Manchester, Liverpool, Cheshire, South and West Lancashire: 105.4; North Lancashire, Preston, Carnforth, Barrow-in-Furness and South Cumbria: 96.9; Windermere, Ambleside, Grasmere: 102.3; Kendal: 103.2; DAB: 10C Liverpool; DAB+: 11B Morecambe Bay; DAB: 12A Lancashire; DAB: 12C Manchester
- Branding: This is Heart

Programming
- Format: AC
- Network: Heart

Ownership
- Owner: Global
- Sister stations: Capital Manchester and Lancashire; Smooth North West; Smooth Lake District

History
- First air date: 8 September 1998

Links
- Website: Heart North West; Heart North Lancashire & Cumbria

Heart North West is a regional radio station owned and operated by Global as part of the Heart network. It broadcasts to North West England.

== Overview ==
=== Century Radio (1998–2009) ===
The station opened as Century Radio on 8 September 1998 as the second Century station in the country (the first being Gateshead-based 100-102 Century Radio). Owned and operated by Border Television, Century was founded by managing director John Myers, who had also established the north east station four years earlier. Like the first station, Myers also presented the breakfast show under the pseudonym John Morgan.

The station's launch was the subject of an episode of a BBC Two fly-on-the-wall documentary Trouble at the Top, mainly following Myers. The episode, entitled "Degsy Rides Again", showed Myers' attempts to train lunchtime phone-in host Derek Hatton, a controversial local ex-politician who had never before presented on radio. Myers was not confident enough in Hatton for him to appear on pre-launch publicity, although his show "The Degsy Debate" performed well at the first RAJAR. Also amongst its launch presenters was controversial shock jock Scottie McClue.

The documentary also covered the station's acquisition of exclusive commentary rights for Manchester United F.C.'s games. They remained United's official radio partner for almost a decade until selling the rights to Xfm Manchester for the 2007–08 season.

Myers left the group to head GMG Radio, overseeing the launch of the similar Real Radio brand. Capital Radio bought the Century network, and was subsequently acquired by GCap Media. GMG Radio acquired the Century stations in October 2006, reuniting Myers and John Simons (programme director on the original Gateshead station) with the brand.

=== Real Radio (2009–2014) ===
Century was re-branded as Real Radio on Monday 30 March 2009.

On 15 October 2012, Real Radio announced the station would increase its amount of networked programming. Weekday daytime shows, from 10 am to 4 pm and presented by Darren Parks and Debbie Mac, were networked across all Real Radio stations on Monday 5 November 2012 with further networked shows introduced at the weekend.

=== Heart (2014–) ===
On 25 June 2012 it was announced Global (the owner of stations such as Capital and Heart) had bought GMG Radio. The former GMG stations, including Real Radio, continued to operate separately as 'Real and Smooth Limited' until 1 April 2014.

On 6 February 2014, Global announced it would be rebranding all Real Radio stations as Heart. Real Radio North West began a gradual transition to the Heart branding on 24 March 2014 and phased out the Real Radio branding on Sunday 20 April 2014. On 1 May 2014, local programming moved from Laser House in Salford to nearby Exchange Quay, sharing facilities with sister stations Capital Manchester and XFM Manchester. The full relaunch as Heart North West took place at 6 am on Tuesday 6 May 2014.

On 12 June 2017, local programming moved from Salford to new studios at the XYZ building in the Spinningfields district of Manchester City Centre. Heart North West shares facilities with its sister station Capital Manchester and Lancashire and two Communicorp-owned stations, Smooth North West and Radio X 90s.

==== Consolidation ====
On 26 February 2019, Global announced sister station Heart North Lancashire & Cumbria would close and merge with Heart North West.

On 3 June 2019, following further deregulation, local breakfast and weekend shows were replaced with network programming from London. Regional output was reduced to a three-hour drivetime show on weekdays, plus localised news bulletins, traffic updates and advertising.

All four of Heart North West's presenters, including breakfast presenters Joel Ross and Lorna Bancroft and weekend presenter Faye Bamford, left the station.

==== End of regional programming ====
As of 24 February 2025, all programming originates from Global's London headquarters, following the end of the regional drivetime show from Manchester. Local news and traffic updates were not affected.

== News ==
Global's Manchester hub broadcasts hourly localised news bulletins from 6:00 am to 7:00 pm on weekdays and from 6:00 am to 12:00 pm on weekends, with headlines on the half hour during breakfast and drivetime shows.

Separate bulletins are produced for the North West of England and the licence area previously served by Heart North Lancashire & Cumbria.

== Notable former presenters ==
- Wes Butters (now at Hits Radio)
- Rich Clarke (now at BBC Radio Berkshire and Magic Radio)
- Joel Ross (now at Hits Radio)
- Ryan Seacrest (continues at On Air With Ryan Seacrest)
- Kate Thornton (now at Greatest Hits Radio)
