= Q96 =

Q96 (96.3 QFM)

Scotland
- Broadcast area: Renfrewshire
- Frequency: 96.3 MHz

Programming
- Format: Classic Hits and Current Hits

Ownership
- Owner: GMG Radio

History
- First air date: 1 September 1992
- Last air date: 22 December 2006

Q96 was an Independent Local Radio station that broadcast for 14 years in the Scottish county of Renfrewshire. Q96 broadcast as an FM station on the 96.3 MHz frequency after a local licence for the Paisley area was offered. The station was latterly based outside its dedicated broadcast region in the Baillieston area of neighbouring Glasgow at the headquarters it shared with sister station Real Radio after Ofcom approval.

The station was replaced by 96.3 Rock Radio for test transmissions on 22 December 2006 and officially from Monday 8 January 2007.

== History ==
Q96 first went live on 1 September 1992, broadcasting from Paisley as a local radio station for Paisley, and Renfrewshire. Despite being centralised on Paisley, Scotland's largest town, the many commuters from Renfrewshire into Glasgow, as well as the proximity of Glasgow and Dunbartonshire, allowed the signal to be easily received and thus generated listeners in those areas.

During the station's early years, it used the Supergold sustaining service after midnight until the resumption of normal programming in the morning. The station was bought by IRG in December 1995 and rebranded as 96.3 QFM the following year.

Q96 broadcast on both DAB and FM to West Central Scotland from its mast on Paisley's Gleniffer Braes and online. It initially proved successful in breaking into the market with its music, which included songs from the 1960s through present day hits. Audiences peaked at around 12% on the Rajar scale, a highly respectable figure for a local radio station.

After good initial audience figures, the number of listeners started dropping. Mainly this could be attributed to the increasing competition from the then-dominant Radio Clyde stations as well as other local stations. After outgrowing its base in Lady Lane in the West End of Paisley, it relocated to an industrial unit in Kinning Park in neighbouring Glasgow, a move outside the broadcasting area, which was seen by locals of Paisley as a snub, a claim management denied and stated that it was due to a lack of affordable suitable property in Renfrewshire. The move to Glasgow was announced on-air as welcoming people to a 'new station' and 'Glasgow's QFM'. With sensitivities about the move from Paisley still high, this, as well as a lack of Renfrewshire material, saw complaints to Ofcom which duly warned the station about ignoring its licence requirements for that stated it broadcast to Renfrewshire and must include Renfrewshire material. The move to Glasgow was accompanied in an attempt to capture the falling number of listeners by taking on rival stations with a move to a format of mainly pop and chart music from the present day. This saw limited success due to a saturation of the area from similar stations.

A takeover by The Wireless Group saw it revert to its original name of Q96 and join a network that included the national Talksport station. Audience levels continued to be low and erratic and changes in management soon followed. This saw it take up the more acceptable 'tag line' of 'Renfrewshire's Q96', and the station reverted away from pop music back to its still of classic and new hits as it was at inception. The Wireless Group itself was taken over by UTV Radio, which looked to reverse the fall and managed to introduce a strong programming line-up with good presenters. At the time, its market share was around 7%.

GMG Radio acquired the station from UTV Radio, with the acquisition completed on 1 October 2006. GMG Radio moved it from the station's second home in Kinning Park to Baillieston after Ofcom approval, but agreed to honour the station's local format. In any case, Q96 effectively ended with the move to Baillieston – many presenters left and the schedule became increasingly automated.

The station stuttered on when the announcement of rebranding was made to 96.3 Rock Radio, a classic rock station for the area. Only five presenters remained; most would transfer to Real Radio, and others would continue onto the new Rock Radio. On Friday 22 December the last words were spoken on Q96 by programme controller Ciaran O'Toole before test broadcasts for Rock Radio commenced. These were, "What a year 2006 has been and looking forward to 2007, so from me to you, that was Q96," followed by the Q96 jingle. Shortly afterward Rock Radio jingles were played and RDS changed to Rock whilst DAB radios amended to show 96.3 Rock Radio.

== Successors ==
From 8 January 2007, the station was replaced by 96.3 Rock Radio, a classic rock music station. The station was rebranded to '96.3 Real Radio XS' in October 2011, and later 'XFM Scotland' in April 2014. The station was closed and its licence was handed back to Ofcom on 4 September 2015.

Following a few years of silence, the frequency was re-advertised and is now occupied by Nation Radio Scotland.
