= Heart Yorkshire =

- Leeds; United Kingdom
- Broadcast area: South and West Yorkshire
- Frequencies: FM: South and West Yorkshire 106.2 MHz; Bradford and Halifax 107.6 MHz; Sheffield and Rotherham 107.7 MHz DAB: 11B (Bradford and Huddersfield) DAB: 11C (S Yorks) DAB: 12D (W Yorkshire)
- Branding: This is Heart

Programming
- Format: Hot Adult Contemporary
- Network: Heart

Ownership
- Owner: Communicorp UK
- Operator: Global
- Sister stations: Capital Yorkshire

History
- First air date: 25 March 2002 (as Real Radio); 6 May 2014 (as Heart Yorkshire)

Links
- Website: Heart Yorkshire

Heart Yorkshire (previously Real Radio Yorkshire) is a regional radio station owned by Communicorp UK and operated by Global as part of the Heart network. It broadcasts to South and West Yorkshire.

== Overview ==
=== Real Radio ===
Real Radio Yorkshire launched on 25 March 2002. The station transmitted from Emley Moor on 106.2 MHz FM, which covers the majority of South Yorkshire and West Yorkshire, including Barnsley, York, Selby, Harrogate, Doncaster, Huddersfield, Leeds, Rotherham and Wakefield. It also broadcast from Idle on 107.6 MHz FM to Bradford and Halifax, and on 107.7 MHz FM from Tapton Hill to Sheffield. Real Radio Yorkshire also broadcast across the whole of Yorkshire on DAB using the Regional MXR multiplex.

=== Heart ===
On 25 June 2012 it was announced Global (the owner of stations such as Capital and Heart) had bought GMG Radio. The former GMG stations, including Real Radio, continued to operate separately as 'Real and Smooth Limited' until 1 April 2014.

On 6 February 2014, Global announced it would be rebranding all Real Radio stations as Heart. On 1 May 2014, local programming moved from Tingley, Wakefield to share facilities with sister station Capital Yorkshire in Hanover Walk, Leeds.

The full relaunch as Heart Yorkshire took place on Tuesday 6 May 2014. The station's audience share increased from 5.5% to over 7% following the relaunch. In June 2015 the Yorkshire MXR multiplex closed. Heart Yorkshire moved their services to local multiplexes in Leeds, Bradford and Sheffield, however they chose not to take up options in Hull and York.

In February 2019, following OFCOM's decision to relax local content obligations from commercial radio, Global announced it would replace Heart Yorkshire's local breakfast and weekend shows with networked programming from London.

From 3 June 2019, the station's local output consisted of a three-hour Drivetime show on weekdays hosted by Dixie & Emma, alongside local news bulletins, traffic updates and advertising.

As of 24 February 2025 all programming originates from Global's London headquarters, including Heart Drive, presented each weekday by JK and Kelly Brook.

== News ==
Journalists within Yorkshire produce hourly regional news bulletins from 6 am–7 pm on weekdays and 6 am–12 pm at weekends.

== Former notable presenters ==
- Wes Butters
- Rich Clarke
- Gary Davies
- Daryl Denham
- Martin Kelner
- Dixie & Emma
- Debbie Lindley
- Ryan Seacrest
- Graeme Smith
- Chris Tarrant
- Kate Thornton
