= Bob Phillis =

Sir Robert Weston Phillis (3 December 1945 – 22 December 2009) was a British media executive with experience both in broadcasting organisations and the press.

== Early life ==
He was educated at John Ruskin Grammar School in Croydon, where he was born, and in 1968 gained a first in Industrial Economics from Nottingham University, briefly lecturing at the institution.

Before university Phillis had been an apprentice printer, and returned to the industry as an executive working for Thomson Regional Newspapers and the British Printing Corporation, but briefly returned to an academic career as a lecturer in industrial relations at Edinburgh University and the Scottish Business School (1971–75).

== Career ==
After a period from 1979 at Independent Television Publications, responsible for TVTimes, he became managing director of Central Television in 1981, moving to Carlton Communications in 1987 and ITN in 1991. He was the deputy director general of the BBC from 1993, under John Birt being responsible for the World Service (1993–94) and BBC Worldwide (1994–97), Birt described Phillis as having been "invaluable and supportive" when Phillis left the corporation.

The chief executive of the Guardian Media Group from 1997 to 2006, he oversaw the absorption of Trader Media, publisher of Auto Trader magazine. In 2004, Tony Blair asked him to head a committee looking into the effectiveness of government communications, though his recommendations "were set aside or watered down".

== Personal life ==
Bob Phillis, knighted in 2004, was married with three sons. He died from cancer.

Cultural offices
Preceded by Will Wyatt	President of the Royal Television Society; 2004–2009	Succeeded by Peter Bazalgette
