= GMG Radio =

British radio station company

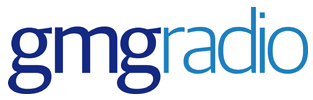
- Industry: Media
- Founded: 1999
- Defunct: May 2014
- Headquarters: Salford, Greater Manchester
- Key people: John Myers (1999–2009), Stuart Taylor
- Products: Broadcasting
- Parent: Guardian Media Group; Global Radio
- Website: realandsmooth.co.uk

GMG Radio was a company that owned the Real Radio and Smooth Radio networks. As GMG Radio, the company was the radio division of the Guardian Media Group until it was bought in 2012 by Global Radio. Pending regulatory review of the merger, the company was renamed Real and Smooth Limited and operated as a separate entity until May 2014.

== History ==
=== GMG Radio ===
GMG Radio was Guardian Media Group's radio division, which started in early 1999 when former GMG Chief Executive Sir Robert Phillis enlisted the services of John Myers to establish GMG's radio division after seeing Myers on the documentary programme Trouble at the Top. Myers had featured in an episode that followed him as he prepared to launch Century 105 in the North West for Border Radio Holdings. Myers had left the Century stations and, after a brief spell in charge of Radio Investments Ltd, created GMG Radio Holdings Ltd and became its managing director.

The Station's first FM licence was won in April 2000 for the South Wales regional FM licence, which went on air on 3 October 2000, but was unsuccessful in its second application, for the West Midlands regional licence application, won by Saga.

In June 2001, Scot FM was brought from The Wireless Group for £25.5m John Myers said: "The problem with Scot FM is that it has changed owners faster than I've changed coats. It was badly launched. They gave the impression that they were going to do Radio 4 type speech and then they went and hired Scottie McClue. For the first time, Scot FM will have an owner that might give Scottish Radio Holdings a run for their money." Real Radio Scotland began broadcasting at 8 am on Tuesday 8 January 2002 with breakfast presenter Robin Galloway introducing the first song to be played, "A Star is Born".

On 6 July 2001, the company won its second Real Radio licence, a West/South Yorkshire regional FM licence, which launched on 25 March 2002.

In May 2002, GMG radio made a bid of £41 million to Jazz FM plc at 180p a share. The bid came on the day when the draft Communication Bill was published Jazz FM plc's largest shareholder, Clear Channel had been waiting for a 220p a share bid, but agreed to the 180p a share bid in late May. Herald Investment Management who had a 7.7% stake in the company and Aberforth Partners were not happy with the 180p a share bid. On 6 June, GMG raised its bid to 195p a share to secure the institutional shareholders who were holding out for a better bid. Richard Wheatly announced that he would leave Jazz FM once the takeover was complete. The offer was declared wholly unconditional on 5 July. In December 2002, GMG moved its sales operation from Clear Channel Radio Sales to the Chrysalis Group, in line with the sales operation for other GMG Radio stations.

On 12 July 2004, GMG Radio relaunched ejazz.fm, a dedicated jazz website. In January 2005 it launched a service, named Hear It, Buy It, Burn It, to permit users to legally download music from its station's websites. In February 2005, Myers announced that they had scrapped plans to launch Channel M Radio, a 24-hour news and talk station for Manchester due to commercial viability issues.

In March 2005, the Guardian Media Group rejected a £115 million bid from the Chrysalis Group for the GMG Radio division. In June 2005 London station 102.2 Jazz FM was rebranded to 102.2 Smooth FM after disappointing RAJAR figures. At the same time, ejazz.fm was renamed to jazzfm.com and initially appeared on DAB in Yorkshire, South Wales, and the Severn Estuary and on Sky Digital.

In August 2006, GMG sold its share in Rolling News channel DNN. The five regional stations on DAB were then closed down by Chrysalis to be replaced by LBC. On 18 December 2006, it was announced that GMG Radio had bought the four Saga Radio branded stations. GMG rebranded the Saga stations along with its existing Smooth FM stations in March 2007 to Smooth Radio.

On 6 October 2008, jazzfm.com was relaunched as Jazz FM across several DAB multiplexes in the UK, using space on local and regional multiplexes from existing GMG Radio stations as well as launching on digital television platforms. In November 2008 GMG was awarded the last analogue licence in the UK (covering North and mid Wales). They intend to operate the licence using the Real Radio (Wales) format basing its studios in Wrexham.

On 18 October 2006, it was announced that GMG Radio had bought the two Century branded stations from Gcap Media. The Century brand was originally launched by Myers and Simons in North East England in 1994, while they were at Border Television. On 18 December 2008, it was announced that Century Radio was to be re-branded as Real Radio on 30 March 2009.

In April 2009, the Jazz FM name and branding owned by GMG since 2002 were bought by the chief executive of the since formed Jazz FM Investments Ltd, Richard Wheatly. Jazz FM transitioned from GMG's local and regional DAB slots to a single slot on the Digital One national DAB ensemble bought by Jazz FM Investments Ltd in 2011.

GMG radio announced that out of peak time hours news would be shared by news hubs. As a result, there was one in Glasgow, one in London and the largest, which was Century Radio's headquarters in Manchester, headed by James Rea. During this period, Manchester broadcast a "Sky News" type bulletin, to which all GMG Radio stations in northern England opted in on the hour.

=== Global Radio buyout of GMG Radio ===
On 25 June 2012, it was announced Global Radio (the owner of stations such as Capital and Heart) had bought GMG Radio; however, the GMG radio stations would continue to operate separately until a regulatory review into the sale was carried out.

== Real and Smooth ==
On 11 October 2012, The Secretary of State Maria Miller announced that Global Radio's takeover of GMG Radio would not be investigated on the grounds of plurality. The Competition Commission was due to publish its final report on 27 March 2013. On 21 February 2013, it was confirmed that the decision whether Global Radio could take over all GMG Radio's assets would be delayed, until 22 May 2013, two months later than planned.

On 21 May 2013, the Competition Commission published their final report into Global Radio's acquisition of GMG Radio, stating that Global had to sell radio stations in seven areas of the UK. The stations Global would be required to sell were as follows:

- East Midlands: Smooth or Capital
- Cardiff and South Wales: Real or Capital
- North Wales: Real or Heart
- Greater Manchester and the North-West: Capital or Real XS with either Real or Smooth
- North East: Real or Smooth or Capital
- South and West Yorkshire: Real or Capital
- Central Scotland: Real or Capital

On 14 June 2013, Global Radio appealed against this decision by the Competition Commissions to sell off certain stations.

On 6 February 2014, Global agreed to sell eight stations to the Irish company Communicorp for £35 million. These are

- Smooth East Midlands, Smooth North West, Smooth North East,
- Capital Scotland, Capital South Wales,
- Real Radio North Wales, Real Radio Yorkshire and
- Real XS Manchester.

== Stations ==
=== Jazz FM (UK) ===
Jazz FM is a contemporary jazz radio network, controlled by GMG radio from 2002 until April 2009, when Richard Wheatly bought the station.

=== Smooth Radio ===
Smooth was an adult contemporary radio station that broadcast in five different areas, mainly in northern England, central Scotland and Wales, aimed at an audience 45 years old and over.

=== Real Radio ===
Real Radio was an adult contemporary radio station that broadcast in five different areas mainly in northern England, central Scotland and Wales, aimed at an audience 25–45 years old.

=== Rock Radio ===
Rock Radio was a classic rock station in Glasgow and Manchester.
