= Wood and Walters =

British TV series (1981–1982)

- Created by: Victoria Wood
- Directed by: Stuart Orme
- Starring: Victoria Wood; Julie Walters; John Dowie; Rik Mayall; Michael Angelis; Roger Brierley; Jill Summers; Duncan Preston; Robert Longden
- Country of origin: United Kingdom
- Original language: English
- No. of series: 1
- No. of episodes: 7

Production
- Producers: Peter Eckersley (pilot); Brian Armstrong (pilot)
- Running time: 25 minutes per episode
- Production company: Granada Television

Original release
- Network: ITV
- Release: 1 January 1981 – 21 February 1982

Wood and Walters is a British television comedy sketch show starring Julie Walters and Victoria Wood for Granada Television and written entirely by Wood. The show was short-lived, with one pilot in 1981 and a series of seven shows in 1982.

== Background ==
Both women had first met at Manchester Polytechnic in 1970: Wood was hoping to enroll, and Walters was coming to the end of her course. They met again in 1978 when they both appeared in the same revue, In at the Death, at the Bush Theatre in London.

Wood had been initially spotted by Granada's head of drama, Peter Eckersley, performing in her self-written play Talent at Sheffield's Crucible Theatre, who asked her to recreate it for television; Eckersley was married to actress Anne Reid, who would later appear as Jean in Wood's 1998 sitcom dinnerladies. The TV adaptation of Talent and its sequel, Nearly a Happy Ending, would also co-star Walters.

== Pilot – Wood and Walters: Two Creatures Great and Small ==
- Broadcast 1 January 1981

After she had turned down the female role in the satirical sketch show Not the Nine O'Clock News in 1979, Eckersley offered Wood a sketch show of her own in 1980. However, Wood agreed only on the understanding that Walters received equal billing, not feeling confident enough as yet to go it alone. Wood had in fact only ever written one sketch three years earlier before being given her own show. She fell back on songs, which she felt was her strength, the pilot contained four in 30 minutes. The sketches concerned themselves with Marriage Guidance Council, keep fit classes, DIY and gossip. Wood hated the finished result, so was very surprised that the show was nominated for a BAFTA for Best Light Entertainment Programme alongside The Two Ronnies, The Kenny Everett Video Show and The Stanley Baxter Series (which won).

== Series ==
- Broadcast 1 January 1982 – 21 February 1982

For the series a year later, the 'Two Creatures Great and Small' adjunct had been dropped, as critics commenting on Wood's weight had been beginning to get to her (though she did also say later she was delighted that she was once described as "dominating the stage like a witty tank").

The show was not a happy experience as, in the intervening time since the pilot, the show's producer (and Wood's mentor) Peter Eckersley had died of cancer. It was a terrible blow to Wood who said "he had lots of ideas for the series…but he never told me what they were. His value to me was inestimable. He had a marvellous eye for what was unnecessary and great attention to detail. He had liked the first material for the series but never saw any of the other stuff." Wood was not impressed by his replacement for the series, Brian Armstrong, and was of the opinion that he had hired several unsuitable actors.

The studio audience was generally filled with pensioners who often had difficulty understanding Wood's refined humour. Before one sketch, the warm up man had to explain to them what a boutique was. Wood said she heard one disgusted audience member say to her friend: "You realise we’re missing Brideshead for this".

Sketches for Wood and Walters included

- The Woman With 740 Children, in which Wood played a woman who overdosed on a fertility drug. Much to her surprise, Granada hired 70 babies to appear in the sketch.
- ‘Girl Talking’ was an expert parody of social realist documentaries, and
- ‘Northerners’ was a song parodying stereotypes of the North of England.

A regular character on the show was Dotty. The items entitled "Dotty's Slot" featured Walters as Dotty, who performed a witty monologue by a middle-class housewife discussing all matters national and trivial, such as in the sketch ‘Dotty on Women’s Lib’. As a character, she shares many similarities with a later Wood creation 'Kitty' (as played by Patricia Routledge).

Rik Mayall also appeared in a one-off monologue as a chauvinistic feminist called Mitch, filling a similar guest slot as he had with Kevin Turvey in the sketch show A Kick Up the Eighties. Another alternative comedy innovator to appear on the show was John Dowie, who had already toured with Wood in 1978.

Wood's view of the series was "Some bits of it were good, some deadly".

Around this time, Wood made a weekly musical appearance in the BBC Radio 2 show The Little and Large Party, narrated an Arts Council film on the pantomime dame, and was profiled in the schools programme Scene. Walters would also appear with Michael Angelis in 1982 as his wife in Alan Bleasdale's Boys from the Blackstuff.

Wood and Walters place in British comedy history can be seen as that of a dry run for the more popular and acclaimed Victoria Wood: As Seen on TV which aired on BBC television between 1985 and 1987, which shared some of the same elements such as pseudo-documentaries, songs, sketches, as well as co-starring Walters and Preston.

Although consisting of seven episodes, the seventh in the series was a compilation of sketches and songs pulled from the earlier six parts and the pilot.

== Home media ==
The series was released on DVD by Network on 18 October 2010. The release included all seven episodes and the original "Two Creatures Great and Small" pilot episode on a single disc.
