= Acorn Antiques: The Musical! =

2005 British musical

- Acorn Antiques: The Musical! poster
- Music: Victoria Wood
- Lyrics: Victoria Wood
- Book: Victoria Wood
- Basis: Acorn Antiques
- Productions: 2005 West End; 2007 UK tour

Acorn Antiques: The Musical! is a musical about an antiques dealer, based on the parodic soap opera of the same name by Victoria Wood. It premiered in the West End in 2005, and starred Julie Walters and Celia Imrie. The musical won the Olivier Award for Best Performance in a Supporting Role in a Musical and was nominated as Best New Musical.

== Concept and production ==
Victoria Wood decided to revive the original concept to satirise musical theatre with Acorn Antiques: The Musical!, with the intent to give people a "lovely, happy night in the theatre.". It was directed by Trevor Nunn, and opened at the Theatre Royal, Haymarket in February 2005 for a three-month sell-out run. Parodying successful musicals such as Les Misérables and Chicago, it also caricatured the trend for socio-realism in contemporary drama and the conventions of song and choreography in musicals.

=== Casting ===
The musical featured three of the principal actors from the original reprising their roles: Celia Imrie as Miss Babs, Duncan Preston as Mr Clifford, and Julie Walters as Mrs Overall. Wood understudied the latter role, appearing on Monday nights and Wednesday matinees, in order to relieve pressure on Walters while preventing disappointment for audiences. Wood's original character, Miss Berta, was played during workshops by Janie Dee; when Dee was unavailable for the West End run, she was replaced by Sally Ann Triplett. The musical also introduced Miss Bonnie (Josie Lawrence), a sister of Miss Babs and Miss Berta (in the original series, Berta and Babs were cousins).

The musical marked the end of an era in which Walters, Imrie, and Preston appeared in nearly all of Wood's productions; Wood's biographer, Jasper Rees, later noted that "Victoria could no longer simply click her fingers and summon the gang". As Wood developed the musical, Imrie "didn't think it was a good idea and [told her] so"; Preston was supportive, but sceptical that it would come to fruition. Although Walters subsequently reprised the role of Bo Beaumont in Victoria Wood's Mid Life Christmas, neither Imrie nor Preston worked with Wood again. Preston commented of the experience, "There was an unspoken agreement that this was sort of it."

=== DVD release ===
In 2005, a performance with the original cast was filmed; it was released on DVD on 13 March 2006. Special features include featurettes which showed Victoria Wood playing the role of Mrs Overall on the nights that Julie Walters did not appear.

== Plot ==
The plot revolves around the original (fictional) actors reprising their roles from stage. Contrary to their wishes, the experimental director adapts it into a gritty commentary on British suburban life, although the cast, led by Bo Beaumont (Julie Walters), want a fun piece with a good tap number. After a disastrous open dress rehearsal, the cast hijack the concept to return it to its original roots, and take it to the West End, funded by Bo Beaumont's lottery win.

The second act is the musical within the musical, and is much more like the original series. Miss Babs (Celia Imrie) and Miss Berta (Sally Ann Triplett) run Acorn Antiques, aided by their employees and friends, Mrs Overall (Walters) and Mr Clifford (Duncan Preston). Soon, they discover a third sister, Miss Bonnie (Josie Lawrence), who is initially scheming and devious (for instance, she fires Mrs Overall, even after finding out she's her mother). The plot unfolds, the sisters are faced with financial woes, and family secrets. The show ends with the triumphant return of Mrs Overall, a windfall, and the union of Miss Berta and Mr Clifford.

== Reception ==
The musical received mixed reviews. Mark Shenton of the BBC criticised the show for extending a sketch into a three-hour-long musical, but mentioned that Julie Walters was "inimitable" and to see her "shuffling onto the stage as the perpetually stooped and crumpled Mrs Overall – tea tray in hand with macaroons at the ready – is enough to induce guffaws of recognition." Like Shenton, Philip Fisher of The British Theatre Guide lamented the record-breaking high levels of ticket price (up to £65), but lauded the performances and enthusiasm of the project. A Teletext review voiced the opinion that the plot lacked depth, and that it wasn't a great theatrical performance. The Stage said that it would have been better if Victoria Wood had drafted in aid with the musical, and also stated that it really starts at the beginning of the second act (see Revival), but that it contained "enough entertainment and wit to keep the faithful happy", and said that "the second half begins, to the palpable delight of the audience, with the show they have come to see – with missed cues, fluffed lines and preposterous plots gloriously intact". However, it played to full houses, and was nominated for Best New Musical, Best Actress in a Musical (Julie Walters) and Best Performance in a Supporting Role in a Musical (Celia Imrie) at the Laurence Olivier Awards, and won Best Supporting Performance. The original series and the musical were released on DVD in the UK in January 2005 and March 2006 respectively.

A routine from the show closed the 2005 BAFTA tribute to Victoria Wood; however, in 2007 she said that creating the musical was a "bad idea" as it harmed her credentials as a serious playwright.

== Revival ==
In early 2006 it was announced that the musical would be revived and tour the UK during the winter season. It was revealed that Victoria Wood would direct the touring production and an all-new cast will be put together, led by Ria Jones as Mrs Overall. In order to cut down on the play's lengthy running time, Wood eliminated the original first act, incorporating the number "Tip Top Tap" into an expanded second act. The tour version of the show received fairly positive reviews, with the BBC calling it "a lot of fun".

In 2010 Phil McIntyre Entertainments gave permission for the first amateur production of the musical to be performed by non-professional actors in the UK.

== Original West End cast and crew ==
Credits adapted from official website, DVD credits, and program.

=== Cast ===
- Jenna Boyd – Hatcheck Girl / Mimi
- Gareth Bryn – Steve / Hugh R Kettlewell
- Lorraine Chappell – Suzy / Papergirl / Young Mrs Overall / Evelyn
- Danielle Coombe – Sally / Miss Wellbelove / Debra
- Paul Grunert – Vic / Mr Watkins
- Shaun Henson – Ginger / Shopkeeper
- Celia Imrie – Miss Babs
- Josie Lawrence – Donna / Miss Bonnie
- Sydney Livingstone – Ken / Mr Minchin
- Jill Martin – Lynne / Christine
- Neil Morrissey – John / Tony
- Hilary O'Neil – Mavis / Bev
- Duncan Preston – Mr Clifford
- Carl Sanderson – Brian / Mr Furlong
- Myra Sands – Barbara / Miss Willoughby
- David Shaw Parker – Tom / Robert Stillman / Derek
- Nicola Sloane – Pip / Miss Cuff
- John Stacey – Alan / Postman
- Sally Ann Triplett – Miss Berta
- Julie Walters – Bo Beaumont / Mrs Overall
- Victoria Wood – Bo Beaumont / Mrs Overall (understudy)

=== Crew ===
- Lez Brotherston – Set design
- Stephen Brimson Lewis – Costume design
- Alistair Grant – Lighting design
- Paul Groothuis – Sound design
- Chris Walker – Orchestration
- Pippa Ailion – Casting director
- Gareth Valentine – Music supervisor, dance arrangements
- Stephen Mear – Choreographer
- Victoria Wood – Writer (book, music and lyrics)
- Trevor Nunn – Director

== Songs ==
=== Original production (London) ===
Because no official soundtrack has ever been released, neither has an official song list. Therefore, all songs are included in order, but most titles are unconfirmed.

Act I

- Middle Class Show – Ensemble
- Residents' Parking – Miss Babs, Mrs Overall, Miss Berta and Ensemble
- Café Continental – Mrs Overall and Ensemble
- Mine Alone (intro) – Mr Clifford
- Mine Alone – Mr Clifford, Alan, Sally
- Tip Top Tap – Mrs Overall and Ensemble
- Tip Top Tap (reprise) – Mrs Overall and Ensemble

Act II

- Manchesterford – Ensemble
- Acorn Antiques – Miss Babs, Miss Berta, Hugh, Mimi
- Macaroons! – Mrs Overall
- Please Stay Here – Miss Bonnie, Miss Babs, Miss Berta
- We're on Our Way – Miss Babs, Miss Berta, Miss Bonnie, Hugh, Mimi
- Remind Him – Miss Berta
- D.E.B.T. – Tony, Deb, Evelyn, Bev
- Manchesterford (reprise) – Mrs Overall
- Back on Top – Miss Berta, Hugh, Mimi
- I Am Going Out to Find Her – Miss Bonnie and Ensemble
- Have You Met Miss Babs? – Miss Babs
- Oh! Oh! Oh! Mrs O! – Ensemble
- Macaroons! (reprise) – Mrs Overall and Ensemble
- We're on Our Way (reprise) – Ensemble

=== Revised version (Tour) ===
Act I

- Manchesterford – Company
- Acorn Antiques – Babs, Berta, Hugh, Mimi
- Macaroons! – Mrs Overall
- Clifford's Anthem – Clifford
- Please Stay Here – Bonnie, Berta, Babs, Clifford and Ensemble
- We're on Our Way – Berta, Babs, Bonnie, Clifford, Hugh, Mimi
- Have You Met Miss Babs? – Babs
- Remind Him – Berta
- Tip Top Tap – Berta, Babs, Bonnie and Ensemble

Act II

- The Old Small Print – Tony, Deb, Evelyn, Bev, Bonnie
- Mrs Overall's Farewell – Mrs Overall
- Remind Her – Clifford
- Shagarama! – Bonnie, Berta, Babs and Ensemble
- Gents' Duet – Derek, Mr Watkins
- Once in a Lifetime – Bonnie and Ensemble
- Oh! Oh! Oh! Mrs O! – Ensemble
- Macaroons! (reprise) – Mrs Overall and Ensemble
- Finale – Ensemble

== Awards and nominations ==
Year	Award	Category	Nominee	Result
2006	Laurence Olivier Award	Best Performance in a Supporting Role in a Musical	Celia Imrie	Won
2006	Laurence Olivier Award	Best New Musical	Acorn Antiques: The Musical!	Nominated
2006	Laurence Olivier Award	Best Actress in a Musical	Julie Walters	Nominated
2006	WhatsOnStage Theatregoers' Choice Award	Best New Musical	Acorn Antiques: The Musical!	Nominated
2006	WhatsOnStage Theatregoers' Choice Award	Best Actress in a Musical	Julie Walters	Nominated
2006	WhatsOnStage Theatregoers' Choice Award	Best Supporting Actress in a Musical	Celia Imrie	Nominated
