= Victoria Wood (1989 TV series) =

1989 British TV sitcom

- Wood with Patricia Hodge and Jim Broadbent in a still from the episode 'Staying In'
- Created by: Victoria Wood
- Directed by: Kevin Bishop; Geoff Posner
- Starring: Victoria Wood; Julie Walters; Lill Roughley; Anne Reid; Philip Lowrie; Susie Blake; Celia Imrie
- Country of origin: United Kingdom
- Original language: English
- No. of series: 1
- No. of episodes: 6

Production
- Producer: Geoff Posner
- Running time: 30 minutes

Original release
- Network: BBC1
- Release: 16 November – 21 December 1989

Victoria Wood (retitled Victoria Wood Presents from 2007 for its DVD release) is a series of six one-off situation comedies written by and starring Victoria Wood in 1989, who took a break from sketches, two years after her successful sketch series Victoria Wood: As Seen on TV. Wood appeared as a fictionalised version of herself in all six episodes; she was generally identified only as "Victoria", but in the first episode was also addressed as "Miss Wood". Her real-life career was occasionally a plot point: in "The Library", it was said that she "worked in TV", and in Over To Pam characters recognised her as a comedian, though two confused her with Dawn French. Most notably, in the final episode, Staying In, she was taken to a party to perform as a stand-up comedian. Her character sometimes broke the fourth wall of TV and spoke directly to the camera, but not in every episode.

== Production ==
Bored with the sketch format and with a yearning to recapture her previous success as a playwright, Wood came up with six individual sitcoms as a compromise. She admitted to finding the writing difficult. Though Wood was written as the central character, other lead parts were written with specific actresses in mind, such as Julie Walters and Una Stubbs. She said of the characters, "I want people to like me and the people who play my friends, and not everybody else."

Unlike As Seen on TV, the show was not filmed in front of a studio audience, though the recordings were later played for an audience to record a laugh track. Wood regretted this decision as it deprived her of the "instant gratification" of an audience response, and described the filming as a "boring, diabolical and awful" experience.

== Reception ==
The series was met with a mixed critical reception. The series started out with an impressive 13 million viewers tuning in, but by the next week dropped to 11 million. The Daily Express called the show "tiresome stuff", while the Daily Mirror said Wood's targets were "predictable and snobbish". Wood later acknowledged, "It wasn't as well written by me as it could have been, and I shouldn't have been in all the sketches." In retrospect, Screenonline was more positive in its review, saying, "Modest in ambition and scale but rich in wit and acuity, the six playlets showcase Wood's eye for human foibles and her distinctively eccentric characters."

== Episode guide ==
No.	Title	Directed by	Written by	Original release date
1	"Mens Sana in Thingummy Doodah"	Kevin Bishop	Victoria Wood	16 November 1989
Victoria's friend Lill (Lill Roughley) drags her to a health farm run by a clueless manager (Julie Walters) and crude concierge (Liza Tarbuck), but Victoria's patience with the weight loss industry wears thin. Featuring: Julie Walters (Nicola); Lill Roughley (Lill); Liza Tarbuck (Dana); Meg Johnson (Connie); Anne Reid (Enid); Georgia Allen (Sallyanne); Selina Cadell (Judy); Bryan Burdon (Maintenance man); Rosalind March (Melanie Dickinson – girl on video); Peter Martin (Man in cafe).
2	"The Library"	Geoff Posner	Victoria Wood	23 November 1989
Victoria helps her friend Sheila (Anne Reid) choose her dates from a video dating service, using the local library's VCR – then tags along on the dates in case one of them turns out to be an axe murderer. Featuring: Anne Reid (Sheila); Carol MacReady (Madge – librarian); Richard Kane (John - assistant librarian); Philip Lowrie (Keith); David Henry (Richard); Danny O'Dea (Ted).
3	"Over to Pam"	Geoff Posner	Victoria Wood	30 November 1989
Victoria accompanies her hairdresser friend Lorraine (Kay Adshead) to an interview on the daytime TV hit Live with Pam. But the show's self-absorbed host, Pam Cunard (Julie Walters), gets her comeuppance when, at the last minute, Lorraine disappears and is impersonated by Victoria. Featuring: Julie Walters (Pam); Kay Adshead (Lorraine); Meg Johnson (Saundra - Console Television receptionist); Shirley Cain (Marge); Julia St. John (Caroline); Hugh Lloyd (Jim); Margery Mason (Alma); Lill Roughley (Sue); William Osborne (Neil); Charubala Chokski (Dr. Rani Najitwar); Alison King (Canteen server).
4	"We'd Quite Like to Apologise"	Kevin Bishop	Victoria Wood	7 December 1989
Victoria is looking forward to a holiday in the sun, but ends up instead hanging around an airport passenger lounge with her fellow passengers waiting for their delayed plane to arrive. Featuring: Julie Walters (Joyanne); Una Stubbs (Una); Lill Roughley (Barbara); Philip Lowrie (John); Jane Horrocks (Kathy); Celia Imrie (Carol - SunSeaKing rep); Tristram Wymark (Guy); Susie Blake (Girl at check-in desk); Rosalind March (Woman in car); Valerie Minifie (Woman in lift); Peter Martin (Man on travelator); Joe Fraser (Spanish waiter); Rory Bremner (Radio voices), David Jacobs (Voice of David Jacobs), Duncan Preston (Voice of Captain Lewis), Graham Seed (Other radio voices).
5	"Val de Ree (Ha Ha Ha Ha Ha)"	Kevin Bishop	Victoria Wood	14 December 1989
Victoria and her friend Jackie (Celia Imrie) go off on a walking and camping holiday across the Yorkshire Dales, but find they are unable to erect their tent and have trouble finding somewhere to sleep. There's only one way for Victoria and Jackie to get into the hostel run by the haughty and slightly mad Susan (Joan Sims): pretending to be the survivalist lecturers expected to give a talk that evening. Featuring: Celia Imrie (Jackie); Siân Thomas (Girl on farm); Michael Lumsden (Jamie); Avril Angers (Mim); Michael Nightingale (Daddy); Joan Sims (Susan).
6	"Staying In"	Geoff Posner	Victoria Wood	21 December 1989
Victoria wants to stay in for the night and watch television, but receives a telephone call from her stuck-up friend Jane (Deborah Grant), who drags her along to a posh London dinner party hosted by Moira (Patricia Hodge). Featuring: Patricia Hodge (Moira); Deborah Grant (Jane); Phyllis Calvert (Hilary); Lill Roughley (Dulcie); Roger Brierley (Gerald); John Nettleton (Charles); Jim Broadbent (Alan); Bryan Burdon (Jim); Celia Imrie (Woman on TV/Julia/TV soundtrack female voice); Susie Blake (Judith); Richard Lintern (Kevin); Dawn Archibald (Ailsa); Susan Leong (Filipino waitress); Peter Goodwright (TV soundtrack male voices).

== Home media ==
=== VHS and DVDs ===
Format	Title	Release date	Label	Notes
VHS	Mens Sana in Thingummy Doodah	7 September 1992	BBC Video	Also includes the episodes The Library and Over to Pam.
VHS	We'd Quite Like to Apologise	1993	BBC Video	Also includes the episodes Val de Ree (Ha Ha Ha Ha Ha) and Staying In.
DVD	Victoria Wood Presents	21 May 2007	2 Entertain	Retitled. Includes all 6 episodes.
DVD	Victoria Wood Presents	18 October 2010	2 Entertain	Includes all 6 episodes on one disc, part of the 7-disc box set The Victoria Wood Collection.
DVD	Victoria Wood Presents	17 October 2016	2 Entertain	Includes all 6 episodes on one disc, part of the re-release of the 7-disc box set The Victoria Wood Collection.

=== Script collection ===
Front cover of Mens Sana in Thingummy Doodah (Methuen, 1991).

On 13 September 1990, the scripts of all six shows were published by Methuen London as Mens Sana in Thingummy Doodah, and Other Nuggets of Homely Fun. The book is dedicated "To all the Old Bags in Equity, most of whom were in the series". The book contains a preface by Wood about what it's like to make a TV programme:

Once the Writer has finished writing, she takes the 'scripts' to the BBC where a seventeen-year-old Secretary spills coffee on them and leaves them behind the photocopier. When the Secretary leaves the BBC to become a full-time sunbather it can sometimes be a jolly long time before those 'scripts' come to light! And sometimes when they do they have been hidden for such a long time they have become 'dated' and 'unrealistic'. But fortunately, the BBC will still make them into 'programmes'.
