= Roger Brierley =

British actor (1935–2005)

- Brierley in Casualty (1987)
- Born: David Roger Brierley; 2 June 1935; Stockport, Cheshire, England
- Died: 23 September 2005 (aged 70); Westminster, London, England
- Partner(s): Gillian McCutcheon (?–1996); Joan Jones (2001–2005)
- Children: 1

David Roger Brierley (2 June 1935 – 23 September 2005) was an English actor. He appeared in dozens of television productions over a forty-year period.

== Career ==
Brierley twice appeared in Doctor Who, as Trevor in The Daleks' Master Plan (1965) and as the voice of Drathro in The Mysterious Planet (1986).

Brierley appeared in the biopic Jinnah based on the life of Muhammad Ali Jinnah, in The Fall and Rise of Reginald Perrin (1976) as Mr. Thoneycroft in episode 6, and in the Granada television series Jeeves and Wooster as Sir Roderick Glossop.

Brierley played the part of "Ozzy" Osborne in the 1977 episode "Suddenly At Home" in the TV series Rising Damp. He was also in an Only Fools and Horses episode in 1982 ("Diamonds Are for Heather").

Brierley portrayed Michael Palin's Latin teacher in a 1979 episode of Ripping Yarns entitled Roger of the Raj. In 1987 he played Reverend Phelps in East of Ipswich, also written by Palin. In 1988 he appeared with Palin and John Cleese in A Fish Called Wanda as Archie Leach's secretary, Davidson.

Brierley worked on several occasions with Victoria Wood such as in her play Nearly a Happy Ending, in the early series Wood and Walters and her 1994 TV film Pat and Margaret. In a nod to her previous work with Brierley, Wood named a character after him in her 2006 television film Housewife, 49.

Brierley's later work also included portraying John Biffen in the TV dramatisation of The Alan Clark Diaries (2004). He also played the hotel manager in "Mr. Bean in Room 426".

== Personal life and death ==
Brierley was a supporter of Manchester United and was a founding member of Shareholders United Against Murdoch.

Brierley died of a heart attack on 23 September 2005.

== Selected filmography ==
=== Film ===
Year	Title	Role	Notes
1980	Superman II	Terrorist #1	
1983	The Wicked Lady	Clergyman at Tyburn	
1985	Young Sherlock Holmes	Mr. Holmes	
1987	East of Ipswich	Reverend Phelps	
1988	A Fish Called Wanda	Davidson	
1990	Killing Dad or How to Love Your Mother	Hotel Manager	
1994	A Business Affair	Barrister	
1996	Beaumarchais	Printer	
1998	Monk Dawson	Fr Francis	
1998	Jinnah	Judge	
2000	The Calling	Reverend	
2001	Bodywork	District judge	
2002	Ali G Indahouse	Town Hall Official	
2002	About a Boy	Mr. Chalmers, the M.C.	

=== Television ===
Year	Title	Role	Notes
1965	The Likely Lads	Julian	Episode: "Last of the Big Spenders"
1969	Hadleigh	Billy Hedford	Episode: "M.Y.O.B."
1970	His and Hers	Constable	Episode: "Crime"
1971	Kindly Leave the Kerb		Episode: "The Collection"
1969–1975	Z Cars	Francis Headmaster	2 episodes
1975	Out of the Trees	Various	Pilot
1976	The Sweeney	Psychiatrist	Episode: "On The Run"
1976	Coronation Street	Lanky Potts	3 episodes
1977	Rising Damp	Osborne	Episode: "Suddenly at Home"
1974–1978	Crown Court	Roy White PC Lakin	3 episodes
1979	Telford's Change	Reverend John Kenton	3 episodes
1979	Kids	Dr. Benton	3 episodes
1980	The Goodies	Park Attendant	Episode: "U-Friend or UFO?"
1982	Only Fools and Horses	Brian	Episode: "Diamonds Are for Heather"
1983	Mr. Right	Bank manager	4 episodes
1982–1984	Shine on Harvey Moon	Mr. Compton	6 episodes
1966–1986	Doctor Who	Drathro (voice) Trevor	5 episodes
1987	Screen Two	Reverend Phelps	Episode: "East of Ipswich"
1988	A Very British Coup	Thomas Andrews MP	2 episodes
1987–1989	Ffizz	Rawlins	3 episodes
1989	First of the Summer Wine	Uncle Fred	Episode: "Quiet Wedding"
1990	All Creatures Great and Small	Major Wakeman	Episode: "Brotherly Love: Christmas Special"
1990–1991	Jeeves and Wooster	Sir Roderick Glossop	3 episodes
1991	Bottom	Sir Roger Cobham	"Apocalypse"
1982–1991	Minder	Cyril Donald	2 episodes
1979–1992	Rumpole of the Bailey	Mr. Cursitor Roach	2 episodes
1993	Mr. Bean	Hotel Manager	Episode: "Mr. Bean in Room 426"
1989–1994	Screen One	Hotel Manager Air Vice-Marshall Julian Brind	3 episodes
1995	Surgical Spirit	Professor of dentistry	Series 7 Episode 6: Kicking against the pricks
2000	Innocents	Dr. John Roylance	Television film
2001	London's Burning	Vicar	Episode: #13.11
