= Victoria Wood's All Day Breakfast =

1992 British television comedy programme

- Genre: Comedy
- Written by: Victoria Wood
- Starring: Victoria Wood; Julie Walters; Celia Imrie; Susie Blake; Duncan Preston; Lill Roughley
- Country of origin: United Kingdom
- No. of episodes: 1

Production
- Producer: Geoff Posner
- Running time: 50 minutes

Original release
- Network: BBC One
- Release: 25 December 1992

Related
- Victoria Wood As Seen on TV

Victoria Wood's All Day Breakfast is a 50-minute television comedy special, written by and starring comedian Victoria Wood. It was broadcast on BBC One on Christmas Day 1992.

The show was largely a parody of British daytime TV. The sketches were linked by Duncan Preston and Wood as husband-and-wife presenters Martin Cumbernauld and Sally Crossthwaite, parodying the real husband-and-wife presenting team Richard Madeley and Judy Finnigan and their daytime magazine show, This Morning. Wood found the pair "unintentionally funny" and was particularly amused by the prospect of "sitting next to your husband and having to be nice to him". She claimed that Madeley and Finnigan had told her they loved the parody.

== Cast ==
- Victoria Wood – Herself / Sally Crossthwaite / Various characters
- Julie Walters – Various characters
- Celia Imrie – Various characters
- Susie Blake – Various characters
- Duncan Preston – Martin Cumbernauld / Various characters
- Lill Roughley – Various characters
- Geraldine Alexander – Mrs Beech (Patient's wife)
- Shirley Cain – Nurse
- Richard Lintern – Sean
- Philip Lowrie – Various characters
- William Osborne – Pierre
- Sara Powell – Medical secretary
- Nicholas Pritchard – Mr Beech (Patient)
- Gillian Tompkins – Jackie
- Alan Rickman – Himself
