= The Summer Show =

The Summer Show is a British comedy sketch show made in 1975. It featured winners of the ATV talent show New Faces, and was made by ATV for the ITV network

Designed to emulate the fast moving style of Rowan and Martin's Laugh-In, it featured Charlie James, Marti Caine, Lenny Henry, Victoria Wood, Aiden J Harvey and singer Trevor Chance. To help out with the first show was the more experienced TV personality Leslie Crowther.

The Summer Show consisted of five, forty-five-minute specials on the subjects of "holidays", "health and strength","mystery and crime","kids", and "entertainment".

The performers, who were paid £175 a week for their efforts (a pay increase for Wood and a pay cut for Caine), were encouraged to diversify. Thus it featured the unlikely sight of Wood and Crowther duetting and other thrown-together combinations for songs, sketches and dances.

Wood said of the experience "it was one of those really bad variety shows where they got the scripts out of other people's dustbins. It was just dreadful." She was told by costumers, who said she was too big for the costumes, "if only you'd lose two stone you could wear this of Anna Massey's."

Wood immediately went back to the unemployment queue when it ended, whereas the series was a springboard for other cast members; Caine got her own TV series and Henry joined The Black and White Minstrel Show.

== Archive status ==
Like so many shows of its time, The Summer Show is completely missing from the television archives.
