= Bring Me Morecambe & Wise =

- Narrated by: Victoria Wood
- Country of origin: United Kingdom
- Original language: English
- No. of series: 1
- No. of episodes: 5 (list of episodes)

Production
- Running time: 60 minutes

Original release
- Network: Gold
- Release: 21 November – 19 December 2012

Bring Me Morecambe & Wise is a five-part television documentary series that goes behind the scenes of one of Morecambe and Wise acts. The series was first shown on UK television station Gold in November 2012. The first of five sixty minute shows aired on 21 November 2012.

In the series, people close to the duo are interviewed about their shared experiences during the 1970s and 1980s. The series also showcases never-before-seen sketches and routines from the double act and clips from some of their earliest TV performances, as well as an interview with Eric Morecambe's wife Joan.

== Episode list ==
No.	Title	Original release date
1	"From Stage to Screen"	21 November 2012
2	"The Guest Stars"	28 November 2012
3	"At Home with Eric and Ern"	5 December 2012
4	"The Plays Wot Ernie Wrote"	12 December 2012
5	"Christmas"	19 December 2012
