= Talent (play) =

The script for Talent, published by Methuen in 1988.

Talent is a play written by Victoria Wood, first performed in 1978. It centres on two friends, one of whom is about to enter a talent contest in a run down nightclub. Commissioned for the Crucible Theatre, Sheffield, it received much acclaim and transferred to a London run in 1979. That same year a television adaptation was broadcast. It was the first time Victoria Wood and Julie Walters appeared together on TV.

A mixture of dialogue and music, one of its tunes inspired The Smiths song Rusholme Ruffians. The script was published by Methuen in 1988, along with another play by Wood, Good Fun.

== Origins ==
After receiving much acclaim for her writing and performance in a 1978 revue at The Bush Theatre titled In at the Death, Wood was commissioned by then theatre director David Leland to write a play for Sheffield's Crucible Theatre.

The initial commission was for Wood to co-write, with fellow revue writer Ron Hutchinson, a play about strippers. According to Wood: "The Bush Theatre was over a pub which had strippers and Ron and I spent twenty minutes one evening watching a large girl in boots walk out of the ladies' lavatory, take off her clothes (she kept on her boots, the floor was filthy) and walk back into the ladies lavatory again. Then Ron said he was too busy to do this play, and David asked me if I would do it on my own. Not knowing anything about the world of the stripper and having all the investigative zeal of a defrosting beefburger, I decided to try and write up an idea of my own. The idea came quite easily, though typing it out was quite difficult."

Wood gained the idea for a play set around talent contests, based on her own experiences entering them (she had won ATV's New Faces three years earlier). She said: "I had always been fascinated by talent contests and had entered quite a few in my late teens and early twenties. I never won, though in a Birmingham nightclub I once came third on the clap-o-meter... I was also interested in the relationship between attractive sparky girls and big fat plain ones."

== Plot ==
Talent centres around two friends, the plain, overweight Maureen, and her more glamorous friend Julie Stephens, who has entered a talent contest. According to Screenonline:

"Julie is one of the hopefuls - a 24-year-old secretary and young mum caught between her youthful dreams of showbiz glamour and the realisation of her more likely future: soul-crushing domesticity and drudgery with upwardly mobile boyfriend Dave. With her for support is the awkward, frumpy Maureen, long in the shadow of her slimmer, better-looking friend.

But Bunters nightclub holds few prospects for Julie - just a grotty dressing room, a surprise encounter with Mel, the flash, sportscar-driving boyfriend who abandoned her as a pregnant schoolgirl eight years ago, and the unwelcome attentions of the oily compere, who precedes his seduction by telling her, "you have got a mediocre voice, a terrible Lancashire accent, no experience and no act," before enticing her with the promise of a spot on the Des O'Connor Show (moments later, he is groping a bemused Maureen and offering her twenty minutes in the back of his white Cortina)."

== Stage version ==
The play was first performed at the Crucible Theatre in Sheffield in September 1978. It was directed by David Leland. The cast was Hazel Clyne (Julie), Victoria Wood (Maureen), Roger Sloman (George Findlay), Bill Stewart (Arthur Hall), Eric Richard (Mel), Peter Ellis (Compere). Wood also went to the side of the stage to play piano to accompany the songs in the show. She said: "I think that worked better than having a band. I have never seen it done since in the way that we did it. I suppose because fat actresses who can double as musical director are thin on the ground (or fat on the ground)."

She later claimed that she had not intended to be in the show at all, "though everyone assumed I had written it with the express purpose of drinking Babycham and having my bosoms fondled nightly."

The show had a London Transfer to the ICA, beginning on 31 January 1979, with Bill Stewart and Peter Ellis being replaced by David Ellson and Jim Broadbent.

The show had a London fringe revival in 2008 at 'Upstairs at the Gatehouse'. The cast was Vikki Stone (Maureen), Stephanie Briggs (Julie), Harry Dickman (George Findlay), John Walters (Arthur Hall) and Charlie Carter (Mel/The Compere).

In September 2009 a revival began at the Menier Chocolate Factory in London, also directed by Victoria Wood.

The play was revived in 2021, at the Sheffield Crucible (this time on the main stage), in a production directed by Paul Foster and with Lucie Shorthouse as Julie and Jamie-Rose Monk as Maureen.

== Television version ==
Talent
- Genre: Comedy
- Created by: Victoria Wood
- Directed by: Baz Taylor
- Starring: Victoria Wood; Julie Walters; Bill Waddington; Kevin Lloyd; Peter Ellis
- Country of origin: United Kingdom
- No. of series: 1
- No. of episodes: 1

Production
- Producer: Peter Eckersley
- Running time: 75 minutes

Original release
- Network: ITV
- Release: 5 August 1979

Granada Television producer Peter Eckersley was so impressed with the show, he signed Wood for a television adaptation of it which was broadcast on the ITV network on 5 August 1979. Wood had originally written the part of Julie for her co-star in In at the Death, Julie Walters, and while she was not available for the stage version, she was able to appear in the TV remake. It was the first of many television appearances the two would make together.

The rest of the cast were Bill Waddington (George Findley), Kevin Lloyd (Mel), Nat Jackley (Arthur), Sue Glover (Cathy Christmas), Peter Ellis (Compere), Andrew Dodge (Cathy's accompanist).

The television critics were unanimous in their praise, and Wood received congratulatory letters from actor John Le Mesurier and fellow northern writer Alan Plater. It even led to an offer for Wood to join the then new satirical comedy show Not The Nine O'Clock News, which she turned down.

A year later, a television-only sequel to Talent called Nearly A Happy Ending was broadcast on Granada, again written by Wood and starring Wood and Walters reprising their roles.

== The Smiths ==
A song from the show, "Fourteen Again", had its lyrics adapted for another tune, "Rusholme Ruffians" by the eighties pop group The Smiths. Its lead singer Morrissey was a fan of Wood's, and had even proposed marriage to her via the music press (to which she responded "Morrissey and I have been married for 11 months, though due to touring commitments, we have yet to meet.") According to the band's biographer Johnny Rogan "He paid her the ultimate 'compliment' by hijacking her song 'Fourteen Again' and transforming its sardonic nostalgia into a lacerating satire on mind-numbing proletarial leisure. In Morrissey's landscape, the fairground in the original song becomes a carnival of violence tinged with bitter romance...It is fascinating to observe Wood's characteristic self-effacing, but affectionate, adolescent recollections juxtaposed to Morrissey's almost cinematic melanchony. They both share an appealing laconic style and dour wit, but Morrissey's world view is more threatening, pessimistic and painful."

== Song list ==
- Julie
- I Don't Know Why I'm Here
- Fourteen Again
- Pals
- He Wouldn't Remember Me
- Bored With This
