= Pat and Margaret =

1994 British drama telefilm

- Opening title
- Genre: Comedy drama
- Written by: Victoria Wood
- Directed by: Gavin Millar
- Starring: Victoria Wood; Julie Walters; Celia Imrie; Deborah Grant; Duncan Preston; Thora Hird; Shirley Stelfox; Anne Reid
- Ending theme: "Magic Moments"
- Composer: Colin Towns
- Country of origin: United Kingdom
- Original language: English

Production
- Producer: Ruth Caleb
- Cinematography: John Daly
- Editor: Ken Pearce
- Running time: 84 minutes
- Production company: BBC

Original release
- Network: BBC One
- Release: 11 September 1994

Pat and Margaret is a British television film written by comedian Victoria Wood. The story follows sisters Margaret, a cook, and Pat, a successful actress in the United States, after they are reunited on a television programme after spending 27 years apart. It stars Wood and her frequent comedy partner Julie Walters in the title roles, and features other past collaborators of Wood, including Thora Hird, Celia Imrie and Duncan Preston. First aired in 1994 on BBC One, the film was directed by Gavin Millar and produced by Ruth Caleb.

After gaining over 10 million viewers, it won a Broadcasting Press Guild award and was nominated for two BAFTA awards. It drew comparisons with northern English dramatist Alan Bennett for its complex characterisation and observational dialogue.

== Plot ==
Margaret Mottershead works as a cook at a motorway service area. She joins her colleagues on a trip to London, where they have been invited to see a recording of the television show Magic Moments (a parody of Surprise, Surprise). Pat Bedford, the glamorous British star of an American soap opera, appears on the show to promote her memoir, unaware that she herself is one of the surprises. The host brings Margaret on stage and reveals that Pat is her long-lost sister. Pat is embarrassed by her working class Northern origins, but hugs Margaret and feigns happiness in order to appear gracious and likeable.

Unaware of Pat's true feelings, her assistant, Claire, arranges for Margaret to stay with Pat at her luxury hotel. The next morning, a film crew from Magic Moments arrives to follow the pair getting to know each other, and Pat resigns herself to staged bonding for the cameras. Margaret phones her boyfriend, Jim, to tell him that she will return home shortly, but his disapproving mother does not pass on the message.

Pat tries to pay off Margaret to deny that they are related, but only succeeds in angering her. Meanwhile, tabloid journalist Stella Kincaid discovers a woman she believes to be their mother, Vera, in a nursing home in their home town. Pat and Margaret recall how horrible their mother was, and Margaret agrees to help Pat. The two head north, hoping to stop Vera talking to the press. However, they find that the woman in the nursing home is not their mother. Jim, believing Margaret has dumped him, goes to London to find her. He meets Claire, and the two follow Pat and Margaret back north.

Stella learns that Pat had a child at the age of fifteen and hears rumours that Vera was a prostitute. She finds the real Vera, and after seeing photographs of her realises she is linked to another story: a timeshare scandal. While hiding from Stella at a petrol station, Pat is accidentally hosed down with water, leaving her soaking wet. Having left all her luggage, credit cards, and identification in London, Pat has to borrow money from Margaret to buy a cheap tracksuit. To add to her humiliation, she is unable to book into a hotel due to her lack of funds and cheap clothing.

Margaret takes Pat to her bedsit, where she tells Pat that after she left home, Vera was sent to prison and Margaret was placed in foster care. Pat reveals that in fact, Vera threw her out because she was pregnant. Jim arrives with Pat's bag, but when he is more interested in returning home to his mother than meeting Pat, an irritated Margaret ends their relationship. Pat takes Margaret to the café where she worked as a teenager, which is still owned by her old boss, now planning to retire. Claire joins them for dinner, where she gives Pat "a note from a fan", which appears to be from Vera, asking to meet, but in fact was written by Stella.

Pat and Margaret are stunned to find their mother is now wealthy after winning at gambling. Vera assumes Margaret wants money; Pat angrily tells Vera she owes them for their unhappy childhood. Vera points out that following Pat's own success, she could have sought out Margaret and given her a better life, forcing Pat to admit she is hard and selfish like her mother. Vera claims that she drove Pat to make a success of her life, and tells her daughters that she has to sell her luxurious house because of the timeshare scandal. Stella appears with her photographer and tells the sisters that Vera has given her an exclusive. She further threatens to trace Pat's child, but Pat in turn reveals that her son found her many years before and has no interest in being involved with the media. Margaret defends Pat, arguing that she should be applauded, rather than derided, for beating the odds; Stella offers to make the story sympathetic to the women if all three give her an exclusive, to which Pat and Margaret reluctantly agree.

Margaret and Jim make up when he decides to leave his mother and move in with Margaret. Margaret declines Pat's offer to move to the United States with her. In a surprise move, Pat takes Vera instead, as "they're very big at the moment, celebrities' mums". Pat leaves Margaret a goodbye letter with a set of keys to the café, which she has bought for Margaret and Jim.

== Cast ==
- Victoria Wood as Margaret Mottershead
- Julie Walters as Pat Bedford
- Celia Imrie as Claire
- Duncan Preston as Jim
- Deborah Grant as Stella
- Thora Hird as Jim's mother
- Shirley Stelfox as Vera Mottershead
- Anne Reid as Maeve
- Julie Hesmondhalgh as Carer
- Philip Lowrie as Martin
- Don Henderson as Billy
- Lynda Rooke as Bella
- Madge Hindle as Hotel Lady
- Robert Kingswell as Pete

== Production ==
The film was created and written by Wood, whose last full-length drama was Happy Since I Met You in 1981. It was directed by Gavin Millar, recommended to Wood by Julie Walters, and produced by Ruth Caleb. Wood was accustomed to a level of control over the direction of her scripts, which led to frustration with Millar, who at one point told her, "Go away [and] let me do it", and on another occasion reminded Anne Reid, "[Victoria's] not directing this; I'm directing this." Nevertheless, Wood liked and admired Millar, and acknowledged that she had a "nosy, critical, interfering side".

An early draft of the script was rejected by LWT, who told Wood, "A film is not a sketch, you know." The script underwent significant changes between the second and third drafts, as Wood worked in material "possibly suggested by [her] sessions of therapy", such as her own issues stemming from maternal abandonment, assisted by script editor Robyn Slovo. The third draft also reworked the character of Claire as Celia Imrie had become pregnant, and added the running gag of Pat's malapropisms.

In 2010, the film was adapted as a 90-minute radio drama, starring Sarah Lancashire as Margaret and Tracy-Ann Oberman as Pat. The cast also included Wood's frequent collaborators Imelda Staunton, Thelma Barlow, and Philip Lowrie. It aired on BBC Radio 4 as a Christmas Day special.

=== Filming locations ===
- Motorway services – Heston services on the M4
- Peacock Productions studios – BBC Elstree Centre
- Sanctuary Spa, Covent Garden
- Margaret's flat – Grafton Road, Acton
- Jim's mother's house – 65 Oozehead Lane, Blackburn
- Pat and Margaret's childhood home – Woodlea Road, Blackburn
- Vera's house – Longacre, Billinge End Road, Blackburn
- The Swiss Cottage Cafe – The Green, Darwen

== Reception ==
The film was watched by more than 10 million viewers.

After going on location during filming, James Rampton for The Independent wrote that the film "contains many lines of vintage Victoria...And – judging from the script – the film is not a three-minute idea tortuously spun out over 90, but a living, breathing feature, with characters rather than caricatures and pathos rather than punchlines." For Screenonline, Mark Duguid wrote the drama is Wood's "most ambitious, rounded and mature work to date" and describes it as "rapturously received". On Wood's comparisons with Alan Bennett, he says that she "certainly shares Bennett's gift for characterisation and his ear for comic but natural dialogue". The Daily Telegraph's Judith Woods described Victoria Wood: As Seen on TV, Dinnerladies and Acorn Antiques as "character-led television gems".

The film won the Broadcasting Press Guild Award for best single drama, and the best actress and best screenplay awards at the Reims Television Festival. The drama was also nominated for two British Academy Television Awards in 1994: Best Single Drama, and Best Actress for Wood.
