= Peter Eckersley (TV producer) =

British television producer

- Born: 7 April 1936; Leigh, Lancashire, England
- Died: 27 August 1981 (aged 45); Manchester, England
- Occupation: television producer
- Years active: 1960–1981
- Spouses: Eileen Wilson (m. 1958; div. 1971) Anne Reid (m. 1971)
- Children: 2

Peter Eckersley (7 April 1936 – 27 August 1981) was a British television producer. His television career began on Granada's Scene at 6.30 magazine programme, where Eckersley worked with his friend Michael Parkinson. Eckersley went on to become Head of Drama at Granada Television in the 1960s and 1970s.

== Career ==
In the 1960s, he was also a writer and producer on Coronation Street. He wrote 62 episodes between April 1962 and November 1969. There he met and married one of its stars, Anne Reid, who played Valerie Barlow.

He also produced the sitcom Nearest and Dearest with Hylda Baker and Jimmy Jewel.

During the late 1970s, Eckersley spotted and developed a young comedian Victoria Wood, who went on to become one of the UK's most successful comedy stars. He produced the TV version of her play Talent and its sequel Nearly A Happy Ending, as well as the play Happy Since I Met You (also by Wood). He also produced the pilot of Wood and Walters, but died before the series was made. Wood cited him as her biggest influence.

== Death ==
He died aged 45 in 1981, after suffering from cancer for two years.

== Legacy ==
David Liddiment, ITV's former director of programmes said: "Peter Eckersley nurtured a new cadre of young northern writers who reflected the realities of post-war urban life for the first time....They were all to make television drama younger, sharper and closer to the experience of the mass audience."
