= Victoria Wood with All the Trimmings =

2000 British television comedy sketch programme

- DVD cover
- Genre: Comedy
- Created by: Victoria Wood
- Starring: Victoria Wood; Julie Walters; Celia Imrie; Anne Reid; Maxine Peake; Shobna Gulati
- Country of origin: United Kingdom
- Original language: English

Production
- Producer: Geoff Posner
- Running time: 55 minutes

Original release
- Network: BBC One
- Release: 25 December 2000

Victoria Wood with All the Trimmings is a one-off Christmas comedy sketch-show special, written by and starring comedian Victoria Wood. It was first broadcast on BBC One on Christmas Day 2000. The cast included Wood's frequent co-stars Celia Imrie, Julie Walters and Anne Reid as well as her Dinnerladies co-stars Maxine Peake and Shobna Gulati. In addition Wood's children also had cameos in the programme.

== Production ==
The show was described by a BBC News Online writer in 2000 as "the centrepiece of BBC One's Christmas Day schedules". Wood responded, "it's a very strange feeling—but it's got to be someone, hasn't it?" The show was made straight after Wood had finished work on her sitcom Dinnerladies. She said, "I was worn out from doing dinnerladies and it took me a long time to recover. It was great to do but it was very draining...the last 10 Dinnerladies I did in a really, really short time and I was ill at one point. This Christmas special was much easier to write because it was in bits."

In addition to Wood's regular collaborators, the special featured a large number of guest and celebrity appearances, including Caroline Aherne, Susie Blake, James Bolam, Betty Boothroyd, June Brown, Craig Cash, Roger Cook, Lindsay Duncan, Hannah Gordon, Richard E. Grant, Philip Jackson, Derek Jacobi, Hugh Laurie, Robert Lindsay, Geraldine McEwan, Bob Monkhouse, Roger Moore, Michael Parkinson, Bill Paterson, Billie Piper, Pete Postlethwaite, Alan Rickman, Angela Rippon, Kate Robbins, Ted Robbins, Delia Smith, Kathy Staff, Imelda Staunton, Alan Titchmarsh, Ian "H" Watkins, Honeysuckle Weeks, Penelope Wilton, Anna Wing and Bernard Wrigley. Wood said of the casting, "I had a great long list of all the people I really liked. I wrote to the first 14 or so—and they all said yes. So I thought, 'Oh, bloody hell—I've got to write it now.'"

Wood asked Ann Widdecombe, then the Shadow Home Secretary, for permission to parody her in the show's finale musical number, which Widdecombe, consenting, described as "ultra considerate".

== Summary ==
In a cold open parodying the James Bond films, Wood's character meets Roger Moore on the London Eye, where he hires her to assassinate Pierce Brosnan. The special's frame story then begins as Wood arrives at a community hall to begin rehearsals for the special, and is accosted by a BBC employee (Celia Imrie) and cameraperson filming a making-of special for "the new digital channel BBC Backstage". Wood soon realises that even the toilet has cameras to film behind-the-scenes footage.

Upon arriving in her rehearsal space, Wood meets John Malkovich (Hugh Laurie), the head of the BBC's digital channels, which include BBC Backstage, BBC Upmarket, BBC Downmarket, BBC Newmarket (a racing channel), BBC Makeover, BBC Takeover (a business channel), and BBC Good Old Days. Imrie's character explains the BBC has also launched "new mini-dig viewer's choice micro-channels: Wartime, Daytime, Teatime, Braindead, and Knitwear".

Maxine Peake and Shobna Gulati join Wood for rehearsals, and Gulati invites an exercise group and children's choir to share their rehearsal space, to Wood's annoyance. Another BBC administrator, the Head of Christmas Decisions (Richenda Carey), arrives, while John is promoted to Head of All-Weather Outdoor Seating. Wood allows a "'70s right-wing comedians rehab group" to meet in the rehearsal space, reasoning that "everyone else is". Wood and Carey's character continue planning the special, but their plan to film outside meets an obstacle as John is again moved to be Assistant Head of Tea Bar Purchasing.

In the toilet, Wood speaks directly to the camera to say that she's lost the motivation to do a big finale for the special, as the BBC is demanding a celebration of "the traditional family Christmas", which Wood doesn't understand. Carey's character then summarises her demands for the special's finale, which include that it be "Christmassy but in a non-denominational way, to have a slight political leaning to the right, ... to provide a platform for presenting a positive image of larger women", and to feature four robins, leading Wood to sarcastically suggest "Ann Widdecombe on ice". Meanwhile, a brass band has also taken up residence in the rehearsal room.

Wood steps outside and meets Kate, Ted, Emma, and Amy Robbins. She realises they will fulfil the mandate for "four robins", but another personnel shake-up has left Peake in charge of the entire BBC. Peake is unconcerned about the content of the finale, but Wood nevertheless presents the idea she's formulated, in which the children's choir, exercise group, Robbins siblings, comedians in rehab, and brass band join her to perform a song celebrating Widdecombe (played by Wood herself) as a symbol of Christmas.

The frame story is frequently interrupted by sketches, most of them illustrating the new speciality channels mentioned by Laurie's and Imrie's characters:

- BBC One airs a parody of A Christmas Carol starring Derek Jacobi as Ebenezer Scrooge.
- BBC Upmarket airs Brassed Up, a film in which a weaving factory's brass band is saved from closure by a local woman (Wood), who nonetheless is not allowed to join the men-only band, in a parody of the film Brassed Off.
- BBC Wartime airs a newsreel from World War II showing two Cockney women (Wood and Julie Walters) who cheerfully discuss their Christmas plans after being bombed in a blitz on Christmas Eve.
- BBC Knitwear airs WI, an ER parody about the Women's Institute starring Wood, Richard E. Grant, Jacobi, and Lindsay Duncan.
- BBC Teatime airs a black-and-white short film titled "Brief Encounter", a parody of the film of the same name, about a woman (Wood) who falls in love over the course of an afternoon with a man who helps her after she gets a piece of mince pie stuck in her eye.
- BBC Braindead airs a reality show starring cruise ship singer Stacy Leeanne Page (Wood), a parody of Jane McDonald, followed by Hannah Gordon's Celebrity Painting-by-Numbers.
- BBC Good Old Days airs an old episode of the Billy Cotton Band Show featuring Hillary and Valerie Mallory (Wood and Anne Reid), sisters who play a piano duet amid a spat and Valerie's body odor.
- BBC Upmarket also airs Plots & Proposals, a Regency era costume drama with an ensemble cast including Alan Rickman as a captain at the Battle of Waterloo. The film breaks off midway through, demanding payment from the viewer to see the second half. It parodies programmes such as Pride and Prejudice and Lark Rise to Candleford.
