= Victoria's Empire =

Television series

- Country of origin: United Kingdom
- Original language: English

Production
- Running time: 58 minutes
- Production company: Tiger Aspect Productions

Victoria's Empire is a three-part British travel series that was first broadcast on BBC One in 2007. It was written and presented by comedian and actress Victoria Wood. Wood travelled around the world in search of the history, cultural impact and customs which the British Empire placed on the parts of the world it ruled. The documentary was called Victoria's Empire after the presenter, as Wood herself is named after the ruler of the British Empire, Queen Victoria. Wood specifically looked at places named after the monarch.

== Programs ==
In total Wood visited nine countries:

She departed from London Victoria station for:

- Program One: Calcutta (India), Hong Kong and Borneo
- Program Two: Ghana, Jamaica and Newfoundland, Canada
- Program Three: New Zealand, Australia and Zambia, finishing at the Victoria Falls (a waterfall on the Zambezi River in South Africa)

== Publication ==
A tie-in publication book, also called Victoria's Empire (ISBN 978-0340938010) was released in both hardback and paperback editions to accompany the series in the same year.
