= Philip Lowrie =

English actor (1936–2025)

- Lowrie as Dennis Tanner in Coronation Street
- Born: Colin Philip Lowrie; 20 June 1936; Ashton-under-Lyne, Lancashire, England
- Died: 25 April 2025 (aged 88)
- Occupation: Actor
- Years active: 1958–2019
- Known for: Role of Dennis Tanner in Coronation Street (1960–1968, 2011–2014)

Colin Philip Lowrie (20 June 1936 – 25 April 2025) was an English stage and television actor. He played Dennis Tanner in the long-running ITV soap opera Coronation Street from its inception in 1960 until 1968 and again from 2011 until 2014.

== Life and career ==
=== Early life ===
Born in Ashton-under-Lyne, Lancashire on 20 June 1936, Lowrie was the son of Bertha (née Collins) and Philip Lowrie, who was a foreman in a paper mill. Lowrie had a stammer so attended elocution lessons at Miss Atherton's Elocution. When he left secondary school, his mother managed to save enough money to pay his fees at the Royal Academy of Dramatic Art in London, where he studied for three years.

=== Career ===
Aged 24, Lowrie appeared in the opening episode of the Granada Television soap opera Coronation Street as Dennis Tanner, the son of Elsie Tanner (Pat Phoenix) and brother of Linda Cheveski (Anne Cunningham). Lowrie remained with the show as a regular character until 1968. During this period, he recorded a pop single, "I Might Have Known", which was issued by Ember in September 1963. Despite being recorded at the prestigious Abbey Road Studios and produced by John Barry, the record was not a hit.

Lowrie worked with Victoria Wood on several occasions, appearing in her programmes Victoria Wood's All Day Breakfast and Victoria Wood, as well as in her television film Pat and Margaret. His other television appearances included Andy Capp (1988), Crown Court (1975), War and Peace (1972), East Lynne (1976), The Cuckoo Waltz (1977), The Liver Birds (1978), Galloping Galaxies (1986), Rules of Engagement (1989) and Doctors (2005).

Lowrie did auditions and voiceover work from 1998 until 2003 for the Channel 4 quiz show Fifteen to One.

In September 2011, Lowrie was presented with a certificate by the Guinness World Records for being the person with the longest gap between television appearances as the same character in the same show, having returned to Coronation Street as Dennis Tanner earlier that year when his previous on-screen appearance as Dennis Tanner had been in June 1968. Lowrie made his final on-screen appearance as the character in July 2014. Lowrie's record of 43 years in between televised appearances as the same character in the same show was beaten in October 2022 by William Russell appearing in Doctor Who after a 57-year gap since his previous appearance as Ian Chesterton in June 1965. He subsequently played Mr Larkin in the ITV series Home Fires in 2016.

In addition to his work on television, Lowrie was also an accomplished theatre actor. Between May and June 1972, he appeared at the Hampstead Theatre in Patricia Welles's comedy The Lottery, directed by Ronald Hayman. He went on to star in many West End and stage productions, including performances as Major Metcalf in The Mousetrap (2004), Klever in The Case of The Frightened Lady (2018) and Eric in The Lady Vanishes (2019).

=== Death ===
Lowrie died on 25 April 2025, at the age of 88.

== Acting credits ==
=== Filmography ===
Year	Title	Role	Notes
1958	Saturday Playhouse		Series 1 episode 17: A Young Affair
1958	Starr and Company	1st Boy	Series 1 episode 51: Willie
1959	Sunday Night Theatre	Able Seaman Morris	Series 10 episode 1: The Stone Ship
1959	Sapphire	Student	Uncredited
1959	Serious Charge	Youth in Larry's Gang	Film; uncredited
1960-1968, 2011-2014	Coronation Street	Dennis Tanner	673 episodes
1963	Play of the Week	Tim	Series 10 episode 40: The Seventh Wave
1966	This Man Craig	Pupil	Series 1 episode 26: Old Flame
1970-1972	Kate	Leonard Snow	3 episodes
1972-1973	War and Peace	French Lieutenant/ French Captain/ Pierre's Second	3 episodes
1973	Putting on the Agony	Barry	Television film
1974	Notorious Woman	Alexandre Manceau	Series 1 episode 7: Rebolution
1975	Jackanory	Architect	Episode: The Emperor's Nightingale
1975	Crown Court	Dr. Pritchard	Series 4 episode 11: Matron: Part 2
1976	Cilla's World of Comedy	Philip Travers	Series 1 episode 6: Who's Your Friend?
1976	Golden Hill	Terry Ashby	5 episodes
1976	East Lynn	Archibald Carlyle	Television film
1977	The Cuckoo Waltz	Tom Napier	Series 3 episode 2: The Treat
1977	Devenish		Episode: The Great Exhibition
1978	A Soft Touch	Paul	Series 1 episode 3: Play Acting
1978	Tycoon	Gerry Speares	3 episodes
1978	The Liver Birds	Mr Green	Series 9 episode 4: Weeds
1980	Company and Co	Billy Hawkes	7 episodes
1983	Angels	Mike Roberts	3 episodes
1985	Voices in the Dark	David	Television film
1986	Galloping Galaxies!	Wimp	Series 2 episode 1
1987	The English Programme	David	2 episodes
1988	Andy Capp	Mr Watson	6 episodes
1988	Blind Justice	Milligan	1 episode
1989	Rules of Engagement	Nigel Quinn	4 episodes
1989	Victoria Wood	Keith/John Appleby	Episode 2: The Library, episode 4: We'd Quite Like to Apologise
1989	Casualty	Simon Spencer	Series 4 episode 12: Hanging On
1990	Rita Rudner		1 episode
1990	Frederick Forsyth Presents	Supt. Jamieson	Series 2 episode 2: Death Has A Bad Reputation
1993	Harry	Houseman	Series 1 episode 3
1994	Pat and Margaret	Martin/Warm Up Man	1 episode
2005	Doctors	Ron Cornwall	Series 7 episode 103: Lost for Words
2010	Casualty	Ancient Mariner	Series 24 episode 34: Alone on a Wide, Wide Sea
2012	Coronation Street: A Christmas Corrie	Dennis Tanner/Norris' Grandfather	Television short
2016	Home Fires	Mr Lakin	3 episodes
