= Richard Lintern =

English actor (born 1962)

- Born: Richard Charles Lintern; 8 October 1962 (age 63); Taunton, Somerset, England
- Occupation: Actor
- Years active: 1987–present
- Children: 3

Richard Charles Lintern (born 8 October 1962) is an English stage, voice and screen actor.

== Early life ==
Lintern was born in Taunton, Somerset. He studied English Literature at Durham University. He subsequently won a scholarship to the Royal Academy of Dramatic Art.

== Career ==
Lintern has an extensive stage career, spending most professional time in the West End and the Royal National Theatre. He has appeared across the UK, including leading roles at the Royal National Theatre, the Royal Shakespeare Company, the Royal Court Theatre, the West Yorkshire Playhouse, the Bristol Old Vic. and many others. Recent productions include Elephants at Hampstead Theatre, Jumpy at the Royal Court, Blue/Orange in Birmingham and Clybourne Park at the Park Theatre.

Lintern has played leading roles in a wide range of television and film projects. Recent productions include Silent Witness, Cell 8, Nolly, The Reckoning, Young Wallander, White House Farm, The Crown, Stephen, The Outpost, Professor T, and Death in Paradise. Earlier work includes White Heat, Top Boy, Page Eight, Pennyworth, The Shadowline, Lead Balloon, Screenplay, The Beggar Bride, Covington Cross, Midsomer Murders "Picture of Innocence", Cadfael, Lewis, She's Out, Demob, The Storyteller, Victoria Wood, The Line of Beauty, Forever Green, The Good Guys, The Bill, Casualty, Plotlands, Heartbeat, Performance, Holding the Baby, Bloodlines, which is loosely based on the life and disappearance of Lord Lucan, Taggart, The Inspector Lynley Mysteries and Agatha Christie's Poirot "Dead Man's Mirror" and "Mrs.McGinty's Dead".

Lintern played a young Muhammad Ali Jinnah in the 1998 film Jinnah, and an American police officer in the 1998 film Lost Souls. In 2003, Lintern also played the leading Pharisee in the word for word Bible film The Gospel of John. He also starred in the 2007 gay drama film by Channel 4 Clapham Junction, where he played Will, who is entering a civil partnership. He was also in The Bank Job in 2008, playing an MI5 officer ordered to retrieve the embarrassing proceeds of a bank robbery in 1970s London. Other films include Syriana, Page Eight, Malaventura, and The Calling. Lintern also appeared in the third series of the television drama, The House of Eliott. In 2011 he appeared in the BBC series The Shadow Line, and in 2012 in Hunted for BBC One and HBO. He played Hector Stokes. He played Thomas Chamberlain, the head of the Lyell Centre in the BBC series Silent Witness. Lintern bowed out of Silent Witness on 5 February 2020, after 7 years.

Lintern has played two characters in the UK television series Heartbeat. His first appearance was as Ray Richards, a drunken and abusive husband, in the final episode of the 11th series: Love's Sweet Dream. He then played the role of Ben Norton, the character making his first appearance in episode 13 of series 13: Dangerous Whispers.

Richard Lintern is also a voice-over artist, having voiced commercials for Gillette, Ferrero Rocher, Mercedes and Film4. He is the narrator of a number of documentary series including the BAFTA-winning Between Life and Death. In 2024 he played his first voice acting role in a video game as Igon in the Elden Ring expansion Shadow of the Erdtree.

== Personal life ==
Lintern is married and has three sons. The family lives in London and Somerset.

== Filmography ==
Year	Title	Role	Notes
1989	Victoria Wood	Kevin the Rock Star	Episode 6: 'Staying In'
1992	Victoria Wood's All Day Breakfast	Various characters	
1993	Agatha Christie's Poirot	John Lake	Episode: Dead Man's Mirror
1998	Jinnah	Muhammad Ali Jinnah (Younger)	
1998	Lost Souls	Graham Scofield	
2000	The Calling	Marc St.Clair	
2002	The Inspector Lynley Mysteries	Dr. Thorsson	Episode 3: "For the Sake of Elena"
2002	Heartbeat	Ray Richards	Episode 198: "Love's Sweet Dream"
2003	The Gospel of John	Leading Pharisee	
2003–2005	Heartbeat	Ben Norton	
2005	Syriana	Bryan's Boss	
2006	Natasha	Vicar	
2006	The Line of Beauty	Pete	
2007	Clapham Junction	Will	
2007	Cassandra's Dream	Director	
2007	Lewis	Sefton Linn	Season 1 Episode 2 ‘Whom the Gods Would Destroy’
2008	The Bank Job	Tim Everett	
2008	Agatha Christie's Poirot	Guy Carpenter	Episode: Mrs McGinty's Dead
2009	Unmade Beds	Anthony Hemmings	
2009	Victoria Wood's Mid Life Christmas	Various characters	
2011	The Suspicions of Mr Whicher	Henry Ludlow	
2011	The Shadow Line	DCS Richard Patterson	
2011	Page Eight	Max Vallance	
2012	Endeavour	Dr. Rowan Stromming	
2012	White Heat	Miles	
2012	Hunted	Hector Stokes	
2013	Spies of Warsaw	Colonel Lessard	4 episodes
2014–2020	Silent Witness	Dr Thomas Chamberlain	
2015	Foyle's War	Charles Lucas	Episode: "Trespass"
2017	The Crown	Stephen Ward	Episode: "Mystery Man"
2020	Shakespeare & Hathaway: Private Investigators	Stephen Capulet	Episode 3.9 "O Thou Invisible of Wine"
2023	The Reckoning	Robert Armstrong	Episode 3
2025	Robin Hood	Bishop of Hereford	

== Video games ==
Year	Title	Role	Notes
2024	Elden Ring	Igon	"Shadow of the Erdtree" expansion
