= Lill Roughley =

British actress (born 1949)

- Born: Lilian Margaret Roughley; 9 July 1949 (age 77); Prescot, Lancashire, England
- Other name: Lil Roughley
- Occupations: Actress; voice actress
- Years active: 1979–2009

Lilian Margaret Parry (born 9 July 1949), professionally known as Lill Roughley, is an English former actress who appeared on British television from the 1970s. Her notable roles include Alice in the first series of Mulberry and as Ella Dawkins in My Hero. In the 1980s and 1990s, she often worked with Victoria Wood, playing a variety of roles in Wood's various comedy programmes for the BBC.

== Life and career ==
Roughley was born in Prescot, Lancashire on 9 July 1949. She had minor roles in the 1970s and 1980s in programmes including All the Fun of the Fair, Tales of the Unexpected, Victoria Wood: As Seen on TV, Bergerac and Inspector Morse. She worked with Victoria Wood again in 1989, appearing in four of her six comedy plays for television and again in 1992's Victoria Wood's All Day Breakfast. Also in 1992 she played Alice in the first series of Mulberry. In the following years Roughley appeared in Minder, A Touch of Frost, the film Brassed Off, Joint Account, Hetty Wainthropp Investigates, Dinnerladies (a further collaboration with Victoria Wood) and Absolutely Fabulous (in the 2001 episode of the series, called "Small Opening", as the "actress" portraying Edina in the play written by Saffron, based on her own life). Roughley played Lorraine Thomson in one episode of Coronation Street, which aired on 17 May 1996. Roughley played Pamela Baverstock in the BBC Radio 4 sitcom Getting Nowhere Fast from 2001 until 2004. She played Ella Dawkins in the sitcom My Hero, from 2000 until 2006. She also played the sexually voracious landlady, Mrs Best, in another BBC Radio 4 sitcom, Hut 33, from 2007 until 2009.

== Filmography ==
Film
Year	Title	Role	Director
1979	All the Fun of the Fair	Jack's Wife	Glyn Edwards
1986	Mr. Love	Housewife	Roy Battersby
1996	Brassed Off	Rita	Mark Herman
1997	Keep the Aspidistra Flying	Mrs Trilling	Robert Bierman

Television
Year	Title	Role	Notes
1981	Big Jim and the Figaro Club	Pudden	Series 1 (recurring; 3 episodes)
1982	Tales of the Unexpected	Blonde Girl	Series 5 (guest; 1 episode)
1983	The Home Front	Myra	Series 1 (guest; 1 episode)
1984	A Family Man	Jean	Series 1 (guest; 1 episode)
1984	The Country Diary of an Edwardian Lady	Effie	Series 1 (recurring; 5 episodes)
1985–87	Victoria Wood: As Seen on TV	Various	Series 1–2 (4 episodes)
1985	Drummonds	Pam	Series 1 (recurring; 3 episodes)
1986	Starting Out	Mrs Barnes	Series 5 (guest; 2 episodes)
1986	Albion Market	Barbara Owen	Soap opera (guest; 1 episode)
1986	Paradise Postponed	Glenys Bigwell/Fawcett	Miniseries (recurring; 5 episodes)
1987	First Sight	Doreen	Series 1 (guest, 1 episode)
1987	Mister Corbett's Ghost	Mrs Partridge	Television film
1988	Hard Cases	Mrs Niechel	Series 1 (recurring; 4 episodes)
1988	Bergerac	Mrs Hetherington	Series 6 (guest; 1 episode)
1989	Inspector Morse	Betty Parker	Series 3 (guest; 1 episode)
1989–90	Joint Account	Louise	Series 1–2 (main; all 16 episodes)
1989	Flying Lady	Brenda Fisher	Series 2 (guest; 1 episode)
1989	Made in Spain	Jacque	Television film
1989	Victoria Wood	Various	Series 1 (4 episodes)
1990	Rita Rudner		Series 1 (guest; 2 episodes)
1991	Josie		Series 1 (guest; 1 episode)
1991–94	Minder	Doreen Daley	Series 8–10 (recurring; 6 episodes)
1992	The Common Pursuit	Charlotte Stout	Broadcast as part of Screen Two
1992	Mulberry	Alice	Series 1 (main; 6 episodes)
1993	Growing Pains	Miriam Craddock	Series 2 (guest; 1 episode)
1995	Just William	Mrs Bott	Series 2 (guest; 2 episodes)
1996	A Touch of Frost	Mrs Chatteris	Series 4 (guest; 1 episode)
1996	Roger Roger	Angela	Pilot episode (guest)
1996	Coronation Street	Lorraine Thomson	Soap opera (guest; 1 episode)
1997	Hetty Wainthropp Investigates	Maureen O'Callaghan	Series 3 (guest; 1 episode)
1998	The Last Salute	Sylvia	Series 1 (guest; 1 episode)
1998	Dinnerladies	Shelagh	Series 1 (guest; 1 episode)
2000–06	My Hero	Ella Dawkins	Series 1–6 (main; all 51 episodes)
2001	Absolutely Fabulous	Jude	Series 4 (guest; 1 episode)
2002	Heartbeat	Gloria Gray	Series 11 (guest; 1 episode)

Radio
Year	Title	Role
2001–2004	Getting Nowhere Fast	Pamela Baverstock
2007–2009	Hut 33	Mrs Best
