= Susie Blake =

English actress (born 1950)

- Born: 19 April 1950 (age 76); Highgate, London, England
- Education: Arts Educational Schools, London; London Academy of Music and Dramatic Art
- Occupation: Actress
- Years active: 1973–present
- Notable work: Coronation Street; Mrs. Brown's Boys
- Mother: Molly Blake
- Relatives: Annette Mills (grandmother); Sir John Mills (great uncle); Juliet Mills (cousin); Hayley Mills (cousin)

Susie Blake (born 19 April 1950) is an English television, radio and stage actress.

She is best known for her portrayal of the snobbish TV announcer in Victoria Wood: As Seen on TV and of Bev Unwin in Coronation Street, a role she played between 2003 and 2006, before a brief return in 2015. She has also played Hillary Nicholson in Mrs. Brown's Boys since 2011.

== Early life ==
Blake was born in Highgate, London to David and Molly Blake. Her mother was an illustrator and children's television presenter. Susie's maternal grandmother was the children's entertainer Annette Mills, her cousins are the actresses Juliet and Hayley Mills, whilst her uncle was the actor John Mills.

== Career ==
Blake regularly appeared in Victoria Wood's television programmes and has extensive radio credits. She appeared in the first episode of the sitcom One Foot in the Grave in which her character was responsible for firing Victor Meldrew, thus setting the events of the show in motion. She appeared as Bev Unwin in the ITV soap opera Coronation Street until her departure in December 2006.

Blake played the character of Madame Morrible in the West End production of Wicked, replacing Miriam Margolyes on 2 April 2007. Her final performance was on 12 April 2008, before she was succeeded by Harriet Thorpe. Blake appeared as a witch in the pantomime Wizard of Oz at The Lowry Theatre and Gallery, Salford, in 2004/2005.

In late 2008 to early 2009, she starred in the national UK tour of Boeing Boeing, and appeared as Judith in an episode of the third series of Wild at Heart. She was also in a national tour of Grumpy Old Women 2 in 2009 with Jenny Eclair and Wendi Peters.

Blake appeared as Hillary Nicholson in the RTÉ and BBC comedy Mrs. Brown's Boys, replacing Sorcha Cusack, who played Hillary in the first series. In 2015, she played The Queen in a theatre tour of the West End hit Handbagged.

Blake briefly reprised her Coronation Street role of Bev Unwin in July 2015 to help the long-running character Deirdre Barlow (played by Anne Kirkbride, who had recently died) bow out of the soap in January 2015.

In March 2019, Blake portrayed Agatha Christie's Miss Marple in a theatre production of The Mirror Crack'd at the Salisbury Playhouse. Then from 2023 to 2024, she will appear in a touring production of Murder in the Dark.

== Television ==
- Rooms, as Sarah (1974)
- Zodiac, as Peggy (1974)
- Armchair Thriller: A Dog's Ransom, as Marion Dowell (1978)
- Cribb, as Lotte (1979)
- Russ Abbot Madhouse (1981–1985)
- Victoria Wood: As Seen on TV (1985–1987)
- Something for the Weekend (1989)
- Victoria Wood (1989)
- One Foot in the Grave, as Victor Meldrew's boss (1990)
- Darling Buds of May, as Mrs. Jerebohm (1991)
- The Wail of the Banshee, as Faye Morgan (1992)
- All Day Breakfast (1992)
- Mud, as Miss Dudderidge (1994–1995)
- Sooty's Amazing Adventures, as all the females (apart from Katarina) (1997–1998)
- A Prince Among Men, as Beverly (1997–1998)
- Roger Roger, as Eve (1999)
- The Quiet Garden, as Mother (2002)
- Coronation Street, as Bev Unwin (2003–2006, 2015; 373 episodes)
- Kelly & Lewis, as Carol Taylour (2007–2009)
- Wild at Heart, as Judith (2008)
- Murder Most Foul, as Elizabeth Bailey (2008–2009, 2013)
- With all the trimmings (2009)
- Mrs. Brown's Boys, as Hillary Nicholson (2011–2015, 2017–present)
- Parents, as Alma Miller (2012)
- Great Night Out, as Mrs. B (2013)
- You, Me & Them, as Emma Grey (2013–2015)
- Cuckoo, as Belinda (2016)
- Murder on the Blackpool Express, as Marjorie (2017)
- Casualty, as Belle Radnor (2019)
- The Real Marigold Hotel, as herself (2020)
- Not Going Out, as Carol (2021)
- Kate & Koji, as Joyce (2022)

== Radio ==
- Star Terk Two (1985/1986)
- The Phenomenon Squad (1987)
- Barrymore Plus Four (1995)
- Auntie's Secret Box (1996)

== Theatre ==
- The Mirror Crack'd at the Salisbury Playhouse (2019)
- Murder in the Dark across the UK and Ireland (2023)
