= Victoria Wood =

British comedian (1953–2016)

Victoria Wood CBE
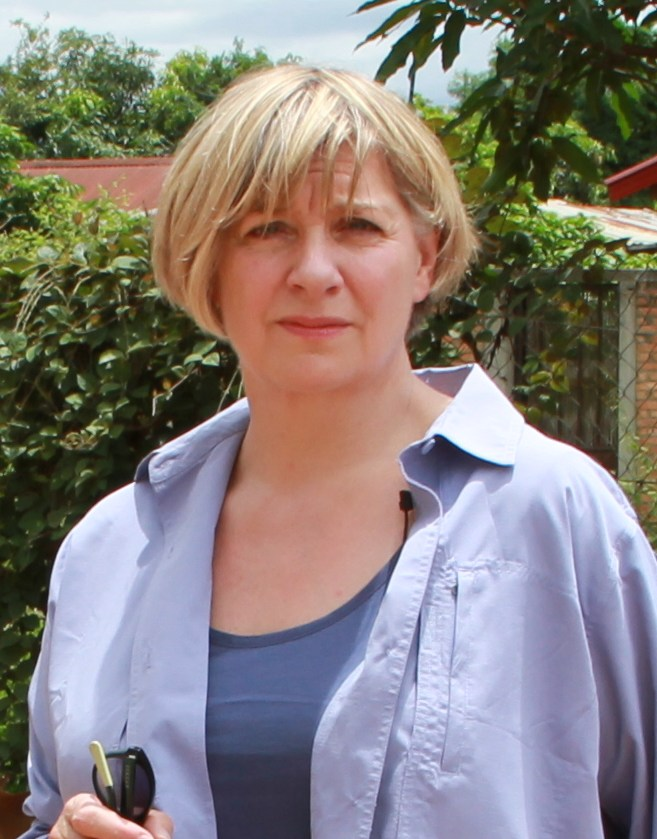
- Wood in 2012
- Born: 19 May 1953; Prestwich, Lancashire, England
- Died: 20 April 2016 (aged 62); London, England
- Education: University of Birmingham
- Occupations: Comedian; actress; musician; screenwriter; director
- Years active: 1974–2016
- Notable work: Victoria Wood: As Seen on TV; Victoria Wood; dinnerladies; Housewife, 49
- Style: Stand-up; Observational humour
- Spouse: Geoffrey Durham (m. 1980; div. 2005)
- Children: 2
- Relatives: Chris Foote Wood (brother)
- Awards: See awards and recognition
- Victoria Wood's voice during the BBC Radio 4 programme Desert Island Discs broadcast 23 December 2007

Victoria Wood (19 May 1953 – 20 April 2016) was an English comedian, actress, musician, screenwriter, and director. Wood wrote and starred in dozens of sketches, plays, musicals, films and sitcoms over several decades, and her live comedy act was interspersed with her own compositions which she performed at the piano. Much of her humour was grounded in everyday life and included references to activities, attitudes and products that are considered to exemplify Britain. She was noted for her skills in observational comedy and in satirising aspects of social class.

Wood started her career in 1974 by appearing on, and winning, the ATV talent show New Faces. She established herself as a comedy star in the 1980s, winning a BAFTA TV Award in 1986 for the sketch series Victoria Wood: As Seen on TV (1985–87), and became one of Britain's most popular stand-up comics, winning a second BAFTA for An Audience with Victoria Wood (1988). In the 1990s, she wrote and co-starred in the television film Pat and Margaret (1994), and the sitcom dinnerladies (1998–2000), which she also produced. She won two more BAFTA TV Awards, including Best Actress, for her 2006 ITV1 television film, Housewife, 49. Her frequent long-term collaborators included Julie Walters, Celia Imrie, Duncan Preston, and Anne Reid. In 2006, Wood came tenth in ITV's poll of the British public's 50 Greatest TV Stars.

== Early life ==
Victoria Wood was the youngest child of Stanley and Ellen "Nellie" Wood (née Mape). Stanley worked as an insurance salesman, who also wrote songs for his company's Christmas parties, was the author of the musical play Clogs (based in a Lancashire village in 1887) and wrote part-time for Coronation Street and others. She had three siblings: a brother, Chris, and two sisters, Penny and Rosalind.

Wood was born in Prestwich and brought up in nearby Bury. She was educated at Fairfield County Primary School and Bury Grammar School for Girls, where she immediately found herself out of her depth.

I was always top of the class, and when I went to grammar school I could not deal with everyone being as clever... I went under. I was a mess, a bit of a misfit. I didn't have any friends, let alone try to be funny...I didn't do any work, didn't have clean clothes and didn't wash. If I didn't have any money I'd steal from people, and if I hadn't done my homework I'd steal someone else's. I was envious of all the groups: the horsey group, the girls who went out with boys, the clever ones. Looking back, I feel really sorry for that little girl.

Wood developed eating disorders, but in 1968, her father gave her a piano for her 15th birthday. She later said of this unhappy time "The good thing about being isolated is you get a good look at what goes on. I was reading, writing and working at the piano all the time. I was doing a lot of other things that helped me to perform." Later that year, she joined the Rochdale Youth Theatre Workshop, where she felt she was "in the right place and knew what I was doing" and she made an impression with her comic skill and skill in writing. She went on to study in the Department of Drama and Theatre Arts at the University of Birmingham.

== Career ==
=== 1970s ===
Wood began her show business career while an undergraduate, appearing on the ITV talent show New Faces in 1974. It led to an appearance in a sketch show featuring the series' winners The Summer Show. A further break came as a novelty act on the BBC's consumer affairs programme That's Life! in 1976. She had met long-term collaborator Julie Walters in 1971, when Wood applied to the Manchester School of Theatre, then part of Manchester Polytechnic. Coincidentally, the pair met again when they appeared in the same theatre revue In at the Death in 1978 (for which Wood wrote a brief sketch). Its success led to the commissioning of Wood's first play Talent (in 1978), starring Hazel Clyne (in a role originally written for Walters), for which Wood won an award for the Most Promising New Writer. Peter Eckersley, the head of drama at Granada Television, saw Talent and invited Wood to create a television adaptation. This time, Julie Walters took the lead role, while Wood reprised her stage role. In 2019, John Lloyd revealed that Wood was offered the female role in Not the Nine O'Clock News, but turned it down.

=== 1980–1988 ===
The success of the television version of Talent led to Wood writing the follow-up Nearly a Happy Ending. Shortly afterwards she wrote a third play for Granada, Happy Since I Met You, again with Walters alongside Duncan Preston as the male lead. In 1980 she wrote and starred in the stage play Good Fun.

Recognising her talent, Eckersley offered Wood a sketch show, although Wood was unsure of the project: she agreed to go ahead only if Walters received equal billing. Eckersley came up with an obvious title – Wood and Walters, and the pilot episode was recorded. It led to a full series, featuring Duncan Preston and a supporting cast. In the period between the completion of the pilot and the shooting of the series, Eckersley died. Wood credited him with giving her her first big break, and felt that Wood and Walters suffered due to his death. She was not impressed by Brian Armstrong, his fill-in, and was of the opinion that he hired unsuitable supporting actors.

Wood appeared alongside Peter Llewellyn-Jones as an actor/presenter in Yorkshire Television's 1984 schools television programme for hearing-impaired children, Insight - a remake of the series originally presented by Derek Griffiths. In 1982 and 1983 she appeared as a panellist on BBC Radio 4's Just a Minute.

In October 1983 Wood performed her first solo stand-up show, Lucky Bag, in a five-week run at the King's Head Theatre in Islington. The show transferred to the Ambassadors Theatre for a 12-night run in February 1984. Lucky Bag went on a short UK tour in November and December 1984 and was also released as a live album recorded at the Edinburgh Festival in 1983.

Wood left Granada in 1984 for the BBC, which promised her more creative control over projects. Later that year her sketch show Victoria Wood: As Seen on TV went into production. Wood chose the actors: her friend Julie Walters once again starred, as did Duncan Preston. Wood's friends Celia Imrie, Susie Blake and Patricia Routledge were in the cast. As Seen on TV featured the Acorn Antiques series of sketches, parodying the low-budget soap opera Crossroads, and rumoured to be named after an antiques shop in her birthplace. Acorn Antiques is remembered for characters such as "Mrs Overall" (played by Walters), the deliberately bad camera angles and wobbling sets, and Celia Imrie's sarcastic tone as "Miss Babs". One of Wood's most popular comic songs, "The Ballad of Barry and Freda (Let's Do It)", originated on this show. It tells the story of Freda (a woman eager for sex) and Barry (an introverted man terrified of intimate relations), and makes clever use of allusions to a multitude of risqué activities while avoiding all taboo words.

Following the success of the first series of Victoria Wood: As Seen on TV, Wood went on tour again with Lucky Bag in March 1985. Scene, a documentary for BBC2 later that year, showed footage of Wood preparing for the tour and clips of her performing the show at Derby Assembly Rooms.

A second series of Victoria Wood: As Seen on TV was made in 1986. Before filming began in the summer, Wood went on a 22-date tour of England and Scotland during March and April. A final 'Special' 40-minute episode of As Seen on TV was made in 1987 and broadcast later that year.

During autumn 1987 Wood went on the road with what was to be her largest tour yet. The tour included a sell-out two-week run at the London Palladium, and had a second leg in the spring of 1988.

In 1988 she appeared in the BAFTA-winning An Audience with Victoria Wood for ITV. At the time of recording the show she was six months pregnant. The end of 1988 saw the release of her second live album Victoria Wood Live, recorded at the Brighton Dome.

Wood recorded two songs for the 1985 movie Return to Oz. Neither were used in the final release.

=== 1989–1999 ===
During this period Wood moved away from the sketch show format and into more self-contained works, often with a bittersweet flavour. Victoria Wood (six parts, 1989) featured Wood in several individual stories such as "We'd Quite Like To Apologise", set in an airport departure lounge, and "Over to Pam", set around a fictional talk show.

In May 1990, Wood began a large sell-out tour of the United Kingdom, which was followed by a ten-week run at the Strand Theatre in London titled Victoria Wood Up West. Wood took the show on the road again during March and April 1991, where it was recorded at the Mayflower Theatre in Southampton, and later released as Victoria Wood Sold Out in 1991.

In 1991, she appeared on the Comic Relief single performing "The Smile Song", the flipside to "The Stonk" (a record by ITV comedians Gareth Hale and Norman Pace with charity supergroup The Stonkers). A UK number-one single for one week on 23 March 1991, the record was the UK's 22nd-best-selling single of the year. However, even though it was a joint-single (with "The Smile Song" credited on the front of the single cover and listed as track 2 on the seven-inch and CD single rather than being a B-side), the UK singles chart compilers (now the Official Charts Company) did not credit her with having number one hit, in a situation similar to the fate of BAD II's "Rush", the AA-side of the preceding number one, "Should I Stay or Should I Go" by The Clash.

She briefly returned to sketches for the 1992 Christmas Day special Victoria Wood's All Day Breakfast, and also branched out into children's animation, voicing all the characters for the CBBC series Puppydog Tales.

In April 1993, Wood began a seven-month tour of the UK. The 104-date tour broke box office records, including 15 sell out shows at London's Royal Albert Hall, and played to residencies in Sheffield, Birmingham, Plymouth, Bristol, Nottingham, Manchester, Leicester, Liverpool, Bournemouth, Oxford, Southampton, Newcastle, Glasgow, Edinburgh, Leeds and Hull.

The television film Pat and Margaret (1994), starring Wood and Julie Walters as long-lost sisters with very different lifestyles, continued her return to stand-alone plays with a poignant undercurrent to the comedy.

On Christmas Day 1994, Wood starred in the one-off BBC 50-minute programme based on her 1993/94 stage show Victoria Wood: Live in Your Own Home. The special featured stand-up routines, character monologues and songs. An extended 80 minute version was released on VHS.

Wood went on a 68-date sell-out tour of the UK between May - October 1996, which played at venues in Leicester, Sheffield, Ipswich, Blackpool, Wolverhampton, Bradford, Newcastle, Bournemouth, Brighton, Nottingham, Oxford, Southend, Manchester and Cambridge. The tour culminated with another 15 sell-out shows at London's Royal Albert Hall in the autumn. The tour recommenced in April 1997 in Liverpool, also taking in Reading, Birmingham, Bristol, Sheffield, Halifax, Glasgow, Nottingham, Brighton, Portsmouth, Oxford, Edinburgh and Aberdeen. Wood then took the show to Australia and New Zealand during July and August. It was later released as Victoria Wood Live 1997 filmed at the High Wycombe Swan Theatre during the tours final shows in September.

In October 1997, Wood released a compilation of 14 of her songs titled Victoria Wood, Real Life The Songs.

Her first sitcom dinnerladies (1998), continued her now established milieu of mostly female characters depicted vividly and amusingly, but with a counterpoint of sadder themes.

=== 2000–2005 ===
December 2000 saw the Christmas sketch show special Victoria Wood with All the Trimmings, featuring her regular troupe of actors as well as a string of special guest stars including Hugh Laurie, Angela Rippon, Bob Monkhouse, Bill Paterson, Delia Smith and Roger Moore.

2001 saw Wood embark on her final stand-up tour, Victoria Wood at It Again but was postponed slightly by Wood having to have an emergency hysterectomy shortly before the tour was due to begin. She re-wrote the entire first half of the show and incorporated the operation into her act. The 85-date tour included another residency at the Royal Albert Hall and finished in April 2002.

During this period, Wood tended to move away from comedy to concentrate on drama. She continued to produce one-off specials including Victoria Wood's Sketch Show Story (2002) and Victoria Wood's Big Fat Documentary (2005).

Wood wrote her first musical, Acorn Antiques: The Musical!, which opened in 2005 at the Theatre Royal, Haymarket, London, for a limited period, directed by Trevor Nunn. It starred several of the original cast, with Sally Ann Triplett playing Miss Berta (played in the series by Wood). Wood played Julie Walters' lead role of Mrs Overall for Monday and Wednesday matinee performances.

=== 2006–2010 ===
Wood wrote the one-off ITV serious drama Housewife, 49 (2006), an adaptation of the diaries of Nella Last, and played the eponymous role of an introverted middle-aged character who discovers new confidence and friendships in Lancashire during the Second World War. Housewife, 49 was critically acclaimed, and Wood won BAFTAs for both her acting and writing for this drama; a rare double. The film also starred Stephanie Cole and David Threlfall as well as, in a small role, Sue Wallace with whom Wood had worked before and studied alongside at Birmingham.

In November 2006, Wood directed a revival production of Acorn Antiques: The Musical! with a new cast. The musical opened at the Lowry in Salford in December and toured the United Kingdom from January to July 2007.

In January 2007, she appeared as herself in a series of advertisements featuring famous people working for the supermarket chain Asda. They featured Wood working in the bakery and introduced a catchphrase – "there's no place like ASDA". Wood was the subject of an episode of The South Bank Show in March 2007, and is the only woman to be the subject of two South Bank programmes (the previous occasion was in September 1996).

Wood appeared in a three-part travel documentary on BBC One called Victoria's Empire, in which she travelled around the world in search of the history, cultural impact and customs the British Empire placed on the parts of the world it ruled. She departed Victoria Station, London, for Calcutta, Hong Kong and Borneo in the first programme. In programme two she visited Ghana, Jamaica and Newfoundland and in the final programme, New Zealand, Australia and Zambia, finishing at the Victoria Falls.

In a tribute to Wood, the British television station UKTV Gold celebrated her work with a weekend marathon of programmes between 3 and 4 November 2007, featuring programmes such as Victoria Wood Live and dinnerladies and Victoria Wood: As Seen on TV – its first screening on British television since 1995.

Wood returned to stand-up comedy, with a special performance for the celebratory show Happy Birthday BAFTA on 28 October 2007, alongside other household names. The programme was transmitted on ITV1 on Wednesday 7 November 2007. On Boxing Day 2007 she appeared as "Nana" in the Granada dramatisation of Noel Streatfeild's novel Ballet Shoes.

In December 2007, when a guest on the radio programme Desert Island Discs, Wood said she was about to make her first foray into film, writing a script described as a contemporary comedy about a middle-aged person. On Thursday, 12 June 2008, Wood was a member of the celebrity guest panel on the series The Apprentice: You're Fired! on BBC Two. In June 2009, she appeared as a panellist on the first two episodes of a series of I'm Sorry I Haven't a Clue.

In 2009, Wood provided the voice of God for Liberace, Live From Heaven by Julian Woolford at London's Leicester Square Theatre. Wood returned to television comedy for a one-off Christmas sketch-show special, her first for nine years, Victoria Wood's Mid Life Christmas, transmitted on BBC One at 21:00 on Christmas Eve 2009. It reunited Wood with Julie Walters in Lark Pies to Cranchesterford, a spoof of BBC period dramas Lark Rise to Candleford, Little Dorrit and Cranford; a spoof documentary, Beyond the Marigolds, following Acorn Antiques star Bo Beaumont (Walters); highlights from the Mid Life Olympics 2009 with Wood as the commentator; parodies of personal injury advertisements; and a reprise of Wood's most famous song "The Ballad of Barry and Freda" ("Let's Do It"), performed as a musical number with tap-dancers and a band. Victoria Wood: Seen On TV, a 90-minute documentary looking back on her career, was broadcast on BBC Two on 21 December, whilst a behind-the-scenes special programme about Midlife Christmas, Victoria Wood: What Larks!, was broadcast on BBC One on 30 December.

=== 2011–2016 ===
On New Year's Day 2011, Wood appeared in a BBC drama Eric and Ernie as Eric Morecambe's mother, Sadie Bartholomew.

For the 2011 Manchester International Festival, Wood wrote, composed and directed That Day We Sang, a musical set in 1969 with flashbacks to 1929. It tells the story of a middle-aged couple who find love after meeting on a TV programme about a choir they both sang in 40 years previously. Although the characters are imaginary, the choir sang with the Hallé Youth Orchestra in Manchester's Free Trade Hall on a record that sold more than a million copies. Apart from the pieces on the 1929 recording (Purcell's "Nymphs and Shepherds" and the Evening Benediction from Hansel and Gretel) the score for the musical was written by Wood. She also narrated the 2012 miniseries The Talent Show Story.

On 22 December 2012, Wood was a guest on BBC Radio 2's Saturday morning Graham Norton Show. On 23 December BBC One screened Loving Miss Hatto, a drama written by Wood about the life of concert pianist Joyce Hatto, the centre of a scandal over the authenticity of her recordings and her role in the hoax. In April 2013, Wood produced a documentary about the history of tea named Victoria Wood's Nice Cup of Tea. In 2013 she played retired constable-turned-security-guard Tracy in BBC Scotland's Case Histories starring Jason Isaacs. She appeared in an episode of QI, broadcast on 13 December 2013, and around the same time made two return appearances on I'm Sorry I Haven't a Clue during the show's 60th series in which she joined in the game One song to the tune of Another, singing the Bob the Builder theme "Can We Fix It?" to the tune of "I Dreamed a Dream". In March 2014, Wood voiced the TV advertisement for the tour of the old set of Coronation Street. On 5 December 2014 Wood was a guest on BBC's The Graham Norton Show. On 26 December 2014, a television movie adaptation of That Day We Sang, directed by Wood, starring Michael Ball and Imelda Staunton, was shown on BBC Two.

In early 2015, Wood took part in a celebrity version of The Great British Bake Off for Comic Relief and was crowned Star Baker in her episode. She co-starred with Timothy Spall in Sky television's three-part television adaptation of Fungus the Bogeyman, which was first shown on 27, 28 & 29 December 2015, her final acting role.

=== Collaborators ===
Wood was known for using many of the same actors in her projects, which comedian Tiff Stevenson later described as "this core of people who she knew she worked well with, and why would [she] want to walk away from that?" Duncan Preston said of these recurring appearances, "I wouldn't say that we were her favourite actors; I think we were like a company that she had." Celia Imrie commented that Wood's "team" approach "meant that we could work together very fast." An overview of these recurring cast members is shown below:

Actor	As Seen on TV	Victoria Wood	All Day Breakfast	Pat and Margaret	dinnerladies	With All the Trimmings	Mid Life Christmas
Kay Adshead	Recurring	1 episode			Guest		
Susie Blake	Regular	2 episodes					
Jim Broadbent	Recurring	1 episode					
Deborah Grant	Recurring	1 episode					
Philip Lowrie		2 episodes					
Celia Imrie	Regular	3 episodes			Regular		
Duncan Preston	Regular	1 episode			Regular		
Anne Reid	Guest	2 episodes			Regular		
Lill Roughley	Recurring	4 episodes			Guest		
Julie Walters	Regular	3 episodes			Recurring		

== Filmography ==
Year	Title	Role	Is Writer?	Type	1st aired Date	1st aired Channel	Runtime	Notes
2026	Becoming Victoria Wood	Self		Documentary	9 January 2026	Cinema	90 minutes	Tribute
2020	Victoria Wood's Secret List	Self		TV Series	25 December 2020, 26 December 2020	BBC Two	2x 60 minutes	Tribute. Sketches handpicked by Wood. With insight from friends and fans, rare and unseen footage.
2017	Our Friend Victoria	Self		TV Series	11 April 2017 – 23 December 2017	BBC One	6x 30 minutes + 39 minutes (Christmas special)	Tribute. "Age", "People", "Sex", "Appearance", "Television", "At Christmas"
2015	The Great Comic Relief Bake Off	Self (Contestant)		TV Series	4 March 2015	BBC Two	60 minutes	
2015	Fungus the Bogeyman	Actor (Snotsoup)		TV Series	27 December 2015 – 29 December 2015	Sky One	67 minutes, 60 minutes, 43 minutes	All three episodes
2014	The Graham Norton Show	Self (Guest)		TV talk show	5 December 2014	BBC One	50 minutes	1 episode. With Michael Keaton, Ian McKellen, One Direction. Also appeared twice on Norton's Radio 2 show.
2014	Victoria Wood: That Musical We Made	Self	Yes	Documentary	26 December 2014	BBC Two	60 minutes	Making of That Day We Sang
2014	That Day We Sang	Director	Yes	Screenplay	26 December 2014	BBC Two	90 minutes	Last major work. Starring Michael Ball and Imelda Staunton. Featured at Manchester International Festival.
2013	A Nice Cup of Tea	Self - presenter	Yes	Documentary	10 April 2013 – 11 April 2013	BBC One	2x 60 minutes	
2013	Case Histories	Actor (Tracy)		TV Series	19 May 2013	BBC One	90 minutes	1 episode
2013	QI	Self (Guest)		TV Series	13 December 2013	BBC One	30 minutes	1 episode
2012	Loving Miss Hatto	Executive Producer	Yes	TV Movie	23 December 2012	BBC One		
2012	Ruddy Hell! It's Harry & Paul	Self (Guest)		TV Series	11 November 2012	BBC One	3x 30 minutes	3 episodes
2012	Bring me Morecambe and Wise	Self (Narrator)		TV Series	21 November 2012	GOLD	5x 60 minutes	all 5 episodes
2011	The Borrowers	Actor (Granny Driver)		TV Movies	16 December 2011	BBC One	90 minutes	
2011	Comic Relief: Red Nose Day 2011	Actor (Mrs Crawler)	Yes	TV special	18 March 2011	BBC One	7 minutes & 9 minutes	Downton Abbey Sketch (2 parts)
2011	Eric & Ernie	Actor (Sadie Bartholemew)	Yes	TV Movie	1 January 2011	BBC Two	90 minutes	
2010	Victoria Wood's Little Cracker	Self, Director	Yes	TV Series	25 December 2010	Sky One	15 minutes	1 episode
2010	The Angina Monologues	Self	Yes	Stand-up	12 December 2010	DVD	39 minutes	for British Heart Foundation
2009	Victoria Wood: What Larks!	Actor	Yes	TV Movie	late 2009	BBC One	44 minutes	Also Known As "What I Did on My Holidays" Making of Midlife Christmas
2009	Victoria Wood's Midlife Christmas	Self	Yes	TV special	24 December 2009	BBC One	60 minutes	Christmas special
2008	The Apprentice: You're fired!	Self (Guest)		TV Series	11 June 2008	BBC Three	30 minutes	1 episode
2007	Ballet Shoes	Actor (Nana)		TV Movie	26 December 2007	BBC One	85 minutes	
2007	Happy Birthday BAFTA	Self	Yes	Stand-up	28 October 2007	BBC One	90 minutes	segments within the show
2007	Clive James: Talking in the Library	Self (Guest)		TV Series	19 September 2007	Artsworld	30 minutes	1 episode. Interview
2007	Victoria's Empire	Self	Yes	Documentary	29 April 2007	BBC One	3x 60 minutes	
1987, 2007	ASDA adverts	Actor		TV adverts	1987, 2007	British TV Advert	30 seconds, 1 minute	The 1987 ad also features Julie Walters
2006	Dawn French's Girls Who Do Comedy	Self (Guest)		TV Series	29 December 2006	BBC Four	30 minutes	1 episode Interview
2005	What ITV Did For Me	Self		TV Series	20 September 2005	ITV1	120 minutes	Interview
2005	The League of Gentlemen's Apocalypse	Actor (Queen Mary II)		Movie	3 June 2005	Cinema	92 minutes	Cameo
2005	Victoria Wood: A BAFTA Tribute	Self (Guest)		TV special	February 5t 2005	BBC Two	60 minutes	
2005	Acorn Antiques: The Musical!	Actor (Bo Beaumont)	Yes	Screenplay	27 January 2005 (Stage) 13 March 2006 (DVD)	West End, DVD	157 minutes	Played Mrs Overall on Bingo Nights
2005	Housewife, 49	Actor (Nella Last)	Yes	TV Movie	10 December 2006	ITV1	95 minutes	
2004	Victoria Wood's Big Fat Documentary	Self	Yes	Documentary	9 January 2004 – 16 January 2004	BBC One	2x 60 minutes	
2001	Victoria Wood: Victoria at the Albert - Live	Self	Yes	Stand-up	25 November 2002	DVD	108 minutes	"at it again" tour. Royal Albert Hall's record for most shows in a run by any comedian and any female performer
2001	Victoria Wood's Sketch Show Story	Self	Yes	Documentary	25 October 2001 – 1 November 2001	BBC Two	2x 30 minutes	
2000	Victoria Wood with All the Trimmings	Actor	Yes	TV special	25 December 2000	BBC One	52 minutes	Christmas special
2000	Don't Panic! The Dad's Army Story	Self	Yes	TV special	28 May 2000 at 6:40pm	BBC One	39 minutes	
1999	The Nearly Complete and Utter History of Everything	Actor (Hairdresser)		TV special	2 January 2000	BBC One	50 minutes	Featuring Thora Hird
1999	Shaggy Dog Story	Actor (Brenda Furlong)		TV Promo	25 December 1999	BBC	3 minutes	Promo for Children In Need
1998-2000	dinnerladies	Actor (Brenda Furlong), Producer	Yes	TV Sitcom	12 November 1998 – 27 January 2000	BBC One	16x 30 minutes	
1998	Best Of British	Self		Documentary	11 November 1998	BBC One	39 minutes	1 episode. Documentary on Wood's life
1997	Victoria Wood: Live	Self	Yes	Stand-up	13 November 1997	BBC One	97 minutes	
1997	Heroes of Comedy	Self		TV Series		Channel 4		Features in five episodes but not the subject of the show
1996, 2007	The South Bank Show	Self		TV Series	15 September 1996, 11 March 2007	ITV1	2x 60 minutes	Making Wood the first female subject of two South Bank Shows
1996	The Wind in the Willows	Actor (The tea lady)		Movie	11 October 1996	Cinema	88 minutes	Released on VHS and DVD as Mr. Toad's Wild Ride in the United States
1996	Great Railway Journeys	Self	Yes	TV Series	21 November 1996	BBC Two	60 minutes	1 episode - "Crewe to Crewe"
1995	Victoria Wood's Dawn	Actress	Yes	TV special	Match 17th 1885	BBC One	5 minutes	Feat Dawn French
1994	Victoria Wood: Live in Your Own Home	Self	Yes	TV special	25 December 1994	BBC One	80 minutes	First released on VHS on 31 October 1994
1994	Pat and Margaret	Actor (as Margaret Mottershead)	Yes	TV Movie	11 September 1994	BBC One	90 minutes	
1992	Victoria Wood's All Day Breakfast	Actor (Sally Cumbernauld)	Yes	TV special	20 December 1992	BBC One	50 minutes	Christmas special
1991	Julie Walters & Friends	Actor	Yes	TV Sitcom	29 December 1991	ITV1	60 minutes	With Alan Bennett
1991	Victoria Wood: Sold Out	Self	Yes	Stand-up	1 January 1991	ITV1, VHS	60 minutes	
1991	Comic Relief		Yes	TV special	15 March 1991	BBC One	395 minutes	Uncredited
1991	Anytime Tales	Narrator		Children's TV series	13 January 1993	CBBC	5 minutes	Features in 1 of 10 short stories
1988	Aspel And Company	Guest		TV Talk Show	2 April 1988, 20 June 1993	ITV1	30-60 minutes	Two episodes With Harry Enfield, Dolly Parton; with Kate Bush and Lenny Henry.
1984-1998	Jackanory	Storyteller		Children's TV series	17 January 1984	BBC One	16x 15 minutes	16 episodes
1989	Victoria Wood	Self, Creator	Yes	TV Sitcom	19 November 1989	BBC One	10-50 minutes, 108 minutes	6 one-off sitcoms and a Christmas special: "Mens Sana in Thingummy Doodah", "The Library", "Over to Pam", "We'd Quite Like to Apologise", "Val de Ree (Ha Ha Ha Ha Ha)", "Staying In", "The Ballad of Fatty Arbuckle"
1989	Puppydog Tales	Scriptwriter, narrator	Yes	Children's TV Series	17 September 1992	Knowledge Network, Canada first then BBC	13x 5 minutes	All 13 episodes
1988	An Audience with Victoria Wood	Self	Yes	TV special	10 December 1988	ITV1	55 minutes	
1988	Comic Relief	Actor (Joan)	Yes	TV special	5 February 1988	BBC One	30 minutes	"Wood, Walters... and Wise" segment within full show
1985	Acorn Antiques	Actor (Berta)	Yes	TV Series	11 January 1985	BBC Two (within As Seen On TV)	12x 5 minutes	
1985-1987	Victoria Wood: As Seen on TV	Self, Actor, Composer	Yes	Sketch Show	11 January 1985	BBC Two	12 x 30 minutes, 40 minutes	Two seasons of six episodes each, plus Christmas special. Wood's first work for the BBC
1984	Insight	Presenter/Wordwitch		Educational	February 1984 - June 1984	ITV Schools	18x 15 minutes	18 Episode
1981-1982	Wood & Walters	Actor, Self	Yes	TV Series	1 January 1982	ITV1	8 x 30 minutes	
1981	Happy Since I Met You	Actor, Self	Yes	Screenplay	9 August 1981	ITV1	50 minutes	
1980	Nearly a Happy Ending	Actor, Self	Yes	Screenplay	11 January 1985	ITV1	85 minutes	Sequel to Talent
1979	Talent	Actor (Maureen)	Yes	Screenplay	5 August 1979	ITV1	65 minutes	First time Wood and Walters worked together on TV
1977	Pandora's Box	Self		TV Series	1977	BBC One	6x 30 minutes	All six episodes. Six half-hour discussions about justice, education and health, with only women on the panel.
1976	That's Life!	Guest musician		TV Series	21 March 1976 - 2 May 1976	BBC One	3x 5 minutes	3 episodes
1975	The Summer Show	Self		Sketch Show	2 August 1975	ATV	45 minutes	Featured Wood alongside the winners of New Faces.
1974	New Faces	Self		TV talent show	12 October 1974	ATV	30 minutes	

== Awards and recognition ==
In 1979, Wood received the Charles Wintour Award for Most Promising Playwright at the Evening Standard Theatre Awards for her play Talent.

In 1996, the BBC celebrated its 60th anniversary with an awards ceremony titled Auntie's All Time Greats. In it, As Seen on TV beat Monty Python's Flying Circus for "Favourite Comedy Series". It beat the same show again when it won 'best sketch show' in the Radio Times Comedy Poll in 2001.

In 1997, Wood was appointed an Officer of the Order of the British Empire (OBE) in the 1997 Birthday Honours. Earlier in 1994, she was made an honorary Doctor of Letters by the University of Sunderland. She was appointed a Commander of the Order of the British Empire (CBE) in the 2008 Birthday Honours.

In 2003, she was listed in The Observer as one of the 50 Funniest Acts in British Comedy. In the 2005 Channel 4 poll the Comedians' Comedian, she was voted 27th out of the top 50 comedy acts by fellow comedians and comedy insiders. She was the highest-ranked woman on the list, above French and Saunders (who paid tribute to her in their Lord of the Rings spoof, where a map of Middle-Earth shows a forest called 'Victoria Wood'), Joan Rivers and Joyce Grenfell.

Her sketch show Victoria Wood: As Seen on TV won BAFTA awards for its two series and Christmas Special. In 2007, she was nominated for and won the BAFTA awards for "Best Actress" and for "Best Single Drama" for her role in the British war-time drama Housewife, 49, in which she played the part of a housewife dominated by her moody husband. Wood's character eventually stands up to him and helps the WRVS (Women's Royal Voluntary Service) in their preparations for British soldiers.

Her popularity with the British public was confirmed when she won 'Best Stand-Up' and 'Best Sketch Show' by Radio Times readers in 2001. Wood was also voted 'Funniest Comedian' by the readers of Reader's Digest in 2005 and came eighth in ITV's poll of the public's 50 Greatest Stars, four places behind long term regular co-star Julie Walters. In 1996, The South Bank Show opened their 20th season with Wood, describing her as "Britain's first female stand up comedian".

Wood was the recipient of six British Comedy Awards: Best stand-up live comedy performer (1990); Best female comedy performer (1995); WGGB Writer of the year (2000); Best live stand-up (2001); Outstanding achievement award (jointly awarded to Julie Walters) (2005); Best female TV comic (2011). Wood was nominated for the 1991 Olivier Award for Best Entertainment for Victoria Wood Up West and for the 2006 Olivier Award for Best New Musical for Acorn Antiques: The Musical!.

=== BAFTA nominations ===
Wood was a 14-time BAFTA TV Award nominee, winning four. She received a special BAFTA at a tribute evening in 2005.

Year	Award	Nominated work	Result
1986	Best Light Entertainment Performance	Victoria Wood: As Seen on TV	Won
1987	Best Light Entertainment Performance	Victoria Wood: As Seen on TV	Nominated
1988	Best Light Entertainment Performance	Victoria Wood: As Seen on TV	Nominated
1989	Best Light Entertainment Performance	An Audience With Victoria Wood	Won
1990	Best Light Entertainment Performance	Victoria Wood	Nominated
1995	Best Actress	Pat and Margaret	Nominated
1995	Best Single Drama	Pat and Margaret	Nominated
1995	Best Light Entertainment Performance	Victoria Wood: Live in Your Own Home	Nominated
1999	Best Comedy Programme or Series	dinnerladies	Nominated
2000	Best Situation Comedy	dinnerladies	Nominated
2001	Best Comedy Programme or Series	Victoria Wood with All the Trimmings	Nominated
2007	Best Actress	Housewife, 49	Won
2007	Best Single Drama	Housewife, 49	Won
2011	Best Single Drama	Eric and Ernie	Nominated

- Victoria Wood: As Seen on TV won the BAFTA for Best Entertainment Programme in 1986, 1987 and 1988; these awards went to the producer, Geoff Posner.
- An Audience With Victoria Wood won the BAFTA for Best Entertainment Programme in 1989; this award went to David G. Hillier.

== Personal life and death ==
Wood married the stage magician Geoffrey Durham in March 1980. They had two children: Grace, born 1 October 1988 and Henry, born 2 May 1992. The couple separated in October 2002 and divorced in 2005, but continued to live near one another and were on good terms. Henry made a cameo performance as a teenager in Victoria Wood's Mid Life Christmas. He also appeared in the accompanying 'behind the scenes' programme Victoria Wood: What Larks!. Both children had already made appearances as extras on Victoria Wood with All the Trimmings in 2000.

Wood attended Quaker meetings with her husband and was a vegetarian, once remarking, "I'm all for killing animals and turning them into handbags; I just don't want to have to eat them."

Wood received a diagnosis of oesophageal cancer in late 2015, but kept her illness largely private. She died on 20 April 2016 at her Highgate home, in the presence of her children and sister Rosalind. Her funeral was conducted by a humanist celebrant at Golders Green Crematorium on 4 May 2016. A memorial service was held at St James, Piccadilly on 4 July 2016.

== Tributes ==
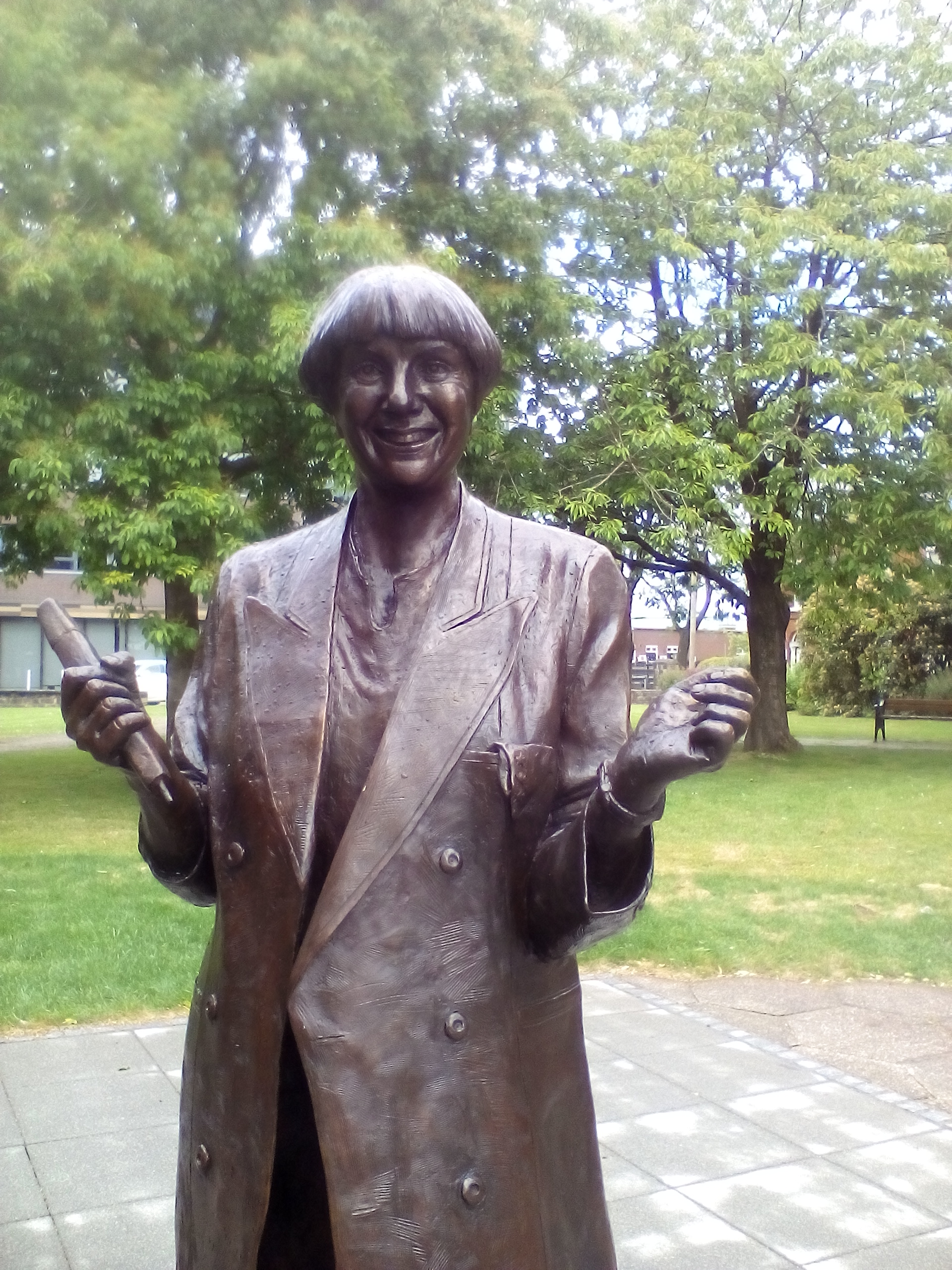
Statue in Library Gardens, Bury.

On 15 May 2016, ITV broadcast Let's Do It: A Tribute to Victoria Wood. In 2017, Wood was the subject of a seven-part show dedicated mainly to extracts from her TV and live work. The main series, titled Our Friend Victoria, aired on BBC One between 11 April and 9 May and concluded later in the year with a Christmas special on 23 December 2017. The seven episodes were presented by Julie Walters, Richard E. Grant, Michael Ball, Maxine Peake, The League of Gentlemen, Daniel Rigby and Anne Reid. On 17 May 2019, a statue of Wood was unveiled in her home town of Bury in Lancashire.

The Old Laundry theatre in Windermere was renamed the Victoria Wood Theatre in her memory. Wood had been a trustee of the theatre. A musical containing Wood's songs, Fourteen again, premiered at the theatre. The musical is based on a book by Tom MacRae.

In May 2023 and on what would have been Wood's 70th birthday, Birmingham Repertory Theatre announced the launch of the Victoria Wood Playwriting Prize for Comedy in partnership with The Victoria Wood Foundation and with support from BBC Comedy. It was billed as "first ever major playwrighting [sic] prize dedicated to the art of Comedy" and had a cash prize of £25,000 Judges included actors Siobhán McSweeney and Daniel Rigby and writer Tanika Gupta. In May 2024, the winner was announced as Portugal by Eugene O'Hare.

== Bibliography ==
- Brandwood, Neil (2002). Victoria Wood : the biography. London: Virgin Books. ISBN 1-85227-982-6. OCLC 820130497.
- Rees, Jasper (October 2020). Let's Do It: the Authorised Biography of Victoria Wood. London: Trapeze. ISBN 978-1409184102. OCLC 1226752410.
- Christopher Foote Wood. Victoria Wood Comedy Genius - Her Life and Work, (2016) Published by The Memoir Club, 07552086888, ISBN 978-1-84104-596-2 OCLC 964380355
- Christopher Foote Wood. Nellie's book : the early life of Victoria Wood's mother, with Nellie Wood (co-author), The History Press (2006), ISBN 978-0-7509-4180-8 OCLC 62344119
