= Peter Ellis (actor) =

British actor (born 1936)

- Born: 30 May 1936 (age 90); Bristol, England
- Occupation: Actor
- Years active: 1962–2023
- Notable work: The Bill
- Spouse: Anita Parry (m. 1997)
- Children: 2

Peter Ellis (born 30 May 1936) is an English actor who has worked in theatre and television. He is perhaps best known for playing the role of Chief Superintendent Charles Brownlow in the long running ITV drama The Bill. Has also appeared as a semi-regular in Emmerdale Farm and Coronation Street. Other series include Sam Lyttons Diary, Edward and Mrs Simpson, The XYY Man, Nolan, The Les Dawson Show, Victoria Wood's play Talent for Granada and Acorn Antiques for BBC TV. He appeared in the David Mercer television play In Two Minds (1967), a work which was directed by Ken Loach. Ellis also appeared as a Jury Foreman in Granada Television’s daytime legal drama series Crown Court, the case of Regina v Vennings & Vennings.

He spent four seasons with the Royal Shakespeare Company, as well as five years at the Crucible Theatre in Sheffield, and three years with the Old Vic Company which included playing Benvolio in Zeffirelli's Romeo and Juliet, Hotspur in Henry IV, Part 1 and later Rosencrantz in a world tour of Hamlet starring Derek Jacobi. He also played Guildenstern in Hamlet on the site of the new Globe Theatre. In the West End, he appeared in The Tulip Tree and in Ray Cooney's Funny Money.

In 1981, Ellis appeared as a police officer in the horror film An American Werewolf in London. In 1983, he appeared in the play Trafford Tanzi, starring Toyah Willcox, at the Mermaid Theatre in London.

Ellis was a regular cast member of The Bill from the first series in 1984 until 2000 when he left the series. His last episode was written by his son Hugh Ellis, He returned to The Bill in 2002 for a guest appearance. He also appeared in Hugh's film The Mortician's Tea Party playing Jed.

Ellis played the title role in The Mikado, Carl Rosa's opera tour of Australia.

Ellis played Mr Bennet opposite Susan Hampshire in a Bath Theatre tour of Pride and Prejudice, and Sorin in the Bristol Old Vic production of The Seagull. More recently, Ellis directed his wife Anita Parry in the comedy drama What Would Helen Mirren Do? for the Edinburgh Festival 2010.

In 2011, he played Adam/Corin in Shakespeare's As You Like It at the Royal Exchange Theatre, Manchester. Ellis has also appeared in Hindle Wakes at the Finbourgh Theatre.

In 2018, Ellis starred in For King & Country at the Southwark Playhouse.

== Works ==
=== Television ===
Year	Title	Role	Notes
1962	BBC Sunday-Night Play	Robert	Episode: "Loyalties"
1962	Romeo and Juliet	Benvolio	Mini-series
1962	The Caucasian Chalk Circle	Trooper	3 episodes
1962	Call Oxbridge 2000	Second Ticket Collector	Episode: #2.10
1963–1964	First Night	Various	3 episodes
1963–1964	No Hiding Place	Various	3 episodes
1965	Dixon of Dock Green	Mike Egan	Episode: "Act of Violence"
1966	The Saint	Patrick	Episode: "Little Girl Lost"
1967	The Wednesday Play	Jake	Episode: "In Two Minds"
1967	NET Playhouse	Norman	Episode: "Acquit or Hang!"
1967	Sanctuary	Detective Blake	Episode: "The Autumn Campaign"
1968–1979	How We Used to Live	Various	18 episodes
1969–1976	Hadleigh	Taylor Photographer	2 episodes
1970	Armchair Theatre	Colin	Episode: "The World in a Room"
1971	The Expert	Inspector Wallace	Episode: "The Coat"
1972	The Shadow of the Tower	Officer of the Guard	Episode: "The Schooling of Apes"
1972	Z Cars	Reg Morris	Episode: "Takes All Sorts"
1972	Crown Court	Jury Foreman	3 episodes
1972–1980	Coronation Street	Various	9 episodes
1973	All Our Saturdays	Andy	Episode: "100 Years of Outstanding Underthings"
1973	Sam	Bagueley	2 episodes
1973–1979	Emmerdale Farm	Stan Buster Stevens	6 episodes
1974	My Old Man	2nd Customer	Episode: #1.2
1974	Justice	Reporter	Episode: "The Fine Line of Duty"
1974	Soldier and Me	Police Constable	Episode: "The House of Secrets"
1974	Oh No It's Selwyn Froggitt	Milkman	Episode: "Oh No- It's Selwyn Froggit"
1975	Nightingale's Boys	Cricket Spectator	Episode: "Big Sid"
1975	The Loner	Ernie	Episode: "Dawson's Connection"
1975	The Main Chance	Towers	Episode: "Year of the Tiger"
1975	The Nearly Man	Barman	Episode: "Reshuffle: June 1975"
1976	Bill Brand	Pru	2 episodes
1976	Heydays Hotel	George	Television film
1976–1977	The XYY Man	Barman Trevor	4 episodes
1977	Sister Dora	Man in street	Episode: "Episode Two"
1978	Play for Today	Young Left-Wing Councillor	Episode: "The Spongers"
1978	Send in the Girls	A.A. Man	Episode: "Goosepimples"
1978	The Look	Sergeant	Television film
1978	Edward & Mrs. Simpson	Osborne	4 episodes
1979	A Deadly Game	Maitre d'Hotel	Television film
1982	The Gentle Touch	Sergeant	Episode: "Black Fox, White Vixen"
1982	The Brack Report	Lecturer	Episode: "Chapter 1"
1983	The Outsider	Jack Stoddart	Episode: "A Death in the Family"
1984	All the World's a Stage	Reading from the 1572 Act of Parliament	Episode: "A Muse of Fire"
1984	Who Dares Wins		Episode: #1.6
1984–2002	The Bill	Charles Brownlow	397 episodes
1985	Screen Two	Whitehall PPS	Episode: "Knockback: Part Two"
1985	Lytton's Diary	Deputy Editor Charles	4 episodes
1985–1986	Victoria Wood: As Seen on TV	Jerez Martinez	2 episodes
1986	First Among Equals	Tom Gould	4 episodes
2005	Bad Girls	Father Kelly	Episode: #7.6
2016–2017	The Crown	Sandringham Gamekeeper Land Agent	3 episodes
2023	Archie	Elias Leach	2 episodes

=== Film ===
Year	Title	Role	Notes
1979	Repeater	Workman	
1981	An American Werewolf in London	Bobby in Trafalgar Square	
1982	Remembrance	Policeman	
1986	Foreign Body	Bus conductor	
2003	Movies	Peter	
2005	The Toybox	The Vicar	
2015	An Old Spark	Gerald	Short film

Recent theatre credits include:

- Mr Bennett – in Pride & Prejudice for Bath Theatre Royal and tour
- Sorin – The Seagull, Bristol Old Vic
- Gracechurch in Topless Mum at the Tobacco Factory, Bristol
- The Magistrate in Puntilla and his man Mattie – Coventry Belgrade Theatre,
- The Muralist in The Hidden City – Part Exchange Theatre, Plymouth
- Director – Fen, Cygnet New Theatre, Exeter

Other theatre: West End

- Trafford Tanzi
- Funny Money – Ray Cooney
- The Tulip Tree

Ellis has spent time with:

- Old Vic (4 seasons)
- RSC (4 seasons)
- Crucible, Sheffield (5 seasons)
- West Yorkshire Playhouse, Leeds
- Birmingham Rep
- Nottingham Playhouse

Ellis has toured with:

- Prospect
- Belt and Braces
- Temba

Ellis has also worked extensively in radio, mainly for BBC Radio 4.

In 2012, he toured the UK in a production of The Cemetery Club alongside Anne Charleston, Anita Harris and Shirley-Anne Field.
