= Deborah Grant =

English actress (born 1947)

- Born: Deborah Jane Snelling; 22 February 1947 (age 79); Perivale, Middlesex, England
- Education: Royal Central School of Speech and Drama
- Occupation: Actress
- Years active: 1967–2023
- Spouse: Jeremy Child (m. 1971; div. 1976)
- Children: 1

Deborah Jane Grant (born Deborah Jane Snelling; 22 February 1947) is an English actress. Between 1981 and 1991, she played Deborah Bergerac in the BBC television detective series Bergerac. From 2007 to 2023, she appeared in the sitcom Not Going Out as Wendy Adams, the mother of Tim (Tim Vine) and Lucy (Sally Bretton).

== Early life ==
Grant was born Deborah Jane Snelling, in Perivale, Middlesex, to Henrietta (née Finn) and Henry Percival Snelling, on 22 February 1947.

Grant trained at the Central School of Speech and Drama and appeared on stage at the Bristol Old Vic and in the West End of London.

== Career ==
Grant had a successful television acting career.

== Personal life ==
Grant became Lady Child in 1971 when she married the baronet and actor Sir Jeremy Child, with whom she had a daughter.

== Filmography ==
=== Film ===
Year	Title	Role	Notes
1972	I Want What I Want	(unknown)	
1973	Don't Be Like Brenda	Brenda (uncredited)	Short film
1989	Scandal	Valerie Profumo	
1995	Les Anges gardiens	(unknown)	English title: Guardian Angels
2016	London Has Fallen	Doris	
2022	York Witches' Society	Christine	

=== Television ===
Year	Title	Role	Notes
1967	Love Story	Receptionist	Episode: "A Merry Chinese Christmas"
1969	ITV Sunday Night Theatre	Marie Holdsworth	Episode: "Moonlight on the Highway"
1969	The Power Game	Jill	3 episodes (series 3)
1969	Judge Dee	Madame Amber Kou	Episode: "A Festival of Death"
1969	Public Eye	Rosemary	Episode: "A Fixed Address"
1969	The Root of All Evil?	Monique	Episode: "What's in It for Me?"
1970	UFO	Linda Simmonds	Episode: "The Psychobombs"
1971	ITV Sunday Night Theatre	Jackie	Episode: "The Chaps"
1975	Edward the Seventh	Alix - Princess Alexandra of Denmark	Mini-series; episodes 4 & 5
1976	Bouquet of Barbed Wire	Sarah Francis	Mini-series; episodes 2–7
1976	Clayhanger	Manna Host	Episode: "The Discovery"
1977	Another Bouquet	Sarah Roberts (née Francis)	Mini-series; episodes 1–7
1979	Danger UXB	Elspeth	Episode: "Dead Letter"
1980	The Dick Emery Show	Various characters	Episode: #17.2
1980	Minder	Lady Ingrave	Episode: "You Gotta Have Friends..."
1980	Play for Today	Louise Day	Episode: "C2H50H"
1981	Partners	Hotel Receptionist	Episode: "Conventional Behaviour"
1981–1991	Bergerac	Deborah	31 episodes (series 1–9)
1982	Outside Edge	Ginnie	Television film
1983	All for Love	Gillian	Episode: "Mrs. Silly"
1984	Crown Court	Jean Thomson	3 episodes: "The Son of His Father: Parts 1–3"
1984–1985	Mr. Palfrey of Westminster	Yelena	Episodes: "The Defector", "Official Secret"
1985	Bulman	Sue Lawson	Episode: "Pandora's Many Boxes"
1985–1987	Victoria Wood: As Seen on TV	Various characters	4 episodes
1986–1988	Room at the Bottom	Celia Pagett-Smythe	11 episodes (series 1 & 2)
1987	Pulaski	Jane	Episodes: "The Fictional Detective", "And the Killer of Rose Amelia Bonner"
1987	Casualty	Lucinda Arthur	Episode: "These Things Happen"
1988	Dramarama	Evelyn	Episode: "Now You See Them"
1988	The Beiderbecke Connection	Chief Superintendent Blake	Mini-series; episode 4
1989	Storyboard	Greta	Episode: "Making News"
1989	Mother Love	Helena's Mother	Mini-series; episode 1
1989	Victoria Wood	Jane	Episode: "Staying In"
1990	Medics	Julia Torrance	Episode: "Alex"
1990–1991	Bread	Leonora Campbell	19 episodes (series 6 & 7)
1993	Westbeach	Sarah Preston	10 episodes
1994	Screen One	Stella Kincaid	Episode: "Pat and Margaret"
1994	Brum	WPC Truncheon	4 episodes (series 2)
1995	Crown Prosecutor	Sheila Cody	10 episodes
1996	Mike & Angelo	Mary-Ann Mudge - Lady Caller	Episode: "Good Morning, Cricklewood"
1998	Jonathan Creek	Antonia Stangerson	Episode: "Time Waits for Norman"
1998	Space Island One	Professor E. Weaver	Episode: "Crew Test"
1998	Roger Roger	Mrs. Mountjoy	Episode: "The Day the Music Died"
1999	Roger Roger	Muriel	Episode: "Love Rules the Heart, Money Takes the Soul"
2000	The Thing About Vince...	Anthea Turton	Mini-series; episode 3
2000–2001	Bob Martin	Paula	5 episodes (series 1 & 2)
2000–2002	Peak Practice	Carol Johnson - Receptionist	44 episodes (series 9–12)
2003	Casualty	Sheila Granger	Episodes: "Hitting Home: Parts 1 & 2"
2003	Doctors	Gwen Ironside	Episode: "Out on Loan"
2006	Doctors	Jennifer Ashe	Episode: "Crossed Wires"
2007	Diamond Geezer	Deborah Baxter	Mini-series; episode 3: "Old School Lies"
2007–2023	Not Going Out	Wendy Adams	31 episodes (series 2–13)
2008	Doctors	Clarissa Cummings	Episode: "Aladdin's Cave"
2008	Mutual Friends	Kathleen	Episode: #1.6
2009	Holby City	Lindsey Morton	Episodes: "Proceed with Caution", "The Professionals"
2013	Doctors	Jenny Florin	Episode: "Where Are We Going?"
2014	Casualty	Sarah Pilkington	Episode: "Bad Timing"
2016	Doctors	Clarissa Thomas	Episode: "Professor Pickering"

== Theatre ==
- Barnum (London Palladium, 1981)
