= Duncan Preston =

English actor (born 1946)

- Born: 11 August 1946 (age 79); Bradford, West Riding of Yorkshire, England
- Occupation: Actor
- Years active: 1964–2025
- Television: Surgical Spirit (1989–1995) dinnerladies (1998–2000); Emmerdale (2007–2011, 2014–2020)
- Spouse: Susan Penhaligon (m. 1986; div. 1992)
- Partner: Susan Penhaligon (1997–2025)

Duncan Preston (born 11 August 1946) is an English actor. He is known for his appearances in television productions written by Victoria Wood, including his role in the soap opera parody sketches Acorn Antiques and as Stan in the sitcom dinnerladies (1998–2000). He reprised his role of Clifford in Acorn Antiques: The Musical! in 2005. His other television roles include DS Todd in the soap opera EastEnders (1987), Dr. Jonathan Haslam in the hospital sitcom Surgical Spirit (1989–1995); and Doug Potts in the soap opera Emmerdale (2007–2011, 2014–2020).

== Career ==
Preston appeared in a short 1981 Public information film entitled Say NO! to Strangers, as a kerb-crawling predator attempting to lure a schoolgirl into his car. He has also made many guest appearances in various television series, including Hunters Walk, Secret Army, The Professionals, All Creatures Great and Small, Robin of Sherwood, Bergerac, The New Statesman, Press Gang, Chalk, Boon, Casualty, Heartbeat, The Royal, Holby City, The Good Ship Murder, Peak Practice, Midsomer Murders, Dalziel and Pascoe and My Family. His film career includes roles in Porridge (1979), A Nightingale Sang in Berkeley Square (1979), Scandalous (1984), Milk (1999), Nativity 3: Dude, Where's My Donkey? (2014) and in the horror film Howl (2015).

Between 1989 to 1995, he had a regular role as Dr. Jonathan Haslam in Surgical Spirit and appeared as Dennis Stokes in Coronation Street in 2004. Preston played Doug Potts, the father of Laurel Thomas in Emmerdale. He has also appeared on Lily Savage's Blankety Blank.

From 2002 to 2012, Preston co-starred as Det. Sgt. Riley in the BBC Radio crime drama Trueman and Riley, opposite Robert Daws.

In 2022, Preston appeared in two episodes of Silent Witness as DI Johnny Campbell.

== Selected Filmography ==
Year	Title	Role	Notes
1973 – 1976	Hunter's Walk	PC Fred Pooley	39 episodes
1975	Thriller	Groom	Episode: "Night is the Time for Killing"
1978	The Professionals	Karl Drake	Episode: "Not a Very Civil Servant"
1979	Porridge	Weatherman	Film
1979	Secret Army	Jacques Gavain/ Prison Guard	4 episodes
1980	All Creatures Great and Small	Sep Gibbons	Episode: "Charity Begins at Home"
1980	A Nightingale Sang in Berkeley Square	Police Car Driver	Film
1982	Shine on Harvey Moon	Fireman	Episode: "Safe as Houses"
1982	Wood and Walters	Various	1 episodes
1984	A Passage to India	Club Member (uncredited)	Film
1984	Robin of Sherwood	Heinrich von Erlichausen	Episode: "Seven Poor Knights from Acre"
1984	Scandalous	Hal	Film
1985	Bergerac	Paul	Episode: Chrissie
1985	That's My Boy	Mr Braithwaite	Episode: "What Seems to be the Trouble?"
1985 – 1987	Victoria Wood: As Seen on TV	Various	13 episodes
1986	The Bill	Freezer Bob Miller	Episode: "Loan Shark"
1987	EastEnders	DS Todd	3 episodes
1987	Hardwicke House	Moose Magnusson	7 episodes
1989	The New Statesman	Floor Manager	Episode: "Live from Westminster"
1989	Press Gang	Douglas Homer	Episode: Interface
1989	Victoria Wood	Captain (voice)	Episode: "We'd Quite Like to Apologise"
1989 – 1995	Surgical Spirit	Dr. Jonathan Haslam	50 episodes
1991	Boon	Mr. Stainrod	Episode: "When Harry Met Janice"
1991	Spatz	Peter Jonathan	Episode: "Loot"
1992	Take Off with T-Bag	Phantom/ Fritz	Episode: "Phantom of the Opera"
1994	Harry Enfield & Chums	Kevin's Dad	4 episodes
1994	Screen One	Jim	Episode: "Pat and Margaret"
1995	Coogan's Run	Jeremy/ Angela Monkhead	Episode: "Natural Born Quizzers"
1997	Chalk	J.F. Kennedy	6 episodes
1998	Noah's Ark	Reverend Thomas	Episode: "Stormy Weather"
1998 – 2000	dinnerladies	Stan Meadowcroft	16 episodes
1999	Holby City	David Cousins	Episode: "Take Me With You"
1999	Midsomer Murders	Colin Cooper	Episode: "Dead Man's Eleven"
1999	Milk	Sergeant Wilson	Film
2000	The Bill	Vernon Turner	Episode: "On the Wagon"
2000	Casualty	James Oliver	Episode: "Too Tight to Mention"
2000	Doctors	Owen Barrett	Episode: "A Stranger in the Family"
2000	Heartbeat	Don Foster	Episode: "Chalk and Cheese"
2000	My Family	Bernard	Episode: "The Last Resort"
2000	Peak Practice	Martin Wilson	Episode: "Playing God"
2001	Dalziel and Pascoe	Ken Crowley	Episode: "Wall of Silence"
2001	Merseybeat	Phil Scott	Episode: "Step by Step
2001	Randall & Hopkirk (Deceased)	Dr. Hickman	Episode: "Painkillers"
2003	Born and Bred	Colin Pinkerton	Episode: "The Magnificent Colin"
2003	The Royal	John Rutter	Episode: "First Impressions"
2004	Coronation Street	Dennis Stokes	12 episodes
2004	Five Children and It	Sergeant	Film
2005	Down to Earth	Harry Powell	Episode: "Say Hello, Say Goodbye"
2005	Murder in Suburbia	Walter Archer	Episode: "Estate Agents"
2006	Acorn Antiques: The Musical!	Clifford	Video
2006	Holby City	Gerald Payne	Episode: "Passing Out"
2007 – 2020	Emmerdale	Douglas Potts	868 episodes
2013	Love & Marriage	Ken Paradise	6 episodes
2013	Moving On	Tommy	Episode: "The House"
2014	Nativity 3: Dude, Where's My Donkey?	Sophie's Dad	Film
2015	Howl	Ged	Film
2022	Silent Witness	DI Johnny Campbell	2 episodes
2023	Midsomer Murders	William Fleming	Episode: "Claws Out"
2024	All Creatures Great and Small	Enoch Sykes	Episode: "All God's Creatures"
2025	The Good Ship Murder	Hugo Lawrance-Batley	Episode: "Athens"

== Personal life ==
Preston was married to actress Susan Penhaligon between 1986 and 1992. Duncan has supported the Bradford Bulls Rugby League team throughout his life, having first attended a game when he was 3 years old.

== Stage work ==
As a Shakespearean actor, Preston has performed in many productions for the Royal Shakespeare Company, including playing Angus in Trevor Nunn's version of Macbeth (stage 1976, television 1978), starring Ian McKellen and Judi Dench. Other theatre work includes a 2006 production of To Kill A Mockingbird as Atticus Finch.

He was awarded an honorary Doctor of Letters degree by the University of Bradford on 4 December 2002 "for his contributions as an actor".
