= Nearly a Happy Ending =

- Opening title
- Genre: Comedy
- Created by: Victoria Wood
- Directed by: Baz Taylor
- Starring: Victoria Wood; Julie Walters
- Country of origin: United Kingdom
- No. of series: 1
- No. of episodes: 1

Production
- Producer: Peter Eckersley
- Running time: 66 minutes

Original release
- Network: ITV
- Release: 1 June 1980

Nearly A Happy Ending is a television play written by Victoria Wood, which ITV broadcast on 1 June 1980.

It is a sequel to Wood's earlier play Talent, with the same lead characters: Julie (played by Julie Walters) and Maureen (played by Wood); although some minor plot points from Talent are either ignored or contradicted in this play.

According to the BFI's Screenonline website, the plot concerns "Maureen's ill-fated attempts to lose her virginity at a dismal salesmen's party in a Manchester hotel".

== Cast ==
- Victoria Wood as Maureen
- Julie Walters as Julie
- Paul Seed as Tony
- Rosemary Williams as Madge
- Freddie Fletcher as Tim
- Mike Kelly as Ken
- Christopher Godwin as Barman
- Peter Martin as Les Dickey
- Jill Summers as Attendant
- Roger Brierley as A.J. Germany
- Patricia Roe as Evelyn (as Pat Roe)
- Johnnie Tweed as Accountant (as Johnny Tweed)
- The Square Pegs as Businessmen Quartet
- Rebecca Storm as Tina
- Bert Oxley as Taxi Driver
- Pamela Austin as Slimmers' Chorus
- Julie Bennett as Slimmers' Chorus
- Brenda Castle as Slimmers' Chorus
- Helen Dean as Slimmers' Chorus
- Lorna Doone as Slimmers' Chorus
- Doreen Driver as Slimmers' Chorus
- Paula Greca as Slimmers' Chorus
- Norma Hardy as Slimmers' Chorus
- Lola Morice as Slimmers' Chorus
- Hazel Sutton as Slimmers' Chorus
