= Victoria Wood's Mid Life Christmas =

2009 British television comedy sketch programme

- Genre: Comedy
- Created by: Victoria Wood
- Directed by: Tony Dow
- Starring: Victoria Wood; Julie Walters; Anton Du Beke; Delia Smith; Jayne Torvill; Christopher Dean; Reece Shearsmith; Emily Atack; Tony Maudsley
- Country of origin: United Kingdom

Production
- Executive producer: Victoria Wood
- Producer: John Rushton
- Running time: 60 minutes

Original release
- Network: BBC One
- Release: 24 December 2009

Related
- Victoria Wood: What Larks! Or... What I Did on My Holidays; Victoria Wood As Seen On TV

Victoria Wood's Mid Life Christmas is a comedy sketch show written by and starring comedian Victoria Wood, broadcast on Christmas Eve 2009.

The programme, Wood's first sketch show for nine years, was described by Wood as being "a whole night's telly crammed into one hour". The special featured a spoof documentary titled Beyond The Marigolds, in which Wood's long-time collaborator Julie Walters reprised her role as "Bo Beaumont", the actress behind Acorn Antiques character "Mrs. Overall". Beyond The Marigolds saw Beaumont's foray into the world of celebrity programming such as I'm a Celebrity...Get Me Out of Here!, Dancing on Ice and Strictly Come Dancing. The sketch included special guest appearances from Delia Smith, Jayne Torvill and Christopher Dean, and Anton Du Beke. Sylvestra Le Touzel, Dorothy Atkinson, Marcia Warren, Harriet Thorpe, Jason Watkins, Reece Shearsmith, Richard Lintern and Lorraine Ashbourne also had roles.

Also featured in Mid Life Christmas was The Mid Life Olympics 2009, a series of sketches that include events such as the "4 by 400 Hedge Trimming" and "Ladies Outdoor Parking", featuring Wood and Bob Cryer as the presenters.

The programme achieved a total viewing audience of 7.45 million viewers and was the 12th highest rated show on BBC One and the 17th highest rated across all channels for the week ending 27 December 2009.

Contemporary and later press reports suggested that Wood was unhappy with the BBC's decision to schedule the programme for Christmas Eve rather than on Christmas Day as she had expected.
