= Acorn Antiques =

British TV comedy series by Victoria Wood (1985–1987)

Julie Walters (Mrs Overall), Victoria Wood (Berta), Rosie Collins (Trixie) and Celia Imrie (Miss Babs) in Acorn Antiques (1986).

Acorn Antiques is a soap opera parody created by British comedian Victoria Wood. It appeared as a recurring sketch in the two series of Victoria Wood: As Seen on TV, broadcast from 1985 to 1987. Wood later developed the concept into a stage musical, which premiered in 2005.

== Television version ==
Wood originally wrote Acorn Antiques as a recurring segment in her sketch series Victoria Wood: As Seen on TV. The format was inspired by the British soap operas Crossroads and Waggoners’ Walk.

The series focused on the daily lives of the staff of an antiques shop in the fictional English town of Manchesterford, parodying the melodramatic plots and stylistic conventions typical of British soap operas, such as love triangles, amnesia, unexpected deaths, and long-lost relatives.

The dialogue was intentionally mundane and poorly written, often including overt references to ongoing storylines. The production satirised the technical and narrative limitations of low-budget serial dramas through its simple studio sets, visible production errors, rudimentary camera work, and abrupt plot inconsistencies. Storylines were frequently introduced and dropped without resolution. One episode, for instance, revolved around the shop’s conversion into a "leisure centre and sunbed centre" which was never referred to again. This plotline echoed similar developments in Crossroads during the 1980s, when a leisure centre was introduced into its setting.

The title sequences and music of Acorn Antiques also directly parodied Crossroads. In the first series, Acorn Antiques replicated the long-standing Crossroads opening, in which the programme began directly within the first scene, showing the actors in silence until the theme music ended. The second series imitated the later Crossroads format, which featured a dedicated opening credit sequence with a revised theme tune and a title card revealed as vertical blinds closed. In the Acorn Antiques version, the blinds malfunctioned, requiring a visible stagehand to push them manually. The closing credits deliberately misspelled the creator’s name as "Victoria Woods".

A recurring comic device was the inclusion of missed cues, reminiscent of early soap opera broadcasts. Off-screen voices of fictional production staff could often be heard prompting hesitant actors, and scenes sometimes ended with performers left uncertain of how to react as the camera continued recording. Other elements of television production were also parodied, including mock continuity announcements promoting travelling exhibitions of costumes, tie-in novelisations, and a fictional single of the programme's theme tune, Anyone Can Break a Vase, performed by Miss Babs. The latter referenced EastEnders actor Anita Dobson’s 1986 single Anyone Can Fall in Love, a vocal adaptation of the EastEnders theme tune.

Wood also produced a mockumentary for a Victoria Wood: As Seen on TV special imitating behind-the-scenes programmes about soap operas. The segment depicted a chaotic production environment and featured interviews with the fictional actors behind the Acorn Antiques characters. In one scene, the producer Marion Clune (played by Maggie Steed) dismisses a continuity error by remarking, "We professionals notice – Joe Public never clocks a damn thing". The documentary also portrayed the actress playing Mrs Overall as a demanding soap star named Bo Beaumont.

In the final episode of Victoria Wood: As Seen on TV, a sketch depicted the supposed dismissal of Mrs Overall and Mr Clifford from the soap, with Bo Beaumont parodying Noele Gordon’s real-life dismissal from Crossroads.

The parody briefly returned in 1992 in Wood’s All Day Breakfast, where a sketch about another fictional soap opera called The Mall concluded with Mrs Overall reopening Acorn Antiques, despite her character’s prior death, and mentioning that the other principal characters had been killed in a bus crash. The concept was revisited again in 1996 for a BBC Television 60th anniversary special and once more in 2001, with the original cast joined by Nick Frost as an armed robber, as part of Wood’s History of Sketch Comedy series.

The sketches gained a cult following, inspiring fan gatherings and a fanzine. In 2004, Channel 4 ranked Acorn Antiques seventh in a poll of the greatest comedy sketches of all time.

== Episode guide ==
=== Series 1 ===
DVD title	As Seen On TV Show	Description
Think On and Look Sharp	Series 1, Episode 1	Things come in threes: one death, one break up, and one coffee without a sweetener.
Shot in Dakar	Series 1, Episode 2	Shop co-owner Berta returns from intensive care to find that her father is still alive.
Trixie Trouble	Series 1, Episode 3	Shop worker Trixie causes trouble when she finds out that she is Babs' daughter.
Cousin Jerez	Series 1, Episode 4	Cousin Jerez sparks a suspicious interest in Acorn Antiques.
Muesli	Series 1, Episode 5	Clifford reveals that he and Berta are married.
Twins	Series 1, Episode 6	Mrs Overall finds out that she is mother of both Derek and Miss Berta.

=== Series 2 ===
DVD title	As Seen On TV Show	Description
Up For Sale	Series 2, Episode 1	Miss Babs decides to put Acorn Antiques up for sale.
All's Well That Ends Well	Series 2, Episode 2	Mrs Overall reveals that she never posted the letter to the estate agent.
Drastic Refurbishment	Series 2, Episode 3	The shop begins its refurbishment.
Health and Fitness	Series 2, Episode 4	Acorn Antiques is turned into a Leisure Centre.
Shocking News	Series 2, Episode 5	Clifford reveals a secret about him and Derek.
The Final Performance	Series 2, Episode 6	Mrs Overall and Clifford die.

== Musical ==
In 2005, Victoria Wood created a stage musical adaptation of Acorn Antiques. The production reunited original cast members Julie Walters, Celia Imrie, and Duncan Preston, while Sally Ann Triplett replaced Wood in the role of Berta, alternating with Walters as Mrs Overall. Josie Lawrence and Neil Morrissey joined the cast as new characters. Directed by Trevor Nunn, the original West End run was a commercial success, selling out its season and earning multiple Laurence Olivier Award nominations; Celia Imrie won the award for Best Supporting Actress in a Musical.

The musical was revived for a national tour in 2007, this time directed by Victoria Wood herself.

Its narrative follows the fictional actors from Acorn Antiques—as depicted in The Making of Acorn Antiques—reuniting for a gritty stage revival of the original soap opera. Within the "musical-within-a-musical", characters Babs, Berta, and Mrs Overall resist a corporate takeover by the head of an international coffee chain. Their situation changes when Miss Bonnie, played by Josie Lawrence, is revealed to be their sister and Mrs Overall their mother.

In keeping with the original television series, the stage musical is intentionally presented as derivative and amateurish, featuring mistimed cues, erratic choreography, and abrupt tonal shifts. It also parodies well-known elements from popular musicals such as Blood Brothers, Chicago, and Les Misérables.

Since its premiere, Acorn Antiques: The Musical! has been performed by several amateur theatre groups. The first amateur production was staged in 2010 at the Crescent Theatre in Birmingham, followed later that year by The Leighton Masqueraders. Victoria Wood attended the Birmingham opening. In 2016, Wigston Amateur Operatic Society presented their own production at The Little Theatre in Leicester.

== Cast ==
- Miss Babs (Celia Imrie): the emotionally volatile and romantically troubled owner of Acorn Antiques. Each episode typically opens with her on the telephone introducing a plot that is not subsequently revisited. She is married to the unseen Mr Kenneth, with whom she has unnamed triplets, and is later revealed to be the mother of Trixie Trouble. Miss Babs had a past relationship with Mr Clifford, who frequently seeks to renew their acquaintance.
- Miss Berta (Victoria Wood): co-owner of Acorn Antiques. She first appears recovering from intensive care, learning that her supposedly deceased father has been sighted alive. Over the course of the series she experiences amnesia, marries Clifford, and discovers she is both Derek’s twin and Mrs Overall’s daughter, as well as the mother of an unnamed baby. In the stage musical adaptation, Miss Berta and Miss Babs are revealed to be sisters, both daughters of Mrs Overall.
- Clifford (Duncan Preston): a dependable male leading man whose renewed romantic interest in Miss Babs is unreciprocated after returning from Zürich in the first episode. He later marries Miss Berta during her period of amnesia. His speech style parodies that of David Hunter from Crossroads, as portrayed by Ronald Allen. In the final As Seen on TV sketch, he dies by accidental electrocution.
- Mrs Overall (Julie Walters): the elderly tea lady at Acorn Antiques. She is revealed to be the mother of Miss Berta and Derek. The fictional actress playing Mrs Overall is Bo Beaumont. In the final sketch of As Seen on TV, the character dies after choking on a macaroon. According to Victoria Wood, Mrs Overall was inspired by the characters Mary Mack from Take the High Road and Amy Turtle from Crossroads.
- Trixie (Rosie Collins): also known as Trixie Trouble, she works in the shop’s packing department and later learns she is Miss Babs’s daughter. Her storyline includes numerous romantic entanglements, including with Derek and possibly Mr Kenneth. She later becomes a nun and eventually a mother superior.
- Derek (Kenny Ireland): the shop’s handyman, subsequently revealed as Miss Berta’s twin brother and Mrs Overall’s son. His storylines involve romantic connections with both Miss Babs and Trixie. Derek and Trixie later travel together to Morocco. The character is a parody of Benny Hawkins from Crossroads, played by Paul Henry. In 2007, Kenny Ireland remarked that he was frequently recognized for this role.
- Cousin Jerez (Peter Ellis): Miss Babs’s Spanish cousin and the principal antagonist. After unsuccessfully attempting to buy the shop, he disguises himself as a postman to intercept important correspondence. His schemes are eventually thwarted by Clifford. He later reappears reformed and donates £25,000 to help the shop’s finances, stating that he is enrolled in a computer science sandwich course at a polytechnic in Fuengirola.
- Customers (Albert Welch and Michaela Welch): an elderly couple appearing as silent extras in every episode, typically browsing or exiting the shop.

== Home media ==
A DVD containing Acorn Antiques as a full-length individual release was made available in a 20th Anniversary Collection on 7 February 2005. This was the first time that the extras played by Albert Welch and Michaela Welch were given an on-screen credit.

Acorn Antiques was released as part of the complete series of Victoria Wood: As Seen on TV on 2 April 2007.
