= Ahead of the Class =

2005 British television film

- Genre: Drama
- Created by: Marie Stubbs
- Written by: Robert Jones
- Directed by: Adrian Shergold
- Starring: Julie Walters; Reece Dinsdale; Hannah Yelland; Inday Ba; Michelle Fairley; Danny Nussbaum; Tony Slattery; Alan McKenna; Anton Lesser; Adrian Rawlins
- Theme music composer: Paul Heard
- Country of origin: United Kingdom
- Original language: English

Production
- Executive producers: Michael Foster; Simon Heath; Sue Latimer
- Producer: Elli Jason
- Cinematography: David Odd
- Editor: Tania Reddin
- Running time: 94 minutes
- Production companies: ARG TV Ltd. World Productions

Original release
- Network: ITV
- Release: 30 January 2005

Ahead of the Class is a single British television drama film, based on the book of the same name by Marie Stubbs, that first broadcast on ITV on 30 January 2005. Adapted for television by Robert Jones and directed by Adrian Shergold, the film stars Julie Walters as Stubbs, a diminutive Glaswegian headmistress who takes on the challenge of improving the fortunes of St George's Roman Catholic Secondary School in North West London.

Reece Dinsdale and Hannah Yelland are credited as the other two principal cast members, who star as Stubbs' deputies, Sean Devlin and Tracy O'Leary respectively. The film was shot on location at the former Kingsland Secondary School in Dalston, Hackney, London. The film drew 9.6 million viewers on its debut broadcast. The film was nominated for two awards at the Royal Television Society Awards 2006, in the categories of Best Single Drama and Best Actress, for Julie Walters. A DVD of the film was released on 21 May 2007.

== Premise ==
Marie Stubbs is several years short of retirement age. After leaving her role as headteacher at The Douay Martyrs School, Ickenham, she takes over as headmistress at St. George's Roman Catholic Secondary School, which is facing closure due to the decline which began after its previous headmaster, Philip Lawrence, was murdered five years earlier, whilst breaking up a fight between his pupils and students from a rival school. The school is suffering from a multitude of problems, including bullying, gang culture, persistent absence and vandalism. Staff morale is at an all-time low, and Ofsted have placed the school in special measures. Lady Stubbs sets about raising standards and saving the school from closure.

== Cast ==
- Julie Walters as Marie, Lady Stubbs, headteacher
- Reece Dinsdale as Sean Devlin, deputy headteacher
- Hannah Yelland as Tracy O'Leary, deputy headteacher
- Inday Ba as Trudy Gower, teacher
- Michelle Fairley as Sonia Venning, teacher
- Danny Nussbaum as Tomas Moreira, school caretaker
- Tony Slattery as Stuart Stiles, teacher
- Alan McKenna as Simon Linder, teacher
- Anton Lesser as Graham Ranger, Ofsted inspector
- Adrian Rawlins as Tony Mackersie, diocesan representative
- Gerard Canning as Father George Dangerfield, school priest
- Amy Jo Lamb as Debbie Campbell, student
- Frances Gold as Lusha, student
- Callum McNab as Jason Foley, student
- Heshima Thompson as Rory, student
