= Nang! =

Magazine

- The Nang! magazine logo
- Editor: Kamillia Kasbi
- Categories: General Interest
- Frequency: Quarterly
- Publisher: Tower Hamlets Summer Uni
- Founded: 2001
- Country: United Kingdom
- Based in: Aldgate, London
- Language: English
- Website: www.summeruni.org/nang

Nang! is a general interest magazine based in Aldgate, London. Aimed at 14- to 21-year-olds, the magazine is free and is distributed at sixth forms colleges, universities, libraries and Connexions centres in the London area on a quarterly basis. In December 2006, Nang! was presented with one of the Philip Lawrence Awards for services to the local community.

== Background ==
Nang! magazine was created in summer 2001 as a course on Tower Hamlets Summer University's (THSU) summer courses. The course was completely funded by big businesses and other charitable organizations and featured a small group of journalists who came together to create a free magazine that would paint a positive picture of the youth in east London. Featuring local artists and celebrities, the magazine achieved a following in the Tower Hamlets borough. A journalist worked with the youngsters to create a magazine relevant to the youth in Tower Hamlets.

For the 2003 course, THSU brought freelance journalist, Adeline Iziren, on board. Iziren had previously worked on The Voice newspaper and was a regular contributor to the Education and Careers section in The Guardian. She had also had extensive experience in helping groups of young people to create their own magazine.

The magazine continued to grow and soon distribution increased to include the Hackney area and most of east London.

== Quarterly publication ==
Following the release of the 2005 summer issue, THSU announced that it had secured funding to publish Nang! quarterly with Divina Glah as editor-in-chief. The first quarterly issue published in January 2006 featured hip-hop magician Dynamo on the cover and included an interview with local MC, Professor Green, and a feature on Pride of Britain winner, Ashley Huxley. The magazine received positive reviews for its style and relevance to its audience. The Spring 2006 issue featured an interview with former England Head Coach, Sven-Göran Eriksson, just before the World Cup, as well as MOBO winner, Sway DaSafo. Two more issues were released in 2006. The Summer issue featured interviews with rapper and beatboxer, Killa Kella, and X-Men star, Ian McKellen. This was followed by the Autumn/Winter issue featuring Eva Longoria. In summer 2006, the decision was made to re-launch the magazine to a smaller age range, whilst increasing distribution to include the whole of London. The Autumn/Winter 2006 issue was released with Eva Longoria of Desperate Housewives on the cover. For the first time, Nang! magazine contained paid advertisements.

== Financial troubles ==
Despite the popularity of the magazine, its future was put in jeopardy by lack of funds for 2007. The Winter 2007 issue was cancelled and much of the team resigned due to the uncertainty. Six months later, the magazine returned headed by former editor-in-chief, David Gordon.

== Awards ==
=== 2007 : Guardian Student Magazine of the Year Award ===
On 22 November 2007, Nang! magazine was given The Guardian Student Magazine of the Year award.

=== 2007 : TalkTalk Innovation Award ===
Nang! magazine was recognised for its technological ambitions. A cheque for £2000 was awarded as well as free broadband for a year by TalkTalk.

=== 2007 : BT Seen And Heard Award ===
Nang! magazine was rewarded for its positive image in East London by the BT Seen And Heard Awards.

=== 2006 : Philip Lawrence Award ===
On 6 December 2006, Nang! magazine was presented with one of the Philip Lawrence Awards by Sir Trevor McDonald and the Home Secretary, John Reid, at the Bloomsbury Theatre, London. Created in memory of the murdered headteacher by his widow Frances Lawrence, the awards celebrate the achievements of youth groups and organizations in their local area. Nang! and seven other winners each received cheques worth £1,000.

== Rebranding ==
In 2007, the magazine sought to rebrand itself in order to increase its appeal. More serious content was introduced, and there was an increase in celebrity features and fashion. Interviewees varied from Michael Howard to Lethal Bizzle to the editor of The Times.

In January 2008, editor-in-chief, David Gordon, and creative editor, Sanoobar Patel, left Nang! to pursue other projects. Assistant editor, Kamillia Kasbi, took charge.
