= Marie Stubbs =

British educator and academic (born 1939)

Marie Stubbs DSG
- Born: 1939 (age 86–87); Glasgow, Scotland
- Occupations: Headmistress, author
- Known for: Reforming a British secondary school following placement on 'special measures' by Ofsted and supporting better leadership in education.
- Notable work: Ahead of the Class (Book)
- Style: Lady Stubbs
- Spouse: Sir William Stubbs
- Children: 3 daughters
- Website: www.mariestubbs.net

Marie, Lady Stubbs, DSG (born 1939) is a British educator and academic, mostly known for being the headmistress who held headship at The Douay Martyrs School in Ickenham, and then reformed St George's Roman Catholic Secondary School, in Maida Vale, London.

== Career in education ==
=== Early career ===
Marie Margaret Stubbs was born in Glasgow, and became head teacher at Douay Martyrs School in Ickenham. She was also responsible for the running of secure unit for girls in South London.

=== Headmistress of St George's ===
The school had been put on "special measures" by Ofsted, meaning that it was considered to be well below standard and subject to regular inspection. The students had serious behavioural problems and there was low morale among the staff, due in part to the murder of a previous headmaster, Philip Lawrence, who was stabbed to death when intervening in a fight at the school gates.

A new headteacher, Margaret Ryan, was appointed and later resigned. As a result, Lady Stubbs was asked to leave retirement and given a contract of seventeen months to reform the school or it would face closure. Seventeen months after her appointment as headmistress, the school was taken off special measures, once believed to be impossible by some and was no longer considered to be failing.

In regards to Stubbs' term, Paul McGuire of the South China Morning Post wrote "there is little doubt that the single-minded determination of [Stubbs] [...] had a fundamental impact on the school's improvement." McGuire stated that "tension and controversy", with "some of it acted out in the national press" had occurred during Stubbs' term.

=== Second retirement ===
Following her experience at St George's, she wrote the book Ahead of the Class which outlines her time at the school as well as her opinions on the need for good leadership of headteachers in order for schools to succeed. She quoted about education: "You should sit down and decide what makes a good education for the children. Every child should be intrinsically valued." In 2005, ITV made the book into a two-hour drama with Julie Walters in the role of Lady Stubbs.

== Personal life ==
Lady Stubbs has been married to Sir William Stubbs, formerly Head of the QCA, since 1963. The couple divide their time between London and Banbury, Oxfordshire. They have three daughters and six grandchildren.

== Honours ==
- Member of the governing body of De Montfort University, which awarded her an honorary doctorate
- Catholic Woman of the Year (2002)
- Nominated as Scotswoman of the Year (2005)

=== Decorations ===
- :- Dame of the Order of Saint Gregory the Great (DSG)

== Styles ==
- 1963–1994 – Mrs Marie Stubbs
- 1994–present – Marie, Lady Stubbs
