= St George's Catholic School =

St. George’s Catholic School

Location
- Lanark Road; Maida Vale, London, W9 1RB; England
- Coordinates: 51.53296°N 0.18784°W

Information
- Type: Academy
- Religious affiliation: Roman Catholic
- Department for Education URN: 139369 Tables
- Ofsted: Reports
- Head teacher: Martin Tissot
- Gender: Girls, boys
- Age: 11 to 18
- Publication: The Dragon (school magazine, issued termly)
- Website: www.stgeorgesrc.org

St. George's Catholic School is a Roman Catholic secondary school, with academy status, in Maida Vale, Westminster, London, England. The school also offers sixth form education franchised from St Thomas More Catholic School.

== History ==
In 2010, Ofsted stated that "St. George’s has undergone a remarkable transformation and has now confidently emerged from a turbulent period". The school received publicity in 1995 when headmaster Philip Lawrence was fatally stabbed whilst intervening in a fight outside the school gates in order to protect a pupil. His bravery and dedication were commemorated in the Philip Lawrence Awards which recognise young people's achievements in making a positive difference to their communities. His life and work is marked within the school by the Philip Lawrence Friendship Garden. Following Lawrence's death, the school went through many years of difficult transition and appeared as part of the television drama Ahead of the Class which followed the headship of Marie Stubbs.

In regards to Stubbs' term, Paul McGuire of the South China Morning Post wrote "The fact that the school was deemed a national example of good practice after only four terms was a remarkable achievement by any standards."

In 2006 head teacher Martin Tissot joined the staff; he is also now head teacher of St Thomas More Catholic School, Wood Green. In 2009 the school became the fifth most improved school in the country. In 2010 Ofsted inspected the school and it was rated outstanding. The school also gained dual specialisms in business and humanities. In March 2013 the school converted to academy status.

== School performance and inspection judgements ==
The school has one of the highest Value Added scores, measuring how much progress pupils make in England.

In 2013, 55% of pupils achieved five A*-C GCSE grades including English and maths.

The proportion of pupils from minority ethnic groups, with Special Educational Needs (SEN) and those with English as an Additional Language is within the top quintile nationally. The school is also in the highest quintile for pupil deprivation. Despite this context, almost all groups of pupils outperform the average for their group in national examinations.

As of 2021, the school's most recent inspection by Ofsted was in 2014, with a judgement of Outstanding.

== Facilities ==
In 2010, major construction work as part of the Building Schools for the Future programme was completed and the school added the Curran Block. This includes ICT, science and drama facilities as well as a new rooftop sports area.

== Communications ==
The Dragon is the school's magazine. Launched in 2006, and issued termly, it is written by staff and pupils.

== Notable alumni ==
- Peter Egan (born 1946), actor.
- Tokio Myers (born 1984), musician.
