= Murder of Philip Lawrence =

School headmaster (1947–1995)

Philip Ambrose Lawrence, QGM (21 August 1947 – 8 December 1995) was an Irish school headmaster who was stabbed to death outside the gates of his school, St George's Catholic School, Maida Vale, in London, when he went to the aid of a pupil who was being attacked by a gang.

== Biography ==
Lawrence was born the son of a retired Indian Army officer, and grew up in County Wicklow, Ireland. He attended Ampleforth College in Yorkshire, and won an exhibition to read English at Queens' College, Cambridge, graduating BA in 1969 and MA in 1970.

Lawrence began teaching as an English Master at St. Benedict's School, a Roman Catholic independent school in West London. On 10 February 1973, he married Frances Huntley, a fellow teacher at the school, and they had three daughters and a son.

After his time at St. Benedict's, Lawrence moved into the state sector, teaching at Gunnersbury Boys' School in Brentford, St. Mark's School in Hounslow, and Dick Sheppard School in Brixton. In 1993, he became headmaster at St George's Catholic School, Maida Vale, which had been plagued by behavioural issues and academic underperformance. During the two-year period of his headship, the school's exam results and reputation greatly improved.

== Murder ==
The Wo Shing Wo gang, which was mainly Filipino, aspired to be a junior version of the Triads. On 8 December 1995, twelve of the gang's members, led by 15 year-old Learco Chindamo, went to St. George's school intending to "punish" 13 year-old black pupil, William Njoh, who had earlier quarrelled with a Filipino pupil. Chindamo was a pupil at Quintin Kynaston Community Academy who claimed to be a Triad member. Lawrence saw them attack the boy with an iron bar and went outside to remonstrate with the gang. Chindamo punched Lawrence and then stabbed him in the chest. Lawrence, aged 48, died in hospital that evening from his injuries.

Musician and record producer Tokio Myers, who was then an 11 year-old student at Lawrence's school, witnessed the murder.

Chindamo was arrested and charged shortly afterwards. He was convicted of murder at the Old Bailey in October 1996, after a unanimous decision by the jury, and jailed indefinitely (as he was a juvenile at the time). The trial judge recommended that a minimum of 12 years should be served. Although he did not deny that he was present, Chindamo claimed that he was the victim of mistaken identity and that the real killer was another boy who had borrowed his jacket.

During the trial it was shown that Chindamo's claim of links to Chinese Triad society were false. On 10 October 1997, he lost his appeal against the murder conviction. He was also a suspect in the non-fatal stabbing of businessman John Mills during a mugging in Camden several months before Lawrence's murder, but was acquitted. Chindamo was born in Italy to a father from Italy and a mother from the Philippines. He and his mother moved to the UK when he was six.

== Aftermath ==
The case increased the level of concern expressed about levels of violence involving school-age youths, and the safety of pupils and staff while in school, which were beginning to become public issues in the United Kingdom in the early 1990s. This followed the fatal stabbing of 12 year-old Nikki Conroy by a mentally ill intruder at her Middlesbrough school in March 1994. In March 1996, 16 young children and their teacher were shot dead by Thomas Hamilton, an intruder at their school in Dunblane, Scotland. In July 1996, nursery nurse Lisa Potts and several toddlers were wounded by machete-wielding Horrett Campbell, an intruder at their nursery school in Wolverhampton. These incidents all contributed to major strengthening of security measures at schools across Britain, particularly in areas with high crime rates.

Lawrence was posthumously awarded the Queen's Gallantry Medal (QGM) on 14 June 1997.

The Philip Lawrence Awards were instituted by the then Home Secretary Michael Howard in Lawrence's honour, and were first presented on 15 March 1997. They honour outstanding achievement by young people aged 11–20. Lawrence's widow Frances was appointed a Member of the Order of the British Empire (MBE) in the 2009 Birthday Honours for services to charity, for her role in setting up the award.

== Chindamo deportation controversy ==
In August 2007, an Asylum and Immigration Tribunal ruled that Chindamo could not be deported to his home country of Italy on completion of his prison sentence. He had resided in the UK for 19 years, long enough to make him a permanent resident under EU law after discounting 10 years spent in jail. As such, only 'serious grounds of...public security' could justify his expulsion. The tribunal disagreed with the Home Office's argument that this threshold was reached in Chindamo's case. The tribunal found that even if the EU law argument had failed, he would have a right to stay under human rights law. In the exceptional circumstances of his having lived in England since age 6, an Article 8 right to "family life" was found in relation to his mother and siblings.

The decision was severely criticised by Lawrence's widow, Frances Lawrence. David Cameron, then leader of the opposition, argued that the case showed the Human Rights Act 1998 'has to go' and be replaced.

== Release ==
In July 2010, after a parole board recommended his release, Chindamo made a statement saying "I did a terrible thing when I killed Mr. Lawrence... I have been rightly punished and I have always understood that I should not be released until I had changed and was no longer dangerous... I know that some people will not be able to accept that I have changed or that I should be allowed my freedom. I also know that I will spend the rest of my life atoning for my crime, and mean to do so by living quietly and decently." He was freed shortly afterwards, after serving 14 years of his life sentence.

On 24 November 2010, four months after being paroled, Chindamo was arrested in Catford and detained by police for questioning in connection with a mugging. He is alleged to have threatened to kill a man before robbing him of a wallet and mobile phone in Camden. As a result of his arrest and remand in custody Chindamo was recalled to custody under the terms of the life licence which comes with his original life sentence. On 24 August 2011, Chindamo and his two co-defendants were acquitted of robbery. He remained in custody under the terms of his life licence as he was adjudged to present a risk. On 2 May 2014, the Parole Board announced its approval of Chindamo's re-release from custody after serving three-and-a-half years.

== See also ==
- Murder of Ann Maguire, in 2014, while teaching a class in Leeds
- Sharon Carr – British child murderer who repeatedly stabbed another pupil at her school in 1994
