= Julie Walters =

British actress (born 1950)

Dame Julie Walters DBE
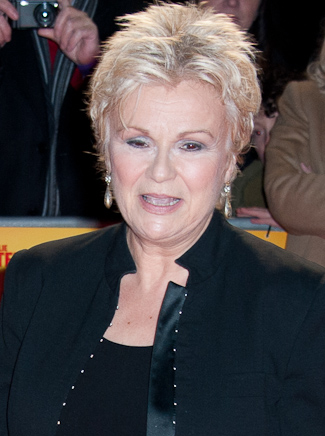
- Walters in 2014
- Born: Julia Mary Walters; 22 February 1950 (age 76); Edgbaston, Birmingham, England
- Education: Manchester School of Theatre
- Occupation: Actress
- Years active: 1972–present
- Spouse: Grant Roffey (m. 1997)
- Children: 1

Dame Julia Mary Walters (born 22 February 1950), known professionally as Julie Walters, is an English actress and comedian. She is the recipient of four British Academy Television Awards, two British Academy Film Awards, two International Emmy Awards, a Golden Globe Award, and an Olivier Award. Walters has been nominated for two Academy Awards across acting categories—once for Best Actress and once for Best Supporting Actress. She was honoured with the BAFTA Fellowship for lifetime achievement in 2014. She was made a Dame (DBE) by Queen Elizabeth II in 2017 for services to drama.

Walters rose to prominence playing the title role in Educating Rita (1983), a part she originated in the West End production of the stage play upon which the film was based. She has appeared in many other films, including Personal Services (1987); Prick Up Your Ears (1987); Buster (1988); Stepping Out (1991); Sister My Sister (1994); Girls' Night (1998); Titanic Town (1998); Billy Elliot (2000); seven out of eight Harry Potter films (2001–2011); Calendar Girls (2003); Becoming Jane (2007); Mamma Mia! (2008) and its 2018 sequel; Paddington (2014) and its sequels in 2017 and 2024; Brooklyn (2015); Film Stars Don't Die in Liverpool (2017); and Mary Poppins Returns (2018). On stage, she won an Olivier Award for Best Actress for the 2001 revival of All My Sons.

On television, Walters collaborated regularly with Victoria Wood; their projects included: Talent (1979), Nearly a Happy Ending (1980), Happy Since I Met You (1981), Wood and Walters (1981), Victoria Wood: As Seen on TV (1985–1987), Pat and Margaret (1994), and dinnerladies (1998–2000). She has won the British Academy Television Award for Best Actress four times, more than any other performer, for her roles in My Beautiful Son (2001), Murder (2002), The Canterbury Tales (2003), and Mo (2010). Walters and Helen Mirren are the only actresses to have won this award three consecutive times, and Walters is tied with Judi Dench for most nominations in the category with seven. She is the only actress to win the International Emmy Award for Best Actress twice, for her roles in A Short Stay in Switzerland (2009) and Mo (2010). In 2006, the British public voted Walters fourth in ITV's poll of TV's 50 Greatest Stars.

== Early life ==
Julia Mary Walters was born on 22 February 1950 at St Chad's Hospital in Edgbaston, Birmingham, England, the daughter of Mary Bridget (née O'Brien), an Irish Catholic postal clerk from County Mayo, and Thomas Walters, an English builder and decorator. According to the BBC genealogy series Who Do You Think You Are?, her maternal ancestors played an active part in the 19th-century Irish Land War. Her paternal grandfather Thomas Walters was a veteran of the Second Boer War, and was killed in action in World War I in June 1915 while serving with the 2nd Battalion of the Royal Warwickshire Regiment; he is commemorated at the Le Touret Memorial in France. Walters and her family lived at 69 Bishopton Road in the Bearwood area of Smethwick. The youngest of five children and the third to survive birth, Walters had an early education at St Paul's School for Girls in Edgbaston and later at Holly Lodge Grammar School for Girls in Smethwick. She said in 2014 that it was "heaven when [she] went to an ordinary grammar school", although she was asked to leave at the end of her lower sixth because of her "high jinks".

Walters later told interviewer Alison Oddey about her early schooling, "I was never going to be academic, so [my mother] suggested that I try teaching or nursing. [...] I'd been asked to leave school, so I thought I'd better do it." Her first job was in insurance at the age of 15. At the age of 18, she trained as a student nurse at the Queen Elizabeth Hospital in Birmingham; she worked on the ophthalmic, casualty, and coronary care wards during the 18 months she spent there. She decided to leave nursing and went on to study acting at the newly established Manchester Polytechnic School of Theatre (now Manchester School of Theatre). She worked for the Everyman Theatre Company in Liverpool in the mid-1970s, alongside several other notable performers and writers such as Bill Nighy, Pete Postlethwaite, Jonathan Pryce, Willy Russell, and Alan Bleasdale.

== Career ==
=== 1971–1979: Career beginnings ===
Walters first received notice as the occasional partner of comedian Victoria Wood, whom she had originally met in 1971 when Wood auditioned at the School of Theatre in Manchester. The two first worked together in the 1978 theatre revue In at the Death, followed by the television adaptation of Wood's play Talent.

They went on to appear in their own Granada Television series, Wood and Walters, in 1981. They continued to perform together frequently over the years. The BAFTA-winning BBC follow-up, Victoria Wood: As Seen on TV, featured one of Walters's best-known roles, Mrs Overall, in Wood's parodic soap opera, Acorn Antiques (she later appeared in the musical version, and received an Olivier Award nomination for her efforts).

=== 1980–1989: Educating Rita and Buster ===
"The basic premise – that education means choice – still matters today, the world over. And not just for women, but for all of us."

— Walters on Educating Rita.

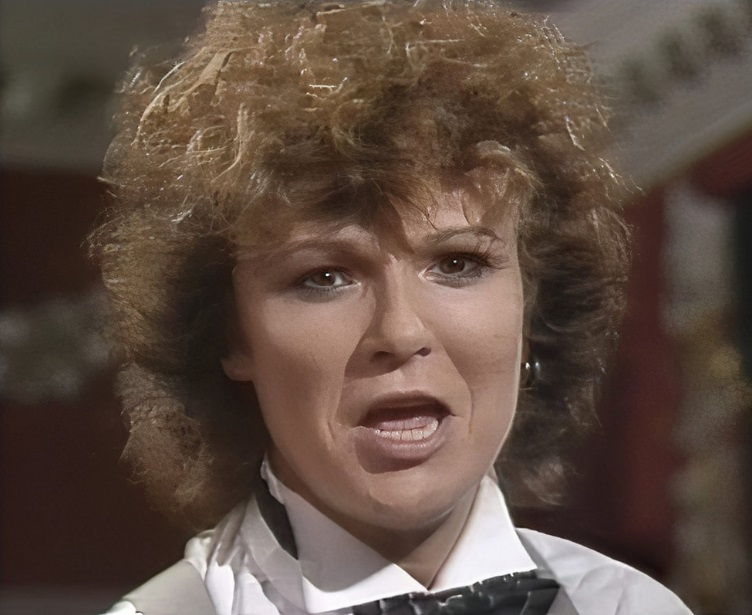
Performing in The Green Tie on the Little Yellow Dog

Walters' first serious acting role on television was in Alan Bleasdale's Boys from the Blackstuff in 1982. She came to national attention when she co-starred with Michael Caine in Educating Rita (1983), a role she had created on the West End stage in Willy Russell's 1980 play. Playing Susan "Rita" White, a Liverpudlian working-class hairdresser who seeks to better herself by signing up for and attending an Open University course in English literature, she would receive the BAFTA Award for Best Actress, the Golden Globe Award for Best Actress – Motion Picture Musical/Comedy, and a nomination for the Academy Award for Best Actress.

She performed various comic monologues in The Green Tie on the Little Yellow Dog, which was recorded 1982, and broadcast by Channel 4 in 1983. In 1985, she played Adrian Mole's mother, Pauline, in the television adaptation of The Secret Diary of Adrian Mole. Walters appeared in the lead role of Cynthia Payne in the 1987 film Personal Services – a dramatic comedy about a British brothel owner. Then she starred with Phil Collins, playing the lead character's wife, June, in the film Buster, released in 1988. She also appeared as Mrs. Peachum in the 1989 film version of The Threepenny Opera, which was renamed Mack the Knife for the screen.

=== 1991–1999: Solo TV show and dinnerladies ===
In 1991, Walters starred opposite Liza Minnelli in Stepping Out, and had a one-off television special, Julie Walters and Friends, which featured writing contributions from Victoria Wood, Alan Bennett, Willy Russell and Alan Bleasdale.

In 1993, Walters starred in the television film Wide-Eyed and Legless (known as The Wedding Gift outside the UK) alongside Jim Broadbent and Thora Hird. The film was based on the book by the author Deric Longden and tells the story of the final years of his marriage to his wife, Diana, who contracted a degenerative illness that medical officials were unable to understand at the time, though now believed to be a form of chronic fatigue syndrome or myalgic encephalomyelitis.

In 1998, she starred as the Fairy Godmother in the ITV pantomime Jack and the Beanstalk. From 1998 until 2000, she played Petula Gordeno in Victoria Wood's BBC sitcom dinnerladies. In the late 1990s, she featured in a series of adverts for Bisto gravy.

=== 2000–2009: Harry Potter, Mamma Mia and authorship ===
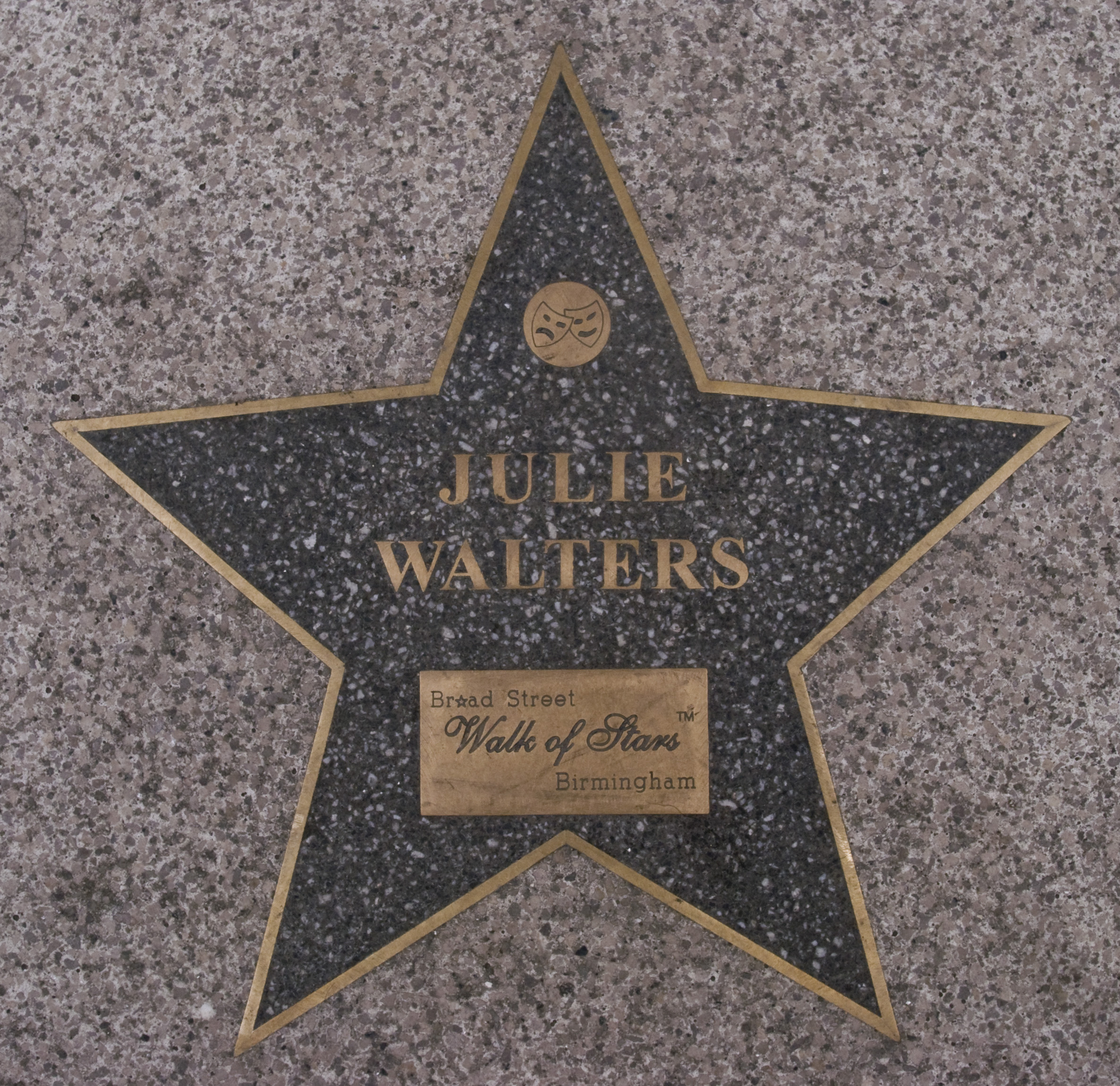
Walters' star on the Birmingham Walk of Stars

In 2001, Walters won a Laurence Olivier Award for her performance in Arthur Miller's All My Sons. She received her second Oscar nomination and won a BAFTA for her supporting role as the ballet teacher in Billy Elliot (2000). In 2002, she again won a BAFTA Television Award for Best Actress for her performance as Paul Reiser's mother in My Beautiful Son.

Walters played Molly Weasley, the matriarch of the Weasley family, in the Harry Potter film series (2001–2011). Harry Potter and the Goblet of Fire is the only film in the series not to have included Walters. In 2003, the BBC voted her portrayal of Molly as the "second-best screen mother."

In 2003, Walters starred as a widow (Annie Clark) determined to make some good come out of her husband's death from cancer in Calendar Girls, which starred Helen Mirren. In 2005, she again starred as an inspirational real-life figure, Marie Stubbs in the ITV1 drama Ahead of the Class. In 2006, she came fourth in ITV's poll of the public's 50 Greatest Stars, coming four places above frequent co-star Victoria Wood. In 2006, she starred in the film Driving Lessons alongside Rupert Grint (who played her son Ron in Harry Potter), and had a leading role in the BBC's adaptation of Philip Pullman's novel The Ruby in the Smoke.

In summer 2006, Walters published her first novel, Maggie's Tree. The novel, concerning a group of English actors in Manhattan and published by Weidenfeld & Nicolson, was described as "a disturbing and thought-provoking novel about mental torment and the often blackly comic, mixed-up ways we view ourselves and misread each other.". Another reviewer, Susan Jeffreys, in The Independent, described the novel as "the work of a writer who knows what she's doing. There's nothing tentative about the writing, and Walters brings her experiences as an actress to bear on the page. ... you do have the sensation of entering someone else's mind and of looking through someone else's eyes." Walters starred in Asda's Christmas 2007 television advertising campaign. She also appeared alongside Patrick Stewart in UK Nintendo DS Brain Training television advertisements, and in a series of public information films about smoke alarms. In June 2008, Walters appeared in the film version of Mamma Mia!, playing Rosie Mulligan, marking her second high-profile musical, after Acorn Antiques: The Musical!. The same year, she released her autobiography, titled That's Another Story.

In 2007, Walters starred as the mother of author Jane Austen (played by Anne Hathaway) in Becoming Jane. Walters played Mary Whitehouse in the BBC Drama Filth: The Mary Whitehouse Story (2008), an adaptation of the real-life story of Mrs. Whitehouse who campaigned for "taste and decency on television". Walters commented: "I am very excited to be playing Mary Whitehouse, and to be looking at the time when she attacked the BBC and started to make her name." Filth won Best Motion Picture Made for Television, and Walters was nominated for Best Actress in a Miniseries or a Motion Picture Made For Television, at the 2008 13th Annual Satellite Awards.

In 2009, she received a star in the Birmingham Walk of Stars on Birmingham's Golden Mile, Broad Street. She said: "I am very honoured and happy that the people of Birmingham and the West Midlands want to include me in their Walk of Stars and I look forward to receiving my star. Birmingham and the West Midlands is where I'm from; these are my roots and in essence it has played a big part in making me the person I am today". Her other awards include an International Emmy with for A Short Stay in Switzerland.

=== 2010–2019: Independent films and supporting roles ===
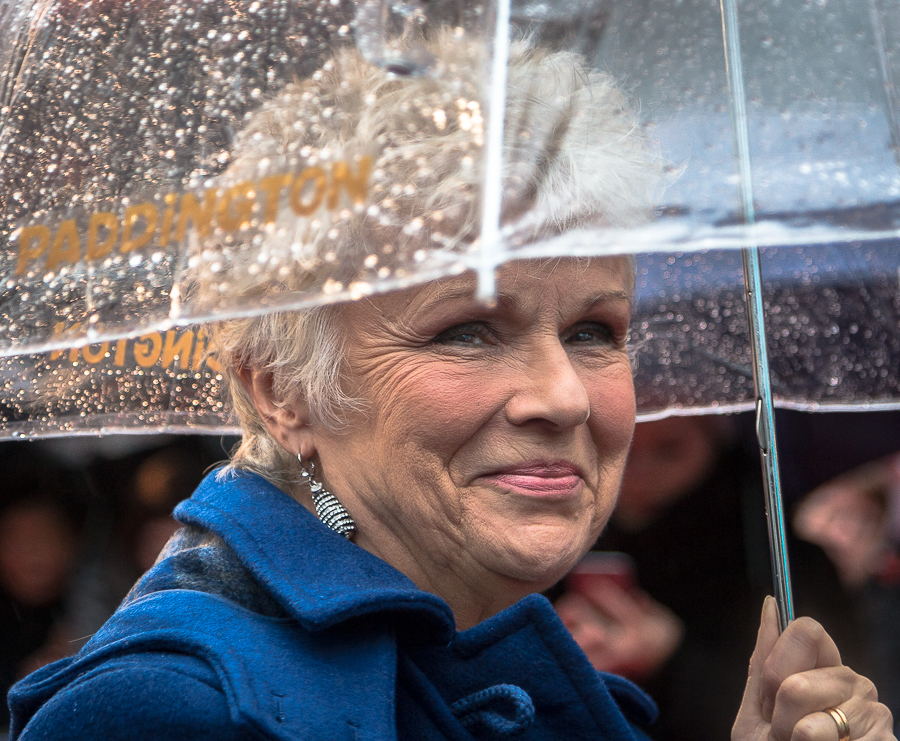
Walters at the premiere of Paddington in 2014

Walters played the late MP and Secretary of State for Northern Ireland Mo Mowlam in the drama Mo for Channel 4 broadcast in early 2010. She had misgivings about taking on the role because of the differences in their physical appearance, but the result was highly praised by critics.

In July 2012, Walters appeared in the BBC Two production The Hollow Crown as Mistress Quickly in Shakespeare's Henry IV, Parts I and II. In the summer of 2012, she voiced the Witch-turned-Woodcarver in Pixar's Brave (2012). In 2012, she worked with LV= to promote one of their life insurance products targeted at people over 50. Walters was seen in television advertisements, at the lv.com website and in other marketing material helping to raise awareness for life insurance.

Walters appeared in The Last of the Haussmans at the Royal National Theatre in June 2012. The production was broadcast to cinemas around the world through the National Theatre Live programme. On 18 November 2012, Walters appeared on stage at St Martin's Theatre in the West End for a 60th anniversary performance of Agatha Christie's The Mousetrap, the world's longest-running play.

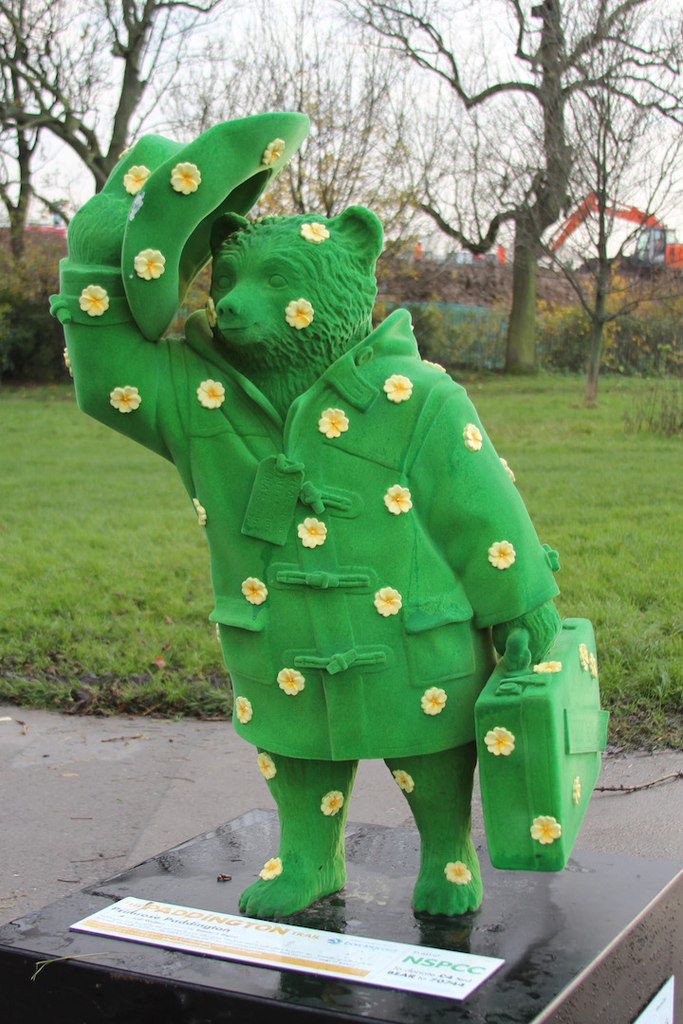
Walters' Paddington Bear designed "Primrose" themed statue in Primrose Hill, London, auctioned to raise funds for the NSPCC

In 2014, Walters portrayed Mrs. Bird, the Browns' housekeeper, in the critically acclaimed Paddington (2014). Walters reprised her role for the sequel, Paddington 2 (2017), which has also received universal acclaim. Upon the 2014 release of Paddington, Walters designed a "Primrose"-themed Paddington Bear statue, which was located in Primrose Hill (one of 50 placed around London), with the statues auctioned to raise funds for the National Society for the Prevention of Cruelty to Children (NSPCC).

Walters played the part of Cynthia Coffin in the ten-part British drama serial Indian Summers aired on Channel 4 in 2015. In 2015, she appeared in the romantic drama film Brooklyn, a film that was nominated for the Academy Award for Best Picture. Her performance in the film earned her a nomination for the BAFTA Award for Best Actress in a Supporting Role.

Walters voiced the Lexi Decoder (LEXI) for Channel 4 during the 2016 Paralympic Games. The graphical system aims to aid the viewing experience of the games by debunking the often confusing classifications that govern Paralympic sport. Set in London during the depression, Walters played Ellen, Michael's and Jane's long-time housekeeper, in Mary Poppins Returns (2018).

=== 2020–present: recent work ===
In 2020 Walters starred with Colin Firth in The Secret Garden (2020). Also in 2020, Walters featured as the narrator for ITV documentary For the Love of Britain.

On 25 December 2021 Channel 4 aired The Abominable Snow Baby, in which Walters appeared as Granny, providing her voice for the animated television short film.

In May 2022, Walters narrated the BBC One programme The Queen: 70 Glorious Years, a documentary about the Queen's life in her seventieth year on the British throne. In March 2023, Walters withdrew from filming Truelove due to "ill health", according to The Times, and her role was taken over by Lindsay Duncan.

== Personal life ==
Walters' relationship with Grant Roffey, a patrol man for the AA, began in 1985 after a chance meeting in a Fulham pub, where Roffey told her that he voted Labour. He was invited to repair Walters' washing machine, a whirlwind romance ensued and the couple became parents to their only child, a daughter, whom they named Maisie Mae Roffey (born 26 April 1988). The couple delayed marriage until they visited New York City in 1997. Since then, the family has lived on an organic farm operated by Roffey near Plaistow, West Sussex, as of 2012.

Walters is a patron of the domestic violence survivors' charity Women's Aid. She is a lifelong supporter of West Bromwich Albion Football Club, having been brought up in Smethwick.

Walters was diagnosed with stage III bowel cancer in 2018. Having had surgery and chemotherapy, she entered remission. This meant that she had to be cut from certain scenes in The Secret Garden and also had to miss the premiere of Mamma Mia! Here We Go Again. Walters did not announce her illness to the public until February 2020, when she said in an interview with Victoria Derbyshire that she would be taking a step back from acting, particularly from large and demanding film roles. Later that year, however, she stated that she would make an exception for roles that she was 'really engaged' with, including Mamma Mia 3!, which was in development as of 2021.

== Acting credits ==
=== Film ===
Year	Title	Role	Notes
1983	Educating Rita	Susan "Rita" White	Film debut
1985	She'll Be Wearing Pink Pyjamas	Fran	
1985	Dreamchild	Dormouse	Voice
1985	Car Trouble	Jacqueline Spong	
1987	Personal Services	Christina Painter	
1987	Prick Up Your Ears	Elsie Orton	
1988	Buster	June Edwards	
1988	Mack the Knife	Mrs. Peachum	
1989	Killing Dad or How to Love Your Mother	Judith	
1991	Stepping Out	Vera	
1992	Just like a Woman	Monica	
1994	Sister My Sister	Madame Danzard	
1996	Intimate Relations	Marjorie Beasley	
1997	Bathtime	Miss Gideon	
1998	Girls' Night	Jackie Simpson	
1998	Titanic Town	Bernie McPhelimy	
2000	Billy Elliot	Mrs Wilkinson	
2001	Lover's Prayer	Princess Zasyekin	
2001	Harry Potter and the Philosopher's Stone	Molly Weasley	Released as Harry Potter and the Sorcerer's Stone in the US
2002	Harry Potter and the Chamber of Secrets	Molly Weasley	
2002	Before You Go	Theresa	
2003	Calendar Girls	Annie	
2004	Harry Potter and the Prisoner of Azkaban	Molly Weasley	
2004	Mickybo and Me	Mickybo's Ma	
2005	Wah-Wah	Gwen Traherne	
2006	Driving Lessons	Evie Walton	
2007	Harry Potter and the Order of the Phoenix	Molly Weasley	
2007	Becoming Jane	Mrs Austen	
2008	Mamma Mia!	Rosie	
2009	Harry Potter and the Half-Blood Prince	Molly Weasley	
2010	Harry Potter and the Deathly Hallows – Part 1	Molly Weasley	
2011	Harry Potter and the Deathly Hallows – Part 2	Molly Weasley	
2011	Gnomeo and Juliet	Miss Montague	Voice
2012	Brave	The Crafty Carver (Witch)	Voice
2012	Thread of Evidence	Betty Beesom	
2012	The Legend of Mor'du	The Crafty Carver (Witch)	Voice; Short film
2013	Effie Gray	Margaret Cox Ruskin	
2013	Justin and the Knights of Valour	Gran	Voice
2013	One Chance	Yvonne Potts	
2013	The Harry Hill Movie	Harry's Nan	
2014	Paddington	Mrs Bird	
2015	Brooklyn	Mrs Kehoe	
2017	Film Stars Don't Die in Liverpool	Bella Turner	
2017	Paddington 2	Mrs Bird	
2018	Sherlock Gnomes	Miss Montague	Voice
2018	Mamma Mia! Here We Go Again	Rosie	
2018	Mary Poppins Returns	Ellen	
2019	The Queen's Corgi	The Queen	Voice
2019	Wild Rose	Marion	
2020	The Secret Garden	Mrs Medlock	
2021	The Abominable Snow Baby	Granny	Voice; Short film
2024	Paddington in Peru	Mrs Bird	

=== Television ===
Year	Title	Role	Notes
1975	Second City Firsts	Terry	Episode: "Club Havana"
1977	The Liver Birds	Girl in surgery	1 episode
1978	Me—I'm Afraid of Virginia Woolf	Woman in waiting room	Television film
1978, 82	Play for Today	Debbie/Valerie	2 episodes
1979	Empire Road	Jean Watson	2 episodes
1979	Talent	Julie Stephens	Television film
1979–81	Screenplay	Frances/Julie	3 episodes
1980	Nearly a Happy Ending	Julie Stephens	Television film
1981	Wood and Walters	various roles	Television film
1981	Happy Since I Met You	Frances	Television film
1981	BBC2 Playhouse	Mrs Morgan	Episode: "Days at the Beach"
1982	Boys from the Blackstuff	Angie Todd	2 episodes
1982	Say Something Happened	June Potter	Television film
1984	Love and Marriage	Bonnie	Episode: "Family Man"
1985	The Secret Diary of Adrian Mole, Aged 13¾	Pauline Mole	5 episodes
1985–86	Victoria Wood: As Seen on TV	various characters	13 episodes
1985, 93	Screen Two	Mavis/Monica	2 episodes
1986–87	Acorn Antiques	Mrs. Overall	6 episodes
1987	Theatre Night	Lulu	Episode: "The Birthday Party"
1988	Talking Heads	Lesley	Episode: "Her Big Chance"
1989	Victoria Wood	Various roles	3 episodes
1991	Julie Walters and Friends	herself/various roles	Television series
1991	G.B.H.	Mrs Murray	7 episodes
1992	Victoria Wood's All Day Breakfast	various roles	Television Special
1993	Screen One: Wide-Eyed and Legless	Diana Longden	Episode: "The Clothes in the Wardrobe"
1994	Bambino Mio	Alice	Television film
1994	Pat and Margaret	Pat Bedford	Television film
1994	Requiem Apache	Mrs Capstan	Television film
1995	Jake's Progress	Julie Diadoni	6 episodes
1996	Roald Dahl Little Red Riding Hood	Little Red Riding Hood; Grandma	Television film, BBC
1996	Brazen Hussies	Maureen Hardcastle	Television film
1998	Jack and the Beanstalk	Fairy Godmother	Television film
1998	Talking Heads 2	Marjory	Episode: "The Outside Dog"
1997	Melissa	Paula Hepburn	5 episodes
1998–2000	dinnerladies	Petula	9 episodes
1999	Oliver Twist	Mrs Mann	4 episodes
2001	Strange Relations: My Beautiful Son	Sheila Fitzpatrick	Television movie
2002	Murder	Angela Maurer	4 episodes
2003	The Return	Lizzie Hunt	Television movie
2003	The Canterbury Tales: The Wife of Bath	Beth	Episode: "The Wife of Bath"
2005	Ahead of the Class	Marie Stubbs	Television movie
2006	The Ruby in the Smoke	Mrs Holland	Television movie
2008	Filth: The Mary Whitehouse Story	Mary Whitehouse	Television movie
2009	A Short Stay in Switzerland	Dr Anne Turner	Television movie
2009	Victoria Wood's Mid Life Christmas	Bo Beaumont/Mrs. Overall	Television movie
2010	Mo	Mo Mowlam	Television movie
2011	The Jury	Emma Watts	Limited Series; 5 episodes
2012	The Hollow Crown	Mistress Quickly	Limited Series; 3 episodes
2015	Very British Problems	Herself/voiceover	2 seasons
2015	A Grand Night In: The Story of Aardman	Narrator	BBC, documentary
2015–16	Indian Summers	Cynthia Coffin	PBS Series; 20 episodes
2016	National Treasure	Marie Finchley	Limited Series; 4 episodes
2017	Our Friend Victoria	Herself / various characters	Documentary series
2017	Coastal Railways with Julie Walters	Herself / presenter	Documentary series
2019, 2021	Heathrow: Britain's Busiest Airport	Narrator	Documentary series
2020	For the Love of Britain	Narrator	Documentary series
2021	Terry Pratchett's The Abominable Snow Baby	Granny (voice role)	Short film
2022	The Queen: 70 Glorious Years	Narrator	BBC documentary

=== Theatre ===
Year	Title	Role	Venue
1976	The Taming of the Shrew	Performer	Royal Exchange
1976	Funny Peculiar	Irene Tinsley	Mermaid Theatre; Garrick Theatre, London
1977	Breezeblock Park	Vera	Mermaid Theatre; Whitehall Theatre, London
1979	Flaming Bodies	Irene Goodnight	ICA Theatre, London
1980	Educating Rita	Rita	Royal Shakespeare Company, London
1981	Having a Ball	Performer	Lyric Hammersmith Theatre, London
1984	Jumpers	Dotty	Royal Exchange Manchester
1984–85	Fool for Love	May	Royal National Theatre; Lyric Theatre, London
1985	Macbeth	Lady Macbeth	Leicester Haymarket Theatre
1986	When I Was a Girl I Used to Scream and Shout	Performer	Whitehall Theatre, London
1989	Frankie and Johnny in the Claire de Lune	Frankie	Comedy Theatre, London
1991	The Rose Tattoo	Serafina	Playhouse Theatre, London
2000	All My Sons	Katie Keller	Royal National Theatre, London
2005	Acorn Antiques: The Musical	Mrs. Overall	Theatre Royal Haymarket, London
2012	The Last of the Haussmans	Judy Haussman	Royal National Theatre, London

=== Bibliography ===
- Baby Talk: The Secret Diary of a Pregnant Woman (Ebury Press, 1990)
- Maggie's Tree (Weidenfeld & Nicolson, 2007)
- That's Another Story: The Autobiography (Orion Books, 2009)

== Honours ==
Walters was appointed Officer of the Order of the British Empire (OBE) in the 1999 Birthday Honours, Commander of the Order of the British Empire (CBE) in the 2008 New Year Honours, and Dame Commander of the Order of the British Empire (DBE) in the 2017 Birthday Honours for services to drama.

== Awards and nominations ==
=== Academy Awards ===
Year	Category	Nominated work	Result	Ref.
Academy Awards
1984	Best Actress	Educating Rita	Nominated	
2001	Best Supporting Actress	Billy Elliot	Nominated	

=== Actor Awards ===
Year	Category	Nominated work	Result	Ref.
Actor Awards
2001	Outstanding Performance by a Female Actor in a Supporting Role	Billy Elliot	Nominated	
2001	Outstanding Performance by a Cast in a Motion Picture	Billy Elliot	Nominated	

=== BAFTA Awards ===
Year	Category	Nominated work	Result	Ref.
British Academy Film Awards
1984	Best Actress in a Leading Role	Educating Rita	Won	
1984	Most Outstanding Newcomer to Film	Educating Rita	Nominated	
1988	Best Actress in a Leading Role	Personal Services	Nominated	
1992	Best Actress in a Supporting Role	Stepping Out	Nominated	
2001	Best Actress in a Supporting Role	Billy Elliot	Won	
2016	Best Actress in a Supporting Role	Brooklyn	Nominated	
British Academy Television Awards
1983	Best Actress	Boys from the Blackstuff / Say Something Happened	Nominated	
1987	Best Light Entertainment Performance	Victoria Wood: As Seen on TV	Nominated	
1994	Best Actress	Wide-Eyed and Legless	Nominated	
1999	Best Comedy Performance	dinnerladies	Nominated	
2002	Best Actress	My Beautiful Son	Won	
2003	Best Actress	Murder	Won	
2003	Special Award	—N/a	Honoured	
2004	Best Actress	Canterbury Tales: The Wife of Bath	Won	
2010	Best Actress	Mo	Won	
2010	Best Actress	A Short Stay in Switzerland	Nominated	
2014	BAFTA Fellowship	—N/a	Honoured	
British Academy Children's Awards
2022	Best Performer	Terry Pratchett's Abominable Snow Baby	Nominated	

=== Emmy Awards ===
Year	Category	Nominated work	Result	Ref.
International Emmy Awards
2009	Best Actress	A Short Stay in Switzerland	Won	
2011	Best Actress	Mo	Won	

=== Golden Globe Awards ===
Year	Category	Nominated work	Result	Ref.
Golden Globe Awards
1984	Best Actress in a Motion Picture – Musical or Comedy	Educating Rita	Won	
2001	Best Supporting Actress – Motion Picture	Billy Elliot	Nominated	

=== Laurence Olivier Awards ===
Year	Category	Nominated work	Result	Ref.
Laurence Olivier Awards
1980	Best Comedy Performance	Educating Rita	Nominated	
1984	Actress of the Year in a New Play	Fool for Love	Nominated	
2001	Best Actress	All My Sons	Won	
2006	Best Actress in a Musical	Acorn Antiques: The Musical!	Nominated	

=== Other awards ===
Year	Work	Role	Awards
2001	Billy Elliot	Sandra Wilkinson	Won– London Film Critics' Circle Award for British Actress of the Year Nominated– BIFA for Best Actress; Nominated– European Film Award for Best Actress Nominated– MTV Movie Award for Best Dance Sequence (shared with Jamie Bell)
2006	Driving Lessons	Evie Walton	Won– Silver St. George for Best Actress (28th Moscow International Film Festival)
2015	Brooklyn	Mrs Kehoe	Nominated– BIFA for Best Supporting Actress
2017	Film Stars Don't Die in Liverpool	Bella Turner	Nominated– BIFA for Best Supporting Actress
2019	Wild Rose	Marion	Nominated– BIFA for Best Supporting Actress

== See also ==
- List of Academy Award winners and nominees from Great Britain
- List of British actors
- List of Golden Globe winners
- List of International Emmy Award winners
