= The Douay Martyrs School =

The Douay Martyrs Catholic Secondary School

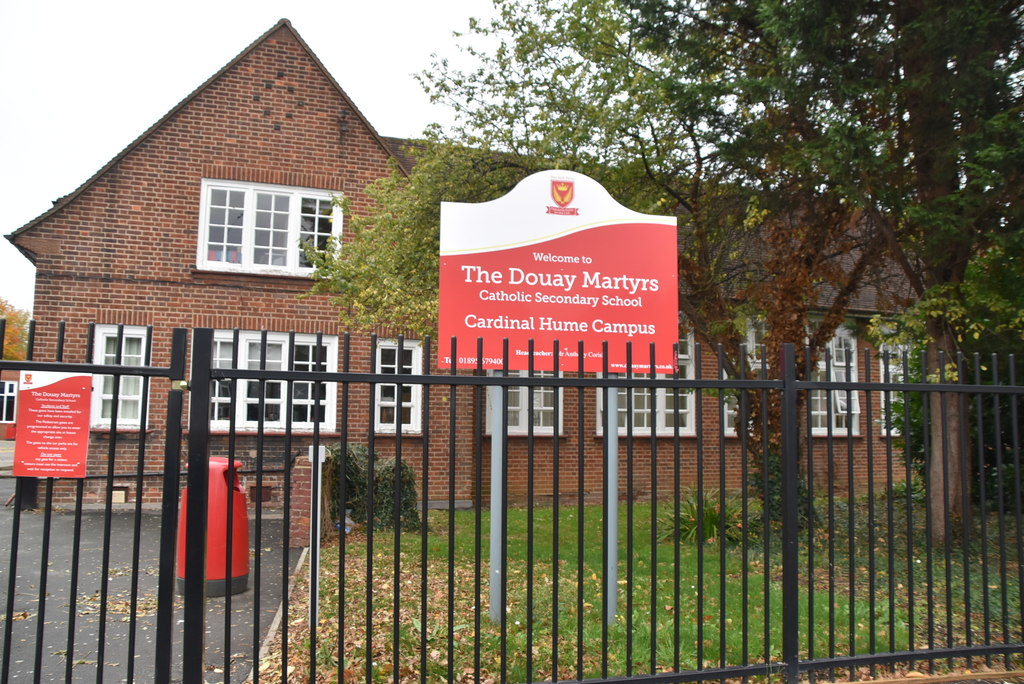

Location
- Edinburgh Drive; Ickenham, Greater London, UB10 8QY; England; 51.559°N 0.44452°W

Information
- Type: Academy
- Religious affiliation: Roman Catholic
- Established: 1962
- Department for Education URN: 137925 Tables
- Ofsted: Reports
- Head teacher: Fiona McCloskey
- Staff: 120 as of June 2019
- Gender: Coeducational
- Age: 11 to 18
- Enrolment: 1338 as of June 2019
- Houses: St Matthew, St Mark, St Luke, St John
- Website: www.douaymartyrs.co.uk

The Douay Martyrs Catholic Secondary School is a Roman Catholic secondary school and sixth form with academy status, located in Ickenham within the London Borough of Hillingdon, England. It serves around 1,300 pupils from a range of social backgrounds.

== History ==
The school opened in 1962 with 450 pupils, eventually rising to 862 by 1982.

Douay Martyrs is split into two campuses separated by Long Lane. The Arrowsmith campus contains the original building, and is situated in Edinburgh Drive near Ickenham tube station. The Cardinal Hume campus, though older, did not become part of Douay until 1974, formerly being Swakeleys School for Girls, though this was not its first identity. This site is nearer to Hillingdon tube station on Long Lane.

In 2006 the school submitted a proposal to relocate from the current two sites, to one new building based on the closed RAF West Ruislip site. This bid was turned down by the Ministry of Defence (United Kingdom).

A notable former head teacher of the school was Marie Stubbs who held the headship at Douay Martyrs before reforming the, at the time, notorious St George's Catholic School in Westminster.

== Results ==
At the end of the 2019 academic year that school had a progress 8 score of 0.22, making it above average according to the Department for Education. The school has considerably more pupils entered for the English Baccalaureate subjects than the Hillingdon and National averages.

The school was judged 'Good' by Ofsted in its most recent (2024) inspection report.

== Alumni ==
- Anthony Bailey (b. 1970) - public relations consultant
- Michael Olise (b. 2001) - professional footballer

== See also ==
- Douai Martyrs
