= Tower Hamlets Summer University =

British charity in Tower Hamlets area of London

Coordinates: 51°31′09″N 0°04′19″W

- Founded: 1995
- Founder: Michael Young
- Type: Charitable organisation
- Purpose: Youth work
- Location: London, United Kingdom
- Region served: United Kingdom
- Key people: Executive Director: Sarah Davies; Chair: Susie Meggitt; Patron: A. Dee (Artful Dodger); Patron: Baroness Kennedy; Patron: Deian Hopkin; Patron: Benjamin Zephaniah; Patron: Dame Marlene Robottom; Patron: Gerard Lemos; Patron: Yasmin Alibhai-Brown; Patron: Dizzee Rascal
- Employees: Approx. 25
- Volunteers: Approx. 200
- Website: futureversity.org

Tower Hamlets Summer University (THSU) was a British charity in the Tower Hamlets area of London which offered independent learning programs for people from 11 to 25 years of age. It rebranded to the name Futureversity in 2010.

== Projects ==
=== Holiday courses for young people ===
THSU ran short courses, typically two to five days long on a non-residential basis, which were provided free of charge to young people aged 11 to 25 across the borough of Tower Hamlets during school holidays. Courses covered subjects at a higher level than young students would normally be able to access, such as Careers in the City, The Trading Floor, Photography, Driving Theory, First Aid, Maths without Calculators, Jewellery Design and Making, Bollywood Dance, Film Making, Kick & Thai Boxing, Cricket, Tourism and Psychology.

=== Summer University Millennium Award Scheme I & 2 ===
Tower Hamlets Summer University (THSU) made 114 awards to young people in seven London boroughs to attend summer universities to give them the skills they needed to become ambassadors for their peers and to design and implement their own community projects. Applicants, between 14 and 19 years of age, submitted an idea for a youth and community project. The Award was made on the basis of merit and individual potential. Each Award was made up of a £2,000 training bursary and a £1,000 project grant, released after a year of personal development training. These young people went on to do some amazing work: Tolerance in Diversity was set up by a group of 6 as a charity that worked locally and internationally to combat Racism. In 2000 they were awarded the International Stop Racism Award, addressed the world at the International Day for the Elimination of Racial Discrimination by satellite link from Toronto and were invited to Breakfast at the White House. Another set up Teen Spirit, the first organisation to help children of parents with aids. Others set up their own projects and charities, became politicians, authors, and chart-topping musicians (Dizzi Rascle).

Summer Education (UK) made 82 awards to students at summer universities in selected areas across England. The scheme was run regionally on a similar basis to the first scheme. Aweard winners acted as youth ambassadors and undertook projects based on Gaining and Sharing Skills, Exploration and Discovery or Creativity, Culture and Your Community. Awards of between £2,797 and £3,297 provided individuals between 14 and 25 years with training in practical skills and the opportunities to enable them to develop and pass on their understanding, attitudes and enthusiasm to other young people and their communities. Individuals also carried out a community project, such as a skills workshop for young people, setting up a peer education drugs awareness programme or creating a drama production about the lives of young Asian women.

=== Nang! Magazine ===
Through one of the courses offered by THSU a magazine called Nang! was produced which promoted the work of THSU as well as giving a voice for young people involved in the courses.

=== Summer Uni London ===
Summer Uni London was a project commissioned to THSU by the Department for Education and Skills to develop other Summer Unis across London through training, support and resources.

=== Job Ready ===
A successful employment programme for unemployed 16- to 25-year-olds.

== Youth Volunteering ==
THSU promoted youth volunteering, including (but not limited to) participating in the Nang! project, as a Summer Uni Peer, or by joining FAB.

=== Summer University Peer Motivators ===
The Peer Motivation Scheme recruited up to 40 volunteers (aged 16–25) annually. They volunteered to support the holiday programmes as Peer Motivators or, later, as Team Leaders. The Peer Motivators marketed Summer Uni, worked as front of house, where they registered students and advised them on courses and worked with tutors as assistants. They formed their own 'crew', running a lunchtime and Friday evening club for the students, featuring MC and rap music, asian fusion and reggae music.

=== THSU Youth Advisory Board and FAB (Futureversity Advisory Board) ===
The trustee board was informed by a Youth Advisory Group who represented the views of young people to the board. Two young people from this group also sat on the board of trustees.

== History ==
Tower Hamlets Summer University was piloted in 1995 to help reduce youth crime in the borough during the summer holiday period. Since then, the charity has grown and inspired many other boroughs to pilot Summer Unis in London and across the UK

=== 1993 ===
In 1993, Lord Young of Dartington commissioned a research project led by a young Rushnara Ali, now MP for Bethnal Green and Stepney, to find out why youth crime increased each summer. The research concluded with several recommendations regarding summer provision for young people in the borough.

=== 1995 ===
In 1995, the Education Business Partnership and the borough invested time and money in piloting a programme of activities for 14- to 21-year-olds. This blue-print for Summer Uni was thoroughly documented with all results published in the autumn.

=== 1996 ===
In 1996, two senior workers from the youth and youth arts sectors, David Holloway OBE and Elizabeth Lynch, were seconded from the London Borough of Tower Hamlets, becoming the Directors of TH Summer University, establishing the Tower Hamlets programme and national roll-out. It was registered as a charity and company limited by guarantee ("Tower Hamlets Summer Education Ltd") in February of that year.

Having obtained the second UK Lottery Award, Elizabeth and David piloted and grew a programme of courses using conceptual arts, participative education and innovation. For example, the maths and sports course enabled those challenged to realise they were using maths all the time. Having young people at front and centre of the organisation provided a strong youth voice, which was inspirational and "if your mate is talking about it, it must be good".

This pilot was additionally the blueprint for the University of the First Age in 1996.

=== Late 1990s ===
By 1997, Hackney, Brent, Newham, Islington and Southwark piloted their own programmes and in the next two years, other boroughs and other areas of the country followed suit. Funding from the Lottery and the New Opportunities Fund (NOF) helped this momentum. In 1998, the NOF set up the 'Extending Opportunity' programme, with Summer Uni as an exemplar project. The Directors and Trustees established a second charity, Summer Education UK, to support and roll out programmes across the UK. By Summer 2000, Summer University programmes were running in most London boroughs and many more across the country.

=== 2006 ===
In 2006, Lord Andrew Adonis and the London Challenge team (part of the Department for Education and Skills) commissioned Tower Hamlets Summer University to roll out the model to every London borough. The young participants of Tower Hamlets Summer University chose to call this project 'Summer Uni London'. Summer Uni London was launched in June 2006.

=== 2010 ===
In 2010, THSU and Summer Uni London rebranded as Futureversity to help represent the nationwide expansion goals of the charity.

=== 2019 ===
In 2019 the charity decided to close its operations after several years of less successful fundraising. The logo, brand and programmes of the organisation were passed to the Essex based charity "Open Door" which then continued to provide holiday courses under the Futureversity brand, within the London Borough of Greenwich.
