= Michael Olise =

Professional footballer (born 2001)

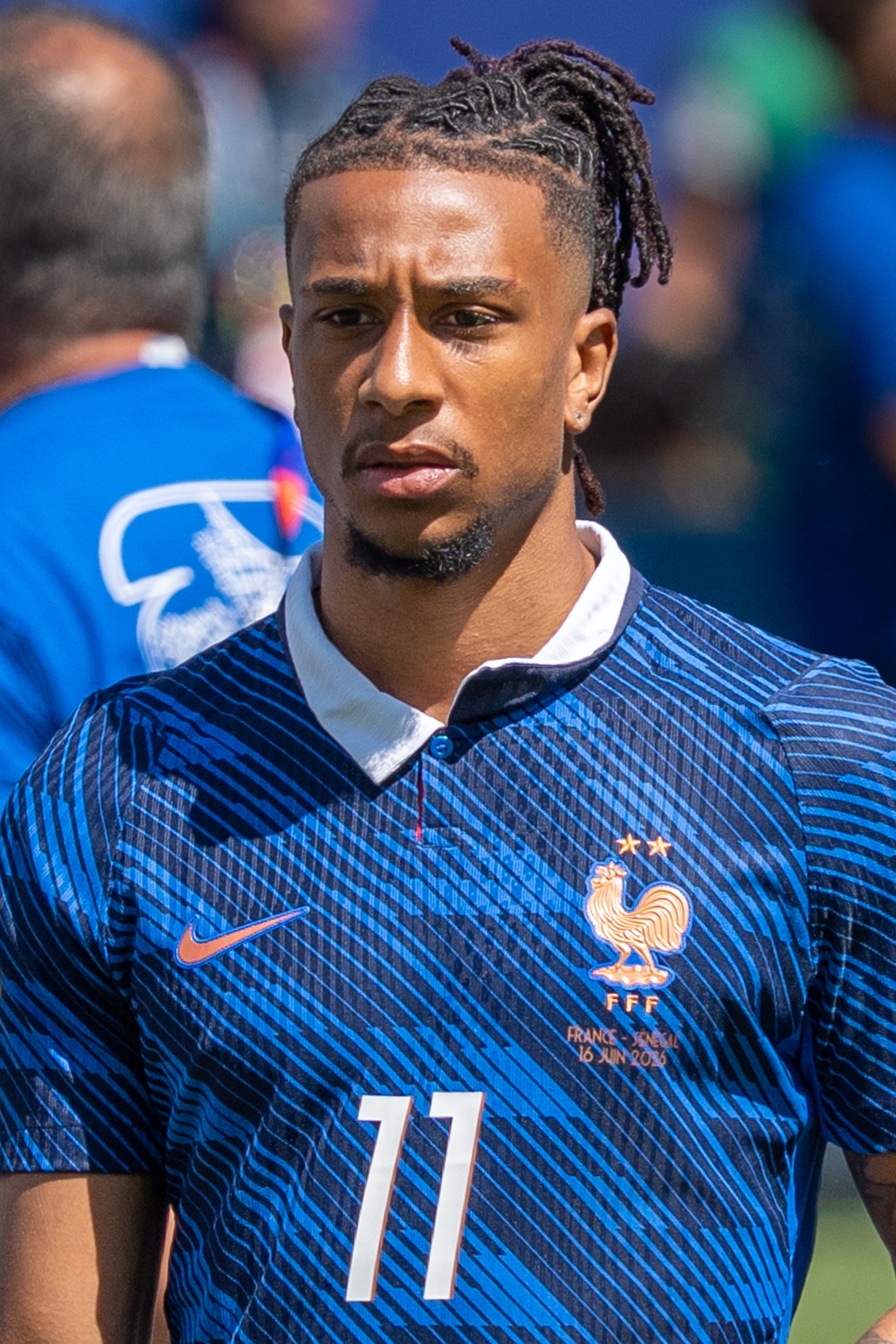
- Olise with France in 2026

Personal information
- Full name: Michael Akpovie Olise
- Date of birth: 12 December 2001 (age 24)
- Place of birth: White City, London, England
- Height: 1.80 m (5 ft 11 in)
- Positions: Winger; attacking midfielder

Team information
- Current team: Bayern Munich
- Number: 17

Youth career
- 2009: Arsenal
- 2009–2016: Chelsea
- 2016–2017: Manchester City
- 2017–2019: Reading

Senior career*
Years	Team	Apps	(Gls)
2019–2021	Reading	67	(7)
2021–2024	Crystal Palace	82	(14)
2024–	Bayern Munich	76	(33)

International career^{‡}
2019	France U18	2	(0)
2022–2023	France U21	7	(1)
2024	France Olympic	9	(5)
2024–	France	31	(12)
Medal record
Men's football
Representing France
UEFA Nations League
Third place	2025 Germany	Team
Olympic Games
Silver medal – second place	2024 Paris	Team
- * Club domestic league appearances and goals as of 21:24, 20 November 2026 (UTC) ‡ National team caps and goals as of 22:22, 15 November 2026 (UTC)

Michael Akpovie Olise (/ˈɒˈliseɪ/; o-LEE-say; Urhobo: [à.k͡pɔ̀.vjɛ̀ ɔ̀.lí.sɛ̀]; French: [maikəl olisɛ]; born 12 December 2001) is a professional footballer who plays as a winger or attacking midfielder for Bundesliga club Bayern Munich and the France national team. Widely regarded as one of the best players in the world, (Note: Attributed to multiple sources:) he is known for his creative playmaking, game intelligence, elegance, and flair.

Born in London, Olise is a product of various English academies. He made his professional debut for Championship club Reading at 17 years old in 2019 and won EFL Young Player of the Season in 2021. He was then signed by Premier League club Crystal Palace, aged 19, where he spent three seasons and set various club and league records. He was nominated for PFA Young Player of the Year in 2024 before moving to Bayern Munich.

At Bayern Munich, Olise emerged as one of the most dominant wingers in the world. In his debut campaign, he was named as the league's Rookie of the Season and was nominated for the Ballon d'or. The following year, he became the league's back-to-back assist leader, received VDV's and Bundesliga's Player of the Season awards, and received a second Ballon d'Or nomination. He has helped the club win two league titles and a DFB-Pokal.

Olise represented France at youth level and was included in their squad for the 2024 Summer Olympics, where he was top assister and received a silver medal. He made his debut for the senior French team in September 2024 and played at the 2026 FIFA World Cup where he registered a tournament-high seven assists — the most for any player in a single World Cup edition.

== Early life and family ==
Michael Akpovie Olise was born on 12 December 2001 in White City, London, England, and raised in the suburb of Hayes. His father, Vincent Olise, is a British-Nigerian deacon who was an international cricket player for Nigeria. His mother, Mina, is Franco-Algerian and works in property management. Together with his younger brother Richard, Olise was raised in a tight-knit and multicultural family. He characterises himself as coming "from four countries: France, Algeria, Nigeria, and England" all of which he regularly spent time in during childhood. He spoke both English and French at home. On his upbringing, Olise has stated:

"I have many different connections with Nigeria, Algeria, France, and England. It's not something I think about every day; it's perfectly normal for me. I carry little things from each country within me. It has broadened my horizons because these cultures are quite different from one another. At home, I had three cultures thanks to my parents. And outside, it was England, where I grew up. I didn't have to force this mix; it was just there."

Olise attended Dr Triplett’s Primary School, Douay Martyrs Catholic Secondary School, and St Bede's College. Good at maths and sciences and shy and quiet, he excelled in various sports including basketball, cricket, and table tennis. He was a cross-country running champion for the London borough of Hillingdon for two consecutive years, a district sports gold medallist in the 400 metres, and participated in the London Youth Games. As a youth, Olise idolised Neymar, Lionel Messi, and Zinedine Zidane and dreamt of joining France’s national football team.

== Club career ==
=== Early career ===
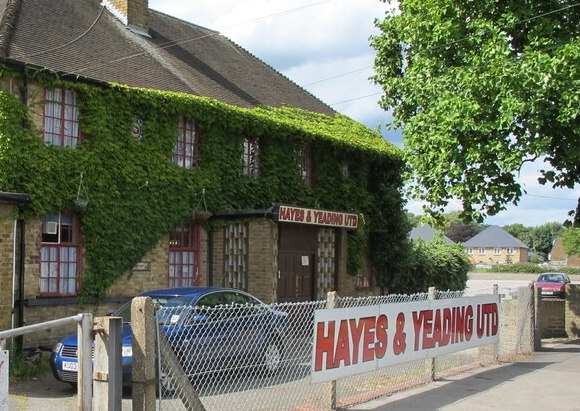
Olise started playing football at his local club, Hayes & Yeading United, when he was six years old

At age six, Olise joined his grassroots football club Hayes & Yeading United in west London after his mother responded to an advertisement for the club in the newspaper. Olise once arrived late with his parents after getting lost and the team was losing 2–0 at halftime. When Olise turned up during the break, he scored a hat-trick helping the team win. He also played against Bukayo Saka's local team. His under-7 coach described him as "an unselfish player" who "scored a lot of goals but probably set up even more". He was scouted by several academies and went on to have a brief spell at Arsenal but eventually opted for a team closer to home.

By the age of seven, Olise entered Chelsea Academy where he met Jamal Musiala. At Chelsea, he was described as talented but challenging; he had an obsession with wearing the No 10 shirt before the line-up is finalized and at times uncooperative and disruptive if the training sessions are differently set up. A former Chelsea youth coach characterised the young Olise as "complicated": "He has a very different way of thinking about life, about football. It’s what is his genius, it’s what makes him special." After a "mutual decision", he left Chelsea at 14 years old. He then joined Manchester City where he brought his chess strategy book during trials and was mocked for being weak by teammates. He had difficulty adjusting and left soon after. Olise went without a club for six months.

=== Reading ===
==== 2017–19: Rise to the first team ====
"He has magic. His shyness always disappeared when the ball appeared. That's when he transformed."

— Former Reading coach José Gomes about teenage Olise

After a scout recommended Olise to Reading, he began with the academy in a trial basis in August 2016. Reading's head of recruitment noted that he has a reserved personality but has total confidence in his footballing abilities, adding: "We just let Michael be Michael. Let him do what he does with a football. We never tried to take that creativity out of him." By July 2018, Olise was inducted into Reading Academy's scholarship program.

The club's first-team coach, José Gomes, discovered Olise during a youth team match and wanted to promote him in the first team immediately, stating: "Michael is really special. He can see, even before receiving the ball, more options than regular players. His technical ability and speed, decision capacity is really, really good." However, the youth academy directors initially dissuaded Gomes as Olise who "did not like to study" wasn't fulfilling his obligations as a student within the plan established for him. After some time, the academy drew up a programme to prepare him for his debut in the EFL Championship. Olise was "gangly" and "not very strong" to endure physical challenges so Gomes told his players to tackle him hard to toughen him up and teach him what professional football is like.

==== 2019–21: Professional debut and EFL Young Player of the Season ====
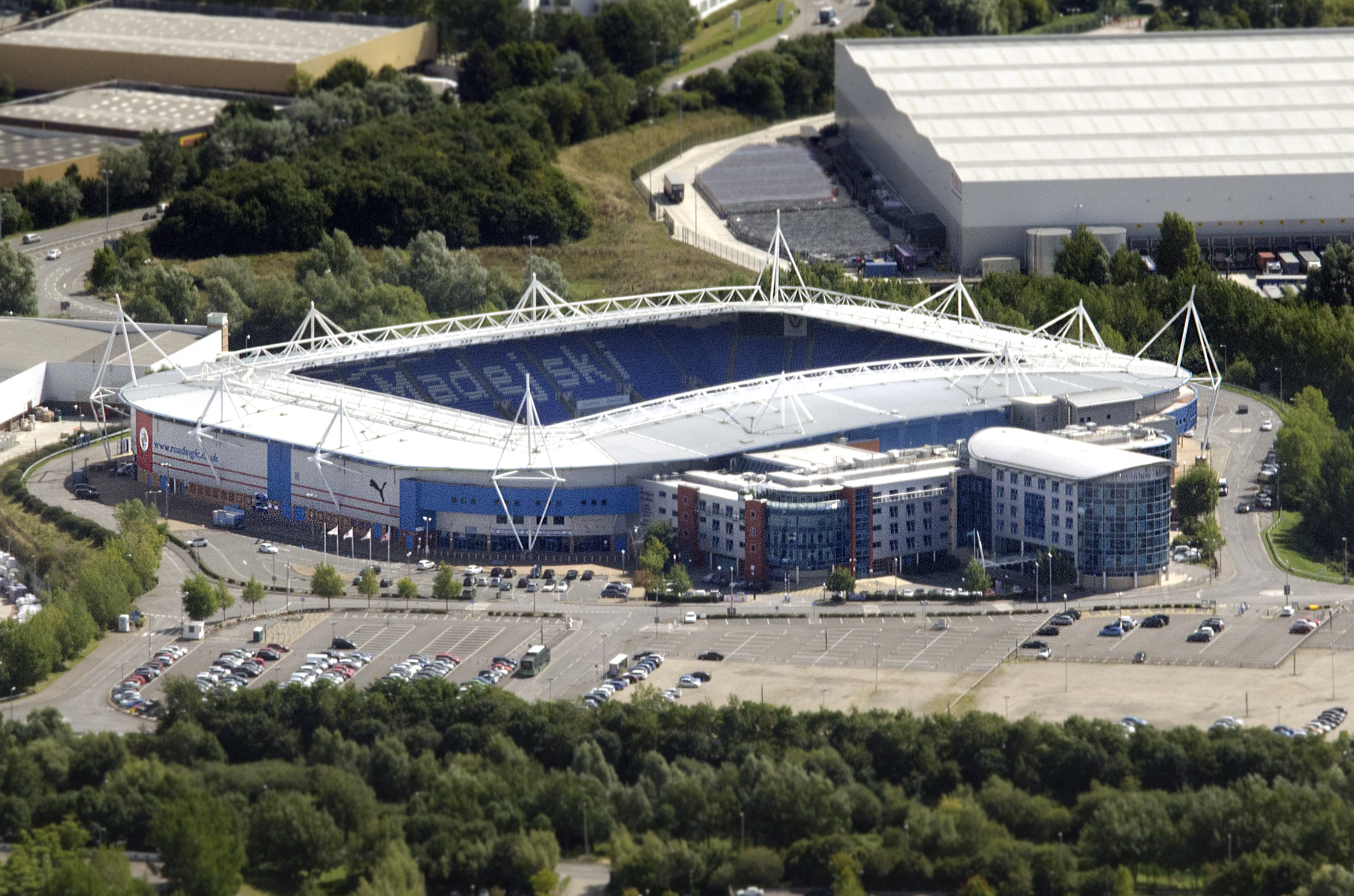
At 17 years old, Olise made his professional debut at Reading's Madejski Stadium

On 12 March 2019, 17-year-old Olise made his professional debut for EFL Championship club Reading coming in as a substitute for Modou Barrow in the 69th minute in a 3–0 home defeat to Leeds United. He was awarded Scholar of the Season in May and, after starting against Stoke City, became the youngest player in the whole of the Championship to play more than once in the season. On 15 July, he signed a three-year professional contract with the club. In his second season, Olise made 19 appearances – 13 of them starts.

In his third year, Olise started in 37 matches – seven more as substitute – contributed 12 assists, and scored seven goals. He scored his first league goal on 19 September 2020, volleying home in the 76th minute with the second goal in a 2–0 win over Barnsley at the Madejski Stadium. In December 2020, he scored twice in successive games, against Norwich City and an 89th-minute winner at Queens Park Rangers on his 19th birthday. Olise's winning goal was described by QPR manager Mark Warburton as a "world-class strike". He was named EFL Young Player of the Month for December. His performance as a midfielder placed him among the best players for creativity in the top two divisions of England, and along the top tiers of Spain, Germany, France and Italy. He won the EFL Young Player of the Season and was included in the EFL Championship Team of the Season and PFA Team of the Year – Championship. Olise was highly sought-after during the transfer window and attracted interest from European and Premiere League clubs including Borussia Dortmund, Liverpool, and Chelsea.

=== Crystal Palace ===
==== 2021–23: Club and Premier League records ====
On 8 July 2021, aged 19, Olise signed a five-year deal with Premier League club Crystal Palace after they had activated his £8 million release clause. He was coach Patrick Vieira's first signing in his tenure at the club. On 11 September, he made his Premier League debut in a 3–0 home win against Tottenham Hotspur after coming on as a substitute for Jordan Ayew in the 86th minute. Later that month, on 23 September, Olise made his full debut in a 1–1 home draw against Newcastle United. On 3 October 2021, Olise scored his first Premier League goal as a second-half substitute in a 2–2 home draw against Leicester City. In doing so, he became Palace's youngest Premier League scorer, at 19 years and 295 days, since Clinton Morrison in 1998. In January 2022, in an FA Cup third-round game against Millwall and his third start for the club, Olise provided a curling goal to tie the match minutes after half-time and set up the winning goal leading his team to a 1–2 victory. Olise took the knee in support of Black Lives Matter before kick off. In the same game, while taking a corner during the second half, he was hit on the head by a plastic bottle thrown from the Millwall stands which he brushed off outside the pitch. In his debut campaign, he had 12 starts from 26 total appearances in the competition. Across all competitions, he had an accumulated total of 1,503 minutes played, with eight assists (five in the league) and four goals (two in the league).

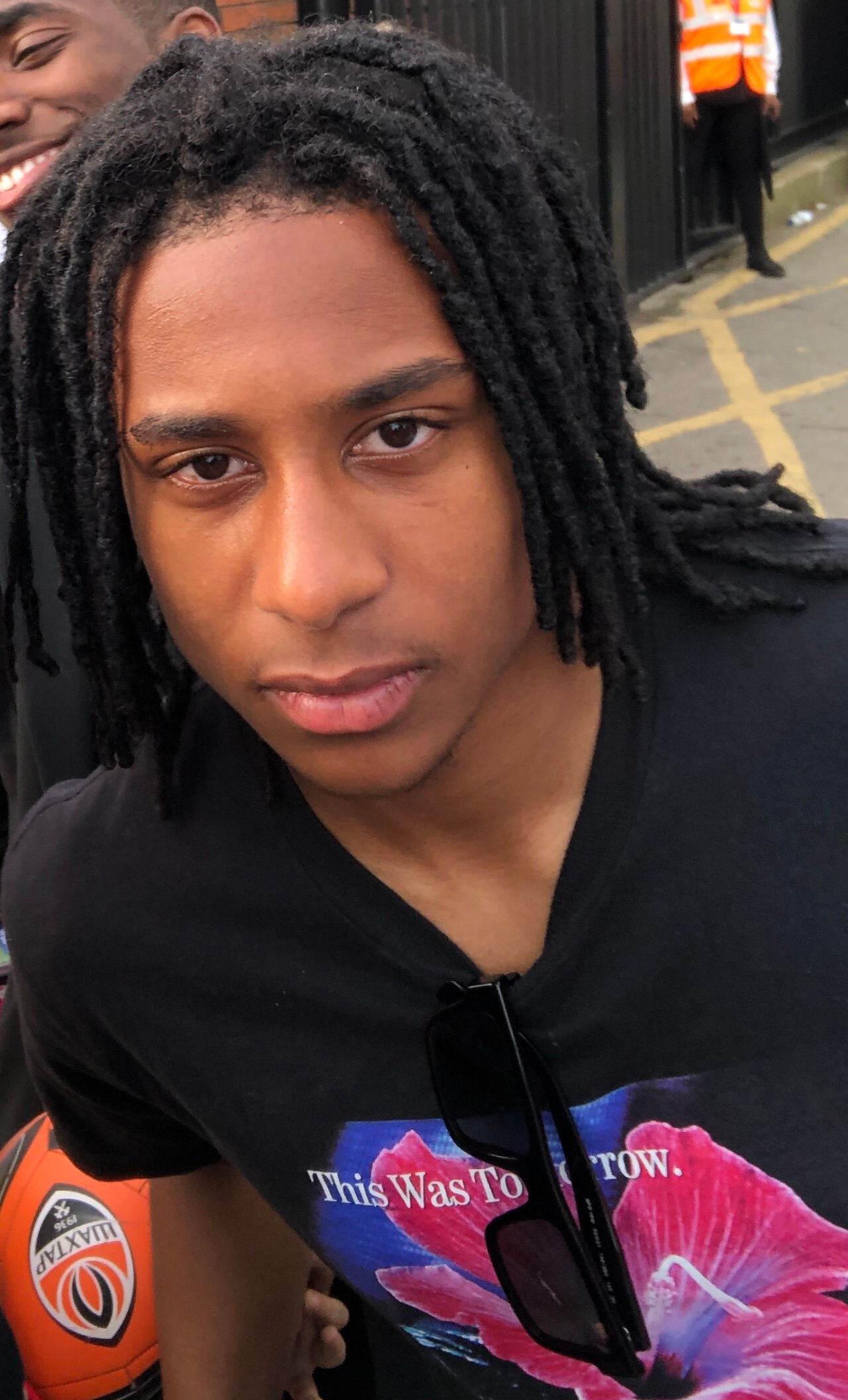
Olise in 2022

During his second season, Olise scored a late equalising free–kick in stoppage time against Manchester United in January 2023, denying Manchester a second place finish in the Premier League with the 1–1 draw. Olise's goal was awarded the Premier League Goal of the Month. Pundit Jamie Redknapp declared it "the best free-kick of the season" and a "stroke of genius" with Olise's non-celebration of the goal attracting fan and media attention. On 9 April 2023, Olise became the youngest player to assist three goals from open play in a single Premier League match in a 5–1 victory against Leeds United. On 13 May, he became the first Palace player to register ten assists in a single Premier League season, setting the second goal in a 2–0 win against Bournemouth. Olise had 40 appearances in all competitions with 11 assists and two goals, recording a joint-fourth highest total assists in the league and had more assists than any Under-21s player in Europe's top-five leagues. He was voted by teammates as the club's Player's Player of the Season.

==== 2023–24: Contract extension and PFA Young Player of the Year nomination ====
On 17 August 2023, Olise signed a new four-year deal with the club amidst reports that he was on the verge of joining Chelsea. Olise, who did not feature in Palace's preseason after tearing his hamstring during the Under-21 European Championship with France in June, had a rehabilitation setback post-surgery on the same hamstring in September. In February 2024, Olise was introduced at half-time against Brighton & Hove Albion but lasted less than 10 minutes before suffering a hamstring injury recurrence, with Palace eventually losing 4–1. Coach Roy Hodgson's decision to introduce the player to the match received criticisms from both fans and pundits citing injury mismanagement. Olise was eventually sidelined for two months. By April, he returned from injury and followed it with strong performances including scoring a two goals in a 4–0 victory over Manchester United on 6 May.

Olise concluded his third season with Palace with 10 goals and six assists in just 19 appearances, having been invigorated under new coach Oliver Glasner, and was later nominated for PFA Young Player of the Year. His form and output attracted interest from several clubs including Newcastle United, Arsenal, Chelsea, Manchester City, and Manchester United.

=== Bayern Munich ===
==== 2024–25: League title and rookie of the season ====
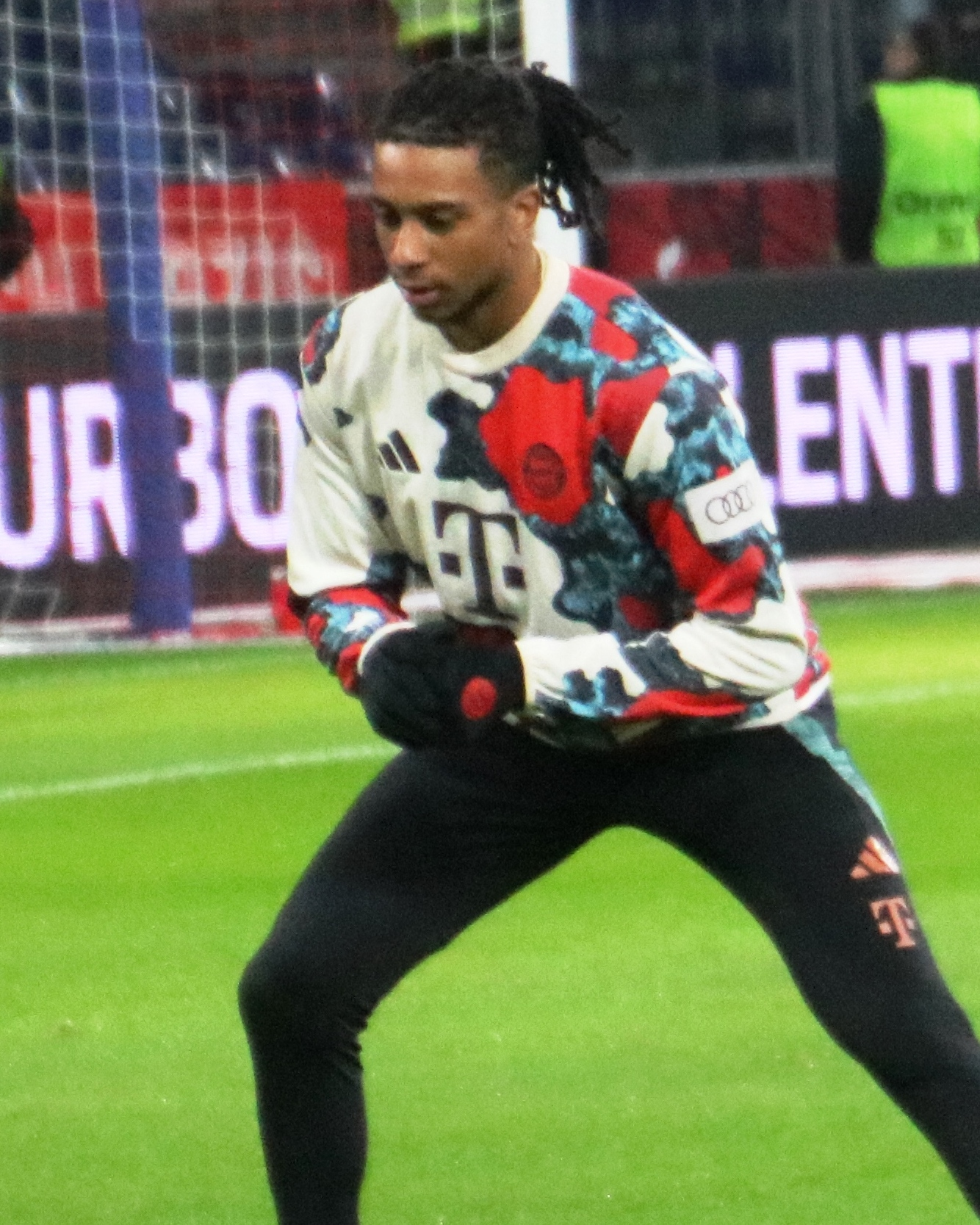
Olise with Bayern Munich in 2025

On 7 July 2024, Bundesliga club Bayern Munich announced the signing of Olise from Crystal Palace on a five-year contract valid through to 30 June 2029, for a reported transfer fee of €60 million (£50.8 million) including add-ons. At the time, it was the 4th most expensive signing in the club's history. Olise made his debut as a substitute for Serge Gnabry in the 77th minute in a 4–0 DFB-Pokal win against SSV Ulm on 16 August, registering an assist within two minutes of entering the pitch. On 14 September, he scored his first Bundesliga goal in a 6–1 victory over Holstein Kiel. Three days later, he netted two, his first goals at the Allianz Arena, on his UEFA Champions League debut, a 9–2 win over Dinamo Zagreb. Olise was Bundesliga Rookie of the Month in October 2024.

In the opening match of the 2025 FIFA Club World Cup, on 15 June 2025, Olise had a Man of the Match performance by netting two goals and provided two assists in a 10–0 win against Auckland City. He followed this with scoring the winner in a 2–1 victory against Boca Juniors, securing his club's qualification to the competition's knockout phase.

Olise's debut season in Munich was deemed triumphant by pundits with Olise ending the season as the league's top assist provider with 15 assists and 12 goals. He helped the team won the league title and the German Supercup; was voted as the club's Player of the Season, won the league’s Rookie of the Season award, and earned a spot in both VDV and Bundesliga's Team of the Season. Additionally, he was nominated for the 2025 Ballon d'Or.

==== 2025–26: Domestic treble and player of the season awards ====
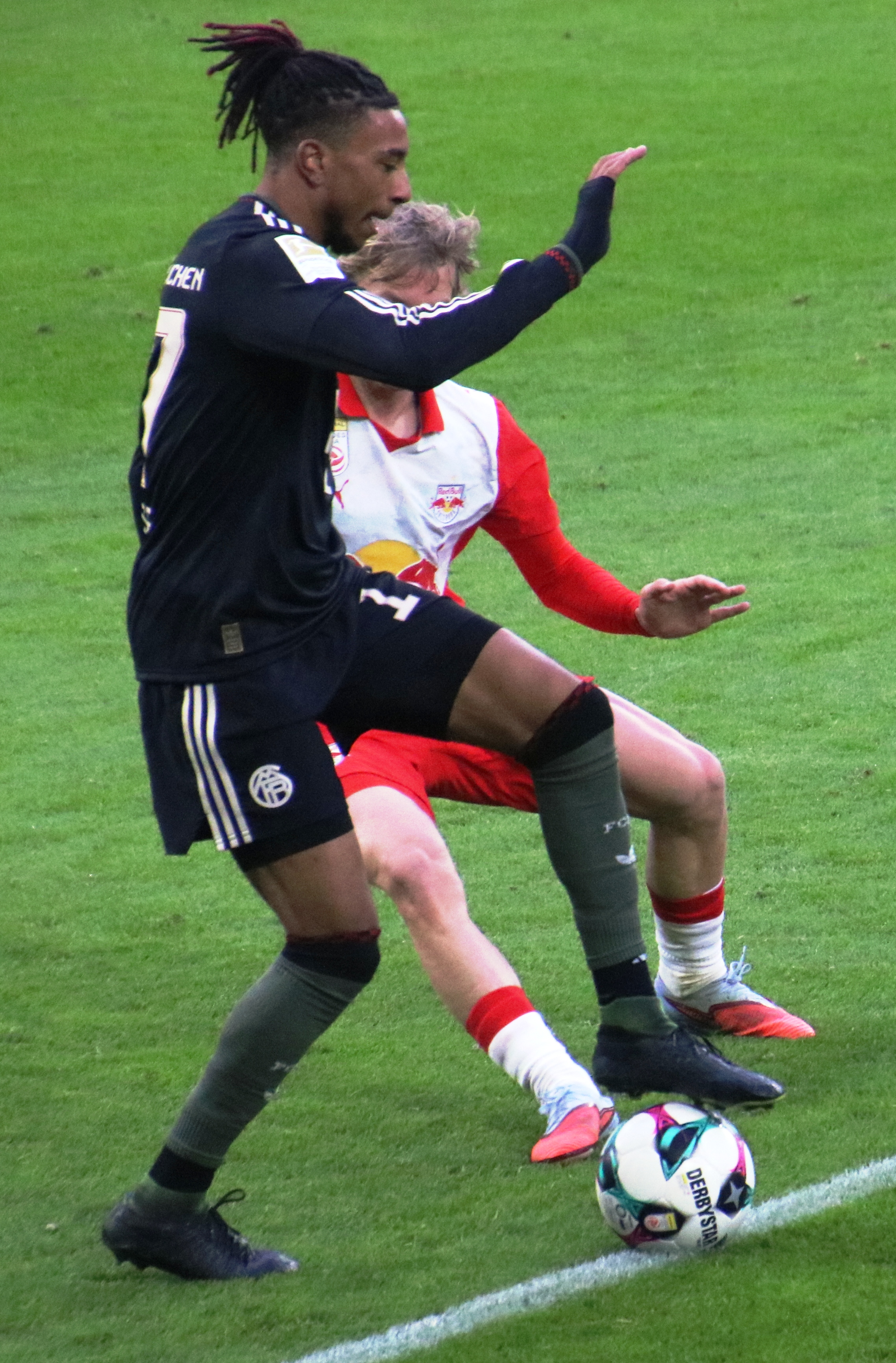
Olise playing for Bayern Munich in 2026

On 22 August 2025, Olise scored his first goals of the season by netting two in a 6–0 win over RB Leipzig. On 22 November 2025, Olise scored twice and set up three more goals in to maintain the club's unbeaten run and lead the title race with a 6–2 win against SC Freiburg. Olise came in as a 56th-minute substitute in an away game against RB Leipzig in 17 January 2026 and had a hat-trick of assist and a goal to turn the game around to a 1–5 triumph. He joined Franck Ribéry as the only player in the league to come in as a substitute and register three assists. On 7 April 2026, in the first-leg of the Champions League quarter-final against Real Madrid, Olise dominated defences and assisted the game-winning goal. Speaking on CBS, Jamie Carragher called it one of the best performances of the season. In the second leg, he netted a stoppage-time winner in a 4–3 triumph over Real Madrid and was named Man of the Match; sending his team through to the semi-finals. A month later, on 9 May, Olise scored in a 1–0 away win over Wolfsburg, becoming only the second player since detailed records began in 2004–05 to record at least 15 goals and 15 assists in a single Bundesliga season. He provided the breakthrough assist during the 2025–26 DFB-Pokal 3-0 final win against VfB Stuttgart to secure the team's domestic double. Olise was Bundesliga Player of the Month in April 2025, November 2025 and January 2026. In addition, he was awarded Bundesliga Goal of the Month in April 2026 and May 2026.

By the end of the season, Olise became the only player from Europe's top five leagues to score 20+ goals (22) and provide 20+ assists (26) in all competitions, with 15 goals and 19 assists in the Bundesliga. In the process, he has supplied goals for 12 of his club teammates, and scored or assisted against every team he has faced in the league two years since joining Bayern Munich. Olise was included in UEFA Champions League's Team of the Season and was joint top assister of the tournament with six. The club achieved the domestic treble by winning the league, the DFB-Pokal, and the German Supercup with Olise being voted as Bayern Munich's Player of the Season for the second year in a row. He was later named VDV Player of the Season (Silver Boot) by the professional footballer's union in Germany and was also included in VDV's Team of the Season. Additionally, he was awarded Bundesliga Player of the Season, and was also named Best Winger by the BBC as well as ESPN in its annual list of Best Male Footballers in the World. Furthermore, he received his second Ballon d'Or nomination.

==== 2026–27 season ====
On 22 August 2026, Olise provided an assist and a goal in Bayern Munich's 1–2 triumph over Borussia Dortmund to claim the Franz Beckenbauer Supercup and was named Man of the Match. He had his first two goals in the Champions League, in addition to an assist, during the team's 5–0 win against Bodø/Glimt in September 2026. Olise scored his first hat-trick at the club level on 18 September 2026 in a 7–0 win against Union Berlin, where he also provided an assist. He was named the league's Player of the Month for September.

== International career ==
Eligible to represent four countries internationally through parentage and birth, Olise was approached by the football federations of England, Algeria, and Nigeria but declined all to commit to France. On his decision to play for France, he has stated:

"My mother is from France. I used to come [to France] when I was young and always had the French jersey. I've always had a connection with France. It's been my dream since I was little."

Olise's mother sent highlight tapes of her son to the French Football Federation which was eventually discovered by Jean-Luc Vannuchi, the coach of the France national under-18 football team at the time.

=== Youth ===
On 27 May 2019, Olise was called up to the France national under-18 team for the 2019 Toulon Tournament. He made his debut on 2 June 2019, against Qatar U23. In March 2021, Olise was listed as a standby for the Nigeria squad taking part in their Africa Cup of Nations qualifiers against Benin and Lesotho. In March 2022, Olise was called up to the France under-21 team for the first time, and made his debut in the side's 2–0 win over the Faroe Islands on 24 March. On 28 June 2023, during the Under-21 European Championship, where Olise scored France's only goal in their group-stage victory over Norway, Olise suffered a grade three hamstring tear after colliding with the opponent's goalkeeper. This ruled him out from the rest of the tournament.

==== Olympics silver medal and top assister ====
On 8 July 2024, Olise was named by coach Thierry Henry in France's final squad for the 2024 Paris Olympics. Henry first knew of Olise after a recommendation from his former national teammate Patrick Vieira who coached Olise at Crystal Palace. Henry recalled that Olise could have gone on to represent England for Euro 2024 but was firm on joining the French team. At the time, Olise was in the middle of a transfer to Bayern Munich and requested to be allowed to participate in the Olympic games, which the club obliged to. Olise received his first cap with the French Olympic team on 4 July during a friendly game against Paraguay and scored his first two goals at a friendly match, a 7–0 win against the Dominican Republic.

On 24 July, during France's Olympic opener against the United States, he provided an assist and a goal described by the The Athletic as a "moment of magic to live long in the memory," contributing to the team's 3–0 victory. In the match versus Guinea, Olise "took over the final half an hour and his piercing cross set up the only goal of the night" helping his team reach the quarter finals. Against Argentina, he provided another assist in their 1–0 win. In the semi-final match versus Egypt, he registered an assist and a goal in stoppage time to help the team reach the gold medal match. In the team's 5–3 loss against Spain in the finals, Olise provided another assist. He ended the tournament as the best passer with five assists, in addition to two goals, winning a silver medal.

=== Senior ===
On 29 August 2024, Olise was called up to the senior France national team for the first time by manager Didier Deschamps, for their matches against Italy and Belgium in the UEFA Nations League. He made his debut on 6 September against Italy at the Parc des Princes, starting the game and playing 58 minutes in a 3–1 loss. On 23 March 2025, he scored his first senior goal for France in a 2–0 win over Croatia in the second leg of the Nations League quarter-finals, also recording an assist to help his side overturn a two-goal aggregate deficit and advance to the next stage of the competition. During the Nations League Finals on 8 June, he netted in a 2–0 victory against Germany in the third place play-off.

In September 2026, Olise was called up to Zinedine Zidane's first squad as new France national team manager. After playing as an attacking midfielder under Deschamps, he was deployed by Zidane as a right winger for the 2026–27 UEFA Nations League.

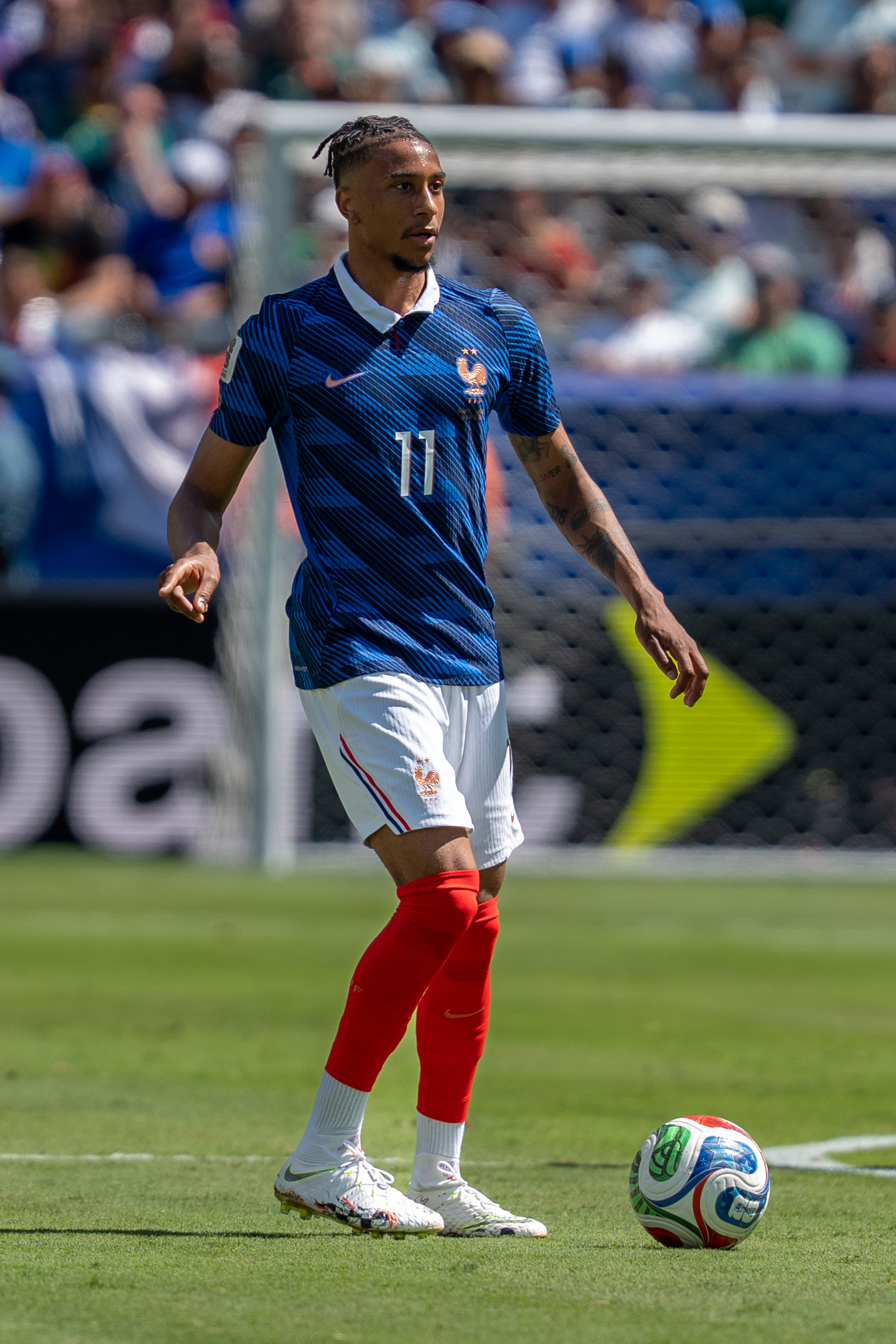
Olise at the 2026 FIFA World Cup

==== 2026 FIFA World Cup and assist record ====
On 11 May 2026, he was named in the France squad for the 2026 FIFA World Cup. A month later, on 8 June, he netted his first international hat-trick in a 3–1 friendly victory over Northern Ireland. He made his World Cup debut against Senegal, deployed as a winger in the first–half before moving centrally; he provided an assist and earned Superior Player of the Match honours in a 3–1 victory. He provided two assists in a 3–0 win over Sweden in the round of 32, bringing his total to five assists in the tournament, becoming the first player to reach that tally since Thomas Häßler in 1994. In the semi-final, he had limited influence against Spain's defensive structure in a match that ended in a 2–0 defeat. Olise provided two assists in the third-place match in which France suffered a 6–4 loss to England.

With a total of seven assists, Olise finished the tournament as the highest goal creator, and surpassed Pelé's record in 1970 for the most assists in a single World Cup since records began in 1966. He was named Best Playmaker of the World Cup by IFFHS and was also included in IFFHS's and FIFA's team of the tournament. Playing as an attacking midfielder, Olise's performance during the World Cup has been likened to Michel Platini's and Zinedine Zidane's. Platini himself has called Olise a classic No 10.

== Player profile ==
=== Style of play ===
Dubbed L'Artiste ("The Artist") by French media for the aesthetics of his play, (Note: Attributed to multiple sources:) Olise is known for combining technical precision and creative playmaking with unhurried poise and balletic elegance. His tactical intelligence and spatial awareness have been associated with his lifelong passion for chess; he produces plays no one anticipates and can create space and split defences through zugzwang.

"He is a dream come true. He doesn’t play the game, he thinks the game."

— Former France Olympic coach Thierry Henry on Olise

Though mainly left-footed, Olise is capable of passing and finishing with either of his feet. He plays with his head up and runs with a bolt-upright posture. Versatile with game-changing qualities, he can be deployed as an attacking midfielder or a winger on either side, but primarily plays on the right. Olise possesses a range of passing skills which he often use to play behind the opposition's defence or switch the angle of attack. A selfless player who assists as much as he scores, he likes to operate 50 to 30 yards out from goal in the right half-space, where he can use various options to continue the attack. On the ball, Olise is an agile and mobile player known for cutting inside from the right flank and using his left foot to curl the ball into the top left corner. A world-class dribbler, he is capable of turning quickly with good acceleration and change of pace, even when he is dribbling in very tight spaces or running with the ball. He employs body feints, shoulder drops, and reactionary touches to evade defenders. He has a sense of fun and trickery in his play and appears like he is constantly showing off for someone in the crowd.

Olise has stated that he is most comfortable operating in a more central role: "It's a freer role. I grew up playing as a number 10. So for me, it feels more natural." He credits the English academies he attended in his youth as well as street football for his style of play:

"I'd say it comes from street football. We'd play outside with my brother, kicking the ball against the wall, doing 1v1's, all that. It's a different kind of football, but it's definitely a way to learn. Football, in those conditions, is just freedom."

Olise's pre-game habits include a "blink and you’ll miss it" pitch inspection that consists of "a languid walk towards the fringe of the playing surface", a couple of scuffs of his trainers or slides on the grass and "a quick glance around the stadium" before going back to the dressing room. Another routine involves Olise – in the seconds before kick-off – running, leaping and performing a 360-degree spin in the air.

=== Personality ===
"He's not a very expressive character. He's rather introverted, but he’s very endearing."

— Former France national team coach Didier Deschamps on Olise

Olise's composure and effortless demeanour on and off the pitch led to him being affectionately called "Mr. Nonchalant" by fans and various media outlets. (Note: Attributed to multiple sources:) His muted, often emotionless, celebrations trace back to his boyhood; after a goal, "he would put his finger to his mouth and run back to his position, looking at the ground" and at medal ceremonies "he wanted to stay in the shadows... he stayed on the sidelines." Since becoming professional, his most used goal celebration involves "plugging an ear with one hand and making a 'shhh' gesture with the other." Rather than being a stunt or an expression of arrogance, Olise's former teammates and coaches explained that this subdued behaviour merely comes from Olise not wanting to draw attention to himself; he simply sees scoring goals as part of his job. Olise himself has stated:

"I am not a super emotional person. I don’t react the same way everyone else reacts."

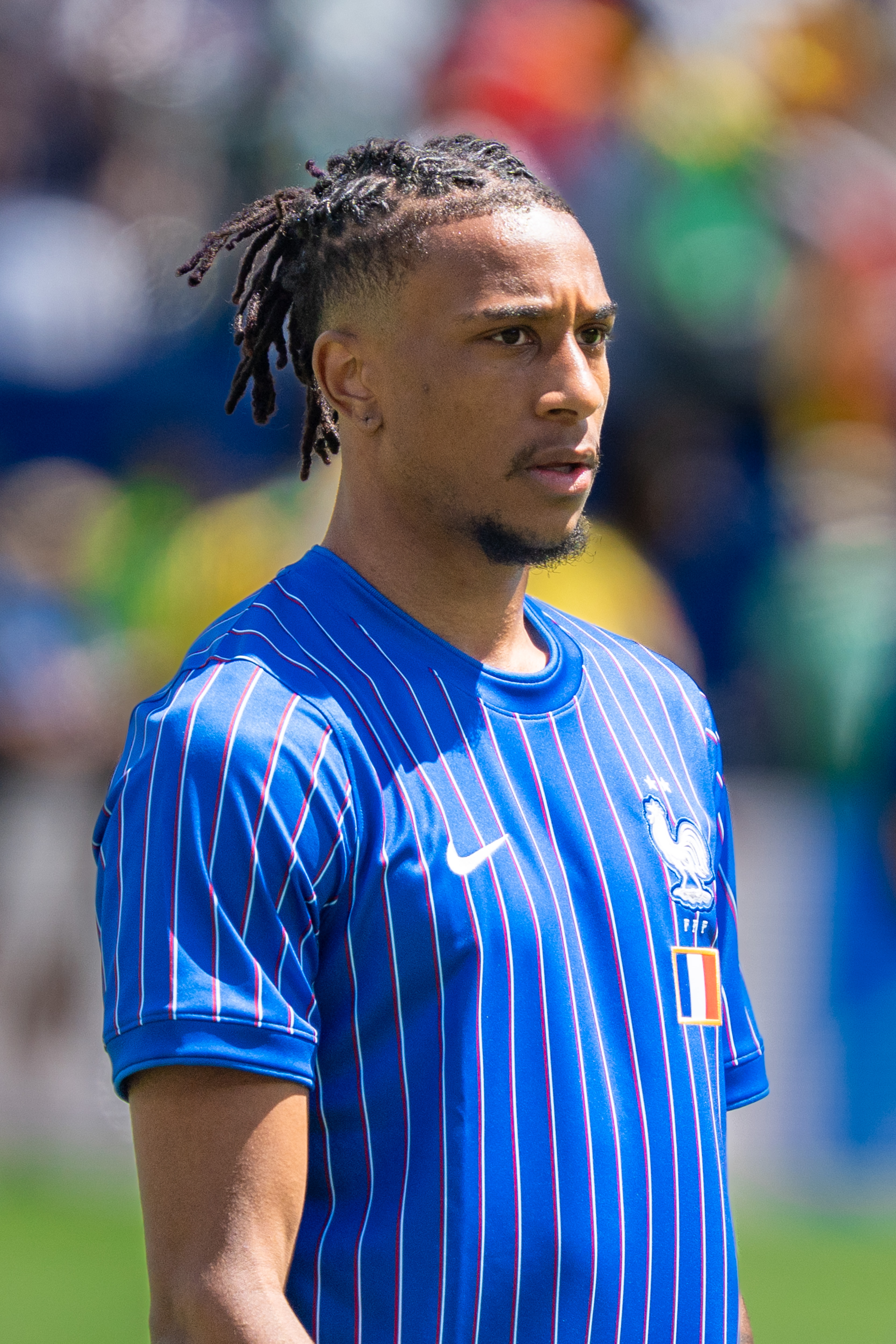
Olise in 2026

Quiet and reserved, Olise avoids the press. His rare on-camera interviews and media appearances – whether in English or French – are known to feature short and deadpan responses. Olise's former Crystal Palace coaches stated that it is not a gimmick; Patrick Vieira explained, "That's his personality. You ask him the question, he'll give you the answer. He's not playing a game. That's Michael." while Oliver Glasner articulated that "He is what he is: a soft-spoken man of few words. He does his talking on the pitch. He's a footballer, not an orator. Michael is a great person. I think it's important that people accept him for who he is." Amongst teammates and personnel, Olise is beloved and more forthcoming; often described as a humble and polite man who loves music and fashion, has a great sense of humour but does not like being the centre of attention. (Note: Attributed to multiple sources:)

For Bayern Munich coach Vincent Kompany, Olise is easy to work with for being "the whole package; not just how he plays football, but also who he is as a person." He has described Olise as "a thinker who is obsessed with work," someone who is "always thinking about the game in order to improve and perform well". The word kaizen, in kanji (改善), is tattooed on Olise's right leg, adopting it as his philosophy "of improving every day, little by little, until you reach a certain level." Although Olise appears to be coolly indifferent, he is ambitious and amongst the most obsessive and dedicated professionals in the game.

Since his professional debut, Olise has shunned official brand and boot sponsorships which, for the New York Times, is a personal decision that means forgoing "millions of pounds" annually. Adidas CEO Bjørn Gulden has publicly expressed his admiration for Olise and his intentions to sign him. Despite being coveted by brands, Olise wanted the creative freedom to coordinate his boots with the kit he wears. He is usually seen wearing the long-discontinued Nike Hypervenom Phantom III, scoured from resale sites, which he gets customised in a workshop in Edinburgh. Matt DiGiacomo, former creative director of Chrome Hearts, customised a pair of Hypervenoms for Olise during the 2026 FIFA World Cup.

=== Reception ===
"He’s an outstanding player. For football fans everywhere, he’s a pleasure to watch."

— Luís Figo on Olise

A wonderkid in his teens, Olise went under-the-radar before establishing himself as one of the best players in the world in his early 20s. A cerebral player, the BBC has labeled him a "rarity in modern football" for being "a true flair player with the end product to match. A player whose output matches their creativity."

Since committing to represent France internationally, the English press has been "torn between fascination and regret" regarding Olise. The Telegraph lamented that "It is a failure of English football that London-born Olise now stars for France". Olise first became known to the French public during the 2024 Paris Olympics. Since his call-up to the senior team, The Times and The Guardian have noted that Olise has captivated the French people with a string of impressive performances. Le Monde has described him as a "heaven-sent prodigy" for Les Bleus. For Le Figaro, Olise is an "artist who has captured hearts", while Le Parisien labelled him the "official distributor of happiness" for his national team contributions.

"Football is not dead. Michael Olise exists."

— Sports journalist Grégoire Margotton

Olise has been called an unconventional global superstar and an "anti-celebrity" for not cultivating his status for profit or publicity. (Note: Attributed to multiple sources:) For The New York Times this "looks a little like a rejection — of the game that surrounds the game, the whole circus... which is both vanishingly rare and incredibly cool." Often cited as one of the most stylish athletes internationally, (Note: Attributed to multiple sources:) GQ magazine writes that outside football, unlike his overly marketed contemporaries, Olise "has captivated the world with the quiet confidence of a discreet and restrained personality".

== Personal life ==
Olise scored 127 in an IQ test in 2024. He is a keen chess player having been taught by his mother in childhood. He regularly plays chess to shift the focus onto something else other than football. Olise is bilingual and speaks English and French.

== Career statistics ==
=== Club ===
As of match played 20 November 2026

Appearances and goals by club, season and competition
Club	Season	League			National cup (Note: Includes FA Cup, DFB-Pokal)		League cup (Note: Includes EFL Cup)		Europe		Other		Total	
Club	Season	Division	Apps	Goals	Apps	Goals	Apps	Goals	Apps	Goals	Apps	Goals	Apps	Goals
Reading	2018–19	Championship	4	0	0	0	0	0	—		—		4	0
Reading	2019–20	Championship	19	0	3	0	1	0	—		—		23	0
Reading	2020–21	Championship	44	7	1	0	1	0	—		—		46	7
Reading	Total		67	7	4	0	2	0	—		—		73	7
Crystal Palace	2021–22	Premier League	26	2	5	2	0	0	—		—		31	4
Crystal Palace	2022–23	Premier League	37	2	1	0	2	0	—		—		40	2
Crystal Palace	2023–24	Premier League	19	10	0	0	0	0	—		—		19	10
Crystal Palace	Total		82	14	6	2	2	0	—		—		90	16
Bayern Munich	2024–25	Bundesliga	34	12	2	0	—		14 (Note: Appearances in UEFA Champions League)	5	5 (Note: Appearances in FIFA Club World Cup)	3	55	20
Bayern Munich	2025–26	Bundesliga	32	15	6	2	—		13	5	1 (Note: Appearance in Franz Beckenbauer Supercup)	0	52	22
Bayern Munich	2026–27	Bundesliga	10	6	2	3	—		3	2	1	1	16	12
Bayern Munich	Total		76	33	10	5	—		30	12	7	4	123	54
Career total			225	53	20	7	4	0	30	12	7	4	286	76

=== International ===
As of match played 15 November 2026

Appearances and goals by national team and year
National team	Year	Apps	Goals
France	2024	4	0
France	2025	9	4
France	2026	18	8
Total		31	12

As of match played 12 November 2026
France score listed first, score column indicates score after each Olise goal

List of international goals scored by Michael Olise
No.	Date	Venue	Cap	Opponent	Score	Result	Competition	Ref.
1	23 March 2025	Stade de France, Saint-Denis, France	6	Croatia	1–0	2–0 (a.e.t.) (5–4 p)	2024–25 UEFA Nations League A	
2	8 June 2025	MHPArena, Stuttgart, Germany	8	Germany	2–0	2–0	2025 UEFA Nations League Finals	
3	5 September 2025	Wrocław Stadium, Wrocław, Poland	9	Ukraine	1–0	2–0	2026 FIFA World Cup qualification	
4	13 November 2025	Parc des Princes, Paris, France	13	Ukraine	2–0	4–0	2026 FIFA World Cup qualification	
5	8 June 2026	Stade Pierre-Mauroy, Lille, France	17	Northern Ireland	1–0	3–1	Friendly	
6	8 June 2026	Stade Pierre-Mauroy, Lille, France	17	Northern Ireland	2–0	3–1	Friendly	
7	8 June 2026	Stade Pierre-Mauroy, Lille, France	17	Northern Ireland	3–1	3–1	Friendly	
8	28 September 2026	King Baudouin Stadium, Brussels, Belgium	27	Belgium	1–0	1–0	2026–27 UEFA Nations League A	
9	2 October 2026	Stade de France, Saint-Denis, France	28	Italy	1–0	1–1	2026–27 UEFA Nations League A	
10	5 October 2026	Stade de France, Saint-Denis, France	29	Belgium	3–1	4–1	2026–27 UEFA Nations League A	
11	5 October 2026	Stade de France, Saint-Denis, France	29	Belgium	4–1	4–1	2026–27 UEFA Nations League A	
12	12 November 2026	San Siro, Milan, Italy	30	Italy	1–0	1–3	2026–27 UEFA Nations League A	

== Honours ==
Bayern Munich

- Bundesliga: 2024–25, 2025–26
- DFB-Pokal: 2025–26
- Franz Beckenbauer Supercup: 2025, 2026

France U23

- Summer Olympics silver medal: 2024

France

- UEFA Nations League third place: 2024–25

Individual

- Ballon d’Or nominee: 2025, 2026
- Bayern Munich Player of the Season: 2024–25, 2025–26
- Bundesliga Player of the Season: 2025–26
- Bundesliga Rookie of the Season: 2024–25
- Bundesliga Team of the Season: 2024–25, 2025–26
- Crystal Palace Goal of the Season: 2022–23
- Crystal Palace Players' Player of the Season: 2022–23
- EFL Championship Team of the Season: 2020–21
- EFL Championship Young Player of the Season: 2020–21
- FIFA World Cup Dream XI: 2026
- IFFHS Playmaker of the World Cup: 2026
- IFFHS Team of the World Cup: 2026
- London Football Awards Goal of the Season: Crystal Palace vs Luton Town
- PFA Team of the Year: 2020–21 Championship
- PFA Young Player of the Year nominee: 2023–24
- Reading Scholar of the Season: 2018−19
- VDV Player of the Season (Silver Boot): 2025–26
- VDV Team of the Season: 2024–25, 2025–26
- UEFA Champions League Team of the Season: 2025–26
- UNFP Best French Player Playing Abroad: 2025–26

Orders

- Knight of the National Order of Merit: 2024

Records

- Most assists in a single World Cup (7): 2026
- First player in history to be top assist provider in the World Cup (7), Champions League (6), and league (19) in the same season: 2025–26
- Youngest Premier League player to provide three assists from open play in a single match (21 years 118 days): 2022–23
