= Richard Olise =

English footballer (born 2004)

Personal information
- Full name: Richard Oghenekome Olise
- Date of birth: 9 September 2004 (age 22)
- Place of birth: London, England
- Height: 1.73 m (5 ft 8 in)
- Position: Defender

Youth career
- –2026: Chelsea

International career^{‡}
Years	Team	Apps	(Gls)
2021	England U18	1	(0)
- ‡ National team caps and goals as of 12 December 2024

Richard Oghenekome Olise (born 9 September 2004) is an English footballer who plays as a centre-back or right-back. He was trained at Chelsea's youth academy and is an English youth international.

== Early life ==
Richard Oghenekome Olise was born on 9 September 2004 in London, England. His father, Vincent Olise, is a British-Nigerian deacon who was an international cricket player for Nigeria. His mother, Mina, is Franco-Algerian and works in property management. Olise has named his older brother, Michael, as his football idol growing up.

== Club career ==
Olise started his career playing Sunday league football before being scouted at six years old. He was in the same football programme as Aaron Malouda in London. Olise then joined the youth academy of Premier League club Chelsea at the under-9 level.

Following his 17th birthday, Olise signed his first professional contract with Chelsea in September 2021 and was promoted to the club's under-18 team. A season prior, he made several appearances for the team including an appearance in the UEFA Youth League against Juventus. Three years later, Olise was promoted to Chelsea's reserve team. Sidelined for long periods of the 2021–22, 2022–23 and 2023–24 seasons, he returned to full fitness and had his first goal for the under-21 squad in the 6–0 victory over Fulham. In December 2024, he was included in the senior match squad, for the first time, in the UEFA Conference League match against Astana.

Coming back from an injury, Olise returned to the under-21 squad in October 2025 and scored a stoppage-time goal against Crystal Palace in a 4–2 victory, which secured the third place spot in the regular season Premier League 2 table. In the same month, he was registered by Chelsea for the Champions League home match against Ajax.

Olise departed Chelsea following the conclusion of 2025–26 season.

== International career ==
Olise was called up for the England national under-18 football team in September 2021. He traveled with the Young Lions for a week of training camp and a match against Wales at Newport County’s Spytty Park which resulted to a 1–1 draw.

== Style of play ==
Olise plays as a defender, specifically as a centre-back or as a right-back. He is a "very calm and composed right-sided defender who has the ability to both defend and attack" and "has all the attributes of a modern-day full-back."

== Personal life ==
Olise is a fan of basketball and American football.

== Career statistics ==
As of match played 23 September 2025

Appearances and goals by club, season and competition
Club	Season	League			FA Cup		EFL Cup		Europe		Other		Total	
Club	Season	Division	Apps	Goals	Apps	Goals	Apps	Goals	Apps	Goals	Apps	Goals	Apps	Goals
Chelsea U21	2024–25	—			—		—		—		3 (Note: Appearances in EFL Trophy)	0	3	0
Chelsea U21	2025–26	—			—		—		—		2	0	2	0
Career total			—		—		—		—		5	0	5	0
