= Bundesliga Awards =

Award given to the best footballers of Bundesliga

- Sport: Association football
- Competition: Bundesliga
- Awarded for: Best players of each Bundesliga season
- Country: Germany

History
- First award: 2017
- Editions: 10
- First winner: Robert Lewandowski (POL); (2020)
- Most wins: Robert Lewandowski (POL); Erling Haaland (NOR); Christopher Nkunku (FRA); Jude Bellingham (ENG); Florian Wirtz (GER); Harry Kane (ENG); Michael Olise (FRA); 1 time each
- Most recent: Michael Olise (FRA); (2026)

The Bundesliga Awards are awarded every year to the best footballers of Bundesliga.

== Criteria ==
Bundesliga Player of the Season, Rookie of the Season, Fair Play of the Season and Team of the Season awards are decided by fans (40%), clubs (30%) and experts (30%) votes.

== Winners ==
Season	Player of the Season	Rookie of the Season	Goal of the Season	Save of the Season	Ref.
2016–17	—N/a	(France) Ousmane Dembélé (Borussia Dortmund)	(Algeria) Nabil Bentaleb (Schalke 04)	—N/a	
2017–18	—N/a	(Morocco) Amine Harit (Schalke 04)	(Germany) Jonas Hector (1. FC Köln)	(Germany) Bernd Leno (Bayer Leverkusen)	
2018–19	—N/a	(Turkey) Ozan Kabak (VfB Stuttgart)	(France) Franck Ribéry (Bayern Munich)	(Switzerland) Roman Bürki (Borussia Dortmund)	
2019–20	(Poland) Robert Lewandowski (Bayern Munich)	(Canada) Alphonso Davies (Bayern Munich)	(Germany) Emre Can (Borussia Dortmund)	—N/a	
2020–21	(Norway) Erling Haaland (Borussia Dortmund)	(Democratic Republic of the Congo) Silas (VfB Stuttgart)	(Austria) Valentino Lazaro (Borussia Mönchengladbach)	—N/a	
2021–22	(France) Christopher Nkunku (RB Leipzig)	(Denmark) Jesper Lindstrøm (Eintracht Frankfurt)	(Philippines) Gerrit Holtmann (VfL Bochum)	—N/a	
2022–23	(England) Jude Bellingham (Borussia Dortmund)	(Germany) Karim Adeyemi (Borussia Dortmund)	(Netherlands) Matthijs de Ligt (Bayern Munich)	—N/a	
2023–24	(Germany) Florian Wirtz (Bayer Leverkusen)	(Nigeria) Victor Boniface (Bayer Leverkusen)	(England) Harry Kane (Bayern Munich)	—N/a	
2024–25	(England) Harry Kane (Bayern Munich)	(France) Michael Olise (Bayern Munich)	(Austria) Leopold Querfeld (Union Berlin)	—N/a	
2025–26	(France) Michael Olise (Bayern Munich)	(Ivory Coast) Yan Diomande (RB Leipzig)	(Germany) Ragnar Ache (1. FC Köln)	(Portugal) Daniel Heuer Fernandes (Hamburger SV)	

== Fair Play of the Season ==
Season	Winner	Reason	Ref.
2021–22	(Italy) Vincenzo Grifo (SC Freiburg)	Confessing that he wasn't fouled and asking the referee to cancel the decision to give his team a penalty.	
2022–23	Union Berlin	Stopping the goal celebration to ask for a medical help for a pitch-side photographer who injured himself while trying to take a photo of them and suddenly slipped.	
2023–24	(Germany) Timo Becker (Holstein Kiel)	Ensuring his rival that he wasn't fouled after he went to ground, following an aerial challenge in the penalty area.	
2024–25	SC Freiburg	Stopping their celebration after a win to applaud Holstein Kiel and their supporters, who were relegated with the result.	
2025–26	(Austria) Michael Gregoritsch (FC Augsburg)	Turning down a free kick in a dangerous position and telling the referee to overturn his foul decision in his side's match against Hamburger SV.	

== Team of the Season ==
=== Winners ===
Players marked bold won the Bundesliga Player of the Season Award in that respective season.

Season	Goalkeeper (club)	Defenders (clubs)	Midfielders (clubs)	Forwards (clubs)	Coach (club)
2012–13	(Germany) Manuel Neuer (Bayern Munich)	(Austria) David Alaba (Bayern Munich) (Brazil) Dante (Bayern Munich) (Germany) Mats Hummels (Borussia Dortmund) (Japan) Atsuto Uchida (Schalke 04)	(Germany) Bastian Schweinsteiger (Bayern Munich) (Germany) Mario Götze (Borussia Dortmund) (Germany) İlkay Gündoğan (Borussia Dortmund)	(Venezuela) Juan Arango (Borussia Mönchengladbach) (Poland) Robert Lewandowski (Borussia Dortmund) (Poland) Jakub Błaszczykowski (Borussia Dortmund)	—N/a
2013–14	(Germany) Manuel Neuer (Bayern Munich)	(Austria) David Alaba (Bayern Munich) (Greece) Sokratis Papastathopoulos (Borussia Dortmund) (Germany) Mats Hummels (Borussia Dortmund) (Japan) Atsuto Uchida (Schalke 04)	(Turkey) Nuri Şahin (Borussia Dortmund) (Netherlands) Arjen Robben (Bayern Munich) (Germany) Philipp Lahm (Bayern Munich)	(Germany) Marco Reus (Borussia Dortmund) (Poland) Robert Lewandowski (Borussia Dortmund) (France) Franck Ribéry (Bayern Munich)	—N/a
2014–15	(Germany) Manuel Neuer (Bayern Munich)	(Switzerland) Ricardo Rodriguez (VfL Wolfsburg) (Brazil) Naldo (VfL Wolfsburg) (Germany) Jérôme Boateng (Bayern Munich) (Portugal) Vieirinha (VfL Wolfsburg)	(Austria) David Alaba (Bayern Munich) (Belgium) Kevin De Bruyne (VfL Wolfsburg) (Spain) Xabi Alonso (Bayern Munich)	(Netherlands) Arjen Robben (Bayern Munich) (Poland) Robert Lewandowski (Bayern Munich) (Germany) Marco Reus (Borussia Dortmund)	—N/a
2015–16	(Germany) Manuel Neuer (Bayern Munich)	(Austria) David Alaba (Bayern Munich) (Germany) Mats Hummels (Borussia Dortmund) (Germany) Jérôme Boateng (Bayern Munich) (Poland) Łukasz Piszczek (Borussia Dortmund)	(Germany) Marco Reus (Borussia Dortmund) (Chile) Arturo Vidal (Bayern Munich) (Japan) Shinji Kagawa (Borussia Dortmund) (Armenia) Henrikh Mkhitaryan (Borussia Dortmund)	(Mexico) Javier Hernández (Bayer Leverkusen) (Poland) Robert Lewandowski (Bayern Munich)	(Germany) Thomas Tuchel (Borussia Dortmund)
2016–17	(Germany) Manuel Neuer (Bayern Munich)	(Bosnia and Herzegovina) Sead Kolašinac (Schalke 04) (Germany) Mats Hummels (Bayern Munich) (Germany) Niklas Süle (TSG Hoffenheim) (Poland) Łukasz Piszczek (Borussia Dortmund)	(Sweden) Emil Forsberg (RB Leipzig) (Spain) Thiago (Bayern Munich) (Guinea) Naby Keïta (RB Leipzig) (France) Ousmane Dembélé (Borussia Dortmund)	(Gabon) Pierre-Emerick Aubameyang (Borussia Dortmund) (Poland) Robert Lewandowski (Bayern Munich)	—N/a
2017–18	(Finland) Lukas Hradecky (Eintracht Frankfurt)	(Brazil) Wendell (Bayer Leverkusen) (Germany) Mats Hummels (Bayern Munich) (Brazil) Naldo (Schalke 04) (Germany) Joshua Kimmich (Bayern Munich)	(Jamaica) Leon Bailey (Bayer Leverkusen) (Germany) Leon Goretzka (Schalke 04) (Colombia) James Rodríguez (Bayern Munich) (Germany) Thomas Müller (Bayern Munich)	(Belgium) Michy Batshuayi (Borussia Dortmund) (Poland) Robert Lewandowski (Bayern Munich)	—N/a
2018–19	(Germany) Kevin Trapp (Eintracht Frankfurt)	(Germany) Danny da Costa (Eintracht Frankfurt) (Germany) Marcel Halstenberg (RB Leipzig) (Germany) Joshua Kimmich (Bayern Munich)	(Serbia) Filip Kostić (Eintracht Frankfurt) (Germany) Marco Reus (Borussia Dortmund) (Germany) Kai Havertz (Bayer Leverkusen) (England) Jadon Sancho (Borussia Dortmund)	(Serbia) Luka Jović (Eintracht Frankfurt) (Poland) Robert Lewandowski (Bayern Munich) (Germany) Julian Brandt (Bayer Leverkusen)	—N/a
2019–20	Not awarded				
2020–21	(Germany) Manuel Neuer (Bayern Munich)	(Canada) Alphonso Davies (Bayern Munich) (Spain) Angeliño (RB Leipzig) (Germany) Mats Hummels (Borussia Dortmund) (Germany) Ridle Baku (VfL Wolfsburg)	(Germany) Leon Goretzka (Bayern Munich) (Germany) Thomas Müller (Bayern Munich) (Germany) Joshua Kimmich (Bayern Munich)	(Portugal) André Silva (Eintracht Frankfurt) (Poland) Robert Lewandowski (Bayern Munich) (Norway) Erling Haaland (Borussia Dortmund)	—N/a
2021–22	(Germany) Manuel Neuer (Bayern Munich)	(Canada) Alphonso Davies (Bayern Munich) (Ivory Coast) Evan Ndicka (Eintracht Frankfurt) (Germany) Nico Schlotterbeck (SC Freiburg) (Germany) David Raum (TSG Hoffenheim)	(England) Jude Bellingham (Borussia Dortmund) (Germany) Florian Wirtz (Bayer Leverkusen) (Germany) Joshua Kimmich (Bayern Munich)	(Norway) Erling Haaland (Borussia Dortmund) (Poland) Robert Lewandowski (Bayern Munich) (France) Christopher Nkunku (RB Leipzig)	—N/a
2022–23	(Switzerland) Gregor Kobel (Borussia Dortmund)	(Canada) Alphonso Davies (Bayern Munich) (Netherlands) Matthijs de Ligt (Bayern Munich) (Germany) Nico Schlotterbeck (Borussia Dortmund) (Netherlands) Jeremie Frimpong (Bayer Leverkusen)	(England) Jude Bellingham (Borussia Dortmund) (Germany) Jamal Musiala (Bayern Munich) (Germany) Julian Brandt (Borussia Dortmund)	(France) Randal Kolo Muani (Eintracht Frankfurt) (Germany) Niclas Füllkrug (Werder Bremen) (France) Moussa Diaby (Bayer Leverkusen)	—N/a
2023–24	(Switzerland) Gregor Kobel (Borussia Dortmund)	(Spain) Álex Grimaldo (Bayer Leverkusen) (Germany) Waldemar Anton (VfB Stuttgart) (Germany) Jonathan Tah (Bayer Leverkusen) (Netherlands) Jeremie Frimpong (Bayer Leverkusen)	(Germany) Florian Wirtz (Bayer Leverkusen) (Switzerland) Granit Xhaka (Bayer Leverkusen) (Germany) Jamal Musiala (Bayern Munich)	(Nigeria) Victor Boniface (Bayer Leverkusen) (England) Harry Kane (Bayern Munich) (Guinea) Serhou Guirassy (VfB Stuttgart)	—N/a
2024–25	(Germany) Robin Zentner (Mainz 05)	(Germany) Jonathan Tah (Bayer Leverkusen) (France) Dayot Upamecano (Bayern Munich) (Germany) Nico Schlotterbeck (Borussia Dortmund) (Canada) Alphonso Davies (Bayern Munich)	(Germany) Florian Wirtz (Bayer Leverkusen) (Germany) Jamal Musiala (Bayern Munich) (France) Michael Olise (Bayern Munich)	(France) Hugo Ekitike (Eintracht Frankfurt) (England) Harry Kane (Bayern Munich) (Guinea) Serhou Guirassy (Borussia Dortmund)	—N/a
2025–26	(Switzerland) Gregor Kobel (Borussia Dortmund)	(Germany) Nico Schlotterbeck (Borussia Dortmund) (Germany) Jonathan Tah (Bayern Munich) (France) Dayot Upamecano (Bayern Munich) (Croatia) Luka Vušković (Hamburger SV)	(Germany) Joshua Kimmich (Bayern Munich) (Germany) Aleksandar Pavlović (Bayern Munich) (Germany) Angelo Stiller (VfB Stuttgart)	(Colombia) Luis Díaz (Bayern Munich) (England) Harry Kane (Bayern Munich) (France) Michael Olise (Bayern Munich)	—N/a

=== Multiple winners ===
Rank	Player	Apps	Club(s)
1	(Poland) Robert Lewandowski	9	Borussia Dortmund, Bayern Munich
2	(Germany) Manuel Neuer	7	Bayern Munich
3	(Germany) Mats Hummels	6	Borussia Dortmund, Bayern Munich
4	(Germany) Joshua Kimmich	5	Bayern Munich
5	(Austria) David Alaba	4	Bayern Munich
5	(Canada) Alphonso Davies	4	Bayern Munich
5	(Germany) Marco Reus	4	Borussia Dortmund
5	(Germany) Nico Schlotterbeck	4	SC Freiburg, Borussia Dortmund
9	(England) Harry Kane	3	Bayern Munich
9	(Switzerland) Gregor Kobel	3	Borussia Dortmund
9	(Germany) Jamal Musiala	3	Bayern Munich
9	(Germany) Jonathan Tah	3	Bayer Leverkusen, Bayern Munich
9	(Germany) Florian Wirtz	3	Bayer Leverkusen

== 2. Bundesliga Player of the Season ==
Season	Player of the Season	Club	Ref.
2024–25	(Germany) Davie Selke	Hamburger SV	
2025–26	(Turkey) Kenan Karaman	Schalke 04	

== See also ==
- VDV Awards
- Footballer of the Year
- Bundesliga records and statistics
