= St Thomas More Catholic School, Wood Green =

Coordinates: 51.6044°N 0.1083°W

St Thomas More Catholic School

Location
- Glendale Avenue; Wood Green, London, N22 5HN; England

Information
- Type: Academy
- Religious affiliation: Roman Catholic
- Established: 1952
- Department for Education URN: 139362 Tables
- Ofsted: Reports
- Chair: John Meadows
- Executive Headteacher: Martin Tissot
- Gender: Coeducational
- Age: 11 to 18
- Enrolment: c. 1200
- Website: http://www.stthomasmoreschool.org.uk/

St Thomas More Catholic School is a coeducational secondary school and sixth form with academy status, located in Wood Green, London N22. The school was founded in 1952 at Holcombe Road Tottenham, London N17, fourteen years after work had begun on the buildings. It is the only Roman Catholic secondary school in the London Borough of Haringey.

== The school today ==
The school has improved its standing in the examination result tables since the appointment in 2010 of executive headteacher, Martin Tissot, who is also headteacher of St George's Roman Catholic Secondary School in Maida Vale. In 2013, the pupils achieved 91% 5 A-Cs in GCSE, including English and Maths, putting them at the top of the table of Haringey secondary schools to become the "most improved school in the country". St Thomas More achieved academy status in March 2013 and Ofsted judged the school to be outstanding in June 2013.

New buildings include a Duke of Edinburgh Award training centre, a dance studio, music studios, drama studios, a multi gym and a floodlit astroturf pitch.

== Notable former pupils ==
- Tobi Adeyemo (b. 2005) - professional footballer, Watford F.C.
- Daniel Boateng (b. 1992) - professional footballer, Arsenal F.C.
- Samantha Fox (b. 1966) - singer and glamour model
- Tony Jarrett (b. 1968) - hurdler
- Shaun Leane (b. 1969) - jeweller
- Emma Ania (b. 1980) - athlete
- Pops Mensah-Bonsu (b. 1983) - NBA player
- Stefflon Don (b. 1991) - Rapper and singer
- Lawrence Vigouroux (b. 1993) - footballer
