= Lisa Potts =

British crime victim and writer

Lisa Webb GM
- Born: Lisa Potts; 1974 or 1975; Wolverhampton, England
- Occupation: Former nursery teacher
- Known for: Defending children in her care from a machete attack

Lisa Victoria Webb GM (née Potts, born 1974 or 1975) is an English public health nurse, who, when working as a nursery teacher, defended her class of 3–4-year-olds from attack. On 8 July 1996, her class at St Luke's Primary School in Blakenhall, Wolverhampton, England, was attacked by a man with severe paranoid schizophrenia wielding a machete.

Potts's arm was almost severed in the attack, in which four children were also injured. Potts, who was 21 years old at the time, also suffered severe cuts to her head, back, and to both arms. In 1997, Queen Elizabeth II presented Potts with the George Medal. Her attacker, Horrett Campbell, was sentenced to indefinite detention in a secure mental hospital.

Potts suffered severe scarring, depression and post-traumatic stress disorder. She was awarded £68,300 criminal injuries compensation (equivalent to £128,219 in 2025) more than four years after the attack. The compensation was widely criticised as inadequate, especially by comparison with contemporary high libel awards.

Potts subsequently worked as a counsellor and, in 2001, founded a charity, Believe to Achieve, based in schools in Wolverhampton. The charity aims to encourage independence and to increase self-esteem in children. Potts published an autobiography, Behind the Smile, in 1998. Cherie Blair wrote the foreword. Potts went on to study a degree in counselling in 2004. In 2010, she retrained as a nurse at the University of Wolverhampton and then went on to become a specialist public health nurse.

In 2022, Potts was made the first Freewoman of the City of Wolverhampton. On 24 July 2022, she participated in the Queen's Baton Relay marking the 2022 Commonwealth Games when it visited Wolverhampton.

== Books ==
- Thank You God: Book of Children's Prayers (editor) (1997) Hodder Children's Books, London ISBN 0-340-70981-2
- Behind the Smile: My story by Lisa Potts (1998) Hodder & Stoughton, London ISBN 0-340-72148-0
- Heroes for a Day (2000) Hodder & Stoughton, London ISBN 0-340-74586-X
