= Hannah Yelland =

British actress

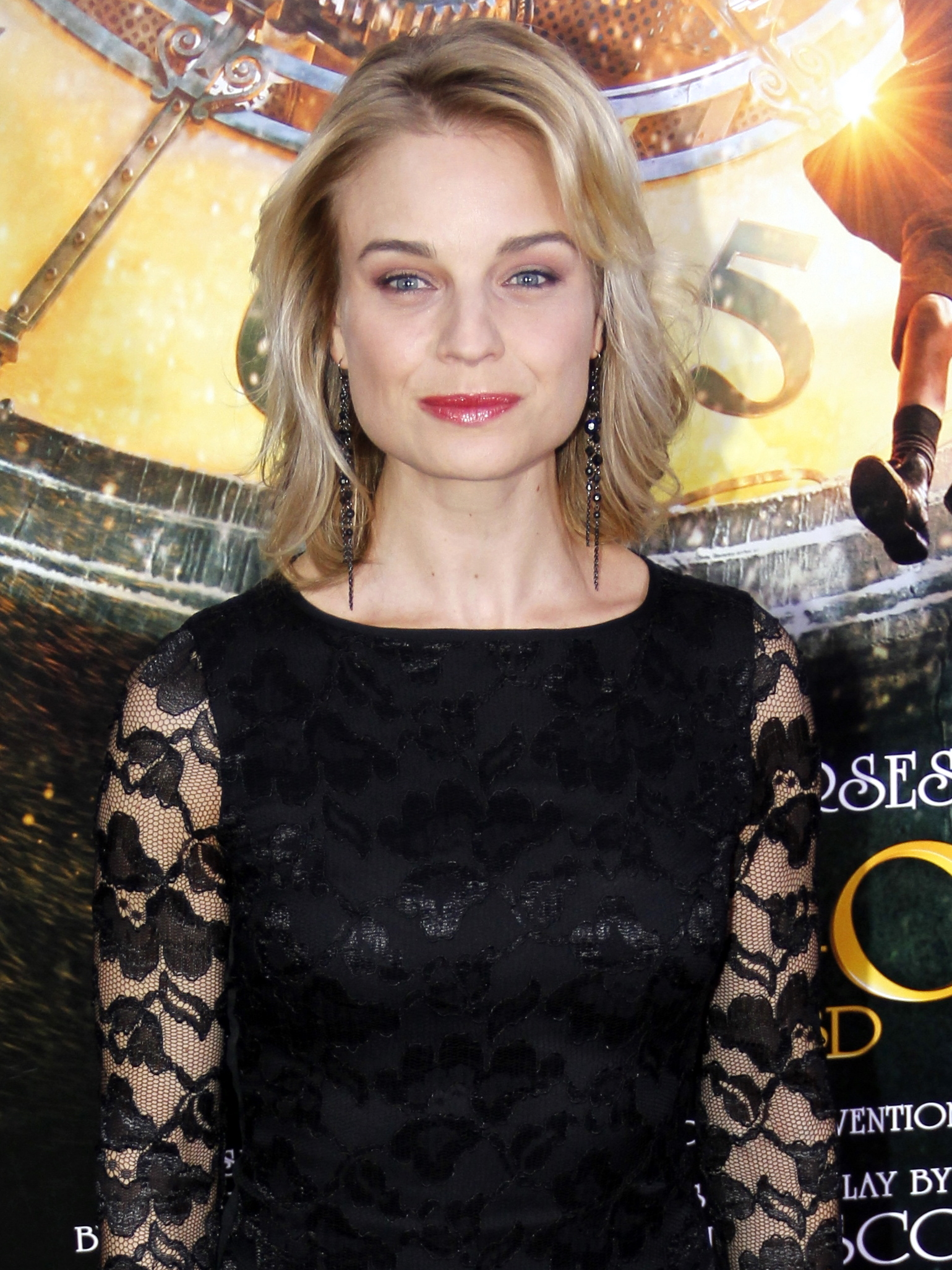
- Yelland in 2011
- Born: 1976 (age 49–50); Hammersmith, London, United Kingdom
- Citizenship: British
- Occupation: Actress
- Years active: 1999–present
- Website: www.hannahyelland.com

Hannah Yelland (born in 1976) is a British-born actress. She lives and works in the United States.

== Early life ==
Hannah Yelland was born in Hammersmith, west London, and brought up in Richmond, Surbiton and East Molesey. She is the daughter of British actor David Yelland. Yelland was educated at local state comprehensive schools, followed by St. Catharine's College at the University of Cambridge, where she studied English.

== Career ==
She appeared onstage with her father, in a 2007/08 revival of The Life and Adventures of Nicholas Nickleby. Her other stage work includes starring as Laura in the Broadway production of Brief Encounter, for which she was nominated for a 2011 Tony Award for Best Leading Actress in a Play.

In April 2012, Yelland made her debut at Dublin's Gate Theatre, appearing in the title role in My Cousin Rachel, in an adaptation by Joseph O'Connor. Most recently, she played Hermione in the critically acclaimed production of The Winter's Tale, directed by Rebecca Taichman for the McCarter Theatre, Princeton, and the Shakespeare Theatre Company, Washington DC.

== Personal life ==
In August 2010, she married Michael Bahar, a U.S. Naval Officer and former Deputy Legal Advisor to the National Security Staff at the White House. The two divide their time between Washington DC and New York City.

== Partial filmography ==
- Catherine Cookson's The Secret (1999)
- The Bill (1999)
- A Touch of Frost (1999)
- Agatha Christie's Poirot (Lord Edgware Dies, 2000)
- Dinotopia (2002)
- AKA (2002)
- The Project (2002)
- Bodies (2004)
- Ultimate Force (2005)
- Dalziel and Pascoe (2006)
- Father Brown ("The River Corrupted" (2020) Episode 8.7)
