= Wolverhampton machete attack =

July 1996 machete attack in Wolverhampton, UK

Coordinates: 52°34′17″N 2°07′43″W

- Location: Wolverhampton, England
- Date: 8 July 1996; 3:15 pm (BST)
- Target: Pupils and staff at St Luke's Church of England infants' school
- Attack type: Mass slashing
- Weapon: Machete
- Deaths: 0
- Injuries: 7
- Perpetrator: Horrett Irving Campbell

The Wolverhampton machete attack occurred at St Luke's Church of England infants' school, on 8 July 1996. While the children were having an outdoor teddy bear picnic, the attacker, 32-year-old Horrett Irving Campbell, leapt over a fence and began attacking the children and adults with a machete. Three children and four adults were injured in the attack.

== Attack ==
Shortly after 15:00 on 8 July 1996, parents and teachers at St Luke's School were organising a teddy bear picnic to celebrate the end of the school term. A man described as being in his mid-30s with a slight build whom parents had seen hanging around the bushes prior to the attack, jumped over a fence surrounding the children's play area and pulled out a large machete. As parents attempted to distract and stop the attacker, he calmly began slashing the machete indiscriminately at the adults and children. Three children and four adults, most notably Lisa Potts, were injured in the attack. Potts was a 21-year-old teacher at the school who suffered cuts to her head, back, arms, and one of her arms was almost severed in the attack. A parent chased the man out of the area towards a housing area known as Villiers Flats. Police surrounded the area, and approximately two hours later took away a man who turned out to be someone other than the assailant. The following day, after hours of searching the area, police arrested 32-year-old Horrett Irving Campbell in connection with the attack.

== Perpetrator ==
Horrett Irving Campbell was a 32-year-old man who lived across from St Luke' School in the nearby flats. Neighbours reported that he was unemployed and spent much of his time fixing his Volvo. He had previously been arrested for appearing in public with a machete strapped to his leg, but was not considered to be dangerous. He reportedly admired Thomas Hamilton, the perpetrator of the Dunblane massacre which had taken place four months before, and kept a picture of him on his wall along with one of Martin Bryant, perpetrator of the Port Arthur massacre in Australia.

At his trial, psychiatrist James Collins testified that Campbell was a schizophrenic who believed that the children were talking about him, and that the parents of the children had given information to the police about him. Campbell was also under the delusion that performing this attack would help rid him of a ghost which had haunted him for years. On 7 March 1997, judge Justice Sedley sent Campbell to a mental hospital for an indefinite period.

== Aftermath ==
Potts underwent several surgeries to repair the damage suffered in the attack, and received an initial award of £49,000 by the Criminal Injuries Compensation Appeals Panel, which was increased on 10 November 2001 to £68,000. An award from the panel to the children was eventually increased from £750 to £20,000 each. Potts received the George Medal from Queen Elizabeth II in 1997 for her actions in defending the children.
