= Philip Lawrence Awards =

The Philip Lawrence Awards were created in the UK in 1997 to reward good citizenship by young people aged 11 to 20. They recognise contributions to the community.

They commemorate the headmaster Philip Lawrence, who was murdered outside his school in 1995 when going to the aid of a pupil who was being attacked. His widow, Frances Lawrence, was appointed Member of the Order of the British Empire (MBE) in the 2009 Birthday Honours for services to charity for her role in setting up the awards.

The awards have always been funded by the Home Office, and since 2009 have been co-funded by the Department for Education. They are currently managed by young people's charity Catch22.
