= British Academy Television Award for Best Entertainment Programme =

Annual UK television award

British Academy Television Award
- Country: United Kingdom
- Presented by: British Academy of Film and Television Arts
- First award: 1971
- Currently held by: LOL: Last One Laughing UK (2026)

Highlights
- Most wins: Ant & Dec's Saturday Night Takeaway (4)
- Website: http://www.bafta.org/

The British Academy Television Award for Best Entertainment Programme is one of the major categories of the British Academy Television Awards (BAFTAs), the primary awards ceremony of the British television industry. According to the BAFTA website, the category "includes quizzes, game shows, talent shows, music specials and all general entertainment programmes."

The category has been through several name and category changes:

- From 1958 to 1970 it was presented as an individual award named Best Light Entertainment.
- In 1971 the name was changed to Best Light Entertainment Programme and in 1992 it was changed again to Best Light Entertainment Programme or Series.
- Since 2000 the category is presented under the name of Best Entertainment Programme.

== Winners and nominees ==
=== 1950s ===
Best Light Entertainment

Year	Recipient(s)
1958	Brian Tesler
1959	Joan Kemp-Welch

=== 1960s ===
Best Light Entertainment

Year	Recipient(s)	Title
1960	Bill Ward	
1961	Ned Sherrin	
1962	George Inns	
1963	Duncan Wood	
1964	Colin Clews	
1965	Francis Essex	
1966	Joe McGrath	Not Only... But Also; The Big Noise
1966	Ken Carter	The Benny Hill Show; The Lance Percival Show
1966	Terry Henebery	Jazz 625; Torme's Back in Town; Ella Fitzgerald; Jazz Scene USA; Commonwealth Jazz Club
1966	Dennis Main Wilson	Scott on Birds; Scott on Money; The Roy Castle Show; Here I Come Whoever I Am; Till Death Do Us Part
1967	Ned Sherrin, John Bird	
1968	Ned Sherrin	
1969	Dennis Main Wilson	Marty; Till Death Do Us Part

=== 1970s ===
Best Light Entertainment

Year	Title	Recipient(s)	Broadcaster
1970	Just Pet	Yvonne Littlewood	BBC
1970	Please Sir!	Mark Stuart	ITV
1970	Bobbie Gentry: The Price of Fame	Stanley Dorfman	BBC
1970	The World of Beachcomber	Duncan Wood	BBC
1970	Dad's Army	David Croft	BBC One
1970	Monty Python's Flying Circus	John Howard Davies, Ian McNaughton	BBC One
1970	Not in Front of the Children	Graeme Muir	BBC One

Best Light Entertainment Programme

Year	Title	Recipient(s)	Broadcaster
1971	Dad's Army	David Croft and team	BBC One
1971	The Benny Hill Show	John Robins	ITV
1971	The Morecambe and Wise Show	John Ammonds	ITV
1971	Monty Python's Flying Circus	Ian McNaughton	BBC One
1971	Up Pompeii!	David Croft	BBC One
1972	The Benny Hill Show	John Robins, David Bell	ITV
1972	The Goodies	John Howard Davies	BBC Two
1972	The Two Ronnies	Terry Hughes	BBC One
1972	The Comedians	Johnny Hamp	ITV
1973	Monty Python's Flying Circus	Ian McNaughton and the production team	BBC One
1973	Dave Allen at Large	Peter Whitmore	BBC Two
1973	The Two Ronnies	Terry Hughes	BBC One
1974	The Stanley Baxter Big Picture Show	David Bell	ITV
1974	Dave Allen at Large	Peter Whitmore	BBC Two
1974	The Morecambe and Wise Show	John Ammonds	ITV
1974	The Two Ronnies	Terry Hughes	BBC One
1975	The Stanley Baxter Moving Picture Show	David Bell	ITV
1975	The Two Ronnies	Terry Hughes	BBC One
1975	The Benny Hill Show	John Robins, Mark Stuart	ITV
1975	Monty Python	Ian MacNaughton	BBC Two
1976	The Two Ronnies	Terry Hughes	BBC One
1976	The Stanley Baxter Moving Picture Show Part III	Jon Scoffield	ITV
1976	Dave Allen at Large	Peter Whitmore	BBC Two
1976	The Goodies	Jim Franklin	BBC Two
1977	The Muppet Show	Production Team	ITV
1977	The Two Ronnies	Terry Hughes	BBC One
1977	The Morecambe and Wise Show	Ernest Maxin	BBC One
1977	Mastermind	Bill Wright	BBC One
1978	Morecambe and Wise Christmas Show	Ernest Maxin	BBC One
1978	The Muppet Show	Jim Henson	ITV
1978	The Two Ronnies	Peter Whitmore	BBC One
1978	Mike Yarwood in Persons	John Ammonds	BBC One
1979	The Kenny Everett Video Show	David Mallet	ITV
1979	The Two Ronnies	Peter Whitmore	BBC One
1979	The Good Life (Special)	John Howard Davies	BBC One
1979	The Muppet Show	Jim Henson	ITV

=== 1980s ===
Best Light Entertainment Programme

Year	Title	Recipient(s)	Broadcaster
1980	Ripping Yarns	Alan Bell, Jim Franklin	BBC Two
1980	The Kenny Everett Video Show	David Mallet	ITV
1980	The Muppet Show	Jim Henson	ITV
1980	The Two Ronnies	Peter Whitmore	BBC One
1981	Not the Nine O'Clock News	John Lloyd, Sean Hardie, Bill Wilson	BBC Two
1981	The Kenny Everett Video Show	David Mallet	ITV
1981	An Audience with Dame Edna Everage	Alasdair Macmillan	ITV
1981	The Two Ronnies	Michael Hurll, K Paul Jackson	BBC One
1982	The Stanley Baxter Series	David Bell, John Kaye Cooper	ITV
1982	The Two Ronnies	Paul Jackson	BBC One
1982	The Kenny Everett Video Show	Royston Mayoh	ITV
1982	Wood and Walters	Peter Eckersley, Stuart Orme	ITV
1983	Three of a Kind	Paul Jackson	BBC One
1983	Not the Nine O'Clock News	John Lloyd, Sean Hardie	BBC Two
1983	The Two Ronnies	Paul Jackson	BBC One
1983	The Stanley Baxter Hour	John Kaye Cooper	ITV
1984	Carrott's Lib	Geoff Posner	BBC One
1984	The Kenny Everett Television Show	Bill Wilson	ITV
1984	The Two Ronnies	Marcus Plantin	BBC One
1984	Three of a Kind	Paul Jackson	BBC One
1985	An Audience with Dame Edna Everage	Richard Drewett	ITV
1985	The Hot Shoe Show	Tom Gutteridge	BBC One
1985	Yes, Minister (Special: Party Games)	Peter Whitmore	BBC Two
1985	Spitting Image	Jon Blair, Tony Hendra, John Lloyd	ITV
1986	Victoria Wood As Seen On TV	Geoff Posner	BBC Two
1986	Spitting Image	John Lloyd	ITV
1986	Alas Smith and Jones	John Kilby, Jimmy Mulville	BBC Two
1986	Treasure Hunt	Peter Holrnans, Malcolm Heyworth	Channel 4
1987	Victoria Wood As Seen On TV	Geoff Posner	BBC Two
1987	Spitting Image	John Lloyd, Geoffrey Perkins	ITV
1987	Clive James on Television	Nicholas Barrett	ITV
1987	Alas Smith and Jones	John Kilby	BBC Two
1987	Entertainment USA	Gordon Elsbury	BBC Two
1987	Who Dares Wins	Denise O'Donoghue, Andy Hamilton	BBC One
1988	Victoria Wood On TV Special	Geoff Posner	BBC Two
1988	Alas Smith and Jones	John Kilby, Jamie Rix	BBC Two
1988	Spitting Image	Geoffrey Perkins	ITV
1988	The Dame Edna Experience	Richard Drewett, Judith Holder	ITV
1989	An Audience With Victoria Wood	David G. Hillier	ITV
1989	French and Saunders	Geoff Posner, Kevin Bishop	BBC Two
1989	The Lenny Henry Show	Geoff Posner	BBC One
1989	Spitting Image	Geoffrey Perkins	ITV

=== 1990s ===
Best Light Entertainment Programme

Year	Title	Recipient(s)	Broadcaster
1990	Clive James on the '80s	Elaine Bedell, Richard Drewett	ITV
1990	Whose Line Is It Anyway?	Dan Patterson, Chris Bould	Channel 4
1990	The Dame Edna Experience	Claudia Rosencrantz, Alasdair Macmillan	ITV
1990	Victoria Wood	Geoff Posner, Kevin Bishop	BBC One
1991	Whose Line Is It Anyway?	Dan Patterson, Chris Bould	Channel 4
1991	French and Saunders	Jon Plowman, Bob Spiers	BBC Two
1991	Mr. Bean	John Howard Davies	ITV
1991	Spitting Image	Bill Dare	ITV

Best Light Entertainment Programme or Series

Year	Title	Recipient(s)	Broadcaster
1992	Have I Got News for You	Harry Thompson	BBC Two
1992	Spitting Image	Bill Dare, Steve Bendelack, Andy De Emmony	ITV
1992	Julie Walters and Friends	Alasdair Macmillan, Nicholas Barrett	ITV
1992	Whose Line Is It Anyway?	Dan Patterson, Chris Bould	Channel 4
1993	Noel's House Party	Michael Leggo	BBC One
1993	Harry Enfield's Television Programme	Geoffrey Perkins, Geoff Posner	
1993	Have I Got News for You	Harry Thompson	BBC Two
1993	Whose Line Is It Anyway?	Dan Patterson, Chris Bould	Channel 4
1994	Rory Bremner... Who Else?	Geoff Atkinson, Elaine Morris, Steve Connelly, Tom Poole	Channel 4
1994	Barrymore	Maurice Leonard, John Gorman	ITV
1994	French and Saunders	Jon Plowman, Bob Spiers	BBC One
1994	Noel's House Party	Michael Leggo, Jonathan Beazley	BBC One
1995	Don't Forget Your Toothbrush	Lisa Clark, Stephen Stewart	Channel 4
1995	Knowing Me, Knowing You... With Alan Partridge	Armando Iannucci, Dominic Brigstocke	BBC Two
1995	Rory Bremner... Who Else?	Geoff Atkinson, Elaine Morris, Steve Connelly, Juliet May	Channel 4
1995	Smashie and Nicey: The End of an Era	Alison Owen, Daniel Kleinman	BBC One
1996	The Mrs Merton Show	Peter Kessler, Pati Marr, Dominic Brigstocke	BBC Two
1996	Have I Got News for You	Colin Swash, John FD Northover	BBC Two
1996	Shooting Stars	Alan Marke, Mark Mylod	BBC Two
1996	Rory Bremner... Who Else?	Geoff Atkinson, Elaine Morris, Steve Connelly, David Crean	Channel 4
1997	Shooting Stars	Alan Marke, Mark Mylod	BBC Two
1997	Rory Bremner... Who Else?	Geoff Atkinson, Elaine Morris, Steve Smith, Steve Connelly	Channel 4
1997	The Fast Show	Paul Whitehouse, Charlie Higson, Sid Robeson, Mark Mylod	BBC Two
1997	Ruby Wax Meets	Clive Tulloh, Don Boyd	BBC
1998	The Fast Show	Charlie Higson, Paul Whitehouse, Mark Mylod	BBC Two
1998	Harry Enfield and Chums	Sophie Clarke-Jervoise, Dominic Brigstocke	BBC One
1998	Harry Hill	Charlie Hanson, Robin Nash	Channel 4
1998	Have I Got News for You	Colin Swash, Richard Wilson	BBC Two
1999	Who Wants to Be a Millionaire?	Paul Smith, Guy Freeman, Martin Scott	ITV
1999	Big Train	Sioned Wiliam, Graham Linehan, Arthur Mathews	BBC Two
1999	Goodness Gracious Me	Anil Gupta, Nick Wood	BBC Two
1999	Rory Bremner... Who Else?	Geoff Atkinson, Jon Magnusson, Geraldine Dowd, Henry Murray	Channel 4

=== 2000s ===
Best Entertainment Programme

Year	Title	Recipient(s)	Broadcaster
2000	Robbie The Reindeer: Hooves of Fire		BBC One
2000	So Graham Norton	Graham Stuart, Jon Magnusson, Steve Smith	Channel 4
2000	Have I Got News for You	Colin Swash, Richard Wilson, Giles Pilbrow	BBC Two
2000	Robot Wars	Tom Gutteridge, Stephen Carsey, Bill Hobbins	BBC Two
2001	So Graham Norton	Graham Stuart, Jon Magnusson, Steve Smith	Channel 4
2001	Have I Got News for You	Giles Pilbrow, Colin Swash, Richard Wilson	BBC One
2001	Who Wants to Be a Millionaire?	Paul Smith, Colman Hutchinson	ITV
2001	The Weakest Link	David Young, Ruth Davis, Richard Valentine	BBC Two
2002	Pop Idol	Claire Horton, Ken Warwick, Jonathan Bullen	ITV
2002	Have I Got News for You	Colin Swash, Richard Wilson, Nick Martin, Paul Wheeler	BBC One
2002	Parkinson	Beatrice Ballard, Stuart McDonald	BBC One
2002	Room 101	Richard Wilson, Victoria Payne, Geraldine Dowd	BBC Two
2003	I'm a Celebrity...Get Me Out of Here!		ITV
2003	Friday Night with Jonathan Ross	Suzi Aplin, Mick Thomas, Jonathan Ross	BBC One
2003	Test the Nation	Nichola Hegarty, John Kaye Cooper, Simon Staffurth	BBC One
2003	The Kumars at No. 42	Lissa Evans, Richard Pinto, Sharat Sardana	BBC Two
2004	Friday Night with Jonathan Ross	Addison Cresswell, Suzi Aplin, Mick Thomas	BBC One
2004	Ant and Dec's Saturday Night Takeaway	James Sunderland, Chris Power	ITV
2004	Pop Idol	Richard Holloway, Claire Horton, Jonathan Bullen	ITV
2004	Have I Got News for You	Richard Wilson, Nick Martin, Steve Doherty	BBC One
2005	I'm a Celebrity...Get Me Out of Here!		ITV
2005	Friday Night with Jonathan Ross	Addison Cresswell, Suzi Aplin, Mick Thomas	BBC One
2005	Strictly Come Dancing	Karen Smith, Richard Hopkins, Izzie Pick	BBC One
2005	QI	John Lloyd, Ian Lorimer	BBC Two
2006	The X Factor		ITV
2006	Friday Night with Jonathan Ross		BBC One
2006	Have I Got News for You	Richard Wilson, Nick Martin, Jo Bunting	BBC One
2006	Strictly Come Dancing	Karen Smith, Richard Hopkins, Sam Donnelly	BBC One
2007	The X Factor	Richard Holloway, Claire Horton, Andrew Llinares, Siobhan Greene	ITV
2007	Derren Brown: The Heist	Derren Brown, Simon Mills, Andy Nyman, Ben Caron	Channel 4
2007	Dancing on Ice		ITV
2007	How Do You Solve a Problem Like Maria?		BBC One
2008	Harry Hill's TV Burp	Spencer Millman, Peter Orton, Harry Hill	ITV
2008	Britain's Got Talent	Richard Holloway, Andrew Llinares, Ben Thursby, Georgie Hurford-Jones	ITV
2008	Have I Got News for You	Jo Bunting, Nick Martin, Richard Wilson	BBC One
2008	Strictly Come Dancing	Martin Scott, Sam Donnelly, Clodagh O'Donoghue	BBC One
2009	The X Factor	Richard Holloway, Andrew Llinares, Siobhan Greene, Mark Sidaway	ITV
2009	Friday/Sunday Night Project	Dean Nabarro, Richard Ackerman, Henrietta Conrad, Andrew Westwell	Channel 4
2009	Harry Hill's TV Burp	Harry Hill, Peter Orton, Spencer Millman	ITV
2009	QI	John Lloyd, Piers Fletcher, Ian Lorimer	BBC One

=== 2010s ===
Year	Title	Recipient(s)	Broadcaster
2010	Britain's Got Talent		ITV
2010	The Graham Norton Show	Graham Norton, Jon Magnusson, Graham Stuart, Steve Smith	BBC One
2010	Harry Hill's TV Burp	Harry Hill, Peter Orton, Spencer Millman	ITV
2010	Newswipe with Charlie Brooker	Charlie Brooker, Annabel Jones, Nick Vaughan-Smith, Al Campbell	BBC Four
2011	The Cube	Adam Adler, Nathan Eastwood, Andrew Newman, Andrew O'Connor	ITV1
2011	The Graham Norton Show	Graham Norton, Jon Magnusson, Graham Stuart, Steve Smith	BBC One
2011	Have I Got News for You	Richard Wilson, Jo Bunting, Nick Martin, Mark Barrett	BBC One
2011	The X Factor	Andrew Llinares, Mark Sidaway, Nigel Hall, Richard Holloway	ITV1
2012	Derren Brown: The Experiments	Derren Brown, Fiona Cotter-Craig, Simon Dinsell, Iain Sharkey	Channel 4
2012	Celebrity Juice	Toby Baker, Dan Baldwin, Ed Sleeman, Leon Wilson	ITV2
2012	Harry Hill's TV Burp	Harry Hill, Peter Orton, Spencer Millman	ITV
2012	Michael McIntyre's Christmas Comedy Roadshow	Andrew Beint, Anthony Caveney, Addison Cresswell, Michael McIntyre	BBC One
2013	The Graham Norton Show	Graham Norton, Jon Magnusson, Graham Stuart, Steve Smith	BBC One
2013	Dynamo Magician Impossible	Steven Frayne, Mark McQueen, Lucy Ansbro, Dan Albion	Watch
2013	Have I Got News for You	Richard Wilson, Jo Bunting, Nick Martin, Ben Wicks	BBC One
2013	A League of Their Own	Murray Boland, Danielle Lux, Jim Pullin, David Taylor	Sky1
2014	Ant & Dec's Saturday Night Takeaway		ITV
2014	Strictly Come Dancing		BBC One
2014	Dynamo: Magician Impossible	Lucy Ansbro, Dan Albion, Alex Hartman, Debbie Young	Watch
2014	Derren Brown: The Great Art Robbery		Channel 4
2015	Ant & Dec's Saturday Night Takeaway		ITV
2015	Strictly Come Dancing	Louise Rainbow, Nikki Parsons, Vanessa Clark, Jason Gilkison	BBC One
2015	The Voice	Moira Ross, John de Mol, Clodagh O'Donoghue, Ed Booth	BBC One
2015	Dynamo: Magician Impossible	Lucy Ansbro, Dan Albion, Alex Hartman, Debbie Young	Watch
2016	Strictly Come Dancing	Louise Rainbow, Vinnie Shergill, Sarah James, Nikki Parsons	BBC One
2016	Adele at the BBC	Adele Adkins, Guy Freeman, Anouk Fontaine, Simon Staffurth	BBC One
2016	Britain's Got Talent	Richard Holloway, Amelia Brown, Lee McNicholas, Matt Banks	ITV
2016	TFI Friday Anniversary Special	Will MacDonald, Clare Barton, Suzi Aplin	Channel 4
2017	Ant & Dec's Saturday Night Takeaway		ITV
2017	Michael McIntyre's Big Show	Christian Fletcher, Dan Baldwin, Claire Horton, Chris Howe	BBC One
2017	Britain's Got Talent	Richard Holloway, Amelia Brown, Lee McNicholas, Clair Breen	ITV
2017	Strictly Come Dancing		BBC One
2018	Britain's Got Talent	Amelia Brown, Lee McNicholas, Richard Holloway, Charlie Irwin	ITV
2018	Michael McIntyre's Big Show	Christian Fletcher, Dan Baldwin, Claire Horton, Michael McIntyre	BBC One
2018	Ant & Dec's Saturday Night Takeaway	Pete Ogden, Saul Fearnley, Diego Rincon, Andy Milligan	ITV
2018	The Voice UK		ITV
2019	Britain's Got Talent	Charlie Irwin, Amelia Brown, Nigel Hall, Dawn Gray	ITV
2019	Michael McIntyre's Big Show	Christian Fletcher, Dan Baldwin, Claire Horton, Michael McIntyre	BBC One
2019	Strictly Come Dancing	Louise Rainbow, Sarah James, Robin Lee-Perrella, Jason Gilkison	BBC One
2019	Ant & Dec's Saturday Night Takeaway	Pete Ogden, Saul Fearnley, Tom Locking, Helen Kruger Bratt	ITV

=== 2020s ===
Year	Title	Recipient(s)	Broadcaster
2020	Strictly Come Dancing		BBC One
2020	The Rap Game UK	Tom O'Brien, Simon Andreae, Tom Whitrow, Susie Dark	BBC Three
2020	The Greatest Dancer	Amelia Brown, Phil Harris, Nigel Hall, Louise Hutchinson	BBC One
2020	The Voice UK		ITV
2021	Life & Rhymes		Sky Arts
2021	Strictly Come Dancing		BBC One
2021	Ant & Dec's Saturday Night Takeaway	Pete Ogden, Tim Dean, Ben Aston, Doran Azouelos, Kerry Shaw, Chris Power	ITV
2021	The Masked Singer	Daniel Nettleton, Derek McLean, Claire Horton, Marc Bassett, Simon Staffurth	ITV
2022	Ant & Dec's Saturday Night Takeaway		ITV
2022	Life & Rhymes		Sky Arts
2022	An Audience with Adele	Adele, Jonathan Dickins, Sally Wood, Ben Winston, Lou Fox, Bex Hampson	ITV
2022	Strictly Come Dancing		BBC One
2023	The Masked Singer	Derek McLean, Daniel Nettleton, Claire Horton, Diccon Ramsay	ITV
2023	Later... with Jools Holland: Jools' 30th Birthday Bash		BBC Two
2023	Ant & Dec's Saturday Night Takeaway		ITV
2023	Strictly Come Dancing		BBC One
2024	Strictly Come Dancing		BBC One
2024	Hannah Waddingham: Home for Christmas	Hannah Waddingham, Hamish Hamilton, Katy Mullan, Moira Ross, Raj Kapoor, Nick Todisco	Apple TV+
2024	Later... with Jools Holland		BBC Two
2024	Michael McIntyre's Big Show		BBC One
2025	Would I Lie to You?	Peter Holmes, Rachel Ablett, Barbara Wiltshire, Jake Graham, Zoe Waterman, Charlotte Bracey-Curant	BBC One
2025	The 1% Club	Dean Nabarro, Andy Auerbach, Richard van’t Riet, Clare Barton, Hennie Clough	ITV1
2025	Michael McIntyre's Big Show		BBC One
2025	Taskmaster	Andy Devonshire, Andy Cartwright, James Taylor, Alex Horne, Jon Thoday	Channel 4
2026	LOL: Last One Laughing UK		Prime Video
2026	The Graham Norton Show	Graham Norton, Graham Stuart, Jon Magnusson, Toby Baker, Catherine Strauss, Pete Snell	BBC One
2026	Michael McIntyre's Big Show		BBC One
2026	Would I Lie to You?	Peter Holmes, Rachel Ablett, Jake Graham, Zoe Waterman, Barbara Wiltshire, Debra Blenkinsop	BBC One
