= 1860 in the United Kingdom =

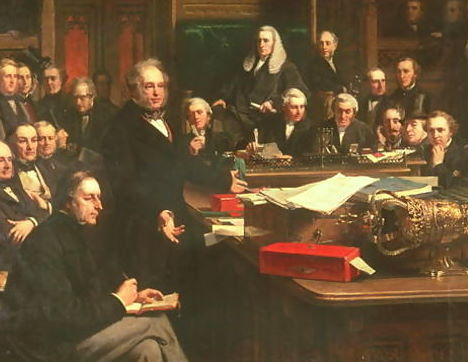
Lord Palmerston Addressing the House of Commons During the Debates on the Treaty of France on 1st February

Events from the year 1860 in the United Kingdom.

== Incumbents ==
- Monarch – Victoria
- Prime Minister – Henry John Temple, 3rd Viscount Palmerston (Liberal)

== Events ==
- 1 January – Cray Wanderers Football Club formed in St Mary Cray, north Kent.
- 25 January – HMS Prince of Wales, a 121-gun screw-propelled first-rate ship of the line is launched at Portsmouth Dockyard.
- February – Royal Commission on the Defence of the United Kingdom recommends an erection of the Palmerston Forts.
- 27 February – The paddle steamer Nimrod is wrecked off St David's Head in Wales and 45 people are killed.
- 28 February – The Artists Rifles is established, as the 38th Middlesex (Artists) Rifle Volunteer Corps, with headquarters at Burlington House in London.
- March – The Food and Drink Act 1860 prohibits the adulteration of certain foodstuffs.
- 7 March – HMS Howe, the Royal Navy's last, largest and fastest wooden first-rate three-decker ship of the line, is launched at Pembroke Dockyard but never completed for sea service.
- 17 March – The First Taranaki War between the Māori and British colonists in New Zealand begins.
- 17 April – One of the last major bare-knuckle boxing matches in England, and the first major international, between Tom Sayers and American heavyweight John C. Heenan at Farnborough, Hampshire, ends in a draw as police arrive to break up the event.
- 22 April – The Eastbourne manslaughter occurs.
- 28 May – One of the worst storms ever experienced in the region hits the east coast of England, sinking more than 100 ships and killing at least 40 people.
- 30 June – A historic debate about evolution is held, at the Oxford University Museum.
- 9 July – The Nightingale Training School and Home for Nurses, the first nursing school based on the ideas of Florence Nightingale, is opened at St Thomas' Hospital in London.
- 22 August – The British navy assists the troops of Giuseppe Garibaldi to cross from Sicily to the mainland of Italy.
- 30 August – The first street trams in Britain are introduced in Birkenhead.
- October – John Hanning Speke and James Augustus Grant leave Zanzibar to search for source of the Nile.
- 5 October – Austria, Britain, France, Prussia and the Ottoman Empire form a commission to investigate causes of the massacres of Maronite Christians, committed by Druzes in Lebanon earlier in the year.
- 17 October – The first professional golf tournament is held at Prestwick in Scotland, sometimes regarded as the first Open, although it is not truly open until the following year.
- 18 October – Second Opium War:
  - Lord Elgin orders his forces to set fire to the huge complex of Beijing's Old Summer Palace, known as the Gardens of Perfect Brightness, which burns to the ground.
  - The first Convention of Peking formally ends the War.
- November – The 'Temporary Home for Lost and Starving Dogs', predecessor of the Battersea Dogs and Cats Home, is established in London by Mary Tealby.
- 1 December
  - Charles Dickens publishes the first installment of Great Expectations in his magazine All the Year Round.
  - The sixth underground explosion in the Risca Black Vein Pit at Crosskeys in the Sirhowy Valley of Monmouthshire kills 142 coal miners.
- 26 December – The first Rules derby is held between Sheffield F.C. and Hallam F.C., the oldest football fixture in the world.
- 29 December – The world's first ocean-going (all) iron-hulled and armoured battleship, HMS Warrior is launched on the Thames.

=== Undated ===
  - Britain produces 20% of the entire world's output of industrial goods.
  - First recorded fish and chip shops in the UK, Joseph Malin's in London and John Lees' in Mossley near Oldham, Lancashire.

== Publications ==
- Wilkie Collins' sensation novel The Woman in White (serialisation concludes and book publication).
- Charles Dickens's novel Great Expectations (serialisation begins).
- George Eliot's novel The Mill on the Floss.
- Thomas Love Peacock's last novel Gryll Grange (serialisation).
- Robert Smith Surtees' comic novel Plain or Ringlets? (concludes publication).
- Anthony Trollope's novels Framley Parsonage (serialisation in the new Cornhill Magazine) and Castle Richmond.
- The collection of broad-church essays on Christianity Essays and Reviews.
- The Western Morning News is first published (Plymouth, 3 January).

== Births ==
- 8 January – Emma Booth-Tucker, Salvationist (died 1903 in the United States)
- 21 February – Goscombe John, Welsh sculptor (died 1952)
- 25 February – William Ashley, economic historian (died 1927)
- 6 March – Frederick George Jackson, Arctic explorer (died 1938)
- 22 March – John George Bartholomew, Scottish cartographer (died 1920)
- 9 April – Emily Hobhouse, humanitarian, feminist and pacifist (died 1926)
- 2 May
  - William Bayliss, physiologist (died 1924)
  - John Scott Haldane, Scottish physiologist (died 1936)
  - D'Arcy Wentworth Thompson, Scottish biologist (died 1948)
- 7 May – Tom Norman, showman (died 1930)
- 9 May – J. M. Barrie, author (died 1937)
- 30 May – Archibald Thorburn, wildlife painter (died 1935)
- 6 June – William Inge, dean and theologian (died 1954)
- 13 June – Lancelot Speed, illustrator (died 1931)
- 25 June – Sutherland Macdonald, tattoo artist (died 1942)
- 20 July – Margaret McMillan, American-born pioneer of nursery education (died 1931)
- 22 July – Frederick Rolfe, writer and artist (died 1913)
- 31 July – George Warrender, admiral (died 1917)
- 3 August – W. K. Dickson, inventor (died 1935)
- 5 August – Louis Wain, humorous artist (died 1939)
- 7 August – Alan Leo, born William F. Allan, astrologer (died 1917)
- 11 September – Ben Tillett, trade union leader (died 1943)
- 22 November – Etta Lemon, born Smith, bird conservationist (died 1953)
- 8 December – Amanda McKittrick Ros, born Anna McKittrick, Irish novelist and poet noted for her purple prose (died 1939)
- 20 December – Dan Leno, music hall comedian (died 1904)

== Deaths ==
- 1 January – Thomas Hobbes Scott, clergyman (born 1783)
- 27 January – Sir Thomas Brisbane, astronomer (born 1773)
- 9 February – William Evans Burton, dramatist, theatre manager and publisher (born 1804)
- 17 March – Anna Brownell Jameson, cultural historian (born 1794)
- 25 March – James Braid, surgeon (born 1795)
- 4 May – William Ormsby-Gore, politician (born 1779)
- 12 May – Sir Charles Barry, architect (born 1795)
- 16 May – Anne Isabella Milbanke, wife of George Gordon Byron, 6th Baron Byron (born 1792)
- 11 June – Baden Powell, mathematician and Church of England priest (born 1796)
- 29 June – Thomas Addison, physician (born 1793)
- 17 July – Betsi Cadwaladr, Crimea nurse (born 1789)
- 2 August – Sir Henry Ward, diplomat, politician and colonial administrator (born 1797)
- 3 August – Sir Henry Wyndham, British Army General and Conservative Party politician (born 1790)
- 12 October – Sir Harry Smith, 1st Baronet, military commander (born 1787)
- 31 October – Thomas Cochrane, 10th Earl of Dundonald, admiral (born 1775)
- 11 December – Anne Knight, children's writer and educationist (born 1792)
- 14 December – George Hamilton-Gordon, 4th Earl of Aberdeen, Prime Minister of the United Kingdom (born 1784)
