= Julie Walters and Friends =

- Genre: Comedy
- Written by: Victoria Wood; Alan Bennett; Willy Russell; Alan Bleasdale
- Directed by: Alisdair Macmillan
- Starring: Julie Walters
- Country of origin: United Kingdom
- No. of episodes: 1

Production
- Producer: Nicholas Barrett
- Running time: 55 minutes
- Production company: LWT

Original release
- Network: ITV
- Release: 29 December 1991

Related
- Victoria Wood: As Seen on TV

Julie Walters and Friends is a fifty-five minute long, one-off comedy sketch show showcasing the talents of actress Julie Walters. Sketches were written by Walters' frequent collaborators: Victoria Wood, Alan Bennett, Willy Russell and Alan Bleasdale. Walters features in every sketch, mostly portraying new characters, though in one, she reprises Mrs Murray, her character from G.B.H., written by Bleasdale.

== Sketches ==
Part 1:

- "Jayne Mansfield's Balls", written by and featuring Victoria Wood
- Tribute from Victoria Wood
- "Mary Brazzle", written by Victoria Wood

Part 2:

- "Seating Arrangements", written by and featuring Victoria Wood
- Tribute from Alan Bennett
- "A Wife of Crime", written by Alan Bennett
- "Between the Lines", song written by Victoria Wood
- Tribute from Willy Russell
- "I Hate Poets", written by and featuring Willy Russell

Part 3:

- "A People Person", written by and featuring Victoria Wood
- "Tales of Old", written by and featuring Victoria Wood
- Tribute from Alan Bleasdale
- "All About Michael", written by Alan Bleasdale
- "1920s Old Bag", written by Victoria Wood

Titles for sketches and songs taken from the DVD liner notes. Other sources published by the writers at the time of the broadcast used alternative titles. Alan Bennett's sketch was referred to as My Niche; Victoria Wood's song was referred to as A Modern Romance; Willy Russell's sketch was Bring Back Hughie Green; and the final two sketches by Wood in Part 3 were Blackcurrant Sorbet and A Decent Send Off. The opening sketch was always referred to by Wood by the DVD title, but has been previously listed in some sources as Red Balls. Bleasdale's sketch was never previously named but was sometimes referred to as Go Out Dancing.

== Production ==
The show was made by London Weekend Television for ITV and recorded at South Bank Television Centre. It was produced by Nicholas Barrett and directed by Alasdair Macmillan.

The show was nominated for the Best Light Entertainment (Programme or Series) award at the 1992 BAFTAs.

== Home media ==
The show was released on VHS and later on Region 2 DVD. The DVD was also included in a set of Victoria Wood's work for ITV.
