= The Boar (newspaper) =

University of Warwick student newspaper

- Type: Newspaper with online counterpart
- Format: Broadsheet
- Editor-in-chief: Lucy Gibbons and Rachel Gore
- Founded: October 1973
- Language: English
- Headquarters: University of Warwick Students' Union HQ, Coventry, England
- Circulation: 6,000
- Website: theboar.org

The Boar is the student newspaper of the University of Warwick. Founded in 1973, the paper is published thrice a term, and the website is continually updated. Whilst it is affiliated to the university's Students' Union, the paper is editorially independent. It consists of 16 sections, including News, Sports, and Podcasts.

Contribution to The Boar is entirely voluntary, and none of the approximately 80 editorial staff are paid. Furthermore, the paper does not receive any budget from the Students' Union and therefore relies entirely on self-generated advertising revenue to keep afloat.

In 2013, The Boar was selected as Student Publication of the Year. In 2018, the Boar won the Student Publication of the Year award at BBC Radio 4 Journalism Awards.

== History ==
Upon its founding in October 1973, the Boar incorporated Campus, the student newspaper of the late 1960s and early 1970s. For a brief period in 1988, The Boar changed its name to Mercury, though by the end of the academic year it reverted to The Boar. With the exception of the occasional comedy issue of the Warwick Goat, The Boar has consistently remained as the Boar or the Warwick Boar.

The Boar has been a free newspaper since 1990. In 2004, the online edition was relaunched with a feature to accept reader comments. This work was undertaken by Electronic Engineering student Chris Williams, with the help of online editor Kate Fleetwood and others.

The paper was published weekly until 2009 when it switched to fortnightly print editions following financial troubles.

The website was again relaunched in April 2013. It was redesigned but also provided a new back-end for the team after encountering problems with the old site.

== Awards ==
=== 1990s ===
In 1990, the paper won the Impact Award for most improved publication at the Guardian Student Media Awards. In both 1994 and 1998 it was nominated for Newspaper of the Year.

In 1999, it was nominated for Student Website of the Year at the Guardian Student Media Awards and Jonathan Stubbs won Best Arts Journalist at The Independent / NUS National Student Journalism Awards.

=== 2000s ===
In 2000, Andrew Losowsky was runner-up Best Student Feature Writer in the National Student Journalism Awards. Tim Clist was nominated for Best Feature Writer and Andrew Losowsky for Best Arts Journalist.

In 2001, the paper was nominated for Design of the Year in the Guardian Student Media Awards, Mark Douglas was nominated for Sports Writer of the Year and the compulsory laptops campaign was nominated for Student Campaign of the Year.

In 2002, Oliver Scarff won Best Photographer in the NUS awards, and Nicholas Morrison was nominated for Sports Writer of the Year in the Guardian awards.

In 2003, the paper was runner up Student Newspaper of the Year in the Guardian awards. The judges (including Alan Rusbridger and Jon Snow) commented: "A consistently high standard, like a fine regional newspaper with an outstanding magazine. The dedication of the staff to produce this newspaper on a weekly basis is incredible." Mark Douglas was also nominated for Sports Writer of the Year. In the NUS awards, the paper received a nomination for Best Campaign and Rhian Nicholson was nominated for Best Travel Journalist

In 2004, it won Best Website and Jake Morris won Best Reporter in the NUS awards. Tom Thurnell-Read was nominated for Travel Writer of the Year in the Guardian awards.

In 2005, it was runner-up for Best Website in both the Guardian and NUS awards. In the NUS awards, Matt Sandy was runner-up Best Reporter and was nominated for Best Investigative Journalism.

In 2006, The Boar received 17 nominations in the Guardian and NUS awards (a record in the history of student media, according to the newspaper). These included Best Newspaper in the NUS awards and Best Website in both. In the NUS awards it won Best Reporter (Matt Sandy), Best Feature Writer (Alastair Plumb), Best Sports Writer (David O'Kelly) and Best Photographer (Ching Sum Yuen). In the Guardian awards, it won Website of the Year, Travel Writer of the Year (Tanc Newbury) and Sports Writer of the Year (David O'Kelly).

Leo Robson was nominated for Best Critic at the Guardian awards every year from 2006 to 2009. He won it in 2008.

In 2009, Sam Hancock was nominated for Best Travel Writer.

=== 2010s ===
The Boar was shortlisted for the Digital Innovation Award at the 2010 Midlands Media Awards.

On 1 September 2013, The Boar was announced as Ones to Watch's Student Publication of the Year after being selected as Student Publication of the Month for February. The Boar received the most votes in the public voting round, but it also really impressed the judges. Judge Lucy Sherriff, of Huffington Post Students, said: "The Boar stood out as a winner for the amount of thought and effort put into producing exclusive content – including FOIs – as well as breaking news. Its content is intuitive and is really tailored towards a student audience." The Boar's new website design was also complimented for having an "innovative website design with a rotating splash".

In 2016, The Boar was awarded Best Design at the Student Publication Association (SPA) 2016 National Conference. The Boar also took home three further awards including Best Comment Writer for Mike Wrench, a Highly Commended award for Best Entertainment Piece and a Special Mention Award for Best Interview Piece by Jesse Samasuwo.

In 2017, The Boar took home two awards at the SPA 2017 National Conference. These included Highly Commended awards for Best Sports Coverage by James Roberts and Best Entertainment Piece by Cameron Clark. In November of the same year, The Boar was awarded Best Publication in the Midlands at the SPA's inaugural Regional Awards.

In 2018, The Boar won Student Publication of the Year award at the inaugural BBC Radio 4 Journalism Awards. They won this award for the second year in a row in November 2019.

=== 2020s ===
In 2020, The Boar took home two awards at the SPA 2020 National Conference. These included Highly Commended awards for Digital Media and Best Lifestyle Piece by Liam Gould.

2024 saw the paper win another set of awards at the SPA 2024 National Conference. Writer Zoé Barret took home the award for Best Creative Piece, while Best Interview was won by The Boar's Eden Fall-Bailey. Luke Chapman and Archie Clarke were further Highly Commended in the category of Best News Story.

In 2025, The Boar reached new heights, picking up five awards at the Student Publication Association (SPA) regional awards, including Anna Bickerton for Best Journalist, and Editor-in-Chief Luke Chapman for Outstanding Commitment. The paper also won the accolade for Best Publication. The paper was later shortlisted for twelve awards at the SPA nationals. At the SPA 2025 National Conference, The Boar won Best Design (Newspaper) and was highly commended for Best Publication. Luke Chapman, Editor-in-Chief, was highly commended for Best Reporter and the Billy Dowling-Reid Award for Outstanding Commitment.

== Origin of name ==
Founding Editor Godfrey Rust provides this explanation:

We wanted something that would convey a sense of instant history to cover up the (then) appalling newness of the place (and encourage more Americans to invest). Sitting in the Pennyfarthing Bar, [Co-founder] Kasper de Graaf and I pooled our vast knowledge of local heraldry. Coventry, we thought, had an elephant as its symbol, and Warwick had a bear. Or perhaps it was the other way around.

Anyway, neither of these had the required cachet. After experiments with other possible fauna we stumbled on the idea of a boar. Exactly whose the idea was I no longer remember, but I am certain that draught bitter was only 13p a pint. The pun was dreadful, but it was my round and there seemed to be no-one to stop us.
