= Jack Rankin =

British politician (born 1992)

Jack Rankin MP
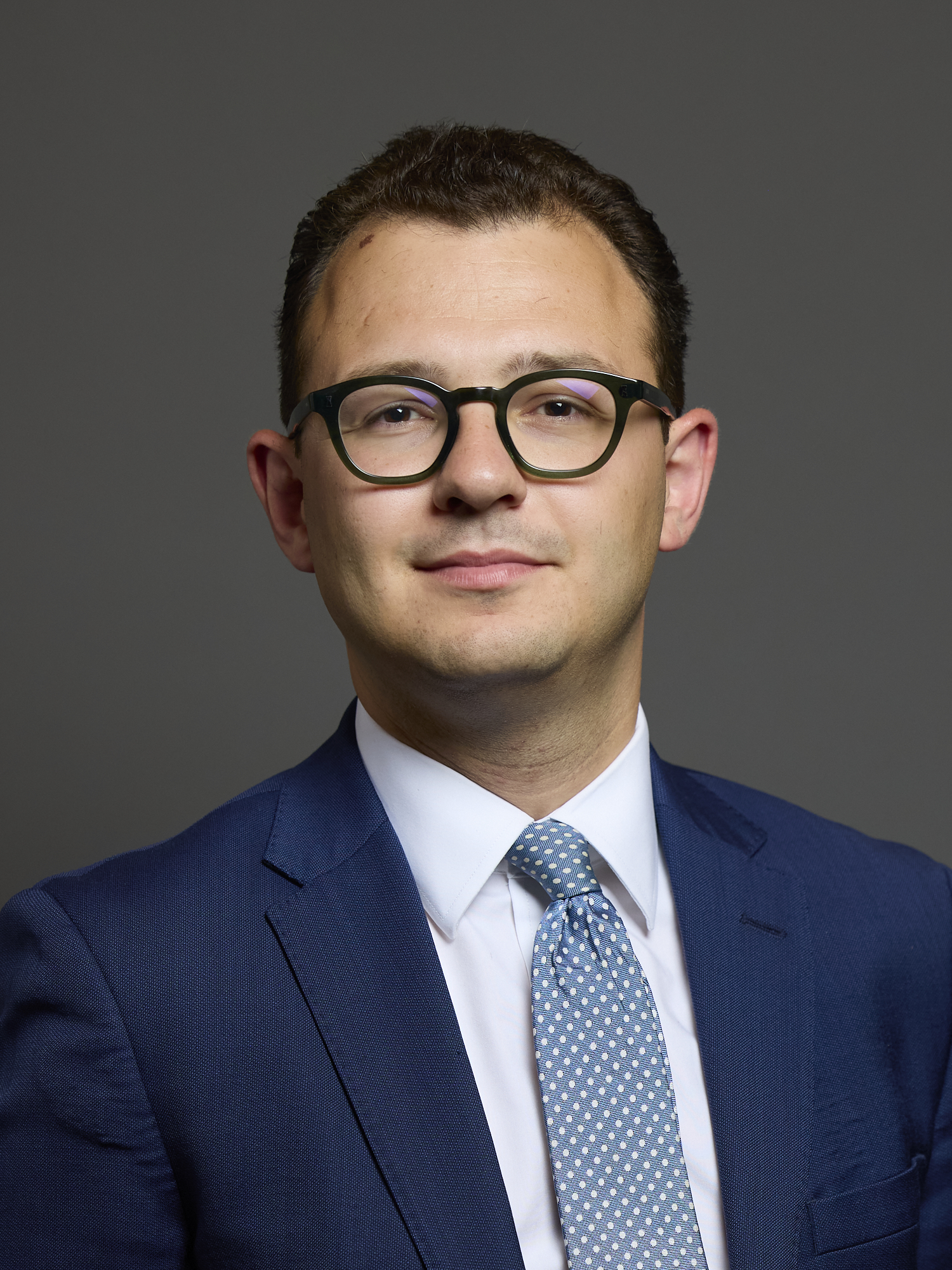
- Official portrait, 2024

Parliamentary Private Secretary to the Leader of the Opposition
- Incumbent
- Assumed office 2 September 2026 Serving with John Glen
- Leader: Kemi Badenoch

Member of Parliament for Windsor
- Incumbent
- Assumed office 4 July 2024
- Preceded by: Adam Afriyie
- Majority: 6,457 (14.3%)

Personal details
- Born: Jack Michael Rankin; 19 August 1992 (age 34) Ashton-under-Lyne, England
- Party: Conservative
- Spouse: Sarah New (m. 2016)
- Children: 2
- Education: University of Warwick (MMath)
- Website: Official website

Jack Michael Rankin (born 19 August 1992) is a British politician who has been the Member of Parliament (MP) for Windsor since 2024 and Parliamentary Private Secretary to Kemi Badenoch, leader of the Conservative Party, since September 2026. A member of the Conservative Party, he worked as an energy markets professional before being elected to Parliament, having a career background in commodity trading and corporate finance. He was a councillor for Windsor and Maidenhead Borough Council between 2015 and 2019.

== Early life and non-political career ==
Rankin was born in Ashton-under-Lyne in 1992. He describes his background as "aspirational working-class... with self-made businesspeople parents" and was educated at West Hill School, a state comprehensive in Stalybridge, followed by the University of Warwick, where he read Mathematics and Physics, graduating with an undergraduate master's degree (MMathPhys) in 2014. Whilst at Warwick, he was elected Chairman of the University of Warwick Conservative Association.

In 2014, Rankin began working for Centrica, at their head office in Windsor, Berkshire. His work related to long-term commodity trading and mergers and acquisitions in the energy industry.

Immediately prior to being elected to Parliament in 2024, Rankin led Pexapark's renewable advisory business in the UK and Ireland.

== Parliamentary career ==
At the 2017 general election, Rankin contested Ashton-under-Lyne, coming second with 32.0% of the vote behind the incumbent Labour MP Angela Rayner.

In September 2018, he was selected for the marginal seat of Warwick and Leamington in the first tranche of candidates ahead of what became the 2019 general election. He came second, losing by 789 votes.

Rankin was selected as the candidate for Windsor in September 2023, in what was described as a "gruelling process". During the election campaign, Rankin began a petition to save the Windsor & Royal Borough Museum and tourist information centre from closure, gaining over 1,700 signatures.

=== Member of Parliament for Windsor (2024-) ===
==== July - December 2024 ====
Rankin was subsequently elected as the Member of Parliament for Windsor at the 2024 general election, winning 36.4% of the vote and a majority of 6,457.

Rankin gave his maiden speech on 22 October 2024, during a debate in the Commons on the Commonwealth of Nations. He referenced a number of constituency issues, including a third runway at Heathrow and flooding, as well as sharing the history of his Windsor constituency through a constitutional focus, touching on Windsor Castle, Magna Carta and the Commonwealth. He said he would fight for the principles: "a belief in the rule of law, parliamentary democracy, freedom of speech, property rights, and innocent until proven guilty by a jury of our peers, all built on a shared constitutional heritage" in his time in Parliament.

Later in October 2024, Rankin raised the employment and "millions" generated for the local economy by Ascot and Royal Windsor racecourses within his constituency, and the impact of proposed regulation. Following this, in February 2025, two local news stories appeared in quick succession regarding Rankin's contribution and his Members' Register of Interests. The stories featured no opposing quotes and Rankin was thanked by both constituency racecourses for visiting them, and standing up for their employees during an uncertain period for the industry. In the Bracknell News, Rankin was quoted as saying "I proudly and unashamedly continue to stand up for the fantastic Ascot and Royal Windsor racecourses in my constituency, that is me doing my job, regardless of any attempt to skew my clear motives for doing so".

Reacting to the 2024 budget, Rankin attacked Chancellor Rachel Reeves for "chucking money at an unreformed public sector while ballooning public sector pay", and the Cabinet for their "distinct lack of real world, private sector experience."

In October 2024, it was confirmed with 24-hours' notice that The Manor Hotel in the village of Datchet within Rankin's constituency would be used as accommodation due to the "high number of arrivals across the channel". Rankin wrote to the Home Secretary, Yvette Cooper, to oppose this decision, following up with two oral questions in the House of Commons chamber. In January 2025, he hosted a Westminster Hall debate on asylum hotels, stating that "we, collectively, are the fools for putting a pot of gold at the end of the rainbow—we need to remove it." The hotel was closed in May 2025, with a report by The Times stating that "[Rankin] is one of a few MPs who has managed to persuade the Home Office to close an asylum hotel under this government."

In November 2024, Rankin started a petition against potential closure of the Windsor post office.

==== 2025 ====
Rankin was placed on the public bill committee for the Tobacco and Vapes Bill in January 2025. Sharing his views on the Bill in The Spectator, Rankin said his party should be "remembering that the Conservative Party has traditionally stood for individual liberty, personal responsibility and the free market" saying that the Bill "flies in the face of all these principles".

After the Royal Borough of Windsor and Maidenhead Council announced its budgetary plans to increase Council tax by 25%, Rankin began a campaign, calling on the government to reject the rise. Following local campaigning by Conservative Councillors and the TaxPayers' Alliance, the government announced it would only allow the council to raise Council tax by 8.99%.

Speaking at a Westminster Hall debate in January 2025, Rankin raised concerns at the government's changes to employer National Insurance contributions, specifically regarding Thames Hospice and Thames Valley Air Ambulance which provide services within his constituency.

Speaking at Home Office oral question time, Rankin highlighted the "ticking time bomb" posed by Indefinite Leave to Remain in the UK, which he said could cost the British state "more than £61 billion."

Rankin has campaigned for the re-instatement of Channel 1 of the River Thames Scheme, raising this with the Prime Minister at Prime Minister's Questions. He subsequently secured a meeting with the Minister for Water and Flooding.

In April 2025, Rankin sponsored an early day motion advocating for the mass deportation of illegal migrants within the UK, along with seventeen other MPs.

On 22 April 2025, Rankin made his debut at the despatch box, carrying out official opposition duties at justice oral questions.

Following his petition to Save Windsor Post Office, which gained over 1,850 supporters, Rankin presented the signatures formally to the House of Commons.

When the House of Lords (Hereditary Peers) Bill came to the Commons, Rankin delivered a speech in opposition to the government's reforms:

"We walk through the Division lobbies, directed by the Whips, often having had no time, because of the impossible juggling act, to develop real knowledge of the topic in question or to think through properly the implications. Some of the stuff that leaves this place with a massive majority might have well been written in crayon. Thank God for the other place. Do not remove long-serving public servants and outstanding legislators. Do not pick at the threads of our constitution. The other place is one of the parts of our constitution which works best. We should retain Lords amendment 1 and 8."

Reacting to Heathrow's expansion plan coming forward in August 2025, Rankin said: "Heathrow's expansion cannot be judged on aviation capacity alone. It must be scrutinised for its real economic value, its environmental costs, and its impact on the day-to-day lives of my constituents. On all these fronts, I will continue to stand firmly against the third runway."

In September 2025, at Prime Minister's Questions, Rankin raised the armed arrest of comedy writer Graham Linehan at Heathrow Airport and asked the Prime Minister to commit to reviewing the United Kingdom's free speech laws.

Writing in The Telegraph, in October 2025, Rankin warned that the government's "anti-enterprise" agenda and "surrender" to Chinese grip on critical minerals risked national security.

== Political views ==
Rankin is a self-professed small-c conservative and supporter of "authentic conservative principles". In an interview with The House magazine, he called for a restoration of the British constitution, which would be done through "some kind of 'Great Repeal Act', where we get rid of all the things I’ve just talked about: the Human Rights Act, the Equality Act and the Climate Change Act."

He further claimed that "I want to be part of a new generation of Conservatives that gets us into an authentically Conservative place which can effect regime change at British state level, to deliver the scale of change that this country desperately needs. If we can’t do that, Britain faces a challenge of civilisational proportions."

In an interview with Outpost Media, he argued that the Conservative Party lost the 2024 General Election for two main reasons: that the party spent 47% of GDP and oversaw net migration of a million a year (while conceding COVID and the Russo-Ukrainian War as mitigating context), and that it had operated within what he calls the "Blairite constitutional architecture" (the Human Rights Act 1998, Equalities Act 2010, Supreme Court, European Convention on Human Rights) which he says makes conservative delivery structurally impossible regardless of who is in office.

Rankin is a defender of Israel believing the International Criminal Court case against the country was 'preposterous'. He has stated that anti-Zionism is 'nothing less than anti-Jewish racism'.

Rankin is an opponent of the Terminally Ill Adults (End of Life) Bill and argued in May 2026 that "proponents of the assisted suicide Bill may be well-intentioned, but even the best intentions can lead to ruinous outcomes. This Bill should be left in the previous session, where it belongs."

In September 2023, Rankin was accused by the charity Trans Safety Network of sharing transphobic social media posts after describing LGBTQ rights charity Stonewall as "dangerous" and criticised public and corporate funding of the organisation. Rankin defended his comments saying he opposes discrimination against LGBTQ people, but that "a number of organisations have been pushing a politically contentious agenda in schools, an agenda that tells children they may have been 'born in the wrong body' and promotes the permanent and irreversible medical and surgical treatments to children."

In April 2024, he described the UK as in a "pre-war environment" and called for the UK to re-arm.

He is a proponent of CANZUK, arguing that it would be beneficial for Britain's economy, diplomacy and defense.

== Personal life ==
In 2016, Rankin married non-practising barrister Sarah New. He lives in Sunninghill with his wife and two sons.

== Electoral history ==
General election 2024: Windsor
Party	Candidate	Votes	%	±%
Conservative	Jack Rankin	16,483	36.4	−19.6
Labour	Pavitar Mann	10,026	22.2	+2.6
Liberal Democrats	Julian Tisi	9,539	21.1	+2.2
Reform	Harl Grewal	4,660	10.3	+10.0
Green	Michael Boyle	2,288	5.1	+1.6
Independent	David Buckley	1,629	3.6	+2.6
Workers Party	Simran Dhillon	621	1.4	N/A
Majority		6,457	14.3	−22.2
Turnout		45,419	61.9	−5.4
Registered electors		73,334		
Conservative hold		Swing	−11.1	

Parliament of the United Kingdom
Preceded by Adam Afriyie	Member of Parliament for Windsor; 2024–present	Incumbent
