= University of Warwick Conservative Association =

University political society

- Abbreviation: UWCA
- Formation: 1965
- Type: University political society
- Location: University of Warwick
- Website: Official website

The University of Warwick Conservative Association is a student conservative association founded in 1965 at the University of Warwick. It is affiliated with Warwick Students' Union.

== History ==
As one of the associations most famous alumni, David Davis was the honorary chairman of the association. However, it was accidentally revealed on BBC Radio 5 Live by the then-internal affairs secretary that due to his uncooperative nature with the association, Davis was to be removed from his position. It was recognised that since David was Brexit Secretary at the time, he did have other priorities, but it was felt that this did not excuse the lack of communication on Davis part. In response, the association formally announced that it was considering changing who held the role.

In May 2022, the association invited the then-Education Secretary Nadhim Zahawi to address them. This invitation proved to be controversial as other students had taken offence to earlier comments by Zahawi that were seen as transphobic. Protesters initially attempted to deplatform Zahawi and prevent the speech from happening, when these efforts failed protesters picketed the hall where the talk occurred. They rushed Zahawi after the talk, in the ensuing scuffle striking the events secretary. The campus safety team had to escort Zahawi to ensure no harm came to him.

In October 2022, concerns were raised by the Warwick Northern Society over an advertised 'Dress like a leftie' event. The association defended the event claiming that inspiration was taken from Warwick Labour Society, which had previously run "Dress like a Tory" social events.

In June 2024, concerns were raised when footage from their annual Chairman's Dinner in May was reported by The Sunday Times. Following the meal, it is reported that a member asked the DJ to play "Erika", which other guests can be seen dancing to in the footage. The association condemned the behaviour and apologised for any offence it had caused. The association defended its members' actions, claiming that they were not aware of the connotations of the song and that the member who requested the song would no longer be welcome to attend any of their events.

The university reported that the footage was "reprehensible", and it was reviewing it with the Jewish Society. The Union of Jewish Students called the clip "utterly abhorrent" and claimed it showed "blatant and unchallenged support for nazism [sic]". The association defended itself by highlighting that it acted quickly on the night, which the short clip released does not show, with a member of the executive committee rushing to the DJ to have him stop playing the song. The association also has said that the person seen actively singing along was not even a member of the association, but they would still be banned from attending events.

In response, the student union suspended the association pending an externally-led investigation. In September 2024, an investigation concluded that the association could have its society status restored. The association stressed that they were 'committed to combating all forms of antisemitism'.

== Notable alumni ==
- Sir David Davis, MP
- Tim Loughton, MP, UWCA Secretary
- Dame Andrea Leadsom, MP
- Jack Rankin, MP (current Honorary President and former Chairman)
