= RAW 1251AM =

Student radio station at the University of Warwick

RaW 1251AM
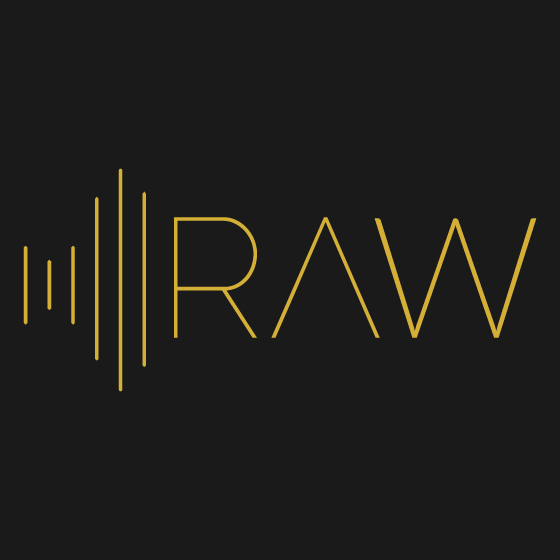
- England
- Broadcast area: University of Warwick
- Frequency: Online

Programming
- Format: Contemporary

Ownership
- Owner: Independent

History
- First air date: 1970

RaW is the student radio station at the University of Warwick and winner of the 2000 and 2003 BBC Radio 1 Student Radio Association Best Station awards.

Formerly known as W963, during the years when broadcasts were conducted via an induction loop around the university campus on 963 kHz AM, later broadcasting on 1251 kHz AM to the campus from 1999 to 2024. RaW now broadcasts from inside the Students' Union HQ building and streams all its output online.

== History ==
RaW began life as University Radio Warwick in the 1970-71 academic year by students who spent their summer vacation installing an induction loop transmission system in the Rootes residence buildings. (One of these students was David Davis, who would later go on to become a Conservative MP and serve as Secretary of State for Exiting the European Union.) The studios consisted of a wooden hut behind Rootes M (Meriden House) and broadcast at 312 metres (963 kHz). The station was soon rebranded to URW312.

In 1977, the station was moved into the newly constructed social building (which would eventually become the Students' Union Building).

On 30 January 1999, W963 rebranded itself as RaW 1251AM and on 30 September 1999, the station began broadcasting on 1251 kHz AM, discarding the then obsolete induction loop system.

RaW moved across the University of Warwick campus to University House in the Summer of 2008 as the Students' Union was refurbished. For the subsequent year RaW dropped its FM broadcast due to inability to use the FM antenna, resuming the annual broadcast for 2010.

In the Summer of 2010, RaW returned to the Students' Union, and is now based on the second floor of SUHQ (previously known as Union North).

In 2020, RaW celebrated its 50th anniversary with a pop-up radio station, Retro RaW. Retro RaW streamed for 50 hours and featured contributions from presenters past and present, as well as exclusive interviews with notable alumni such as Stephen Merchant and Timmy Mallett. In 2021, Retro RaW won the Student Radio Award for Best Event Programming.

On September 23, 2024, RaW 1251AM ceased broadcasting on 1251 kHz AM, rebranding to RaW.

== Activities ==
RaW provided a special broadcast service for the International Children's Games held in Coventry in July 2005, and was named the official broadcaster for this period.

In late 2005, David Davis, the Shadow Home Secretary, launched his bid for the Conservative Party leadership with a visit to RaW, the station which he helped to found. Following an interview in the studio (surrounded by around 20 journalists), Davis held a press conference in the Rootes Social Building Panorama Room, which symbolised the beginning of his campaign. His interview in the studio was later syndicated by BBC Radio 4 and the trip to the station reported on a number of media outlets.

2006 saw a large amount of work done to the station. Studio 1 saw the installation of a bespoke digital playout system ('Digiplay') as well as redecoration, and a new office was built in the foyer of the station allowing DJs to work undisturbed.

In 2011 four members of the station embarked on a charity fundraiser named "RaW on Tour". The tour consisted of a visit to 52 SRA affiliated student radio stations in England within one week. Over £1,000 was raised for Leukaemia and Lymphoma Research and the station was announced winner of the Charity Champion prize at the I Love Student Radio Awards later that year.

In May 2012 the station received recognition from notable industry website Media UK for an impressive set of audience figures which, in some areas of analysis, eclipsed a number of national radio stations, including BBC Radio 1, BBC Radio 2 and the Absolute Radio Network.

In 2013, RaW began its MaRaWthon Outside Broadcast that raised over £1500 for the charity Coventry Cyrenians by broadcasting for 100 hours, day and night, on the Piazza at Warwick University, as well as winning 4 Student Radio Awards for the previous years broadcasting in the categories Best Newcomer (Gold), Best Live Event (Gold), Best Speech (Silver), and Best Entertainment (Bronze).

In 2017, RaW launched a 50 Hour Broadcast in aid of Parkinson's UK. With the help of The Cheeky Girls & John Stapleton (patrons of the charity), as well as LBC's Steve Allen and Darren Adam, and BBC's Chris Stark they managed to raise just under £3,000 for the charity.

== Awards ==
RaW has twice been named the Student Radio Association's Station of the Year, in 2000 and 2003, along with other gold awards in both on and off air categories. At the 2020 Student Radio Awards, RAW were the first winners of a new category, The Diversity, Equality and Inclusion Award.

== Notable presenters ==
- John Bennett, sports reporter and presenter for BBC Sport
- Barry Myers aka DJ Scratchy Sound, key figure in punk, dub and ska since mid 1970s, supporting The Clash and early punk bands
- Rob Whitehouse, sports presenter, BBC Radio West Midlands and BBC Radio One producer
- Julian Druker, reporter and presenter for 5 News
- David Davis, politician and former Secretary of State for Exiting the European Union
- George Eaton, Political Editor for the New Statesman
- Leona Graham, Absolute Radio presenter and prominent voiceover artist
- Ruth Jones, actress, writer & comedian
- James King, BBC Radio 1's film reviewer
- Timmy Mallett, children's TV presenter in the 1980s and 1990s
- Simon Mayo, BBC Radio 2 & BBC Radio 5 Live presenter
- Stephen Merchant, Co-writer of The Office and Extras, in which he also co-starred
- Adam Mountford, Test Match Special (TMS) producer
- Dave Nellist, British politician, National Chair of TUSC and former Labour MP for Coventry South
- Ritula Shah, BBC radio presenter and journalist
- Quentin Rayner (Politics, c.1980-83) and Ian Woods (c.1981-84), former presenters in the 1990s of East Midlands Today
- Will Foster, producer of Radio 1 Breakfast with Greg James
- Russell Gowers, author of "Transforming Customer Engagement in Automotive" among other whitepapers
- Nicki Finlay, BBC radio producer and presenter, Channel One TV producer and breakfast show anchor, senior producer and presenter at Associated Press Television.
- Paul Sylvester, Content Director at Absolute Radio
- Sam Platt, FFC manager
- Adam English, presenter at Union Jack Radio Breakfast
- Phillip Stoneman, BBC Hereford & Worcester, BHBN Hospital Radio Sports presenter
- Greer Riddell, Digital Content Manager at Eagle Radio, founder of January Media Production
- Henry Riley, Presenter and Reporter at LBC
- Amanda Lewis, Editor at BBC Radio 4 News
- Phil Parry, Sports presenter, BBC Radio London
- Talia Kraines, Editorial Lead, Pop Music Spotify
- Tim Peach, Senior Producer, BBC Radio 5 Live
- Jeff Leach, Voice Actor and Comedian
- Adam Westbrook, Producer, The New York Times
- Chris Doidge, News Editor, BBC Radio Derby
- Jimmy Buckland, Director of Strategy, News UK
- Ali Plumb, Film Critic, BBC Radio 1
