= G.B.H. (TV series) =

1991 British television drama series

- Genre: Drama
- Created by: Alan Bleasdale
- Written by: Alan Bleasdale
- Directed by: Robert Young
- Starring: Robert Lindsay; Michael Palin; Lindsay Duncan; Julie Walters
- Composers: Elvis Costello; Richard Harvey
- Country of origin: United Kingdom
- Original language: English
- No. of seasons: 1
- No. of episodes: 7

Production
- Executive producer: Verity Lambert
- Producer: David W Jones
- Running time: 567 minutes

Original release
- Network: Channel 4
- Release: 6 June – 18 July 1991

G.B.H. is a seven-part British television drama written by Alan Bleasdale shown in the summer of 1991 on Channel 4. Described by Bleasdale as "one caring, liberal madman's odyssey through the appalling farce of life in Britain today", its protagonists are Michael Murray (played by Robert Lindsay), the hard-left Labour leader of a city council in the North of England, and Jim Nelson (played by Michael Palin), the headmaster of a special school. In normal parlance, the initials 'G.B.H.' refer to the criminal charge of grievous bodily harm (i.e. causing someone serious injury). However, Bleasdale claimed in an interview on the DVD that the title is supposed to stand for 'Great British Holiday'.

The series was controversial partly because Murray appeared to be based on Derek Hatton, former Deputy Leader of Liverpool City Council. After the first episode was aired, Channel 4 declined to provide preview tapes of the remaining instalments to Merseyside Police, who were concerned the programme could affect Hatton's court case regarding corruption. Bleasdale downplayed the connection, leading Hatton to comment, "the only person in the world who does not seem to think that Michael Murray is me, is Alan Bleasdale".

== Plot outline ==
The story is set in an unspecified city in the North of England, though it was shot in and around Manchester, during a period in which local left-wing councils are vying for increased autonomy from the Thatcher government. Michael Murray, an aggressive, womanising Labour councillor, returns to his old primary school and burns copies of school records which describe an event that almost caused him to be committed to a juvenile offenders' institution. He intimidates the elderly headmaster, Mr Weller, and dispatches him to a rural, lower-status special needs school run by the popular headteacher Jim Nelson. Murray meets with three members of the Militant Tendency—far-left politician Lou Barnes, academic Mervyn Sloane and 'fixer' Peter Grenville, who persuade him to call a general strike to protest against the government's policies.

Due to the incompetence of Murray's supporters, Nelson's school is not picketed and remains open, making it a focus for journalists, including tabloid writer 'Bubbles' McGuire, eager to discredit the strike. Murray tries to coerce Nelson, a moderate Labour member, into joining the strike. When this fails, criminal thugs hired by Grenville besiege the school and terrorise the children. Over the next few months, Nelson's school is picketed and his family are harassed at their home. Already a hypochondriac, Nelson develops a collection of neuroses under stress, including an inability to drive his car over bridges. However, his neighbours remain sympathetic and he is assured by a local farmer, Mr Burns, that the majority of traditional socialists in the area will defend him against the militants.

Conflicted between his ambition and his conscience, Murray encounters a wealthy woman named Barbara Douglas, who appears to admire him despite his crude manners. At the same time, he receives a taunting letter purporting to be from Eileen Critchley, the victim of his unspecified childhood crime, which drives him into hysterics. The letter has, in fact, been delivered secretly by Barbara. Murray's elder brother and chauffeur, Franky, grows tired of his arrogance and kicks him out of the car, leaving him stranded by the side of the road. Isolated and humiliated, Murray becomes more paranoid and unstable. He starts to develop a repertoire of involuntary tics and spasms which become increasingly difficult to conceal.

Barbara unsuccessfully tries to trick Weller into handing over his copies of Murray's school file. Weller suspects something is happening and delivers the file to Nelson for safekeeping. Meanwhile, Nelson's pacifist composure is beginning to crack: when menaced by a drunken skinhead, he suddenly chases the man down in his car before being stopped by his wife. When Murray visits Nelson's school again and attempts to wheedle him into compliance, Nelson punches him. Murray and Grenville then instigate a militant takeover of Nelson's local Labour branch, aiming to have him expelled from the party.

More letters from Eileen arrive. Unknown to Murray, they are part not only of a personal vendetta, but also of a conspiracy consisting of Barbara, Barnes and Grenville aimed at destabilising him. Hoping to provoke riots across the city, Barnes and Grenville arrange for a series of racist assaults on ethnic minorities. Meanwhile, Murray's suspicious wife searches for him in the hotel where he entertains his mistresses, reducing him to a nervous wreck. Needing more time to gather evidence against Murray, the conspirators order Barbara to calm him down by seducing him, which she does. Murray temporarily regains his sanity after his tryst and addresses community representatives over the riots. To the dismay of the plotters, he addresses the meeting with surprising skill and persuades the audience to refrain from vigilantism. Joining the plotters, Barbara admits that she enjoyed her liaison with him.

Nelson's family go on holiday and stay in a hotel run by Grosvenor, an impoverished aristocrat. On privately discovering Nelson's neuroses, he becomes sympathetic; the two men vent their frustrations over the collapse of English decency. Meanwhile, the plotters search the Nelsons' house for the file, only to discover that Nelson has taken it with him on holiday. In a meeting with McGuire, Barnes and Grenville reveal that they are in fact intelligence agents who have infiltrated Labour in order to root out the militants. Having discovered that the genuine hard-left had apparently withered, they have resorted to gaslighting Murray and staging the riots to discredit and destabilise the opposition. Grenville's brother (another of the conspirators) attempts to retrieve the file from the Nelsons' holiday home, but is discovered by Nelson, who suspects that he was sent by Murray and beats him with a tennis racket. Posing as CID police officers, the plotters then raid the holiday home and retrieve the file.

Returning home, Nelson appears at his local Labour branch, to defend himself against charges made by the conspirators of working against the party. Driven by guilt, Murray makes an oblique and faltering private attempt to reconcile himself with Nelson, but is furiously rebuffed. Grenville's thugs find themselves outnumbered by both the local members and the Labour-supporting farmers, who show up in support for Nelson; the motion for Nelson's expulsion is rejected. Meanwhile, an arrest warrant is issued against Murray for inciting the riots. Barbara is revealed to be the younger sister of Eileen, the girl who victimised Murray during their childhood. Having had a morbid fascination with death during her girlhood, Eileen once cajoled the young Murray into choking her—the secret that Murray has been trying to hide. Eileen eventually killed herself. After a lifetime of vengeful feelings towards Murray, Barbara finally accepts that he was a victim.

In recompense, Barbara helps Murray to secretly record a conversation in which the plotters admit their intention to provoke riots. She leaves him a recording of the confession, as well as revealing the information absolving him of any guilt about Eileen. Murray abandons his ambitions and resigns himself to his political fate, allowing Barbara to deliver him to the police. However, as she parts company with Barnes, Barbara reveals that his attempts to prevent the recording were unsuccessful. As Murray faces his fate, the Nelsons look to the future, still ignorant of much of what has happened beyond their own immediate lives. Nelson manages to drive his car across the bridge which had previously defeated him.

== Cast ==
- Robert Lindsay as Michael Murray
- Michael Palin as Jim Nelson
- Dearbhla Molloy as Laura Nelson
- Alan Igbon as Teddy
- Andrew Schofield as Peter
- Philip Whitchurch as Franky Murray
- Julie Walters as Mrs Murray
- Tom Georgeson as Lou Barnes
- Paul Daneman as Mervyn Sloane
- Peter-Hugo Daly as 'Bubbles' McGuire
- Jane Danson as Eileen Critchley (flashbacks, credited as 'Jane Dawson')
- Lindsay Duncan as Barbara Douglas
- Edward Mallon as Mark Nelson
- Hayley Fairclough as Jessica Nelson
- Anna Friel as Susan Nelson
- Amanda Mealing as Beth
- Michael Angelis as Martin Niarchos
- David Ross as Mr Weller
- Jimmy Mulville as Philip
- Bill Stewart as Geoff
- Gareth Tudor Price as Richard Grenville
- Ayesa Toure as Monica
- Julia St John as Diane Niarchos
- Colin Douglas as Frank Twist
- Clifford Rose as Judge Critchley
- Daniel Massey as Grosvenor
- Judith Barker as Margie
- Peter Armitage as Mr Burns
- Noreen Kershaw as Maureen Murray
- John Shrapnel as Dr Jacobs

== Production ==
External scenes of the primary school were shot at Lostock County Primary School in Bolton. Identifying signs were removed or in some cases painted out. One sign at the front of the school, that read 'Bolton MBC—Keep Off', had 'Bolton MBC' painted out. The sign—and the painted-out letters—were still visible in 2014.

== Awards and nominations ==
Award	Nominee(s)	Result
British Academy Television Award for Best Actor	Robert Lindsay	Won
British Academy Television Award for Best Actor	Michael Palin	Nominated
British Academy Television Award for Best Actress	Lindsay Duncan	Nominated
British Academy Television Award for Best Drama Serial	David Jones, Alan Bleasdale, Robert Young	Nominated
British Academy Television Craft Award for Best Original Television Music	Richard Harvey, Elvis Costello	Won
British Academy Television Craft Award for Best Make Up	Anne Spiers	Nominated
British Academy Television Craft Award for Best Film or Video Photography (Fiction)	Peter Jessop	Nominated
British Academy Television Craft Award for Best Graphics	Debby Mendoza	Nominated
British Academy Television Craft Award for Best Film or Video Editor (Fiction)	Anthony Ham, Oral Norrie Ottey	Nominated
Broadcasting Press Guild Award for Best Actor	Robert Lindsay	Won
Broadcasting Press Guild Award for Best Drama Series	David Jones, Alan Bleasdale, Robert Young	Won
RTS Television Award for Best Actor	Robert Lindsay	Won

== Home video ==
The series was released in the UK (Region 2 DVD) on 12 June 2006, it was also released in "The Alan Bleasdale Collection" box set with two Bleasdale drama series: Jake's Progress and Melissa. It was released in the US (Region 1 DVD) on 23 February 2010.

== See also ==
- G.B.H. (soundtrack)
- Julie Walters and Friends (ITV 28 December 1991)
