= Leona Graham =

British DJ (born 1971)

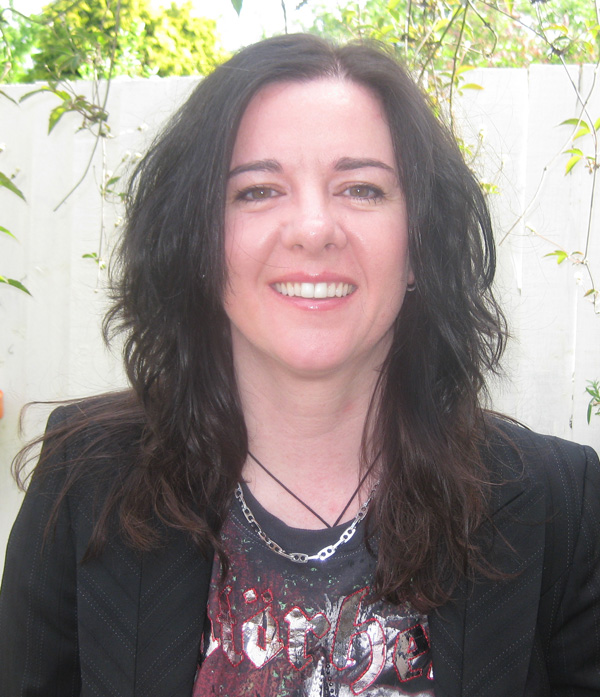
- Born: 18 January 1971 (age 54)
- Occupation: Radio presenter
- Career
- Show: Absolute Classic Rock Party
- Network: Absolute Radio
- Website: www.leonagraham.com

Leona Graham (born 18 January 1971) is a British radio broadcaster and voiceover artist. She is currently a presenter of Absolute Radio (formerly Virgin Radio), a position she has held since 2000. She can also be heard on the digital stations Absolute 80s and Absolute Classic Rock.

In addition, Graham has recorded voiceovers for numerous national and local TV and radio stations and commercials.

Graham was a judge at the Sony Radio Academy Awards 2011.

== Education ==
Graham was educated at Berkhamsted School for Girls in Berkhamsted, Hertfordshire. She then studied at the University of Warwick from 1989 to 1993 and received a Bachelor of Arts degree in drama. She is also a qualified school teacher.

== Radio broadcasting ==
=== Early career ===
She began her career in broadcasting at W963 University Radio Warwick (now Radio Warwick) where she presented the "Thursday Night Rock Show" and a nightly magazine style news programme called "Weekday Warwick".

Before joining Virgin Radio in 2000, Graham worked for a number of radio stations, at first for low pay and during the night.

From	To	Station/Employer	Slot/Function
01/1995	06/1995	Choice 102.2	Presenter 2 – 6 am
08/1995	08/1996	Power FM	Breakfast Show co-host Presenter of Early Breakfast 5 – 6 am
08/1996	03/1998	96.4 The Eagle	Presenter 2 – 6 pm weekdays
03/1998	11/1999	Surf 107.2	Breakfast Show DJ
11/1999	03/2000	Core DAB Radio	Presenter weekdays 2 – 7 pm

=== Virgin Radio ===
Graham joined Virgin as a presenter on 28 April 2000. During her time with Virgin Radio, she presented a variety of shows: Virgin Radio UK Album Charts, Virgin Radio Party, Teenage Kicks, 80's Anthems, Smells like the 90's, The Classic Rock Show, The Late Show, Virgin Love and Weekend Breakfast.

She was the second presenter heard on Virgin's digital station Virgin Classic Rock at its launch in 2003.

=== Absolute Radio ===
Graham stayed after Virgin Radio was re-branded as Absolute Radio. She works both as a main presenter and a fill-in presenter.

She can be heard every weekday from 10 am to 10 pm across three stations: main station (from 10am till 1 pm); then Absolute 80s (from 1pm till 4pm) and Classic Rock station (from 7pm till 10 pm). On Saturday, she works from midday to 6 pm, first with Classic Rock station (till 4 pm) and finally 80s station.

On 9 January 2012, Graham took over the weekday 1 pm – 5 pm slot for three months on Absolute Radio following the departure of Nick Jackson until Andy Bush arrived at the station.

Graham currently broadcasts on Absolute Radio from 10am-1pm, Monday to Friday.

=== Interviews ===
At Absolute Radio Graham has interviewed rock star Alice Cooper, AC/DC lead singer Brian Johnson and vocalist of Free, Bad Company and Queen, Paul Rodgers.

== Voiceovers ==
Graham has recently set up her own Voice over production Company called High Voltage Media.

Graham has been the voice for BBC Radio One, BBC 5 LIVE, 95.8 Capital FM, The BOX, E4, Virgin Radio and Absolute Radio. She also contributes regularly for BBC1, ITV1 and SKY1 and narrates programmes for Channel 4. She is also known for her voice in movie trailers on Virgin Media TV.

More recently she started working with Orion Media to produce trailers for its stations BRMB, Mercia and Wyvern FM and is one of the voices of Canadian radio station 102.3 Now Radio in Edmonton.

== Awards ==
In 2010 Absolute Radio received a Bronze Sony Radio Academy Award in the category Best Station Imaging for its imaging package in which Graham was one of the major contributors as Absolute Radio's station voice.
