= List of Victoria Wood: As Seen on TV episodes =

This is an episode listing for the BBC television show Victoria Wood: As Seen on TV, with the episodes' original airdates listed.

== Series overview ==
Series	Episodes	Originally released	
Series	Episodes	First released	Last released
1	6	11 January 1985	15 February 1985
2	6	10 November 1986	15 December 1986
Special		18 December 1987	

== Episodes ==
=== Series 1 (1985) ===
No. overall	No. in series	Title	Directed by	Written by	Original release date
1	1	"Show 1"	Marcus Mortimer	Victoria Wood	11 January 1985
Stand up: The Radio Station (Victoria Wood); Bunbury Homes (Duncan Preston); Family Planning (Victoria Wood, Julie Walters); Continuity announcer: Tastes to Come (Susie Blake); Tastes to Come (Duncan Preston, Celia Imrie); Song – "Seasons of Love" (Victoria Wood); Acorn Antiques – Episode 1; Video Box; Documentary: A Fairly Ordinary Man (Jim Broadbent, Victoria Wood, Christine Hargreaves); Margery and Joan (Julie Walters, Victoria Wood); Song – "Keep on Shopping" (Hope Jackman, Victoria Wood, Sue Jones-Davies, Meg Johnson); Continuity announcer: The weather and obesity (Susie Blake)
2	2	"Show 2"	Marcus Mortimer	Victoria Wood	18 January 1985
Stand up: A Strange Man with a Wardrobe (Victoria Wood); Advertisement: Cheap and Handy (Duncan Preston, Victoria Wood); Turkish Baths (Victoria Wood, Julie Walters); Playbox (Celia Imrie, Duncan Preston); Transmission breakdown; Song: "I'm Gonna Knock, Knock, Knock on Your Knocker"; Gail and Carl; Continuity announcer: Acorn Antiques (Susie Blake); Acorn Antiques – Episode 2; Kitty (Patricia Routledge); Song (duet): "Pissed Off With Love" (Victoria Wood, Denis Lawson); Documentary: "Swim The Channel" (Victoria Wood, Ron Pember, Maggie Ollerenshaw); Continuity announcer: Viewers in the North (Susie Blake); The reporter (Victoria Wood, Julie Walters)
3	3	"Show 3"	Marcus Mortimer	Victoria Wood	25 January 1985
Stand up: Swimming baths and the Doctors (Victoria Wood); Doorbells album (Duncan Preston); Shoe Shop (Victoria Wood, Julie Walters); Continuity announcer: Plays with dressing gowns (Susie Blake); Fitted Kitchen: Ill-Fitting Relationships; Service Wash (Victoria Wood); Anti-mugging spray (Celia Imrie, Duncan Preston); Song: "A Simple Northern Boy" (Victoria Wood); The Underwear Shop (Celia Imrie, Duncan Preston); Video Box; Acorn Antiques – Episode 3; Continuity announcer: Acorn Antiques Book (Susie Blake); The Piano Shop (Victoria Wood, Celia Imrie); Documentary: "To Be An Actress"; Pause For Thought; Continuity announcer: Forthcoming events (Susie Blake)
4	4	"Show 4"	Marcus Mortimer	Victoria Wood	1 February 1985
Stand Up: A Brick Through The Window (Victoria Wood); At The Doctor's: Cold Meat (Victoria Wood, Duncan Preston); Cosmetic surgery (Victoria Wood, Celia Imrie); Continuity announcer: Pippa (Susie Blake); Pippa; Gail and Carl: The Facts of Life; Song: "Go Away" (Victoria Wood); At The Doctor's: Running; Continuity announcer: Acorn Antiques (Susie Blake); Acorn Antiques – Episode 4; Kitty (Patricia Routledge); Continuity announcer: Tops and blouses (Susie Blake); Documentary: "On Campus"; At The Doctor's: Periods; The Self-Assertion Class
5	5	"Show 5"	Marcus Mortimer	Victoria Wood	8 February 1985
Stand up: Pam (Victoria Wood); Advertisement: "Happy With Your Wash?" (Celia Imrie); Supermarket Checkout (Victoria Wood, Celia Imrie); Continuity announcer: Strikes and Sunday viewing (Susie Blake); The Divorce (Maureen Lipman, Denis Lawson); Margery and Joan (Julie Walters, Victoria Wood); Continuity announcer: The weather (Susie Blake); Acorn Antiques – Episode 5; Giving Notes; Documentary: "Just An Ordinary School"; Announcement: The Last Show (Victoria Wood); Song: "Say Goodbye" (Victoria Wood, Julie Walters, Celia Imrie, Duncan Preston et al.); Continuity announcer: Darker nights (Susie Blake)
6	6	"Show 6"	Marcus Mortimer	Victoria Wood	15 February 1985
Stand up: Parties (Victoria Wood); The Library: Sex and Violence; The Health Food Restaurant (Victoria Wood, Julie Walters); Continuity announcer: Film classic; Film classic; Kitty (Patricia Routledge); The Library: Polycotton; Continuity announcer: Ministry of Warnings (Susie Blake); Acorn Antiques – Episode 6 Acorn Antiques; Continuity announcer: The Skip (Susie Blake); Gail and Carl: Washing-up Bowls; Dandruff Commercial; Whither the Arts (Duncan Preston); Documentary: "Bessie"; Postscript

=== Series 2 (1986) ===
No. overall	No. in series	Title	Directed by	Written by	Original release date
7	1	"Show 1"	Marcus Mortimer	Victoria Wood	10 November 1986
Stand Up: First Date (Victoria Wood); Advertisement: Bicycle Clips (Duncan Preston); Spaghetti; Continuity announcer: American Musical (Susie Blake); American Musical; Country Life; Continuity announcer: Soap operas (Susie Blake); Acorn Antiques – Episode 7; Documentary: "Mr Right" (Duncan Preston, Anne Reid); Song: "Let's Do It" (Victoria Wood); Continuity announcer: Unemployment (Susie Blake)
8	2	"Show 2"	Marcus Mortimer	Victoria Wood	17 November 1986
Stand up: Blood Donors & Shakespeare (Victoria Wood); Advertisement: Stealing detergent; Bingo (Victoria Wood, Julie Walters); Continuity announcer: Spanish opera (Susie Blake); Spanish opera; Kelly-Marie Turnstall (Victoria Wood, Mary Jo Randle); Acorn Antiques – Episode 8; Continuity announcer: Advertisement for Acorn Antiques Record; Acorn Antiques Costume Exhibition; Kitty (Patricia Routledge); Say Who You Are; Olde Tyme Music Hall; Continuity announcer: "Well Woman" (Susie Blake); Documentary: "Today in Hospital" (Duncan Preston); Fireside Tales: Megan's PMT
9	3	"Show 3"	Marcus Mortimer	Victoria Wood	24 November 1986
Stand up: Public Transport (Victoria Wood); The Doctor: Pregnancy; The Trolley; Continuity announcer: Frigidity (Susie Blake); The Second Mrs Constable; Margery and Joan (Victoria Wood, Julie Walters); Continuity announcer: Acorn Antiques (Susie Blake); Acorn Antiques – Episode 9; Song: "Don't Come Back" (Victoria Wood); Continuity announcer: Catherine Scott; Documentary: "Billy" (Hugh Lloyd, Duncan Preston, Victoria Wood); Fireside Tales: Morag; Continuity announcer: Closedown
10	4	"Show 4"	Marcus Mortimer	Victoria Wood	1 December 1986
Stand up: Acne & Schooldays (Victoria Wood); The Picnic on the Cliffs; Continuity announcer: With Signs for the Deaf (Susie Blake); No Gossip – Macbeth; Kitty (Patricia Routledge); Continuity announcer: Acorn Antiques; Acorn Antiques – Episode 10; Song: "I Saw You Today" (Victoria Wood); Kelly-Marie Turnstall (Victoria Wood, Mary Jo Randle); Medical School; Continuity announcer: The Wetherbys; Documentary: "A Very Funny Young Man Indeed"
11	5	"Show 5"	Marcus Mortimer	Victoria Wood	8 December 1986
Stand up: The Builders (Victoria Wood); Countrywide Local; Advertisement: Chocolates?; Jean and Barbara: Partly Political Broadcast (Victoria Wood, Julie Walters); Continuity announcer: Regional breakfast TV (Susie Blake); Margery and Joan (Julie Walters, Victoria Wood); Continuity announcer: Birthday Parade 1 (Susie Blake); Acorn Antiques – Episode 11; Song: "A Day at the Seaside" (Hope Jackman, Meg Johnson, Victoria Wood); Continuity announcer: Birthday Parade 2 (Susie Blake); The Garden Hose (Lill Roughley, Stephen Hancock); Documentary: "Flatmates"
12	6	"Show 6"	Marcus Mortimer	Victoria Wood	15 December 1986
Stand up: Old Moore's Almanac (Victoria Wood); Continuity announcer: Sports; Tattoo Parlour; Continuity announcer: Axing of Acorn Antiques Characters (Susie Blake, Duncan Preston, Julie Walters, Kenny Ireland); Acorn Antiques – Episode 12; Documentary: "Winnie's Lucky Day"; Song: "Count Your Blessings"; waitress (Julie Walters, Celia Imrie, Duncan Preston); Continuity announcer: Final Comment (Susie Blake)

=== Special (1987) ===
No.	Title	Directed by	Written by	Original release date
13	"Special"	Marcus Mortimer	Victoria Wood	18 December 1987
Continuity announcer: Forthcoming events (Susie Blake); Stand up: Soap operas (Victoria Wood); Advertisement: The Man's Bra (Duncan Preston); Self-Service (Victoria Wood, Julie Walters); Video Advertisement; Coronation Street (Victoria Wood, Julie Walters, Lill Roughley); Doctor Who (Jim Broadbent); Continuity announcer: Employment (Susie Blake); McConomy (Celia Imrie); Song: "High Risk Area" (Victoria Wood); Real Life (Julie Walters, Celia Imrie); A Woman in Specs (Victoria Wood); Continuity announcer: Sunday television (Susie Blake); Antiques Roadshow (Lill Roughley); The Anorak Song (Ian Wallace); The Mayflower Hotel, Nottingham (Victoria Wood, Julie Walters, Duncan Preston); Documentary: "The Making of Acorn Antiques" (Victoria Wood, Julie Walters, Celia Imrie, Duncan Preston, Kenny Ireland, Maggie Steed, Sam Kelly, Paul Heiney); Song: "At The Chippy" (Victoria Wood, Julie Walters, Lill Roughley, Meg Johnson); Continuity announcer/Andrew: Epilogue (Susie Blake)
