= Claire Horton =

British executive and charity worker (born 1962)

Claire Ellen Horton CBE (born 20 May 1962) is a British executive and charity worker. Since January 2021, she has been Director General of the Commonwealth War Graves Commission (CWGC), the body responsible for the care and upkeep of the graves and memorials of the 1.7 million men and women of the Commonwealth Forces who died in the first and second World Wars. CWGC operates in 23,000 locations across 153 countries. Previously she was the chief executive officer of Battersea Dogs & Cats Home (2010-2021), she was appointed into the role of Battersea Vice President in December 2020, chief executive of the University of Warwick Students' Union (2002–2008) and the chief executive of the Variety Club of Great Britain (2008–2010).

Horton sits as a non-executive director of The Animal Health and Welfare Board for England, the body responsible for strategic animal health and welfare policy, and oversight of implementation with England, taking account of public health considerations.

She is the former chairman of the Association of Dogs & Cats Homes (ADCH), the UK Rescue sector's umbrella and membership body (2015–2021)

She joined The National Archives Trust as Trustee in January 2022.

Horton has been a member of the University of Roehampton Development Board since 2020

In 2015 Horton was made an honorary Doctor of Laws (DLaws) by Roehampton University in recognition of her work nationally, to raise the standards of animal welfare and services to the community https://cqual.org/cq-en/news-13508-Battersea-chief-executive-receives-honorary-doctorate

In 2016, she was named Charity Chief Executive of the Year at the Third Sector Awards in recognition of her role in turning around Battersea from an operating deficit, increasing income, profiles, and volunteers as well as fostering careers.

In 2017 she was named UK Director of the Year, in the IoD Director of the Year awards. Horton took home the Public & Non Profit Director award, as well as winning the overall national, Director of the Year title.

Horton’s key area of work is creating and building partnerships and strategic alliances, business turnaround, income generation, organizational growth. She works across the UK and the Commonwealth with Governments, Ministers, Diplomats and multiple stakeholders from the public, private and third sectors on major change, sustainable development and innovation projects.

Horton was appointed Commander of the Order of the British Empire (CBE) in the 2020 New Year Honours for services to animal welfare. That same year, she was also appointed Director-General of the Commonwealth War Graves Commission.

Horton received an Honorary Silver Medal of Jan Masaryk from the Czech Republic Ambassador at the Czech Embassy in London in July 2021.
