= Battersea Dogs & Cats Home =

Animal rescue centre in London, England

Coordinates: 51.4785°N 0.1448°W

- Formation: 2 October 1860; 166 years ago
- Founder: Mary Tealby
- Type: Charity
- Location: Battersea, London, United Kingdom
- Services: Animal shelter
- Chief Executive: Peter Laurie
- Chair of Trustees: Paul Baldwin
- Revenue: £64.4 million (2023)
- Staff: 626 (2023)
- Volunteers: 628 (2023)
- Website: www.battersea.org.uk

Battersea Dogs & Cats Home (now known as Battersea) is an animal rescue centre for dogs and cats. Battersea rescues dogs and cats until their owner or a new one can be found. It is one of the UK's oldest and best known animal rescue centres. It was established in Holloway, London, in 1860 and moved to Battersea in 1871.

The non-government funded organisation cares for an average of 240 dogs and 145 cats across all three centres at any one time. The charity has cared for more than 3.1 million dogs and cats over its history.

== History ==
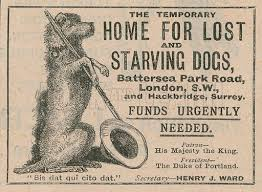
1901 advert for the home

Battersea was established in Holloway in 1860 by Mary Tealby (1801–1865). She called it "The Temporary Home for Lost and Starving Dogs". Initially the home was in her scullery but as the number of dogs delivered to her grew she hired some nearby stables funded by herself, her brother and Sarah Major. In 1860 the RSPCA agreed to assist and the committee meetings were held at the RSPCA offices at 12 Pall Mall. The Times ran a story ridiculing the idea of opening a "home" for dogs when there were homeless people in London. It accused Tealby of "letting her zeal ...outrun her discretion". Its most impressive supporter in the 1860s was Charles Dickens. He wrote about a "remarkable institution" that had saved "over a thousand" dogs in 1860. He noted that the dogs were cared for but if necessary humanely disposed of. By 1864 the finances were sound and they were handling 2,000 dogs that year.

Battersea started taking in cats from 1883, but its name remained Battersea Dogs Home until 2002.

During World War II, then manager Edward Healey-Tutt advised against people euthanising their pets because of fear of food shortages. Throughout the war Battersea fed and cared for over 145,000 dogs.

In 1979, Battersea acquired Bell Mead Kennels, which is now known as Battersea Old Windsor in Berkshire and in 1999, Battersea bought a centre in Kent, now known as Battersea Brands Hatch.

In 2002, the name was changed from Battersea Dogs Home to include cats in its name – Battersea Dogs & Cats Home.

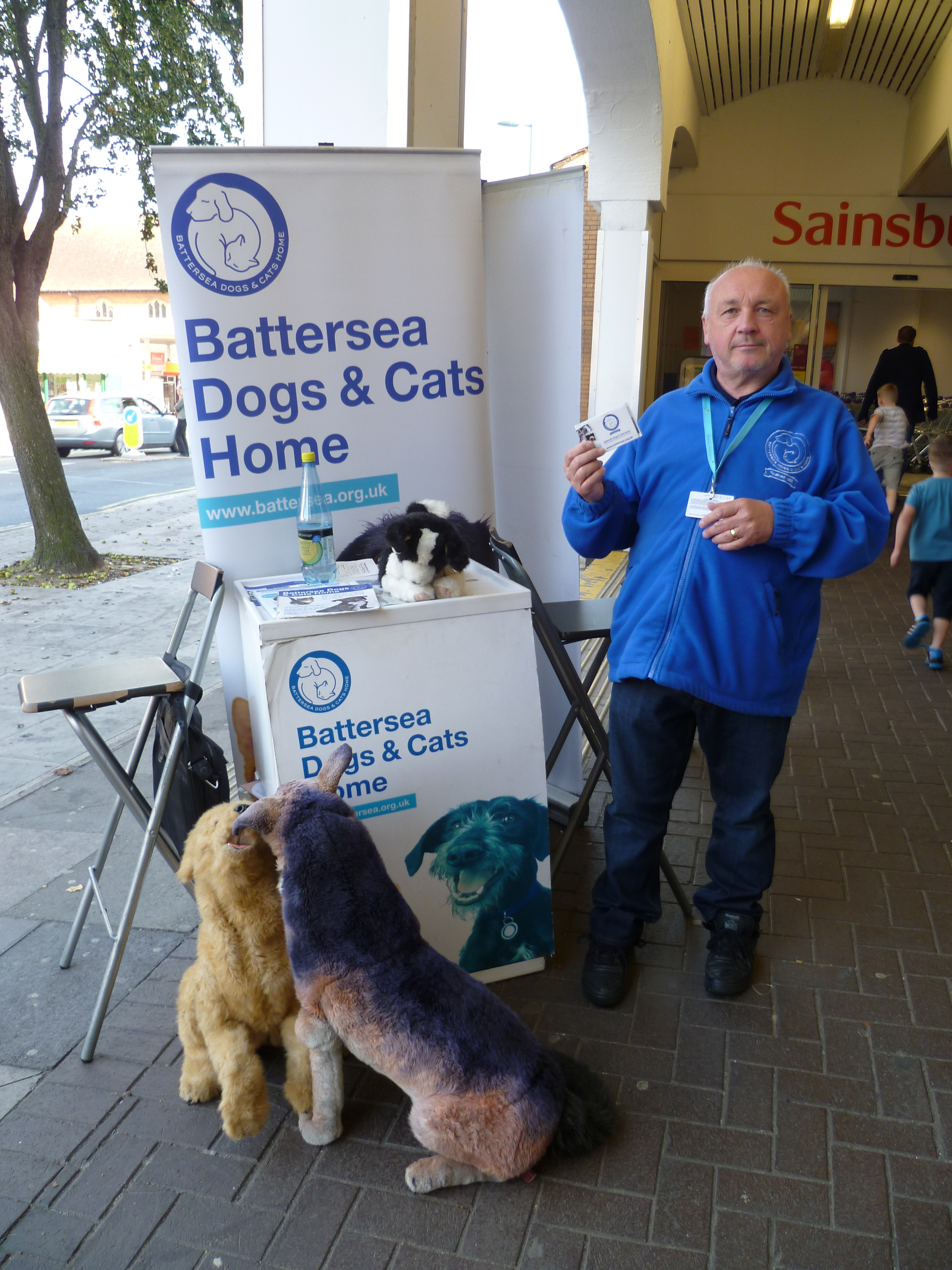
Collecting for the home in 2015

To mark its 150th anniversary in 2010, the charity's London Cattery was opened by HRH the Duchess of Cornwall. Royal Mail released a set of stamps featuring a series of dogs and cats that had been adopted by staff. It also launched a commemorative book, A Home of Their Own, which charts the history of the Home. This includes a look at prominent people who have adopted animals such as Elton John, who credited his dog Thomas with helping him through a rough period. Starting in 2011, Battersea implemented the "Staffies. They're Softer Than You Think" campaign to educate the public on the misconceptions about the Staffordshire Bull Terrier.

On 17 March 2015, Queen Elizabeth II unveiled a plaque to officially open the intake kennels named after their founder, Mary Tealby kennels. In 2016, a new state of the art Veterinary Hospital was opened at the London centre.

The charity's public affairs work involved spearheading a campaign to increase maximum sentences from six months to five years for the worst animal cruelty crimes in England and Wales. Battersea has been campaigning since 2017.

The charity also launched the Battersea Academy, and launched a campaign "Rescue Is My Favourite Breed" in 2019.

The Chief Executive is Peter Laurie, who took over from Claire Horton CBE January 2021.

=== Patronage ===
In 1885, Queen Victoria became patron of the home, and it has remained under royal patronage ever since. Queen Camilla is the current patron, and Prince Michael of Kent is the President.

== Media ==
In 1862, Charles Dickens published an article about the home for his magazine All the Year Round. He called it an "extraordinary monument of the remarkable affection with which the English people regard the race of dogs".

=== TV programmes ===
Battersea has featured on many television programmes and documentaries. The Channel 4 programme Pet Rescue which aired in 1997 featured Battersea Dogs & Cats Home. BBC One programme Animal Rescue Live was broadcast live for a week at Battersea in July 2007. The programme was presented by Matt Baker and Selina Scott.

ITV's For the Love of Dogs is filmed at Battersea. The show won multiple awards including four National Television Awards for 'Factual Entertainment' and was nominated for a BAFTA in 2013. Presented by Paul O'Grady from its inception in 2012 to his death in 2023, from 2024 it was helmed by Alison Hammond. In October 2023, Battersea announced that they would be naming a new veterinary hospital after O'Grady, and a "tribute fund" set up in his honour would go towards "life-saving and transformative medical procedures" for dogs and cats which need specialist care and treatment.

=== Ambassadors ===
- David Gandy (2012–2023)
- Paul O'Grady MBE (2012–2023)
- Dame Jacqueline Wilson (2013–)
- Amanda Holden (2013–)
- Anthony Head and Sarah Fisher (2018–2026)
- Tom Hardy CBE (2019–)
- Alison Hammond (2024–)

== Notable alumni ==
- Larry – Chief Mouser to the Cabinet Office (2011–)
- Palmerston – Chief Mouser of the Foreign & Commonwealth Office (2016–2020)
- Gladstone – Chief Mouser of HM Treasury (2016–2019)
- Beth – Dog of Queen Camilla

== Transport ==
Battersea Power Station tube station is located adjacent to the site on Battersea Park Road, and is served by the Northern line. Battersea Park station for National Rail and Queenstown Road station for National Rail services are located 3 minutes and 7 minutes walk away respectively.

== See also ==
- Animal welfare in the United Kingdom
