= Spencer Millman =

British television producer

- Occupations: Television producer and executive

Spencer Millman is a producer, known for producing Harry Hill's TV Burp, Man to Man with Dean Learner, Bo' Selecta, The Mighty Boosh and Lee Nelson's Well Good Show. In 2004, Millman was nominated for the BAFTA TV Award for Bo' Selecta, written by Leigh Francis. In 2008, Millman won a BAFTA for Harry Hill's TV Burp. The program went on to win an additional BAFTA and RTS Award in the same year.
