= University of Warwick Students' Union =

Students' union for the University of Warwick, in Coventry, England

Warwick Students' Union
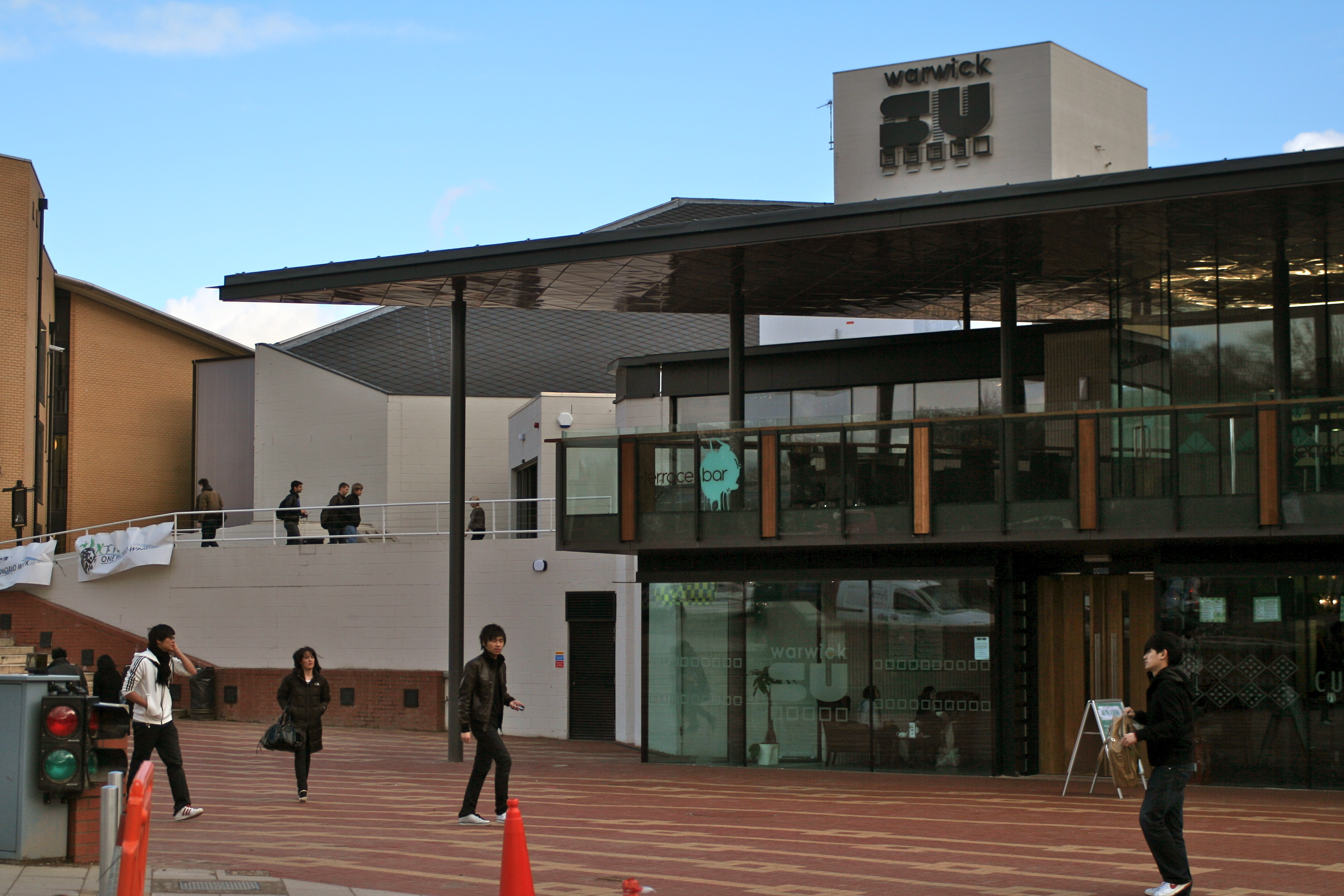
- Institution: University of Warwick
- Location: Gibbet Hill Road, Coventry, England
- Established: 1965
- President: Alijah Taha
- Sabbatical officers: Ananya Sreekumar (Vice President for Education) James Varney (Vice President for Democracy and Development); Maanya Raju (Vice President for Postgraduate Students); Ollie Chapman (Vice President for Welfare and Campaigns); Adam Skrzymowski (Vice President for Societies) Louis Gosling (Vice President for Sports)
- Members: c. 30,000
- Affiliations: National Union of Students, British Universities & Colleges Sport AdviceUK, CPAG, National Council for Voluntary Organisations, UK Council for International Student Affairs, Coventry and Warwick Chamber of Commerce
- Website: www.warwicksu.com

Warwick Students' Union, also known as Warwick SU, is the students' union for the University of Warwick, in Coventry, England.

== History ==
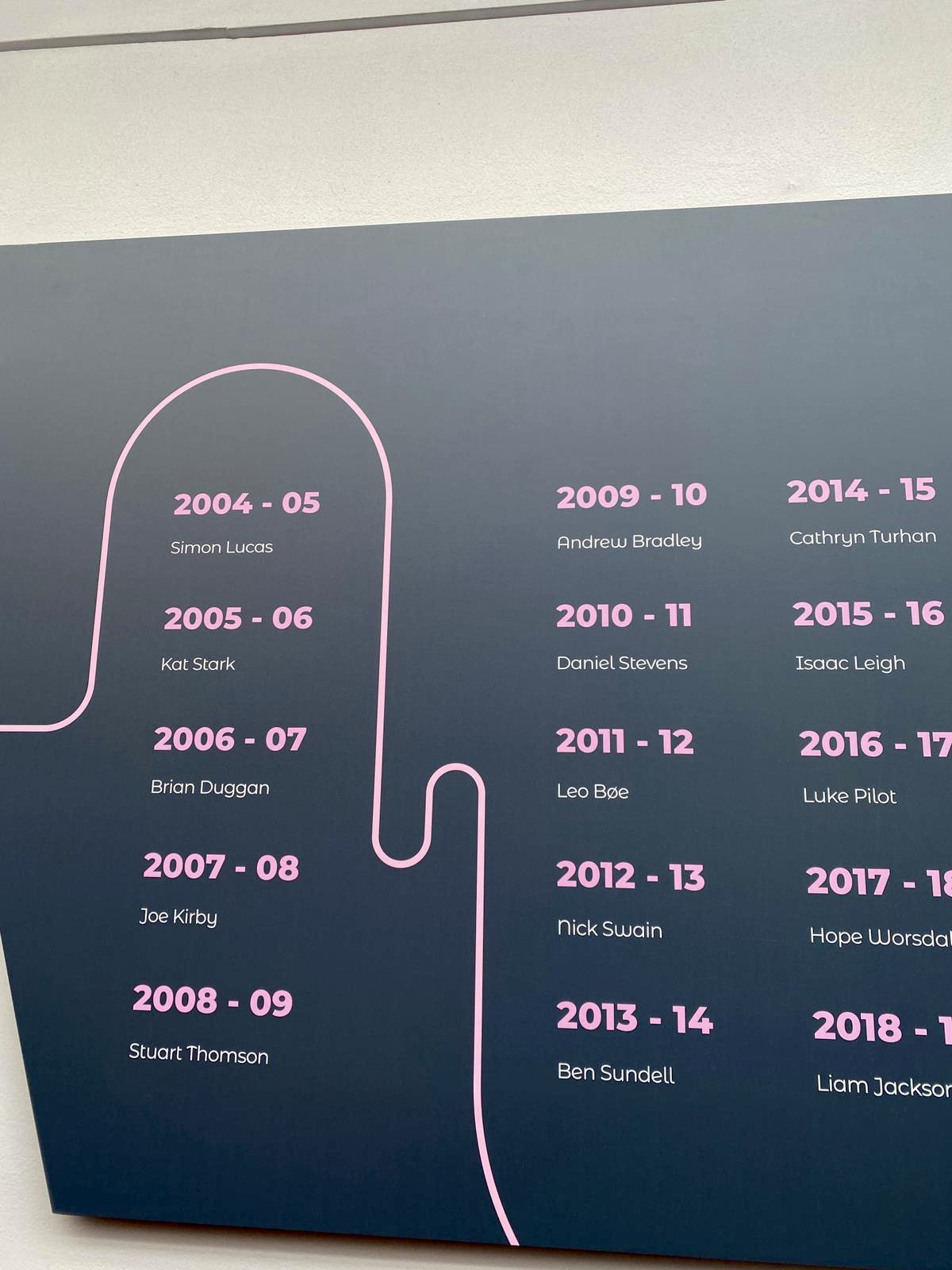
Presidents of the University of Warwick Students’ Union

The Students' Union developed in tandem with the university and has existed since 1965. Its early years were characterised by heavy protests; the period of 1967-1975 has been described as "[t]he high noon of rabid Warwick militancy". Early protest was largely inspired by controversy regarding the construction of an SU building; this would develop into a series of protests later labelled 'The Warwick Spring'.

The Warwick Spring

The University of Warwick chair was initially opposed to formally recognising the SU on its campus. The founding Vice-Chancellor of the University, Lord Jack Butterworth, stated at one point in 1970/1 that "the Students' Union will never have its own building."

One of the earliest Warwick student protests began on 3 February 1970, when approximately 200 students held a 24 hour sit-in at the Registry of the University as a result of the University's failure to come to a decision on whether to construct a Students' Union building. This was shortly followed by a second occupation after the university moved to discipline student leaders involved in the protest. During this second protest, student protestors found confidential files in an unlocked cabinet; the documents allegedly included evidence that Warwick had used a private detective to monitor a visiting U.S. academic, David Montgomery, and evidence that staff maintained close ties with local industrialists. Selected documents were removed from the registry of the university, and shared with members of the Student Union and to then-reader of Labour History at Warwick, E. P. Thompson. A mass meeting of staff and students discussed calling for a public inquiry and agreed to end the sit-in the next day. That night, university representatives served students with a court injunction requiring them to leave, return the files and copies, and refrain from publishing their contents. The injunction began on 12 Feburary, and was dissolved on 26 Febuary following internal pressure.

In March 1970 Thompson would edit an publish various student's accounts of the files scandal in his book Warwick University Ltd: Industry, Management and the Universities. Recruitment to the University of Warwick following the files scandal dropped by 25%. It was estimated that it took a decade for the University of Warwick to instituionally recover. In 1975 an SU building was erected on campus.

=== Recent history ===
The SU's continual involvment in protests, rent strikes, and occupation would subsequenly lend the university its nickname 'Red Warwick'. In 1974, one Warwick student Kevin Gately was killed during the Red Lion Square disorders. In 2009, many Students' Union officers were active in the occupation of a lecture theatre in the Social Studies building to express solidarity with Gaza.

==== Warwick Occupy ====
On Tuesday 19 November 2019, a collective of students known as Warwick Occupy led an occupation of three rooms in Warwick SUHQ for 30 days to protest allegations of institutional racism within Warwick SU. The collective were made up of several liberation groups and societies on campus including Warwick Anti-Racism Society, Warwick Anti-Sexism society, Warwick Pride and Warwick Labour.

The initial protests that sparked the occupation began when retired Israeli Defense Force Colonel Eyal Dror was invited by the Warwick Jewish Israeli Society and Stand With Us UK to speak on campus. The event took place on 19 November. A statement with more than 250 signatures had called for the cancellation of the event. During the colonel's talk, protestors linked arms and the protest eventually culminated in the occupation of three rooms in the SU headquarters.

==== Free education ====
In the Autumn of 2011, Warwick Students' Union passed policy against tuition fees which stated its position in defence of free education.

In October 2014, a campaign group emerged, called Warwick for Free Education. The group rose to prominence after a sit-in at the university's Senate House was broken up by the police, who had been called in to deal with an assault of a university staff member. The police were accused of using excessive force, and video footage appears to a show a police officer using CS spray on students. This led to an investigation by the Independent Police Complaints Commission. In July 2015, one protester was found guilty of common assault, while another was found guilty of causing fear and provoking violence.

In response to his handling of the situation and other issues, Warwick Students' Union passed a Vote of No Confidence against Nigel Thrift, Vice-Chancellor of the university. A two-hour panel debate was held on the student protests, at which Thrift faced further criticism for calling students yobs. University Registrar, Ken Sloan, said that Thrift's response was "very human" claiming that Thrift had been victim to a student campaign of targeted intimidation, and had been verbally abused and spat at near his home. The Warwick for Free Education Campaign group denied any association with such attacks but claimed they "further highlight the widespread dissatisfaction and anger towards Nigel Thrift and his behaviour as VC".

==== Fossil fuel divestment ====
On 8 July 2015, the university committed to divesting from fossil fuels, and placing its investments elsewhere when an opportunity becomes available. This came in the wake of a successful student campaign, and union referendum at which 65% of voters supported divestment. At the time of the decision, the university held no direct investments in any of the 200 largest fossil fuel companies, but did hold indirect investments, which it pledged to eliminate.

==== Disaffiliations from the National Union of Students (NUS) ====
In February 2023, the student body voted to leave the National Union of Students in the Spring 2023 All Student Vote, a group of generally binding referendums put forward by students to be voted on by the student body. The primary arguments made for leaving were over allegations of antisemitism within the body and the £30,000/year membership costs. The vote was 42.1% in favour, with 35.9% voting against and 22% abstaining.

It subsequently voted to reaffiliate in the autumn 2023 term's All Student Vote, with the primary arguments for reaffiliating being that the prior vote to disaffiliate "received only 42.1% of votes in favour, with a large proportion (more than 20%) of students abstaining", the fact the NUS was "the formal national body for representing students", that "its lobbying secured £243 million for university hardship funds during the cost of living crisis", that the disaffiliation campaign was heavily criticised for its treatment of Jewish students and the Jewish Society, with the president of the society calling its treatment of JSoc and Jewish students "reductive and exploitative", and that it had not called for Students Unions to disaffiliate over the findings of the recent antisemitism report. The vote to reaffiliate passed with higher turnout than previously, an increase of 16.7%, with 64.1% voting in favour, 16.1% voting against and 19.7% abstaining.

In October 2026 the student body once again voted to leave the NUS in its Autumn 2026 All Student Vote. The motion cited NUS’s silence on global events including the "Israeli genocide", limited voting power following governance changes, and the allegation that Warwick’s FTOs had been unfairly banned from the NUS' Lead and Change conferences. The motion to deaffilliate passed with 73.9% votes in favour, 15.4% against, and 10.7% abstaining.

Warwick Conservative Society Controversy

In June 2024, the Sunday Times broke a story about the University of Warwick Conservative Association's (UWCA) Chairman's Dinner. Video evidence from the event shows members and attendees dancing to Erika, a Nazi-era German marching song. According to the article, some members later chanted "Kill the Hughs", apparently substituting the word "Jews" with the first name of recently departed association chairman Hugh Herring, and declared: "Heil the chairman."

Warwick Students' Union subsequently suspended the UWCA for up to 90 days pending an external investigation by the university, after widespread condemnation in the media and by student groups who coordinated a collective statement calling for action, including the disbandment of the UWCA.

== Students' Union building ==
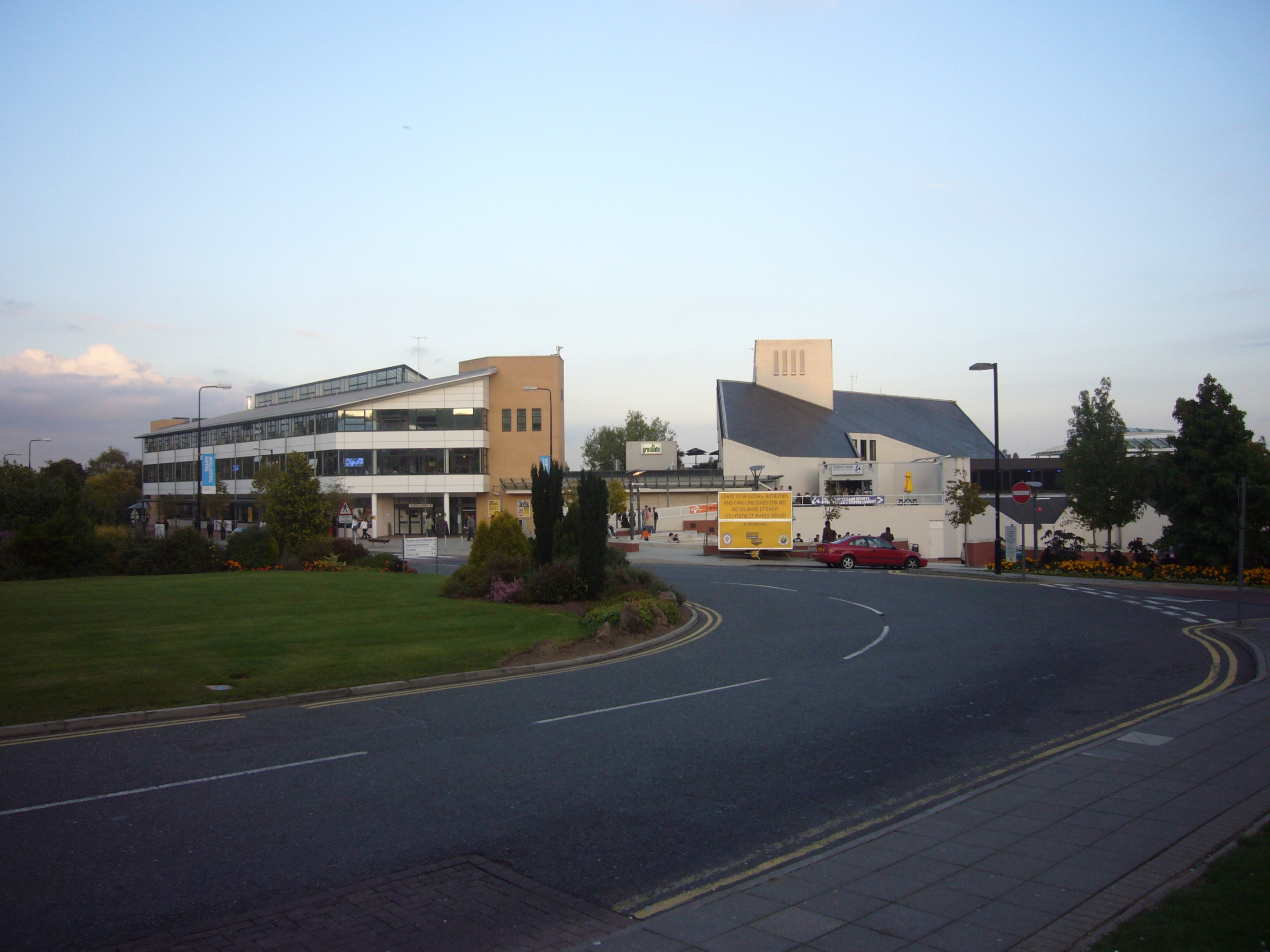
University of Warwick Students' Union (pre-rebuild)

The Union consists of Union South (largely food, drink and entertainment) and Union North (mostly administration, offices and meeting rooms).

The Students' Union got its first building, Union South, in 1975, after a long struggle with the university under Vice-Chancellor Jack Butterworth, who said to Will Fitzgerald (President of the Union in 1970–1): "the Students' Union will never have its own building." Union North was added in the 1990s and, until recently, was linked to Union South by the 'link corridor.'

=== Union South rebuild ===
The Union South building underwent a £11 million refurbishment in spring 2008, which was completed in January 2010. The new facilities included a club and gig venue, The Copper Rooms, a pub, The Dirty Duck, a sandwich bar, The Bread Oven (now called The Food Station), a drinks bar, The Terrace Bar, a tea room, Curiositea, branches of Santander and Barclays banks, a pharmacy, a travel agent, spaces for societies and a pool room.

== Union companies ==
The Union has four subsidiary companies:

- Student Union Services Warwick Limited (Registered company number: 02197761)
- Membership Solutions Limited (Registered company number: 05525449)
- Warwick Students Union Services Limited, (Registered company number: 01187495) (mostly dormant and retained due to contracts held in its name)
- Students' Union Warwick Events Limited (Registered company number: 06371766)

In the style of the University of Warwick itself, the Union has an entrepreneurial strategy. Unlike many other British universities, which have privatised halls of accommodation and catering facilities, Warwick provides all of these in-house through its many subsidiaries. With Warwick SU, its entrepreneurial strategy occurs through Membership Solutions Limited, an IT company which currently provides website services and other solutions for membership organisations (such as other UK university student unions) across the UK.

== Union Awards ==
=== Societies Awards ===
Category	2022/23	2023/24	2024/25	2025/26
Best Society Collaboration	PLAN x RAG 'Warwick Drag Race'	Warwick Tap	Warwick Student Arts Festival 2024	46th Warwick University Real Ale Festival
Biggest Impact	93% Club	93% Club	Not awarded	Not awarded
Society campaign of the Year	African & Caribbean Society 'Culture Week'	RAW	Charity Week Campaign (Islamic Society)	Cost of Living Campaign (93% Club)
Most Creative Society	Fetish Society	Not awarded	Not awarded	Not awarded
Most Improved Society	Warwick Real Estate and Construction	Warwick Tap	Warwick Finance Societies	STAR
Best New Society	PLAN	Warwick Postgraduate Society	Warwick Future Female Lawyers Society	Run Club
Recognition for Outstanding Contributions to Societies	Izzy Bailey, Serena Lola, Eva Zaat, Lanella Wall, Roshni Bachani	Rowan, Thivyaa Rahulan, Emily Garrett, Adam Skrzymowski, Charlotte Pemberton, Tom Paddock	Josh Heng, Jupiter Stevenson, Daphne Poirier, Amelia Thomas, Milly Owen	Dae Pomeroy, Eva Zaat, Jemma Marlow, Madeleine Deeks, Rory Cupit
Society Exec Member of the Year	Adam Qayyum	Malcolm Low	Amelia Coleman	Amelia Glover
Society of the year	Harry Potter and Quadball Society	Warwick Student Cinema	Warwick Medical Society	EQHO Hip Hop Dance
Most Welcoming Society	Bubble Tea Society	Bubble Tea Society	Bubble Tea Society	Pantomime
Biggest Society Publicity of the Year	Not awarded	Bubble Tea Society	Warwick Student Cinema	ABACUS
Most Innovative Society	Not awarded	The Boar	Tech Crew	Not awarded

=== Student Voice and Impact Awards ===
The Student Voice and Impact Awards recognise and celebrate students who advocate and create change for the student experience, including Course Reps, Execs, Activists & Campaigners.

Categories	2020/21
Academic Society of the Year	Warwick Academic Medicine Society
Outstanding Contribution to Sustainability	Kimia Talebi & Eseosa Akojie
Part-Time Officer of the Year	Evelin Sanderson-Nichols
SU Committee Member of the Year	Katya Johnson
SU Committee of the Year	Liberation & Diversity Committee
Faculty/Department Rep of the Year	Jasmine Brittan
Jacquie Page Award for Outstanding Contribution to Democracy	Lucy Morris
Kevin Gately Award for Student Activism	Amara Okoye
Course Rep of the Year	Megan Kelly
Making a Difference in the Community	Sana Mittar
Outstanding Leadership	Maria Kariuki
Student Wellbeing Champion	Ellie Raine
SSLC of the Year	PPE UG
Campaigning for Change	Toluwa Lipede & Abigail G-Medhin}

== Notable people ==
- Lord Kerslake, former Head of the Home Civil Service, was General Secretary from 1977 to 1978.
- The Conservative MP David Davis stood for the position of president during his attendance at Warwick, but failed to win. He also founded Radio Warwick, the student radio station.
- Claire Horton, was chief executive from 2002 to 2008.
