= Mary Tealby =

English animal welfare campaigner

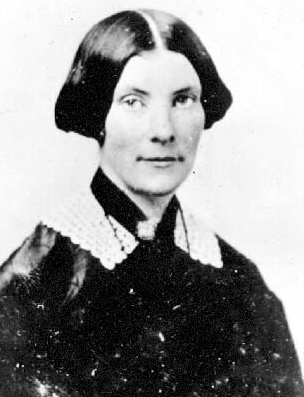
- Born: Mary Bates; 30 December 1801; Huntingdon, England
- Died: 3 October 1865 (aged 63); Biggleswade, England
- Occupation: Animal welfare campaigner
- Known for: Founding Battersea Dogs' Home
- Spouse: Robert Chapman Tealby (m. 1829; div. 1860)

Mary Tealby (née Bates; 30 December 1801 – 3 October 1865) was an English animal welfare campaigner. She is noted for founding the Battersea Dogs' Home. It was founded in Holloway, London in 1860 and moved to Battersea in 1871.

== Life ==
Tealby was born in Huntingdon in 1801. She gained a younger brother who like her father was named Edward. He would in time be the curate at Kelmarsh in Northamptonshire. She married, Robert Chapman Tealby, in 1829. They lived in Hull and they had no children. Whilst she was there, the first branch of the Society for the Prevention of Cruelty to Animals (it became the RSPCA in 1840) was formed by a group of men. Tealby is presumed to have been a supporter. She and Robert separated and this may initially have been so that she could care for her mother in London. She died in Holloway in 1854. She kept her married name and went to live with her father and her brother. Her brother had moved his career to Clipston, Northamptonshire where he was at the school when he was appointed to be master of the medical school of Clipston Hospital at £100 a year in 1856. For some reason he gave up this position and moved to London in 1860. The three of them had a modest lifestyle and they employed two servants. Tealby divorced her husband in the same year.

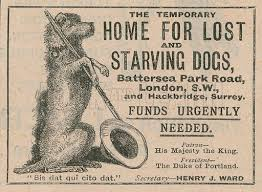
Advert for the home she founded in 1901 (long after she died)

She was still a member and supporter of the RSPCA. She cared for an abandoned dog that had been found by her friend Sarah Major, but it died and she decided to set up a place where abandoned dogs could be cared for. She called it "The Temporary Home for Lost and Starving Dogs" and it was founded in North London in 1860. Initially the home was in her scullery but as the number of dogs delivered to her grew she hired some nearby stables funded by herself, her brother and Sarah Major. The costs were met by asking for donations and Tealby and Major found several generous backers. In 1860 the RSPCA agreed to assist and the committee meetings were held at the RSPCA offices at 12 Pall Mall. The Islington Gazette and the English Churchman were supportive and Punch predictably made jokes. The home for dogs moved to Battersea where it gained some resistance from sleepless neighbours. The Times ran a story ridiculing the idea of opening a "home" for dogs when there were homeless people in London. The paper did not name her but it accused her of "letting her zeal ...outrun her discretion". Despite this the home attracted supporters, and its most impressive supporter in the 1860s was Charles Dickens. He had a huge following and was an enthusiastic but realistic dog supporter. He wrote about a "remarkable institution" that had saved "over a thousand" dogs in 1860. He noted that the dogs were cared for but if necessary humanely disposed of. By 1864 the finances were sound and they were handling 2,000 dogs that year.

Tealby died in Biggleswade in 1865 and she was buried at Church of St Andrew, Biggleswade. Sarah Major and her brother reinvigorated the home after the loss of the founder. Until the 1980s the annual report started with an acknowledgement of the home's founder.

== Legacy ==
The Battersea home continued and in 1883 it took in cats as well. In 2015, Queen Elizabeth II unveiled a plaque to officially open the intake kennels named after their founder, Mary Tealby kennels. In the same year, a plaque was erected in Islington.
