= Victoria Wood: As Seen on TV =

British television comedy sketch series (1985–1987)

- Opening title
- Genre: Comedy
- Created by: Victoria Wood
- Starring: Victoria Wood; Julie Walters; Celia Imrie; Duncan Preston; Patricia Routledge; Susie Blake; Kenny Ireland
- Country of origin: United Kingdom
- Original language: English
- No. of series: 2
- No. of episodes: 13 (list of episodes)

Production
- Producer: Geoff Posner
- Running time: 30 minutes

Original release
- Network: BBC2
- Release: 11 January 1985 – 18 December 1987

Victoria Wood: As Seen on TV is a British comedy sketch series written by and starring comedian Victoria Wood, with appearances from Julie Walters, Celia Imrie, Duncan Preston, Susie Blake and Patricia Routledge. The show was televised on BBC2 between 1985 and 1987 and included sketches that became famous in the United Kingdom.

The show was created when Wood was enticed away from rival television network ITV in 1984. She wrote every episode and the synopsis of it for Radio Times. The series led to spin-off script books, video tapes and DVDs.

The show won BAFTA Awards for all its episodes and, in 1996, was awarded all-time "Favourite Comedy Series" by the BBC.

The show's opening sequence is a stop motion sequence made by Aardman, known for Wallace and Gromit.

== Background ==
Wood was a television personality who spent most of her career working for the rival network ITV before As Seen on TV. She was enticed to work for the BBC with the promise of greater financial resources and a higher degree of creative authority in comparison to her previous work on shows like Wood and Walters.

To produce and direct the show, Wood chose Geoff Posner, who had worked on successful British comedy shows of the early 1980s such as Not the Nine O'Clock News, The Young Ones and the pilot of Blackadder.

Going into production in summer 1984 – with studio recordings in September and October – the first series of As Seen on TV was intended for broadcast later that year. As a theatre tie-in, Wood arranged a short stand-up tour with the same name as the show, to capitalise on her television appearances around the same time. This backfired when the BBC delayed the opening episode until early the following year.

== Recurring sketches ==
In addition to numerous standalone sketches and songs, the show featured many recurring items. Each episode began with Wood delivering a stand-up comedy monologue, often incorporating material she had previously tested during her stage tours. Throughout the following half-hour, several regular sketch items were typically included.

Linking many of the sketches was Susie Blake as a snobbish and arrogant television continuity announcer. Notable lines spoken by Blake include "We'd like to apologise to viewers in the North. It must be awful for them".

Patricia Routledge starred as Kitty, a self-righteous middle-aged spinster from Cheadle, who featured in a weekly monologue. To show the character's forthrightness, Wood had originally written Kitty's opening introduction as "Hello, I'm Kitty. I've had a boob off and I can't stomach whelks"; the "boob off" line was later changed to "I've given gallons of blood". The Kitty character shared similarities with Dotty, a character in one of Wood's earlier sketch shows, Wood and Walters (then played by Julie Walters).

Margery & Joan featured Walters (as Margery) and Wood (as Joan) parodying banal daytime television magazine shows.

Gail and Carl was a regular sketch in series one featuring Andrew Livingston and Victoria Wood as a young, naïve northern couple. For example, Carl, in response to being asked where babies come from, replies, "You want to send off for a pamphlet. We've got one at home about lagging."

The He Didn't? sketches that featured in the second series starred Wood as Kelly Marie Tunstall, a delinquent teenager standing at a bus stop telling her friend (Mary Jo Randle) ever more fanciful stories. "So, he walks over, right, an' 'e 'ad tattoos on 'is arms - anchor 'ere, microwave 'ere." "He didn't!" "He did." Each responds to the other after a ludicrous anecdote with the words "He didn't?" "He did!"

=== Acorn Antiques ===
Acorn Antiques is perhaps the best-remembered regular item from the series. It was a spoof soap opera set in an antiques shop, which, despite its provincial high street status, manages to supply an endless stream of works by Pablo Picasso, Leonardo da Vinci and Michelangelo. The two shop customers appearing at the start of each sketch, examining some antique, are always played by the same two actors. The sketch parodied the soap genre with its bad acting, ridiculous dialogue and contrived plot twists. Wood drew inspiration from the long-running ATV/Central serial Crossroads, The Cedar Tree and the BBC radio soap opera Waggoners Walk (1969–1980).

The sketches even led to a fanzine and appreciation gatherings, where fans would dress up as the characters. In 2004, in a poll on its website, Channel 4 voted Acorn Antiques the seventh best comedy sketch of all time. In 2005, Acorn Antiques was turned into a West End musical (see below).

=== Spoof documentaries ===
Each episode of As Seen on TV featured a spoof documentary of "slice of life" stories, such as a girl who wanted to swim the English Channel and an old man moving into a home. Just An Ordinary School, for example, took a look at an exclusive girl's public school, with one pupil claiming, "there are all sorts of girls here, even coloured girls, though they tend to be princesses mainly".

Another spoof was of a musical detailing the life of Bessie Bunter, entitled Bessie! The musical starts as an Andrew Lloyd Webber parody with the setting of a girl's private school but including issues such as the Spanish Civil War and the McCarthy era. On being asked about Bessie's fatness, the producer (Sir Dave) replies "it is a sort of mental fatness". The lead actress, Carla, belts out in rehearsals one of the songs, "One Day", despite insisting she has "pneumonia". To prepare for the role, she starts with the bra, and then everything falls into place. Later, "Bessie!" is completely rewritten, and the previous cast is sacked, as it is, after all, a musical about "a big fat girl." Meanwhile, Carla is crying and being comforted by her colleagues but further upset by Sir Dave telling her to "get the fuck out of here will you, Carla? We don't really want snot all over the plush, love." In this rewritten part of "Bessie," she is played by Victoria Wood, who sings an impossibly glamorous and upbeat number. However, she complains at the end that "you're going to have to change this floor."

Usually lasting around five minutes, the spoof documentaries were narrated by a largely off-screen reporter in the first series and presented primarily by Corin Huntley (Duncan Preston) in the second series. It was a continuation of style for Wood, who had previously produced similar pseudo-realistic spoofs such as The Woman Who Had 740 Children and Girls Talking for Wood and Walters.

== One-off sketches ==
Victoria Wood as Ena Sharples in a parody of 1960s-era Coronation Street

The show featured many, often acclaimed, one-off sketches, like Waitress (popularly known as Two Soups), where Julie Walters plays an elderly deaf waitress who takes an incredibly long time to take an order for two bowls of soup. In 2004, British television network Channel 4 (in a poll conducted on its website) awarded it "27th Best Comedy Sketch Of All Time". Walters said "she [Wood] knows I like playing old women. Why? Because I am one! I love the shape of them."

Classic Coronation Street was a recreation of 1960s Coronation Street. It starred Wood as the show's gossiping Ena Sharples, with Julie Walters as Martha Longhurst and Lill Roughley as Minnie Caldwell, with Ena telling them the "gossip" she has heard about the show's plotlines for the next two decades. The sketch was written with a detailed knowledge of the soap opera's past: "That stuck up Ida Barlow, who's no better than she should be... it'll not be too long before she falls under a bus! That Harry Hewitt'll likely get crushed under the axle of his own van, and as for Valerie Barlow – and if this isn't judgement for setting 'erself up in 'er own front parlour as a so-called hair stylist then my name isn't Ena Sharples – from what I hear, it's two clogs to a thrupenny bit that she'll electrocute 'erself with 'er own 'airdryer." This sketch's accuracy earned Wood praise from Doris Speed, who had played Annie Walker in Coronation Street from 1960 to 1983.

Giving Notes featured Walters as the leader of an amateur dramatics company giving notes to her cast: "I can't say this too often: it may be Hamlet, but it's got to be fun, fun, fun!" Shoe Shop also starred Walters as a mad shoe shop saleswoman and Wood as her customer. In the sketch she delivers Wood a pair of high-heeled shoes, though Wood requested a flat pair. Walters snaps off the heels and replies, "flatter now".

Medical School had Wood as a nervous interviewee, applying to become a medical student. Asked what the last book she read was, she replies "Othello. It's a book by William Shakespeare, of the Royal Shakespeare Company". In On The Trolley, Wood played a waitress in a restaurant, responding to any order of food with the repetitive phrases "Is it on the trolley?" and "Can you point at it?" This was Wood's personal favourite sketch in the series.

Self-Service featured Wood and Walters as two friends at a self-service café. It features many classic lines including, "Aren't prawns an aphrodisiac?" "Well, I wouldn't put it past them." and "Can we get by, we're not having a sweet." "Very wise with those hips!"

== Music ==
Music was featured regularly on the show, often with Wood singing self-penned songs while accompanying herself on the piano. The best-remembered tune from the show is the five-minute-long "The Ballad of Barry and Freda – Let's Do It." It concerns a couple, Barry and Freda; she is hungry for sex, he is not. It climaxes with the lines "beat me on the bottom with a Woman's Weekly, let's do it! Let's do it tonight!". The song was performed numerous times by Wood in her live performances. Wood said of the number: "A joy to write, a sod to learn, and I daren't finish a show without it. The first time I performed it, a woman at the stage door asked, 'How long have you been cross-eyed?'"

As Seen on TV featured other musical styles: So Pissed Off With Love, a duet with Wood and Denis Lawson; Keep On Shopping, an epic musical number about shopping; At The Chippy, with Wood, Walters, Meg Johnson and others singing in tribute to their local fish parlour; Marie And Clarie And Min, featuring Wood, Johnson and Hope Jackman as three old women on a seaside trip as well as other numbers. The show contained a skit on the old "fill in" footage often slotted into scheduling to cover technical breakdowns: "I'm Gonna Knock, Knock, Knock on Your Knocker". Comedy sketches featured music, like the parody of the staging of a West End musical, Bessie, and a send-up of the Judy Garland–Mickey Rooney "let's put on a show" genre in "I'm Counting Moonbeams".

Preferring to work with people she knew, Wood hired David Firman to be musical director for the series. Firman had previously been musical director for Wood's play Good Fun.

== Episodes ==
The series lasted for twelve regular half-hour episodes (and a final 40-minute special) between 1985 and 1987. All six episodes of the first series were broadcast between 11 January and 15 February 1985 at 9:00 pm on Friday evenings on BBC2.They followed the same format with an opening stand up monologue from Wood, followed by a mixture of sketches, songs and spoof mini-documentaries, with regular soap opera parody Acorn Antiques making its introduction. This first series reached 4.55 million viewers by the penultimate show, making it the tenth most popular programme that week on the channel. To Wood's surprise, the series then went on to win two BAFTA Awards (see below).

The second series of six episodes were broadcast between 10 November and 15 December 1986, this time on the (then) more popular Monday slot on BBC2. It followed a similar format to the first series. By the third week it was the number one most watched programme on BBC2 with 8.55 million viewers. Having scored an even bigger ratings and critical success than its previous series, its triumph even led Wood to be invited on that year's prestigious Royal Variety Performance.

Between series one and two, Wood said she thought it was a mistake to do another As Seen on TV series, and had attempted to write a play instead: "I've been seeking to branch out, but it hasn't happened. I wanted to do something different before I went back on TV." However, she soon decided that the play was "too Alan Ayckbourn", threw it away and began writing the second run instead. She aimed to write eighteen minutes of script a week. In the end, it took six months to complete, an experience she did not enjoy. "You pour everything you've got into one sketch, and you don't ever want to write another - only you realize there are fifty-nine more to go before you've got enough for a series; it's torment."

The series returned for a 40-minute special on 18 December 1987. Wood defined "special" as "ten minutes longer and I've splashed out on a new bra".

She said of her decision to finish the show: "I love television, and if it was possible for me to work in it more, then I would; but because of the position I've put myself in of being the only writer on the show, I can't physically work in it that often. I've just had it with sketch shows for a bit – people have liked it, and I want to stop while they still like it."

The Radio Times Guide to TV Comedy described Victoria Wood: As Seen on TV as having "a regular company of fine performers, good production values, incisive scripts and a snappy pace... the show rarely dipped below brilliant and featured numerous delights, such as Wood's hilariously authentic dialogue and her surprisingly stinging satirical characters".

== Cast ==
Celia Imrie, Victoria Wood, Julie Walters and Duncan Preston in the first series

Wood used a regular ensemble of actors in the series, Julie Walters, Celia Imrie and Duncan Preston, with Susie Blake and Patricia Routledge doing weekly spots.

Julie Walters was a long-term collaborator of Wood's, although unlike Wood and Walters, their previous television series together, only Wood's name remained in the title. This was because in the interim, Wood was getting viewers of it turning up to her solo stand-up shows expecting to see a double act. This did not stop Wood making Walters almost as prominent in this newer series. She played many two handers with Wood as well as other roles such as daytime television host Margery, a mad shoe shop lady, the elderly waitress in the Two Soups sketch, and a transsexual hairdresser. Most famously, she played cleaning lady Mrs. Overall in Acorn Antiques. She later revealed that alongside her starring role in Educating Rita, it's the part she's still recognised the most by the public for.

Duncan Preston (who appeared in Wood's 1981 teleplay Happy Since I Met You) was cast in weekly roles. He had even turned down the chance to play Shakespeare and an offer of a world tour as Hotspur in Henry IV, Part One at the same time. Preston later said, "I was at a crossroads, and I had the choice of going straight or going off at a tangent with Victoria, I chose the latter and she changed my life". Most famously playing the recurring role of Clifford in Acorn Antiques, he advertised a men's bra, was "Corin Huntley" – a documentary presenter – and was the voice of the monster Crayola in Wood's parody of Doctor Who. Wood said of Duncan, "He hasn't been exploited properly in the show because I tend to write parts for women, which is fair enough, but it does mean that Duncan plays the bank manager or the man in the hotel. I don't like men's men. Duncan's mainly the sort of man who likes women, so you can talk to him about your ovaries, and it causes no embarrassment". Preston said he was cast "because I was so tall".

Celia Imrie was a long-standing friend of Wood and had even been in the studio audience when Wood performed on the TV talent show New Faces in 1974. However, it was when Wood saw her act in a show by BBC Scotland called Eighty-One Take Two that she was impressed enough to hire her friend for the show. Imrie played various roles throughout the run, like a co-presenter of McConomy (a spoof TV economy show), and most famously Miss Babs in Acorn Antiques. Imrie said in 2007, "Miss Babs is still what I'm best known for, even though I don't go around with bright yellow hair." During her run in As Seen on TV Imrie received a fan letter from playwright Alan Bennett. "He wrote a card to me saying he adored Miss Babs. You can't imagine how thrilling that was. I still have that card today." Imrie though believes that the praise should go to Wood's writing: "Every word is of huge importance and crafted to perfection. It was a wonderful, happy accident that I met her."

Wood spotted Susie Blake in a musical at the King's Head Theatre and cast her in the role of the opinionated continuity announcer. Wood said of her casting at the time, "I didn't think of her particularly for the continuity announcer, but she came in and could do it, just like that. I'd love to cast her in a song-and-dance number – I feel so sorry for her always having to wear those terrible blouses." When As Seen On TV ended Blake said "I'm very sad that this is the last time we will all work together but I understand why Vic wanted to stop. Anyway, there were only two series of Fawlty Towers and, as far as I'm concerned, this rates with it, so I'm sure it'll be shown lots of times".

Patricia Routledge starred as Kitty, the self-righteous spinster from Cheadle in weekly monologues. Routledge had appeared in a monologue before in Alan Bennett's 1982 play A Woman of No Importance. In 1999, as part of Comic Relief, Wood parodied Routledge in Wetty Hainthropp Investigates, a spoof of Routledge's BBC1 detective series Hetty Wainthropp Investigates.

Semi-regulars in the show included Jim Broadbent, who'd previously appeared with Wood in the London staging of her play Talent. He appeared in such parts as a sleazy press photographer and a telephone deodorising engineer. Lill Roughley, who Wood first spotted when she worked with her then husband Geoffrey Durham in 1977, was given various roles, such as impersonating Coronation Street's Minnie Caldwell. Mary Jo Randle, as well as playing Kelly-Marie Tunstall's friend, appeared as an actress who hadn't worked for three years in the spoof documentary To Be An Actress.

Wood hired many actors she had previously worked with and felt she could trust, such as Peter Ellis, Meg Johnson, Kay Adshead and Sue Wallace. Wood hired several celebrities for the show including Frank Bruno, Denis Healey, Claire Rayner, Pete Postlethwaite, Maureen Lipman, Hope Jackman, Molly Weir, Henry Kelly, Dora Bryan and Anne Reid (who would star with Wood again in her sitcom dinnerladies from 1998 to 2000; Kelly and Bryan made guest appearances in the sitcom).

== Awards ==
As Seen on TV was a highly acclaimed show in the United Kingdom by the time it ended in 1987. Wood, having just received a BAFTA for the first series, said at the time: "I was very pleased to win, but it really put pressure on me. I was already writing the new series and every time I looked at the award, I kept on thinking that people would be expecting so much more now, and I just wouldn't be able to live up to it. In the end, I just put the thing away." The series then went on to win BAFTAs for its entire run.

First series	Broadcasting Press Award
First series	BAFTA	Best Light Entertainment Programme (awarded to producer Geoff Posner)
First series	BAFTA	Best Light Entertainment Performance (Victoria Wood)
Second series	BAFTA	Best Light Entertainment Programme (awarded to Geoff Posner)
Christmas special	BAFTA	Best Light Entertainment Programme (awarded to Geoff Posner)

In 1996, the BBC celebrated its 60th anniversary with an awards ceremony titled Auntie's All Time Greats. In it, As Seen on TV beat Monty Python's Flying Circus for "Favourite Comedy Series". It beat the same show again when it won 'best sketch show' in the Radio Times Comedy Poll in 2001.

As Seen on TV was given regular repeats on BBC1 and BBC2 until 1995. The show was not repeated on television again until November 2007, when British satellite TV station UKTV Gold began airing As Seen on TV in a regular afternoon slot.

Both series are currently available on Netflix.

== Revivals ==
Although the show ended in 1987, elements of it have been revived by the cast from time to time. Wood and Walters both appeared as Margery and Joan in a sketch for Red Nose Day 1988 – A Night of Comic Relief, broadcast live. Acorn Antiques has been revived many times: firstly, Mrs Overall briefly returned in 1992's Victoria Wood's All Day Breakfast. Secondly, Acorn Antiques was briefly brought back for an episode in 2001, featuring the original cast and Nick Frost as an armed robber. In 2005 it was revived by Wood as a West End theatre production Acorn Antiques: The Musical!, starring the original cast and directed by Trevor Nunn. Limited to a 16-week sold-out run, it then toured with a brand-new cast, this time directed by Wood herself.

== Script books ==
Joan (Victoria Wood) and Margery (Julie Walters). This sketch was "revived" and introduced the script book Barmy.

There have been two books published featuring scripts from As Seen On TV. Up To You, Porky (published in 1985) features scripts from the first series mixed in with extracts from Wood and Walters and Wood's stage show Lucky Bag. In 1987, the follow-up Barmy was published, featuring sketches entirely collated from As Seen on TV. Barmy features a Margery and Joan sketch specially written as an introduction to the book, where they review forthcoming novels. Exclusive to this book are two sketches cut from the original broadcast, 'Lady Police Serial', a parody of the long-running Juliet Bravo, where Wood as Juliet chats to her Desk Sergeant Wilberforce. 'Craft Shop', where the owner (Rosalind March) tries to tempt her customer (Celia Imrie) with the likes of "Ukrainian Prayer Shawls, woven by the mothers of Russian dissidents whilst in a state of euphoria, which doesn't happen very often which is why we've only got three."

== Home media ==
For a series so lauded, its commercial release was for many years limited to compilations, with only a full commercial release of the entire series 20 years after the show ended. Initially, a best of series one VHS was released by BBC Video in 1986 and rereleased in 1989, with a sub-heading "The Very Best Now on Video". The series was then issued on DVD in 2002 as a 90-minute compilation titled Best of Victoria Wood: As Seen on TV. It was not until 2 April 2007 that the entire series (including the Christmas special) was finally released, in a two-disc DVD set. It was classified a 12 certificate, as it "Contains infrequent bleeped language and moderate sex references". In 1993, a VHS compilation with the Acorn Antiques sketches was released on BBC Video. A DVD reissue followed in 2005.

Audio highlights were made into two half-hour shows for Radio 4. They were broadcast on 18 and 25 August 1992. Audio highlights of the show were released over two cassettes by the BBC in 1991.

== Radio Times synopsis ==
At the time of the original broadcasts, as well as writing and appearing in the show, Wood wrote its programme synopsis for the broadcast listings magazine Radio Times. All were misleading, with little or nothing to do with the contents of the actual broadcast. The entry for the first show on 8 January 1985 said:

'Chipper' Patel arrived from New Delhi in 1962 with an artificial leg and five pounds in his pocket. He now controls a multi-million-pound vinyl flooring empire. He didn't want to be filmed. So here's a tatty old comedy programme with some women in it.

These continued throughout the original broadcast run:

'The last of the series. 47: Managing Without Opera. It's the third week of the experiment. How are Hannah and Gavin coping? Why is their sitting-room pale green? Why can't they laugh without showing their gums? What's on the other side?

Other entries make reference to Mendelssohn, Anita Harris and others who would make no appearance on the actual show.
