= Linda McDermott Late Show =

Radio programme

Linda McDermott Show
- Presenting career
- Station: Previously: BBC Radio Merseyside
- Style: Radio programme
- Country: United Kingdom

Linda McDemott Late Show is a chat and music show on BBC Radio Merseyside which aired for sixteen years until 6 October 2023.

== History ==
The Late Show was also known as 'The Under The Duvet Club' and featured discussion, interviews, live music, guests, food tasting, nostalgia nights and more. The show also often aired on BBC Radio Cumbria and BBC Radio Lancashire Host of the show, Linda McDermott has presented other shows such as Morning Merseyside for over seven years. In 2008, McDermott broadcast live for three hours in storm force seas during the 50th Battle of the Atlantic commemorations and also hosted coverage of the Tall Ships parade in the same year.

In October 2023, due to BBC Local Radio cuts, the programme finished, with listeners sharing their thoughts and views. A book about the programme is set to be released, although a date is to be confirmed.

== Awards ==
In 2017, host Linda McDermott was awarded a Liverpool Citizen Of Honour for her work at BBC Radio Merseyside, elected only the second woman President in the 138-year history of Liverpool Press Club. McDermott is Patron of several Merseyside organisations and charities.
