= Linda McDermott =

Radio presenter

- Born: 23 May; Liverpool, England
- Presenting career
- Stations: Liverpool Live Radio (2024-present), BBC Radio Merseyside (until 2023)
- Station: Previously: BBC Radio 5 Live
- Style: Radio presenter
- Country: United Kingdom

Linda McDermott is an English radio presenter and former broadcast journalist, from Liverpool, England, best known for her Late Night Show on Liverpool Live Radio and previously BBC Radio Merseyside.

== Career ==
McDermott began working as a broadcast journalist and reporter, becoming one of the first female football reporters in the United Kingdom. She is best known for her 'Under The Duvet' Linda McDermott Late Show show on BBC Radio Merseyside. The show often airs on BBC Radio Cumbria and BBC Radio Lancashire She has previously worked as a journalist and reporter for Liverpool Echo. As a presenter, she has presented other shows such as Morning Merseyside for over seven years. McDermott once trained with the Army for one week, in which she was given the role of Major. McDermott has interviewed the likes of Oprah Winfrey, in which she once sold a coat to her. In 2008, McDermott broadcast live for three hours in storm force seas during the 50th Battle of the Atlantic commemorations and also hosted coverage of the Tall Ships parade in the same year. McDermott has also hosted shows on BBC Radio 5 Live and previously written and narrated documentaries for National Geographic’s Discovery Channel.

In 2002, McDermott suffered a car crash into a skip and spent one month in hospital. She later returned to her broadcasting work.

In 2023, McDermott announced that her popular Late Night Show will come to an end in October, due to BBC Local Radio cuts, with listeners sharing their thoughts and views. Her final show ended on early Saturday morning of 1am on 7 October 2023. McDermott later announced she is working on a book about her life and radio career. On 20 October 2024, McDermott returned to radio, presenting her 'Under The Duvet Club' on independent radio station Liverpool Live Radio on a Sunday evening.

== Awards ==
In 2017, McDermott was awarded a Liverpool Citizen Of Honour for her work at BBC Radio Merseyside, elected only the second woman President in the 138-year history of Liverpool Press Club. McDermott is Patron of several Merseyside organisations and charities.
