= List of Dinnerladies episodes =

Episodes of British sitcom

The new Complete Collection (left), Series 1 (middle) and Series 2 (right) DVD covers of the series.

dinnerladies is a British sitcom that was created and written by Victoria Wood. It was broadcast on BBC One in the United Kingdom, and ran for two series from 1998 to 2000, totalling sixteen episodes.

The programme depicts the day-to-day lives of staff in the canteen of a factory in Manchester, and the developing relationship between Brenda Furlong (Wood) and canteen manager Tony Martin (Andrew Dunn), as well as their colleagues: prudish Dolly Bellfield (Thelma Barlow) and her friend Jean (Anne Reid), snarky Twinkle (Maxine Peake), ditzy Anita (Shobna Gulati) and maintenance man Stan Meadowcroft (Duncan Preston). Celia Imrie and Julie Walters also appear as HR manager Philippa and Bren's mother respectively. Although the show features many other secondary characters, scenes never take place outside the canteen set, with other situations either being described by characters or (in the penultimate and final episodes) watched by the characters on a television.

The first series of six episodes began airing on 12 November 1998 and ended on 17 December 1998; the second, which had ten episodes, aired from 25 November 1999 to 27 January 2000; Wood deliberately ended the show after two series, citing the short run and quality of Fawlty Towers as one of her reasons for doing so. The show was filmed in a traditional American sitcom style with a multiple-camera setup and before a live studio audience. It is now repeated on Gold, and has been released on DVD. The first series won the 1999 Rose d'Or Press Award and "Best New TV Comedy" at the 1999 British Comedy Awards, and the second won "Best TV Comedy" in 2000.

== Series overview ==
Series	Episodes	Originally released	
Series	Episodes	First released	Last released
1	6	12 November 1998	17 December 1998
2	10	25 November 1999	27 January 2000

== Episodes ==
=== Series 1 (1998) ===
No. overall	No. in series	Title	Directed by	Written by	Original release date	UK viewers (millions)
1	1	"Monday"	Geoff Posner	Victoria Wood	12 November 1998	12.24
It is a typical Monday in the canteen. Jean is frantically preparing for her daughter's wedding, but while she searches for an accordionist, Lisa has an attack of nerves and gets married in secret. Bren and Dolly discuss the weekend's television offerings in great detail and Twinkle arrives late again. New Human Resources manager Philippa Moorcroft tries to rope everyone in to a group Scottish country dancing session, without much success. Meanwhile, Tony tries to keep everyone focused on actually making some food. Guest stars: Julia Booth as Girl, Sue Devaney as Secretary (Jane), Gordon Glenn as Accordionist, Christopher Greet as Mr. Michael, Jane Hazlegrove as Lisa, Katisha Kenyon as Carly, Bernard Wrigley as Man, and Julie Walters as Petula
2	2	"Royals"	Geoff Posner	Victoria Wood	19 November 1998	10.59
The dinnerladies are very excited about an impending royal visit, though they are not impressed to find out that they have been allocated Prince James, The Duke of Danby, with the exception of Stan, who met him thirty years earlier at Catterick Garrison army base. Despite much rehearsing, Twinkle finds she is unable to string a sentence together, while Anita's mouth runs away with her on the topic of nipples. Dolly and Jean compete with each other to perform the best curtsey, and Bren is shocked at the Duke's love of sex and bacon. Guest stars: Richenda Carey as Lady Pamela, Christopher Greet as Mr. Michael, Steve Huison as Man Worker (Steve Greengrass), Lesley Nicol as Woman Worker, Graham Seed as David; Special guest: Simon Williams as The Duke of Danby
3	3	"Scandal"	Geoff Posner	Victoria Wood	26 November 1998	9.46
Bren is horrified when her flatulent mother Petula moves into the car park with her 16-year-old fiancé Clint (Kenny Doughty). His mother Shelagh forms a picket line around the factory, with the national press in attendance. As deliveries gradually stop arriving due to the mob outside, Bren suggests an impromptu Oprah Winfrey-style talk show to resolve the matter; they arrange this with the help of local journalist Carmel (Lynda Baron), but Clint decides to leave Petula after talking to Twinkle. Meanwhile, a TV researcher visits the canteen to see whether the dinner ladies would make good docu-soap material, but Tony is worried about them filming his cancer treatment. Guest stars: Ashley Barker as Simon, Lynda Baron as Carmel, Sue Devaney as Secretary (Jane), Kenny Doughty as Clint, Christopher Greet as Mr. Michael, Lill Roughley as Shelagh, Dolly Wells as Hannah, and Julie Walters as Petula
4	4	"Moods"	Geoff Posner	Victoria Wood	3 December 1998	9.53
Tony and Bren arrive early to the canteen in much better moods than usual. Unfortunately, everyone else is in a bad temper. Stan has had trouble with his father, Dolly and Jean bicker continuously, Anita is convinced her new haircut makes her look like Fatima Whitbread, and Twinkle thinks she is pregnant. Philippa suggests having a "Bring Your Mother To Work" day to cheer everyone up, though Dolly's sarcastic mother Enid (Thora Hird) and Jean's nymphomaniac mother Connie (Dora Bryan) do little to raise the workers' spirits. Stan brings his father, Jim (Eric Sykes) and Petula arrives with an old lady who she says is her own mother. Guest stars: Liz Hume-Dawson as Woman in Queue, Sue Devaney as 1st Secretary (Jane), Jackie Downey as Bev, Judy Flynn as 2nd Secretary (Val), Rachel Gleaves as Kirsty, Elspet Gray as Hilary, Anthony Renshaw as Veg Man, Shireen Shah as Reena, Katharine Page as Violet, and Julie Walters as Petula; Special guests: Dora Bryan as Connie, Dame Thora Hird as Enid, Eric Sykes as Jim
5	5	"Party"	Geoff Posner	Victoria Wood	10 December 1998	8.85
A merger with a Japanese company means that the factory's Christmas party has an Oriental theme to it. Tony and Bren plan to go as a couple, but Petula invites herself along as Bren's partner. Dolly and Jean are not impressed with their husbands' flirtatious and ignorant behaviour; Anita gets very drunk at the party and makes a fool of herself, while Twinkle and her friend Tiffany are unimpressed by the older workers' dancing. Petula flings herself at every man in sight, including Jean's husband Keith. Bren and Tony try to salvage their night together, fending off the respective advances of Stan and Jean, but Petula mistakes Tony for Stan, and messes things up for Bren. Guest stars: Christopher Greet as Mr. Michael, Ann-Louise Grimshaw as Tiffany, Eiji Kusuhara as Mr. Tashimoto, Adam Leese as Hugo, Peter Lorenzelli as Keith, Kate Robbins as Babs, Jack Smethurst as Bob, and Julie Walters as Petula
6	6	"Nightshift"	Geoff Posner	Victoria Wood	17 December 1998	9.43
An unexpected order comes in, prompting the factory manager to ask all the staff, including the dinnerladies, to work a 24-hour shift. With Tony off work having chemotherapy for his cancer, obnoxious temporary manager Nicola Bodeux gives the staff a hard time, resulting in Dolly, Jean, Anita and Twinkle walking out. Realising her constant failure to connect with people, Nicola then resigns and decides to become a lighthouse keeper. Bren prepares for the impossible task of manning the canteen single-handedly all night, but the others, including Tony, return to help. Guest stars: Sue Devaney as Secretary (Jane), Christopher Greet as Mr. Michael, David Hatton as Man in Queue, Sue Wallace as Nicola Bodeux, Ozzie Yue as Malcolm

=== Series 2 (1999–2000) ===
Each episode of the second series is set on a specific date which appears as a caption at the beginning of the episode, to put the progress of various storylines into perspective.

No. overall	No. in series	Title	Directed by	Written by	Set on	Original release date	UK viewers (millions)
7	1	"Catering"	Geoff Posner	Victoria Wood	Friday 9 April 1999	25 November 1999	13.86
Gormless work experience girl Sigourney (Joanne Froggatt) has trouble finding the canteen, and when the decorators arrive early they cause trouble by accidentally trapping Glenda the bread lady behind a fifteen-foot ladder. They must cut it and free her before her weak bladder causes her to have an accident, but they need permission from the ladder's owner, who cannot be reached by phone. Jane from Planning (Sue Devaney) arrives, and they play a game involving a blindfolded Jane being hit over the head with a tin tray while listening to belly-dancing music. Guest stars: Sue Cleaver as Glen, Helen Cotterill as Betty, Sue Devaney as Jane, Colin Edwynn as Bert, Liam Fox as Derwent, Joanne Froggatt as Sigourney, Kevin Maxwell as Paul
8	2	"Trouble"	Geoff Posner	Victoria Wood	Monday 21 June 1999	2 December 1999	13.41
There is trouble afoot after Jean's husband leaves her for a Welsh dental hygienist, prompting Jean to pick fights with everyone. Meanwhile, an anonymous bunch of flowers sent to Bren provokes rumours of a secret lover (they are actually from Stan to thank her for helping his father), and Anita's continual stories about her new boyfriend bore the others. Tony invites Bren on Jane's holiday; after losing her place, it opens up again after Steve Greengrass is injured. Bren's elderly mother claims to be pregnant by Leonardo DiCaprio. Guest stars: Linda Bassett as Peggy, Sue Devaney as Jane, Judy Flynn as Val, Steve Huison as Steve, Jonathan Magnanti as Man, Kaleem Janjua as Reg, and Julie Walters as Petula
9	3	"Holidays"	Geoff Posner	Victoria Wood	Thursday 5 August 1999	9 December 1999	13.64
Everyone is very excited about their holidays – Bren and Tony are going to Marbella and Dolly is going on a luxury cruise. Petula's caravan blows up, prompting her to ask Bren for her holiday money to fix it. Although her workmates tell her she should keep the money and tell selfish Petula to find it elsewhere, Stan's poem reflecting on his father's death prompts Bren to give it to her. Meanwhile, Dolly and Anita discuss breast implants and biryanis. Absent: Anne Reid as Jean; Guest stars: Sue Devaney as Jane, Adrian Hood as Norman, Steve Huison as Steve, Peter Martin as Peter, Kate Robbins as Babs, Graham Turner as Pieman, and Julie Walters as Petula
10	4	"Fog"	Geoff Posner	Victoria Wood	Monday 1 November 1999	16 December 1999	13.20
The November fog has allowed a convicted murderer to escape from Strangeways prison, just a few miles away from the factory. The National Blood Service comes to encourage people to donate – Bren's secret fear of needles means she feels faint whenever they are mentioned and refuses to give blood, causing her colleagues to speculate that she might be pregnant. Jean talks about her "handsome" new boyfriend but when he arrives to pick her up, Philippa panics and calls the police, thinking he is the escaped convict. In the confusion, the real fugitive, disguised as one of the nurses, escapes. Philippa tries to pluck up the courage to leave Mr Michael and is furious when he dumps her just before she gets round to it. Guest stars: Sue Cleaver as Glenda, Howard Crossley as Barry, Angela Curran as Customer, Sue Devaney as Jane, Mark Drewry as Tom, Christopher Greet as Mr. Michael, Nick Malinowski as Policeman, Tina Malone as Bobbie, Christine Moore as Woman, Gillian Perry as Customer, Paul Rider as Sue
11	5	"Gamble"	Geoff Posner	Victoria Wood	Tuesday 21 December 1999	23 December 1999	9.35
Tony and Bren's developing relationship is the subject of a bet between the dinnerladies and the Planning department: if they "get it on" before Christmas, the canteen staff win £50. Bren and Tony spark gossip when they turn up late together the next day, but this is due to Bren accompanying Tony to a late-night hospital appointment. Meanwhile, Philippa looks forward to having sex at Christmas, Dolly searches for novelty hot-water bottles and Anita's awful taste in Christmas presents appalls the rest of the team. Just after Tony and Bren finally have their first kiss, a most unexpected visitor arrives: Bren's husband, Martin. Guest stars: Sue Devaney as Jane, Mark Drewry as Tom, Adrian Hood as Norman, Liz Hume-Dawson as Girl, Brian Stephens as Martin, Graham Turner as Pieman, Bernard Wrigley as Bob
12	6	"Christmas"	Geoff Posner	Victoria Wood	Thursday 23 December 1999; Into Friday 24 December 1999	24 December 1999	9.20
After revealing that she was married (but separated), Bren begins to doubt her relationship with Tony, and his secretive actions eventually make her decide to dump him and resign from the canteen. However, just as she is about to tell him this, he reveals a huge surprise birthday party for her, and the pair fly up to Scotland to spend Christmas with his friends. The other caterers also receive presents out of their bran tub (Stan gets a cheap watch from Jean, Tony is given bacon by Twinkle and Twinkle receives a china horse from Dolly). Meanwhile, Philippa has a crush on a co-worker and Anita mysteriously leaves before the party with a mumbled excuse... Guest stars: Sue Devaney as Jane, Rachel Gleaves as Customer, Christopher Greet as Mr. Michael, Janette Tough as Janice (credited as Janet Tough), Bernard Wrigley as Bob, with The Black Dyke Band, and Julie Walters as Petula
13	7	"Minnellium" [sic]	Geoff Posner	Victoria Wood	Friday 31 December 1999	30 December 1999	15.33
Philippa gets impatient in organising the company's Millennium Meal, but riots in the city centre prevent her from attending. Jean's husband arrives, seemingly wanting to reconcile, but it turns out he just wants a wallpaper table; Jean later goes home with Stan. Tony and Bren are trying to settle into their relationship, but the discovery of a baby on the fire escape leaves Bren feeling miserable, particularly when she discovers a note asking her to look after it. The dinnerladies discuss who the mother could be and eventually decide Twinkle is most likely. Just before midnight, however, Anita returns in tears to reclaim her son. Guest stars: Kaleem Janjua as Reg, Peter Lorenzelli as Keith, Tej Patel as Baby
14	8	"Christine"	Geoff Posner	Victoria Wood	Monday 10 January 2000; Into Friday 14 January 2000	13 January 2000	12.46
With Anita away on maternity leave, new girl Christine (Kay Adshead) joins the team. While Dolly is very taken with her, Christine's backhanded compliments and paranormal beliefs, combined with her dreadful personal hygiene and flatulence problem, leave her very unpopular with the others, especially Stan. After a mixup involving Viagra and mugs of tea, Dolly turns against Christine, who flees the canteen in tears. Meanwhile, Bren stands up to a social worker over Petula's living arrangements, Norman develops a fear of bread, and Stan worries about his sexual prowess with Jean. Guest stars: Kay Adshead as Christine, Sue Cleaver as Glenda, Adrian Hood as Norman, Lynn Whitehead as Mrs. Holcombe
15	9	"Gravy"	Geoff Posner	Victoria Wood	Monday 7 February 2000	20 January 2000	11.40
All the staff are moving on in their lives. Tony and Bren consider moving to Scotland, while Twinkle applies to become a lap dancer and Dolly makes plans to move to Mobberley. The new self-clear system proves difficult to maintain, and Petula arrives in an ambulance and announces she has only three weeks left to live. Tony finally tells Bren he loves her. They start making financial calculations for their move and quickly realise they do not have enough money. Bren discovers that she has been accepted as a contestant on the quiz show Totally Trivial (hosted by Henry Kelly) where she could win the money after Jean applied on her behalf. On the show, Bren gets through to the final round and is invited to come back to play for the grand prize. Guest stars: Henry Kelly as TV Presenter, David Hatton as Ken, Adrian Hood as Norman, Francis Lee as Brian, Katharine Page as Betty, and Julie Walters as Petula
16	10	"Toast"	Geoff Posner	Victoria Wood	Tuesday 29 February 2000	27 January 2000	13.02
Bren leaves the canteen for the Totally Trivial studios (after being given various drugs to help her relax) and plans to stop at the hospital to visit her mother on the way. The remaining staff tune in to watch Bren, but she does not appear on the show. Bren arrives with a large rubbish bag and a video cassette and tells them that Petula died while she was visiting. They watch her video will in which Petula reveals that there is money in the bag. Dolly is horrified as she has thrown it away, and Stan says the skip lorry will have already taken it. Philippa reveals that the canteen will be closing, and the staff will lose their jobs; they discuss their plans to move on. They hear the lorry arrive and Stan realises the unreliable watch Jean gave him had the wrong time. They retrieve the bag, which contains tens of thousands of pounds, which Bren gives out to the rest of the gang. Guest stars: Henry Kelly as TV Presenter, Sue Cleaver as Glenda, Sue Devaney as Jane, Adrian Hood as Norman, and Julie Walters as Petula

== Ratings ==
dinnerladies : UK viewers per episode (millions)

Season	Episode number										Average
Season	1	2	3	4	5	6	7	8	9	10	Average
1	12.24	10.59	9.46	9.53	8.85	9.43	–				10.02
2	13.86	13.41	13.64	13.20	9.35	9.20	15.33	12.46	11.40	13.02	12.49

Audience measurement performed by Broadcasters' Audience Research Board
