= Orient Express (BBC Radio Merseyside) =

Orient Express is a long-running weekly programme for the Chinese community of Merseyside, broadcast on BBC Radio Merseyside.

The show is presented by June Yee and Billy Hui BEM. Yee started her broadcasting career at BBC Radio Merseyside in 1988, alongside Lawrence Ma and Mary Ng. She took on various roles including the production and planning of five-minute news bulletins, before becoming a presenter.

In 2014, June and Billy took part in a special broadcast for the BBC based on the Chinese Community, at Liverpool's History Museum.

The weekly edition of 'Orient Express', currently airs on Monday evenings on BBC Radio Merseyside.
