= Billy Butler (DJ) =

British radio presenter (born 1942)

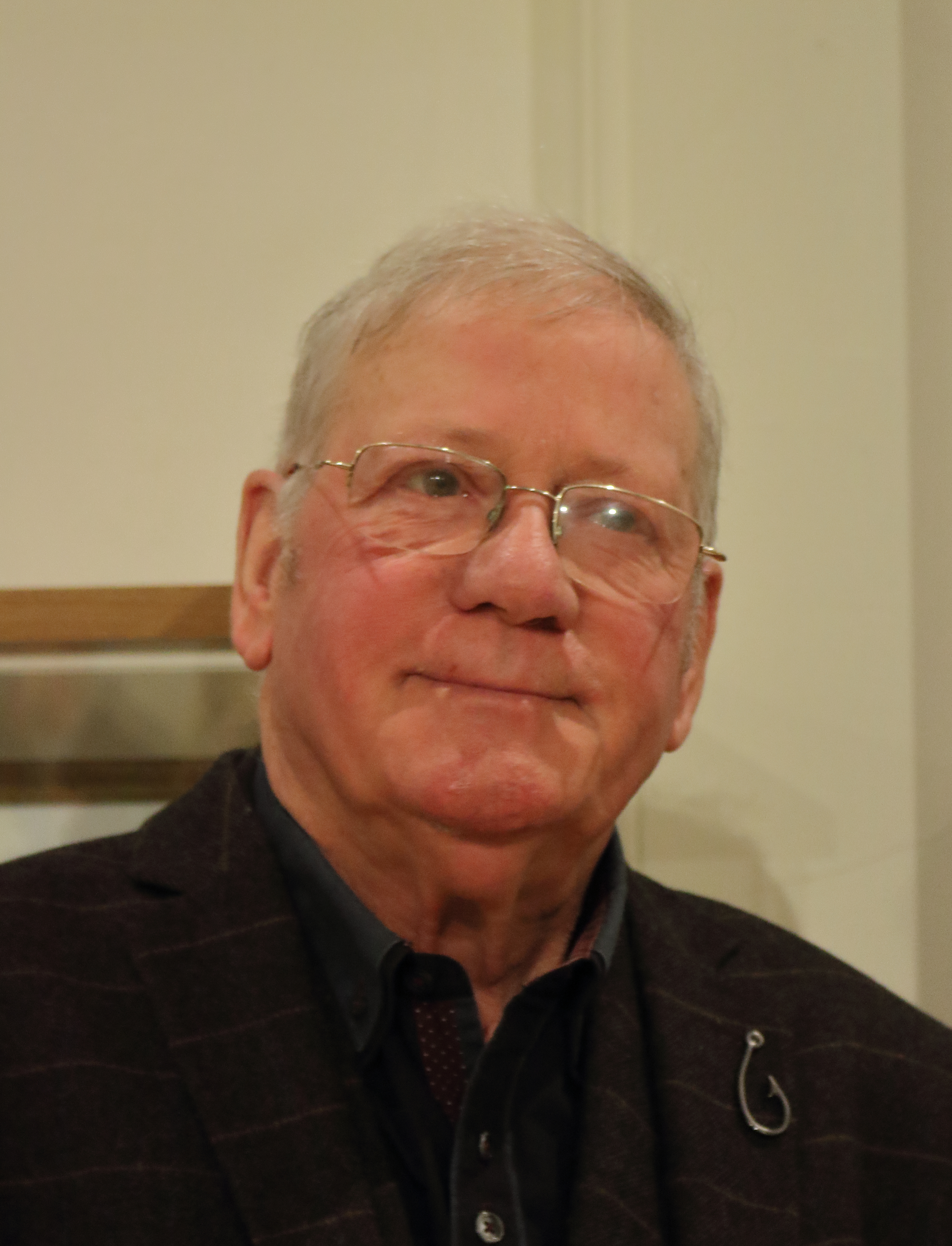
- Butler at an event in Liverpool in 2018
- Born: William George Butler; 24 January 1942 (age 84); Amlwch, Anglesey, Wales
- Occupation: Radio presenter
- Years active: 1960s to present
- Employer: Liverpool Live Radio (2020-Present) BBC Radio Merseyside (1971–2018)

William George Butler (born 24 January 1942) is a British radio presenter on Liverpool Live Radio and formerly BBC Radio Merseyside and Radio City who was born in Amlwch, Anglesey in Wales.

In the 1960s, he was a DJ at the Cavern Club in Liverpool and was also a member of the Liverpool band The Tuxedos. In the early 60s, he came to national attention in the Spin-A-Disc panel on the ITV programme, Thank Your Lucky Stars, and he recorded a single with Polly Perkins, "I Reckon You". Billy made guest appearances with The Merseybeats and he formed his own group, the Tuxedos.

In the course of his career, he has presented TV shows such as FAX and the magazine programme What the Butler Sees.

During the summer of 1979 he was the co-host of Saturday morning children's TV show The Mersey Pirate, based on the ferry MV Royal Iris. In 1987, Butler appeared in the first two series of ChuckleVision in a segment called "Armchair Theatre", where he would tell a story to the viewers.

From 1988 to 1990 he presented a seasonal late Friday night show on BBC Radio 2 in the early months of the year.

He appeared in 'Scousers in St Helens' on 26 October 2010 alongside Tina Malone, Margi Clarke and many others.

In September 2010 he published his autobiography Billy Butler MBE – Mrs Butler’s Eldest.

In 2018, Butler's contract with BBC Radio Merseyside was not renewed. He now presents a Saturday and Sunday radio programme on Liverpool Live Radio.

== Radio City ==
After several years at Radio City, Billy left when he played Cliff Richard's Can't Keep This Feeling In twice during a breakfast show on sister station Magic 1548 and saying this was what the listeners asked for, but the station playlist would not allow him to play it, so he walked out while live on air.

== Hold Your Plums ==
Hold Your Plums was a radio quiz show which ran for over a decade on BBC Radio Merseyside. It was hosted by Billy Butler and the late Wally Scott.

Hold Your Plums started out as a segment of Billy Butler’s radio show and was extended to a two-hour show of its own. It was broadcast live from the BBC Radio Merseyside Studio’s on Paradise Street, Liverpool on Sundays from 11 am to 1 pm, using Root Beer Rag composed by Billy Joel as its regular catchy theme tune. Mostly an audience was present in the studio as the show went out.

Wally Scott died after a long illness in April 2024.

== Awards ==
In 1998 Billy Butler and Wally Scott won a Sony Bronze Comedy Award for the Hold Your Plums Christmas Special.

in 2010 Billy Butler received an Outstanding Contribution award from the BBC in the Gillard Awards. The Frank Gillard awards were set up in 2000 honouring achievement in BBC local radio.

In 2013 Billy Butler won the Lifetime Achievement Award at the Liverpool Music Awards.

In 2018 Billy Butler was enrolled as a Citizen of Honour of Liverpool. This honour was introduced by Liverpool City Council to formally recognise individuals who have made a significant, exceptional or unique contribution to enriching the life of the City of Liverpool and is the highest accolade the City can bestow upon a person.

Billy Butler has been awarded a total of five Scouseology awards. The Scouseology awards were created in 1988 to salute those Merseysiders who have contributed to local life and gained national recognition in the process.
