= The Mersey Pirate =

1979 British children's TV series

- Genre: Children's
- Presented by: Duggie Brown; Frank Carson; Bernard Wrigley; Billy Butler
- Country of origin: United Kingdom
- Original language: English

Production
- Production company: Granada Television

Original release
- Network: ITV
- Release: 2 June – 4 August 1979

The Mersey Pirate is a British children's television programme that was shown in 1979. Based aboard a Mersey ferry, the Royal Iris, anchored at Liverpool Docks in the River Mersey, it was produced by Granada Television and was introduced to fill the Saturday morning summer break taken by Tiswas.

The programme's presenter was Duggie Brown and guests included Frank Carson, Bernard Wrigley and Billy Butler. Actors Andrew Schofield and Ray Kingsley, who would later work together on the television series Scully, played stowaways. Various guests appeared on the series including The Dooleys, Bad Manners, The Undertones, and Star Wars star David Prowse (who was equally known in the UK for his persona as The Green Cross Code Man at the time).

Most ITV regions showed the programme, though several (including Tyne Tees, UTV and Channel Television) did not. The show had been due to run throughout the summer of 1979, but its run was cut short due to the ITV network strike that ran from August to October that year.

The following year another Granada production, Fun Factory, took the Summer Saturday morning slot.
