= Roger Hill =

Roger Hill may refer to:

== Politicians ==
- Roger Hill (died 1608) (1545–1608), MP for Taunton and Plympton Erle
- Roger Hill (judge) (1605–1667), English judge and Member of Parliament
- Roger Hill (of Denham) (1642–1729), son of Roger Hill (judge), MP for Wendover

== Others ==
- Roger P. Hill (1910–2001), Royal Navy officer; commander of various destroyers
- Roger Hill (actor) (1948–2014), American actor
- Roger Hill (broadcaster), British radio presenter, producer and arts director
- Roger Hill (speedway rider), English motorcycle speedway rider
- Buck Hill (musician) (born Roger Hill, 1927–2017), American jazz saxophonist
