= MV Royal Iris =

Twin screw, diesel-electric ferry

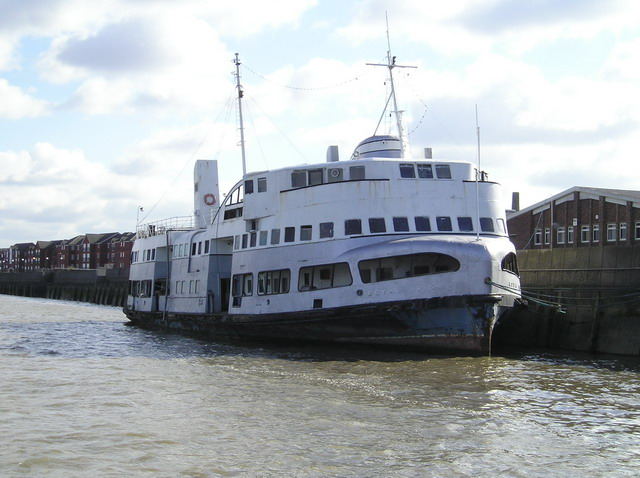
- Royal Iris on the Thames in 2009

History
- Name: 1950 onwards: Royal Iris
- Owner: James Jegede
- Operator: 1950–1969: Wallasey Corporation; 1969–1990: Merseytravel; 1990–1991: Mersey Ferries; 1991–present: laid up
- Port of registry: 1950–present: Liverpool
- Builder: William Denny and Brothers, Dumbarton
- Yard number: 1448
- Launched: 8 December 1950
- Maiden voyage: May 1951
- Out of service: 12 January 1991
- Identification: IMO number: 5301332
- Status: Derelict

General characteristics
- Tonnage: 1,234 GT
- Length: 48.46 m (159 ft 0 in)
- Beam: 14.63 m (48 ft 0 in)
- Draught: 2.74 m (9 ft 0 in)
- Installed power: 4 x Ruston & Hornsby diesel engines
- Propulsion: 2 × Metropolitan-Vickers electric motors; 2 × controllable pitch propellers
- Speed: 12 knots (22 km/h; 14 mph)

MV Royal Iris is a twin screw, diesel-electric, Mersey Ferry. The vessel was built by William Denny & Brothers of Dumbarton (Yard No. 1448) and launched in December 1950, costing £256,000. She was the third Mersey ferry to carry the 'Royal Iris' name.

The engines were produced by Ruston & Hornsby Metropolitan-Vickers. Propulsion: 4 oil 4SA, each six cylinders driving four generators, each 300 kW/300v DC-connected to two electric motors, each 730shp and 2 shafts. The maximum speed is 12 knots. The ship measured 1,234 GT. Length is 159 feet long and 48 feet wide, with a draught of 9 feet. At least during the first decade of its life, the ship's diesel-electric propulsion made her more economical to run than the other vessels in the fleet.

Since 2002, the vessel has been laid up in a berth on the River Thames, close to the Thames Barrier in Woolwich. As of 2022, the ship continues to sit derelict and half submerged at its moorings and by 2025, her interior had been gutted by fire.

== Career in service ==
Royal Iris ran the trials on the Skelmorlie Mile on the River Clyde on 24 April 1951. Arriving in the River Mersey on 28 April 1951, she was initially owned and operated by Wallasey Corporation and carried the borough coat of arms on the front of the superstructure. Upon entering service on 5 May 1951, she was licensed to carry 2,296 passengers on normal ferry duties, or 1,000 for cruising. Originally painted in a green and cream livery, the ship was distinctive in having a forward dummy funnel near the bridge and two exhaust stacks amidships, on both sides. Onboard amenities included a dancefloor and stage, tea room, buffet, cocktail bar, even a fish and chip saloon. The latter likely affording Royal Iris the nickname "the fish and chip boat".

On 7 September 1951 the battleship HMS Duke of York was under tow on way to being broken up at Gareloch when she collided with Royal Iris off Gladstone Dock. Royal Iris was temporarily out of control and the floodtide carried her against the warship. The ferry was approaching the end of a cruise organised by the Amalgamated Engineering Union. Some people were hospitalised as a result of the accident.

During the 1960s numerous acts associated with the Merseybeat scene performed on the ferry. Duke Duval played on the first Cavern Cruise, followed by The Beatles and Gerry & The Pacemakers. Paul McCartney referenced performing with the Beatles on the ferry in his song "That Was Me"

The vessel is also the subject of a 1963 painting by LS Lowry. The painting entitled Royal Iris features the vessel in its original beige and green livery sailing against the backdrop of the Liverpool skyline. In 2022 it was placed on long term loan to the Walker Art Gallery and is currently on display.

== Later years ==
Royal Iris transferred to the combined fleet of the newly formed Merseyside Passenger Transport Executive on 1 December 1969, which consisted of seven vessels.

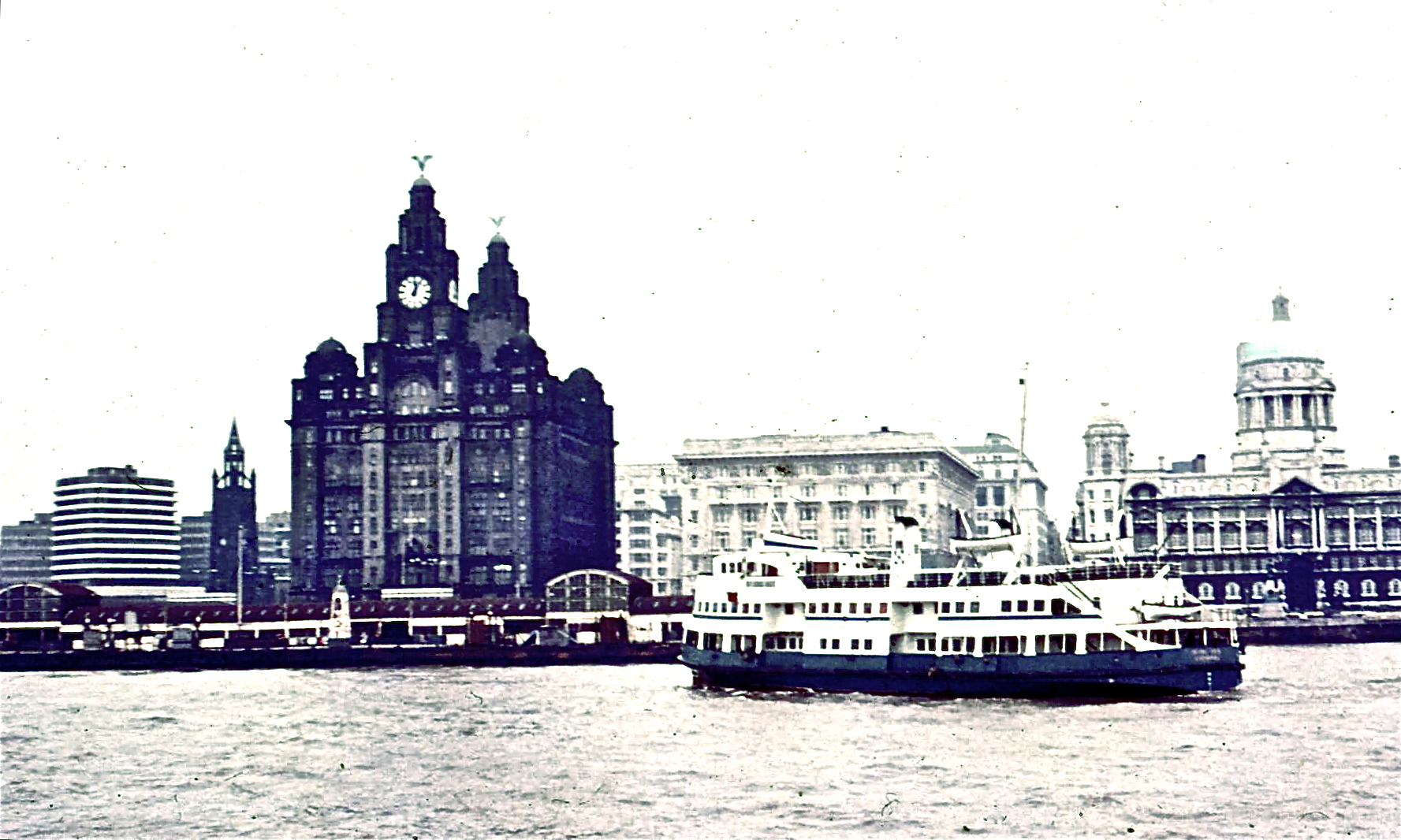
1972 approaching Princes Landing Stage, Liverpool

Despite an ongoing financial debt against Royal Iris from when she was built, capital was made available to refit at the Harland and Wolff in Bootle in 1971-72. Sporting a new blue and white livery, she was subsequently used, almost exclusively, as a cruise vessel. A sum of £68,000 was also provided for a new steak bar and dining area, replacing the original fish and chip saloon. Up until this refit, she had carried two side slung lifeboats on davits which were removed leaving just a single lifeboat slung from the stern.

Whilst docked for the annual survey on 12 January 1975, a fire broke out in the engine room, causing extensive electrical damage.

On 21 June 1977, Royal Iris carried Queen Elizabeth II and the Duke of Edinburgh on their Silver Jubilee Mersey Review.

The ship was used by Granada Television during the summer of 1980 as the setting for the ITV Saturday morning children's television series The Mersey Pirate. For this purpose, a dome structure was built on the promenade deck of the vessel.

During 1984 Royal Iris and the other three Mersey Ferries received the red, white and blue livery to mark the 1984 International Garden Festival at Otterspool. In April and May 1985 the vessel left Liverpool Bay for the first time since the delivery from Scotland. She was sent on a 1500-mile round trip to London on a publicity drive for Merseyside, sailing around Land's End, up the River Thames and under Tower Bridge, docking adjacent to HMS Belfast.

== Decline, withdrawal and a new beginning in Liverpool ==
During the early 1990s, funding was found to allow Mountwood, Woodchurch and Overchurch an extensive refurbishment, which included provision for cruising duties. The ageing Royal Iris, the last ex-Wallasey vessel, was considered surplus to requirements because of the cost of bringing her up to modern standards after a major survey. Over the passing years the boat had become noticeably slower and expensive to maintain.

Royal Iris ran a farewell evening cruise on 12 January 1991, prior to being taken out of service and laid up awaiting confirmation of its fate. On 21 April 1991, the boat was granted a one-day licence from the Department of Transport to carry 600 people on a cruise to mark the 73rd Anniversary of the Zeebrugge Raid of 1918. On 16 August 1991, she was placed in the hands of shipbrokers SC Chambers Limited of Liverpool for an asking price of £100,000.

In November 1991, she was sold to a consortium for conversion into a floating nightclub, restaurant and conference centre, based in Liverpool under the name of 'Mr Smith's Nightclub'. She was delivered to the Stanley Dock complex in early 1992 to begin a new life on Merseyside and was subsequently painted Bright Blue with a red band around the top deck windows.

== Leaving of Liverpool ==
On 7 August 1993, the Liverpool Echo carried front page news that Royal Iris had been sold to Hertfordshire-based Parkway Leisure who had the intention of turning her into a floating nightspot in Cardiff, spending £300,000 on refurbishments. On 10 August 1993, the Royal Iris was removed from Stanley Dock. In a two-hour operation she broke free from the tow line and smashed into the dock wall twice. Royal Iris finally left the River Mersey for the last time, under tow, on the morning of 12 August 1993, after being towed to the Pier Head for a final goodbye.

On 10 August 1994, it was reported that Cardiff Council had rejected a planning proposal for the use of the vessel. No work had been carried out on the vessel in the preceding 12 months and berthing charges had not been paid. A spokesman for the new owners, Parkway Leisure, reported that they were 'open to offers'.

In January 1996, it was reported that a business consortium from Liverpool was in talks to bring Royal Iris back to the Mersey and make her seaworthy again. The consortium was considering applying for National Lottery funding and launching a £1-a-head public subscription fundraising campaign. This venture ultimately did not come to fruition.

== The move to London ==
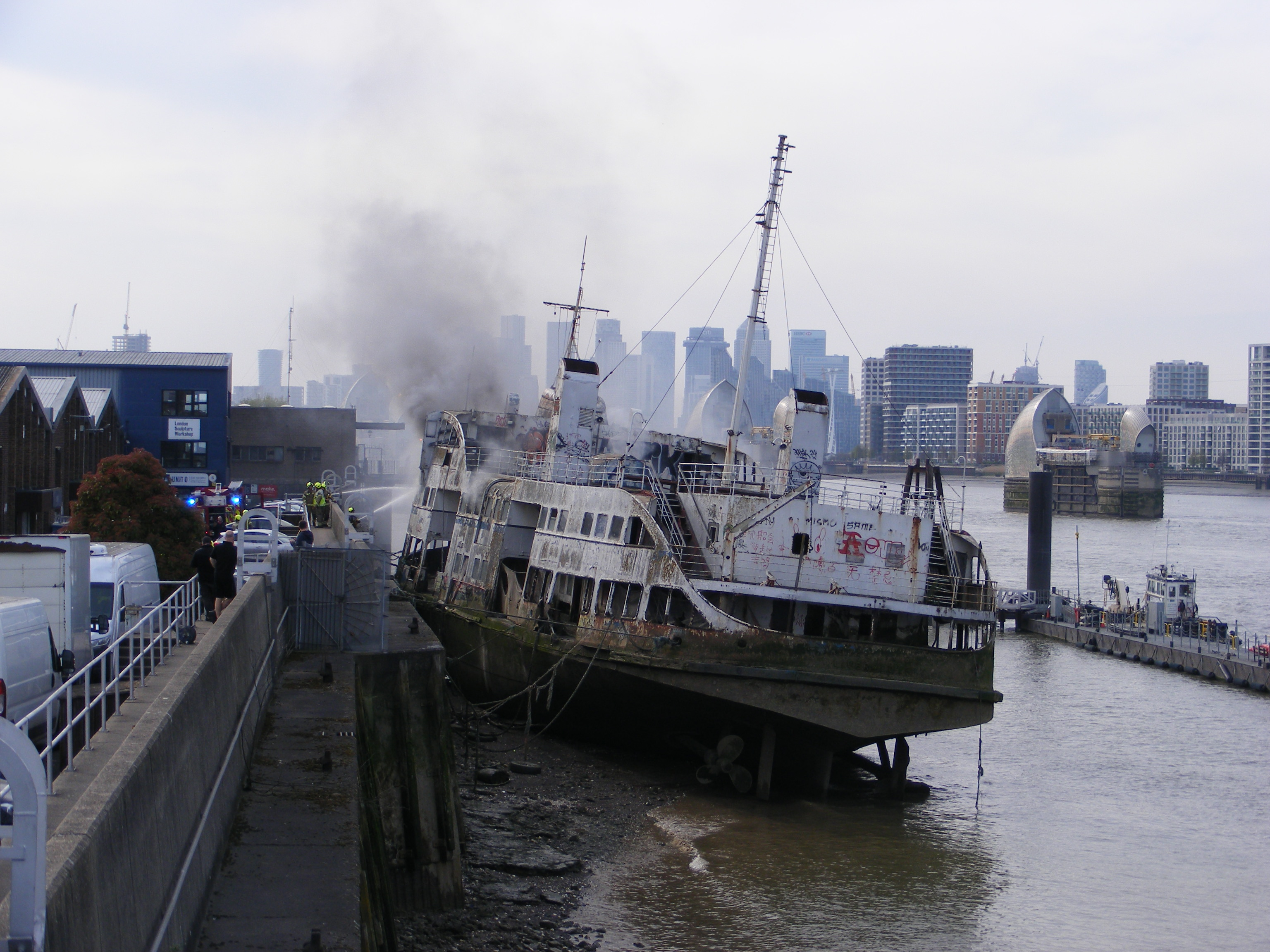
Royal Iris on fire in April 2025

In 2002 the vessel was towed to a berth on the River Thames near Woolwich, awaiting a possible refit as a floating nightclub.

On 6 February 2010, it was reported that Police and the RNLI had been called out to the berth on the River Thames, near Woolwich, after a passing vessel noticed she had taken on water up to the passenger deck. It was unclear how long she had been in this state. There was evidence found to suggest that squatters had been living on board. Also found on board were various items of drug paraphernalia.

On the 9th April 2025, it was reported that a fire had broken out, gutting most of her remaining interior

== The campaign to return to Merseyside ==
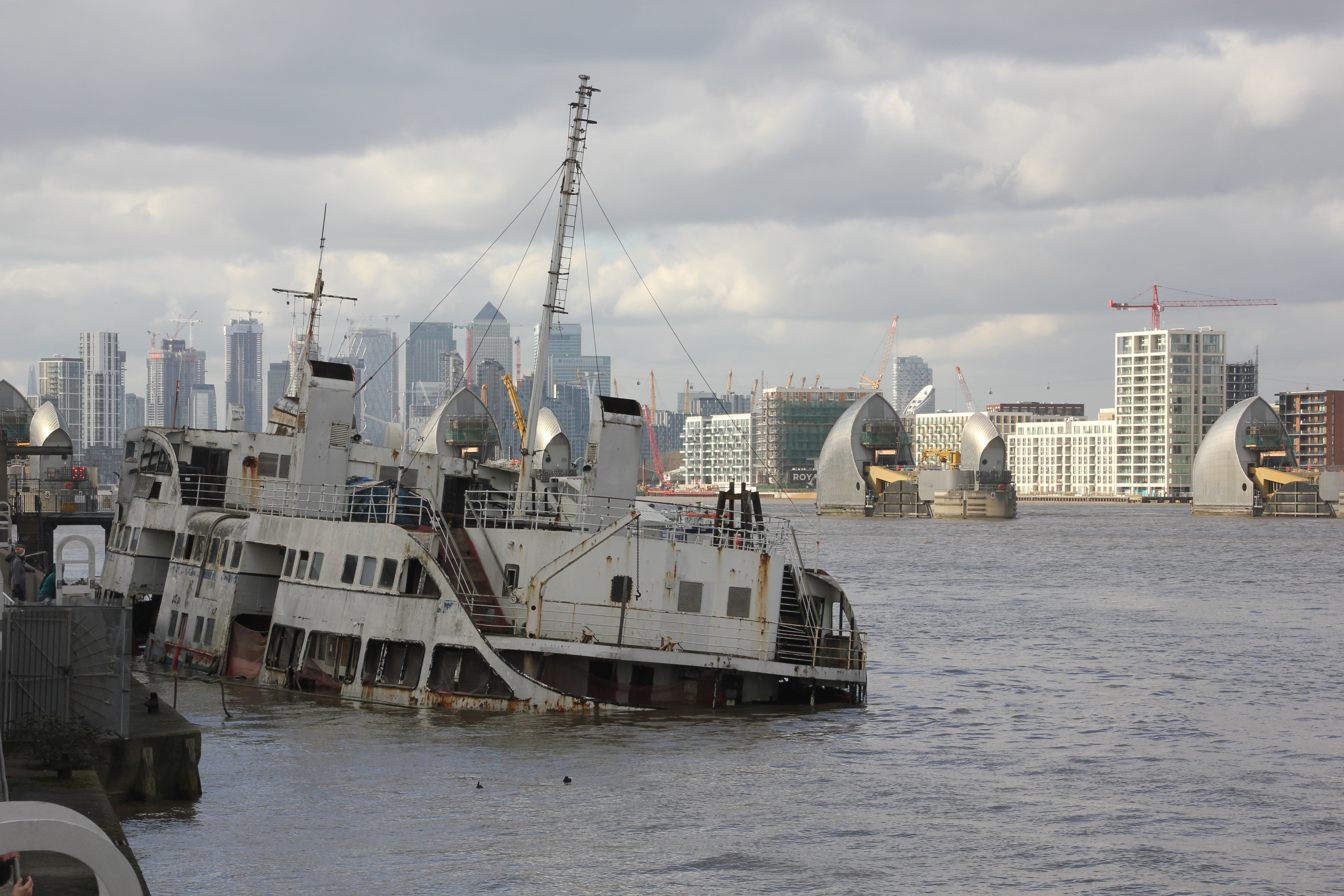
MV Royal Iris taking in water, east of Thames Barrier in London (February 2019).

On 20 February 2010, the Liverpool Echo carried an article about an unnamed Wirral businessman who wished to purchase her. On 4 March 2010, the Liverpool Echo carried an article about an online petition to have her returned to Merseyside, and on 9 March 2010, James Jegede, the current owner of Royal Iris, spoke to BBC Radio Merseyside about his plans.

In 2014, Royal Iris was still settled on the mudbank with a hole in her lower side. The cost of taking the vessel back to Merseyside was estimated to be a significant six figure sum, and, according to a local Member of Parliament, was unlikely to go ahead.

In July 2020, the Royal Iris was seen in background of Tony Robinson's programme Britain's Greatest River during delivery of Selina tunnelling boring machine to Chambers Wharf.

== Gallery ==
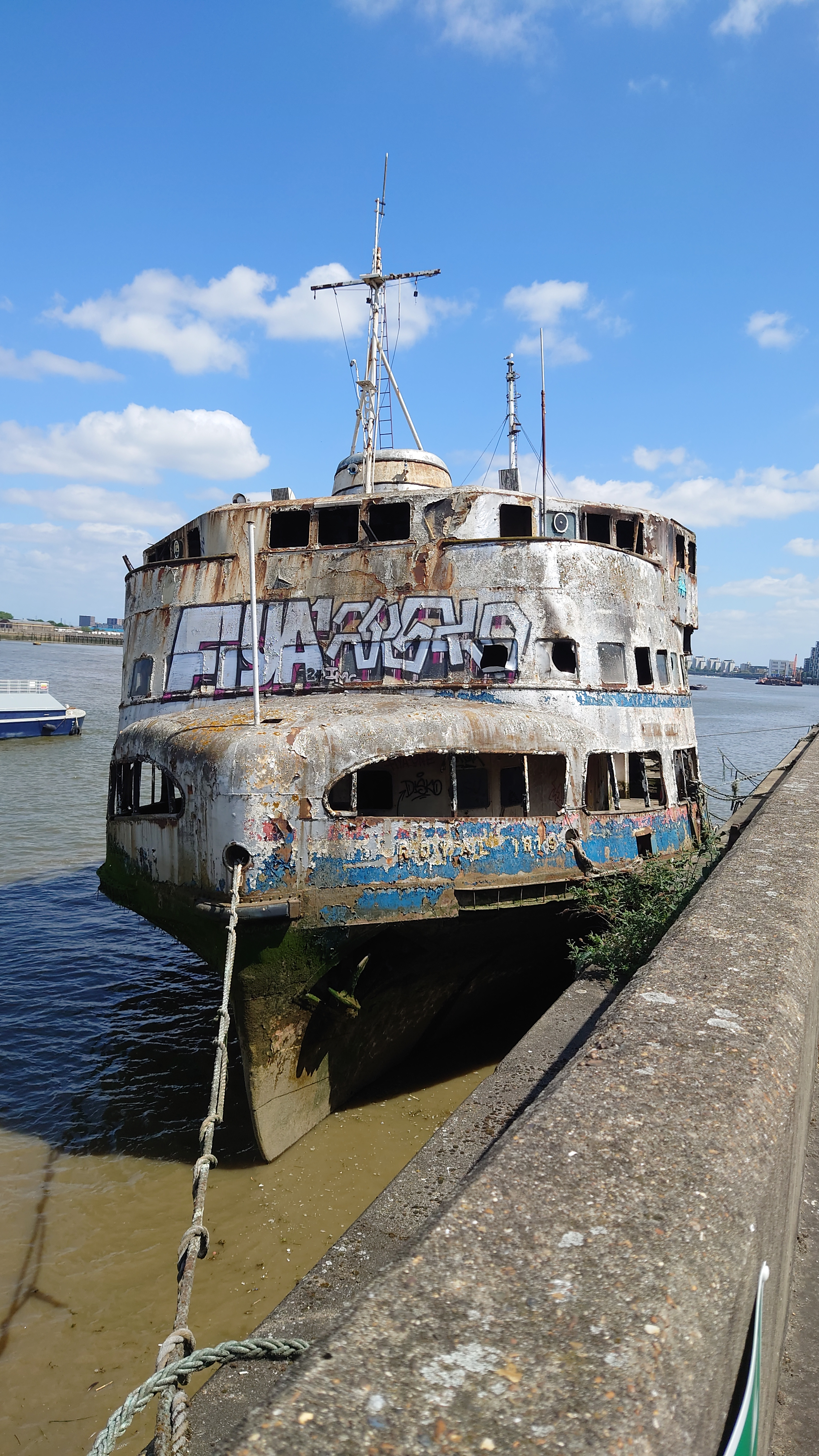
MV Royal Iris was gutted by fire in April 2025, following three decades of neglect.

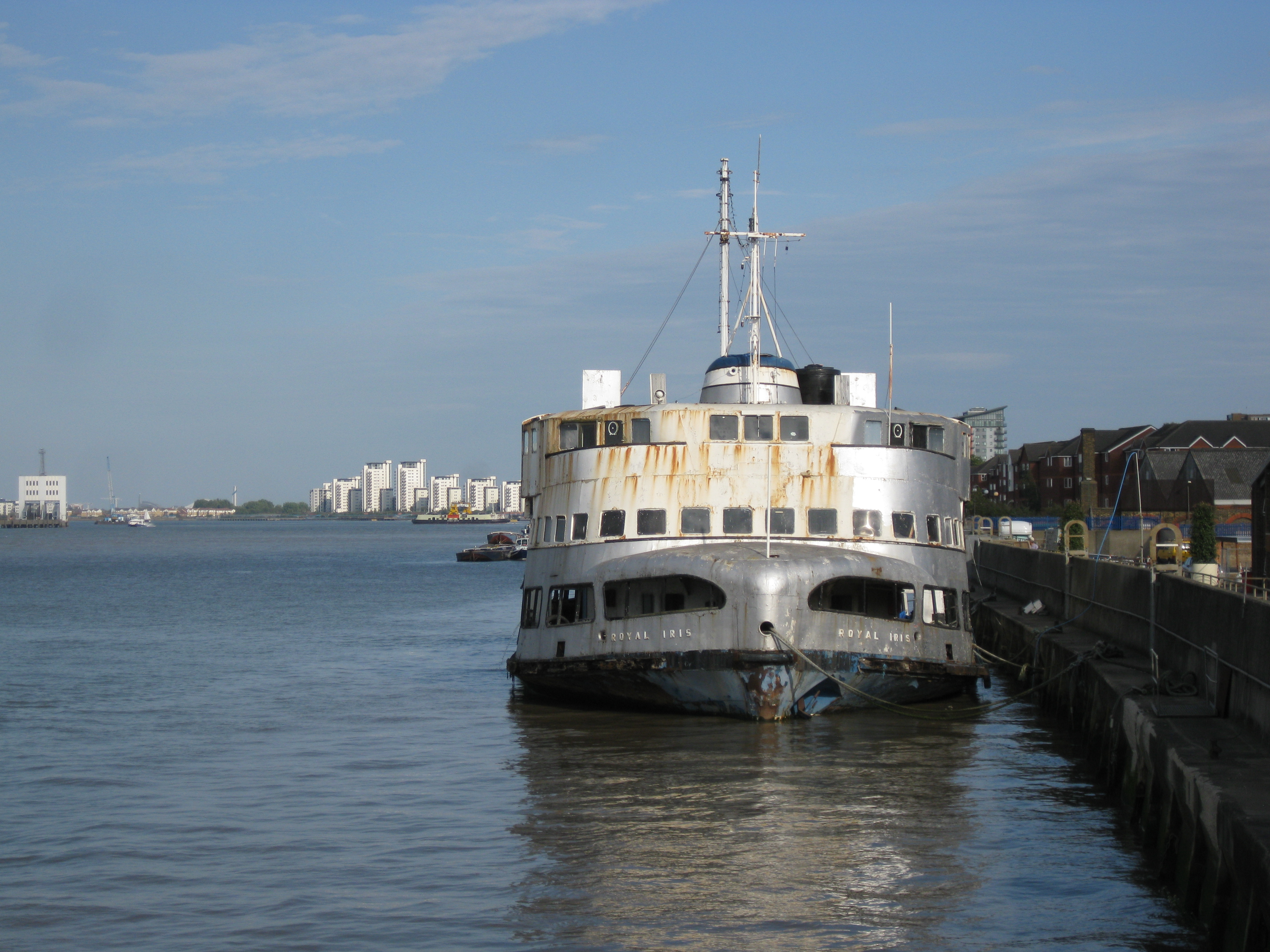
Royal Iris at Woolwich

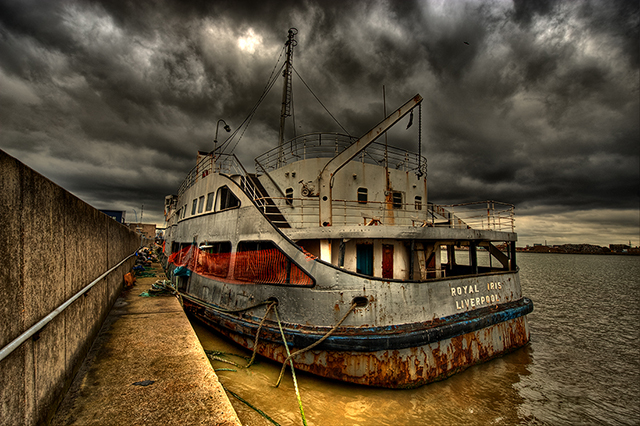
The Royal Iris on the Thames

== See also ==
- List of ships built by William Denny and Brothers
