= Dinnerladies (TV series) =

British TV sitcom (1998–2000)

dinnerladies
- The title card from the first episode, showing the canteen in which the show is set
- Also known as: dinnerladies
- Genre: Sitcom
- Created by: Victoria Wood
- Written by: Victoria Wood
- Directed by: Geoff Posner
- Starring: Victoria Wood; Thelma Barlow; Andrew Dunn; Shobna Gulati; Celia Imrie; Maxine Peake; Duncan Preston; Anne Reid; Julie Walters
- Theme music composer: Victoria Wood
- Country of origin: United Kingdom
- Original language: English
- No. of series: 2
- No. of episodes: 16 (list of episodes)

Production
- Executive producers: Philip McIntyre; David Tyler
- Producers: Geoff Posner; Victoria Wood
- Production location: BBC Television Centre
- Camera setup: Multiple-camera setup
- Running time: 27–34 minutes
- Production companies: Good Fun; Pozzitive Television

Original release
- Network: BBC One
- Release: 12 November 1998 – 27 January 2000

Dinnerladies (stylised as dinnerladies) is a British television sitcom created, written and co-produced by Victoria Wood. Two series were broadcast on BBC One from 1998 to 2000, with sixteen episodes in total. The programme is repeated on Gold, and Drama. The complete series was released on DVD in November 2004.

The series is set almost entirely in the canteen of HWD Components, a fictional factory in Manchester, featuring the caterers and regular customers as the main characters. It depicts the lives and social and romantic interactions of the staff, and is centred around the main character of Brenda Furlong, played by Wood.

== Plot ==
The beginning of the first series introduces the characters, a group of mostly female and middle-aged canteen workers at a factory in Manchester. The main character is the kind and dependable Brenda "Bren" Furlong, whose relationship with sarcastic and exhausted canteen manager Tony Martin (Andrew Dunn) develops through the show.

The characters feature the prim and prudish Dolly Bellfield (Thelma Barlow) and her waspish friend Jean (Anne Reid), and the younger and snarky Twinkle (Maxine Peake), who is always late, and the scatter-brained but mild-mannered Anita (Shobna Gulati).

Stan Meadowcroft (Duncan Preston) is an opinionated and easily provoked, but well-meaning, maintenance man who is responsible for cleaning the factory and fixing equipment. The new cheery but disorganised human resources manager Philippa Moorcroft (Celia Imrie) is from the South and does not initially fit in well with the rest of the staff; she moved to Manchester because of her relationship with senior staff member Mr Michael (Christopher Greet).

Actress Julie Walters also appears in nine episodes (Note: "Monday", "Scandal", "Moods", "Party", "Trouble", "Holidays", "Christmas", "Gravy" and "Toast") as Bren's down-and-out, delusional and manipulative mother, who lives in a caravan behind a petrol station. She abandoned Bren at an orphanage, and often turns up to ask for favours.

In the first series, Bren and Tony's relationship begins to develop, and she supports him as he undergoes chemotherapy. Philippa tries to organise team-building activities, the factory receives a royal visit, Bren's mother causes a scandal in the factory, the team bring their mothers to work, HWD Components merges with a Japanese company and Tony is temporarily replaced by Nicola Bodeux due to his treatment. Bodeux resigns after causing the canteen staff to strike, leading Bren to take charge on an interim basis amidst a crisis for the company.

Throughout the second series, Bren and Tony's relationship develops further; the canteen takes on a work experience girl named Sigourney (Joanne Froggatt), Jean goes to stay with her sister after she is put in a foul mood by her unfaithful husband, a prisoner escapes from a local prison and Bren's fear of needles is mistaken for pregnancy. Jane (Sue Devaney) organises a holiday to Marbella, on which Bren and Tony want to go together. After a mix-up, Bren manages to get a place, but she ends up giving the money to her mother instead. Their colleagues bet on when Bren and Tony will "get it on", and they finally get together after Tony puts on a surprise birthday party for Bren, who was born on Christmas Eve.

Later in the series, Philippa cannot attend the Millennium meal she organises, and Anita has a baby; after leaving it anonymously for Bren to care for, she takes it back and goes on parental leave; she is replaced temporarily by Christine (Kay Adshead), who is disliked by the rest of the dinner ladies.

As the closure of the canteen looms, the staff plan to move on with their lives. Bren goes on a game show, but loses her chance to win after she cannot attend due to her mother's death. It is revealed that her mother left her a large amount of money, which Bren and Tony use to move to Scotland.

== Series ==
Series	Episodes	Originally released	
Series	Episodes	First released	Last released
1	6	12 November 1998	17 December 1998
2	10	25 November 1999	27 January 2000

== Characters ==
=== Main ===
- Victoria Wood as Brenda "Bren" Furlong

Bren is the deputy manager of the canteen, and arguably the most reasonable of the characters. She had an unhappy childhood as her mother had her taken into foster care, and she later married an alcoholic named Martin of whom she was afraid. She is very good at solving her colleagues' problems but often doubts her ability to overcome her own hardships and has low self-esteem. She has a very quick mind, often scrambling for adjectives and making unintentional malapropisms. She has a near-encyclopaedic knowledge of film, which she makes many metaphorical references to, and gets as her subject on the quiz show Totally Trivial. Several times in the first series it is hinted that she has feelings for Tony, though nothing comes of this until halfway through the second series. At the end of the final episode, she and Tony make plans to move to Scotland.

- Andrew Dunn as Tony Martin

The divorced canteen manager, whose battle against cancer is a running storyline in the first series, prompting him to want to do more with his life than running a canteen in the second. He is mildly frustrated when the staff are not working, and tends to come out with sarcastic remarks. Though he talks and thinks about women a lot, he has very little luck with them. He is attracted to Bren, but is too shy to reveal this to her for a long time. He is also a smoker and uses his need for a cigarette as an excuse to escape uncomfortable or surreal situations.

- Thelma Barlow as Dolly Bellfield

Something of a social climber, Dolly is the cattiest of the dinner ladies, often making bitchy remarks about others. Prim and prudish, she previously worked at the upmarket Café Bonbon. She frequently snaps at people for using bad language and frowns on the sexual shenanigans of Twinkle, whom she is convinced did not have to work for her catering qualification. Overtly conservative, she believes everything she reads in the Daily Mail without question, often quoting the articles she has read, and is prone to making remarks of dubious political correctness. She is fixated on her weight and dieting, although she is tempted to snack on Mars bars in stressful situations and it is revealed in several episodes that she was formerly obese. She has been married for thirty years to her husband Bob (Jack Smethurst), with whom she has a son named Stephen; it is implied that Stephen is in a homosexual relationship with his university roommate, Marcus, although this is a topic of embarrassment to Dolly, who seems to have reluctantly acknowledged the situation without truly accepting it. She hopes to move to the nearby upmarket village of Mobberley after her retirement.

- Anne Reid as Jean

Dolly's best friend, Jean is very often the stooge for her mordant remarks. She has a somewhat bawdy sense of humour and is long-sighted, but refuses to wear her glasses, so often misinterprets headlines when reading newspapers or magazines. She is unhappily married to her husband Keith (Peter Lorenzelli) at the start of the series, with grown-up daughter Lisa (Jane Hazlegrove), but in series two he leaves her for a Welsh dental hygienist named Bronwyn. After getting over the shock, which leaves her so depressed and irritable that her sister Peggy (Linda Bassett) is called in to take her to Tunstall to recuperate, Jean rediscovers her self-confidence and has a fling with security guard Barry (Howard Crossley), "the love muscle", before settling down in a more solid relationship with Stan. She accepts his proposal in the final episode, and reveals that she has been asked to stay on at HWD Components to run the snack bar replacing the canteen.

- Maxine Peake as Twinkle

The youngest member of the team, she frequently turns up late for work and tries unsuccessfully to scrounge cigarettes from Tony. Despite her snarky attitude, she regards the other members of staff as friends, particularly Bren, to whom she turns for help on several occasions, such as when she thinks she is pregnant. She lives with her disabled mother Bev (Jackie Downey), for whom she acts as carer, and often spends her evenings getting drunk and falling into skips. Something of a recalcitrant delinquent who often skipped school, she speaks with a heavy Manc accent and is also a closeted football fan.

- Shobna Gulati as Anita

Pleasant, but rather dim and forgetful, Anita is a kind and loyal friend to her colleagues, empathising with them and often helping them to solve their problems without even realising it. She is somewhat desperate to have a family and children, becoming pregnant in the second series after a one-night stand with a visiting decorator (Kevin Maxwell) and, terrified of the implications, leaves the baby on the fire escape on Millennium Eve, attaching a note asking Bren to look after him. However, she quickly returns to take the baby back. She is a big fan of Celine Dion and is of a South Asian background.

- Duncan Preston as Stan Meadowcroft

One of the factory's maintenance men, Stan lives with his father Jim (Eric Sykes), a retired Desert Rat soldier of whom he often speaks. In the episode "moods", Stan reveals that his mother ran off with a piano tuner in 1954, which his father never recovered from. He is particularly close to Bren as she seems to be the only one who knows how to successfully handle his changeable moods. After his father's death he decides to get his life going again, embarking on a brief relationship with a nurse called Bobbi (Tina Malone) before dating, and ultimately proposing to, his colleague Jean, who accepts him in the final episode. Although he is well-meaning, Stan's behaviour can occasionally verge on being chauvinistic, believing that he should perform physical labour. This stems from his belief that such tasks (among others, such as seeing animal carcasses) are not suitable for, as he puts it, "female women".

- Celia Imrie as Philippa Moorcroft

The scatty and disorganised manager of the Human Resources department, having apparently landed the job because she was in a relationship with the factory manager, Mr Michael, who she refers to as Mikey. Her well-meaning attempts to relieve the dinner ladies' stress or help them in their personal lives generally have the opposite effect: in the first episode, she tries to organise Scottish country dancing sessions. In the second series she decides to break up with Mr Michael, and later begins a relationship with a colleague, Tom Murray (Mark Drewry). Philippa is the only character in the series who comes from the south of England.

- Julie Walters as Petula Gordeno

Bren's selfish, manipulative, and delusional mother, who had Bren taken into foster care as a child because she was "cramping her style", and claims that she lost the address of the orphanage. She sometimes seems to forget that Bren is her daughter, and usually turns up looking for money or a favour. She often claims to be a close friend (and usually lover) of the rich and famous, but in reality is a down-and-out who lives in a caravan behind a petrol station. (Note: Gordeno claims to have known multiple celebrities, including: Richard Clayderman, Frankie Vaughan, Mandy Rice-Davies, Art Garfunkel, David Hockney, Pat Phoenix, Cliff Richard, Catherine Deneuve, Frank Sinatra, Gerard Depardieu, Mary Hopkin, Tina Turner, Sacha Distel, Nina Simone, Lauren Bacall, Gwyneth Paltrow, Judi Dench, The Osmonds, Lauren Bacall, Roger Moore, Jane Fonda, George Michael, Leonardo DiCaprio, Kate Winslet, Billy Connolly, Miles Davis, Karen Carpenter, Henry Kissinger, John Lennon, Yoko Ono, Robert Winston, Sheena Easton, Richard E. Grant, Sophia Loren, Ken Russell, Yul Brynner, Giant Haystacks, Dusty Springfield, Cindy Crawford, several West Indies cricketers, and members of "the boxing fraternity". She also considers herself a contemporary of Haile Selassie, Andy Warhol, and Salvador Dalí.) In the first series, she has an affair with 16-year-old Clint (Kenny Doughty). In the second series, she gets involved with Reg (Kaleem Janjua), an Asian petrol station attendant, and claims to be pregnant with his child. In the final episode, she dies off-screen on 29 February 2000, after having been admitted to hospital on 7 February with three weeks to live. It is revealed that her real name was the same as Bren's; Bren muses that she "can't have hated [her] that much" if she named her after herself.

=== Recurring ===
- Sue Devaney as Jane

A member of the planning department, she had a small but significant role in the first series, usually ordering the toast round for meetings. In the second series, she played a larger role, having an ongoing wager with the canteen staff on whether Bren and Tony would "get it on" by Christmas Eve. She reportedly had a drunken snog herself with Tony whilst on holiday in Marbella. Although called 'Jane' by the other characters, the credits only name the character as 'Secretary'.

- Andrew Livingston (series 1) and Adrian Hood (series 2) as Norman

Delivers bread to the canteen. Norman is dour, work-shy, agoraphobic and "technically" a bigamist. He often attributes his agoraphobia to an incident when he "fell off a diving board in Guernsey". He also developed a fear of bread in the second series.

- Sue Cleaver as Glenda

A bread supplier who often takes over Norman's duties when his agoraphobia is plaguing him. She underwent bladder surgery, the nature of which is never directly mentioned. Tony often jokes that she is his "fantasy woman" and once claimed she bore a resemblance to the UK comic character Desperate Dan.

- Christopher Greet as Mr Michael

Senior staff member of HWD Components; it is hinted that he is a manager or even managing director. He was in a relationship with Philippa, which was the reason she moved to Manchester. He is a fan of trad jazz, jigsaws, custard and Garibaldi biscuits.

- Bernard Wrigley as Bob

A factory worker who appears at the counter in a number of episodes, usually asking for bacon or liver. He takes a mild interest in canteen gossip.

- Steve Huison as Steve Greengrass

A perennially unlucky individual considered a jinx by the rest of the factory. He was reluctantly invited on the Marbella trip by Jane, as his last three holidays were cancelled due to various unfortunate events, but he fell down a staircase after tripping on spilled orange juice Anita forgot to clean, resulting in a space being left open for Bren. Steve has to separate his food before eating it, an eccentricity that only adds to his alienation from his co-workers.

- Kate Robbins as Babs

A friend of Petula's from Urmston, with a possible learning disability and a vast knowledge of catering appliances, which briefly attracts Stan towards her. After accompanying Petula to the factory's Christmas party uninvited (as was Petula), it is she who arrives to inform Bren that Petula's caravan has exploded and she needs money, which leads to Bren forfeiting her place in the group holiday to Marbella.

=== Guest stars ===
The ensemble cast occasionally featured notable guest actors, including Joanne Froggatt, Tina Malone, Dora Bryan, Lynda Baron, Elspet Gray, Janette Tough (of The Krankies fame), Henry Kelly, Simon Williams, Kenny Doughty, Lesley Nicol, Eric Sykes and Thora Hird.

== Production ==
=== Writing ===
"I do get very lonely and I nearly jacked it in [...] I thought it was very bad and I couldn't write comedy any more."

— Victoria Wood

The series was written entirely by Victoria Wood, with no additional contributors or script editor. Wood approached writing by allowing plots to develop from interactions between characters, rather than fitting characters into pre-determined storylines.

She wrote the whole six-episode first series in one month; however, she found the second series much harder to write, and even though it had only four more episodes, it took her six months. Wood has attributed this to pressure to do everything herself and loneliness, and has said that she even considered giving up because she thought her scripts were of low quality.

Wood deliberately ended the programme after two series, and the final episode of the second was designed to conclude it. She has said that she "[doesn't] normally do anything twice", but felt that a second series was necessary to do the show justice, and that she knew where to take the show after seeing it air and understanding "what people [have] taken from it". She mentioned the short run of Fawlty Towers when explaining why she planned not to continue the series further. However, in a televised BBC TV documentary about the history of situation comedy at the corporation, Wood complained that the series had been axed by the BBC, despite it being what she described as "a show they couldn't kill".

=== Filming ===
Involving only one set throughout its run (with the exception of quiz show and hospital sets which are both seen on a television screen in the last two episodes), dinnerladies was entirely filmed at the London BBC Television Centre in front of a live studio audience, employing a multiple-camera setup. Other locations such as characters' homes and other parts of the factory are only referred to in conversation.

The set was intended to be as realistic as possible, and even featured a functioning catering toaster from which the studio audience were served toast during filming.

Punchlines were generally delivered at a fast pace with dialogue usually only pausing to allow audience laughter to settle. Each episode was filmed twice in front of two separate audiences, once on a Friday and again on a Saturday. This gave cast members two attempts to perfect a scene and, if necessary, the opportunity to correct mistakes without having to repeat a joke to the same audience. This also gave Wood the opportunity to make script changes that she felt might improve each episode.

The series' director and producer was Geoff Posner, and the executive producers were Philip McIntyre and David Tyler; the programme was co-produced by Victoria Wood's production company Good Fun and Posner's Pozzitive Television.

Wood reprised her character Bren for the BBC's Shaggy Dog Story in 1999.

=== Music ===
The show's theme music was composed by Victoria Wood. It is usually played without lyrics, but at the end of the episodes "Minnellium" and "Toast", vocals which were also written and performed by Wood were included.

== Themes ==
Humour is mostly derived from the conversation and banter between characters, regarding their lives and popular culture, most commonly film and television: dialogue often features humorous misunderstandings, malapropisms and sexual innuendos. The series also features various surreal situations, often involving Bren's mother.

There is also a counterpoint of sadder themes, including deaths in the families of two of the main characters, a painful divorce, one of the characters living with cancer, one character having an unplanned pregnancy, and the underlying heartache in Bren's childhood. Bren and Tony's relationship seems to be eternally thwarted either by themselves or random circumstance.

== Reception ==
=== Critical response ===
dinnerladies was generally well-received, and was praised by critic Tom Paulin.

=== Ratings ===
The viewing figures for series 1 peaked with its premiere at 12.24 million viewers, and series 2 peaked with "Minnellium", which aired on 30 December 1999 and reached 15.33 million viewers.

Overview
Series	Timeslot	Eps	First aired		Last aired		Rank	Avg. viewers (millions)
Series	Timeslot	Eps	Date	Viewers (millions)	Date	Viewers (millions)	Rank	Avg. viewers (millions)
1	Thursday 9:30 pm Thursday 9:35 pm (ep 4)	6	12 November 1998	12.24	17 December 1998	9.43	11	10.02
2	Thursday 9:30 pm	10	25 November 1999	13.86	27 January 2000	13.02	7	12.49

=== Awards ===
The first series won the 1999 Rose d'Or Press Award and "Best New TV Comedy" at the 1999 British Comedy Awards, and the second won "Best TV Comedy" in 2000. The show has also been nominated for the British Academy Television Award for "Best Comedy (Programme or Series)" and the "Situation Comedy Award" in 1998 and 1999 respectively. It came 28th in the BBC's Britain's Best Sitcom poll in 2004.

== Theatre ==
A play based on the series premiered in London in April 2009. The play was based on three episodes of the second series of the TV show, and concentrated on the romance between Bren and Tony. It was directed by David Graham, who also adapted Victoria Wood's original TV scripts for the stage. Gulati and Dunn reprised their original roles from the TV series. The show toured the UK during 2009.

A second show, called Dinnerladies: Second Helpings, toured in 2011 with a new script, once again featuring Dunn, joined by original series cast member Sue Devaney. Shobna Gulati left to return to the soap opera Coronation Street.

In June 2026, it was announced that a new version of the show would tour the UK in 2027, featuring Les Dennis as Stan.

== Home media ==
Dinnerladies was initially released from BBC Video on 12 November 1999, with two individual VHS tapes, the first comprising the first three episode of series one, and the second contains the remaining three episode of series one. The distribution rights were then acquired by Universal Pictures for the release of the complete second series on VHS and, for the first time, on DVD, on 17 November 2003. This was followed by the first series being released in its entirety from Universal on VHS and DVD on 15 November 2004. A complete series set was also made available from Universal on DVD on 15 November 2004.

The series was later reissued on DVD from Universal's subsidiary, Universal Playback, with the complete series boxset receiving distribution on 13 November 2006, followed by individual sets of the first series on 30 April 2007 and the second series on 27 August 2007. A slimline set of the complete series was made available on 24 May 2010.

In Australia, the complete series was released via Reel DVD on 6 November 2013. It was re-released from Madman Entertainment on 1 April 2015.

== See also ==
- British sitcom
