= Sandale transmitting station =

Transmitter station in Cumbria, England

Sandale
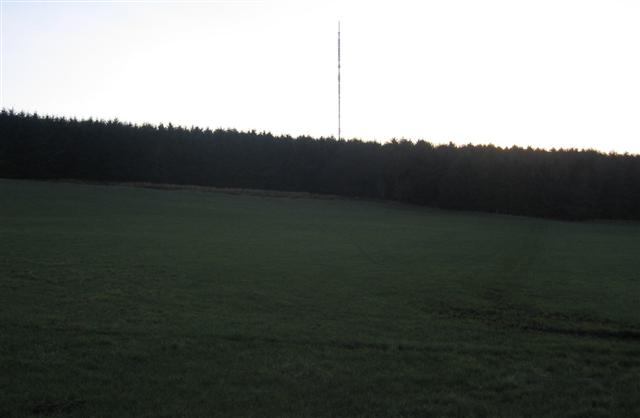

- Location within Cumbria
- Mast height: 153 metres (502 ft)
- Coordinates: 54°44′57″N 3°08′27″W
- Grid reference: NY2657639965
- Built: 1956
- BBC region: BBC North (1956-1985); BBC Scotland (1965-2009)

The Sandale transmitting station is the main radio transmitting station for the county of Cumbria, including the Lake District, and eastern Dumfries and Galloway. It used to broadcast regional variations of BBC One and BBC Two until digital switchover happened in the region. All television channels now come from the nearby Caldbeck transmitting station.

The station is situated on the Caldbeck Fells close to the B5299 road and eight miles south of Wigton. Its mast is 153 metres (502 ft) high.

== History ==
The site was chosen in May 1956, at 1,200ft above sea level, and 14 miles south west of Carlisle. It would bring BBC television to Cumberland and Westmorland, and to south west of the Scottish Borders reaching Moffat, Stranraer, and Portpatrick, and BBC national radio.

The 14 acre site took three years to build.

== Transmission ==
=== Radio ===
In mid 1958, it would be one of three transmitters to take the Scottish BBC Home Service on 92.5 VHF, which became BBC Radio 4 Scotland in 1967 until November 1978. National VHF radio began on August 18 1958, with the current FM frequencies.

Until 1993 it broadcast Radio Solway. Now it broadcasts BBC Radio Scotland on the same frequency.

=== Television ===
BBC television started at 2pm on Monday December 9 1957, with tests from December 2 1957, with BBC 'News from the North', alongside the transmitter at Pontop Pike, originating from Manchester.

From January 5 1959, with Pontop Pike, it took BBC local news originating from Newcastle, on 405 lines.

== Services from this transmitter ==
=== Analogue radio (FM VHF) ===
Frequency	kW	Service
88.1 MHz	250	BBC Radio 2
90.3 MHz	250	BBC Radio 3
92.5 MHz	250	BBC Radio 4
94.7 MHz	250	BBC Radio Scotland
95.6 MHz	15	BBC Radio Cumbria
97.7 MHz	250	BBC Radio 1
99.9 MHz	125	Classic FM

=== Digital radio (DAB) ===
Frequency	Block	kW	Operator
225.648 MHz	12B	10	BBC National DAB

=== Analogue television ===
==== 8 November 1956 – 27 September 1965 ====
Frequency	VHF	kW	Service
61.75 MHz	4	30	BBC Television

==== 27 September 1965 – 1 June 1979 ====
Frequency	VHF	kW	Service
61.75 MHz	4	30	BBC1 North East
179.75 MHz	6	70	BBC1 Scotland

==== 1 June 1979 – 3 January 1985 ====
Frequency	VHF	UHF	kW	Service
61.75 MHz	4	—	30	BBC1 North East
179.75 MHz	6	—	70	BBC1 Scotland
479.25 MHz	—	22	500	BBC1 Scotland

==== 3 January 1985 - 1992 ====
405-line TV ceased. Until 1992, BBC1 Scotland was the only TV channel transmitted from Sandale.

Frequency	UHF	kW	Service
479.25 MHz	22	500	BBC1 Scotland

==== 1992 - 22 July 2009 ====
After the Digital Switchover in Sandale/Caldbeck, Sandale no longer broadcast television because its Scotland multiplex was moved to Caldbeck.

Frequency	UHF	kW	Service
479.25 MHz	22	500	BBC1 Scotland
839.25 MHz	67	126	BBC2 Scotland

== See also ==
- List of tallest buildings and structures in Great Britain
