= Helen Millican =

British radio presenter

- Born: Helen Millican
- Presenting career
- Show: Farming Today, On Your Farm
- Station: BBC Radio 4
- Style: Radio presenter
- Country: United Kingdom

Helen Millican is a British radio presenter, producer and reporter from Cumbria England. She is best known for presenting BBC Radio 4's Farming Today, On Your Farm and programmes for BBC Radio Cumbria.

== Life ==
Millican studied at the University of Oxford, achieving a first class Bachelor of Arts, Foreign Languages, Literatures, and Linguistics. Millican later Studied French and German (joint honours), spent one academic year in Germany with extended periods working in France.

== Career ==
Millican began her broadcasting career at BBC Radio Cumbria in 2016, presenting various programmes on the station including weekend breakfast, afternoons and evening programmes alongside covering mid mornings. In 2023, Millican left her regular presenting duties due to BBC Local Radio cuts though she later returned to cover programmes. Millican later joined BBC Radio 4 to report for Farming Today and On Your Farm.

Alongside her broadcasting and reporting work, Millican worked as the narrator for a BBC Four and BBC iPlayer documentary 'Cumbria's Red Squirrels'.

Millican often hosts book events across Cumbria, interviewing the authors such as James Rebanks and McCall Smiths to large crowds.
