= John Gillmore =

British broadcaster

- Born: Prescot, England
- Career
- Station(s): BBC Radio Lancashire, BBC Radio Cumbria, BBC Radio Merseyside
- Country: United Kingdom

John Gillmore (born c. 1956) is an English broadcaster and compere. During his 38-year career, he was a presenter on BBC Radio Lancashire, BBC Radio Cumbria and BBC Radio Merseyside.

== Career ==
Born in Prescot, Gillmore got his start in voiceover work for commercial radio, and volunteered in hospital radio at Whiston Hospital. He landed his first stint as a presenter at Red Rose Radio in 1985, where he worked for 13 years, presenting every programme on the station.

Gillmore (nicknamed Gilly) went on to work as a broadcaster for various stations throughout the United Kingdom, including Rock FM, The Bay (Lancaster) and, from 2005, BBC Radio Lancashire. His shows were often simulcast on BBC Radio Cumbria and BBC Radio Merseyside.

On 5 October 2023, Gillmore hosted his final Late Show, due to BBC Local Radio cuts. Gillmore currently hosts events across Lancashire with local authors.

== Awards ==
Gillmore is a Guinness World Record holder, for the most radio interviews conducted in 24 hours. Gilly held 293 interviews during his "Gillathon", in aid of BBC Children in Need in 2014. During a 24-hour period, Gillmore asked 1,649 unique questions to girl guides, a choir and members of a jujitsu club. He also won the Lancashire Ambassador Award at the Best of Lancashire Awards in 2022.
