= Paul Salt =

English radio and television presenter

- Born: Stafford, England
- Presenting career
- Station: BBC Radio Merseyside (present)
- Style: Radio presenter
- Country: United Kingdom

Paul Salt is an English radio and television presenter, best known for his work on BBC Radio Merseyside in Liverpool, England.

== Personal life ==
Salt grew up in Stafford and lives in Liverpool, England. He is married and has two children.

== Career ==
Salt began working in radio at the age of 17 in which he joined Signal Radio as a Saturday sports production assistant at the age of 17. In 1991, he joined Liverpool's Radio City in 1991, later becoming deputy news editor, then Century FM in 2005, winning a Sony award for his breakfast show.

Salt has freelanced for BBC World Service and BBC Radio Stoke. In 2012, he joined BBC Radio Merseyside and has presented various programmes on the station On 10 August 2023, Salt presented his final breakfast show, announcing that he would be moving to weekends to present a sport programme on the station.

On television, Salt is a regular contributor for Liverpool FCs LFCTV.
