= Val Armstrong =

Radio presenter

- Born: Valerie Ann Armstrong; October 1964 (age 61–62); Lancaster, Lancashire, England
- Presenting career
- Style: Radio presenter and journalist
- Country: United Kingdom

Val Armstrong is an English radio presenter and broadcast journalist. She is best known for her work on BBC Radio Cumbria.

== Career ==
Val Armstrong began working in radio at the age of 17. In 1982, she joined BBC Radio Carlisle - now BBC Radio Cumbria. She has worked as a journalist, producer, and presenter. She is experienced in presenting a wide range or programmes. Prior to her broadcasting career, Val had a Saturday job in a jeans shop and a worked part time in a cotton wool factory.

She regularly raises funds and awareness for Macmillan Cancer Support, after battling cancer twice. Armstrong kept a diary of her cancer journey for the BBC news website.

She has raised thousands of pounds for a whole variety of charities - both local and national - across the years. She is the current Chairman of Cumbria Women of the Year Committee and is a Girl Guide Ambassador. She has recently taken on the role as Ambassador for Eden Valley Hospice and Jigsaw. Armstrong is also a Patron of Blood Bikes, Cumbria. She is the former Chairwoman of Carlisle Breast Care Support, former President of Carlisle Musical Society and former Trustee of the Oaktree Animal Charity.

In September 2023, Armstrong announced on air that she was to leave the BBC after 41 years of broadcasting, latterly having hosted a daily show on Radio Cumbria, citing the changes that were to take place to the local radio network. She broadcast her last show on 22 September 2023.

She announced on her last show she was training to become a celebrant. She has owned The Gatehouse Cafe at Carlisle's Richardson Street Cemetery since 2016.

In April 2024 it was announced that Val would return to radio. She joined the team at Carlisle's brand new community radio station CRFM - a non for profit station based in the city. She presents their weekday breakfast show Monday to Thursday from 7-9am.

== Personal life ==
Armstrong has previously battled breast cancer in both 2006 and 2010 and underwent a double mastectomy. She lives in Carlisle, England.

She revealed in 2019 she had been suffering from depression triggered by her anti-cancer medication.

== Awards ==
In 2011, Armstrong was announced as 'Cumbrian Woman Of The Year'.

In 2023, Armstrong was honoured by being given 'The Freedom Of The City of Carlisle' by Carlisle City Council - only the third woman in the city's history to be honoured with this title, and the only living female recipient.
