= Liverpool Live Radio =

English radio station

Coordinates: 53.39549°N 2.98240°W

- Liverpool, England; United Kingdom
- Broadcast area: Liverpool, Merseyside
- Frequencies: DAB+; Freeview 277
- RDS: LIVERPOOL LIVE RADIO

Programming
- Language: English

Ownership
- Owner: Liverpool Live Ltd

History
- First air date: 2020

Links
- Website: www.liverpoolliveradio.com

Liverpool Live Radio is a local radio station serving the people of Liverpool, North West England, and North Wales. The station also broadcasts worldwide online.

== History ==
Liverpool Live Radio launched in 2020. The station broadcasts on DAB+ to Merseyside and north Wales, online and also via Freeview. The station has won awards, including 'Best Media Outlet' at the Sound Media Awards.

== Notable presenters ==
- Billy Butler, previously a presenter at Radio City and BBC Radio Merseyside
- Frankie Connor, former member of The Hideaways and previously a presenter on BBC Radio Merseyside
- Shaun Tilley, a former Radio City presenter.
- Linda McDermott, a former BBC Radio Merseyside presenter, now presents her Late Show on a Sunday evening.
