= BBC Radio Cumbria =

Radio station in Carlisle, England

Coordinates: 54.8958°N 2.9408°W

- Carlisle; England
- Broadcast area: Cumbria
- Frequencies: FM: 95.2 MHz (Kendal); FM: 95.6 MHz (Cumbria); FM: 96.1 MHz (Barrow-in-Furness, and Morecambe Bay); FM: 104.1 MHz (Whitehaven); FM: 104.2 MHz (Windermere); AM: 756 kHz (North Cumbria) (until the end of November 2026); AM: 837 kHz (South Cumbria) (until the end of November 2026); DAB+: 11B (Morecambe Bay and North Cumbria); Freeview: 713
- RDS: BBC CMBR

Programming
- Language: English
- Format: Local news, talk, music and sport

Ownership
- Owner: BBC Local Radio, BBC North East and Cumbria (North and Mid), BBC North West (South)

History
- First air date: 24 November 1973
- Former names: BBC Radio Carlisle (1973–1982)
- Former frequencies: 1458 MW

Technical information
- Licensing authority: Ofcom

Links
- Website: BBC Radio Cumbria

BBC Radio Cumbria is the BBC's local radio station serving the county of Cumbria.

It broadcasts on FM, AM (until the end of November 2026), DAB, digital TV and via BBC Sounds from studios in Carlisle.

According to RAJAR, the station has a weekly audience of 80,000 listeners and a 8.4% share as of May 2025.

== History ==
The county of Cumbria, from which the station takes its current name, was not created until 1974. Radio Cumbria began service on 24 November 1973 as BBC Radio Carlisle and could be received across most of the former county of Cumberland.

The station adopted its current name in May 1982, when its service was expanded to cover the whole of the administrative county of Cumbria, namely:

- The former counties of Cumberland and Westmorland
- The former exclave of Lancashire "North of the Sands"
- The small area of the former West Riding of Yorkshire, around Sedbergh and Dent, that had been moved from Yorkshire into Cumbria.

== BBC Radio Furness opt-out ==
From the launch of the renamed station, between 25 May 1982 and 1991, an opt-out service, BBC Radio Furness operated in the south of the county at peak times – originally breakfast and lunchtimes on weekdays, and Saturday mornings. Programmes were produced in Barrow-in-Furness and used 96.1 MHz and 837 kHz. This meant that, in addition to the Furness area, Radio Furness could be received along the south coast of Cumbria, in parts of the Lake District, and the west coast as far as Millom.

"Radio Furness" lost its separate branding in 1991 but breakfast and afternoon opt-outs for the South Lakes and Furness continued until 1994. As a result of BBC cutbacks in the 1990s, programme opt-outs were curtailed, although the Barrow studios remained staffed. The former studio in Hartington Street is now the local headquarters for the Labour Party.

== Background ==
Radio Cumbria claims to be listened to by one-third of the county's population, despite having to face the challenge of an area that is sparsely populated and predominantly rural, with the biggest urban areas around its perimeter. Most programming has a similar format to that of other BBC local radio stations, although one unique feature is the seasonal Lamb Bank – a short daily segment which carries announcements from farmers wishing to exchange livestock.

== Technical ==
On FM, Radio Cumbria broadcasts to northern Cumbria on 95.6 MHz (Sandale) – suitable for drivers on the M6 north of Penrith – and to the south of the county on 96.1 MHz (Morecambe Bay), with lower-powered relays on 95.2 MHz (Kendal), 104.1 MHz (Whitehaven) and 104.2 MHz (Windermere).

On medium wave, the station broadcasts on 756 kHz (Brisco – Carlisle) and 837 kHz (Barrow-in-Furness), but are scheduled to be switched off at the end of November 2026, as part of the final phase of medium wave switch-offs of BBC Local Radio. Until 2020, it was also broadcast on 1458 kHz (Whitehaven).

The station also broadcasts on DAB+. DAB+ transmissions began for the station on 1 December 2021, which was the day that the Cumbria multiplex was switched on. Until then, BBC Radio Cumbria had been the only BBC local radio station that wasn't broadcasting on DAB.

The station is also available on Freeview TV channel 713 in the BBC North East and Cumbria and BBC North West regions and streams online via BBC Sounds.

== Programming ==
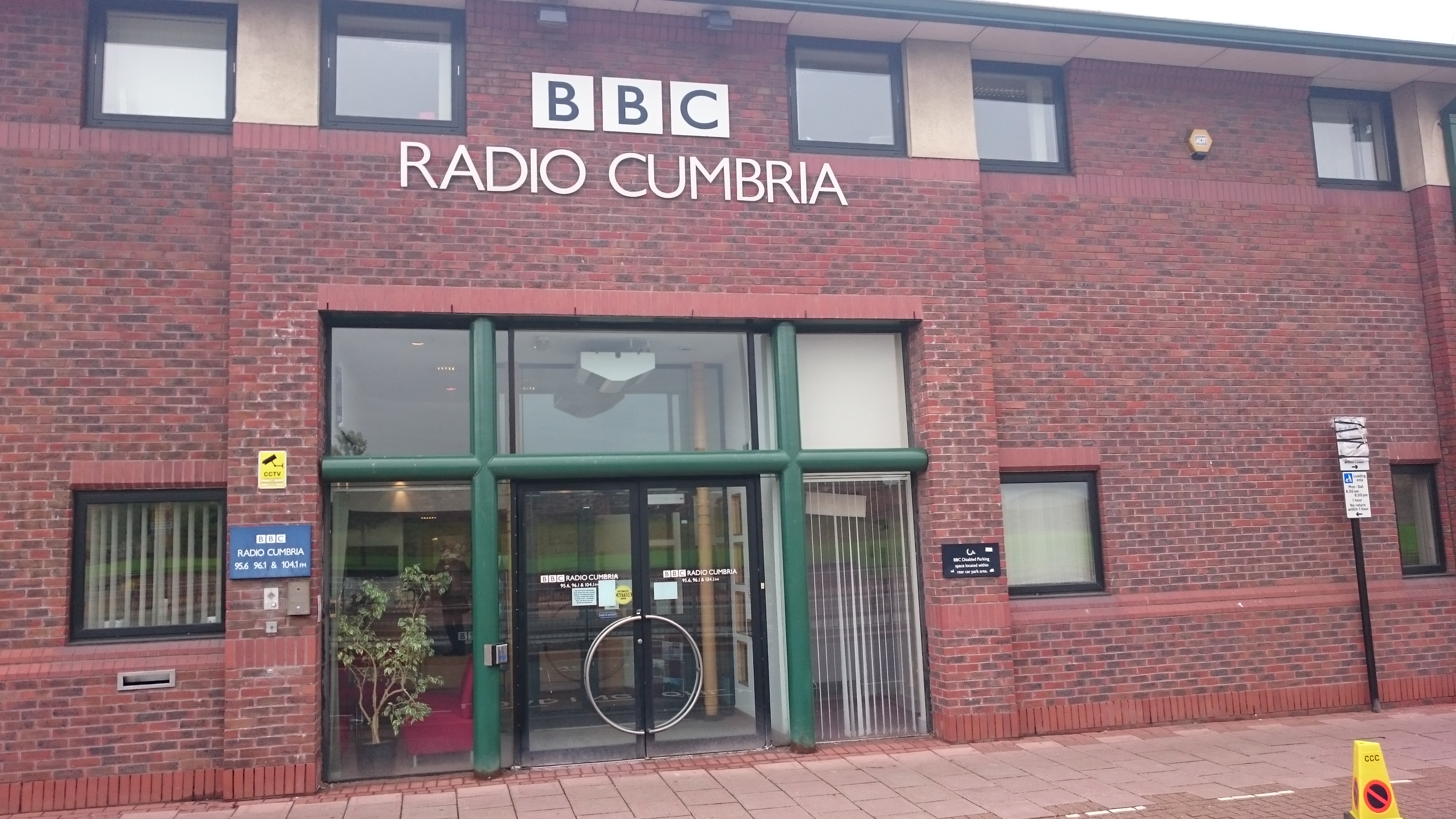
BBC Radio Cumbria's studios in Carlisle

Local programming is produced and broadcast from the BBC's Carlisle studios from 6 am to 2 pm weekdays and for sports coverage. The Saturday Breakfast show also broadcasts locally.

From 10 pm each night, BBC Radio Cumbria carries the England-wide late show; from 1 am, it simulcasts BBC Radio 5 Live. Previously, the station's late show had originated from BBC Radio Lancashire on Monday to Thursday nights and BBC Radio Newcastle on Friday to Sunday nights.

== BBC Radio Cumbria Sport / BBC Sport Cumbria ==
The station's sport service provides exclusive commentary on Cumbria's two professional English Football League clubs, Carlisle United and Barrow, along with exclusive commentaries on the county's three semi-professional rugby league clubs, Barrow Raiders, Workington Town and Whitehaven.

BBC Cumbria Sport can also be found on Twitter and on BBC Sounds.

The station's sport department won a Radio Academy Award in 2003 for its Saturday Sport show, a Carlisle United debate, facing competition in the Sport category from BBC World Service, Capital Gold and BBC Radio 5 Live.

== Presenters ==
=== Current ===
- Mike Zeller
- Steph Finnon
- Nishma Hindocha
- Ian Brannan
- Hayley Kay
- Fiona Sadler
- Joe Wilson

=== Former presenters ===
- Val Armstrong
- John Gillmore
- Richard Hammond
- Richard Madeley
- John Myers
- Helen Skelton
- Alan Smith (now at BBC Radio 4)
- Helen Millican (now at BBC Radio 4)
- Norman Thomas
- Frank Wappat

== See also ==
- Greatest Hits Radio Cumbria & South West Scotland
- Eden FM Radio
- Heart North West
- Smooth Lake District
