= Norman Thomas (broadcaster) =

British broadcaster (circa 1947-2011)

- Born: 1947 or 1948; St Helens, Lancashire, United Kingdom
- Died: May 2011 (aged 63)
- Presenting career
- Station: Radio City
- Style: Presenter
- Country: United Kingdom

Norman Thomas (1947 or 1948 – May 2011) was a British broadcaster, businessman and journalist. As one of the founding members of Liverpool's Radio City he became a well established radio personality in the north west region.

== Life and career ==
Thomas was born in St Helens, Lancashire and worked as a schoolteacher at a school in Liverpool's Dingle area before moving into broadcasting in the mid-1970s. His career as a radio presenter began in 1974 with the launch of Radio City in Liverpool when he joined the station as part of its original line-up. He quickly became a popular personality in the area and developed a huge following during his time at the station, becoming affectionately known as "Little NT" and "Uncle Norm". From 1978 to 1986 he presented Radio City's breakfast show. However, he later moved on from Radio City, working for BBC Radio Merseyside and BBC Radio Lancashire, and for a time he also presented a syndicated programme across the north west region. He later made a brief return to Radio City, and also presented on Lancashire's Red Rose Radio. Away from broadcasting Thomas ran several businesses, including a travel agents, and during the 1980s was a columnist with the Liverpool Echo.

In 1990 Thomas and his family survived a gas explosion at their home in Bickerstaffe, near Ormskirk, Lancs. Thomas used heavy lifting gear to free his son from the rubble, and was one of five people treated at hospital following the blast.
