= Roger Hill (broadcaster) =

British radio presenter

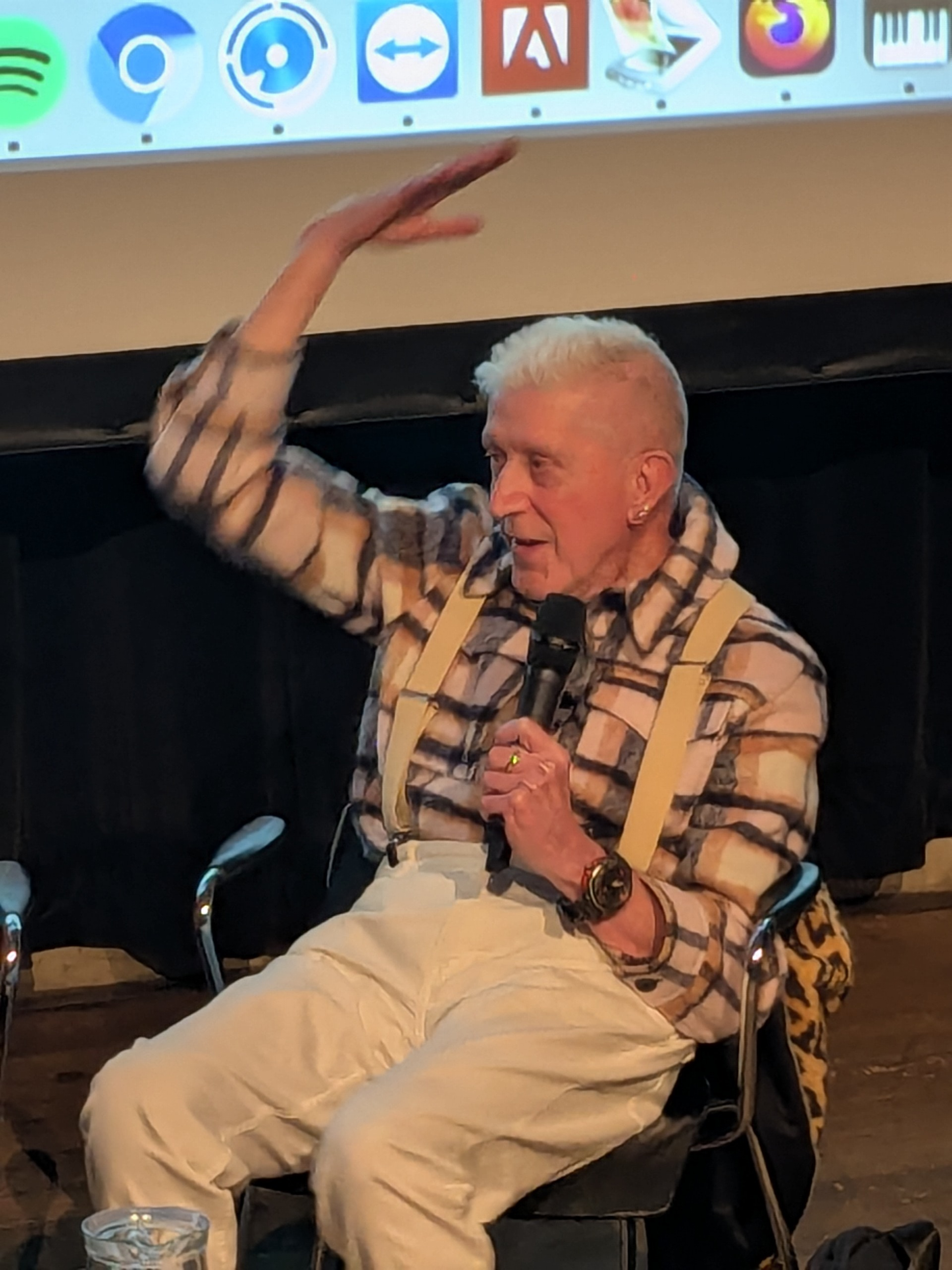
- Hill speaking on a panel discussion, 2025
- Born: Roger Hill
- Presenting career
- Show: The Popular Music Show
- Station: BBC Radio Merseyside
- Time slot: Weekly, Sundays at 9 pm
- Style: Television and radio presenter
- Country: United Kingdom

Roger Hill is a British radio presenter, producer and art director, from Leicester England. He is best known for presenting the UK's longest-running alternative music programme The Popular Music Show on BBC Radio Merseyside.

== Life ==
Hill was raised in Leicester, England. He studied at Cambridge University, receiving a degree in English and Drama.

Hill went on to become a teacher in Leeds, England. After he left the city, he was unemployed and put on one of the first job creation schemes, after moving in with his brother in Newcastle Upon Tyne, and found work in a theatre company in Liverpool.

== Career ==
In the 1970s and 1980s, he helped local teenagers to act, write and direct as a director at Liverpool’s Everyman Youth Theatre.

In the 1990s, he performed on stage as his alter ego Mandy Romero. Hill has presented 'The Popular Music Show' (or 'PMS') since 1982 when he joined BBC Radio Merseyside. It was previously called 'Pure Musical Sensations' and 'Rockaround'. It was first presented by Phil Ross. The programme was previously rock-oriented, with various musical genres added in later years. Roger was asked to take over the show after Ross left to work in London.

Hill also presents 'PMS' on the digital radio station Melodic Distraction.

In 2015, Hill was featured in a BBC Radio 4 programme 'Man with the Mohican', highlighting the impact Hill had on generations of city performers.

In 2022, Hill celebrated 40 years as the presenter and producer of 'The Popular Music Show' on the BBC, with a special edition of the programme.

Hill helped set up the Citadel Arts Centre in St Helens, in which he contributed to Arts Council policy on community theatre.

Hill was previously a lecturer at the Liverpool Institute of Performance Arts.

Alongside broadcasting, Hill has worked in educational research, theatre, drama and Performance Art duties at the Bluecoat Art Centre.
