= June Yee =

British radio presenter

- Born: June Yee
- Presenting career
- Show: Orient Express
- Station: BBC Radio Merseyside
- Time slot: Weekly, Mondays at 9pm
- Style: Radio presenter
- Country: United Kingdom

June Yee is a British-Chinese radio presenter from Liverpool England. She is best known for presenting BBC Radio Merseyside's weekly Chinese programme called 'Orient Express' since the 1980s.

== Life ==
Yee was born in Stoke On Trent and raised in Liverpool, England. June attended Queen Mary High School in Liverpool.

== Career ==
Yee began her broadcasting career at BBC Radio Merseyside in 1988, alongside Lawrence Ma and Mary Ng. She took on various roles including the production and planning of five-minute news bulletins, before becoming a presenter.

In 2014, Yee took part in a special broadcast for the BBC based on the Chinese Community, at Liverpool's History Museum. Alongside her radio career, Yee works in accountancy and is also a long-time school governor of Bidston Avenue Primary School.

June currently presents the weekly version of 'Orient Express', alongside co-host Billy Hui BEM, on Monday evenings on BBC Radio Merseyside.

On 27th July 2025, Yee presented Pick Of The Week on BBC Radio 4.

In November 2025, Yee was featured in the Radio Times' 'Face Behind The Voice' feature about her life and career in broadcasting.
