= Bernard Wrigley =

English singer, actor and comedian (born 1948)

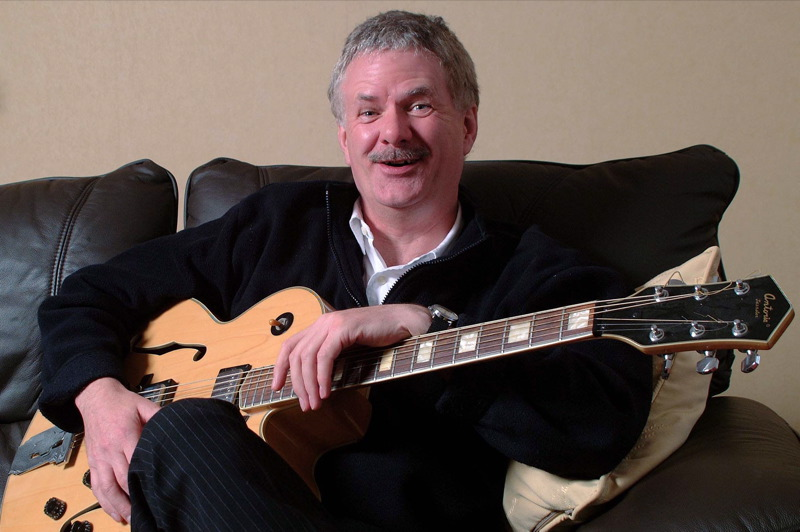
Bernard Wrigley

Bernard Wrigley (born 25 February 1948 in Bolton, Lancashire, England) is an English singer, actor and comedian. He is sometimes known by the nickname "The Bolton Bullfrog".

Wrigley's career as a singer and storyteller began in the late 1960s, when a love of folk music led him to perform in folk clubs. Since then he has released over sixteen albums of traditional and original songs, stories and monologues. His main instruments are the guitar and concertina.

He began acting around the same time and has made many appearances on stage, most famously in Samuel Beckett's Waiting for Godot alongside Mike Harding at Bolton's Octagon Theatre, and Jim Cartwright's Road at the Royal Exchange Theatre, Manchester.

Wrigley has made many appearances in British TV programmes in a career spanning over five decades, including Phoenix Nights (where he was Dodgy Eric, who sold club owner Brian Potter a Das Boot fruit machine, a bucking bronco and an obscene bouncy castle), Emmerdale (as eccentric rocket inventor Barry Clegg) and Coronation Street (most recently as the Rev. Marvin Winstanley, the shady 'internet priest' whom Roy and Hayley approached to arrange their wedding - Wrigley's sixth character in the soap). His other credits include Wood and Walters, Home and Away, Last of the Summer Wine, Cold Feet, Coogan's Run, dinnerladies, Victoria Wood with All the Trimmings, Shameless, Heartbeat In with the Flynns,Fat Friends and All Creatures Great and Small. He also appeared as a union official in Brassed Off and as a school teacher in Rita, Sue and Bob Too. In 1978 he was a night school teacher in Alan Bennett's play, Me! I'm Afraid of Virginia Woolf.

On BBC Radio 4 he has acted in plays lasting from 15 to 90 minutes. BBC Radio Lancashire has broadcast many of his pre-recorded series, such as Wrigley's Ramblings and Home Brewed, and his readings of many stories written by Tommy Thompson.

As a writer he has released various combinations of his songs and monologues. In 2006, he produced a book of silly one-verse poems Shorts For All Occasions, which was followed in 2008 by The Longs & The Shorts Of It.

== Discography ==
- The Phenomenal B. Wrigley (1971)
- Rough and Wrigley (1974)
- Songs, Stories & Elephants (1976)
- Ten Ton Special (1976)
- The Bolton Bullfrog (1981)
- Rude Bits! (1985)
- The Instrumental Album (1988)
- Wanted: Live! (1991)
- Buggerlugs (1992)
- Albert, Arthur & the Car Park (1997)
- Magnificent Monologues (2000)
- Fairly Truthful Tales (2002)
- Magnificent Monologues Volume 2 (2002)
- Monologology (2003)
- Amblethwaite 'Appenings (2004)
- God's Own County (2005)
- Every Song Tells a Story (2009)
- Songs of the Seven Seas (2011)
