= BBC Radio Merseyside =

Coordinates: 53.399097°N 2.992277°W

Liverpool; England
- Broadcast area: Merseyside, north and west Cheshire and west Lancashire
- Frequencies: FM: 95.8 MHz; DAB: 10C; Freeview: 714
- RDS: BBC_MRSY

Programming
- Language: English
- Format: Local news, sport, talk and music
- Network: BBC Local Radio

Ownership
- Owner: BBC
- Operator: BBC North West

History
- First air date: 22 November 1967
- Former names: BBC Merseyside
- Former frequencies: 1485 MW

Technical information
- Licensing authority: Ofcom

Links
- Website: BBC Radio Merseyside

BBC Radio Merseyside is the BBC's local radio station serving Merseyside, North and West Cheshire and West Lancashire. It broadcasts on FM, DAB, digital TV and via BBC Sounds, from studios on Hanover Street in Liverpool. According to RAJAR, the station has a weekly audience of 205,000 listeners and a 4.7% share as of June 2025.

== History ==
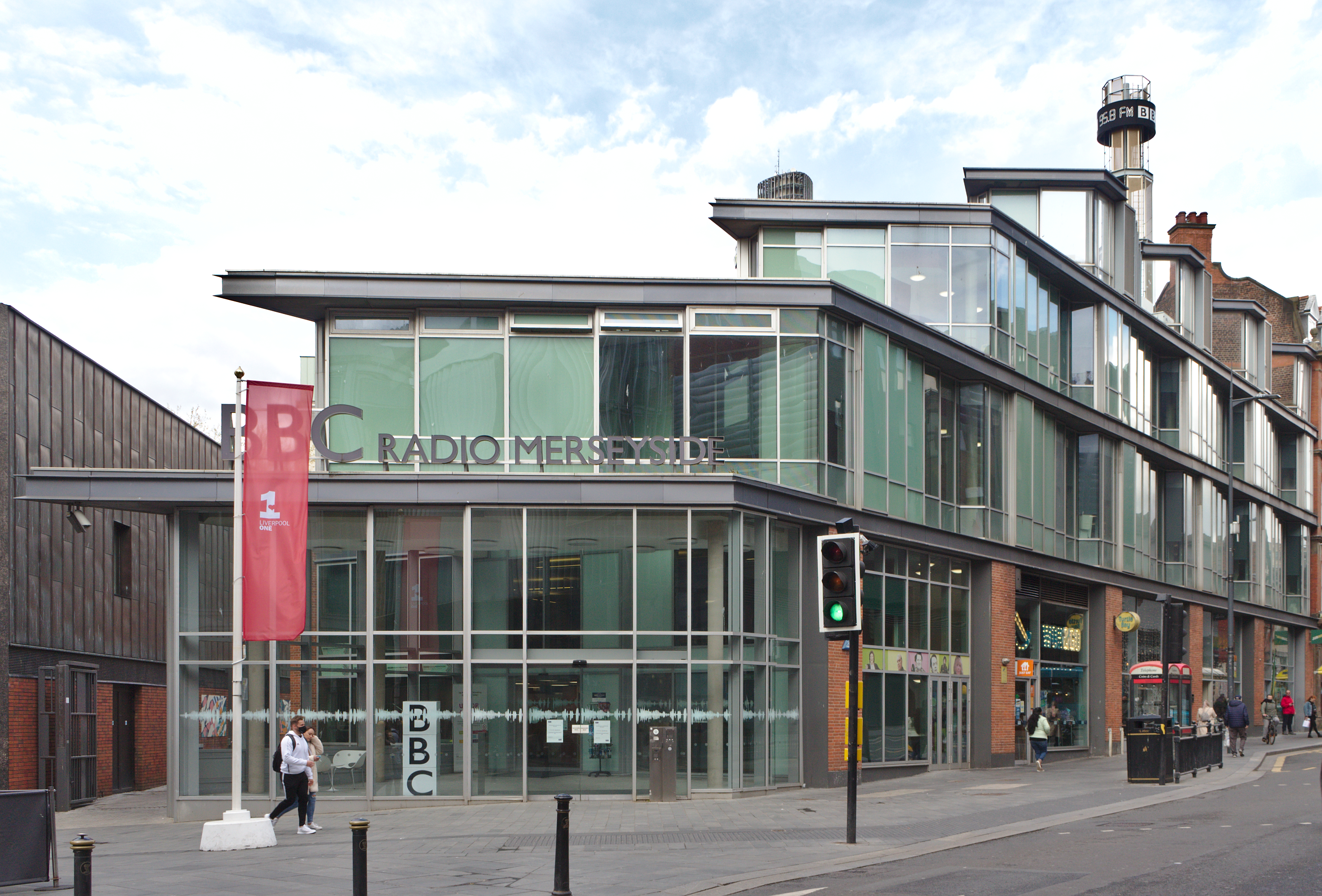
Radio Merseyside studios, 2021

BBC Radio Merseyside was the third BBC Local Radio station to start broadcasting, launching on 22 November 1967 and broadcasting from the sixth floor of council-owned offices in Commerce House, Liverpool. In late 1981, Radio Merseyside moved to a new purpose-built studios on Paradise Street, Liverpool. Broadcasts began from the new studios on 7 December 1981. On 15 July 2006, Radio Merseyside moved from its former home to a new purpose-built studio building on the corner of Hanover Street and College Lane in Liverpool. This building has two ground-floor studios next to a public performance space. An open learning centre was previously located on the first floor and the main office is on the second floor.

In October 2006, the studio building was nominated and made the Building Design shortlist for the inaugural Carbuncle Cup, which was ultimately awarded to Drake Circus Shopping Centre in Plymouth.

Until the late 1980s the station was generally on air from breakfast until teatime, with any local programming after 6 pm being specialist music and magazines aimed at specialist interests and ethnic minority programming, such as Orient Express with June Yee. with BBC Radio 2 being carried during the evening and overnight. In early 1989, the four BBC stations in North West England launched an evening service called Network North West. This replaced the Radio 2 simulcast with regional programming. The strand was broadcast each night from 7:30 pm until midnight. In May 1991, the four north-west stations joined the BBC Night Network, which had previously provided evening programming for the BBC's six North East and Yorkshire stations. At this point, local broadcasts ended at 7:05 pm (7 pm at weekends) until midnight, extending to 12:30 am in the early 1990s, and to 1 am by the end of that decade.

== Technical ==
BBC Radio Merseyside broadcasts on 95.8 MHz (Allerton Park) and DAB from the Allerton Park site and DAB signals come from the Bauer Liverpool 10C Multiplex from Billinge Hill (between St Helens and Wigan), Hope Mountain (between Buckley and Wrexham) and St Johns Beacon.

In 2018, BBC Radio Merseyside launched on BBC Sounds. Local sports commentaries are not broadcast on this service, due to licensing agreements.

The station also broadcasts on Freeview TV channel 714 in the BBC North West region.

In March 2020, BBC Radio Merseyside's 1485 AM license was handed back to Ofcom.

== Programming ==
Local programming is produced and broadcast from the BBC's Liverpool studios from 6 am to 6 pm on weekdays and for sports coverage. Until October 2023, the station's late show was simulcast with BBC Radio Lancashire on Friday nights and originated from BBC Radio Manchester on Saturday and Sunday nights. It was replaced by an England-wide late show which is broadcast seven days a week.

During the station's overnight downtime, BBC Radio Merseyside simulcasts overnight programming from BBC Radio 5 Live.

== Presenters ==
=== Notable past presenters ===
- Billy Butler (now at InDemand Decades)
- Shelagh Fogarty (now on LBC)
- John Gillmore
- Gerry Harrison
- Eddie Hemmings
- Roger Hill
- Brian Jacques
- Debi Jones (now at Delux Radio)
- Janice Long (went on to BBC Radio Wales and Greatest Hits Radio)
- Billy Maher
- Rob McCaffrey
- Jenny Collins
- Linda McDermott (now at Liverpool Live Radio)
- Simon O'Brien
- Alan Parry (now on Sky Sports)
- Steve Parry
- Pete Price
- Paul Salt
- Ray Stubbs (now at Talksport 2)
- Norman Thomas
