= Tina Malone =

English actress (born 1963)

- Born: Christina Malone; 30 January 1963 (age 63); Toxteth, Liverpool, England
- Occupation: Actress
- Years active: 1988–present
- Television: Brookside; Shameless; Celebrity Big Brother
- Spouse: Paul Chase (m. 2010; died 2024)
- Children: 2

Christina Malone (born 30 January 1963) is an English actress. She is best known for portraying the roles of Mo McGee in Brookside and Mimi Maguire in Shameless, both broadcast on Channel 4. She was also a housemate on the sixth series of Celebrity Big Brother in January 2009.

== Early life ==
Malone was born on 30 January 1963 in Toxteth, Liverpool, the daughter of Olwyn and Frank Malone. She attended Liverpool Institute High School for Girls and Childwall College.

== Career ==
Malone played Mo McGee in Brookside from 1993 until 1998 and Mimi Maguire in Shameless from 2005 until 2013. Other television roles include playing a nurse called Bobbie in Victoria Wood's dinnerladies.

On 2 January 2009, Malone entered the Celebrity Big Brother house to compete in the sixth series. She was the seventh person to enter and was immediately picked up on her loudness. On 16 January, Malone was the second person to be evicted from the Celebrity Big Brother House. From 8–11 September 2009, Malone directed and starred in Kerry Williams' play MeeT ThE DeAN's at the Unity Theatre, Liverpool.

Malone appeared on Celebrity Four Weddings in December 2010, which she won. She also appeared in Scousers in St Helens on 26 October 2010.

In 2016, she was a contestant on Celebrity MasterChef. In May 2019 Malone played Elaine McDermott in the 5Star prison drama Clink. In August 2019, she was a contestant on Celebs on the Farm and was first to be eliminated.

== Personal life ==
Malone runs her own acting school, To Be Frank Productions, in Manchester. The school produces plays in local Liverpool theatres such as the Everyman Theatre. The drama school is named after her late father, Frank Malone. She also used to run an agency with Dean Sullivan called DSTM. Malone has stated that she has obsessive–compulsive disorder and bipolar disorder.

Malone's oldest daughter Dannielle, who she gave birth to in 1982, is also an actress, and has appeared in Hollyoaks.

In May 2012, Malone was declared bankrupt.

In 2013, she gave birth to a second daughter named Flame Chase at age 50.

In March 2019, Malone pleaded guilty to contempt of court, having shared a social media post which purported to reveal the new identity of Jon Venables, one of two boys who murdered James Bulger, contrary to a court order. She was given an eight-month prison sentence which was suspended for two years.

In October 2019, Malone announced, via Twitter, that she and her husband Paul Chase had separated after 11 years together. They reconciled in February 2020. Chase died by suicide in March 2024.

== Filmography ==
Year	Title	Role	Notes
1991	Blonde Fist	Mrs. Crane	Supporting role
1992	The Long Day Closes	Edna	Supporting role
1992	Between the Lines	Waitress	1 episode
1993	Scene	Joyce	1 episode
1993–1998	Brookside	Mo McGee	Recurring role
1994	Screen Two	Chrissie	1 episode
1994–1997	Common As Muck	Moira	3 episodes
1996	The Liver Birds	Nightclub Friend	1 episode
1999	Dinnerladies	Bobbie	Episode: "Fog"
2000	Nature Boy	Jane	1 episode
2000	Married 2 Malcolm	Female Tourist	Minor role
2001	Starhunter	Rex	1 episode
2002	Five Ways John Wayne Didn't Die	Various	Short film
2002	Nice Guy Eddie	Chairwoman	Recurring role; 2 episodes
2002	Tough Love	Mrs. Smith	Television film
2003	Henry VIII	Nurse	Television film
2005	Fingersmith	Nurse Spiller	Recurring role; 2 episodes
2005–2013	Shameless	Mimi Maguire	Series regular; 112 episodes
2006	Only One of These Things Is True	Mrs. Crank	Short film
2006	Longford	Elsie	Television film
2008	Simon and Emily	Ellen	Supporting role
2008–2014	The Wright Stuff	Herself	Guest panellist; 3 episodes
2008–2017	Loose Women	Herself	Guest; 9 episodes
2009	Celebrity Big Brother	Herself	Contestant
2009	The Sunday Night Project	Herself	Guest; 1 episode
2010	Celebrity Big Brother's Big Mouth	Herself	Guest panellist; 1 episode
2010–2019	This Morning	Herself	Guest (7 episodes)
2012	Come Dine with Me	Herself	Guest; 1 episode
2012–2013	Big Brother's Bit on the Side	Herself	Guest panellist; 2 episodes
2013	Splash!	Herself	Contestant
2013	8 out of 10 Cats	Herself	Guest; 1 episode
2013	The Jeremy Kyle Show	Herself	Guest: 1 episode
2013	The Chase	Herself	Contestant; 1 episode
2014	Who's Doing the Dishes?	Herself	Participant; 1 episode
2014	Celebrity Fifteen to One	Herself	Contestant; 1 episode
2014	Staff Room	Mrs. Rothwell	1 episode
2015	Celebrity Mastermind	Herself	Contestant; 1 episode
2015	Tina Malone: My New Body	Herself	Documentary
2016	Celebrity MasterChef	Herself	Contestant
2016	Pointless Celebrities	Herself	Contestant; 1 episode
2016–2017	The Funny Thing About...	Herself	Guest; 2 episodes
2019	Celebs on the Farm	Herself	Contestant
2019	Green Fingers	Daria	1 episode
2019	Clink	Elaine McDermott	Recurring role; 4 episodes
2020	The Gift Musical	Sandra	Short film
2020	Tin Star	Betty Marbury	1 episode
2021	Blind Faith	Sister Beach	Short film
2022	Tonight LIVE with Dan Wootton	Herself	Guest (1 episode)
2022	Tonight LIVE with Mark Dolan	Herself	Guest (1 episode)
2023	Wings	Roisin Murphy	Supporting Role
2024	Celebrity Help! My House Is Haunted	Herself	Reality TV
2026	Kate Expectations	Grace	Leading Role

== Stage credits ==
Year	Title	Role	Notes	Ref
1998	Guiding Stars	Marni	Royal National Theatre	
2005	Break Away	Pauline	Finborough Theatre, London	
2005	The Morris	Lily	Liverpool Everyman	
2009	MeeT ThE DeAN's	Mrs. Dean	Unity Theatre, Liverpool	
2011–2012	Rita, Sue and Bob, Too!	Sue	St Helens Theatre Royal	
2017–2018	Sleeping Beauty	Wicked Queen	Epstein Theatre, Liverpool	
