= BBC Radio Lancashire =

Coordinates: 53.747017°N 2.483042°W

- Blackburn; England
- Broadcast area: Lancashire
- Frequencies: FM: 95.5 MHz (East Lancashire); FM: 103.9 MHz (Winter Hill); FM: 104.5 MHz (Morecambe Bay); DAB: 12A; Freeview: 712
- RDS: BBC Lanc

Programming
- Language: English
- Format: Local news, talk and music

Ownership
- Owner: BBC Local Radio, BBC North West

History
- First air date: 26 January 1971
- Former names: BBC Radio Blackburn (1971–1981); BBC Lancashire
- Former frequencies: 855 MW; 1557 MW

Technical information
- Licensing authority: Ofcom

Links
- Website: www.bbc.co.uk/radiolancashire/

BBC Radio Lancashire is the BBC's local radio station serving the county of Lancashire in England.

Originally launched as BBC Radio Blackburn, it expanded in 1981 to cover the whole county and was renamed BBC Radio Lancashire.

It broadcasts on FM, DAB, digital TV and via BBC Sounds from studios on Darwen Street in Blackburn.

According to RAJAR, the station had a weekly audience of 167,000 listeners in June 2025.

== Technical ==
BBC Radio Lancashire broadcasts on three FM transmitters. The 103.9 FM signal, which covers the central and western parts of the area, comes 529 metres (1,736 ft) high on the Winter Hill transmitter, and its height gives it the greatest coverage over Lancashire. The signal can also be picked up nearby in North Manchester. The station's other FM transmitters cover the eastern part of the county with an additional FM transmitter covering the Morecambe Bay area.

Beginning on 1 October 2001, the DAB signals have come from the EMAP Digital Central Lancashire 12A multiplex located at Winter Hill and Pendle Forest (near Nelson).

The station also broadcasts on Freeview TV channel 712 in the BBC North West region and streams online via BBC Sounds.

Until 17 May 2021, BBC Radio Lancashire was also broadcasting on medium wave.

== Programming ==
Local programming is produced and broadcast from the BBC's Blackburn studios from 6 am to 2 pm on Mondays to Fridays and for sports coverage.

The station usually broadcasts the whole of the Late Night programme, a programme carried by all BBC Local Radio stations (except in the case of sports coverage), which is broadcast between 10pm and 1am.

During the station's downtime, BBC Radio Lancashire simulcasts overnight programming from BBC Radio 5 Live

== Presenters ==
=== Notable former presenters ===
- Allan Beswick
- Jim Bowen
- Gordon Burns
- John Gillmore
- Richard Hammond
- Tony Livesey
- Andy Peebles
- Martin Roberts
- Ted Robbins
- Norman Thomas
