= Diddy TV =

British children's comedy series

- Genre: Comedy; Parody; Slapstick
- Created by: Dick and Dom
- Written by: Andrew Barnet Jones, Tony Cooke and Ciaran Murtagh
- Directed by: Julian Kemp (series 1, 3 and 4); Dez McCarthy (series 2)
- Starring: Richard McCourt; Dominic Wood; Ted Robbins
- Theme music composer: Andy Blythe and Marten Joustra
- Opening theme: "Diddy TV" by Richard McCourt and Dominic Wood
- Ending theme: "Diddy TV" (shortened)
- Composers: Andy Blythe; Marten Joustra
- Country of origin: United Kingdom
- No. of series: 4
- No. of episodes: 40 + 10 shorts

Production
- Executive producer: Annette Williams
- Producer: Steve Ryde
- Editors: Craig Harbour (series 1); Emma Collins (series 2); Jon Dean (series 3 and 4)
- Running time: 14 minutes
- Production company: CBBC Productions

Original release
- Network: CBBC; YouTube (Shorts)
- Release: 14 March 2016 – 20 December 2018

Related
- Diddy Pod; Diddy Dick and Dom

Diddy TV is a British children's sketch comedy series on CBBC. It stars Richard McCourt and Dominic Wood (Dick and Dom). It is a sequel series to the Diddy Dick and Dom sketches on Dick & Dom in da Bungalow and Diddy Movies. The series features various parodies of television series including Top of the Pops and The Great British Bake Off. Series 1 began on 14 March 2016, Series 2 began on 20 June 2016, Series 3 began on 19 March 2018 and Series 4 began on 25 June 2018. Many of the cast have been in other Dick and Dom sketch series or the sitcom The Legend of Dick and Dom.

== Premise ==
The Diddy Movies boss, Larry Weinsteinberger (Bingbongberger from episodes 2 to 8 of season one), filed for bankruptcy due to his movies resulting in catastrophic money loss. But with the last of his money, he quits producing movies and launches a television station for Diddy Dick and Dom on channel 6597423. It parodies shows like Doctor Who, Top of the Pops, Deadly 60, and Countdown. The channel also parodies sports TV and sitcoms, and features adverts starring Dick and Dom.

== Cast ==
- Richard McCourt as Diddy Dick/Various
- Dominic Wood as Diddy Dom/Various
- Ted Robbins as Larry Bingbongberger (formerly Weinsteinberger but changed in the opening theme and edited out of other instances of the name being mentioned throughout the show due to the Harvey Weinstein scandal and was subsequently retired from season 3 onwards)/Various
- Ian Kirkby as DI Harry Batt/Various
- Paris Atkins as Various
- Dave Chapman as Various
- Bob Golding as Various
- Darragh Mortell as Various
- Sabrina Sandhu as Various
- Gail Kemp as Various
- Kate Malyon as Various
- Inel Tomlinson as Various
- Eve Munyanyi as Various
- Louise Woodward as Various

=== Guests ===
The guest stars often appeared between the sketches with Larry Bingbongberger in his house. Some episodes featured Dick and Dom in Da Bungalow character Mr. Choosy. Guests played Diddy versions of themselves (except Reece Shearsmith). In Series 3, new guest stars appeared with Diddy Dick and Dom on Diddy Chat. Some guests featured in more than one episode.

- Reece Shearsmith as Mr. Stockholm
- Ashley Roberts
- Joseph Garrett
- Bruno Tonioli
- Eamonn Holmes
- Barney Harwood
- Hazel Irvine
- Shaun Murphy
- Craig Revel Horwood
- Melvin Odoom
- Jake Mitchell
- Paul Zerdin
- Sally Lindsay
- Radzi Chinyanganya
- Michelle Gayle
- Louis Payne
- Colson Smith
- Lauren Layfield

== Episodes ==
Series	Episodes	Originally released	
Series	Episodes	First released	Last released
1	10	14 March 2016	25 March 2016
2	10	20 June 2016	16 December 2016
3	10	19 March 2018	30 March 2018
4	10	25 June 2018	20 December 2018

=== Series 1 (2016) ===
No. overall	No. in season	Title	Directed by	Written by	Original release date
1	1	"Misty"	Julian Kemp	Tony Cooke, Andrew Jones, Ciaran Murtagh and Steve Ryde	14 March 2016
24 SECONDS IN A&E (parody of 24 Hours in A&E) - Diddy Dick and Diddy Dom try to put a heart back in a body.; Diddy Who (parody of Doctor Who) - Diddy Who tries to defeat the evil Robucket.; Advert: Personal Injury Experts; Diddy Pops (parody of Top of the Pops) (Song: Misty); Bees or no Bees (parody of Deal or No Deal) - Ethel has to choose whether to smear her face in jam or not, before opening a box potentially full of bees.; Diddy Dragons (parody of Dragons' Den) - Corn Flake and Freddie Dweet introduce the Bum Scratcher 3000.; Advert: COLLECTAMUPS; The Belch (parody of The Voice UK) - A contestant burps the alphabet and Will.i.am gets stuck in the ceiling.; Guest: Reece Shearsmith as Mr. Stockholm.
2	2	"Peanuts"	Julian Kemp	Andrew Barnett Jones, Ciaran Murtagh, Tony Cooke and Steve Ryde	15 March 2016
24 SECONDS IN A&E (parody of 24 Hours in A&E) - Diddy Dom tries to fix Diddy Dick's left eye.; Advert: Nuclear Reactor Part Work Magazine = A magazine to build a DIY Nuclear Reactor.; The Box (parody of The Cube) - Raymond has to get all the ketchup out of the bottle without dropping it.; Advert: Save the tigers - Donate £5 to get delivered a Bengal Tiger.; Diddy Pops (parody of Top of the Pops) (Song: The Peanut Vendor); The Dom Show (parody of The One Show) - Auntie Patti shows how to do flower arrangement.; Diddy Dragons (parody of Dragons' Den) - Cornflake and Freddie D'Wheat introduce Poochie: a fragrance made of dog sweat.; Advert: COLLECTAMUPS EXTREEEEMES; The Belch (parody of The Voice UK) - Rock belcher makes the judges' chairs spin.; Guest: Ashley Roberts.
3	3	"Angel"	Julian Kemp	Andrew Barnett Jones, Ciaran Murtagh, Tony Cooke, Steve Ryde, Hannah George and James Whitehouse	16 March 2016
24 SECONDS IN A&E (parody of 24 Hours in A&E) - Diddy Dick and Dom electrocute themselves.; Its a Date (parody of dating shows) - A contestant is made to date an ugly woman by the presenter.; Advert: Water = Perfume made out of water.; Diddypops (parody of Top of the Pops) (Song: Angel); Up Diddy Creak (parody of wildlife shows)- Diddy Dick and Dom are attacked by a tiger.; Diddy Dragons (parody of Dragons' Den) - Corn Flake and Freddie Dweet introduce the iMuck, a smartphone that squirts 'muck' into the user's face if they fail to answer a call.; Advert: COLLECTAMUPS RAINBOW HEARTIKINS; The Belch (parody of The Voice UK) - A Rap belcher makes the judges chairs crazy.; Guest: Joseph Garrett.
4	4	"Let's Face the Music"	Julian Kemp	Andrew Barnett Jones, Ciaran Murtagh, Tony Cooke and Steve Ryde	17 March 2016
24 SECONDS IN A&E (parody of 24 Hours in A&E) - Diddy Dick and Dom try to catch a foot.; Crimediddy (parody of Crimewatch) - Harry Batt tries to catch a furniture thief.; Advert: Diddy Tomato Ketchup; Diddypops (parody of Top of the Pops) (Song: Let's Face the Music and Dance); The Box (parody of The Cube) Raymond has to start a new toilet roll by picking the end of the toilet paper free without tearing it.; I'm not a Celebrity! Get me into there!!! (parody of I'm a Celebrity...Get Me Out of Here!); Brian and Kirk must have a spider on their faces for 20 seconds.: Advert: Granny Catapult; The Belch (parody of The Voice UK) Two contestants burp while the judges join in.; Guest: Reece Shearsmith as Mr. Stockholm.
5	5	"Popcorn"	Julian Kemp	Andrew Barnett Jones, Ciaran Murtagh, Tony Cooke, Steve Ryde, Hannah George, James Whitehouse and Rubie Pomeroy	18 March 2016
The Dom Show (parody of The One Show) Diddy Dom's grandpa shows how to carve a sculpture.; Advert: Nervous Airlines; Robopop (parody of American sitcoms) Robopop throws Jack a birthday party.; Diddypops (parody of Top of the Pops) (Song: Popcorn); Deadily Diddy 60 (parody of Deadly 60) Dick Fearless introduces the Piranha Shark.; Diddymind (parody of Mastermind) Diddy Dick and Dom answer 'bogey' for every question, before being covered in snot. The word 'bogies' is a running gag with the duo, originating in a game on Dick & Dom in da Bungalow.; The Belch (parody of The Voice UK) A contestant can't burp.; Guest: Bruno Tonioli.
6	6	"He Ain't Heavy"	Julian Kemp	Andrew Barnett Jones, Ciaran Murtagh, Tony Cooke and Steve Ryde	21 March 2016
I'm Not a Celebrity! Get me into There!!! (parody of I'm a Celebrity...Get me out of Here!) Brian and Kirk must eat all of the dishes in front of them.; Abracamazing (parody of street magic shows) Swagger and Fitch entertain a man.; Diddypops (parody of Top of the Pops) (Song: He Ain't Heavy, He's My Brother); The Box (parody of The Cube) Raymond must get the 5p coin out from the bottom of the bag.; Advert: Pearly Chimp.; The Diddy Step (parody of The Next Step) Rad tries to join The Tatty TuTu.; Guest: Eamonn Holmes.
7	7	"Saturday Night Suit"	Julian Kemp	Andrew Barnett Jones, Ciaran Murtagh, Steve Ryde, Hannah George and James Whitehouse	22 March 2016
The Dom Show (parody of The One Show) Diddy Dick takes over Dom's show.; Deadily Diddy 60 (parody of Deadly 60) Dick Fearless introduces a Tiger Hedgehog.; Advert: Battle of War; Diddypops (parody of Top of the Pops) (Song: The Johnny Johnson Orchestra - Saturday Night Suit); Diddydown (parody of Countdown) Diddy Dick and Dom try to think of what "FAUFBJELK" means.; The Diddy Step (parody of The Next Step) Chuck tries to get rid of Rad.; Guest: Joseph Garrett.
8	8	"Forever and Ever"	Julian Kemp	Andrew Barnett Jones, Ciaran Murtagh, Steve Ryde, Hannah George and James Whitehouse	23 March 2016
Dispatchorama (parody of Panorama) Featuring a boy with a spoon for a nose.; Advert: Octoberpus; Diddypops (parody of Top of the Pops) (Song: Forever and Ever); Up Diddy Creak (parody of wildlife shows) A gorilla falls in love with Diddy Dom.; Crimediddy (parody of Crimewatch) Harry Batt's parents dress up like him.; The Diddy Step (parody of The Next Step) The crew do the Monster Mash.; Guest: Barney Harwood.
9	9	"Let It Go"	Julian Kemp	Andrew Barnett Jones, Ciaran Murtagh, Steve Ryde and Ben Ward	24 March 2016
World Snooker Champion - Diddy Hazel Irvine and Diddy Shaun Murphy host the final between Juddery Trump and Ronnie O'Notagain.; Advert: Handburger Prince; Diddypops (parody of Top of the Pops) (Song: "Let it Go"); Deadily Diddy 60 (parody of Deadly 60) Diddy Dom's mum punishes Dick Fearless for constantly exposing Dom to dangerous animals.; Advert: Catapult Airlines; Robopop (parody of American sitcoms) Jack and Robopop try to out-prank Suzie.; Post Credits Scene: Ronnie from the earlier snooker sketch has a fit of rage due to not having scored many points. Guests: Bruno Tonioli, Hazel Irvine and Shaun Murphy. Name References: Judd Trump and Ronnie O'Sullivan.
10	10	"That's What You Think"	Julian Kemp	Andrew Barnett Jones, Ciaran Murtagh, Tony Cooke, Steve Ryde, Hannah George and James Whitehouse (previous sketches used)	25 March 2016
The pair look back at some of their greatest ratings hits over their first season on air. Note: This is a compilation episode.

=== Series 2 (2016) ===
No. overall	No. in season	Title	Directed by	Written by	Original release date
11	1	"Breaking Wind"	Dez McCarthy	Andrew Barnett Jones, Ciaran Murtagh, Tony Cooke, Hannah George and James Whitehouse	20 June 2016
The Great British Cake Off (parody of The Great British Bake Off) - The bakers compete to bake the best cake and the losers are crushed by an ice bun.; Advert: Baby Dry; Diddy Brother (parody of Big Brother) - The housemates are given just 30 seconds to eat lunch being catapulted at them by Diddy Dick; Diddy Pops (parody of Top of the Pops) (Song: Breaking Wind); Dickanory (parody of Jackanory) - Diddy Dick reluctantly reads "Timmy and his Magic Pebble" or else Diddy Dom will cover him in jam next to a beehive, whilst making sarcastic comments.; Diddy Roadshow (parody of Antiques Roadshow) - Diddy David Dickinson breaks a vase.; Advert: Toothy Fresh = A 'real life' dentist and a 'real life' person try to sell their toothpaste.; Just for Pranks (parody of hidden camera shows) - The presenters destroy someone’s car as a ‘prank’; Guest: Ashley Roberts
12	2	"Mr Bully"	Dez McCarthy	Andrew Barnett Jones, Ciaran Murtagh, Tony Cooke, Hannah George and James Whitehouse	21 June 2016
The Great British Take Off (parody of The Great British Bake Off) The contestants must propel themselves high in the air and the losers are ejected.; Advert: Zsponge; Downtown Moggy (parody of Downton Abbey) Countess Tiddles Visits Lord Meowthan for lunch.; Diddypops (parody of Top of the Pops) (Song: Yo Mr Bully); Diddy Brother (parody of Big Brother) A housemate talks at length in the diaryroom.; Diddy Roadshow (parody of Antiques Roadshow) Diddy David Dickson breaks a vase.; Surprise Surprise Surprise Surprise (parody of Surprise Surprise) Holly Willough-B and Holly Willough-A upset a woman.
13	3	"Watch More TV"	Dez McCarthy	Andrew Barnett Jones, Ciaran Murtagh, Steve Ryde, Hannah George and James Whitehouse	22 June 2016
The Great British Flake Off (parody off The Great British Bake Off) The scratchers compete to itch the most flakes and the losers are covered in cornflakes.; Advert: Idiot Insurance; Dickanory (parody of Jackanory) Diddy Dick reads 'The Big Red Bucket' while a goblin pours onion gravy on him.; Diddypops (parody of Top of the Pops) (Song:Watch More TV); Chompit (parody of eating contest shows) Diddy Dick and Dom compete to taste monkey pudding.; Strictly Come Booby Trapped (parody of Strictly Come Dancing) Contestants dance the Waltz with booby traps.; Guest: Reece Shearsmith as Mr. Stockholm
14	4	"Don't Be Naughty"	Dez McCarthy	Andrew Barnett Jones, Ciaran Murtagh, Tony Cooke, Hannah George, James Whitehouse and Ben Ward	23 June 2016
Diddy Brother (parody of Big Brother (British TV series)) The contestants are facing eviction tonight.; That Stupid Detective Show (parody of detective shows) A detective tries to figure out who killed a man.; Advert: Learn to Dance; Diddypops (parody of Top of the Pops) (Song:Don't Be Naughty); Diddydown (parody of Countdown) Diddy Dick and Dom try to think of what "OOAUIOEII" means.; Advert: Taj Mahal Part Work Magazine = A magazine for a DIY Taj Mahal.; Surprise Surprise Surprise Surprise (parody of Surprise Surprise) The presenters upset a man by putting a banana in his bag and squashing it.; Guest: Joseph Garrett
15	5	"Starry Pies"	Dez McCarthy	Andrew Barnett Jones, Ciaran Murtagh and Tony Cooke	24 June 2016
You've Been Stupid! (parody of You've Been Framed!); Advert: Silly Burger Wet lap promo; Badgerwatch (parody of Springwatch) Two badgers dance the Hula.; Advert: Now That's What I Call Pneumatic Drills Volume V; Stars in Their Pies (parody of Stars in their Eyes) A contestant performs as a Chicken and Mushroom pie.; Dickanory (parody of Jackanory) Diddy Dick reads Snooty the Kangaroo while Diddy Dom gets a closer eye on him by demonstrating Snooty's actions.; Strictly Come Booby Trapped (parody of Strictly Come Dancing) Contestants dance the Foxtrot with booby traps.; Guest: Bruno Tonioli
16	6	"Mr Choosy"	Dez McCarthy	Andrew Barnett Jones, Ciaran Murtagh, Tony Cooke, Hannah George and James Whitehouse	27 June 2016
Downtown Moggy (parody of Downton Abbey) Houndus starts making a mess in Lord Meowthan's mansion.; Advert: Boing Boing Pants; Diddy Roadshow (parody of Antiques Roadshow) Diddy David Dickson breaks a vase.; Diddypops (parody of Top of the Pops) (Song:Social Media); Guffwatch (parody of Springwatch) The presenters take a look at some 'Guffs'.; Advert: Discombobulate = A board game of craziness.; Surprise Surprise Surprise Surprise (parody of Surprise Surprise) The presenters make a woman happy due to some complaints, but explodes due to being so happy.; Guests: Hazel Irvine and Shaun Murphy
17	7	"Mr Stockholm"	Dez McCarthy	Andrew Barnett Jones, Ciaran Murtagh and Tony Cooke	28 June 2016
Help! My Supply Teacher Is Invisible! (parody of Help! My Supply Teacher's Magic) An invisible teacher confuses some classmates.; Advert: Slapuchino Maker; Downtown Moggy (parody of Downton Abbey) Countess Tiddles is sick and old.; Advert: Trump Player; Stars in Their Pies (parody of Stars in Their Eyes) A contestant performs as a Pumpkin Pie.; Diddy Dragons (parody of Dragon's Den) Corn Flake and Freddie Dweat introduce Chiese, Cheese that connects to wifi.; Strictly Come Booby-Trapped (parody of Strictly Come Dancing) Contestants dance the Cha Cha Cha with booby traps.; Guest: Reece Shearsmith as Mr. Stockholm
18	8	"Don't Be Silly"	Dez McCarthy	Andrew Barnett Jones, Ciaran Murtagh, Tony Cooke, Hannah George and James Whitehouse	29 June 2016
Help My Supply Teacher is a Wizard! (parody of Help! My Supply Teacher's Magic) A wizard transforms the students into frogs, chickens, pumpkins and footballs.; Adverts: Gary Boyfriend My First Album, Make your own Sweets; Diddypops (parody of Top of The Pops) (Song:Don't Be Silly); The Dinkas-Richard Diddyduck finds the Dinkas and betrays them at the end.; Advert:Diddy TV Promo; Diddy or No Diddy (parody of Deal or No Deal) Johnny Obvious opens up some boxes from 1 to 7.; Guest: Barney Harwood
19	9	"Diddy iPlayer"	Dez McCarthy	Andrew Barnett Jones, Ciaran Murtagh, Tony Cooke, Steve Ryde, Hannah George, James Whitehouse and Ben Ward (previous sketches used)	30 June 2016
Diddy Dick and Dom are on duty at Diddy iPlayer HQ ready to play 'on demand' their greatest shows from this series. Note: This is a compilation episode (Parodying the BBC iPlayer)
20	10	"It's Christmas"	Dez McCarthy	Andrew Barnett Jones, Tony Cooke and Ciaran Murtagh	16 December 2016
Master Santa (parody of Masterchef) In part one, Keef and Leanord compete to eat the most mince pies. In part two, Leanord is crowned Master Santa.; Advert: Santa Alarm; Stars in Their Pies (parody of Stars in Their Eyes) A contestant performs as a mince pie for the Christmas Special.; Skeggy and DumbPies (parody of Morecambe and Wise ) - The titular duo dance with a lady.; Strictly Come Booby-Trapped (parody of Strictly Come Dancing) Contestants dance the Tango with booby traps.; Guest: Eamonn Holmes

=== Series 3 (2018) ===
No. overall	No. in season	Title	Directed by	Written by	Original release date
21	1	"Divide and Conquer"	Julian Kemp	Unknown	19 March 2018
Join Diddy TV for a line-up of top entertainment, including The Dimgineers, This is Pointless, Art Viking and a Diddy Chat with Strictly Come Dancing star Craig Revel Horwood. Guest: Craig Revel Horwood
22	2	"Diddy Pooper"	Julian Kemp	Unknown	20 March 2018
Featuring full schedule of Diddy TV that includes Ninja Diddy Worriers, live coverage of The World Bundle Championship, and a new series of Bottom Gear looking at some of the best pants on the market.
23	3	"Zingy Diddy Sauce"	Julian Kemp	Unknown	21 March 2018
Settle in for Diddy Chat, high-diving reality challenge show Splosh, and action-packed adventure with the Mighty Useless Clunking Robots. Guest: Melvin Odoom
24	4	"Jam Bag"	Julian Kemp	Unknown	22 March 2018
Featuring Kiss Chase with your host Badly Washed, The Art Viking shows us how to make balloon models, and YouTube sensation Jake Mitchell is on the sofa for Diddy Chat. Guest: Jake Mitchell
25	5	"Hairy Diddies"	Julian Kemp	Unknown	23 March 2018
Join the Hairy Diddies in the kitchen and see if they can pass their public health inspection. It's laundry day for the Mighty Useless Clunking Robots and Bottom Gear features a star in a reasonably priced pair of pants. Guests: Radzi Chingyanganya and Paul Zerdin (with Sam)
26	6	"Games Bunker"	Julian Kemp	Unknown	26 March 2018
The hosts take on the role of airline pilots in I'm Not Really A..., Aunty meets her match in The Kiss Chase, and actor Sally Lindsay is the star guest on Diddy Chat. Guest: Sally Lindsay
27	7	"Hot Gadgetz"	Julian Kemp	Unknown	27 March 2018
Featuring the show that looks at some of the hottest new technology around – it's Hot Gadgetz. Guest: Radzi Chinyanganya
28	8	"The Diddy Choir"	Julian Kemp	Unknown	28 March 2018
Two top nurseries clash in a battle of IQs in Nursery Challenge. The quest to get the nation singing again continues in The Diddy Choir, and Wolfblood and EastEnders actor Michelle Gayle is Diddy Dick and Dom's guest in Diddy Chat. Guests: Craig Revel Horwood and Michelle Gayle
29	9	"The Answer is Always Sausage"	Julian Kemp	Unknown	29 March 2018
Diddy Dom explores his past on a pogo stick in Great Pogo Stick Journeys, it's the grand finale of celebrity diving show Splosh, and will someone win the jackpot in TV's easiest game show, The Answer is Always Sausage? Guest: Craig Revel Horwood
30	10	"Top Diddy TV Moments"	Julian Kemp	Unknown	30 March 2018
Join us for the countdown as the stars of stage and screen reflect on the top seven and a half Diddy TV moments of all time. Guest: Craig Revel Horwood Note: This is a compilation episode.

=== Series 4 (2018) ===
No. overall	No. in season	Title	Directed by	Written by	Original release date
31	1	"EuroDiddy"	Julian Kemp	Unknown	25 June 2018
It's the annual EuroDiddy Song Contest. Also, there's a new episode of Worrying Mum and Dad. Guests: Michelle Gayle and Melvin Odoom
32	2	"Call the Didwife"	Julian Kemp	Unknown	26 June 2018
Featuring heartwarming drama Call the Didwife and the staff at the local sewage works learn to sing. Guests: Michelle Gayle, Sally Lindsay and Louis Payne
33	3	"The World's Strongest Diddy"	Julian Kemp	Unknown	27 June 2018
Love blossoms Diddy-style in First Dates and we discover that Vets Do the Funniest Things. Guest: Sally Lindsay
34	4	"Vote for Me"	Julian Kemp	Unknown	28 June 2018
It's election night on Diddy TV and laugh at some extraordinary ailments in Your Hilarious Illnesses. Guest: Radzi Chingyanganya
35	5	"Singing Hospital"	Julian Kemp	Unknown	29 June 2018
Featuring a hospital where the doctors rely on the power of song to cure the patients. Guests: Craig Revel Horwood, Jake Mitchell and Paul Zerdin (with Sam)
36	6	"Whiffwang"	Julian Kemp	Unknown	2 July 2018
Diddy TV proudly presents Total Total Wipeout - a show unlike any other. Guest: Colson Smith
37	7	"Eggyheads"	Julian Kemp	Unknown	3 July 2018
Quiz shows turn bad in Eggyheads and CBBC's Lauren Layfield is lightly grilled by Diddy Dick and Dom in Diddy Chat. Guest: Lauren Layfield
38	8	"Don't Touch the Box"	Julian Kemp	Unknown	4 July 2018
Diddy TV proudly presents a brand new medieval entertainment show, Strictly Come Lancing. Guests: Craig Revel Horwood and Michelle Gayle
39	9	"Big Chin Day"	Julian Kemp	Unknown	5 July 2018
It's Diddy TV's very own charity evening which gives a look back at some of the great television from this series. Guests: Craig Revel Horwood and Michelle Gayle Note: This is a compilation episode.
40	10	"A Very Diddy Christmas"	Julian Kemp	Andrew Barnett Jones; Tony Cooke; Ciaran Murtagh	20 December 2018
Christmas is coming, and Diddy TV presents its very own festive line-up: Panel Beaters Christmas special, Kirsty Allsort’s perfect Christmas and a Santa sack full of adverts!

=== Shorts (2016–17) ===
A series of shorts were uploaded on to CBBC's website and YouTube channel. Some are Diddy Chat, where Diddy Dick and Dom interview a celebrity. Others are parodies of popular Internet videos, such as Unboxings and Carpool Karaoke.

No.	Title	Original release date
1	"Diddy Chat: Joe and Jake"	6 May 2016
Diddy Dick & Dom chat to the UK Eurovision hopefuls Joe and Jake ahead of the 2016 Eurovision Song Contest. Guests: Joe and Jake
2	"Tasty Treat Tutorial"	20 May 2016
A parody of YouTube tutorials where Diddy Dick and Dom show you how to make a tasty treat.
3	"Mystery Box Unboxing"	27 May 2016
A parody of YouTube unboxing videos where Diddy Dick and Dom are unboxing a mystery package. What's inside?
4	"Diddy Carpool Karaoke Gone Wrong!"	27 May 2016
A parody of Carpool Karaoke from The Late Late Show with James Corden videos where Diddy Dom takes a lookalike of Adele on a drive for some karaoke but soon realises that it was a bad idea.
5	"Make-up Vlog with Diddy Dick and Dom"	1 June 2016
A parody of YouTube make-up and fashion videos where Diddy Dick has a go at doing Diddy Dom's make-up.
6	"Beyoncé Carpool Karaoke Spoof"	3 June 2016
Another parody of Carpool Karaoke from The Late Late Show with James Corden sees Diddy Dom unsuccessfully impressing "Beyoncé" with his playlist of her songs.
7	"Rita Ora Needs a Wee"	7 June 2016
A parody of Carpool Karaoke from The Late Late Show with James Corden videos where Rita Ora (or someone that claims to be Rita) tries to make it to the toilet in time.
8	"Diddy Chat: Louis Payne"	26 September 2016
Louis Payne (TJ) reveals some Wolfblood 'secrets' in this exclusive funny interview with Diddy Dick and Dom for Diddy TV! Guest: Louis Payne
9	"Diddy Chat: Lauren Layfield"	18 November 2016
Presenter Lauren Layfield joins Diddy Dick and Dom to chat about brand new The Dengineers series 2 and shows off a few of her special talents! Guest: Lauren Layfield
10	"Diddy Chat: Colson Smith"	16 January 2017
Diddy Dick and Dom join Colson Smith from Coronation Street. Guest: Colson Smith

== Release ==
Series 1 began on 14 March 2016 and ended on 25 March 2016. Series 2 began on 20 June 2016 and ended on 30 June 2016. There was a Christmas special on 16 December 2016, and another one on 20 December 2018.

Series 3 started on 19 March 2018 and ended on 31 March 2018. Series 4 started on 25 June 2018 and ended on 5 July 2018.

Every episode was available to purchase on the BBC Store. The last episode to be aired was Series 4's Christmas special episode, which aired on 25 December 2023.
