= Tiny and Mr Duk =

- Starring: Dave Chapman; Damian Farrell
- Country of origin: United Kingdom
- No. of series: 1

Original release
- Network: BBC One

Related
- The Saturday Show; Dick and Dom in Da Bungalow

Tiny and Mr Duk are two puppet characters created for UK children's TV show, The Saturday Show by Dave Chapman and Damian Farrell.

== Story ==
Tiny is a giant hamster, created in an accident in a laboratory. Mr Duk is a duck who acts as Tiny's agent, although this setup was referred to less and less as the characters evolved.

This backstory was covered in a short video clip shown at the start of their segments on The Saturday Show during their first few months, but was dropped when they became established characters in their own right.

== Humour ==
Most of the humour on the Tiny and Mr Duk segments was very surreal. For example, Tiny at one stage took to making short films with a pack of chorizos on peasticks, called "The Sausage Family", which would invariably end with one or more members of the family being eaten by a dog. They also regularly featured a video clip of a character named "Cherry Bakewell" – a man (played by Chapman) in a red velvet jacket, tight black trousers and ridiculously long pointy shoes who had a giant cherry bakewell tart in place of a head. He would be egged on by the studio to unleash mayhem in public. During their time on The Saturday Show, the characters also took part in some of the games, such as "Pot Shots" where they dressed as stereotypical Mexican bandits with velcro patches, and tried to dodge felt balls being fired at them by Joe Mace.

== Spin off ==
In 2003, a pilot was filmed for what eventually became Tiny and Mr Duk's Huge Show. The pilot featured a different set of guests in two halves of the show, including Reggie Yates, Joe Pasquale, Kirsten O'Brien and Jade Goody.
