= Darragh Mortell =

British actor (born 1989)

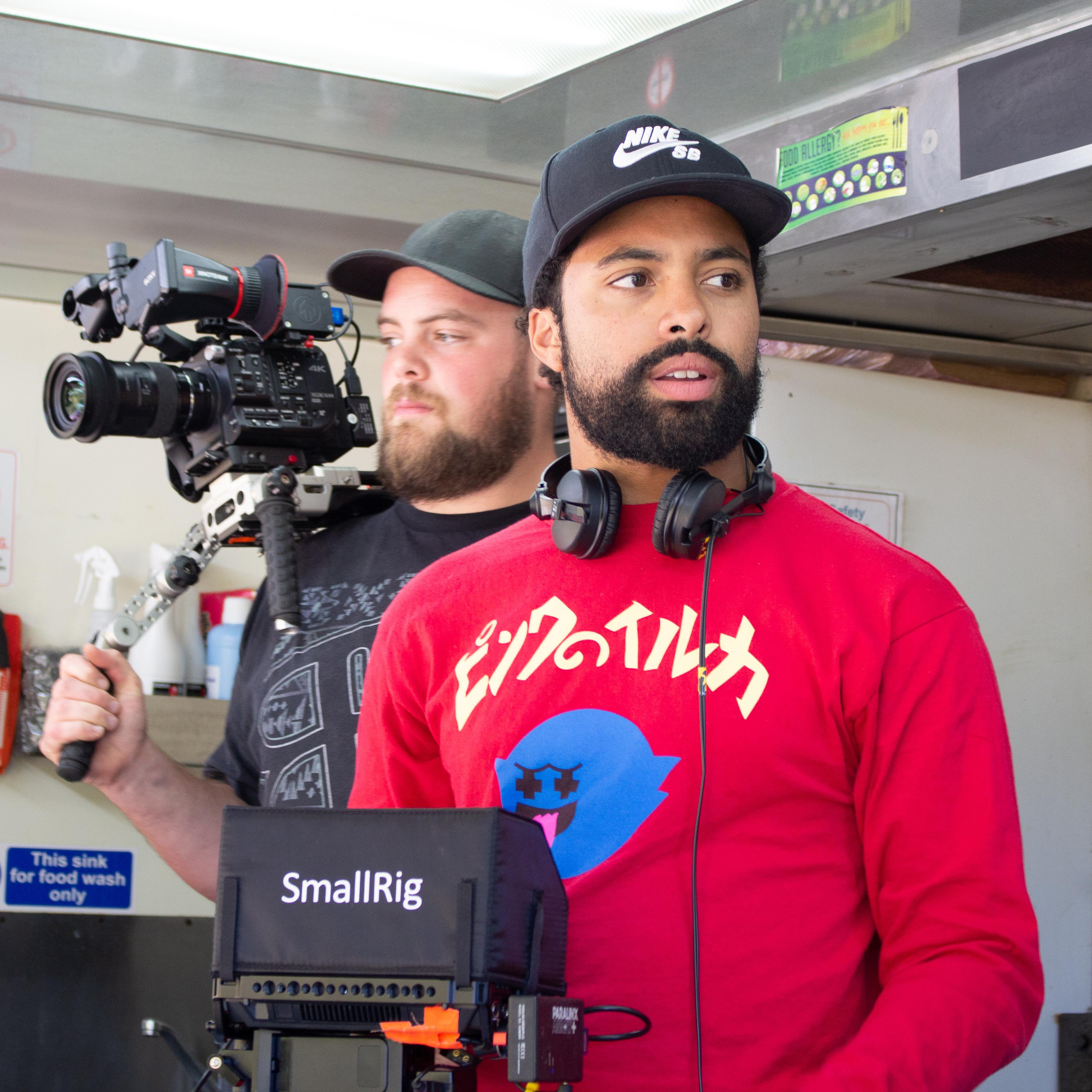
- Directing on set of BBC2 comedy Halfway
- Born: Darragh Desmond Mortell; 23 June 1989 (age 37); Newport, Wales
- Occupations: Actor, writer, director
- Years active: 2003–present

Darragh Desmond Mortell (born 23 June 1989) is a Welsh actor, writer, and director of television, radio and film. He began his career in children's television, starring in television shows such as Diddy Movies, Dani's House, Diddy TV and most notably, The Story of Tracy Beaker. He also appeared as the guest lead in the final episodes of The Bill as well as groundbreaking interactive drama Dubplate Drama, DCI Banks and Hollyoaks Later.

Mortell's debut short film as a writer and director, Peep Dish (2015), won the Best Experimental Short Film prize at the London Independent Film Festival. His second, Donald Mohammed Trump, starring Asim Chaudhry and Holli Dempsey, garnered international praise and a screening at London's BFI Southbank.

In 2020, Darragh won 'Best European Fiction' at the Prix Europa Awards for his BBC Radio Wales / BBC Radio 4 afternoon play I am Kanye West. The play explores the themes of identity, celebrity obsession and mental health, themes that arise often in Darragh's work. In the same year, he served as Second Unit Director for the Mark Rylance-led feature film The Fantastic Flitcrofts, slated for a 2021 release.

Mortell is a proud Welshman of Irish and Zimbabwean heritage and cites the notion of existing between two worlds as inspiration for many of his works. He is represented by London-based talent agency Curtis Brown.
