= Your Mother Wouldn't Like It =

British children's television series (1985–1988)

- Starring: Ian Kirkby; Paul Stark; Tom Anderson; Philip Wombwell; Karen Murden; Christina Norris; Steven Ryde; Simon Schatzberger; Karl Collins; Pui Fan Lee; Tayla Goodman
- Country of origin: United Kingdom

Production
- Running time: 30 minutes

Original release
- Network: ITV (CITV)

Your Mother Wouldn't Like It was a children's sketch show broadcast on ITV between 1985 and 1988. A unique aspect of the show was that the performing cast were almost entirely children.

The show was produced by Central Television at their Lenton Lane studios in Nottingham. The children used on the show were part of the Central Junior Television Workshop, an initiative founded by Central Television. The show won a BAFTA award but has never been issued on DVD.

== Overview ==
It is thought that a TV producer asked members of the Central Junior Television Workshop what type of show they would like to make, and the majority decision was comedy.

The first series of Your Mother Wouldn't Like It were mainly based on the conceit of a few of the children—Loaf, Lonnie, Cans, Mary Rose and Pam—running and writing the show itself, interspersed with sketches. The second and third series did away with most of this narrative, but retained Loaf as an essential linking device.

Loaf (played by Ian Kirkby) was a dogsbody character, with Cans (Tom Anderson) as the main boss to everyone. A puppet worm—named Tapeworm—would interrupt proceedings now and then with a sneery comment. In the last episode, it was revealed to the audience that Loaf was the puppeteer and voice behind Tapeworm, although the puppet's voice really belonged to performer Karl Collins throughout the show's life. The second series introduced Richard Allenson playing the part of Mr. Briefcase, the sneering man from the Ministry of Wholesome Television who repeatedly tried to close down the show and invariably ended up failing. Richard Allenson went on to create the character Professor McGinty, a time-travelling detective who tours the country with his mobile museum.

Loaf's mother (also played by Kirkby) was added in the third series. This character would interact with Loaf and the presenters, and served tea to the actors during the teabreak that replaced the "Ad Attack" (parodies of then current commercials) segment from the first two series.

Familiar concepts from anarchic children's programmes were present, such as slapstick humour featuring custard pies and gunge as visual punchlines, and a healthy disrespect towards authority. Each episode of series two and three was hosted by a guest presenter from other children's programmes. These were all played by one of the young actors in the cast, and included parodies of Timmy Mallett, Cannon and Ball, Grotbags, Jimmy Cricket, Cilla Black, Mr. T, Bonnie Langford and the presenters of Splash!. In one episode the guest presenter was David Bellamy and he was played by a different child actor each time he appeared.

There were roughly 100 members in the Central Junior Television Workshop, which was split into two branches, one based in Birmingham, the other based in Nottingham. With a wide range of talent, different kids could be focused on each week for their own comedy routines. Impressions were quite popular, as were parodies of television programmes of the time.

== Regular sketches ==
Some of the regular sketches are detailed below.

=== Palace Hill ===
Palace Hill was a spoof of the BBC's long-running children's drama Grange Hill with characters based on members of the British royal family. Introduced in the second series, it returned in series 3 under the title "Return to Palace Hill". This proved so popular that it became a spin-off show, also broadcast on ITV, running for three series, and targeted politicians such as Margaret Thatcher for satire.

The spin-off show had a surreal, almost post-apocalyptic feel to it. The characters, such as school bully Nick Knuckle and his girlfriend Binky Spoon, spent their time roaming the seemingly-abandoned corridors of the school, often stopping to address the camera directly. The character based on Prince Charles had a doomed love affair with a girl from another planet, who eventually went back to her home planet. There was also a character who was a schoolboy from the WW2 era.

=== The Wimp Reports ===
The Wimp was a socially inadequate and unpopular character, played by Simon Schatzberger, who would investigate a different youth trend each week, only to be humiliated by his peers. The sketches were written by Sue Townsend, best known as author and creator of the Adrian Mole books. Only appeared in series 1.

=== Twee Man, Disaster of the Universe ===
A parody of American action cartoon He-Man and the Masters of the Universe but played in 'real life' by costumed actors on the more realistic (and cheaper) setting of present-day Earth. As the title suggests, Twee-Man is a more cowardly and feeble version of He-Man who would face his arch enemy Toilet Door (a parody of Skeletor) each time while a chorus (visible on screen) sings his name and various variations depending upon the situation.

=== Sharon, Karen, Darrin and Gary ===
Four friends meet in a different location each time and talk about life, leading to various misunderstanding. Gary never interacts with the others, but listens to his headphones instead. A muffled version of the Bucks Fizz song The Land of Make Believe can usually be heard coming from Gary's headphones. Only appeared in series 2.

== Cast ==
Among the cast were Steven Ryde, who went on to produce Dick and Dom in da Bungalow for the BBC, Ian Kirkby, who also performed on Dick and Dom in da Bungalow, and Karen Murden, who went on to play Beverly Grice in the ITV soap opera Crossroads. Tayla Goodman went on to write the rock musical Virus, which had its world premiere at Nottingham's Theatre Royal, and is currently writing a film script, The Edge Of Goodbye, with her business partner Peter Everett.

== Transmission guide ==
- Series 1: 7 editions from 8 November 1985 – 20 December 1985
- Series 2: 7 editions from 22 August 1986 – 3 October 1986
- Series 3: 7 editions from 18 November 1987 – 13 January 1988
