= Wendy van der Plank =

English actress

- Born: Wendy Alison van der Plank
- Occupation: Actress
- Years active: 1980s–present (stage); 1988–1995 (television)
- Known for: Wizadora
- Notable work: Forever Green (1989–92); Wizadora (1993–96)

Wendy Alison van der Plank is an English actress. She played the title role in the ITV children's series Wizadora and the role of 'Hilly' in the ITV drama series Forever Green.

== Career ==
Van der Plank's first television appearance was in the BBC comedy series Spin Off. After appearing in one episode of Casualty, she played the role of Hilly in the ITV drama Forever Green.

She was the titular character in the CITV series, Wizadora, originally based on the six-part 1991 German SWR series of the same name. Van der Plank played the role for the majority of its run, before being replaced with actress Lizzie McPhee.

She appeared as Sharon in the radio sitcom All That Jazz, in which the creator commented that he was "...knocked out by Wendy van der Plank", and that "She'd never done any radio before and was largely unknown, but she came close to stealing the show. She really threw herself into it and I thought she was hilarious... She was just great!".

She has also appeared in various theatrical shows, including The King and I in 1987, and Quasimodo the Hunchback of Notre Dame in 1988, both at the Queen's Theatre in Hornchurch.

She works for the Boiling Kettle Theatre Company in Devon.

== Selected filmography ==
Year	Title	Role	Notes
1988–89	Spin Off	Charlie Mabey	Series 1, episodes 17, 18 & 25
1989–92	Forever Green	Hilly	Series 1–2 (main role, 18 episodes)
1989	Casualty	Rosie	Series 4, episode 6
1990	The Bill	Tina Benskin	Series 6, episode 16
1993–96	Wizadora	Wizadora	Series 1–5 (main role)
1995	The Vet	Pamela Mullholland	Series 1, episodes 3 & 4
