= Dave Chapman (actor) =

English actor, presenter, puppeteer and voice artist (born 1973)

David Chapman (born 9 June 1973) is an English actor, presenter, puppeteer and voice artist.

== Career ==
Chapman trained at the London Academy of Music and Dramatic Art (LAMDA), graduating 1992, and The Jim Henson Company, April, 1994 at Jim Henson's creature shop, Camden. His puppeteering work has featured in the films Muppet Treasure Island, 101 Dalmatians (Walt Disney Company, 1996), My Last Five Girlfriends (Paramount), Ridley Scott's Prometheus (20th Century Fox), and Muppets Most Wanted (Disney, 2014). On TV, his puppeteering work has featured in Wizards vs Aliens, Captain Abercromby, Carrie and David's Popshop, Children in Need, Doctor Who, French and Saunders, Heroes of Comedy: Max Miller, The Saturday Show, Shooting Stars, Sport Relief, Time Trumpet, Tiny and Mr. Duk's Huge Show, What's Up Doc?, Nuzzle and Scratch, Xchange, The X Factor and on Jim Henson Company's Pajanimals.

He has had a long association with CBBC, first working as the writer, puppeteer, toast and voice artist for Otis the Aardvark between 1994 and 1999. It was in this role that he first worked with children's presenters Richard McCourt and Dominic Wood ("Dick & Dom"), prior to featuring in the BAFTA and RTS award-winning Dick & Dom in da Bungalow. Between 2002 and 2006, Chapman played numerous characters alongside other Bungalow regulars Ian Kirkby, Melvin Odoom and Lee Barnett.

Chapman's other characters include Scratch in CBeebies show Nuzzle and Scratch, Vinnie the Ferret in CBBC's Xchange, Matt Lucas' Singing Potatoes in Shooting Stars, Tiny the Giant Hamster in The Saturday Show and Tiny and Mr Duk's Huge Show, Riff the dog in Carrie and David's Popshop and Windy the rat in Space Pirates.

Chapman played bad ventriloquist Peter Nokio in four series of The Slammer. Additionally, he played the villain Alan Draylon in Harry Batt, both for CBBC. He has also appeared as himself on three episodes of Rob Brydon's Annually Retentive and has guested on The Chris Evans Show, The Chris Moyles Show and Kiss Breakfast. His voice work includes The Mimic, Jamie's American Road Trip, Strictly:It takes Two, School of Silence and Casualty Revealed, and his commercial work includes voices for Sandisc, Cadburys, Sony, BBC3, The Times newspaper, Seat, and Citibank.

In 2001, he wrote and co-directed the short film Dinner Money. He also writes and performs live comedy in the double act Chapman and Crompton.

Chapman hosted the gameshow And Then You Die on Dave as the puppet character Barrie Stardust. He has also played over sixty characters including series villain The Beastmaster in the CBBC sitcom The Legend of Dick and Dom. He has also hosted Undercover Dads! for CBBC on BBC Two, which was nominated for a BAFTA Award in 2010.

Chapman played Dougie Colon, Eddie Watts, Dad and Josh in the Jim Henson Company and BBC co-production That Puppet Game Show. He also joined Brian Henson on stage for Brian Henson's Evolution of Puppetry lectures at the 2013 Edinburgh Festival and guested in the Henson Alternative improv show "Puppet Up!".

He has also co-written a children's book with Dick and Dom, which he illustrated. Entitled Dick and Dom's Slightly Naughty but Very Silly Words, it was published by Macmillan in the autumn of 2013.

In June 2014, Chapman was one of the puppeteers performing BB-8 in Star Wars: The Force Awakens alongside Brian Herring and Matt Denton. He has since performed characters for Rogue One, The Last Jedi, and The Rise of Skywalker, (as BB-8, BB-9E, performing and voicing Thamm, the Canto Bight croupier, and assistant Yoda puppeteer with Damian Farrell and Colin Purves to Frank Oz). Chapman also served as lead performer for Lady Proxima and Rio Durant in Solo: A Star Wars Story. He puppeteers Emperor skekSo, Gurjin, and Ordon in The Dark Crystal: Age of Resistance and The Fly in Quentin Dupieux's French comedy Mandibles. Chapman also performed and voiced B2EMO in Andor. In 2024 he was a puppeteer on the Netflix series Eric and an Animatronics FX puppeteer on Tim Burton's Beetlejuice Beetlejuice

One of his more recent works is Stanley the Monster in Saturday Mash-Up!
