= Harry Batt =

- Dick and Dom in Da Bungalow character
- Created by: Steve Ryde
- Portrayed by: Ian Kirkby

In-universe information
- Occupation: Detective Inspector
- Origin: Newcastle upon Tyne, England

DI Harry Batt is a fictional policeman portrayed by Ian Kirkby. First appearing as a supporting character in Dick and Dom in Da Bungalow, he later appeared as the main protagonist in a spinoff pilot titled Harry Batt.

== Dick and Dom in da Bungalow ==
Harry Batt first appeared on Dick and Dom in da Bungalow in 2004, at the beginning of the show's fourth series. His main reason for coming to Da Bungalow was to punish presenter Dominic Wood after it was learned that Wood had cheated in a game of That's The Stuff, on which Dom had replaced a jar of garlic mayonnaise with yoghurt. Harry forced Wood to eat the garlic mayonnaise on live TV as a punishment.

=== Games ===
Harry Batt devised two games during his appearances, both of which were shown during the last series of the show.

==== "Nae Body Move" ====
This game was first played on 10 September 2005 during the first episode of the fifth season of The Bungalow. It took place in the back garden of the Bungalow on Saturday mornings.

The bungalowheads have to dress themselves as DI Harry Batt, using the items provided. Harry has his back turned to the Bungalowheads. They have to move closer and closer towards him, dressing themselves as they go. At random moments, Harry turns round sharply, shouting "Nae Body Move!" If he catches one of the Bungalow heads moving, they are out of the game. The first person to reach the end of the course and shout the given statement, wins the game. This statement was "Nae Body Move!" followed by SOMETHING "Squad" (e.g. "NAE BODY MOVE! CARROT SQUAD!) The winner was awarded with Bungalow points.

The first Bungalow head to shout "Nae Body Move" followed by a squad name, won the game. Some of the different squads were: Carrot Squad (10 September), Blanket Squad, and Bee Squad.

The first game of "Nae Body Move" began with DI Harry Batt appearing through the compost heap. Celebrity Rachel Stevens lost her moustache. In the end, the game was ended as the cast broke down with laughter.

There was a variant called "Nae Buzzy Move" where Harry Batt dressed up a bumble bee. The Bungalow heads had to dress up as bees instead of the inspector. Harry Batt's two brothers (Larry and Barry Batt) both appeared, dressed in bee costumes

==== DI Harry Batt's interrogation game ====
This was a game in which the chosen bungalowhead was "taken down the station for a bit of interrogation". In this game the scene was that of a typical police interrogation, the bungalowhead had a secret word, given to them by Dick and Dom. Harry then had ninety seconds to ask them some questions. While being asked these questions the bungalowhead had to say the word as many times as possible, without Harry being able to guess the secret word. When ninety seconds was up, he attempted to guess the secret word. If he got it right, the bungalowhead lost all their bungalow points. If he got it wrong, the bungalowhead gained 20 bungalow points for each time they said the word.

== Harry Batt TV pilot ==
Harry Batt
- Starring: Ian Kirkby, Melvin Odoom, Dave Chapman, Dominic Wood, Richard McCourt, Eliza Power.
- Country of origin: United Kingdom
- No. of episodes: 1

Production
- Running time: approx. 25 min

Original release
- Network: BBC One (first showing), CBBC Channel (repeat)
- Release: 12 January 2007

On 12 January 2007 at 5:00pm (GMT), Harry Batt appeared the first show of his long-awaited series, as part of Gina's Laughing Gear on CBBC1. The show is written by Kirkby, Chapman, Steve Ryde and Julian Kemp. Also appearing on the show are Chapman, Melvin Odoom and Lee Barnett, who have also appeared with Kirkby in Dick and Dom in da Bungalow and The Slammer.

It is produced by Ryde, who also produced Dick and Dom in da Bungalow and The Slammer.

=== Episode 1 ===
Episode 1 was aired on BBC One - Friday, 12 January 2007 at 5:00pm (GMT) and then Repeated - CBBC Channel - Saturday, 13 January 2007 at 6:30pm (GMT). It shows DI Harry Batt attempting to stop a spate of illegal sofa bouncing.

== Subsequent appearances ==
Harry Batt appeared with another Geordie copper (played by Dave Chapman) in The Legend of Dick and Dom episode 'The Mists of Time' when Princes Dick and Dom find themselves in modern-day Sluff (Slough). Harry Batt is hypnotised by Mannitol into thinking he is a showgirl, He also reprised a similar role in a later episode where he plays Sheriff Harold Batt who arrests the main characters before trying to intercept their evil clones during the "Fairest Fairy Fayre".

Harry Batt briefly appeared on the CBBC channel to celebrate the anniversary of Dick and Dom in da Bungalow alongside Dick and Dom.
