= Simon Schatzberger =

English actor (born 1968)

- Born: 1968 (age 57–58); Nottingham, England
- Occupation: Actor
- Television: Band of Brothers; EastEnders; Doctors; Audrey and Friends (Pilot) (2000)

Simon Schatzberger (born 1968) is an English actor, known for his role as David Klarfeld on the BBC soap opera Doctors and for appearing in the well-known "French Polisher" TV advert for Yellow Pages in the 1990s.

== Career ==
Schatzberger has appeared on several television programmes in both guest roles and starring roles, including Six Pairs of Pants, Your Mother Wouldn't Like It, Press Gang, Audrey and Friends, "Comin' Atcha!", Band of Brothers, Black Books, Doctors and The Cottage. He also appeared in two episodes of EastEnders, as a Rabbi, in December 2018 and again for one further episode in January 2019. In 2020, Schatzberger played Alan Filchett in "The Folly of Jephthah" (series 8, episode 5 of Father Brown), and began the role of David Klarfeld on the BBC soap opera Doctors.
