= Forever Green =

1989 British TV drama

- Genre: Family drama
- Written by: Douglas Watkinson; Jeremy Paul
- Directed by: David Giles (6 episodes, 1989); Sarah Hellings (6 episodes, 1991); Christopher King (6 episodes, 1992)
- Starring: John Alderton; Pauline Collins; Daisy Bates; Nimer Rashed; Wendy van der Plank; Paola Dionisotti
- Opening theme: Patrick Gowers
- Composer: Patrick Gowers
- Country of origin: United Kingdom
- Original language: English
- No. of series: 2
- No. of episodes: 18

Production
- Producers: Brian Eastman; Nick Elliot
- Cinematography: Dick Pope; Peter Greenhalgh; Paul Bond
- Editors: Neil Thomson; Charles Rees
- Running time: 50 minutes
- Production companies: Carnival Films; LWT

Original release
- Network: ITV
- Release: 26 February 1989 – 24 May 1992

Forever Green is a television drama originally broadcast on ITV in the United Kingdom from 26 February 1989 to 24 May 1992. It was made for LWT by Picture Partnership Productions, now named Carnival Films.

== Plot ==
Jack, a former racing driver, and Harriet Boult, a nurse, live in a London flat with their two children, Frederica (Freddy) and Tom. Freddy has asthma, which Harriet believes could be due to the city pollution, and after a serious attack begins to think leaving the city could be the best treatment available. Soon after, a letter arrives advising Harriet of an inheritance from one of her old patients, a run-down house in the country. It only takes one visit to persuade them to move.

The 18 episodes contain plots dealing with their adapting to life in the country and touches on environmental themes, alternative healing and alternative lifestyle choices.

== Cast ==
- Pauline Collins - Harriet Boult
- John Alderton - Jack Boult
- Daisy Bates - Freddy Boult
- Nimer Rashed - Tom Boult
- Paola Dionisotti - Lady Patricia Broughall
- Wendy van der Plank - Hilly
- Alan Rowe - Geoff Bate
- Ian Lindsay - Ted Hubbard

== Episodes ==
Series	Episodes	Originally released	
Series	Episodes	First released	Last released
1	6	26 February 1989	2 April 1989
2	12	8 March 1992	24 May 1992

=== Series 1 (1989) ===
No. overall	No. in series	Title	Directed by	Written by	Original release date
1	1	"Episode 1"	David Giles	Terence Brady, Charlotte Bingham	26 February 1989
Freddy's asthma is getting worse and Harriet suspects city life might be the cause. A lucky inheritance makes an escape to the country a possibility but can they really just go?
2	2	"Episode 2"	David Giles	Terence Brady, Charlotte Bingham	5 March 1989
The Boult family is upset by the rural pastime of badger baiting. Freddy has a severe attack of asthma. But what can they do? Jack realises there's a way he can settle the score - using his skills at the wheel of a car.
3	3	"Episode 3"	David Giles	Terence Brady, Charlotte Bingham	12 March 1989
Jack comes across some horse rustlers and Freddy is hit by a new asthma attack, the Boults also discover more about Hilly. Maybe she is sitting on some hidden assets which could be worth a lot of money.
4	4	"Episode 4"	David Giles	Terence Brady, Charlotte Bingham	19 March 1989
Jack is late home after a hippy convoy blocks the local roads. Harriet and Hilly find the travelling life attractive and discover some secrets in Jack's past.
5	5	"Episode 5"	David Giles	Terence Brady, Charlotte Bingham	26 March 1989
The Boult family is struck with headaches and ulcers. Only Freddy seems immune.
6	6	"Episode 6"	David Giles	Terence Brady, Charlotte Bingham	2 April 1989
A day trip to London for Harriet, Freddy and Tom serves to reinforce the joys of Meadows Green Farm. But Hilly's musical talents bring a twist of fate to Freddy's apparent return to health.

=== Series 2 (1992) ===
No. overall	No. in series	Title	Directed by	Written by	Original release date
7	1	"Episode 1"	Sarah Hellings	Douglas Watkinson	8 March 1992
Freddy is studying for her GCSEs, Harriet hopes to qualify for Shiatsu massage and Jack has his own test.
8	2	"Episode 2"	Sarah Hellings	Douglas Watkinson	15 March 1992
Hilly and her animals invade the Boults' house, but their arrival coincides with a pair of barn owls who are brought to nest in a nearby barn. Suddenly, the place seems overcrowded.
9	3	"Episode 3"	Sarah Hellings	Douglas Watkinson	22 March 1992
Freddy decides to find out what has caused the local river to be unable to support much wildlife anymore.
10	4	"Episode 4"	Sarah Hellings	Douglas Watkinson	29 March 1992
Lady Pat organises a walk to keep local footpaths open.
11	5	"Episode 5"	Sarah Hellings	Douglas Watkinson	5 April 1992
Jack and Harriet are at odds over plans to convert a barn into flats.
12	6	"Episode 6"	Sarah Hellings	Douglas Watkinson	12 April 1992
Freddy and Hilly get to show their riding skills at the Oaksey races.
13	7	"Episode 7"	Christopher King	Jeremy Paul	19 April 1992
Freddy's local history project uncovers a mystery surrounding the ownership of Meadows Green Farm.
14	8	"Episode 8"	Christopher King	Douglas Watkinson	26 April 1992
The Boults find a skeleton in their garden, a poltergeist in their house, and Freddy discovers a talent for automatic writing.
15	9	"Episode 9"	Christopher King	Douglas Watkinson, Jeremy Paul	3 May 1992
Jack and Harriet are tempted to move to Wales, while Freddy discovers that Lord Corwen plans to hold a hare coursing meet.
16	10	"Episode 10"	Christopher King	Douglas Watkinson	10 May 1992
A mysterious Polish stranger and a majestic rogue stag arrive on Lady Broughall's estate.
17	11	"Episode 11"	Christopher King	Douglas Watkinson	17 May 1992
Harriet's reluctance to talk about her deceased father is challenged when Ellen, his companion in his final years, turns up.
18	12	"Episode 12"	Christopher King	Douglas Watkinson	24 May 1992
Ted needs a new barn and Freddy has an idea about how to build one. But someone is determined to burn it down. And is there room for a fox hunter and a fox enthusiast in the same family?

== Production ==
The exact location of the house is at Tunley, two miles southeast of Bisley, near Sapperton, Gloucestershire.

Lady Patricia's house is Nether Winchendon House in Nether Winchendon, Buckinghamshire.

Originally filmed as three series, broadcast of the second series was delayed by coverage of the Gulf War and series 2 and 3 were shown as a continuous twelve-episode second series in 1992.

The series was originally conceived and written by Terence Brady and Charlotte Bingham for LWTV and Picture Partnerships. Brady and Bingham then wrote the entire first series.

== Home video and DVD ==
Forever Green: The Complete First Series DVD as released by Network.

The first series of Forever Green was originally released on VHS via Castle Vision, in a set containing two video tapes, before receiving a DVD release in 2006 from Granada Ventures. No further releases were made by these distribution companies.

Network acquired the rights for home distribution and the first series again made available in 2009, with the addition of the first-ever release of the second series, and a complete series set in 2010.

DVD overview
Title	Release date		No. of discs	BBFC rating
Title	DVD (Granada)	DVD (Network)	No. of discs	BBFC rating
The Complete First Series	2006	1 June 2009	2	PG
The Complete Second Series	—N/a	5 April 2010	3	PG
The Complete Series	—N/a	25 October 2010	5	PG

== See also ==
- Down to Earth (BBC series with a very similar theme)
