= Tayla Goodman =

British actress

Tayla Tracey Goodman (born 24 December 1968 in Nottingham) is a British actress, turned writer and director. Tayla wrote her first feature film Bob's Night Out, in 2010 starring P. H. Moriarty, for which she was nominated for a BAFTA Rockliffe writers award. It's a comedy about an ageing gangster who escapes from the window of his nursing home to live a life of loose women, fast cars and gambling.

Tayla started her acting career at the age of 9 at The Central Television Junior Workshop, working alongside Sue Nott, later executive producer at CBBC. Tayla appeared in programmes such as Your Mother Wouldn't Like It, Murphy's Mob, Lunar, and Boon, she then went on to write the rock musical Virus in 1999, which ran at the Nottingham Theatre Royal starring Jack Wild, Samantha Fox and Goodman herself.

After many television appearances, short films, musical recordings, and a role in the Manchester United AGM plot, she went on to work as an undercover journalist in the 1990s on The Cook Report and the From Hell series. She then landed the role of Nini Diehl, a psychiatric patient, in the film Escape From Madness, in July 2012. With her business partner, Peter Everett, Goodman is CEO of London Bridge Films. Tayla is also known for presenting the Entrepreneurs series for LEO TV Asia in 2015. In 2016, Tayla produced a music video for Ozzy Osbourne's ex-drummer Lee Kerslake and later went on to produce and direct a documentary of his life story.
