= Wizadora =

British children's television series

- Created by: Don Arioli; Carolyne Cullum
- Starring: Maria Gough (1991); Wendy van der Plank (1993–96); Lizzie McPhee; (1997–98); Steven Ryde (1994–98); Brian Murphy; Tessa Hatts; Joe Greco (1993); Emma Amos (1991)
- Composers: Hutt 'N' Thrust; Rod Anderson
- Country of origin: United Kingdom
- Original language: English
- No. of series: 7 (+ 1 Oxsted)
- No. of episodes: 204

Production
- Producer: Janie Grace
- Production location: Fountain Studios
- Running time: 10 (Oxford series); 15 (ITV, series 1); 9 (ITV, series 2–7)

Original release
- Network: ITV (CITV)
- Release: 15 September – 3 November 1991
- Release: 5 January 1993 – 26 February 1998

Wizadora is a children's television programme created by Don Arioli and Carolyne Cullum. It was originally broadcast on SWR in 1991 and it was used as an English-language learning tool for non-English speakers. In 1993, the series was picked up by ITV in the United Kingdom.

== Development ==
The series' pilot starred Fawlty Towers writer and actress Connie Booth, who had been alerted to the character by John Cleese, who had taken an interest in the production. The pilot was never broadcast.

The concept was then developed into a language teaching tool for children to learn English as a second language, published by Oxford University Press in 1991. Books, audio, and media were produced alongside the series. The title role of Wizadora was played by Connie Booth in the unaired pilot, before Maria Gough took on the role for Oxford University Press. Cathy Lawday was the writer and editor of the books and media produced for Oxford.

In 1992, Meridian Broadcasting picked up the series for broadcast on television. Considerable changes were made for this series, including the introduction of Wendy van der Plank as Wizadora, who remained as the character from 1993 to 1996. Lizzie McPhee took over the role in 1997 until the series' end. Tatty, who was originally played by a woman (Debbie Cumming), was now played by a man (Joe Greco 1993–94, Steven Ryde 1994–98), and Phoebe, who was originally played by actor Emma Amos, was re-introduced as a "life-sized" model. Many characters were introduced, and the original characters were given a makeover. Connie Booth was brought back in to write episodes for the series, among others.

== Characters ==
- Wizadora (played by Connie Booth in the unaired pilot episode, Maria Gough in the Oxford series, and Wendy van der Plank (1993–96) and Lizzie McPhee (1997–98) in the ITV series) – The title character and protagonist of the series, a trainee and later apprentice wizard who receives her magic wand in the pilot episode and initially has problems getting her spells right. Some of the things in Wizadora's kitchen are able to talk due to stray spells. Wizadora often breaks the fourth wall and talks to the viewers, and usually asks for their help when casting her spells. Wizadora's catchphrases include "Oh, botheration!" and "Time for a bit of Wizzification!".

=== Wizadora's companions ===
- Tatty Bogle (played by Debbie Cumming in the Oxford series and Joe Greco(1993–94) and Steven Ryde (1994–98) in the ITV series) – A dim-witted scarecrow who lives in Wizadora's back garden and continually gets his words muddled up. The character was played by a woman before being reintroduced as a man for ITV. Ryde was the voice-over announcer between programmes for ITV's CITV strand during the same period.
- Stan the Shopkeeper (played by Brian Murphy) – A shopkeeper who regularly takes delivery of new magical catalogue items and is very cautious of Wizadora's spells.
- Pippa the Postwoman (played by Tessa Hatts) – A postwoman who rides a bike on her rounds and often becomes tired.
- Top/Sticky/Bottom – Three talking drawer people, who resemble socks. Once described as "a real nuisance" by Wizadora, they are very naughty, usually teasing Hangle and/or Filbert, and are always attempting to steal food or get up to some kind of mischief whenever Wizadora's back is turned. Their antics usually end up causing much trouble; one time, Top invented a Grub Grabber to try and steal some food, but the device frightened Filbert, who accidentally knocked over some potions, some of which got into Very Old Fish's tank and turned him into a purple blob. Wizadora usually punishes them by zapping them back into their drawers with her wand. In the Oxford series, there was a fourth character in the group called Middle.
- Phoebe – A talking telephone. In the Oxford series, actor Emma Amos was dressed in a pink costume to play the role. In the ITV series, Phoebe appears as a 'life-sized' model telephone, pink with a yellow headset, but in later series, she is orange with a red headset. From Series Six onwards, her headset is red with coloured stars on it. Phoebe answers calls, takes messages, and speaks various languages. Phoebe was voiced by four different voice actors during the ITV series run.
- Filbert (ITV Series One to Five only) – A squeaking vegetable (a Vegimal) and a fellow trainee wizard. He is also regularly seen gardening. He was born from a seed in the first ITV series, and at first, Wizadora had no idea as to who he was. He loves to water plants and is best friends with Tatty. In Series One, Filbert talked in gibberish as he was still learning how to speak, and in later series, English, as the character develops. Filbert often gets himself into trouble, although meaning well. He is very kind-hearted and is always offers to help out Wizadora or Tatty. In the Series Five episode "Filbert's New House", he leaves Wizadora's place to start a new life independently.
- Dog Doormat (ITV Series One only) – A barking doormat.
- Hangle – A purple coat hanger (but who insists on calling himself a cloak hanger) with a yellow raincoat, glasses and a purple moustache, who has quite an obsession with cleaning. In the episode "Hangle's Big Day", he locks everyone out in the garden because he thinks they are too untidy. As a result, he ends up hurting his back due to being too stubborn. He has a crude sense of humour and is also quite bossy. In the first episode of Series One, Hangle introduces himself as "Cliff Hangle, cloak hanger extraordinaire".
- Very Old Fish – A cryptic, talking male fish who likes to tell stories about his life.
- Poot (ITV Series Two onwards) – Wizadora's computer, who is often used to help with Wizadora's questions. In Series Two and Three, Poot was male, green and flat-shaped. In Series Four, the character was reintroduced as a female and was given a more computer-like appearance with a pale orange face (Rebecca Nagan's).
- Nigel the Snail (ITV Series Two onwards) – A blue snail who lives with Very Old Fish.
- The Crows (Series Three onwards) – Two crows; brothers called Boris and Horace, who cause mayhem for Tatty Bogle in the garden.
- Roxy (Introduced in Series Five) – A friendly talking spider who lives in Tatty's treehouse.
- Dusty (seen in ITV Series One and again in Series Six) – A creature who lives under the fridge, has a very loud operatic voice, and is usually sleeping.
- Tom and Katie (played by Harriet Carmichael and Adam Johnstone; Oxford series only) – two children who live near Wizadora. Not seen in the ITV series.

=== Other cast and credits ===
Puppeteers Philip Eason, Francis Wright, Michael Bayliss, Sue Dacre, Jeremy Stockwell, Barnaby Harrison, Don Austen, Brian Herring, Neil Sterenberg, Rebecca Nagan, Debby Cumming, Marie Phillips, Sheila Clark and Victoria Willing worked on the series.

The ITV series was made for Meridian Broadcasting by production companies Workhouse and North Pole Productions at The Fountain Studios in New Malden and directed by David Crozier. Fifteen episodes of Series 3 were directed by Wendy J. Dyer. The theme music was composed by Dave Hutton, who was also the Senior Cameraman on the first four series of the show. The theme tune for the ITV series was recorded at Gordon Thrussell's studios at Ashford in Kent, and the credits show music by 'Hutt and Thrust'. This was because the director, David Crozier, did not want the same name for two different credits on the programme (i.e.: Snr Cameraman and Music). The other cameramen were Roger Backhouse, and Angus Macmillan and sometimes Steve Leach. The vision mixer was Julie Miller.

== Transmission guide ==
Series	Episodes	Originally released	
Series	Episodes	First released	Last released
Oxford	8	15 September 1991	3 November 1991
1	18	5 January 1993	4 May 1993
2	30	6 September 1993	6 July 1994
3	30	7 September 1994	15 December 1994
4	32	5 September 1995	21 December 1995
5	30	3 September 1996	26 December 1996
6	32	2 September 1997	23 October 1997
7	32	28 October 1997	26 February 1998

=== Oxford Series (1991) ===
1. "Phoebe Calling" – 15 September 1991
2. "A Red Banana" – 22 September 1991
3. "Happy Birthday" – 29 September 1991
4. "The Magic Cloak" – 6 October 1991
5. "Can You Fly?" – 13 October 1991
6. "Where Is Katie?" – 20 October 1991
7. "The Picnic" – 27 October 1991
8. "Hangle Is Lost" – 3 November 1991

=== Series 1 (1993) ===
1. "The Magic Parcel" – 5 January 1993
2. "Time for Tidying" – 12 January 1993
3. "Hello Filbert" – 19 January 1993
4. "A Colourful Day" – 26 January 1993
5. "Lovely Weather" – 2 February 1993
6. "Picnic Problems" – 9 February 1993
7. "Mops & Bicycles" – 16 February 1993
8. "Hangle in Charge" – 23 February 1993
9. "A Very Special Day" – 2 March 1993
10. "Wellingtons & Snails" – 9 March 1993
11. "The Purple Powder" – 16 March 1993
12. "Tea Time Troubles" – 23 March 1993
13. "The Octocleaner" – 30 March 1993
14. "Wand & Superwand" – 6 April 1993
15. "Eggs & Bicycles" – 13 April 1993
16. "Tricky Things Umbrellas" – 20 April 1993
17. "Autumn Laughter" – 27 April 1993
18. "Firework Party" – 4 May 1993

=== Series 2 (1993–1994) ===
1. "Poot Saves the Day" – 6 September 1993
2. "A Change for Filbert" – 13 September 1993
3. "A Good Day for Sun" – 20 September 1993
4. "Just Your Imagination" – 22 September 1993
5. "The Thingummy Jig" – 27 September 1993
6. "Where Was I?" – 29 September 1993
7. "I Smell a Smell" – 4 October 1993
8. "The Squeaking Door" – 6 October 1993
9. "Magical Music" – 11 October 1993
10. "To Have and to Have More" – 13 October 1993
11. "Rhyme Time" – 18 October 1993
12. "I Spy" – 20 October 1993
13. "Cheers and Tears" – 25 October 1993
14. "Round and Round the Garden" – 27 October 1993
15. "Eat Well, Stay Well" – 1 November 1993
16. "Look Before You Leap" – 3 November 1993
17. "Easy as One Two Three" – 8 November 1993
18. "Strangers Among Us" – 10 November 1993
19. "Five Carrot Pie" – 15 November 1993
20. "Something Old, Something New" – 17 November 1993
21. "Be Careful, Wizadora!" – 22 November 1993
22. "Soft, Strong, Brittle and Weak" – 24 November 1993
23. "Coughs and Sneezes" – 29 November 1993
24. "No More, Please" – 1 December 1993
25. "Who Needs Elbows" – 6 December 1993
26. "Mine All Mine" – 8 December 1993
27. "A Use for Everything" – 13 December 1993
28. "Peace and Quiet" – 29 June 1994
29. "A Matter of Size" – 30 June 1994
30. "Good Friends" – 6 July 1994

=== Series 3 (1994) ===
1. "A Message from Max" – 7 September 1994
2. "Pips and Plants" – 8 September 1994
3. "Sneezeberries" – 14 September 1994
4. "Too Big, Too Small" – 15 September 1994
5. "Bubble Trouble" – 21 September 1994
6. "A Sing-Song for Stan" – 22 September 1994
7. "Sixes and Nines" – 28 September 1994
8. "All Together Now!" – 29 September 1994
9. "I Smell a Lie" – 5 October 1994
10. "Pippa's Surprise" – 6 October 1994
11. "Cheer Up, Filbert!" – 12 October 1994
12. "Let's Dance!" – 13 October 1994
13. "The Shopping List" – 19 October 1994
14. "Tatty's Tablecloth" – 20 October 1994
15. "The Tantrum Spell" – 26 October 1994
16. "The Great Flood" – 27 October 1994
17. "Buttons and Holes" – 2 November 1994
18. "The Litter Spell" – 3 November 1994
19. "Fun with Books" – 9 November 1994
20. "No Time for Tea Time" – 10 November 1994
21. "Hard, Soft, Smooth and Rough" – 16 November 1994
22. "The Grabber" – 17 November 1994
23. "Pedal Power" – 23 November 1994
24. "The Mud Monster" – 24 November 1994
25. "Wool Trouble" – 30 November 1994
26. "Pots and Spells" – 1 December 1994
27. "That's What Friends Are For" – 7 December 1994
28. "A Stuck Sticky" – 8 December 1994: Tatty gets stuck up a tree.
29. "Use Your Imagination" – 14 December 1994
30. "Beginnings and Endings" – 15 December 1994

=== Series 4 (1995) ===
1. "Who's Afraid of the Dark?" – 30 August 1995
2. "Mirror Mirror" – 31 August 1995
3. "Filbert's New House" – 6 September 1995
4. "Sounds Brilliant" – 7 September 1995
5. "Big Uns and Little Uns" – 13 September 1995
6. "Making Pippa Strong" – 14 September 1995
7. "Shadow Monsters" – 20 September 1995
8. "Sharing Magic" – 21 September 1995
9. "Too Full" – 27 September 1995
10. "Stan's the Man" – 28 September 1995
11. "Good Winners and Bad Losers" – 4 October 1995
12. "Follow the Track" – 5 October 1995
13. "Snow in July" – 11 October 1995
14. "Shape Up" – 12 October 1995
15. "Here's One We Made Earlier" – 18 October 1995
16. "First Things First" – 19 October 1995
17. "Bless You" – 25 October 1995
18. "It's a Good Job" – 26 October 1995
19. "Hangle Takes a Trip" – 1 1995
20. "Glad Rags" – 2 November 1995
21. "Top of the List" – 8 November 1995
22. "Sticky Moments" – 9 November 1995
23. "I Spy with My Little Eye" – 15 November 1995
24. "Fish Alive" – 16 November 1995
25. "Communication Breakdown" – 22 November 1995
26. "Watchout Below" – 23 November 1995
27. "Making and Breaking" – 29 November 1995
28. "Beside the Seaside" – 30 November 1995
29. "Inside Out" – 6 December 1995
30. "You Can Count on Poot" – 7 December 1995
31. "Tatty's New Boots" – 13 December 1995
32. "Boots, Beads and Beards" – 14 December 1995

=== Series 5 (1996) ===
1. "Tatty Town" – 5 September 1996
2. "Wizadora Plays Football" – 10 September 1996
3. "Drawer People Behaving Badly" – 12 September 1996
4. "Aunt Dora's Parcel" – 17 September 1996
5. "Bottom Gets Lost" – 19 September 1996
6. "There's No Place Like Home" – 24 September 1996
7. "The Music Spell" – 26 September 1996
8. "Something Fishy" – 1 October 1996
9. "Take Care" – 3 October 1996
10. "Wizadora's Bad Dream" – 8 October 1996
11. "Sentimental Journey" – 10 October 1996
12. "What's Yours Is Mine" – 15 October 1996
13. "I'm in Charge – 17 October 1996
14. "What About Me" – 22 October 1996
15. "Hurry Up" – 24 October 1996
16. "Jungle Fever" – 29 October 1996
17. "Roxy's Web" – 31 October 1996
18. "What Did You Say" – 5 November 1996
19. "Old Habits Die Hard" – 7 November 1996
20. "A Moving Story" – 12 November 1996
21. "Safety Last" – 14 November 1996
22. "Stan's Difficult Day" – 19 November 1996
23. "Bending the Rules" – 21 November 1996
24. "The Crows" – 26 November 1996
25. "A Rainy Day" – 28 November 1996
26. "Hangle's Big Day" – 5 December 1996
27. "You Are Where You Are" – 10 December 1996
28. "Knit Twits" – 12 December 1996
29. "The Jealous Queen" – 17 December 1996
30. "Goodbye, Wizadora" – 19 December 1996

=== Series 6 (1997) ===
1. "The Paper Chase" – 7 January 1997
2. "Crow Overboard" – 9 January 1997
3. "If We Could Be Giants" – 14 January 1997
4. "The Strange Parcel" – 16 January 1997
5. "Anyone for Doubles" – 21 January 1997
6. "Cheese Tasting Tuesday" – 23 January 1997
7. "Sticking Together" – 28 January 1997
8. "The Wish Spell" – 30 January 1997
9. "A Night Out" – 4 February 1997
10. "The Birthday Surprise" – 6 February 1997
11. "Rhyme Time" – 11 February 1997
12. "The Wrong Cloak" – 13 February 1997
13. "No Doughnut for Breakfast" – 2 September 1997
14. "The Useful Spell" – 4 September 1997
15. "The Mystery Box" – 9 September 1997
16. "The Upside Down Spell" – 11 September 1997
17. "The Helpful Spell" – 16 September 1997
18. "Dream On" – 18 September 1997
19. "A Promise Is a Promise" – 23 September 1997
20. "Collecting Crows" – 25 September 1997
21. "Welcome Back, Tatty" – 30 September 1997
22. "The Old Switcheroo" – 2 October 1997
23. "Arty Party" – 7 October 1997
24. "The Strange Spell" – 9 October 1997
25. "The Mischievous Spell" – 14 October 1997
26. "Tottie Bagel" – 16 October 1997
27. "Try It Again, Wizadora" – 21 October 1997
28. "Temper Temper" – 23 October 1997
29. "GGG-Ghosts" – 28 October 1997
30. "Friends" – 30 October 1997
31. "Tiny Troubles" – 4 November 1997
32. "We Should Be So Lucky" – 6 November 1997

=== Series 7 (1997–1998) ===
1. "The Magic Carpet" – 11 November 1997
2. "Wizadora's Bad Day" – 13 November 1997
3. "No More Miss Mice Wiz" – 18 November 1997
4. "Wiz Gives Up" – 20 November 1997
5. "Plant Power" – 25 November 1997
6. "The Talent Contest" – 27 November 1997
7. "A Quick Snack" – 2 December 1997
8. "Wizadora Disappears" – 4 December 1997
9. "Sing Sing Sing" – 11 December 1997
10. "Wizadora's Christmas Carol Part 1" – 16 December 1997
11. "Wizadora's Christmas Carol Part 2" – 18 December 1997
12. "The Frightful Creature" – 6 January 1998
13. "High Fliers" – 8 January 1998
14. "Crow Tamer" – 13 January 1998
15. "No Laughing Matter" – 15 January 1998
16. "Paper, Plastic and Tins" – 20 January 1998
17. "The Cave of Dark" – 22 January 1998
18. "If I Only Had a Heart" – 27 January 1998
19. "Big Business" 29 January 1998
20. "A Barrel of Trouble" – 3 February 1998
21. "A Dragon for Tea" – 5 February 1998
22. "Pippa's Bad Hair Day" – 10 February 1998
23. "Good Manners" – 12 February 1998
24. "Tatty's Birthday Surprise" – 17 February 1998
25. "Double Trouble" – 19 February 1998
26. "A Right Pain" – 1 September 1998
27. "No Place Like Home" – 2 September 1998
28. "One Is Fun" – 3 September 1998
29. "Future Shop" – 4 September 1998
30. "Good Food Bad Food" – 7 September 1998
31. "Exciting Times" – 8 September 1998
32. "Who Is Important" – 9 September 1998

== Reception ==
One episode of Wizadora starring Lizzie McPhee was broadcast on CITV on 5 January 2013 (the show's 20th anniversary) as part of a CITV anniversary special. The channel received its highest viewing figures to date: Wizadora attracted 460,000, followed by Danger Mouse, which attracted 578,000 viewers during the "old skool" weekend run. This was the first time the show had been broadcast in the UK since repeats were shown on Living TV in the early 2000s. As of June 2020, episodes from Series One are now showing on BritBox in the UK.

== Home video and DVD ==
The earliest version of the show has been released on DVD (Oxford University Press). However, this is not the ITV version and is instead an educational package.

=== Video Collection International ===
Some VHS cassettes of the show were released in the mid-1990s by Video Collection International Ltd., featuring episodes from Series One to Three.

Cover of one of the Wizadora video releases, showing Tatty Bogle (Steven Ryde) and Wizadora (Wendy van der Plank).

1. Wizadora – The Magic Parcel (14 June 1993) – The Magic Parcel, Time For Tidying, and Hello Filbert.
2. Wizadora – A Colourful Day (26 July 1993) – A Colourful Day, Lovely Weather and Picnic Problems.
3. Wizadora – Mops and Bicycles (16 August 1993) – Mops and Bicycles, Hang in Charge and A Very Special Day.
4. Wizadora – Wellingtons and Snails (1 August 1994) – Wellingtons and Snails, The Purple Powder and Tea Time Troubles.
5. My Little Wizadora – The Magic Parcel/Time For Tidying (1 April 1996)
6. My Little Wizadora – Hello Filbert/A Colourful Day (1 July 1996)
7. My Little Wizadora – Lovely Weather / Picnic Problems (7 October 1996)
8. My Little Wizadora – Mops and Bicycles/Hangle In Charge (4 November 1996)

=== Astrion Video ===
1. Wizadora – A Message from Max (3 April 1995) A Message From Max and five other stories
2. Wizadora – Sneezeberries (3 April 1995) Sneezeberries and five other stories
3. Wizadora – Too Big, Too Small (18 August 1995) Too Big, Too Small and five other stories
4. ’’Wizadora – Sixes And Nines’’ (18 August 1995) Sixes and Nines and five other stories
5. ’’Wizadora – Bubble Trouble’’ (18 August 1995) Bubble Trouble and five other stories

=== UK VHS releases ===
VHS title	Release date	Episodes
Wizadora – The Magic Parcel (VC1297)	14 June 1993	The Magic Parcel, Time For Tidying, Hello Filbert
Wizadora – A Colourful Day (VC1304)	26 July 1993	A Colourful Day, Lovely Weather, Picnic Problems
Wizadora – Mops and Bicycles (VC1308)	16 August 1993	Mops and Bicycles, Hangle In Charge, A Very Special Day
Wizadora – Wellingtons and Snails (VC1328)	1 August 1994	Wellingtons and Snails, The Purple Powder, Tea Time Troubles
My Little Wizadora – The Magic Parcel/Time For Tidying (ML0019)	1 April 1996	The Magic Parcel, Time For Tidying
My Little Wizadora – Lovely Weather/Picnic Problems (ML0020)	1 July 1996	Lovely Weather, Picnic Problems
My Little Wizadora – Mops and Bicycles/Hangle In Charge (ML0021)	1 July 1996	Mops and Bicycles, Hangle In Charge
My Little Wizadora – Hello Filbert/A Colourful Day (ML0031)	7 October 1996	Hello Filbert, A Colourful Day

==== DVD releases ====
- "Wizadora – Oxford DVD"
- "Wizadora – A message From Max And Other Stories"
- Wizadora – Series One, Volume One.

== Revamp ==
In 2003, Entertainment Rights produced a nine-minute pilot for a proposed reboot of the series for Channel 5's Milkshake! children's programming strand with Anne Foy as Wizadora. Although a new version of the original theme tune was used and the overall look of the set was generally in keeping with the earlier version, the characters were given varying makeovers, with none of the original models being used, and several new minor characters were introduced. CGI and Chroma key effects featured heavily. The proposed new series was not picked up, reportedly due to it being considered too costly.

Although there are no plans for the ITV series to return, the Oxford series is still in production, with episodes being repeated on SWR Television. The original Oxford series is still used today as a teaching tool for children to learn English as a second language. The DVD, book, and audio tapes are still available to buy online, along with a PC CD-ROM. A free app was produced in 2016. A website was set up in 2015, though it is now defunct as of 2018. In 2016, the German SWR Television Educational Programmes set up a website featuring the series to foster use of Wizadora films and educational games in elementary schools in Germany. Free educational games based on the series have been developed since 2016.
