= The Legend of Dick and Dom =

Television series

- Written by: Carl Carter & Tony Cooke; Simon A Brown; Julian Kemp; Ciaran Murtagh & Andrew Jones; Claire McCarthy
- Directed by: Jeremy Wooding; Dez McCarthy
- Starring: Dominic Wood; Richard McCourt; Steve Furst; Chloe Bale; Terry Jones; Dave Chapman; Ian Kirkby
- Country of origin: United Kingdom
- No. of series: 3
- No. of episodes: 33

Production
- Producer: Steve Ryde
- Running time: 28 minutes

Original release
- Network: CBBC; BBC One
- Release: 2 January 2009 – 24 March 2011

The Legend of Dick and Dom is a sitcom starring Richard McCourt and Dominic Wood (Dick and Dom respectively), who are portrayed as two princes who find the antidote to a plague that has consumed their kingdom Fyredor. The cast also includes Mannitol (Steve Furst), a wizard and Lutin (Chloe Bale), a thief. During the quest, they have to find various items which, when mixed together, create the antidote. The programme is narrated by former Monty Python member Terry Jones. The show concluded on the 24th March 2011 after three series.

== Episodes ==
=== Series overview ===
Series	Episodes	Originally released	
Series	Episodes	First released	Last released
1	13	2 January 2009	27 April 2009
2	10	3 March 2010	5 May 2010
3	10	19 January 2011	24 March 2011

=== Series 1 (2009) ===
No. overall	No. in season	Title	Original release date	Prod. code
1	1	"Tickle Tournament"	2 January 2009	1.1
Princes Dick and Dom enter a tickling tournament to win a Magnofish for the potion, and face the current world champions, the Two Shadows.
2	2	"Milk"	9 January 2009	1.2
The next item on Dick and Dom's quest is a pint of milk, but Bottom World has run dry. Who has captured all the cows?
3	3	"Princess Gladys"	16 January 2009	1.3
Our heroes need dandruff from the golden hair of Princess Gladys. Prince Dom is in love, but has a rival for her hand in marriage.
4	4	"The Neehi Tribe"	23 January 2009	1.4
Dick and Dom seek the fruit of the lost Neehi tribe, but will it lead to war?
5	5	"Swampy's Girlfriend"	30 January 2009	1.5
The two princes need the song of the swamp monster to add to their potion. Meanwhile, Lutin swerves away from the quest temporarily.
6	6	"Hairwolf"	6 February 2009	1.6
The princes' potion requires a lock of hair from the golden wig of Barnet, but the wig is cursed and a foul beast terrorises the land.
7	7	"Nan Trap"	13 February 2009	1.7
The quest for the next ingredient leads the gang to Nan's house, but will she ever let them leave?
8	8	"Mists of Time"	20 February 2009	1.8
The heroes need The Mists of Time to add to their potion. Who would have thought this quest would take them to modern-day Slough?
9	9	"Back to School"	27 February 2009	1.9
Princes Dick and Dom send their terrible wizard, Mannitol, back to wizard school while they hunt down a dragon's clack, the next potion ingredient.
10	10	"Tears of Fury"	6 March 2009	1.10
The terrible Furies are feared throughout the land but our heroes need to make one cry to continue their quest. Things take a turn for the worse for the boys when Lutin betrays them to the people that protect the Furies.
11	11	"Rock Hard"	13 March 2009	1.11
When the gang try to pinch the King of Kong's conker, Princes Dick and Dom are turned to stone; is this the end for our heroes?
12	12	"Vampire Baby"	20 March 2009	1.12
The potion needs a little something from Alan the Vampire Baby. Our heroes must journey to Deepest darkest Pramsylvania.
13	13	"Dr Cheese"	27 March 2009	1.13
By finding the last ingredient, a Griffin’s snot, the potion is finally complete - but will it work? The heroes return to the kingdom of Fyredor to try it out, and remember the many adventures they had along the way. They eventually discover from the eccentric Dr. Cheese that because of Mannitol, they have collected a cure for athlete's foot as they were using a prescription scroll for his infection instead of a magic scroll. They have to do the quest all over again.

=== Series 2 (2010) ===
No. overall	No. in season	Title	Original release date	Prod. code
14	1	"Beastly"	3 March 2010	2.1
The plague is starting to turn humans into animals, and the gang must work faster than ever to retrieve potion ingredients. Before beginning their quest once more, they meet Hans, who says that Mannitol has resigned from the quest and that he is to help them instead. But what are Hans' true motives?
15	2	"Dick's Brain"	10 March 2010	2.2
The antidote needs the brain of a prince called Dick, but after Prince Dick refuses to let them to take his brain, the gang are forced to search for another prince by the name of Dick. Meanwhile, evil clones of Dick, Dom, Lutin and Mannitol cause chaos at the fairest fairy fayre and the gang are put to blame - it's time to call in Inspector Harold Batt.
16	3	"Hag Pus"	17 March 2010	2.3
The heroes need the pus from an old hag's spot, but they become children, and the hag turns children into butter!
17	4	"Sirens"	24 March 2010	2.4
The sirens are twelve feet tall with rows of razor-sharp teeth, and the heroes need one of their talons for the potion!
18	5	"Garlic Tuesday"	31 March 2010	2.5
The four need the biggest Turnip in Bottom world. Dick is celebrating a festival that Dom made up. An ogre is attacking a village of vegetables. It's a catastrophe!
19	6	"Heist"	7 April 2010	2.6
Whilst their penguin's egg, the next ingredient, is defrosting, the gang have to steal back the potion from a corrupt bank manager and his child henchmen.
20	7	"Hairy Fizzogs"	14 April 2010	2.7
The Hairy Fizzogs are the hottest boy band in Bottom World, but now they have the plague! To make matters worse, the heroes are stalked by a sinister duck...
21	8	"Journey to the Centre of Bottom World"	21 April 2010	2.8
The Eye of the Beholder is needed, so the heroes descend to Bottom World's very core.
22	9	"Haunted"	28 April 2010	2.9
The princes need a ghost for the last potion ingredient - and where better to find one than Aaargh Manor? But there are sinister forces at work - and Lutin's gingerbread addiction becomes out of control.
23	10	"The Beastmaster"	5 May 2010	2.10
The group are imprisoned by the Beastmaster at last, but despite the danger they are determined to escape...

=== Series 3 (2011) ===
No. overall	No. in season	Title	Original release date	Prod. code
24	1	"Escape"	19 January 2011	3.1
Imprisoned by the evil Beastmaster, Princes Dick and Dom must escape with their cure before the kingdom of Fyredor is doomed forever.
25	2	"The Loopy Tribe"	26 January 2011	3.2
The princes encounter the daftest tribe in all of Bottom World. They think that Prince Dick is a God, and they want him to stay forever.
26	3	"The Magic Oblong"	2 February 2011	3.3
What dark secret does this mysterious wizard's society hide? Could this be the end of our heroes' fellowship?
27	4	"Valley of the Bigheads"	9 February 2011	3.4
Princes Dick and Dom are put to the test. Will they overcome the biggest brains in Bottom World?
28	5	"Land of the Luvies"	9 February 2011	3.5
The gang arrives at Land of the Luvies. With Prince Dom possessed by the Tribe; Will he give in to the power of Jazz Hands?
29	6	"Forget Me Nuts"	23 February 2011	3.6
In an ancient grove where very peculiar nuts grow, the heroes struggle to remember who they are or where they are headed.
30	7	"The Numbskulls of the Beast"	2 March 2011	3.7
The princes journey into the mind of the Beastmaster. What foul discoveries lie in wait?
31	8	"The Cabbage Ball Run"	9 March 2011	3.8
Princes Dick and Dom must take part in the biggest race in Bottom World to escape the Beastmaster.
32	9	"The Cabbage Ball Secret"	16 March 2011	3.9
The cure has been stolen. Will the heroes be able to retrieve it and return it to Fyredor before it is destroyed?
33	10	"Home"	24 March 2011	3.10
As the heroes get closer to home the Beastmaster makes his final attack. Will Princes Dick and Dom fail in their quest once again?

== Guest stars ==
Several well-known faces from CBBC have played guest parts in The Legend of Dick and Dom. These include Kate Edmondson (Hider in the House), Ted Robbins (The Slammer), Phil Cornwell (who has appeared in various shows such as MI High and Dani's House), Dave Chapman (Dick and Dom in Da Bungalow) and Ian Kirkby (Dick and Dom in Da Bungalow and Harry Batt). Kirkby and Chapman have semi-regular roles throughout the series (see below). Fenella Fielding also started in the episode called Land of the Luvvies. There have also been guest appearances by veteran entertainers, including Alan Ford (The Armando Iannucci Shows), Ian Lavender (Dad's Army) and Stephen K. Amos (The Stephen K. Amos Show)
