= The Saturday Show (2001 TV series) =

- Genre: Children's
- Presented by: Dani Behr; Joe Mace; Fearne Cotton; Simon Grant; Angelica Bell; Jake Humphrey
- Country of origin: United Kingdom
- Original language: English
- No. of series: 4
- No. of episodes: 149

Production
- Production location: BBC Television Centre
- Running time: 180 minutes (2001–03); 90 minutes (2004–05)

Original release
- Network: BBC One
- Release: 22 September 2001 – 3 September 2005

The Saturday Show is a British children's television series that aired on BBC One from 22 September 2001 to 3 September 2005. It was the replacement for Live & Kicking and contained a mix of audience participation, cartoons, games and gunge. The presenters were Dani Behr and Joe Mace, who presented the show from September 2001 - September 2002, then Fearne Cotton and Simon Grant presented from September 2002 to September 2003 and Grant presented until the programme finished in September 2005. Then in April 2004, Angelica Bell and Jake Humphrey joined Grant until the end of the show's run.

== Early days ==
In 2001, it was announced that Live & Kicking would be axed after eight series, and instead, a brand new show fronted by Dani Behr and Joe Mace would be aired. It would be a radical departure from standard and conventional Saturday Morning TV. The new show was billed to be tough competition for SMTV Live. The show was confined to the studio, which was designed in an unconventional format – it was based on tiered seating and three stages at the bottom: one with a presenters' couch, one for performances and one for The Saturday Show house band, Stamford Amp. The show included a series of different karaokes, including Sugababes week. This allowed the children to sing along to the official instrumentals. The show also featured a puppet duo, "Tiny and Mr Duk" performed by Dave Chapman and Damian Farrell. Stamford Amp also had a top 40 hit single in the UK with "Anything For You".

In February 2002, with the CBBC Channel having just launched, Nihal and Sarra Elgan were presenting The Saturday Show Extra, which ran parallel to the main programme. It had a new studio and new graphics. The new set consisted of a couch underneath a balcony. There was a stage on the other side of the studio, in standard SMTV Live convention. The relaunch also saw more audience participation at home.

In July 2002, Joe Mace chose to not renew his contract, and Behr left the show with him. The Saturday Show was about to be axed but the much younger and child-friendlier pairing of Fearne Cotton and Simon Grant agreed to take the slot.

Tiny and Mr Duk remained on the show with the new presenters, until Dave Chapman and Damian Farrell left the show in December 2002.

== 2002 to 2004 ==
The show was rebranded to The All New Saturday Show from September 2002. At the start of the show, the presenters acted in a manner focussed on a younger audience, with the content and the behaviour of the presenters maturing as the morning progressed, in order to accommodate a teenage audience. With the new show, the Top of the Pops spin-off series TOTP Saturday was created. The original concept was a 45-minute version of the Friday night Show with that week's number one single played halfway through. A new feature called Singles Out dominated part of the show and became part of the format for the 2003 series. In May 2003, the show began Celebrity Fastermind which began to dominate the first hour of the show. Since then, the show began to drop its opening titles and got stuck in with a format of games, gunge and celebrities. Finally in September 2003, Dick and Dom in da Bungalow was to premiere on BBC One. Overall, the new show was a ratings success, taking over SMTV Live for many weeks. The Saturday Show Extra was moved to 12 pm on the CBBC Channel, but was eventually dropped.

After a successful run, the show returned in April 2004 with another new look. Angelica Bell and Jake Humphrey joined Simon Grant. The show was once again not set in a traditional studio. The audience sat on couches whereas the presenters had nowhere to sit, instead being on their feet for the majority of the show. With only 90 minutes to air, the show began at 8:30am, finishing at 10am followed by The Mysti Show. Many features were aired in this series – the finale to the show was Gunge GBH.

== 2004 to end ==
Now a celebrity-free environment, the BBC revamped the show, hoping to make it more interactive. Throughout the morning, the audience would take part in games such as Scary Buckets, Stick and Twist and Blushing Roulette, amongst others. This series saw a continuous run of out-of-studio reporters such as Ortis and Sophie McDonnell introduced, with McDonnell filling in for Bell on occasion. The show also featured a sketch called Dr Loo, a parody of Doctor Who. The series as a whole was not a success and was axed in 2005. Realising that they would not be on the air at Christmas, the last episode, aired on 3 September, was a Christmas special.

== Features ==
One newer feature of the show was Gunge GBH (GBH standing for Grant, Bell or Humphrey), during which a child was given the chance to gunge a presenter. A segment of the 2005 summer run of The Saturday Show, it started the previous year as just "Gunge Grant" when presenter Simon Grant went head to head with a child in a quiz. Both contestants sat in adjacent gunge tanks and were asked questions sent in by viewers. Question master Jake Humphrey asked each player a question in turn (before which they were given the option to play or pass the question to the other player). Each player had five lives and for each life lost their tank was "topped up" with gunge by Bell. The first contestant to lose all five of their lives was "gunged". If the child won they would also take home prizes but if they lost would instead take home an "I've Been Gunged On The Saturday Show" certificate.

The format was changed the following year allowing all three presenters to rotate turns in the tank. The input of gunge was now controlled by "The God of Gunge." Initially the rules were that if a presenter lost they would remain in the tank the following week, but this was eventually changed to the child choosing which presenter they wished to play against, and subsequently changed again to the drawing of straws. Another change to the game occurred towards the end of the series when the previous five lives became three. Jake Humphrey particularly disliked going in the tank and usually tried to find an excuse not to be gunged - this tended to fail, and he had to play the game.

== Transmissions ==
Series	Start date	End date	Episodes
1	22 September 2001	14 September 2002	52
2	21 September 2002	13 September 2003	52
3	17 April 2004	4 September 2004	21
4	26 March 2005	3 September 2005	24
