= Heroes of Comedy =

British television series

Heroes of Comedy is a British television series, produced by Thames Television, and broadcast on Channel 4, which devotes each episode to a legend of British comedy. It was produced by John Fisher. Beginning in 1995, it followed a 2½ hour more general programme from 1992.

== Episodes ==
=== Series one ===
Episode number	Subject	Original air date
Pilot	Frankie Howerd	1 January 1995
1	Tommy Cooper	13 October 1995
2	Joyce Grenfell	20 October 1995
3	Max Miller*	27 October 1995
4	Arthur Haynes	3 November 1995
5	Terry-Thomas	17 November 1995

- Contributions from Roy Hudd and Bob Monkhouse. An animatronic Miller was created for the programme and performed by David Barclay, Dave Chapman and Mike Quinn.

=== Series two ===
Episode number	Subject	Original air date
1	Les Dawson	16 April 1997
2	Kenny Everett	23 April 1997
3	Alastair Sim	30 April 1997
4	The Goons*	7 May 1997

- The first group subject, and the first where two of the performers covered (Spike Milligan and Harry Secombe) were alive at the time of broadcast.

=== Series three ===
Episode number	Subject	Original air date
1	Benny Hill	12 January 1998
2	Peter Cook	19 January 1998
3	Arthur Askey	26 January 1998
4	Tony Hancock	2 February 1998

This series examined dead performers.

=== Series four ===
Episode number	Subject	Original air date
1	Norman Wisdom	25 September 1999
2	Ken Dodd	2 October 1999
3	Eric Sykes	9 October 1999
4	Thora Hird	16 October 1999
5	Barry Humphries	30 October 1999

All subjects in this series were living at the time of broadcast.

=== Series five ===
Episode number	Subject	Original air date
1	Kenneth Williams	7 October 2000
2	Bernard Manning	11 November 2000
3	Ronnie Barker	28 December 2000
4	Leonard Rossiter	27 December 2001

This series examined living and dead performers.

=== Series six ===
Episode number	Subject	Original air date
1	Mike Yarwood	16 February 2002
2	Sid James	23 February 2002
3	Spike Milligan*	2 March 2002
4	Hattie Jacques	9 March 2002
5	Ronnie Corbett	16 March 2002
6	Dick Emery	13 April 2002

- Previously covered as part of the Goons episode. Aired three days after Milligan's death.

=== Series seven ===
Episode number	Subject	Original air date
1	Max Wall	2 January 2003
