= Nuzzle and Scratch =

British children's television programme

- Created by: Barry Quinn and Alan Robinson
- Written by: Various writers including: Mat Lyons, Karen Ward, Adrian Poynton, Robbie Sims, Dominic MacDonald, Stephen Cannon, Diana Hinshelwood, Simon Davies, Barry Quinn, Tony Reed and Helen Baker
- Directed by: Jack Jameson; Anna Perowne
- Starring: Neil Sterenberg; Dave Chapman; Eve De Leon Allen
- Theme music composer: Chris Banks
- Opening theme: "Nuzzle and Scratch"
- Ending theme: "Nuzzle and Scratch"
- Country of origin: United Kingdom
- Original language: English
- No. of series: 3
- No. of episodes: 53 (list of episodes)

Production
- Producer: Tony Reed
- Cinematography: Tom Hayward
- Editors: Eve Blackwood; David Horwell
- Camera setup: Unknown
- Running time: 20 mins (approx)
- Production company: BBC

Original release
- Network: CBeebies
- Release: 1 September 2008 – 4 March 2011

Nuzzle and Scratch is a British children's television programme, shown on CBeebies from 1 September 2008, that ran for three series with two spin offs up to 4 March 2011. The show also aired on the international CBeebies channels in Poland and Australia. They showed two spin offs, Hoof And Safety, and Frock And Roll. The show aired on CBeebies in the UK.

It stars two eponymous puppet alpacas created and developed by Barry Quinn and Alan Robinson and written by various writers.

== Plot ==
Each episode of the original series follows the same format. Nuzzle and Scratch are employees of '2 by 2, The Any Animal Agency'. run by The Boss, a tough-talking girl. She receives a phone call from someone who is in desperate need of assistance. All of the other animals employed by 2 by 2 (seen on a computer screen towards the beginning of the episode) are found to be unavailable and thus The Boss reluctantly chooses Nuzzle and Scratch. Nuzzle and Scratch often fail at the tasks, get distracted or do a task that is unrelated to the task assigned to them. These are usually portrayed via slapstick comedy. Nuzzle and Scratch eventually do the task correctly. They often win a rosette or are offered a permanent job but refuse, leading them to go on their next assignment.

== Characters ==
=== Main characters ===
- Nuzzle (performed by Neil Sterenberg) is a white fluffy alpaca who likes to climb mountains, but he is afraid of heights. He dislikes starting from "scratch" and wants to start from "nuzzle". He is nervous and cautious.
- Scratch (performed by Dave Chapman) is a brown scruffy alpaca who mainly likes whatever. He likes telling Nuzzle what to do and usually gets Nuzzle in trouble. Unlike Nuzzle, he is energetic and optimistic.
- The Boss (played by Eve De Leon Allen) is a young girl who sends Nuzzle and Scratch to the job.

=== Later additions ===
==== Hoof and Safety with Nuzzle and Scratch ====
- Miss Mulberry (played by Sally Bankes) is the safety supervisor who appeared in the spin-off Hoof and Safety who trains Nuzzle and Scratch to be safe around hazards.

==== Nuzzle and Scratch: Frock and Roll ====
- Captain Carrington (played by Ian Kirkby) is the owner of the Frock 'n' Roll dress shop, as well as Nuzzle and Scratch's owner, helping choose costumes for the twins with Nuzzle and Scratch testing them for a job. He brought up Nuzzle and Scratch from when he was doing his expeditions in the Andes and brought them to England when they were young.
- The Twins (played by Eva and Ella Diakite) are frequent customers at Frock 'n' Roll waiting for their costumes after Nuzzle and Scratch test them out delivering them on time.

== Episodes ==
Series One.	No. of Series Episodes
1	20
2	13
3	20

=== Episode list ===
Nuzzle (performed by Neil Sterenberg), Scratch (performed by Dave Chapman) and The Boss (Eve De Leon Allen) appear in all of the episodes. These do not appear in the 'Other Credits' column.

#	Title	Overview
Series 1: 2008
1	Window Cleaner	Nuzzle and Scratch help out window cleaner Bob Sheen and make quite a splash. When they are trying to clean the window off the new shop, Nuzzle falls off the ladder and rubs his fur against the window, which makes it clean.
2	Swimming Pool	Nuzzle and Scratch make quite a splash when they help lifeguard Terry Towling get ready for a swimming gala. While trying to swim, Nuzzle saves the Mayor when she fell into the water, by Scratch's "herding" and the Mayor awards Nuzzle "the best lifeguard" rosette.
3	Hairdresser	Playing hair gel hockey and dying her customers' hair blue is not what Clarissa Snips expected when she employed Nuzzle and Scratch to help out at her hairdressing salon. But the boy is so pleased with his great hair-do he tells all his friends and the hairdressing salon soon has a long queue of children.
4	Beach Attendant	Helping beach attendant Mr. Sandy Bottom is more like a holiday than working as far as Nuzzle and Scratch are concerned, especially as they're able to get Mr. Sandy Bottom to do most of the work. While Nuzzle and Scratch are thinking what sandcastle to make for the competition the mayor loses his gold chain. Nuzzle eventually finds it.
5	Cinema	Nuzzle and Scratch help out at the local cinema, but when they treat the new film as a frisbee, they decide to make their own film.
6	Dinner Ladies	Nuzzle and Scratch help a dinner lady make lunch, but then put furballs in the food.
7	Laundry	Nuzzle and Scratch help out at the laundrette. They wash the dry-clean only fancy dress costumes and they shrink. But the Boss is happy as the costumes are just the right size for her.
8	The School Caretakers	While trying to help the school caretaker, Nuzzle and Scratch get in trouble. They buff the school floor too much and make it really slippery.
9	Hotel	Nuzzle and Scratch help at the Hotel Majestic. They get a room ready for a celebrity, but "mess" it up. When the celebrity walks in, she loves it.
10	Magician	When the Boss hears that magician, David Potterfield, can make anything disappear she is more than happy to send Nuzzle and Scratch along to help out.
11	Camping	Adventure camp leader Mr. Merryweather finds himself getting very muddy and covered in fur balls when Nuzzle and Scratch are employed to be his new assistants. However, when the camp leader oversleeps, he wakes to find that Nuzzle and Scratch have done all the activities with the children and he is very pleased.
12	Sports Day	Nuzzle and Scratch are supposed to be organizing the school sports day, but one of their first hurdles is what type of egg to use for the egg and spoon race. Should it be fried or scrambled? The last race is the pupil/teacher race which so far, the sports teacher has always won, however Nuzzle substitutes for one of the children and wins the prize.
13	Painting and Decorating*	Nuzzle and Scratch are employed to help decorate the Boss's flat - they had better not mess up this time! They cause so much trouble the painter cannot get the work done and when the Boss arrives to inspect the work, Nuzzle and Scratch quickly try to paint the whole room but flick paint splatters all over the wall, the Boss however, loves it as it matches her new picture she bought.
14	Ice Cream Van	When Nuzzle and Scratch work the ice cream van, they get a little more ice cream than they'd bargained for. The Whippety Whips lady is pleased with them until she opens the ice cream van door and gets covered in ice cream.
15	Orchestra	Nuzzle and Scratch are employed to play in an orchestra, but the conductor is unimpressed when they play their instruments. The conductor accidentally gets trapped and misses the performance. Nuzzle and Scratch are trying to swot a fly and unintentionally conduct the orchestra beautifully.
16	Park Keeper	Nuzzle and Scratch are employed to help rid a park of moles, but the park keeper soon realizes he has added to his pest problems. In the end, they realize that the moles don't like noise and they complete the task that was set.
17	Rugby	Nuzzle and Scratch are supposed to be doing the Car wash for all other adults to clean cars.
18	Supermarket	Nuzzle and Scratch dream of working on the checkouts at the supermarket, but they need to earn their happy helper badges first.
19	Theme Park	When a special celebrity (Mr Tumble) arrives to open the theme park, Nuzzle and Scratch certainly give him the ride of his life.
20	Library	Nuzzle and Scratch enjoy working at the library, but the librarian is not quite sure about them when she catches Scratch trying to file the books with a nail file. The children love Nuzzle and Scratch story time and the librarian begs them to stay, but they never do as they have to get back to the Boss to 'help' her out with more jobs.
Series 2: 2010
21	Hot Stuff	
22	Gnomes and Gardens	
23	Yucky Stuff	
24	Water, Water Everywhere	
25	On the Road	
26	Sharp Objects	
27	Pens, Doors and Soggy Paws	
28	Here's Looking at Chew	
29	In the Car	
30	Highs and Lows	
31	Slips and Trips	
32	At the Supermarket	
33	On the Buses	
Series 3: 2011
34	Police Officers	
35	Gnomes	
36	Town Criers	
37	Sheepdogs	
38	Superheroes	
39	Explorers	
40	Nurses	
41	Knights	
42	Robots	
43	Princesses	
44	Bakers	
45	Cowboys	
46	Astronauts	
47	Lollipop Ladies	
48	Dancers	
49	Builders	
50	Train Guards	
51	Cheerleaders	
52	Carrots	
53	Pantomime Horse	

== Spin-off ==
A spin-off called Hoof and Safety With Nuzzle and Scratch premiered airing on CBeebies on 1 March 2010. It ran for 13 episodes every day except Wednesday until 22 March 2010. Nuzzle And Scratch learn how to be safe with the help of Miss Mulberry (Sally Bankes). A Second spin-off Nuzzle and Scratch: Frock and Roll premiered on CBeebies on 7 February 2011. It ran for 20 episodes and ended on 4 March 2011. Nuzzle and Scratch have landed a Job at the Frock And Roll Fancy Dress Shop owned by Captain Carrington (Ian Kirkby). With Costumes for every occasion mostly for the Twins (Eva and Ella Diakite), each day brings a new opportunity for adventure. They also Aired On CBeebies.
