= And Then You Die (game show) =

- Presented by: Barrie Stardust
- Country of origin: United Kingdom
- No. of series: 1
- No. of episodes: 8

Production
- Running time: 30 minutes
- Production company: Granada

Original release
- Network: Dave
- Release: 4 December 2007 – 22 January 2008

And Then You Die is a British comedy panel show broadcast on Dave between 4 December 2007 and 22 January 2008. It was hosted by a puppet called Barrie Stardust who is puppeteered by Dave Chapman. It was one of Dave's first attempts at original programming, the channel having only launched earlier in the same year.

And Then You Die focuses on the theme of life's low points and celebrities. Each episode featured alternating teams of two and had no regular team captains. Guests that have appeared on the show include John Moloney, Jo Caulfield, Robin Ince, Adam Bloom, Stephen K. Amos, Rufus Hound, Mark Dolan, Rob Rouse, Kirsten O'Brien among others.

== Reception ==
According to the Dave website (whose editors quite openly asked for public opinion of the show) and respective message board for the programme itself, public opinion is mixed, with most contributors giving negative feedback on the show.

The show was named "The Worst British TV Panel Show / Satire 2007" in The Comedy.co.uk Awards.
