= Morning wood =

"Morning wood" is one of several similar slang or colloquial terms referring to the phenomenon of nocturnal penile tumescence (erection during and immediately following sleep).

Morning wood or Morningwood may refer to:

== Music ==
- Morning Wood, 1994 hard rock album by Tony Harnell and others
- Morning Wood, 1995 debut rock album by The Rugburns
- Morning Wood, 2000 country album by Rodney Carrington
- Morningwood, alternative rock band from New York City
  - Morningwood (album), 2006 debut album of the eponymous rock band

== Television ==
- Morningwood Condominiums, the fictional residence of Peter Gibbons in the film Office Space
- "The Mystery of Morning Wood", a 1995 episode of the MTV animated comedy series Beavis and Butt-head
- Morningwood Academy, an academy Chris joins in the Family Guy episode "No Chris Left Behind"

== Other ==
- Morning Wood, a controversial t-shirt worn by Dick and Dom in 2004

== See also ==
- Nocturnal emission, a spontaneous sleep orgasm
