= The Slammer =

British children's television series

- Also known as: The Slammer Returns (2013–2014)
- Genre: Children's; Talent show Sitcom
- Starring: Ted Robbins; Lee Barnett; Dave Chapman; Ian Kirkby; Melvin Odoom
- Country of origin: United Kingdom
- Original language: English
- No. of series: 6
- No. of episodes: 76

Production
- Production location: dock10 studios
- Running time: 30 minutes
- Production company: CBBC Production

Original release
- Network: CBBC
- Release: 22 September 2006 – 26 July 2014

The Slammer (also known as The Slammer Returns for its final two series) is a talent show for children that was broadcast on CBBC from 22 September 2006 until 26 July 2014.

Set in a fictional prison, HMP The Slammer, the programme follows a variety show format in which "prisoners" who have been arrested for "showbiz related crimes" compete, by performing to an audience, to decide which act should be released.

The series is produced by Steve Ryde, who also produced CBBC's Dick & Dom in da Bungalow and its spin-off, Harry Batt. It was based on an item from Dick and Dom called "The Strangely Talented", a game in which contestants performed their specialised acts in front of the "Bungalow Heads" to try to win the title of "Strangely Talented Champion".

Some of the supporting cast of Dick and Dom in Da Bungalow appear in The Slammer: Dave Chapman, Ian Kirkby, Lee Barnett and Melvin Odoom.

The show returned, after a two-year absence, to CBBC in October 2013, under the new name of The Slammer Returns. Special editions of the show, including The Slammer by the Sea, aired during the revived series.

On 2 June 2016, Ian Kirkby announced that the new series had ended, stating: "[U]nfortunately CBBC have retired the Governor and Mr Burgess, probably for good...but, never say never!"

== Summary ==
=== Storyline ===
HMP The Slammer is a fictitious prison for entertainers who have "committed crimes against showbusiness"; the inmates are given the chance to earn their freedom by performing to a jury of children in "The Freedom Show".

The opening titles introduce the show's format, showing entertainers' acts going wrong, their incarceration, "polishing up their act", and performing to an audience of 8–12 year olds. The lyrics describe this process and the titles conclude with a line of released tap-dancers shimmying out of the prison gate. British illusionist Andrew Van Buren makes three appearances in the titles of the first four series.

The Slammer is headed by the "Governor," played by comedian Ted Robbins. The Governor always wears a white suit with a golden bow tie, and fulfils his duties by hosting "The Freedom Show" and occasionally quizzing audience members about their views on the "Performing Prisoners".

Supporting the Governor are prison wardens Frank Burgess, played by Ian Kirkby, and the Governor's dim-witted nephew, Jeremy Gimbert, played by Lee Barnett. The characters are complete opposites to each other: Burgess is intelligent and trustworthy, and follows procedure and instructions carefully, accompanied by the physical mannerisms of Porridge's Mr Mackay. Gimbert is not the sharpest tool in the box and Burgess's frustration with his colleague's stupidity is often obvious.

Dave Chapman plays Peter Nokio, a long-term resident of HMP The Slammer. He is a poor ventriloquist (his mouth moves when the puppet is speaking), having several puppets that he keeps personified at all times, allowing the puppets to make rude comments and reveal when Peter is telling a lie.

Peter's cell-mate, Melvin (played by Melvin Odoom), is a former dancer whose act once went badly wrong in front of The Queen at the Royal Variety Performance, resulting in his suffering from seemingly incurable stage-fright.

The show begins with 5–10 minutes of storyline with these characters, often introducing celebrity guests who may play themselves or assume characters. Keith Harris and Orville once starred in a story in which a performance had gone so badly that they froze and were taken to HMP The Slammer; the supporting cast managed to revive them and they performed later in the show.

=== "The Freedom Show" ===
After this, the performances begin. After each performance, the Governor and Mr Burgess ask a few children for their thoughts. Traditionally, Mr Burgess asks a child to sum up the act in one word, before shouting it back to the Governor, addressing him as "Sir!". This is often found amusing and has led to children frequently creating nonsense words such as "brillitastic", as Mr Burgess would then have to shout "Brillitastic, Sir!".

Sometimes, the stories are continued into the performance section. Between acts, the television audience cuts away to very short segments of the stories. This usually is done to create tension in stories in which one of the prisoners is being devious (a prisoner is trying to escape while the guards are distracted, for example).

Four acts perform in each episode, and the act that gets the most support through applause and cheering (measured by a clap-o-meter when a vote is taken at the end of the show) is released.

=== Solitary confinement ===
Series 3 introduced a new item called "solitary confinement". This follows the prisoners who have supposedly been placed in solitary confinement for bad performances throughout the years. They are brought out and a child is chosen to watch their act. The child then decides whether the performer gets a "thumbs up" or a "thumbs down".

If they get a "thumbs up", the prisoner is allowed out of solitary confinement and a cell upgrade. However, if they get a "thumbs down", they are sent back to solitary confinement for a "cruel and unusual punishment" from the staff.

== Cast and characters ==
Character	Played by	Series					
Character	Played by	The Slammer (2006–2011)				The Slammer Returns (2013–2014)	
Character	Played by	1	2	3	4	5	6
The Governor	Ted Robbins	Main	Main	Main	Main	Main	Main
Frank Burgess	Ian Kirkby	Main	Main	Main	Main	Main	Main
Jeremy Gimbert	Lee Barnett	Main	Main	Main	Main		
Holly Meadows	Scarlet Hazeldine					Main	Main
Peter Nokio	Dave Chapman	Main	Main	Main	Main		
Melvin Odoom	Himself	Main	Main				

== Production ==
Early series of The Slammer were recorded at 3 Mills Studios in East London, by the BBC, in high definition.

Series 3 and 4 were recorded at Elstree Film Studios in Borehamwood. For series 5 and 6, episodes were recorded at dock10 in Salford.

The prison door used in the series was filmed in Swansea, on Oystermouth Road, where HM Prison Swansea is located.

== Theme tune ==
As with Dick and Dom in Da Bungalow, Andy Blythe and Marten Joustra were commissioned to write the theme.

== Awards ==
In November 2007, The Slammer won the Children's BAFTA for Best Entertainment Programme.

== Celebrity guests ==
The Slammer has featured many celebrity guests (usually entertainers) who play either themselves or characters in the storyline, perform or do both.

In 2006, the show was reprimanded by television regulator Ofcom after a complaint had been received regarding a performance in which a mime artist put a rubber glove over his head, eyes and nose and blew it up. Ofcom formally recorded a breach against the show, as it was felt that the sketch, particularly the performer's use of the glove, was presented as "slapstick fun" and could be easily imitated by young children.

== Episodes ==
=== Series 1 ===
- "Episode 1"
- "Episode 2"
- "Episode 3"
- "Episode 4"
- "Episode 5"
- "Hallowe'en Special"
- "Episode 7"
- "Episode 8"
- "Episode 9"
- "Episode 10"
- "Episode 11"
- "Episode 12"
- "Episode 13"
- "Episode 14"
- "Episode 15"

=== Series 2 ===
- "Episode 1"
- "Episode 2"
- "Episode 3"
- "Episode 4"
- "Episode 5"
- "Episode 6"
- "Episode 7"
- "Episode 8"
- "Episode 9"
- "Episode 10"
- "Episode 11"
- "Episode 12"
- "Episode 13"

=== Series 3 ===
Episode	Title
1	"It's a Puppet"
2	"Breaking In"
3	"Chicken Fever"
4	"Strike"
5	"Quizzee Rascal"
6	"Who is the Governor?"
7	"Slammer Power"
8	"Gov on the Run"
9	"Laughing on the Inside"
10	"The Lost Laugh"
11	"Good Isn't It?"
12	"Walkies"
13	"Tough Nut"
14	"Highlights Show"
15	"A Slammer Christmas"

=== Series 4 ===
Episode	Title
1	"Sleepy Ted"
2	"Trouble in Store"
3	"Slammer Grannies"
4	"The Dragon"
5	"Dressed to Impress"
6	"Governor Gimbert"
7	"The Wrong Impression"
8	"Miners Strike"
9	"Home for Magic Rabbits"
10	"Angry Puppets"
11	"Stuck on You"
12	"The Broken Vent"
13	"Slammer Uncovered"

=== Series 5 ===
Episode	Title
1	"Officer Meadows"
2	"The Ballonatic"
3	"Buzzkill the Human Fly"
4	"Slammer Symphony"
5	"Come Lie with Me"
6	"Slammer on Sea"
7	"A Monster Problem"
8	"Sylvester the Jester"
9	"At Home with the Governor"
10	"Slammer Claus"

=== Series 6 ===
Episode	Title
1	"Mumble & Son"
2	"Bad Burgess"
3	"Polly Meadows"
4	"X Marks the Spot Factor"
5	"Poster Paint"
6	"Naughty Nephew"
7	"Master of Disguise"
8	"Slammer Staff Spectacular"
9	"So You Want to be the Governor?"
10	"Solitary Confinement"

== Transmissions ==
Series	Start date	End date	Episodes
1	22 September 2006	5 January 2007	15
2	28 March 2008	20 June 2008	13
3	10 September 2010	17 December 2010	15
4	16 September 2011	9 December 2011	13
5	11 October 2013	20 December 2013	10
6	16 May 2014	26 July 2014	10
