= Ian Kirkby =

British actor and writer

Ian Kirby
- Born: 28 November 1968 (age 57)
- Occupations: Actor, writer
- Years active: 1983 - present
- Known for: Harry Batt in Dick and Dom in da Bungalow

Ian Kirkby (born 28 November 1968) is a British actor and writer. He is best known for his role as DI Harry Batt on the children's programme Dick & Dom in da Bungalow and Diddy TV and Sandy Toes on Swashbuckle. Additionally, he has appeared in Diddy Movies and The Slammer.

== Career ==
In his early years, Kirkby became a member of the Central Junior Television Workshop. From there he was selected as an extra in 1987 in ITV sitcom, Hardwicke House. In 1992, Kirkby graduated from the Royal Academy of Dramatic Art and was employed in a number of minor roles in theatre and television productions. He also spent a year with the Royal Shakespeare Company and performed in the West End. In 2003, Kirkby was hired by the BBC to play Newcastle detective, Harry Batt on CBBC's Dick and Dom in da Bungalow. Kirkby said he based the character of Harry Batt on a "Seventies Sweeney stereotype, but with a Geordie accent." The character was only intended to be a one-time appearance; however, the character became popular so Kirkby reprised the role as a recurring character and a regular actor until the end of the programme in 2006. Kirkby also played Harry Batt in Da Dick and Dom Dairies and The Legend of Dick and Dom. During this time, he also co-wrote a programme for CBBC based around Harry Batt, which was broadcast in 2007.

Also in 2006, in a role that Kirkby was permitted to write for himself, played the role of Mr. Burgess in the talent programme The Slammer. In 2010, Kirkby was hired by Channel 4 to play commentator Terry McIlroy in the comedy Pete versus Life.

== Personal life ==
Kirkby is a fan of association football; however, he had expressed a dislike of motor racing as "just a waste of petrol".

== Filmography ==
=== Television ===
Year	Series	Role	Notes
1983–1989	Dramarama	Various characters	Appeared in four episodes
1985–1988	Your Mother Wouldn't Like It	Loaf	Main cast member
1987	Hardwicke House	Unnamed pupil	
1988	Hard Cases	Peter Collinson	
1990	Palace Hill	Chelsea Bun Appeared in all seven episodes	
1994	Pie in the Sky	Second Police Constable	Episode 1.7: "Passion Fruit Fool"
1995	Peak Practice	Edward Turrell	Episode 3.12: "Giving Up"
1998	Picking up the Pieces	Peter	Episode 1.8
2000	Doctors	Graham Tremain	Episode 2.52
2003	Dangerville	Jack Jackson Appeared in thirteen episodes	
2004–2006	Dick and Dom in da Bungalow	Various characters	Appeared in the majority of series 3 and all the episodes of series 4 and 5
2004	55 Degrees North	Jack Timson	Episode 1.3
2005	Wire in the Blood	Steve Bentley	Episode 3.4: "Synchronicity"
2005	Julian Fellowes Investigates: A Most Mysterious Murder – The Case of Rose Harsent	Albert Goodchild	
2006–15	The Slammer	Mr. Burgess	Appeared in all episodes
2006	Mayo	Joe Wishart	Episode 1.6
2006	Coronation Street	Simon Stevens	Appeared in four episodes
2007	Harry Batt	Harry Batt	Also writer
2007	Casualty	Pete Frampton	Episode 22.18: "Take a Cup of Kindness Yet" and 22.19: "For Auld Lang Syne"
2008	Uncle Max	Biker dad	Episode 2.9: "Uncle Max at the Supermarket"
2009–2010	The Legend of Dick and Dom	Appeared in all three series playing over 40 characters	
2009–2010	Nuzzle and Scratch	Mr Sandy Bottom	Episode 4: "Beach Attendant"
2009	Gigglebiz	Cinema Manager/Mayor/Janitor	3 episodes
2010	Pete versus Life	Terry McIlroy	All 5 episodes
2012-2014	Diddy Movies	Various	
2016–2018	Diddy TV	Harry Batt/Various	All 19 episodes
2016	Sam & Mark's Big Friday Wind-Up	Mr. Burgess	Guest
2016	Rank the Prank	Various characters	2 episode
2016	CBBC HQ	Harry Batt	Guest
2020	Crackerjack!	Various Characters	
2021–2022	Swashbuckle	Sandy Toes	

=== Films ===
Year	Film	Role	Notes
1997	Jilting Joe	Traffic Cop	
1999	Whatever Happened to Harold Smith?	Policeman	
2008	My Last Five Girlfriends	Tour guide	
