= Ted Robbins =

British radio personality (born 1955)

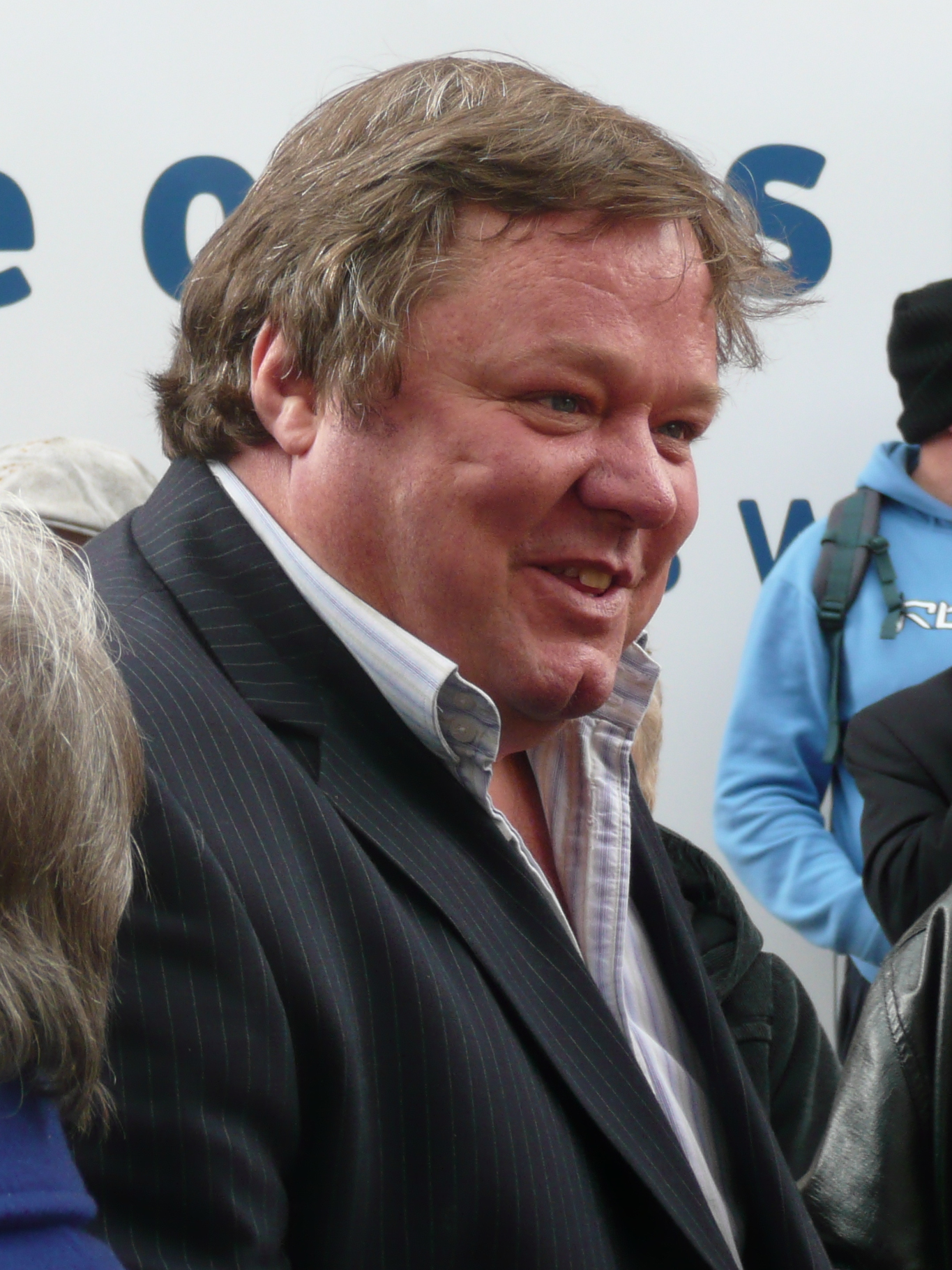
- Robbins at the unveiling of Fred Dibnah's statue in 2008
- Born: Edward Michael Robbins; 11 August 1955 (age 71); Liverpool, England
- Education: University of Liverpool
- Occupations: Comedian; actor; broadcaster; radio DJ; radio personality; television personality
- Years active: 1984–present
- Spouse: Judy Robbins
- Children: 2
- Relatives: Ted Robbins (grandfather); Paul McCartney (first cousin once removed); Kate Robbins (sister); Amy Robbins (sister); Emily Atack (niece)

Edward Michael Robbins (born 11 August 1955) is an English comedian, actor, broadcaster, radio DJ, television presenter and radio personality.

== Career ==
He has performed as a warm-up artist for numerous pre-recorded comedy shows that have been filmed before live studio audiences including Granada Television's Wood and Walters and Birds of a Feather, provided the voiceover in series 10 of Catchphrase from 1994 to 1995 and returned in Roy Walker's penultimate series (series 12) in 1997–1998, and the BBC's Little Britain. He also starred in Peter Kay's Phoenix Nights (2001–02) for both series as Den Perry, the main "villain", and also the Governor in The Slammer. His most recent roles were in Benidorm in 2012 as Victor St. James as well as Hank Zipzer in episode 8 playing Bob Bing the Sausage King and Diddy TV playing Larry Weinsteinberger/Bingbongberger. In 2004, he played Don Dibley in series 13 episode 11 of Heartbeat, "Mountains and Molehills".

He guest starred as Barry Quid in Series 10 of Birds of a Feather and also in the comedy series The League of Gentlemen as Tony Cluedo, singer of Crème Brulée.

He also narrated The Railway Series books by Christopher Awdry for audio cassette.

In 2020, Robbins appeared on the rebooted version of Crackerjack! as one of the "Crackerjack Players".

== Personal life ==
Robbins is a supporter of Rossendale RUFC, where his son, Jack, played as a prop. He is also a supporter of Wrexham AFC as was his father.

Robbins is also the President of Bleakholt Animal Sanctuary in Edenfield, Lancashire. Robbins is the brother of actresses Kate and Amy Robbins and a first cousin once removed of Paul McCartney. His grandfather, also named Ted, served as secretary of the Football Association of Wales between 1909 and 1946.

Robbins has performed in panto at the Charter Theatre, Preston and in 2014 he performed in Cinderella at the Plaza Cinema in Stockport, returning to play Widow Twanky in Aladdin in 2017. He also performed in Cinderella at the Liverpool Empire in 2008.

On 31 January 2015, Robbins suffered a cardiac arrest and collapsed on stage, clutching his chest, during his solo sketch at the opening night of the Phoenix Nights Live tour at the Manchester Arena. His health has improved since then, with the actor losing seven stone (44kg).

== Filmography ==
=== Film ===
Year	Title	Role	Notes
2003	Calendar Girls	Fat Bike Man	

=== Television ===
Year	Title	Role	Notes
1987	Kate and Ted's Show	Various characters	7 episodes
1988	The Kate Robbins Show	Various characters	6 episodes
1995	Chain Letters	Presenter	
1999	The League Of Gentlemen	Tony Cluedo	
2000	Coronation Street	DJ	
2001–2002	Phoenix Nights	Den Perry	8 episodes
2003	Little Britain	Ensemble Actor and Warm up Man	
2006–2015	The Slammer	The Governor	78 episodes
2006	Two Pints of Lager and a Packet of Crisps	Talent Scout	
2008	ChuckleVision	Beetle Fan	
2007	Prank Patrol	Talent Show Judge	
2011	Come Fly with Me	Drunk Pilot	
2011–2017	Mount Pleasant	Terry	18 episodes
2012	Benidorm	Victor St. James	1 episode
2012	Bad Education	Paul	Series 1 Episode 4; "School Trip"
2012–2014	Diddy Movies	Larry Weinsteinberger	15 episodes
2014	Hank Zipzer	Bob Bing	1 episode
2015–2016	Coronation Street	Brendan Finch	
2015	All at Sea	Santa Claus	1 episode
2016–2018	Diddy TV	Larry Bingbongberger/Various	
2017	The Other One	Taxi Driver	1 episode: "Pilot"
2018	Ackley Bridge	Ray Carter	32 episodes
2020	Shakespeare & Hathaway: Private Investigators	Joseph JJ Jacques	1 episode
2022	Father Brown	Jock McCudgeon	1 episode

=== Audiobooks ===
Year	Title	Role	Notes
1994–1995	The Railway Series	Narrator	Volumes 27–38

Preceded by Allan Stewart	Host of Chain Letters; 1995	Succeeded by Vince Henderson
