= Steve Ryde =

English actor, voice-over artist and producer

Steven Ryde is an English actor, voice-over artist and television producer. He has worked mainly in children's television and appeared as Tatty Bogle from 1994 to 1998 in the children's TV series Wizadora.

Other television programmes include Your Mother Wouldn't Like It, and Palace Hill, a spin-off from YMWLI, playing Jimmy the Time Warp Kid.

In 1993, Ryde provided the voice-over links between programmes for a partially revamped Children's ITV, essentially as an off-screen presenter. In 1998, Ryde was offered the producer's role for the children's programming strand, and was charged with another relaunch of CITV as it returned to in-vision presenters.

In 1997, he co-wrote and appeared in the short film Suckers. Between 2002 and 2006, he produced the CBBC programme Dick and Dom in Da Bungalow in which he was also the commentator for the game "Bogies". The programme won BAFTA awards for Best Entertainment Show and Best Presenters. The Slammer (2006–2007) won a Children's BAFTA for Best Entertainment Programme in 2007, and Sam and Mark's Big Friday Wind Up (2016–2017) later won the same award, while Diddy Movies (2013–2014) won a BAFTA award for Children's Comedy.

Ryde produced the CBBC children's shows The Slammer (2006), Harry Batt (2007), Chute! (2007), The Legend of Dick & Dom (2009), Dick and Dom's Hoopla (2012), The Slammer Returns (2013), Diddy TV (2016) and Crackerjack (2020).
