= Joe Mace =

British TV producer & presenter (b.1971)

- Mace at the Greek national Football Team Museum in Chania, Crete
- Born: 10 October 1971 (age 54); London, England
- Occupations: Television producer and presenter
- Employer: ITV Studios
- Height: 5 ft 11.5 in (1.816 m)

Joe Mace (born 10 October 1971) is a British television producer and presenter.

== Professional life ==
After co-devising and producing Mighty Truck of Stuff, a children's TV show for independent UK producer Endemol, Mace then undertook the role of head of Entertainment Development for Children's BBC, where his credits included Hotel Trubble, Copycats and Help! Teach is Coming to Stay.

In 2008 Mace became the head of entertainment development at the BBC, where highlights included Tonight's the Night, Totally Saturday and Eurovision, Your Country Needs You!. In 2012, Joe became ITV Studios head of development. His credits since include: Fool Britannia, Stepping Out, Get Your Act Together, Keep It in the Family, Meet the Parents and Love Island for ITV and One Hundred and Eighty for Sky1. In April 2016, Mace was promoted to Commissioner, Entertainment, ITV, where his commissions have included The Masked Singer, Deal or No Deal, Genius Game, and Beat the Chasers.

Before becoming a producer, Mace presented TV shows including Come Fly with Me, Top of the Pops Plus, The Saturday Show, The Holiday Show, and The Album Chart Show. In 1999, Mace co-wrote and co-starred alongside best friend Ben Dunn in a six-part sitcom, Joe's Pop Shop, which appeared on BBC Worldwide's UK Play channel. In 2023, Mace took his one-man-show Wedding Bingo to the Edinburgh Fringe Festival.

== Personal life ==
Mace was born one of two children in October 1971 in Kennington, London, and is a lifelong fan of the football club West Ham United. He currently resides in Clapham, London and is married with two children. In 2014 he achieved a life ambition by completing the Bosphorus Cross Continental Swim, a 6.5 km race, while dressed in full West Ham kit. Mace is related to the famous bare-knuckle fighter Gypsy Jem Mace, the reputed father of boxing, and is one of the U.K.'s foremost amateur leather turners. He was recently honoured by The Greek National Football Team Museum (as pictured) for his work.
