= Diddy Movies =

British children's television series

- Genre: Comedy
- Starring: Richard McCourt; Dominic Wood; Ted Robbins
- Country of origin: United Kingdom
- No. of series: 2
- No. of episodes: 15

Production
- Running time: 15 minutes approx.
- Production company: CBBC Productions

Original release
- Network: CBBC
- Release: 19 March 2012 – 7 March 2014

Related
- Diddy TV

Diddy Movies is a British children's comedy series on CBBC. It stars Richard McCourt and Dominic Wood (Dick and Dom) alongside Ted Robbins, and is a continuation of the Diddy Dick and Dom sketches from Dick & Dom in da Bungalow. The series features fictional blockbuster movies headlined by the duo of Dick and Dom. Series 1 began on 19 March 2012, a Christmas special was aired on 19 December 2013 and Series 2 began on 4 March 2014. Many of the cast have been in other Dick and Dom sketch series or the sitcom The Legend of Dick and Dom.

In 2016, the series was followed by Diddy TV, in which Diddy Dick and Dom run their own television station.

== Background ==
The series was announced by Dick and Dom on Something for the Weekend in 2012.

== Premise ==
Diddy Dick and Dom have come to Hollywood to make movies with the backing of studio boss Larry Weinsteinberger. Each episode shows them attending the premiere of their latest film. Their movies, which rely heavily on toilet humour and blatantly rip off more popular works, are invariably met with disgust and outrage from the audience. Nevertheless, Diddy Dick and Dom always manage to convince Larry to finance their next production.

== Cast ==
- Richard McCourt as Diddy Dick/Various
- Dominic Wood as Diddy Dom/Various
- Ted Robbins as Larry Weinsteinburger

== Episodes ==
Series	Episodes	Originally released	
Series	Episodes	First released	Last released
1	10	19 March 2012	30 March 2012
2	5	19 December 2013	7 March 2014

=== Series 1 (2012) ===
No. overall	No. in series	Title	Directed by	Written by	Original release date
1	1	"Disaster Strikes!"	Julian Kemp	Carl Carter; Tony Cooke	19 March 2012
The Diddies are on the most accident-prone plane in the skies. Will they survive storms, a shark in the luggage and the captain flushing himself down the loo?
2	2	"The Beast of Black Island"	Julian Kemp	Carl Carter; Tony Cooke	20 March 2012
The intrepid Diddy heroes find themselves face to face with the legendary 'Beast' - a creature so fearsome that no-one dare even speak his name.
3	3	"Space!"	Julian Kemp	Carl Carter; Tony Cooke	21 March 2012
A princess from another world needs help. Only the crew of the Diddy Star ship can save her from the planet of the Space Weevils.
4	4	"Hollywood High: The Musical"	Julian Kemp	Carl Carter; Tony Cooke	22 March 2012
Diddy Britney and Diddy Whitney are both in love with Diddy Brad. Which one will get him to take her to the school prom?
5	5	"Fight! The Way of the Wedgie"	Julian Kemp	Carl Carter; Tony Cooke	23 March 2012
Only the bravest, the strongest and the most cunning can win the title of Champion of Kung Boo.
6	6	"Draculaaa!"	Julian Kemp	Carl Carter; Tony Cooke	26 March 2012
The Diddies spend the night with a rather toothy host. Why does he keep staring at their diddy necks?
7	7	"Bumbly Poo Farm"	Julian Kemp	Ciaran Murtagh; Andrew Jones	27 March 2012
Young Diddy Jess is off to spend a day at his uncle's farm. Little does he know, the wicked Bumbly Poo has his mind set on mischief.
8	8	"Murder on the Norwich Express"	Julian Kemp	Carl Carter; Tony Cooke	28 March 2012
The famous detective Francois le Fondue is on the trail of the deadly Mooner. Will anyone on the train survive?
9	9	"Human-man"	Julian Kemp	Ben Ward	29 March 2012
Journalist Clint Cant is bitten by a radioactive man, giving him all the powers... of a man.
10	10	"That's Diddytainment"	Dez McCarthy; Julian Kemp	N/A	30 March 2012
A round up of Diddy Dick and Dom's greatest movie moments! A feast of luvvie laughter. Note: This is a compilation episode.

=== Series 2 (2013–2014) ===
No. overall	No. in series	Title	Directed by	Written by	Original release date
11	1	"High Broom/A Christmas Christmas Movie"	Dez McCarthy	Carl Carter; Tony Cooke	19 December 2013
A classic western, then the future of Christmas is at stake when Santa turns out to be an evil mechanical robot, it's up to Jolly Elf and Merry Elf to save Christmas!
12	2	"Chewrassic Park/My Husband Stinks"	Dez McCarthy	Carl Carter; Tony Cooke; Ben Ward	4 March 2014
Our heroes win a trip to a theme park, and celebrity Bo Diddy accidentally gets married.
13	3	"Zombie Grannies/Krakowski and Da Pooch"	Dez McCarthy	Carl Carter; Ciaran Murtagh; Andrew Jones	5 March 2014
Residents of a retirement home turn into zombies and a New York cop gets a new partner.
14	4	"2 Dimensions - A Rockumentary/Invasion"	Dez McCarthy	Ciaran Murtagh; Andrew Jones; Tony Cooke	6 March 2014
A rockumentary charts the rise and fall of a boy band and two alien races invade Earth.
15	5	"The Golden Diddies/That's Diddytainment"	Dez McCarthy; Julian Kemp	N/A	7 March 2014
Diddy Dick, Diddy Dom and Larry Weinsteinberger attend the prestigious annual Golden Diddy Awards. Note: This is a compilation episode featuring a rerun of That's Diddytainment from series 1.
