= Dick & Dom in da Bungalow =

British children's TV series (2002–2006)

- Genre: Children's
- Presented by: Richard McCourt; Dominic Wood
- Starring: Melvin Odoom; Ian Kirkby; Dave Chapman; Lee Barnett
- Country of origin: United Kingdom
- Original language: English
- No. of series: 5
- No. of episodes: 263

Production
- Production location: BBC Television Centre
- Running time: 180 minutes (2002–03); 120 minutes (2003–06)

Original release
- Network: CBBC; BBC One (2003–2005); BBC Two (2006)
- Release: 31 August 2002 – 11 March 2006

Related
- Da Dick and Dom Dairies (2009); Diddy Movies (2012–14); Diddy TV (2016–2018)

Dick & Dom in da Bungalow is a British children's television series presented by the duo Dick and Dom (Richard McCourt and Dominic Wood). The series was broadcast on weekend mornings for five series on the CBBC Channel, BBC One and BBC Two, running between 31 August 2002 and 11 March 2006.

== Premise ==
Dick & Dom in da Bungalow is a children's television show presented by the duo Dick and Dom (Richard McCourt and Dominic Wood). The show was broadcast live on Saturday and Sunday mornings, with the Saturday shows simulcast on BBC One and the CBBC digital channel, and the Sunday shows airing on the CBBC channel only. Set in Dick and Dom's fictional bungalow, six studio contestants—known as Bungalow Heads—would compete in a series of games and sketches across both days in order to win 'Bungalow Points'.

The contestants with the most Bungalow Points would win prizes. While first and second prizes would usually be desirable items, the contestant in third place would be given a joke prize such as a cake made of carpet, hairy cheese, bottled water from the River Hull or a Mobile Joan. The Bungalow Head with the most points at the end of the Saturday show would win a bonus prize, (Note: In series 5, the grand prize was awarded at the end of the Saturday show, while the winner of the Sunday show would win a bonus prize.) while the one with the fewest points at the end of both shows was sent to the toilet to be gunged.

For series 1–4, the Bungalow Heads were all children aged 8–13 years; in the final series, five children and one celebrity guest were the contestants on the Saturday shows, with a special guest replacing the celebrity on Sunday, often family members and friends but also a cast member of the show in character, such as Darth Vader, Queen Elizabeth I, Godzilla and Mr. Blobby. Young viewers would be able to phone in for a chance to win one of the prizes should they be won by the celebrity Bungalow Head.

In addition to Dick and Dom, the show featured regular cast members Melvin Odoom, Dave Chapman and Ian Kirkby, who would play a variety of characters in each episode. Kirkby played one of the show's recurring characters, Newcastle detective constable Harry Batt, who would regularly investigate suspicious activity on the show and in the Bungalow and would later have his own game on the show, "DC Harry Batt's Interrogation Game". The character would also feature in the series The Legend of Dick and Dom, which began in 2009.

Surreal humour was a strong element throughout the programme, frequently driving the sketches and games and giving the show its distinctive, off‑kilter tone.

=== Recurring features ===
==== Bogies ====
The segment of the show that gained the most notoriety was a pre-recorded game called Bogies. In this game, Dick and Dom situated themselves in a quiet public place such as a museum or restaurant and took turns to shout "bogies" at gradually increasing volumes, until one of them did not shout as loud as the other (judged by a meter on the screen), or quit owing to embarrassment. The commentary for Bogies was provided by the show's producer, Steve Ryde. Later series would see variations on the game including "Parent Bogies", where either Dick or Dom would play the game against a viewer's parent; and "European Bogies", where they played in France, Italy and Spain, shouting the equivalent word for 'Bogies' in each language.

==== Creamy Muck Muck ====
Each Saturday show would feature a sketch or game that would revolve around the hosts, contestants and characters throwing "creamy muck muck" (custard) all around the set and at each other, which would be instigated on the signal of "Go, Go, Go!" The fight would be set to the opening verse of "Ace of Spades" by Motörhead. For series five, each Saturday show ended with a muck-themed parody of a popular game show such as Deal or No Deal or The Weakest Link, with the Bungalow Heads in first to third place competing with those in fourth to sixth place, who would swap places correspondingly with the other team if they won the game, before ending in a muck-throwing fight.

==== Forfeit Auction ====
On every Sunday show, Dick would play an auctioneer character, Tom Dickenharry, who would auction off forfeits to the Bungalow Heads to buy using their points. They would then be able to give the forfeit to one of the others to perform, which usually involved either having to perform a task for the remainder of the show, such as reacting sarcastically to everything, or have to participate in an elaborate sketch or challenge while being pelted and covered in food stuffs, including mushy peas and tinned tomatoes.

==== Diddy Dick and Dom ====
Diddy Dick and Dom was a segment in which miniature versions of Dick and Dom (in reality, puppets attached to a black cloak) presented a mini sketch during an intermission of the show. The location for these sketches was in a purple cupboard, and away from the attention of Dick, Dom and the Bungalow Heads, the doors would open to show the duo. These were pre-recorded, and no more than a minute in length. Both Diddy Dick and Diddy Dom spoke with very squeaky voices, edited in post production. The sketches involving Diddy Dick and Diddy Dom tended to be either slapstick humour, puns or, more often than not, toilet humour.

In 2007, a series of 3–4 minute compilations of the sketches were made and shown on CBBC.

==== "No Celebrities Allowed" ====
The main rule of the show at the start of its run was that there were no celebrities allowed in the Bungalow. A running gag for the first four series featured a celebrity either locked in a cage in the basement or found in the attic. Some people who have been in the cage or the attic included Vince Earl, Sarah Greene, John Kettley, Hugo Myatt (as Treguard from ITV's Knightmare), Su Pollard, Bodger and Badger and Peter Simon. This was changed in series five when five Bungalow Heads were joined by a celebrity, the first of whom was Rachel Stevens, who left the set after refusing to take part in the show's finale, Splativersity Challenge. Reports at the time suggested that the presenters had banned Stevens from any live broadcast they would do in the future.

==== Cartoons ====
Every episode would be broken up by cartoons (and sometimes live-action shows) shown throughout each episode, which included during the course of the show's run:

- The Fairly OddParents
- What's New, Scooby-Doo?
- Krypto the Superdog
- The Cramp Twins
- ChuckleVision
- BB3B
- The Basil Brush Show
- Super Duper Sumos
- Dennis and Gnasher
- Batfink
- Yvon of the Yukon
- Tom & Jerry Kids
- Maid Marian and Her Merry Men
- Pinky and the Brain
- Looney Tunes
- The New Scooby and Scrappy-Doo Show
- Taz-Mania
- Rentaghost
- Zombie Hotel

== Production ==
McCourt and Wood met while presenting CBBC's in-vision links from Studio TC9 at BBC Television Centre in West London, and were invited to create a new Saturday morning show to air on CBBC's new digital channel after establishing themselves as a double act. The name in da Bungalow was suggested by the BBC as a parody of Ali G Indahouse, and aired directly against SM:TV Live with H and Claire from Steps, and The Saturday Show on BBC One with Fearne Cotton and Simon Grant. After six months, da Bungalow had half a million viewers and moved to BBC One in 2003.

== Controversies ==
The BBC upheld a complaint in August 2004 against Wood and McCourt appearing nearly naked in promotions for the show on the CBBC Channel, deeming the material as beyond acceptable standards.

In September 2004, Ofcom said that the show breached children's programming regulations when Dominic Wood wore a T-shirt with the wording "Morning Wood", a slang term for erections. He said that it was merely a reference to the morning timeslot and his surname. The BBC said that its producers made an error in not objecting to the shirt.

In January 2005, Conservative MP Peter Luff complained about the programme and its website for scatological content to Culture Secretary Tessa Jowell during a session in the House of Commons, and criticised the role of the BBC as a public broadcaster of such content. The BBC responded that the show was entertainment for children aged 8–12 and was well-liked by that demographic, but may not appeal to adults. Luff's attack on the show was frequently parodied in the subsequent episode, aired on 22 January 2005, particularly in a segment titled "Question Muck", inspired by the long-running UK topical debate programme Question Time, with a panel of fictional guests that included a ball of fluff called 'Rt Hon. Pieceof Fluff MP'.

== Transmissions ==
=== Series ===
Series	Start date	End date	Episodes
1	31 August 2002	29 December 2002	36
2	4 January 2003	22 June 2003	51 (Note: Including highlight shows on the 28 and 29 June 2003)
3	20 September 2003	11 April 2004	60
4	11 September 2004	12 March 2005	56 (Note: Including highlight shows on the 13, 19, and 20 March 2005)
5	10 September 2005	11 March 2006	52 (Note: Including highlight shows on the 12, 18, and 19 March 2006)

=== Comic Relief specials ===
A week of specials called Comic Relief in Da Bungalow was aired in 2005 in aid of Comic Relief.

Special	Start date	End date	Episodes
Comic Relief in Da Bungalow	7 March 2005	10 March 2005	8

=== Da Dick and Dom Dairies ===
A series of compilation episodes called Da Dick and Dom Dairies was aired on BBC2 in 2009 with some newly recorded scenes.

Series	Start date	End date	Episodes
1	26 January 2009	20 February 2009	20

== Accolades ==
Year	Award	Category	Nominees	Result	Ref(s)
2003	RTS Programme Awards	Children's Programme	CBBC and BBC One	Nominated	
2004	British Academy Children's Awards	Presenter	Richard McCourt and Dominic Wood	Won	
2004	British Academy Children's Awards	Entertainment	Steve Ryde and Simon Hepworth	Won	
2005	British Academy Children's Awards	Presenter	Richard McCourt and Dominic Wood	Nominated	
2005	British Academy Children's Awards	Entertainment	Steve Ryde and Simon Hepworth	Nominated	

== Spin-offs ==
=== Diddy Dick and Dom on CBBC ===
Short five-minute compilations of the Diddy Dick and Dom sketches were aired as filler programmes on BBC Two and the CBBC Channel after the programme's end.

=== Diddy TV ===
In 2016, another new series aired on CBBC which was a sketch show featuring Diddy Dick and Dom in parodies of various other programmes.

== Future ==
In 2016, producer Steve Ryde has stated that there may be a one-off special in the future. On 14 November 2019, Dick and Dom ran a poll on Twitter asking if viewers would be interested to see a revival of the show, except with adults as contestants.

=== Tour ===
On 26 January 2022, Dick and Dom posted an image of one of the Bungalow's wallpapers on Instagram, with no context. Social media users theorized that this could signify a reboot. On May 3 2022, Dick and Dom posted on their social media pages a video of the Bungalow house logo with the number 5 next to it and with Dick's voice shouting bogies, which began a countdown of other videos posted throughout the day.

The next day it was announced that Dick and Dom in Da Bungalow would be returning as a tour in Autumn 2022 to mark the show's 20th anniversary. Originally slated for Autumn 2022, the tour was delayed to 2023 with added venues across the UK. The live shows would feature many of the same games and characters from the TV show, with audience members being invited to participate on-stage. The tour officially commenced on 11 March 2023 in the Birmingham Town Hall, exactly 17 years to the day since the final episode. When asked in an interview about this, Dick and Dom had not realised this and were pleasantly surprised.
