= Timeline of chart shows on UK radio =

This is a timeline of the history of chart shows on UK radio.

== 1950s ==
- 1952
  - 14 November – The very first UK Singles Chart is compiled, by New Musical Express.
- 1953
  - No events.
- 1954
  - No events.
- 1955
  - 4 October – Pick of the Pops is broadcast on the BBC Light Programme for the first time.
- 1956
  - No events.
- 1957
  - September – For the first time, a chart rundown is broadcast on the radio when the format of running through the charts of the week, playing the top tens from various music papers plus entries to top 20s, is introduced as part of Pick of the Pops.
- 1958
  - 29 March – The first averaged BBC Top 20 is broadcast on Pick of the Pops.
- 1959
  - No events.

== 1960s ==
The only notable event this decade takes place on 1 October 1967 when Pick of the Pops transfers to BBC Radio 1 following the launch the previous day of the new station.

== 1970s ==
- 1970
  - No events.
- 1971
  - No events.
- 1972
  - 24 September – Pick of the Pops is broadcast for the final time.
  - 1 October – The first edition of a new Sunday teatime programme Solid Gold Sixty is broadcast on BBC Radio 1. Presented by Tom Browne, the programme consists of two hours featuring the Radio 1 playlist tracks which were not in the Top 20, followed by a one-hour Top 20 rundown from 6pm to 7pm, which was also carried on BBC Radio 2's FM transmitters.
- 1973
  - No events.
- 1974
  - 17 March – Solid Gold Sixty is broadcast on BBC Radio 1 for the final time. It is replaced the following week by a one-hour programme which just features the Top 20.
- 1975
  - No events.
- 1976
  - No events.
- 1977
  - No events.
- 1978
  - 2 April – Simon Bates replaces Tom Browne as presenter of BBC Radio 1's Sunday teatime chart rundown show.
  - 12 November – The Sunday teatime chart show is extended from a Top 20 countdown to a Top 40 countdown.
- 1979
  - 2 September – Tony Blackburn replaces Simon Bates as host of the Sunday Top 40.

== 1980s ==
- 1980
  - No events.
- 1981
  - No events.
- 1982
  - 10 January – Tommy Vance replaces Tony Blackburn as host of the Sunday Top 40.
  - Pick of the Pops is revived on Capital Radio. Called Pick of the Pops – Take Two, combining the new chart (Top 15s compiled successively by Record Business, the NME and MRIB) with a chart from the past.
- 1983
  - No events.
- 1984
  - 8 January – Simon Bates briefly returns to the Sunday Top 40.
  - 30 September
    - The first edition of The Network Chart Show is broadcast. Aired on almost all of the UK's Independent Local Radio networks, the programme is presented from the studios of Capital Radio by David Jensen.
    - Richard Skinner takes over as host of BBC Radio 1's Sunday Top 40.
- 1985
  - No events.
- 1986
  - 30 March – Following Richard Skinner's departure from BBC Radio 1, Bruno Brookes begins his first stint as the host of the Sunday Top 40.
- 1987
  - 4 October – From this day, the new UK Singles Chart is released on BBC Radio 1's Sunday afternoon chart show. Previously, the programme had played songs from the chart which had been released the previous Tuesday.
- 1988
  - No events.
- 1989
  - Pick of the Pops returns to BBC Radio 1, now featuring a format of three classic charts.

== 1990s ==
- 1990
  - 30 September – Mark Goodier replaces Bruno Brookes as host of BBC Radio 1's Top 40 show.
- 1991
  - 6 January – For the first time, BBC Radio 1's Sunday chart show plays all 40 tracks and is renamed as The Complete Top 40. This becomes possible due to an extension of the programme's duration, starting half an hour earlier at 4:30pm. However, despite the fast presentational style adopted by Mark Goodier, there isn't enough time for every song to be played in full as the programme's length of 2 hours and 29 minutes also has to include the links and chart rundowns.
- 1992
  - Pick of the Pops airs on BBC Radio 1 for the final time.
  - 1 March – Mark Goodier ends his first stint as presenter of BBC Radio 1's Complete UK Top 40.
  - 8 March – Tommy Vance presents this edition of BBC Radio 1's Top 40 show. It is also the final time that the programme runs for 2 and a half hours.
  - 15 March – Bruno Brookes begins his second stint as host of the UK Top 40 show. It is extended once again and now airs from 4pm until 7pm, thereby allowing time for all 40 records to be played in full.
  - 12 September – The first broadcast of a classical music chart takes place as the newly launched Classic FM includes a weekly chart show which is broadcast on Saturday mornings and is presented by Paul Gambaccini.
- 1993
  - 18 April – The Official 1 FM Album Chart show is broadcast for the first time. Presented by Lynn Parsons, the 60-minute programme is broadcast on Sunday evenings, straight after the Top 40 singles chart.
  - 2 May – As part of its launch schedule, new national commercial station Virgin 1215 launches a weekly album chart show.
  - 25 July – The last Network Chart Show goes out on Independent Local Radio.
  - 1 August – 'Doctor' Neil Fox introduces the first Pepsi Network Chart show, a Sunday afternoon Top 40 Countdown show for commercial radio. The top ten is based on sales with positions 11 to 40 based on a combination of single sales and airplay.
- 1994
  - April – Pick of the Pops returns on Capital Gold.
- 1995
  - 23 April – Following Bruno Brookes's departure from BBC Radio 1, Mark Goodier begins his second stint as presenter of the Sunday afternoon Top 40 show.
- 1996
  - September – A rebranding of the commercial radio chart show sees it lose the Network Chart Show branding and is now called the Pepsi Chart.
- 1997
  - 5 April – Pick of the Pops is transferred to BBC Radio 2.
  - 31 August – Regular programming on the BBC's radio and television stations is abandoned to provide ongoing news coverage of the death of Diana, Princess of Wales. Consequently, for the first time, the top 40 show is not broadcast on a Sunday afternoon. The new chart is revealed in a special programme the following day.
- 1998
  - No events.
- 1999
  - No events.

== 2000s ==
- 2000
  - No events.
- 2001
  - No events.
- 2002
  - 17 November – Mark Goodier presents the Top 40 on BBC Radio 1 for the final time on the 50th anniversary of the chart, and leaves the station due to falling audiences and BBC bosses considering him "too old for the job."
  - 29 December – The last edition of the Pepsi Chart Show is broadcast on commercial radio stations across the UK.
- 2003
  - 5 January
    - 'Doctor' Neil Fox presents the first Hit40UK, the successor to the Pepsi Chart Show.
    - Mark Goodier joins Classic FM to present its weekly chart show.
  - 9 February – Wes Butters becomes the new presenter of The Official Chart. Various presenters had hosted the show since Mark Goodier's departure in November 2002.
- 2004
  - 6 June – After 11 years of hosting commercial radio’s national chart show, 'Doctor' Neil Fox is replaced as presenter of Hit40UK by Stephanie Hirst and Katy Hill.
- 2005
  - 6 March – JK and Joel take over as presenters of The Official Chart.
  - 23 October – Stephanie Hirst becomes the sole presenter of Hit40UK.
- 2006
  - February – The A List launches on Heart, Real Radio and Century FM. Featuring adult contemporary music, the programme is presented by Melanie Sykes and Nick Snaith.
  - 23 October
    - Hit40UK is relaunched with new presenter Lucio Buffone. The relaunch sees Emap resuming the broadcast of the weekly programme across their Big City Network of stations, having broadcast its own chart show for the past three years.
    - A new dance and urban chart, the Fresh 40, hosted by Dynamite MC, is introduced to commercial radio's dance and urban stations, such as those in the Galaxy Network and the Kiss Network.
- 2007
  - 14 October – Fearne Cotton and Reggie Yates take over as presenters of The Official Chart.
  - 23 December – The A List ends after less than two years. The chart, which had focused on adult contemporary music, had aired on Heart, Real Radio and Century FM.
- 2008
  - Galaxy 40 launches towards the end of the 2008 and is broadcast across the Galaxy Network.
- 2009
  - March – After less than three years on air, the final edition of Fresh 40 is broadcast. Also ending is the short-lived Galaxy 40.
  - 15 June – Commercial radio's chart show Hit40UK is relaunched as The Big Top 40 Show with Kat Shoob as the programme’s presenter.
  - 27 September – Reggie Yates becomes the sole presenter of The Official Chart.

== 2010s ==
- 2010
  - 10 March – The Official Chart Update is launched to give a midweek insight into how the Official Singles Chart is shaping up. and is broadcast as a 30 minute mid-afternoon programme on Wednesdays.
- 2011
  - No events.
- 2012
  - 26 February – The Top Ten countdown from The Official Chart is made available in vision for the first time through their website.
- 2013
  - 13 January – Jameela Jamil becomes the new presenter of The Official Chart.
- 2014
  - No events.
- 2015
  - 25 January – Clara Amfo takes over as presenter of The Official Chart.
  - 5 July – The final Sunday broadcast of BBC Radio 1's The Official Chart.
  - 10 July – The first Friday broadcast of The Official Chart. It is broadcast on Fridays as part of the drivetime show, hosted by Greg James. Its airtime is almost halved to just 1 hour and 45 minutes with only the Top 10 being played in full.
- 2016
  - No events.
- 2017
  - No events.
- 2018
  - 10 June – Following the relaunch of Key 103 as Hits Radio Manchester, the station drops out of the Big Top 40 to instead carry a locally-produced programme also taken by Hits Radio UK on digital platforms and Freeview, hosted by Sarah-Jane Crawford. Other local stations in the Hits Radio network continue to carry the Big Top 40 for the remainder of the year.
  - 15 June – Scott Mills replaces Greg James as host of The Official Chart.
  - 30 December – Following a decision by Bauer Radio to stop broadcasting The Big Top 40 Show on their Hits Radio Network after the expiration of its contract at the end of 2018, Global, which produces the show, made the decision to withdraw the programme from syndication to the wider commercial radio network. The final show is broadcast on this day.
- 2019
  - 6 January – The first edition of The Official Big Top 40 is aired. The programme is broadcast every Sunday from 4-7pm on Global's Capital and Heart networks and is presented by Will Manning. The withdrawal of the Big Top 40 from their stations leads Bauer Radio to roll out the UK Chart Show across the Hits Radio network, built on the Sunday afternoon show introduced on Hits Radio Manchester in 2018, whilst Wireless Group begins its own weekly show across its FM network, the Total Access Top 40, hosted by Olivia Jones.
  - 14 July – The Official Chart: First Look launches on BBC Radio 1. Broadcast during the historic Sunday chart show slot, the show counts down the Top 20 biggest tracks from data collected on Friday and Saturday and airs between 6 and 7pm. It is presented by Katie Thistleton and Cel Spellman.
  - 21 December – The Classic FM Chart is broadcast for the final time. They had broadcast a weekly chart show since the station's launch.

== 2020s ==
- 2020
  - 21 June – Wireless' Total Access Top 40 ends and is replaced by Bauer's UK Chart Show on Pulse 1, Signal 1 and 96.4 The Wave, following Bauer's earlier acquisition of Wireless' local FM stations. The other stations formerly owned by Wireless drop the Total Access Top 40 as part of their transition to Greatest Hits Radio.
  - 6 September – Vick Hope replaces Cel Spellman as co-host of The Official Chart: First Look.
- 2021
  - February – Pirate FM and Lincs FM, having been purchased by Bauer in 2019, begin taking the UK Chart Show, replacing locally-originated programmes in the Sunday afternoon slot. The stations continue to run largely independently of the Hits Radio network at other times.
- 2022
  - 9 September – Jack Saunders replaces Scott Mills as presenter of The Official Chart.
- 2023
  - 26 November – Craig Kingham, a producer on The Big Top 40 and its predecessors, produces his final edition of the programme, after almost 24 years and 1,200 number one singles.
- 2024
  - Lauren Layfield and Shanequa Paris become presenters of The Official Chart: First Look, replacing Vick Hope and Katie Thistleton.
