= JK and Joel =

Radio show presenting duo

- Born: Jason Griffiths; 6 January 1975 (age 51); Tenbury Wells, Worcestershire, England; Joel Hogg; 31 May 1977 (age 49); Scarborough, North Yorkshire, England
- Occupations: Radio DJs, television presenters
- Years active: 1996–2012
- Television: Hider in the House (2007–2008); Escape from Scorpion Island (2008)
- Website: Official site

Jason King (né Griffiths) and Joel Ross (né Hogg), known professionally as JK and Joel, were a British radio presenting duo, best known for hosting the official UK chart on BBC Radio 1 between 2005 and 2007 and presented the CBBC shows Hider in the House and Remote Control Star. In August 2012, JK & Joel confirmed they had split.

== Radio career ==
=== Viking FM ===
The two first worked together at Viking FM in Kingston upon Hull from 1996 when Ross joined the station from Yorkshire Coast Radio to present the overnight programme. King was hosting the afternoon show at the time. In 1998 King took over the breakfast show and Ross, who was on the afternoon programme, later began reading the travel bulletins on the show, as a punishment for turning up late. Despite not getting along at first (King headbutted Ross, breaking his nose), eventually the two were paired up as co-hosts and together they won two Gold Sony Radio Academy Awards for 'Breakfast Show Of The Year' and a Silver for 'Entertainment Show'.

=== Key 103 ===
They left Viking FM to join Key 103 in Manchester in 2000, taking over from Mike Toolan as hosts of the breakfast show where they won a further 3 Sony radio awards, Gold for UK best breakfast show, Silver for UK's best presenters and Bronze for the competition award. Joel was sacked from Key 103 after turning up three hours late for work, agreeing to join BBC Radio 1 towards the end of 2003. JK saw out the remainder of his contract with Key 103, presenting the breakfast show alone before joining Radio 1 in 2004. However, Joel came back to present their final breakfast show together.

=== BBC Radio 1 ===
They went on to join BBC Radio 1 in Spring of 2004. They initially hosted a weekend afternoon programme before moving to the Radio 1 Chart show in March 2005. They also presented the early breakfast show every Monday – Thursday from 4 am to 7 am replacing Nemone Metaxas who left to join BBC Radio 6 Music. They did not host the early breakfast show on a Friday, to compensate for their Sunday chart show and TV commitments, being replaced by Fearne Cotton and Reggie Yates of Top of the Pops fame. They were let go from Radio One in late 2007, during a large presenter shake-up at the station.

=== Virgin / Absolute Radio ===
They joined the national radio station in January 2008 Virgin Radio to present their 10 am – 1 pm slot at weekends, but left the station in the October of the same year following the radio stations take over and subsequent rebranding as Absolute Radio.

=== Radio Aire and return to Key 103 ===
JK and Joel made a return to radio in early 2009, covering shows on Manchester's Key 103 and Leeds' Radio Aire. In July 2009, it was announced that the duo would permanently take over the breakfast show from Simon Logan on Radio Aire. The pair signed a contract for two years. They made their debut on 20 July 2009 and left the station on 20 July 2011.

=== Bauer Radio ===
They also presented JK and Joel's Saturday Night Thing on some Bauer Place stations until July 2011.

=== Global Radio ===
In August 2011, JK and Joel signed to the Global Group, working on separate stations including Heart and Capital.

== Television career ==
=== As presenters ===
In February 2007 the two men became presenters of the award-winning CBBC show Hider in the House, where a celebrity has to be hidden in a house, without one parent finding out. The show ran for 4 series and was the channel's most watched show.

Also in February 2007, JK and Joel appeared on Virgin Media TV channel 999, 'Virgin iD', introducing the new features of the cable service.

On 7 July 2007, JK and Joel launched on ITV with their new show music quiz show Sing It Back: Lyric Champion.

Between 2008 and 2009, the pair presented series 2 and 3 of Escape from Scorpion Island on ABC in Australia and the BBC in the United Kingdom.

They hosted the first series of My Camp Rock on the Disney Channel in the UK and Ireland in 2009.

Their TV show Remote Control Star launched on BBC in early 2011.

From November 2011, the duo started presenting for Flirt!TV on Tour – a weekly mini series following different nights out at universities around the country.

They have also hosted programmes for BBC Three and Men & Motors. JK and Joel have presented Playboyz, a fast-moving gadget series for Granada Men and Motors, and Motor Maniacs, a series dedicated to men obsessed with bikes and cars.

They have been the hosts of Pure Soap on BBC Three, a daily 30-minute live show looking at all things to do with soap operas.

=== As contestants ===
Ross distinguished himself by winning Channel 5's 2005 Britain's Worst Celebrity Driver competition on 25 September 2005, despite the best efforts of JK, his co-driver.

In January 2006, the duo won a "celebrity pairings" edition of The Weakest Link, raising £12,900 for the Five Stars Scanner Appeal, a children's charity they had supported while working in Manchester.

In March 2006, JK took part in Channel 4's final series of The Games, coming in third place for the men.

In 2011, the double act appeared as guests on CBBC's 'Hacker Time'.

== Other work ==
In 2010, JK and Joel presented Party in the Park Leeds in front of 70,000 people and live on Radio Aire.

Media offices
Preceded by Various presenters	BBC Radio 1 chart show presenter 6 March 2005 - 30 September 2007	Succeeded by Fearne Cotton; Reggie Yates
