= James Cusack =

British broadcaster and DJ

- Born: 14 January 1990; Sheffield, South Yorkshire, England
- Occupations: Radio presenter Musician
- Employer(s): Global; Heart; BBC Radio 1
- Known for: Broadcasting
- Website: www.jamescusack.com

James Cusack is a British broadcaster and DJ. He has presented for a number of UK radio networks, including BBC Radio 1, Capital and Heart. He has been a presenter at Heart since July 2018 and BBC Radio 1 from December 2020 onwards.

In 2017, he was the warm-up act for Olly Murs as part of his UK arena tour. Cusack has played a number of DJ sets across Europe from 2017 onwards, including Sziget Festival and Untold Festival. Cusack also appeared with CamelPhat at Amnesia in Ibiza.

== Early life ==
Cusack was born in Sheffield, South Yorkshire. He appeared on the ITV children's show, Diggit, whilst at secondary school. It was part of the wider GMTV set of programmes, produced by ITV. Cusack appeared on the show with presenters Fearne Cotton and Reggie Yates.

While studying at Thomas Rotherham College, he secured his first local radio gig, presenting the overnight show on Hallam FM as a teenager.

== Broadcasting career ==
In 2011, it was announced that Cusack was to become the presenter for the weekend breakfast show on Capital in the North East. In 2015, he moved to the larger Yorkshire audience, to present the same show but for Capital Yorkshire. Cusack returned to TV work in 2016, this time to appear on-screen in a small non-recurring role in Coronation Street. Cusack also presented the Christmas lights event at Meadowhall, Sheffield for a number of years while at Capital.

After three years at Capital, Cusack moved internally within the Global group of companies, to Heart in July 2018. He was part of Heart's Sunday lineup alongside JLS member Marvin Humes and Spice Girl Emma Bunton.

In December 2020, BBC Radio 1 announced that Cusack would begin presenting for them during the festive period. In 2021, he was invited back to present as part of BBC Radio 1's Easter weekend lineup, before covering for Adele Roberts on Radio 1 Weekend Breakfast in July and August 2021. He has since appeared on the schedule numerous times, including on New Year's Eve 2021 in the 5:30pm–9:30pm evening slot and covering for Matt Edmondson and Mollie King on the weekend 1pm-4pm show in January 2022.

In 2022, Cusack has appeared more regularly on the BBC Radio 1 schedule, including appearing on the 10:30am–1pm weekend show in February 2022, broadcast from MediaCityUK in Salford, Greater Manchester, followed by regular shows in the 1pm–4pm weekend slot across April and May 2022. It is also the first time he has appeared on a weekday, covering the Friday afternoon show.

In June 2023, Cusack cover-presented the Capital Liverpool weekday drivetime show for 4 months and now regularly appears as a presenter on Capital (radio network).

During 2023, Cusack has continued to appear as one of the main deputy presenters on BBC Radio 1 now covering a range of weekday and weekend shows on the network including the Friday to Sunday 1–4pm show, weekdays 1-3:30pm as a co-host with Vicky Hawkesworth, The Official Chart on Fridays at 4pm and as a co-host with Mollie King in September and October 2023.

In January 2025, Cusack permanently joined Radio 1 to host its weekend breakfast show, broadcasting live from Salford. He replaced Sam MacGregor and Danni Diston, who took on the weekend afternoon show. From 2026, Cusack can also be heard across Radio 1 Anthems and Radio 1 Dance.

== Music ==
As a DJ, Cusack has appeared at a number of major European festivals and appeared alongside major artists, such as Olly Murs on his 24 Hrs Tour. He performed at Sziget Festival in Budapest in 2017 as part of his breakthrough year. During the same year, he also played Untold Festival in Romania. He completed 2017 with an appearance at Amnesia in Ibiza, playing on the same night as CamelPhat and Gorgon City. He also appeared in the United Kingdom as a talent judge.
