= The Network Chart Show =

- Genre: Top 40
- Running time: 3 hours (4:00 pm – 7:00 pm)
- Country of origin: United Kingdom
- Language(s): English
- Home station: Capital FM
- Hosted by: David Jensen; Neil Fox; Stephanie Hirst; Katy Hill; Lucio Buffone; Rich Clarke; Kat Shoob; Marvin Humes
- Recording studio: Global's London studios
- Original release: 30 September 1984 – 30 December 2018
- Audio format: Stereo

The Commercial Radio Chart Show was a radio programme that was broadcast across commercial adult contemporary and contemporary hit radio stations across the United Kingdom, from 30 September 1984 to 30 December 2018. It had many different names over the years, beginning with The Network Chart Show (later sponsored by Nescafé), before securing sponsorship with Pepsi between 1993 and 2003, which led to the birth of The Pepsi Chart. Since then, it has been known as Hit40UK, The Big Top 40 Show, The Vodafone Freebees Big Top 40, The Vodafone Big Top 40 and, finally, The Official Vodafone Big Top 40 between October 2017 and December 2018.

The show was cancelled at the end of 2018, after its producers – Global Radio – withdrew it from syndication following Bauer Radio's decision to stop broadcasting the programme. The final syndicated commercial radio chart show was broadcast on 30 December 2018 by Marvin Humes and Kat Shoob. It was replaced on Global-owned stations by The Official Big Top 40.

== Background ==
Originally, the main presenter was David Jensen (known then as "Kid Jensen") with holiday cover provided by Timmy Mallett and Alan Freeman, and in later years, Pat Sharp. Jensen would record trailers to run on local stations during the week which famously started with the words "Hi Chart Fans!!".

The programme featured the Network Top 30 and ran from 5-7pm, competing directly with BBC Radio One's Top 40 chart show. It was produced by Capital Radio from their studios on Euston Road in London.

The Network Chart Show aired on Independent Local Radio (ILR) stations using the transmission circuits of Independent Radio News, which meant it was originally broadcast in mono in most areas (some stations near to the London area were able to receive Capital on FM well enough for 'off air' rebroadcast). Later, some circuits were upgraded to enable stereo transmission, followed by a satellite distribution service later on.

The programme went on air at exactly 5:00 pm, displacing IRN's hourly national news bulletins at 5 pm and 6 pm, originating from LBC. Each station carrying the programme would play their own 10-second ident before linking up with the network feed. The final song faded out shortly before the 7pm networked news, allowing each station to opt-out for an ident before either presenting their own news or re-joining the network for the IRN bulletin.

On Sunday 21 October 1990, the programme was extended to start following the 4 pm IRN bulletin, with the chart expanded to a Top 40 – although not all of the stations took the extra hour to begin with. From 1985, the programme was sponsored by Nescafe.

== The Network Chart ==
The chart was owned by Association of Independent Radio Contractors (AIRC)–the trade body for ILR stations. The chart was distributed by Satellite Media Services, produced by Capital Radio and compiled by the Media Research Information Bureau (MRIB). The chart differed from the entirely sales-based "official" Gallup chart (now the OCC) used by the BBC as it included airplay statistics when compiling the chart. In 1987, sales data for a Thursday-to-Wednesday week was logged manually in diaries by 300 record shops and posted to MRIB. In 1991, data was being collected from around 300 independent record shops who were provided with a checklist of currently released singles. Sales were "checked off against ticks on the retailers' masterbags" and these figures would be collected by telephone on Thursdays. Airplay statistics were factored in by all Independent Local Radio stations providing which playlist (A, B, or C) the current releases were on. More weight was given to the larger stations at the time, such as Capital (17 per cent), BRMB, Clyde, GWR, Metro, and Piccadilly. If a record was on every Independent Local Radio station's A list the sales were boosted by 40 per cent.

MRIB's Network Chart was a rival competitor to the self-proclaimed "official" UK chart that was compiled by Gallup and that is now published by the Official Charts Company (OCC). It was reported in March, 1991 that the Network Chart compiled by MRIB had a radio audience size that was gaining on the BBC Radio 1 chart show which broadcast the chart that was compiled by Gallup for the OCC (then CIN). Later that month Music & Media magazine reported that they were switching to publishing the MRIB charts for the UK which they would also use to compile the European Hot 100 Singles and European Top 100 Albums charts. There were sometimes public disputes over accuracy between Gallup and MRIB such as when the former placed Whitney Houston's single "I Wanna Dance with Somebody (Who Loves Me)" at number 10 while the latter placed it at number 2 in the same week. MRIB's Network Chart used sales data starting from different days of the week from those Gallup used for its Radio 1 chart; thus the Network Chart's sales week straddled two Gallup chart sales weeks. However, in July 1993, when Pepsi took over sponsorship, it was announced that the Top 10 of the Network Chart would use the same sales data as Gallup's chart for CIN, but that the lower 11-40 positions would still combine sales with radio airplay data. This new Network Chart was compiled by Spotlight Publications who beat MRIB to the contract.

For its first three years, the Network Chart was more up-to-date than the BBC chart broadcast simultaneously (which had been around since the previous Tuesday), with many singles entering, and reaching their peak on, Sunday's new Network Chart before they did so on the official chart announced two days later. From 4 October 1987 the official (Gallup/OCC) chart which was broadcast by the BBC was brand new on a Sunday afternoon and was more up-to-date, using a Monday-to-Saturday sales week compared to the Network Chart's Thursday-to-Wednesday one. Even when the Network Chart was more up-to-date, though, the Gallup chart was always considered the industry-recognised "official" Top 40, and was promoted as such by the BBC.

In compiling the chart MRIB employed a sliding scale, meaning that for the lower reaches of the Top 40, airplay counted almost as much as sales. This often meant that the 40-to-20 positions could be very different between the Network and BBC charts. The weight given to airplay diminished the higher one went in the chart, and the Top 10 was meant to be entirely sales-based, although the Network Chart did not register sales from Saturday, the single most important record-buying day, until a week later. It was not unusual for the MRIB and Gallup charts to have different songs at number one.

Because the chart did not include sales from the likes of Woolworths and WHSmith, some songs with more specialised appeal (including many by The Smiths) peaked higher than on the official chart, whereas some songs with more middle-of-the-road appeal (such as Su Pollard's "Starting Together") might sometimes peak lower. This had also been the case with the Record Business magazine chart used by ILR in the late 1970s and early 1980s, which also did not include data from the more family-friendly shops. As with the Record Business chart, regional charts were also produced by MRIB for individual ILR stations.

== Spin-offs ==
MRIB's Network Chart was published in music publications NME, Melody Maker, and Sounds, as well as on ITV's ORACLE teletext service.

A TV version launched in 1987 called The Roxy, presented by David Jensen and Kevin Sharkey using the chart data from The Network Chart. The show itself tried and failed to compete with the BBC, who had the long-established Top of the Pops. Announcements in the press indicated that the Saturday repeat of The Roxy would unveil the new Network Chart, but this failed to materialise; the Saturday repeat was always identical to the initial Tuesday broadcast, and so carried only the chart that had been around since the previous Sunday. It ran for just under a year and was produced by Tyne Tees Television, but was often beaten in the ratings by rival programmes on other channels such as EastEnders. The TV show was axed after industrial disputes saw the end of live performances.

On 16 March 1989, Fantail Publishing released a tie-in book called The Network Chart Book Of Hits, which was a review of the previous year (1988) in music. It featured a selection of the singles, albums and music videos charts, as well as interviews with some of the artists who had big hits that year. The book was introduced by David Jensen and the author was Mike Hrano.

Teen magazine Number One used The Network Chart singles and albums charts from January 1985 until summer 1990, when it was sold by its publishers, IPC Media to BBC Magazines. From then on it featured the official national singles and albums charts until the magazine's demise in early 1992. In addition, the national Sunday newspaper The News of the World used to feature The Network Chart Top 20 singles chart in their music section in the late 1980s and early 1990s, whereas The Sunday People featured the MRIB top 10 right up to MRIB's Singles/Album Chart demise in April 2008. However, Independent Radio stopped using it in August 1993.

== Re-branding ==
From 1 August 1993, Neil Fox took over the rebranded Pepsi Network Chart, which later became the Pepsi Chart, and then Hit40UK. On 15 June 2009, Hit40UK became The Big Top 40 Show. All these shows mostly used the same Top 10 as The Official Chart chart which is compiled by the Official Charts Company, except The Big Top 40 which used the iTunes live top 10, at the end of the show, and kicks off with the full week's top 10 on iTunes. The 40–11 positions on all of them is a 50/50 sales/airplay chart. In January, 2019, all re-branded versions of The Network Chart were finally replaced with The Official Big Top 40 which has more listeners than The Official Chart which is broadcast on BBC Radio 1 and which is compiled by the Official Charts Company.

== See also ==
- Timeline of chart shows on UK radio
