= Kate Arnell =

British television presenter (born 1983)

- Born: Kate Edmondson; 1983 (age 42–43); Portsmouth, England
- Occupation: Television presenter
- Children: 1
- Relatives: Matt Edmondson (brother)

Kate Arnell (née Edmondson, born 1983) is a British television presenter, best known for her work with MTV and CBBC.

== Early life ==
She was born Kate Edmondson in Portsmouth, England, in 1983.

== Career ==
In 2006, Arnell was selected after a nationwide search to present The Loaded Hour, sponsored by Loaded magazine, on Freeview channel TMF and has since gone on to present TMF Live and TMF Kicks, Totally Boyband Live on sister channel MTV, and Q the Music on Q/The Hits!

Arnell was a radio presenter on Pure FM, the student radio station at the University of Portsmouth, where she read media studies. Both her parents worked at the university at the time.

Arnell appeared in the popular CBBC show Hider in the House alongside Jason King and Joel Ross in 2008, and presented the Teen 24 slot for the BBC News channel.

From 26 October to 7 November 2008, she was also the host for the official webisodes of the Sony Ericsson FanWalk. Eighteen webisodes were released following the fanwalkers for a course of nine days. She also made a cameo appearance on The Legend of Dick and Dom in the episode where the crew have to find the mists of time alongside Chloe Bale, Richard McCourt, Dominic Wood and Steve Furst.

Arnell has occasionally presented the BBC's coverage of the National Lottery Draws, mainly the midweek and Friday EuroMillions draws and in 2013, she co-presented the CBBC show Who Let the Dogs Out and About.

Previously, Arnell hosted the YouTube channel "Anglophenia". She then went on to create her own YouTube channel "Eco-Boost" in 2015, teaching her viewers about zero-waste living, organic fashion and eco-friendly alternatives. She also wrote a book, "Six Weeks to Zero Waste" in 2020 surrounding these topics.

== Personal life ==
Arnell is married. Her brother, Matt Edmondson, is known for his work with BBC Radio 1 and ITV2.
