= Prized Apart =

British television game show

- Genre: Game show
- Presented by: Emma Willis; Reggie Yates
- Country of origin: United Kingdom
- No. of series: 1
- No. of episodes: 6

Production
- Executive producers: Karl Warner; Meredith Chambers
- Production locations: Farnborough (studio); Morocco (challenges)
- Running time: 65 minutes
- Production company: Electric Ray

Original release
- Network: BBC One
- Release: 13 June – 25 July 2015

Prized Apart is an adventure game show presented by Emma Willis and Reggie Yates that began airing on 13 June 2015 on BBC One. Ten men and women compete for the chance to win £100,000; supervised by Yates and, where necessary, a safety team, contestants participate in assorted adventure tasks located in Morocco. Meanwhile, their family members, accompanied by Willis, watch the events in a studio. The show received negative reviews and on 4 August 2015, it was announced that it had been axed after just one series.

== Background ==
Prized Apart was commissioned by the BBC in 2014 and produced by Electric Ray, a firm operated by previous BBC entertainment commissioner Karl Warner. The show's development took place in the UK. The development of Prized Apart took place while Warner held the position of head of light entertainment at the BBC, and negative publicity arose from the fact that it appeared that Warner had taken it with him. BBC protocols were altered as a result.

In an interview, host Emma Willis explained that the format intrigued her: following her participation in 2008's Jack Osbourne: Adrenaline Junkie, she had desired to participate in additional adventure-related shows and Prized Apart seemed to be one such show.

== Gameplay ==
The game starts with the contestants split into two teams. Supervised by co-host Reggie Yates, the teams receive a task, and whichever team completes the task quickest is deemed "safe". Members of the team that lose this initial task face the "Survival Challenge". The three poorest-performing contestants are then flown home to a studio with Emma Willis. This flight home has been criticised due to the increased carbon footprint and cost involved with sending contestants home each week.

Each contestant in the studio is then given a chance to stay in the game through completion of an additional task, in which their loved ones answer questions of general knowledge to keep their loved ones in the game. Contestants must light five steps towards the "gate"; lighting is accomplished by correctly answering a series of questions. Whoever is placed second or third in the Survival Challenge gets a two-light head start, and whoever places third or fourth in the Survival Challenge gets a one-light head start. Four categories are offered. The second or third placed contestant picks the first category, and his or her family member answers, then the third or fourth placed contestant picks from any of the three remaining categories from which his or her family member answers. Finally, the fourth or fifth placed contestant picks from the leftover categories.

After five steps, the contestant gets to walk forward to the "gate", in which their loved one must answer one final question before returning to the game. Wrong answers result in each of the other contestants' lights being activated, with the exception of those contestants who are one light away from survival and thus re-entering the game. Once two contestants have reached the gate and re-enter the game, travelling back to Morocco, the final pair is sent home. This process repeats itself for five weeks, with a double elimination in week three, and week six being the final episode and grand finale, during which the winner of the £100,000 prize will be revealed.

Double eliminations are dealt with as follows. The head-start mechanism works the same as before, but it is the first two pairs to three who go through. Once two pairs are through, the race to the gate resumes in the normal manner.

Finals are played as head-to-heads; two contestants are picked out of a hat to go head-to-head, with the other two also going head-to-head. The winner of each heat goes straight home, with the losers going head-to-head in a race; the producers have taken over an airport, and the losers must race from the start of the airport to the plane, involving a labyrinth of barriers and customs (a test of memory of the journey reminiscent of the final round of Trapped!; they must answer at least ten questions correctly out of twenty). The two contestants must then provide their boarding passes in the correct order; whichever contestant arrived at check-in first makes the first attempt. Whichever contestant boards first becomes the third finalist. The studio segments remain the same, except the first to the "gate" gets the first chance to win £100,000. Each head-to-head winner gains at least one light lit; they then have a shoot-out to see who gains another.

== Couples ==
Couple	Status
Elizabeth & Sandra	Eliminated 1st on 13 June 2015
Joelle & Marino	Eliminated 2nd on 20 June 2015
Kate & Andrew	Eliminated 3rd on 27 June 2015
Leon & Andrea	Eliminated 4th on 27 June 2015
Aaron & Sat	Eliminated 5th on 11 July 2015
Steffan & Nicky	Eliminated 6th on 18 July 2015
Katie & Alan	Eliminated 7th on 25 July 2015
Jonny & Andie	Third place on 25 July 2015
Craig & Chris	Runners-up on 25 July 2015
Kennedy & Julia	Winners on 25 July 2015

=== Elimination chart ===
Elimination chart
Couple	1	2	3	4	5	6
Kennedy & Julia	Safe	Safe	Safe	Safe	Safe	Winners
Craig & Chris	Safe	Safe	Safe	Safe	Safe	Runners-up
Jonny & Andie	Safe	Safe	Safe	Safe	Safe	3rd
Katie & Alan	Safe	Safe	Safe	Safe	Safe	Eliminated
Steffan & Nicky	Safe	Safe	Safe	Safe	Eliminated	
Aaron & Sat	Safe	Safe	Safe	Eliminated		
Leon & Andrea	Safe	Safe	Eliminated			
Kate & Andrew	Safe	Safe	Eliminated			
Joelle & Marino	Safe	Eliminated				
Elizabeth & Sandra	Eliminated					

The contestant was on the losing team for that week, but won the survival challenge.
The contestant was on the losing team and lost the survival challenge, but were saved by their partner.
The couple were eliminated.
The couple finished in third place.
The couple finished as the runners-up.
The couple won the competition

== Reception ==
Prized Apart received mostly negative reception from critics, with Mirror.co.uk describing it as a "flop" and an "overcomplicated mess", drawing attention to the environmental issue of flying contestants to and from Morocco every week on a private jet. The Metro had similar concerns, highlighting the global footprint involved in the contestants' travel, and called the show a "waste of taxpayers money".
