= Yorkshire Coast Radio =

- Scarborough, North Yorkshire; England
- Broadcast area: Scarborough, Whitby & Bridlington
- Frequency: FM: 96.2, 102.4, 103.1 MHz

Programming
- Format: Contemporary

Ownership
- Owner: Bauer

History
- First air date: 7 November 1993
- Last air date: 31 August 2020

Yorkshire Coast Radio was an Independent Local Radio station serving Scarborough, Whitby & Bridlington. The station was folded into Greatest Hits Radio Yorkshire, as part of a rebrand, on 1 September 2020.

== History ==
For many years, several businessmen in Scarborough had campaigned for their own local radio station. A licence was advertised in 1991 and contested by three groups. The winning consortium, Yorkshire Coast Radio Limited, was founded by radio executive and former presenter Paul Rusling with backing from former Conservative MP Wilf Proudfoot, who served as managing director for short-lived pirate station Radio 270, which was based in the town. After the franchise was awarded, YCR was bought out by Minster Sound plc – the owners of neighbouring York-based station Minster FM, which began broadcasting in July 1992.

Yorkshire Coast Radio was launched on Sunday 7 November 1993, broadcasting local programming from 6 am-10 pm each day with overnight output simulcast from Minster FM. Originally, the station had planned to broadcast from the Heatherleigh, a trawler moored in Scarborough's harbour which later became a museum. When the station was brought, YCR opted for conventional studios at Falsgrave Road near the town centre, before later moving to purpose-built facilities in Eastfield, on the outskirts of town.

On 7 November 1999, Yorkshire Coast Radio expanded after its owners were awarded the licence to cover the neighbouring Bridlington area. The station operated as a part-time opt-out of Yorkshire Coast Radio and was called Yorkshire Coast Radio Bridlington.

Yorkshire Coast Radio broadcast to Scarborough and Filey on 96.2 FM, Bridlington on 102.4 FM and Whitby on 103.1 FM.

On 17 February 2015, Yorkshire Coast Radio launched a DAB simulcast on the MuxCo North Yorkshire multiplex.

For a number of years the station also operated an online service called 'Yorkshire Coast Radio Extra' which broadcast news and interviews as well as football commentaries on Scarborough Athletic, Bridlington Town and Whitby Town games.

In 2018, the station launched an additional service, Yorkshire Coast Radio 70s.

UKRD's local radio stations, including Yorkshire Coast Radio, were bought by Bauer Radio in 2019, and in May 2020, Bauer announced it would merge the AM and FM stations in Yorkshire to form the Greatest Hits Radio Yorkshire sub-network as part of a wider restructuring of its local radio stations.

On 1 September 2020, it became a part of Bauer Radio's Greatest Hits Radio network with music from the 1970s, 1980s, and 1990s – this type of music having been phased in since its takeover. and Tom Hooper had presented the final programme from Scarborough for Yorkshire Coast Radio two days earlier.

Former notable presenters on the station include Joel Ross (later one half of JK and Joel).

The last of the former Yorkshire Coast Radio presenters Paddy Billington, Kev Roberts, Tom Hooper, Mike Nicholson, Tom Ironside and Matthew Pells are currently on the radio station This is The Coast which is online and on DAB.

== Programming ==
Regional programming is produced and broadcast from Bauer's Leeds studios from 1-4pm on weekdays, presented by Steve Priestley.

In the official RAJAR audience data for Q2 2018, Yorkshire Coast Radio achieved a 53% weekly reach which was higher than for any other radio station in the UK.

=== News ===
Yorkshire Coast Radio broadcast hourly local news bulletins from 6 am–10 pm on weekdays and 8 am–12 pm at weekends, with headlines on the half-hour during weekday breakfast.

Its journalists were based at the radio station's Scarborough studios and also produced content for the station's website and smartphone app.

National bulletins from Sky News Radio were carried every hour at all other times.
