= Mighty Truck of Stuff =

British children's television series

- Genre: Game show
- Created by: Joe Mace; Juliet Denison
- Presented by: Reggie Yates
- Country of origin: United Kingdom
- Original language: English
- No. of series: 2
- No. of episodes: 26

Production
- Running time: 60 minutes (Series 1); 165 minutes (Series 2)
- Production company: Initial

Original release
- Network: CBBC Channel
- Release: 15 October 2005 – 8 July 2006

Mighty Truck of Stuff (MTOS) is a British children's television programme, where a truck was filled with toys and one phone-in viewer won its contents. Following the show, the truck was driven to the home of the winner. It was shown on Saturday mornings from 15 October 2005 to 8 July 2006 on the CBBC Channel. It was presented by Reggie Yates. The format was devised by Joe Mace and Juliet Denison.

Although it was targeted at children between the ages of 8 and 12 (the phone-in age), the frequent references to TV production issues, mixture of characters and bizarre humour won it a small cult following amongst adults.

== Characters ==
All the packers have 'packer' added onto their names; this usually applies also to guests.

- Reggie Yates: is the main presenter of the programme.
- Kojo: is the hyperactive partner-in-crime to Reggie, and as such is the assistant presenter. In the "World Cup Episode", Kojo looked like Huggy-bear in the band.
- Pablo 'Packer': (real name Phil Gallagher) in charge of the packers. Pablo, in the "World Cup Episode" looked like Pat Sharp (Mullet era) for the Packer Band. He is known for making clichéd commentary during the games (e.g. 'How egg-citing!' during head-egg-smashing contests).
- Double H 'Packer': (real name Hamden Huggett, hence the nickname) is very similar to Nick Packer as he does not speak. In the "World Cup Episode", Double H Packer was decked out in disco gear, along with multi-coloured mullet. In the game 'Hunge' Double H would mop celebrity guest's mouths with a sponge. Whenever he appears on screen, he tends to smile comically.
- Fancy 'Packer': regularly demonstrates toys in use (e.g. go-karts). His nickname is never explained, although presenter Reggie always says 'Fancy' in an amusing way ('fanceehhh!') when referring to him.
- Lonely 'Packer': appeared in the last two episodes, looking sullenly at the toys on display. He didn't say anything on screen throughout the programmes.
- Nick 'Packer': is a silent, almost mime-like, member of the team. In the episode in which two of the judges from Strictly Dance Fever appeared, Nick graced us with a Chicago-type dance along to "All That Jazz". Nick is almost famed for his tight fitting outfits over his "chubby frame", which presenter Reggie mocks every week. Nick has a tendency to eat Donuts and Muffins and other confectioneries. Whenever Nick is in a mood, he usually balls up his fists, sneers or mouths unintelligibly before walking away in a mood. He is usually the one that gets told off the most by Reggie. Nick does the phone dance and DOES NOT like it when other people try and do it. He either does it in the studio or out in the street.
- Superfans: Reggie's Superfans. Reese ("The Biggest Fan") and Jared ("A Fan") who are both from New Zealand. Each week the Superfans have their own slot in which they offer people in a shopping centre "services" (e.g. Indoor Sky Diving on Jared's back, Swimming on dry land or Meet a celebrity (or Jared dressed up as the wrong celebrity)) in exchange for things to put on the truck. They both wear shirts with a picture of Reggie on and the slogan "I Love Reggie" except Jared's shirt, amended to say "I Also Love Reggie". Typically the Superfans end up with worthless gifts for the truck, such as plasters and crisp packets.

== The Truck ==
The Mighty Truck of Stuff is located in a depot in West London. It is turquoise in colour. The sides display the Mighty Truck of Stuff logo. The Truck is also used for a stage when they play "Show Me the ropes" – a game where two people have to simulate an event (e.g. dating) with their arms controlled by the packers via ropes.

== Catchphrases ==
- "It's a limerick, limerick, limerick, limerick..." (and so on). In the postbag/emails part of the show, Reggie and the packers always sing this little chant when they have a limerick sent in.
- "He never shuts up. He's always giving it that." In the Football episode, Reggie complains about Nick talking all the time (which he doesn't because he's a mime).
- "No! No! Nooooooo! Why??" When Reggie fails to win a prize for the truck, he uses this catchphrase, as well as dropping to the ground on his knees. In later episodes, Reggie called on the help of Pablo to 'change gear' (thereby altering the tone of his 'noooo' cries).
- "Its-a very nice!" Frequently used by Reggie when describing gifts to go on the truck, and occasionally followed by an imitation of Bruce Forsyth.
- "Leave it!" Whenever something undesired happens on the show, or a packer is the subject of a joke, some of the team become irate and Reggie has to settle them down by shouting "Leave it!". In particular, Nick Packer regularly displayed angry (and almost aggressive) tendencies which Reggie had to deal with.
- "Come follow me, come follow me, come follow me." Reggie often says this phrase when he wants the camera to follow him, usually when he goes to pick someone to phone for the Mighty Truck of Stuff.
- "SHOW ME THE TRUCK!" The viewer must shout this over the phone when they get a call from Reggie. Usually, they have either Kojo or Nick in the background mouthing the phrase. In the "World Cup Episode", instead of "Show me the truck", viewers had to shout "SHOW ME THE WORLD CUP!" Occasionally, the programme would screen video clips sent in by viewers, which showed a youngster answering someone else's phone in an inappropriate place (e.g. estate agent) and shouting the catchphrase.
- "He's got to do what?! Wearing what?! Whilst in a what?!" Before The Batman cartoon, Reggie gets a phone call from the Commissioner telling the Old Man, Fat Man Bat Fan to do some sort of wacky task (horn blasts not unlike the sound effects that accompanied the "Biff!" "Pow!" etc. effects in the 1960s Batman television series act as punctuation to each question).
- "He loves the cake/I love cake!" Until recently, Kojo said this when he was presented with cake. However, in the "World Cup Episode", he was getting bored with cake and had started to love cookies.
- "Get into your positions." Before the first/second part of Pinky and the Brain, Reggie gives this instruction and everyone gets in a weird position in order to watch "Pinky and the Brain".

== The end of the show ==
When the viewer wins the Mighty Truck of Stuff, the audience, Packers, guest packers, Reggie and Kojo all cheer and the music/song "All comes back to you". Reggie, usually accompanied by Nick, drive out of the studio/depot to the winning viewer.

The last in the series was broadcast on 8 July 2006. Following that, on 15 July were 2 special Sport Relief shows called Get Sub'd! and Reggie Goes the Extra Mile. Then a week later (22 July), a new Saturday morning show called The POD began to broadcast on both the CBBC Channel and BBC Two.

== Allusions ==
Mighty Truck of Stuff cast, particularly Reggie, frequently make references to entertain older viewers. In one episode, Reggie encountered a man with bad breath, and said: "Get that man a Tic-Tac! [pause] But of course, here on the BBC, Tic-Tacs are as good as any other breath mint" (respecting the BBC's no-product-placement stance). In another episode, where judges for a dancing contest were holding up paddles with scores, Reggie exclaimed: "Paddle me! [pause] Er yes, mums, I did just say paddle me." An actress playing Pablo's mother (Nuria Benet) appeared in one episode, making highly suggestive moves towards Reggie. The Old Man, Fat Man, Bat Fan section was also a source of in-gags and humour generally beyond the scope of the young target audience (8- to 12-year-olds).

== Old Man, Fat Man, Bat Fan ==
Every week, before showing The Batman cartoon, Reggie would receive a phone call from a 'Commissioner' character, who would set an 'evil' challenge to win toys for the show. In typical MTOS fashion, Reggie would be amazed at the demands of the Commissioner, before moving on to chat about cookery or pubs. Always rhyming or alliterating, these challenges created comical scenarios, such as the task to "Glue 42 blue shoes to the boxing kangaroo's blue canoe, before the tattooed dude eats his stew". In that episode, an unidentified man dressed in an obese Batman suit faced the task of glueing shoes to a plastic boat while a man dressed in a boxing kangaroo outfit played around on top. The cartoon was introduced, and when it had finished, the number of blue shoes was compared against the amount of stew that another unidentified tattooed man had consumed. For these games, the audience of children was oblivious to the bizarre humour, but it provided entertainment for older viewers. In the second series it was decided to use a regular Old Man, Fat Man, Bat Fan who was played by Nigel Rouine every week, he had such tasks as "Eating the pasta fasta than the rasta" and to "Sticker the vicar quicker than the penalty kicker". In the final episode the character was played by Jade Goody.

== Transmissions ==
Series	Start date	End date	Episodes
1	15 October 2005	17 December 2005	10
Special	25 March 2006		1
2	1 April 2006	8 July 2006	15
