= Release the Hounds =

British game show

- Also known as: Release the Hounds: Famous and Freaked (2017–18)
- Genre: Game show, reality television
- Presented by: Reggie Yates (2013–2017); Matt Edmondson (2017–2018)
- Country of origin: United Kingdom
- Original language: English
- No. of series: 4
- No. of episodes: 24 (inc. pilot + 4 specials)

Production
- Running time: 60 minutes (inc. adverts)
- Production companies: Gogglebox Entertainment (2013–2015); Primal Media (2017–18)

Original release
- Network: ITV2
- Release: 28 October 2013 – 8 February 2018

Release the Hounds is a British television game show that was broadcast on ITV2 from October 2013 to February 2018. The show, hosted first by Reggie Yates and later by Matt Edmondson, culminates in the participants attempting to complete scary gruesome challenges in order to find keys to unlock chests containing money and then being chased by dogs in the hope of escaping and winning the cash prize.

== Background ==
Release the Hounds was first broadcast on ITV2 as a one-off Halloween episode on 28 October 2013 and repeated on 31 October. Having attracted 650,000+ viewers, a further six programmes were commissioned in January 2014, to be made by Gogglebox Entertainment and latterly Primal Media both run by Mat Steiner and Adam Wood.

=== Filming locations ===
The show purported to take place in a haunted country estate in the English hills but was actually filmed at Bramley Ordnance Depot in north Hampshire.

For the 2015 series, the filming was transferred to a new filming site in a square mile of Lithuanian forest, created by Gogglebox Entertainment after similar programmes were commissioned for Sweden, Denmark, Russia, the Netherlands and Lithuania itself. A similar film set was planned for South America to film series for Peru and the United States. The German version was also filmed in the original set near London and premiered on 1 March 2014 on ProSieben.

== Format ==
The show begins with the disclaimer "The producers would like to thank the families of the participants. No dogs were harmed in the documentation of this event". Each contest occurs at night, as three contestants take part in gory and unpleasant challenges to find (or release) a key.

After each round, one of the contestants has to run a floodlit course pursued by snarling dogs. They are given a head start which reduces in length the longer the contestants take to pass each task.

The contestant carries a red backpack containing several thousand pounds. Before they run, they’re given a choice to add extra cash to their run in exchange of shortening their head start (eg: £3,000 for 3 meters) and, in some episodes, the contestant can try and grab two £1,000 bundles hanging from the trees during their run if they are tempted.

After the decision is made, the dogs are brought out and a speaker sounds saying “RELEASE THE HOUNDS”, the gate is opened and the dogs start to give chase. If the contestant successfully outruns the dogs and reaches the ladder on the wall at end of the course before the dogs catch them, they keep all the money that they won and "survive". However, if they fail to escape and get taken down and caught by the dogs, they are "killed and ripped to shreds", along with the money.

Reggie Yates presented the show from 2013 until 2017. He was replaced by BBC Radio 1 DJ Matt Edmondson from series 4.

== Transmissions ==
=== Series ===
Series	Start date	End date	Episodes	Presenter
Pilot	28 October 2013		1	Reggie Yates
1	22 September 2014	27 October 2014	6	Reggie Yates
2	30 September 2015	11 November 2015	5	Reggie Yates
3	9 February 2017	23 March 2017	7	Reggie Yates
4	11 January 2018	8 February 2018	5	Matt Edmondson

=== Specials ===
Date	Entitle	Presenter
18 December 2014	Christmas Special	Reggie Yates
28 October 2015	Halloween Special	Reggie Yates
9 December 2015	Christmas Special	Reggie Yates
31 October 2017	Halloween Special	Matt Edmondson

== Critical reception ==
The Guardian described the pilot show as "both great and stupid, which ticks the only television boxes you need to worry about." The South Wales Argus was more scathing, saying the contestants appear "to have been brought down by none other than Lassie" and "the pursuit carries all the fear factor of an Ashleigh and Pudsey routine." The show has both been nominated multiple times at the Broadcast Awards as well as winning awards including Realscreen, and most recently Best Entertainment show at the Royal Television Society Awards 2016.
