= Hider in the House =

- Genre: Children's, entertainment
- Starring: JK and Joel (2007–2008); Kate Edmondson (2008)
- Country of origin: United Kingdom
- No. of series: 2
- No. of episodes: 43

Production
- Running time: 60 minutes

Original release
- Network: BBC Two
- Release: 17 February 2007 – 1 June 2008

Hider in the House is a British children's game show presented by Jason King and Joel Ross (a.k.a. JK and Joel). In the programme, a celebrity has to be hidden in a family's house by three children and a parent. If the family has fewer than three children, they use friends or related children. The other parent of the family thinks they are taking part in a totally different programme. The children involved must undergo a series of tasks to win prizes which they will receive if the parent does not realise what is really happening.

The format, which was devised by Eyeworks UK, won the Best Entertainment prize at the 2008 Rose d'Or ceremony.

== Series history ==
In late 2006, CBBC put an advert on their website for families wishing to take part in a new Saturday morning gameshow, advertised as Our House. This was the cover show for Hider in the House. The first series was shown on Saturdays between 9 am and 10 am on BBC Two and the CBBC Channel. The first episode was shown on 17 February 2007, and the first series finished on 30 June 2007. The second series was shown from 6 January 2008 to 1 June 2008. It was changed from Saturday to Sunday because of Basil's Swap Shop.

== Synopsis ==
If the hider failed a challenge, they were given a forfeit for the children to win back the prizes. In Series One, it was 'Suck the Sock' where the hider had to suck a sock full of smoothie to win the prizes back. Sometimes, the sock was changed to another thing associated with the celebrity. For example, for Steph Orleans and Malak, it became 'Lick the Sock'.

In Series Two, the forfeit was sometimes Lick the Taches, where they had to lick a substance moustache off their face. An example of this is Lil' Chris in Week 3 when he had to lick a moustache of tartar sauce off his face. In certain episodes, it was still 'Suck the Sock'. However, there was only one forfeit per episode and that was taken on the first failed challenge. For Dani Harmer in Week 1, it was 'Suck Nan's Tights'.

The show went through a reformatting, with JK and Joel being joined by presenter, Kate Edmondson, as JK and Joel had to go undercover because too many people knew about Hider in the House. Kate is the supposed presenter of a new cover show Big Kidz. Two challenges were cut from the show. The final challenge ('Hider in the House') was changed slightly. Instead of just the parent trying to find the real celebrity, it was changed so the children have to find mini cut outs of the celebrity, and for the parents, the real one, with clues from JK and Joel. Also, the celebrity has to Push the Pedal and gunge the unsuspecting parent, otherwise, the children don't get the prizes they have won. During the Chico episode, Push the Pedal, all the gunge landed on Chico's leg. However, JK had a bucket of gunge ready and poured it over the parents. The parents also received a large cardboard certificate, as well as being "hidered". JK went undercover for the fourth challenge to get the parents out of the way so the kids and the hider could get out of the house. JK sometimes drops hints of Hider in the House (e.g. while pretending to be a gardener, he said the name of a fake plant which involved the word "hider" (hiderdendrum) and while pretending to be from the army he said his last name was "hider"). The parent rarely notices these hints.

In the sixth episode of the second series, David Grant was busted early when an unfortunate incident led to him being discovered on the first day. Due to the unusual circumstances, and because JK felt partially responsible, the three presenters discussed what to do. They offered the children the opportunity to continue playing, but on the condition that if they lost the challenges, they would lose all the prizes they had already won. Unsuspecting friends and family were substituted for the parent. This is the first and only time that this happened.

== Episode list ==
=== Series 1 ===
Episode No.	Hider
1	Matt Stevens
2	Christopher Parker
3	Anna Ryder Richardson
4	Colin Jackson
5	Bonnie Langford
6	Myleene Klass
7	Lee Dixon
8	Charlie Dimmock
9	Louisa Lytton
10	Garth Crooks
11	Jason Donovan
12	Ian H. Watkins
13	Sarah Cawood
14	Tommy Walsh
15	Nadia Sawalha
16	Jenni Falconer
17	Nigel Marven
18	Siân Lloyd
19	Sheree Murphy
20	Linda Barker

=== Series 2 ===
Episode No.	Hider
1	Dani Harmer
2	Matt Di Angelo
3	Lil' Chris
4	Carol Smillie
5	Barney Harwood
6	David Grant
7	Lee Sharpe
8	Saira Khan
9	Ray Quinn
10	Mark Ramprakash
11	Keith Chegwin
12	David Seaman
13	Aggie MacKenzie
14	Michaela Strachan
15	Kirsten O'Brien
16	Dominic Littlewood
17	Jennie Bond
18	Hayley Tamaddon
19	Chico Slimani
20	Craig Revel Horwood

- Week 21: Hider in the House Awards
- Week 22: Best Bits of Hider in the House (Part 1)
- Week 23: Best Bits of Hider in the House (Part 2)

== Awards ==
The series won the Best Entertainment prize at the prestigious 2008 Rose d'Or ceremony.
