= Only in America (TV series) =

- Title card
- Genre: Travelogue
- Directed by: Paul Giddings
- Presented by: Fearne Cotton; Reggie Yates
- Theme music composer: James Burrell
- Country of origin: United Kingdom
- Original language: English
- No. of series: 1
- No. of episodes: 10

Production
- Executive producer: Sue Morgan
- Producer: Carolyn Clancy
- Production location: United States of America
- Editor: Duncan Bragg
- Camera setup: Mat Bryant
- Running time: 27 minutes

Original release
- Network: CBBC
- Release: 15 October – 30 December 2005

Only in America is a children's television programme that originally aired in 2005 on the CBBC Channel. It is presented by Fearne Cotton and Reggie Yates.

They are sent on a roadtrip of a lifetime around the United States to discover its attractions, starting in Las Vegas, where they find diners, donuts, shoe trees and Elvis impersonators.

== Episodes ==
=== Series One ===
1. Las Vegas – Fearne Cotton and Reggie Yates hit Vegas, finding diners, donuts and an Elvis lookalike.
2. American Dreams – Fearne Cotton and Reggie Yates hit New York in time for the Fourth of July celebrations.
3. Space – In a space special, Fearne and Reggie defy gravity, spin into orbit and uncover UFOs.
4. Wild West – Fearne Cotton and Reggie Yates wander way out into the Wild West of Arizona.
5. Proms – Fearne and Reggie go back to class to find out what American high school is really like.
6. Water – Reggie and Fearne wander into the state of Florida and dive into watery fun.
7. Summer Camps – Fearne and Reggie hit the summer camps, including basketball camp and fashion camp.
8. Animals – The duo get close and personal with American animals, including Jake the Hollywood lion.
9. Inventions – The pair meet innovative kid inventors in California, including winners of the National TOYchallenge sponsored by Sally Ride Science, and computer game testers in forward-looking Seattle.
10. Superheroes – The bizarre world of superhero conventions, and a Star Wars collection like no other.
