= Pepsi Chart =

Top 40 countdown on UK radio (1993–2002)

The Pepsi Chart
- Other names: The Pepsi Network Chart Show
- Genre: Chart
- Running time: Sundays 4.00pm – 7.00pm
- Country of origin: United Kingdom
- Language: English
- Home station: 95.8 Capital FM
- TV adaptations: Channel 5
- Starring: Dr. Fox
- Created by: Unique Productions
- Original release: 1 August 1993 – 29 December 2002

The Pepsi Chart (previously known as "The Pepsi Network Chart Show") was a networked Sunday afternoon Top 40 countdown on UK radio that started life on 1 August 1993 with Neil 'Doctor' Fox hosting the show live from the Capital Radio studios in London. The Pepsi Chart show carried an emphasis in fun and was the UK's first personality-led chart show: the presenter was live and exciting and big-prize competitions were held.

The Pepsi Chart was produced for the Commercial Radio Companies Association by the Unique Broadcasting Company, who along with the (then) programme director of Capital Radio Richard Park, and Fox, came up with the new show concept. The show was broadcast on between 80 and 110 local commercial radio stations across the UK via SMS satellite. Locums for the 'Doctor' included Capital's own Steve Penk and Key 103 Manchester's Darren Proctor. Occasional guest presenters filled in, such as Richard Blackwood of MTV UK & Ireland fame.

The Top 10 of the Pepsi Chart was the same as the official Top 10 of the UK Singles Chart that was compiled by the Official Charts Company (OCC but then CIN) and which was used by the BBC's Radio 1 Official Chart Show. However, the lower positions of 11–40 on the Pepsi Chart combined sales with radio airplay data. The Pepsi Chart was a re-branded version of The Network Chart Show which had previously been compiled by MRIB until Pepsi took over sponsorship from Nescafé in August 1993. In 1995, it was called the Pepsi Network Chart Show, but in 1996 it was renamed the Pepsi Chart.

== Compilation ==
Different compilation methods of the chart show were employed in its time. Initially, the sales: airplay ratio for its 40-11 positions were 30:70, but later became 50:50. Sales data was provided by Chart Information Network (CIN - now known as The Official UK Charts Company) and airplay data from Music Control. The final chart show on the Sunday before the new year would air with a chart of the year, counting down the Top 40 most popular singles of that particular year. An exception took place in December 1999, the last countdown of the millennium, when the Top 40 of all time was compiled and aired instead. Elton John's Candle in the Wind came out as top. The Pepsi Chart Show used Satellite Media Services to receive new releases and interview cuts.

== Show format ==
Various logos used during its time on air

Over the years of the show's broadcast, little variation in the format was applied. A typical 3-hour show was aired live between 4pm and 7pm each Sunday, and consisted of the standard 40-1 singles countdown with the inclusion of recaps after every 10 songs. Competition announcements, live calls from contestants, interviews with the artists making that particular week's chart, and advertisements made up the remaining airtime. Criticism from chart purists and fans of the rival Radio 1 Official Top 40 show naturally included comment on the show's 40-11 compilation methods, regular advert slots interrupting the show, and the presenter talking over the starts and ends of music tracks in order to fit the show within the 3 hours. However, this presentation style was typical practice in commercial radio, anyway, and would have been no different from any other show featured on each of the participating stations. With the fun element in place, it was not unusual for the show to go "on the road" and broadcast live, backstage, from music events. The Smash Hits Poll Winners Party and Capital FM's own Party in the Park concerts were recurring occasions of popularity with the show. In April, 1997, the Pepsi Chart claimed a larger audience size than BBC Radio 1's Official Chart. In April, 1999, Music Week reported that despite BBC Radio 1's Official Chart receiving record numbers of listeners, the Pepsi Chart still had a bigger listening audience.

== Artist involvement ==
As well as standard reaction interviews with chart-toppers, artists were often asked by Fox to "introduce the number one to the country". At other times, over the course of the show, artists may be asked to phone in to the studio at intervals to "pester" Fox into revealing the number one track way before even the Top 10 had begun being counted down. At these scripted points, Fox would insist that they'd have to wait to the end, just as with the rest of the listeners. Artists managing to cling on to the top spot for a total of four weeks would be awarded a Pepsi Chart blue disc. Although not made entirely clear to the listeners what exactly this blue disc was, its appearance was similar to those presented in Silver and Gold Record awards.

== Station participation ==
Requirements for a radio station taking the show were that the station's coverage area was mostly in a "white-space", i.e. broadcasting to an audience not already covered by a rival participant. There were the odd exceptions to the rule, most notably when existing stations agreed for a new station to carry the show. Other requirements were that the station was a current CRCA member, and the ability to fulfill the obligation of playing a pre-determined number of show promos over the week during primetime to a specific number of the target 15-24 audience. As well as taking the Sunday afternoon show, stations were requested to air the 5-minute chart checkups as part of their usual programming on Monday and Wednesday evenings. Non-live audio clips were delivered via SMS and so stations were expected to have the facility and equipment already in place.

== Brand extensions ==
=== Channel 5 programme ===
Following the success of the radio show, The Pepsi Chart Show was launched on Channel 5 on 4 February 1998, as a rival to the BBC's Top of the Pops weekly music programme. The programme was made for the channel by Endemol's Initial, (with producer Malcolm Gerrie being previously behind Channel 4's The Tube), and was the channel's first advertiser-supplied programming deal.

Filming initially took place at the Hanover Grand venue near to London's Regent Street, with Rhona Mitra and Eddy Temple-Morris as presenters. Over time, the show moved on to the Sound venue at nearby Leicester Square, with Fox himself at the helm of the show, usually broadcast at 3.30pm on Saturdays. Live performances at the Sound nightclub were also used in Pepsi Chart TV shows overseas, combining these English language performances with local ones in countries such as Hungary, Poland, Mexico, Latin America (La Cartelera Pepsi) Russia, Thailand and Australia. The late Caroline Flack was the international presenter for several countries including Norway and Tahiti.

In 1998 The Pepsi Chart Show was one of the Top 30 most-watched shows on Channel 5, but ultimately the TV show never really made much of an impact on the music television audience share, with likely blames being a combination of both restrictions in the analogue terrestrial transmission coverage of Channel 5 at the time, and occasionally a failure in attracting appearances from the bigger-name pop acts. There were notably more live performances from the more 'alternative' acts, and as a result, the TV show sometimes did not fully reflect the music in the radio version of the Pepsi Chart, which was more biased towards commercial radio airplay's hit music.

In the programme's last year it lost two-thirds of its audience, with 100,000 viewers watching the Saturday afternoon programme when the show was axed by Kevin Lygo, Channel 5's new programming boss. The last edition went out on 25 June 2002 with Abbie Eastwood and Matt Brown being the final regular presenters of the series. Since The Pepsi Chart Show, the channel has not broadcast a regular weekly chart show in its schedules, though since being owned by ViacomCBS, Channel 5 has broadcast a number of series featuring retro countdowns on a Friday night, under names such as The Greatest Hits of the 80s and Britain's Biggest 90s Hits. Unlike The Pepsi Chart Show, these shows (featuring a year-by-year countdown of hits from 1970 to 1999) are made in-house by Viacom International Studios UK (VIS) and use data supplied by The Official Charts Company.

=== Doctor Fox's Chart Update ===
Doctor Fox's Chart Update was a Pepsi Chart branded spin-off aired as a 5-minute slot on Channel 5 on Monday evenings, providing a recap of the previous night's new Top 10 (as in those days, the chart was published on Sundays at 7pm, rather than on Fridays at 5:45pm as is the case now).

=== Compilation albums ===
Despite the end of the Channel 5 TV show, the Pepsi Chart brand remained strong, helped along by its continued use in exclusive promotional CDs and autoscan radios that were offered to consumers of Pepsi and 7-Up soft drinks. Commercial compilation albums featuring artists from the chart were also produced for the mainstream music market, and frequently boasted chart-topping positions in the compilations category. Other than music CDs, annuals, board games and music quiz DVDs also found their way into high street stores. The Pepsi Chart brand had also managed to spread to other parts of the world, including countries such as The Netherlands, Ireland and Thailand.

== Sponsorship ==
Pepsi took over as sponsors of The Network Chart Show in August 1993 from Nescafé, with a complete overhaul of the original show's format. After nine successful years, in late 2002, Pepsi announced the termination of their sponsorship of the show. However, Music & Media reported in July, 2002, that Channel 5 had dropped the Pepsi Chart Show due to poor viewer ratings.

In January 2003, the show became Hit40UK, and coincided with launch of the ill-fated rival chart show: the Smash Hits! chart. On 14 June 2009, Hit40UK became The Big Top 40 Show, powered by iTunes.

== List of albums ==
Here is a complete list of the compilation albums released.

1. Hits Zone '97 (1997)
2. Hits Zone The Best of '97 (1997)
3. The Best Pepsi Chart Album in the World ...Ever! (1999)
4. The Best Pepsi Chart Album in the World ...Ever! 2000 (2000)
5. Pepsi Chart 2001 (2000)
6. The New Pepsi Chart Album (2001)
7. Pepsi Chart 2002 (2001)
8. New! Pepsi Chart 2002 (2002)
9. Pepsi Chart 2003 (2002)
10. Listen Up (2003) (not so much a Pepsi Chart album but an album based on Pepsi. It was free in Popworld magazine).

Additionally, there was a released DVD titled Pepsi Chart Music Quiz in 2002.
