= The Official Chart =

British music chart programme

- Other names: The Official Chart on Radio 1
- Genre: Top 40
- Running time: (1 Hr 45 Mins) - Friday Main Chart (4 - 5:45pm) (3 Hours) - Sunday First Look (4 - 7pm)
- Country of origin: United Kingdom
- Language: English
- Home station: BBC Radio 1
- Hosted by: Various (as of 2022, Jack Saunders)
- Produced by: Various
- Recording studio: Broadcasting House, London
- Original release: 1 October 1967 – present
- Audio format: Stereo

The Official Chart is a long-running United Kingdom music chart programme, airing each Friday afternoon on BBC Radio 1. It airs the UK singles chart compiled by the Official Charts Company.

In July 2015 The Official Chart moved from its traditional Sunday slot to Friday afternoons, to coincide with the global change in new music release dates from Mondays to Fridays. The chart airs between 16:00 and 17:45.

== History ==
Pick of the Pops, as the chart was originally known, transferred to Radio One from the BBC Light Programme in October 1967, along with host Alan Freeman. Tom Browne took over in 1972 with Solid Gold Sixty. This consisted of two hours featuring Radio One playlist tracks which were not in the Top 20 (broadcast on 247 metres Medium Wave and carried on VHF by some location BBC radio stations), followed by a one-hour Top 20 rundown from 6pm - 7pm (carried also on BBC Radio 2's FM transmitters). Starting from March 1974, the playlist tracks were incorporated into Paul Burnett's 'All There Is To Hear', and the Tom Browne show was reduced to just the Top 20 for one hour at 18:00.

In April 1978, Simon Bates took over as presenter. From May 1978, Radio One started promoting the Top 40 instead of the Top 30 in its Tuesday chart countdowns and daytime programming. This was because the Top 50 was increased to the BBC Top 75 that month.

From November 1978 the Sunday chart show was extended to a two-hour countdown of the entire top 40. At first, every record was played, but as there was insufficient time to play enough of each record, during the 1980s some songs dropping down the chart were excluded. Other hosts during this period were Tony Blackburn, Tommy Vance, Richard Skinner and Bruno Brookes.

From 6 January 1991, every song in the top 40 was played but despite the fast presentational style adopted by the show's presenter Mark Goodier, there wasn't enough time for every song to be played in full as the programme's length of 2 hours 29 minutes also had to include the links and chart rundowns. This was rectified in March 1992 when the programme was extended to three hours, and the programme now ran from 4pm until 7pm. Bruno Brookes and Mark Goodier continued to host the programme until April 1995, at which point Brookes was replaced by Goodier as permanent host until his own departure in 2002.

After this point, the show had a variety of different names and presenters in guest and permanent roles.

In recent years the show has reflected changes in the music industry. In 2005 downloads began to be included as part of the top 40, and from July 2014 the show has also included audio streaming alongside physical sales.

Between February 2012 and August 2014 the show also streamed visually with music videos of the top 10 singles aired simultaneously on the Radio 1 website.

On 24 March 2015, it was announced that in July 2015 the show would be moving from a standalone show in its traditional Sunday night slot to a new position on Friday afternoons as part of Greg James' afternoon show. The move was due to an international agreement by the music industry to release all new albums and singles on Fridays. The new chart played the top 25 in full rather than the top 40 that had previously been broadcast. The change in presenter meant that Clara Amfo became the shortest-serving permanent host of the show. The Sunday night slot was replaced with a new show hosted by Cel Spellman and Katie Thistleton.

Since 17 February 2017, only the new entries and highest climbers from the top 40 are played with the top 10 played in full after 5 o'clock.

The programme has run weekly with exceptions if when major royal events take place.

== Presenters ==
The names in italics indicates a co-host for the show.

From	To	Duration	Presenter(s)		Format
From	To	Duration	Main	Cover(s)	Format
1 October 1967	24 September 1972	4 years, 359 days	Alan Freeman	Unknown	Known as Pick of the Pops and featured new entries between numbers 21 and 30 and the complete Top 20.
1 October 1972	17 March 1974	5 years, 176 days	Tom Browne	Johnnie Walker	A three-hour show called Solid Gold Sixty featuring new releases, climbers and chart entries below the Top 20 from 16:00–18:00, followed by the Top 20 itself from 18:00–19:00.
24 March 1974	26 March 1978	5 years, 176 days	Tom Browne	Paul Burnett; Simon Bates	Reduced to just the Top 20, running from 18:00–19:00.
2 April 1978	5 November 1978	1 year, 146 days	Simon Bates	None	Reduced to just the Top 20, running from 18:00–19:00.
12 November 1978	26 August 1979	1 year, 146 days	Simon Bates	Andy Peebles	Extended to a two-hour Top 40 from 17:00–19:00.
2 September 1979	3 January 1982	2 years, 123 days	Tony Blackburn	None	Extended to a two-hour Top 40 from 17:00–19:00.
10 January 1982	1 January 1984	1 year, 356 days	Tommy Vance	Simon Bates; Andy Peebles	Extended to a two-hour Top 40 from 17:00–19:00.
8 January 1984	23 September 1984	259 days	Simon Bates	Richard Skinner	Extended to a two-hour Top 40 from 17:00–19:00.
30 September 1984	23 March 1986	1 year, 174 days	Richard Skinner	Tommy Vance; Simon Bates; Bruno Brookes	Extended to a two-hour Top 40 from 17:00–19:00.
30 March 1986	23 September 1990	4 years, 177 days	Bruno Brookes	Tommy Vance; Simon Bates; Gary Davies; Mark Goodier	Extended to a two-hour Top 40 from 17:00–19:00.
30 September 1990	30 December 1990	1 year, 153 days	Mark Goodier	none	Extended to a two-hour Top 40 from 17:00–19:00.
6 January 1991	1 March 1992	1 year, 153 days	Mark Goodier	Tommy Vance	Extended to a two-and-a-half-hour Top 40 from 16:30–19:00.
8 March 1992		N/A	None (Note: These time periods indicate a change in primary hosts during which the show was presented by covers.)	Tommy Vance	Extended to a two-and-a-half-hour Top 40 from 16:30–19:00.
15 March 1992	16 April 1995	3 years, 32 days	Bruno Brookes	Simon Bates; Mark Goodier; Neale James	Extended to a three-hour Top 40 from 16:00–19:00. Digital downloads were included in the chart from 17 April 2005.
23 April 1995	17 November 2002	7 years, 208 days	Mark Goodier	Dave Pearce; Clive Warren; Judge Jules; Scott Mills	Extended to a three-hour Top 40 from 16:00–19:00. Digital downloads were included in the chart from 17 April 2005.
24 November 2002	2 February 2003	70 days	None	Various	Extended to a three-hour Top 40 from 16:00–19:00. Digital downloads were included in the chart from 17 April 2005.
9 February 2003	30 January 2005	1 year, 356 days	Wes Butters	Scott Mills	Extended to a three-hour Top 40 from 16:00–19:00. Digital downloads were included in the chart from 17 April 2005.
6 February 2005	27 February 2005	21 days	None	Various	Extended to a three-hour Top 40 from 16:00–19:00. Digital downloads were included in the chart from 17 April 2005.
6 March 2005	30 September 2007	2 years, 208 days	Jason King; Joel Ross	Scott Mills	Extended to a three-hour Top 40 from 16:00–19:00. Digital downloads were included in the chart from 17 April 2005.
7 October 2007		N/A	None	Scott Mills	Extended to a three-hour Top 40 from 16:00–19:00. Digital downloads were included in the chart from 17 April 2005.
14 October 2007	20 September 2009	1 year, 341 days	Fearne Cotton; Reggie Yates	Scott Mills	Extended to a three-hour Top 40 from 16:00–19:00. Digital downloads were included in the chart from 17 April 2005.
27 September 2009	23 December 2012	3 years, 87 days	Reggie Yates	Scott Mills; Greg James; Dev; Huw Stephens	Extended to a three-hour Top 40 from 16:00–19:00. Digital downloads were included in the chart from 17 April 2005.
30 December 2012	6 January 2013	7 days	None	Scott Mills	A new background theme was introduced in February 2012. Music videos for the top 10 songs were streamed online from 26 February 2012 to 31 August 2014.
13 January 2013	8 December 2013	2 years, 5 days	Jameela Jamil	Scott Mills	A new background theme was introduced in February 2012. Music videos for the top 10 songs were streamed online from 26 February 2012 to 31 August 2014.
15 December 2013	22 December 2013	2 years, 5 days	Jameela Jamil; Jason Derulo (15 December); Scott Mills (22 December)	None	A new background theme was introduced in February 2012. Music videos for the top 10 songs were streamed online from 26 February 2012 to 31 August 2014.
29 December 2013	18 January 2015	2 years, 5 days	Jameela Jamil	Scott Mills; Dev	Audio streaming was included in the chart from 6 July 2014.
25 January 2015	5 July 2015	161 days	Clara Amfo	Scott Mills; Greg James; Dev	Audio streaming was included in the chart from 6 July 2014.
10 July 2015	20 October 2017	2 years, 102 days	Greg James	Dev; Scott Mills; MistaJam	The chart moved to Friday afternoons airing from 16:00–17:45 (till 18:00 on Bank Holidays). A new background theme was introduced. At the beginning of the period, the top 25 songs were played in full while the songs at 26-40 were mentioned briefly along with a short clip.
27 October 2017	8 December 2017	42 days	None (Note: Greg James received primary billing for these shows, but he remained completely absent during these time periods.)	MistaJam	The format changed in February 2017 to feature the Top 10 played in full (beginning from 5 pm after Newsbeat) with all new entries & big climbers getting a full play along with a select few other songs whilst the other song were quickly mentioned without a 30-sec clip. The top five albums were also announced. The singles at 10-3 were re-mentioned quickly with a short clip before announcing the top 2 singles.
15 December 2017	9 March 2018	84 days	Greg James	Scott Mills; Jordan North; MistaJam	The format changed in February 2017 to feature the Top 10 played in full (beginning from 5 pm after Newsbeat) with all new entries & big climbers getting a full play along with a select few other songs whilst the other song were quickly mentioned without a 30-sec clip. The top five albums were also announced. The singles at 10-3 were re-mentioned quickly with a short clip before announcing the top 2 singles.
16 March 2018	20 April 2018	35 days	None	MistaJam; Scott Mills; Jordan North; Dev	The Newsbeat at 5pm was cancelled to accommodate more songs to be played in the show. Top 10 starts from 5:05 - 5:45 pm.
27 April 2018	18 May 2018	21 days	None	MistaJam	The Newsbeat at 5pm was cancelled to accommodate more songs to be played in the show. Top 10 starts from 5:05 - 5:45 pm.
25 May 2018	8 June 2018	14 days	Greg James	None	The Newsbeat at 5pm was cancelled to accommodate more songs to be played in the show. Top 10 starts from 5:05 - 5:45 pm.
15 June 2018	19 August 2022	8 years, 93 days	Scott Mills	Jordan North; Cel Spellman; Katie Thistleton; Vick Hope; Jack Saunders	The background theme was remastered based on the July 2015 version. Before announcing the top 2 singles, the singles at 20-3 are re-mentioned quickly without a short clip. Video streaming included in the chart from 6 July 2018. A new background theme was introduced in September 2020, which was replaced by another in September 2022 and then another one in January 2024
26 August 2022	2 September 2022	8 days	None	James Cusack	The background theme was remastered based on the July 2015 version. Before announcing the top 2 singles, the singles at 20-3 are re-mentioned quickly without a short clip. Video streaming included in the chart from 6 July 2018. A new background theme was introduced in September 2020, which was replaced by another in September 2022 and then another one in January 2024
16 September 2022	Present	3 years, 363 days	Jack Saunders	Jordan North; James Cusack; Sam & Danni Sian Eleri (co-hosted with Jack at BBC Radio 1's Big Weekend 2024 in Luton)	The background theme was remastered based on the July 2015 version. Before announcing the top 2 singles, the singles at 20-3 are re-mentioned quickly without a short clip. Video streaming included in the chart from 6 July 2018. A new background theme was introduced in September 2020, which was replaced by another in September 2022 and then another one in January 2024

== The Official Chart Update ==
The Official Chart Update
- Genre: Top 10
- Running time: 15 minutes (5:30 pm – 5:45 pm)
- Country of origin: United Kingdom
- Language: English
- Home station: BBC Radio 1
- Hosted by: Nick Grimshaw
- Recording studio: Broadcasting House, London
- Original release: 10 March 2010 – 8 July 2019
- Audio format: Stereo

Beginning on 10 March 2010, The Official Chart Update brand was launched giving an insight into the Official Singles Chart as it stands during the week. It originally aired on BBC Radio 1 on Wednesday afternoons hosted by Greg James, with a television version aired on MTV Music and MTV Hits.

In 2012 Scott Mills took over as host of The Official Chart Update with Jameela Jamil as co-host. Clara Amfo became the co-host of the show after Jamil left the show in early 2015. In mid-2015, Mills and Amfo left the show and James once again became the primary host of the show. Throughout the show's run Dev, Huw Stephens, and Matt Edmondson have filled in as cover presenters.

When the Official Chart moved to Fridays in July 2015, The Official Chart Update moved from Wednesdays to Mondays at 17:30 until 8 July 2019. The show was then replaced by The Official Chart: First Look.

=== Format ===
From its inception to 1 July 2015, several songs such as the re-entry(ies), new entry(ies), highest climbers and the Number 1 single were played in the show. The songs at 2–40 were mentioned briefly before playing the Number 1 single. Since 13 July 2015, the chart update is presented with the songs at 4–10 being mentioned briefly along with a short clip while the top 3 are played in full.

=== Presenters ===
From	To	Tenure	Timeslot	Presenter(s)		
From	To	Tenure	Timeslot	Host	Co-host	Cover
10 March 2010	28 March 2012	2 years, 18 days	Wednesdays, 15:30 – 16:00	Greg James	Chris Moyles; Comedy Dave (11 May 2011)	Dev; Scott Mills; Reggie Yates
4 April 2012	19 December 2012	259 days	Wednesdays, 16:00 – 16:30	Greg James	None	Huw Stephens
9 January 2013	14 January 2015	2 years, 5 days	Wednesdays, 15:30 – 16:00	Scott Mills	Jameela Jamil	Huw Stephens; Dev; Matt Edmondson
21 January 2015	1 July 2015	161 days	Wednesdays, 15:30 – 16:00	Scott Mills	Clara Amfo	Dev; Matt Edmondson
13 July 2015	16 July 2018	3 years, 3 days	Mondays, 17:30 – 17:45	Greg James	None	Dev
23 July 2018	27 August 2018	35 days	Mondays, 17:30 – 17:45	Dev; Alice Levine	None	None
3 September 2018	8 July 2019	308 days	Mondays, 17:30 – 17:45	Nick Grimshaw	None	Jordan North

== The Official Chart: First Look ==
The Official Chart: First Look
- Other names: The Official Chart: First Look on Radio 1
- Genre: Top 40
- Running time: 180 minutes (4:00 pm – 7:00 pm)
- Country of origin: United Kingdom
- Language: English
- Home station: BBC Radio 1
- Hosted by: Lauren Layfield
- Recording studio: Past Media City, Salford, Manchester Current Birmingham
- Original release: 14 July 2019 – present
- Audio format: Stereo

The Official Chart: First Look is the show which provides the update on how the chart looks over the weekend. The show is on air during the historic Sunday slot, which is 16:00 - 19:00 pm, and hosted by Lauren Layfield

It replaces The Official Chart Update that was on air every Monday at 5:30 - 5:45 pm previously. It gives the fastest aggregated picture of the new week's biggest hits for the UK, reflecting popularity across the full spectrum of the Official Charts' sales and streams panel - including all of the UK's key download and streaming services, including Spotify, Amazon, Apple Music, iTunes, Deezer, Google and many more.

The show was launched on 14 July 2019. It focuses on the Top 20 biggest tracks from data collected on Friday and Saturday.

In September 2020, Vick Hope joined as the co-host of the show with Katie Thistleton. She replaced Cel Spellman as he focused on other acting and broadcasting work, even though the station says he will remain as a part of the Radio 1 family.

=== Presenters ===
From	To	Tenure	Timeslot	Presenter(s)	
From	To	Tenure	Timeslot	Main	Cover
14 July 2019	30 August 2020	1 year, 47 days	Sundays, 18:00 – 19:00	Katie Thistleton; Cel Spellman	Riyadh Khalaf
6 September 2020	31 March 2024	3 years, 207 days	Sundays, 18:00 – 19:00	Katie Thistleton; Vick Hope	Lauren Layfield Shanequa Paris
7 April 2024	6th September 2026	2 years, 162 days	Sundays, 18:00 - 19:00	Lauren Layfield; Shanequa Paris	Calum Leslie Pete Allison Emma Louise Amanshia Polly Bayfield
13th September 2026	Current	N/a	Sundays, 16:00 - 19:00	Lauren Layfield	TBC

== See also ==
- Timeline of chart shows on UK radio
