= Dance Factory =

BBC children's television show

- Dance Factory title card
- Genre: Children's Competition
- Directed by: Samantha Beddoes; Rob Hyde
- Presented by: Reggie Yates; Nigel Clarke; Camilla Dallerup
- Theme music composer: D Factor (Dobs Vye)
- Country of origin: United Kingdom
- Original language: English
- No. of seasons: 1

Production
- Executive producer: Sue Morgan
- Producer: Pete Davies
- Editors: Nial Brown; Chris Toft
- Camera setup: Nigel Bradley; Tom Hayward
- Running time: 25 minutes

Original release
- Network: CBBC
- Release: 26 March – 21 May 2005

Dance Factory is a children's television show which ran for nine weeks from March to May 2005 at 10.30am on BBC One. It was simulcast on the CBBC Channel. It is hosted by Reggie Yates, with co-presenters Camilla Dallerup and Nigel Clarke.

The aim of the show is to pair six non-dancers with experts their own age in Bhangra, Irish dancing, pop, tap dancing, hip hop and musical theatre styles. The contestants are drawn from all over the UK, and auditions were held in London, Manchester, Birmingham, Cardiff, Glasgow and Belfast.

The next phase of the show sees the experts teaching their new partners how to dance, and also saw them meeting some showbiz stars to pick up tips along the way. These included Michael Flatley, of Riverdance fame; Rio Ferdinand, the England and Manchester United star; Denise Lewis, Olympic gold medallist (also seen in Strictly Come Dancing) and the cast of Chitty Chitty Bang Bang in London's West End.

After six weeks of intense training and rehearsal, the contestants are thrust into live semi-finals, each of which saw one pair eliminated from the competition by CBBC viewers. The musical theatre pair of Stacey and Josh were eliminated first, followed by Teejay and Tom, the Bhangra pair, the week after.

In a specially-extended final, the Irish dancing pair of Claire Johnstone, age 12, and Gavin Boyle, age 16, won the title of Dance Factory Champions and a trip to New York City. The runners up were Naoimh and her partner, dancing tap.
