= Draw Your Own Toons =

- Created by: The Walt Disney Company
- Presented by: Fearne Cotton (1998-2001); Jim Jinkins (1998-99); Howy Parkins (2001)
- Country of origin: United Kingdom
- Original language: English
- No. of series: 4
- No. of episodes: 20

Production
- Running time: approx. 24 minutes per episode
- Production company: Buena Vista Productions UK for Meridian

Original release
- Network: ITV (CITV)
- Release: 26 October 1998 – 16 November 2001

Draw Your Own Toons is a British television programme that was produced by Buena Vista Productions UK and Meridian Broadcasting for CITV. Four series were aired between 1998 and 2001. Each series was broadcast over the space of a week in either October or December. Then-current Diggit presenter Fearne Cotton presented all four series, and co-presented with Jim Jinkins for series 1–2 and Howy Parkins for series 4.

== Format ==
The main idea behind the show was to teach viewers how they could become artists and replicate the work of Disney artists. Each episode focused upon a different aspect of drawing cartoons. The presenters also met with the artists and directors behind Disney shows such as The Weekenders.
