= Jack Saunders (presenter) =

British radio DJ and TV presenter

- Born: 24 September 1992 (age 33)
- Education: Nottingham Trent University
- Occupations: DJ; radio presenter; television presenter
- Years active: 2014–present
- Employer: BBC

Jack Saunders (born 24 September 1992) is a British radio DJ and television presenter. He is best known for presenting BBC Radio 1's New Music Show every weeknight as well as The Official Chart on Fridays.

== Career ==
=== Radio ===
Saunders studied Broadcast Journalism at Nottingham Trent University, graduating in 2014. He managed the university's student radio station, during which time it won seven student radio awards.

Starting in June 2014, Saunders hosted the 10am to 1pm Sunday slot on Kerrang! Radio. He started at Radio X in 2015, hosting the early weekend breakfast show. He went on to cover various shows, including The Chris Moyles Show, and then hosted the mid-morning slot until April 2018. Toby Tarrant took over hosting the slot.

In September 2018, Saunders began hosting the 11pm-1am slot on BBC Radio 1. The show focuses on rock, indie, and alternative music. In September 2020, the show moved an hour earlier at 10pm-12am, as part of a wider timetable change. Mondays to Wednesdays are devoted to Future Artists, whilst Thursdays are devoted to the Indie Show. In September 2021, the show moved two hours earlier to 8pm-10pm to take over from Rickie, Melvin and Charlie, who since moved to the Live Lounge slot. In July 2022, it was announced that Saunders would be the new host of The Official Chart, taking over from Scott Mills, who left for BBC Radio 2. At the same time, Saunders' Indie Show moved to Sundays at 9pm instead of Thursday at 8pm, where it was replaced by the Future Pop show with Mollie King.

In July 2022 Saunders joined up with The Prodigy as a support DJ for the band's comeback UK Tour which included dates in Sheffield, Liverpool and Birmingham.

Saunders was announced as the new host of Radio 1's flagship new music show in December 2023, taking over from Clara Amfo from April 2024. At the same time, he was replaced on Future Artists by Sian Eleri.

=== Television ===
Saunders also works as a presenter on MTV. He is the host of the weekly MTV Rocks Chart on MTV Music.

In 2019, Saunders and Yungblud featured together on an episode of Celebrity Gogglebox.

In 2022, Saunders joined Clara Amfo in hosting the reformatted Top of the Pops Christmas special, in the first year in which the programme switched from a performance-based format to discussion and recorded highlights of the year's music events and chart hits; subsequent years have seen the same format maintained with Amfo hosting alone.

Since 2022, Saunders has been part of the BBC presentation team for coverage of the Glastonbury Festival.

In 2022, MTV UK recommissioned new-music series Gonzo, previously hosted by Zane Lowe between 2002 and 2015, for a new series hosted by Saunders. The show - initially airing fortnightly half-hour editions before switching to hour-long monthly programmes in later years - was axed by MTV in June 2025 as a result of layoffs which made most of MTV's Camden-based music programming production staff redundant.

=== Streaming ===
During the COVID-19 pandemic in 2020, Saunders started Quarantine Karaoke on Twitch. The series sees artists join him for interviews and karaoke. Since then, he set up a weekly thing called Feedback Friday, a commentary on the best new music, airing Fridays on Twitch.

== Personal life ==
Saunders is a fan of Arsenal.

Media offices
| Preceded by Scott Mills | BBC Radio 1 chart show presenter 9 September 2022 – present | Succeeded by Incumbent |
