= Escape from Scorpion Island =

Children's television game show

- Genre: Game show
- Presented by: Caroline Flack and Reggie Yates (series 1); Jason King and Joel Ross (series 2–3); Myleene Klass and Johny Pitts (series 4–5)
- Countries of origin: United Kingdom; Australia (series 2–5)
- No. of episodes: 84 (UK); 86 (AUS)

Production
- Production locations: Fernando de Noronha, Brazil (series 1); Mission Beach, Queensland, Australia (series 2–3); Tallebudgera Valley, Queensland, Australia (series 4–5)
- Running time: 30–60 mins
- Production companies: RDF Television (series 1); The Foundation (series 2–5); Freehand (series 2–5)

Original release
- Network: BBC One (UK series 1); BBC Two (UK series 2); CBBC Channel (UK series 3–5); ABC1 (Australia series 2–3); ABC3 (Australia series 4–5)
- Release: 3 September 2007 – 25 July 2011

Escape from Scorpion Island is a British-Australian children's TV adventure game show in which contestants try to 'escape from an exotic island with a mind of its own' by doing various challenges to improve their chances of escaping. Series 1 was produced by RDF Television for CBBC and was filmed in Brazil, while series 2 onwards were produced by The Foundation/Freehand for CBBC and ABC Television and were filmed in Australia.

The show has been presented by 3 different sets of presenters; Caroline Flack and Reggie Yates (series 1), Jason King and Joel Ross (series 2–3) and Myleene Klass and Johny Pitts (series 4–5). The show ran for five series across four years before being cancelled in 2011 following the end of BBC's and ABC's partnership.

== Format ==
Filming locations in Australia

A number of adventurers, aged 11–14 and from the UK and Australia, are brought to a fictional island called 'Scorpion Island', a tropical and exotic island that appears to have a mind of its own. Once on the island the adventurers are divided into two teams, usually either 'Team Sting' or 'Team Claw', though series 3 featured a third team called 'Team Venom', and for the first half of series 5 the teams were boys versus girls. The number of adventures on each team are usually fixed, though a team may lose, gain and swap members as the show goes on, depending on the series. The ultimate goal of each series for each team is to escape the island, so along the way the teams compete in various challenges to better their chances of escaping the island. Whoever wins the final challenge escapes the island while the losing team(s) are left behind.

The show has been filmed in a variety of different locations and each series introduces different challenges and storylines. The challenges were usually a mix of both mental challenges and main physical challenges, and the challenges are done in either small teams or individually. Sometimes a team who is successful in the first challenge gets an advantage in the following challenge, such as a time bonus.

The final escape consisted of tougher challenges done in multiple stages where everyone on each team is involved, and whoever wins each stage would get an advantage in the following stage and so on until the final round where the winning team escape the island.

== Series overview ==
=== Series 1 (2007) ===
The first series ran on BBC One from 3 September 2007 to 21 September 2007 and was presented by Caroline Flack and Reggie Yates and filmed in Fernando de Noronha, Brazil.

=== Series 2 (2008) ===
Series two premiered on 28 September 2008 on BBC Two and on 3 November 2008 on ABC1. It was hosted by Jason King and Joel Ross and was filmed in Mission Beach, Queensland, Australia in 2008.

=== Series 3 (2009) ===
The third series premiered on 5 April 2009 on CBBC and on 9 March 2009 on ABC1. It was hosted by Jason King and Joel Ross and was filmed in Mission Beach, Queensland, Australia in 2008.

=== Series 4 (2010) ===
Series four premiered on 9 August 2010 on CBBC, and on 13 October on ABC3. It was hosted by Myleene Klass and Johny Pitts and was filmed in Tallebudgera Valley, Queensland, Australia in April 2010.

=== Series 5 (2011) ===
The fifth and final series premiered on 11 March 2011 on ABC3. It was hosted by Myleene Klass and Johny Pitts and was filmed in Tallebudgera Valley, Queensland, Australia in April 2010. The series premiered on BBC Two on 16:05 on 20 May 2011 and concluded on 25 July.
