= Matt Edmondson =

British TV and radio presenter (born 1985)

- Born: Matthew Edmondson; 27 December 1985 (age 40); Portsmouth, Hampshire, England
- Occupations: Television and radio presenter
- Years active: 2002-present
- Employer(s): BBC, ITV
- Television: Fake Reaction; The Xtra Factor Live; Release the Hounds
- Spouse: Bryony Emmett (m. 2013)
- Children: 2
- Relatives: Kate Arnell (sister)
- Website: Twitter

Matthew Edmondson (born 27 December 1985) is a British television and Sony Award-nominated radio presenter, best known for his work with BBC Radio 1 and ITV2.

Edmondson currently presents the weekday afternoon show on Mondays, Tuesdays, Wednesdays and Thursdays from 1 pm to 3:30 pm with Mollie King on Radio 1. In 2016, he co-presented The Xtra Factor alongside Rylan Clark on ITV2.

== Career ==
=== Television ===
Edmondson was a CBBC continuity presenter from 2004 to 2006, prior to which, in 2002, he was a roving reporter for Channel 4's Richard & Judy.

Edmondson co-presented the 2008 coverage of the Isle of Wight Festival for ITV2. He also provided links and commentary for the MTV coverage of the 2008 MTV Europe Music Awards. He presented reports from T in the Park 2009 for BBC One Scotland, BBC Two Scotland and BBC Three.

Edmondson also provided voiceovers for 4Music and presented Channel 4's Freshly Squeezed from 2010 until 2011.

In May 2010, Edmondson presented highlights from The Great Escape Festival and the Topman CTRL Student Tour on Channel 4.

On 27 June 2016, it was announced that Edmondson would co-host The Xtra Factor Live alongside Rylan Clark-Neal on ITV2. The series began on 27 August 2016 and was broadcast live from The Hospital Club. The show was axed in January 2017.

Edmondson narrated the third series of Impractical Jokers UK on Channel 5 and Comedy Central in 2016. In 2017, Edmondson took part in the BBC's Let's Sing and Dance for Comic Relief.

In November 2016, Edmondson provided the voiceover for the adverts for Now That's What I Call Music! 95, when regular voiceover Mark Goodier suffered a stroke.

He presents the ITV2 dating series Dress to Impress. From 2017, Edmondson replaced Reggie Yates as the presenter of Release the Hounds on ITV2.

=== Radio ===
On 8 January 2010, Edmondson joined BBC Radio 1, and appeared every Friday on Fearne Cotton's show to report on entertainment news and showbiz gossip. His first appearance on Cotton's programme was on 15 January 2010.

Edmondson began presenting the Sunday 10 am to 1 pm slot on BBC Radio 1 on 14 March 2010, filling in for regular presenter Sara Cox while she was on maternity leave.

Edmondson started a weekly show on BBC Radio 1 on 6 April 2011 replacing Huw Stephens from 9 pm to 10 pm on Wednesdays. However, on 19 December 2012, he presented his last Wednesday night show before moving to weekends in January 2013, taking over Vernon Kay's Saturday 10 am – 1 pm slot and Sara Cox's Sunday 10 am – 1 pm slot.

On 10 April 2018, it was announced that Edmondson and Mollie King would co-present a new afternoon show for BBC Radio 1 beginning in June on Fridays, Saturdays and Sundays. In 2024, it was announced that they would be moving to weekdays (except Fridays) on Radio 1 in July.

In 2018, Edmondson hosted a BBC radio podcast programme in which he and his episode co-hosts, beginning with Amelia Dimoldenberg and Nina Nesbitt, deliberately vandalised Wikipedia to see how long the vandalism would last.

=== Other work ===
Edmondson was a columnist for The X Factor magazine. He appeared in the music video for the song "Make Peace Not War" by British grime artist Skepta.

Edmondson has designed several published board games through Format Games, which he founded in 2021 with his brother-in-law.

== Personal life ==
Edmondson is originally from Portsmouth and attended St Edmund's Catholic School and Havant College. He now lives in Lewisham, south-east London. His elder sister Kate Arnell is also a television presenter. In May 2012, Edmondson became engaged to his long-term girlfriend Bryony Emmett, and the pair married in 2013. In September 2016, Edmondson missed an episode of The Xtra Factor Live. During the show, it was announced that Bryony had gone into labour, and at the end of the show it was announced that she had given birth to a girl. In January 2022, Bryony gave a birth to a second girl. Edmondson has been diagnosed with cyclothymia, a form of bipolar disorder (considered to be a milder type). In 2020, Edmondson revealed in a Twitter thread that his father was an alcoholic with bipolar disorder who killed himself when Edmondson was 22. Edmondson wrote a song about it, "Your Car", with the vocals of Aymee Weir.
