= Neil Fox (broadcaster) =

English radio DJ and TV presenter

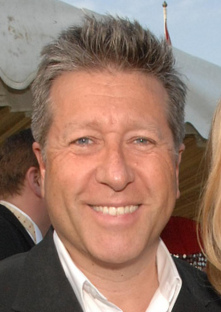
- Neil Fox at the 2007 ChildLine polo day at Ham Polo Club, London.
- Born: Neil Andrew Howe Fox; 12 June 1961 (age 65); Harrow, Middlesex, England
- Other names: Dr. Fox; Froggy
- Education: University of Bath
- Occupations: Radio and television broadcaster
- Children: 3

Neil Andrew Howe Fox (born 12 June 1961) is an English radio DJ and television presenter, known for many years as Dr Fox before he became "Foxy" in the 2000s, then simply as Neil Fox, M.D. before reemerging as "Dr Fox" in 2020 to host the UDJ "Heritage Chart" countdown.

He was a judge on Pop Idol between 2001 and 2003 alongside Simon Cowell, Pete Waterman and Nicki Chapman.

== Early life ==
Fox was born on 12 June 1961 in Harrow, Middlesex. As a boy he moved to Thames Ditton, Surrey, where he lived for a number of years. He was then educated at Kingston Grammar School in London and joined the Air Training Corps, before becoming a management student at the University of Bath, where he joined the student radio station University Radio Bath, and began his career as a radio presenter using the pseudonym Andrew Howe. After leaving university he worked as a binliner salesman. He does not hold an ordinary PhD or medical degree, but does have an honorary doctorate from the University of Bath in respect of his contributions to the media and charity.

== Career ==
=== Radio ===
==== Radio Wyvern ====
In 1984, he started his professional radio career on what is now Hits Radio Herefordshire & Worcestershire (then Radio Wyvern) in Hereford and Worcester, starting off with a show called Mellow Yellow. This was broadcast on Fridays from 9.00 pm to 11.00pm and Saturdays from 8.00 pm to 11.00 pm. In 1985, Fox took over the weekday show from 6.00 pm to 9.00 pm, before moving to their weekday show from 2.00 pm to 6.00 pm. He also presented a Saturday show for the station, which went out from 10.00 am to 1.00 pm. He remained there until late 1986, then joined Radio Luxembourg in February 1987 before joining Capital Radio in October the same year.

==== Capital Radio ====
Fox presented a show from 7.30 pm until 10.00 pm on Tuesdays and Thursdays (sharing weekday evenings with Pat Sharp), where some of his first shows were broadcast only on medium wave, because Capital were then broadcasting "adult" rock music on FM while mainstream chart music was played on MW. However, this soon ceased, the MW transmitters were given over to "oldies" station Capital Gold, and the FM service became Capital FM. He also presented a Saturday morning show.

In the very early 1990s, there was a short period during which Fox hosted a show starting at midnight on Saturday, specifically aimed at the club crowd. It was for this show that he adopted the moniker "Dr Fox", with the full title of the programme being "Dr Fox's Midnight Surgery". This was at the suggestion of Capital's Programme Director, Richard Park. Many people called the show for requests. Fox was well known for having banter with callers and the "Surgery" was soon extended to his weekday evening shows.

Fox was establishing himself as one of Capital FM's most popular DJs and in 1993 he began presenting the Sunday afternoon Network Chart Show, which owing to sponsorship went on to be called the Pepsi Network Chart before becoming simply the Pepsi Chart in 1996 and then hit40uk, sponsored by Woolworths in 2003. During Fox's tenure, this show, which had previously been hosted by David Jensen, overtook the official Top 40 show on BBC Radio 1 (broadcast at exactly the same time). In addition to this, he still continued with his evening show, although from 1995 he went out on Sundays to Thursdays. On Sundays, his show was from 7.00 pm to 8.30 pm, as he presented the Chart show beforehand. In 1997, it was rumoured that Matthew Bannister had offered Fox the breakfast show on BBC Radio 1, following the departure of Chris Evans from the station. In late 1998, he took over Capital's 4.00 pm – 7.00 pm drivetime show from David Jensen, which was later extended to 8.00 pm.

Fox also presented a show on Channel 5 from 1998 until 2002, and he was a judge on Pop Idol, as well as presenting various other ITV1 shows. On Capital FM, he moved from the weekday evening show to the drivetime show in 1998, again succeeding David Jensen. He deputised for Chris Tarrant on the station's breakfast show on many occasions, especially after Tarrant changed to part-time work in 2003, but was passed over in favour of Johnny Vaughan as Tarrant's successor.

Fox said that he wanted to leave Capital when he did not get the breakfast show, but he initially changed his mind and remained for a while longer. On 30 May 2004, he presented his last hit40uk after 11 years, but remained on Capital FM until the spring of 2005 when he left the station after 18 years, his drivetime show being taken over by Richard Bacon.

==== Magic 105.4 ====
From 12 September 2005, he was the presenter of the "More Music Breakfast Show" on Magic 105.4 FM in London, and on DAB, Freeview and Satellite across the UK. His last show was on 30 September 2014, after which he was arrested on the studio's premises. Although ultimately acquitted in December 2015, Fox's contract expired in January 2016 and he did not return to Magic.

==== Thames Radio and Nation Radio UK ====
On 26 June 2016, six months after his acquittal, it was announced Fox would join the new London radio station Thames Radio, where he presented the Saturday morning show. He would later take on the station's breakfast show; however, the venture was short lived, when the station opted for non-stop music in July 2017. On 17 July 2020, it was announced Fox would join the internet radio station United DJs, presenting the "Heritage Chart Run Down" on Sunday evenings. In November 2020, Fox alongside Mike Read left United DJs in order to launch Nation Radio UK. Between January and April 2021, Fox hosted Drivetime and The Heritage Chart on Nation UK. He took over the breakfast show in April 2021, following the departure of Read. In addition to the breakfast show, Fox also took over the "Nation Network Chart Show" on Sundays from 4.00 to 7.00 pm.

As of 2025, Fox continues to host the "Nation Network Chart Show" on Sundays but has since left the breakfast show. He now hosts the afternoon show on Nation 90s, and the drivetime show on Nation Radio London.

==== Awards ====
Fox holds ten Sony awards and was awarded the Gold award for lifetime achievement in 2009, as well as winning the "Best Disc Jockey" award at the Smash Hits Poll Winners Party multiple times.

=== Television ===
On 12 October 2008, Fox joined his fellow ex-Pop Idol judges Pete Waterman and Nicki Chapman on Peter Kay's Britain's Got the Pop Factor... and Possibly a New Celebrity Jesus Christ Soapstar Superstar Strictly on Ice, a spoof on the talent show genre of programmes.

Fox appeared on the satirical show Brass Eye's controversial "Paedogeddon" special, in which he claimed that "Genetically, paedophiles have more genes in common with crabs than they do with you and me. Now that is scientific fact... there's no real evidence for it, but it is scientific fact."

Other television work and appearances include Doctor Fox's Video Jukebox on LWT, Ice Warriors (voiceover) and The Big Call (host) on ITV, and Not the Jack Docherty Show (host) on Channel 5.

He appeared on Paul O'Grady: For the Love of Dogs, in which he received his puppy Bonzo.

On 2 April 2014, Fox appeared on an episode of Big Star's Little Star with his daughter Martha.

In December 2022, he covered some of the Christmas-period shows on GB News for Mark Dolan and Dan Wootton.

== Personal life ==
=== Views ===
In August 2014, Fox was one of 200 public figures who were signatories to a letter to The Guardian opposing Scottish independence in the run-up to September's referendum on that issue.

=== Arrest and trial ===
Fox was arrested on 30 September 2014 at Magic FM headquarters in London by police investigating claims of historical sex offences. The arrest came after separate allegations were made by two women. His arrest was not part of the high-profile sex crime investigation Operation Yewtree, which was set up in the wake of revelations about BBC presenter Jimmy Savile. Fox's homes in Fulham and Littlehampton, West Sussex, were searched. He was subsequently released on bail until December 2014, when he was re-arrested in relation to three other alleged incidents; he was again bailed until March 2015. On 13 March, he was arrested for an alleged sexual offence against a woman in the early 1990s. He remained on bail until late March, when he was then charged with nine sex offences against six people, of whom three were under the age of 16. The offences allegedly occurred between 1991 and 2014. He entered pleas of not guilty at Westminster Magistrates' Court on 16 April 2015. He pleaded not guilty to six additional charges from 1987 and 1988 involving three girls under the age of 16 on 2 October.

His trial began on 5 November 2015. Prosecutors cleared him of five charges before the start of the trial. The bench trial took place at Westminster Magistrates' Court. He was found not guilty on all charges on 14 December. Fox's trial was the first high-profile sexual abuse case to be decided by magistrates, rather than a jury, since the Savile scandal. In summary, Judge Howard Riddle stated: "We heard evidence of about 10 allegations from six women. We believed each of the complainants. The question we must ask is whether we are sure of the facts alleged, sure of the context in which they occurred and sure that they amount to criminal offences." Judge Riddle spoke of the difficulty in dealing with the historic cases, stating they were not sure whether the incidents occurred as described or whether they amounted to criminal offences, and was not sure whether the most recent allegation was a criminal offence. In a statement to the media following his acquittal, Fox stated: "This case has once again raised concerns about how high-profile cases such as this have been investigated by the CPS". He then thanked supporters and expressed his interest in returning to broadcasting.

== Discography ==
- Mix'o'matic (1996)

The album Mix'o'matic is a remix album, containing 50 songs over two discs mixed together by Fox.
