= Reggie Yates =

British actor and media personality (born 1983)

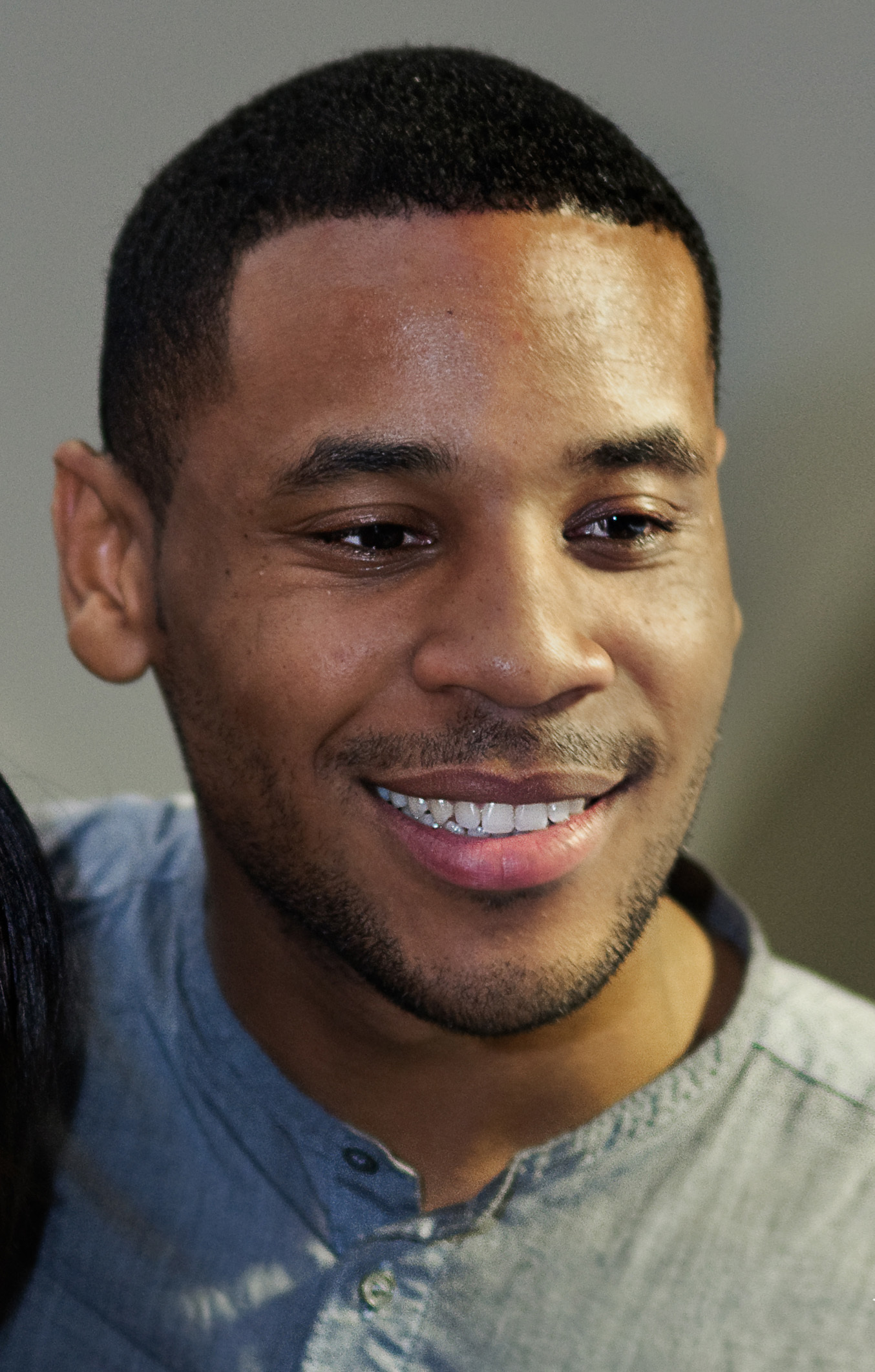
- Yates in 2009
- Born: Reginald Yates; 31 May 1983 (age 43); London, England
- Occupations: Writer, director, documentary filmmaker, actor, television presenter, DJ
- Television: Presenting: Top of the Pops (2004–2016); Only in America (2005); The Voice UK (2012–2013); Release the Hounds (2013–2017); Prized Apart (2015); Special Forces: Ultimate Hell Week (2017); Reggie Yates: Extreme... (2017)
- Website: reggieyates.com

Reginald Yates (born 31 May 1983) is a British television presenter, actor, writer and director with a career spanning three decades on screen as an actor, television presenter and radio DJ. Yates played Leo Jones in Doctor Who and has worked at the BBC in radio and television–presenting various shows for BBC Radio 1 for a decade as well as hosting the BBC One singing show The Voice UK, hosting the first two series with Holly Willoughby.

Yates co-presented the prime-time BBC One game show Prized Apart, alongside Emma Willis, the ITV2 reality show Release the Hounds from 2013 until 2017 and was also the presenter of the BBC Three documentary series Reggie Yates' Extreme Russia, Extreme South Africa and Extreme UK as well as featuring as lead voice actor for the CBeebies animated cartoon series Rastamouse.

In 2021, Yates released his first feature film as writer/director, Pirates.

== Early life ==
Yates' parents, Felicia Asante and Reginald "Jojo" Yates, were both born in Ghana; however, his paternal grandfather Harry was the son of an English accountant, George Yates, who worked in the gold mining industry. Harry Yates' mother Dorothy was also a member of Ghana's Euro-African community: her father was a British colonial administrator, Augustus George Lloyd, while her mother Sarah was an ethnic Fante, who worked as a farmer and trader in Dixcove, Ghana.

Yates grew up in North London, where he attended Central Foundation Boys' School in Cowper Street, Islington.

== Career ==
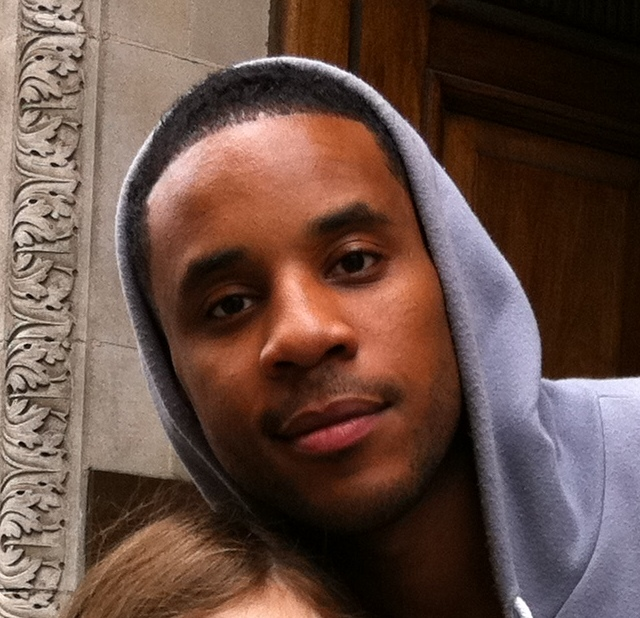
Yates in August 2011

Yates made his first television appearance in Desmond's at the age of eight. He also appeared in Disney Club, as Robbie. In 1998, Yates appeared as a guest presenter on Diggit on CITV also under the name Robbie. In 2002, he played Carl Fenton in the popular children's series Grange Hill. From 2002 to 2004, he presented the Sunday morning programme Smile, and then went on to present Top of the Pops with former Smile co-host Fearne Cotton before the final episode broadcast on BBC Two on 30 July 2006. He also created and starred in the series The Crust and presented Dance Factory and his own radio show on BBC Radio 1.

In 2005, Yates appeared in the BBC singing contest Comic Relief Does Fame Academy in aid of Comic Relief, finishing in fourth place. On the show, his songs included "Boombastic", "You're The First, The Last, My Everything", "It Ain't Over Til It's Over", "U Can't Touch This" and "This Old Heart of Mine (Is Weak for You)". He also sang a duet, "It Takes Two", with Edith Bowman, the eventual winner of the show. He dyed his hair red for his performance of "Dancing on the Ceiling".

On 10 March 2006, Yates appeared on Stars in Fast Cars and won his heat to get into the final, beating Elton Welsby and Ben Fogle in the last round.

Yates presented Mighty Truck of Stuff and Only in America with Fearne Cotton on CBBC as well as a programme on BBC Radio 1. They presented a breakfast show on Saturday and Sunday mornings, taking over from JK and Joel. They played from 7:00 a.m. to 10:00 am. The duo then went on to present The Radio 1 Chart Show starting on 14 October 2007 until Sunday 20 September 2009. Cotton left following her promotion to weekday mornings on Radio 1 from 10:00 a.m. to 12:45 pm, leaving Yates to present on his own.

In addition to the chart show, Yates also presented a request show on Saturday afternoons, known as The Radio 1 Request Show, where listeners could send in a text or phone in to request a song. In April 2012, it was announced that Yates would finish the request show and continue with only The Official Chart. He announced in November 2012 that he would leave BBC Radio 1, and his last show aired on 23 December that year.

In 2006, Yates appeared on a Reality TV Special of The Weakest Link and was voted off in the fourth round.

In 2007, Yates appeared in the third series of revived science-fiction series Doctor Who as Leo Jones, brother of the Tenth Doctor's companion Martha.

Yates also presented series 1 of Escape from Scorpion Island with co-presenter Caroline Flack on BBC 1 between 3 and 21 September 2007.

He also appeared on Dizzee Rascal's 2007 single "Flex" music video as one of the judges in a parody TV show called "Flex Factor".

Yates co-hosted the MOBO Awards 2009 with Keri Hilson at the SECC, Glasgow. He has also presented live coverage of the Glastonbury, Reading and T in the Park music festivals for BBC Three, and interviewed stars such as Estelle and 50 Cent for MTV specials. Yates made a cameo appearance in Jack Osbourne's Celebrity Adrenaline Junkie.

Yates appeared in a special Family Guy episode on BBC Three, counting down the top 20 characters of the show as part of a special Family Guy weekend.

In 2011, Yates voiced the main character, Rastamouse, in the CBeebies television show Rastamouse. In March 2011, he appeared with Lenny Henry, Angela Rippon, and Samantha Womack in the BBC fundraising documentary for Comic Relief called Rich, Famous and in the Slums, where the four celebrities were sent to Kibera in Kenya, Africa's largest slum. In October 2011, Yates starred in Arjun Rose's UK slasher Demons Never Die as Officer Mason.

In 2012, as part of BBC Three's Criminal Britain Season, Yates explored the culture of fear, anger and violence that drives the dangerous world of teen gangs. The show, Reggie Yates: Teen Gangs, involved him speaking to current and former gang members to find out why and how teens get into gangs.

In 2012 and 2013, Yates hosted the BBC One singing show The Voice UK, hosting the first two series with Holly Willoughby. They were replaced by Emma Willis and Marvin Humes in 2013.

2013 saw Yates travel to South Africa to shoot a series, Reggie Yates' Extreme South Africa: White Slums, which aired in Spring 2014 on BBC Three. It was successful enough for Yates to return with Reggie Yates' Extreme Russia in April 2015 for BBC Three.

In 2013, his first short film Patriarch aired on Channel 4 as part of their "Random Acts" season and he has just completed his second short called Date Night, starring Daniel Kaluuya and Tony Way, which won "Best UK Short Film" at the London Independent Film Festival. Yates hosted the ITV2 programme Release the Hounds from 2013 until 2017. He was replaced by Matt Edmondson in 2017.

Yates appeared in an episode of Who Do You Think You Are?, first aired on 25 September 2014, for which he travelled to Ghana to trace his family history.

Yates, along with Emma Willis presented the Saturday-night game show Prized Apart on BBC One in 2015. The show was axed shortly after.

In 2016, Yates was awarded Best Presenter for his critically acclaimed series Extreme Russia at the Royal Television Society Awards and Best Multi-channel Programme at the Broadcast Awards.

Continuing his documentarian journey, in 2016 Yates's BBC Three series The Insider saw the presenter spend time behind bars in Texas and join Unit 27 of the 56th Infantry Battalion in Acapulco to live the life of an ordinary soldier fighting on the front line of the brutal war against the country's powerful and violent drug cartels.

In 2018, Yates was the themed category judge for Koestler Trust's I'm Still Here at the Southbank Centre, London, an exhibition of art works by prisoners, detainees and ex-offenders. The theme was 'connections'. Yates has also been listed in the Powerlist, as one of the most influential people in the UK from African/African-Caribbean descent, most recently making the 2019, 2020 and 2021 editions.

In 2020, Yates' television film Make Me Famous premiered on BBC Three.

In 2021, Yates's debut directorial feature film, Pirates, was released. The film, a comedy-drama set in 1990s London, received largely favourable reviews from critics.

=== Controversies ===
In 2017, the BBC was forced to apologise for a Yates (and independent production company, Sundog Pictures) piece on Australia's Indigenous communities called Hidden Australia: Black in the Outback, filmed in Wilcannia, New South Wales. The Aboriginal people Yates interviewed and filmed for the documentary said they were misled by Yates and the production crew. They accused Yates of portraying them in a negative light, after Yates had promised them the story would be fair.

In November 2017, Yates stated on a podcast: "The thing that makes it great about this new generation of artists is that they ain't signing to majors. They're independent, they're not managed by some random fat Jewish guy from north west London, they're managed by their brethren". His remarks were condemned by the Community Security Trust's Dave Rich who said: "Even worse than any offence is the message Yates gives his audience by reinforcing an anti-Semitic stereotype". Yates was "hugely apologetic" for his comment. Following his comments, he stood down from presenting the 2017 festive special editions of Top of the Pops.

In 2019, when filming for his MTV television series Reggie Yates vs The World in Derry, Northern Ireland, it was claimed that tensions on the street were stoked by dissident Republicans "for the benefit of the film crew", resulting in a riot during which Lyra McKee was murdered. Detective Superintendent Jason Murphy of the Police Service of Northern Ireland said that those claims were untrue.

== Filmography ==
=== Television ===
- Top of the Pops (BBC One; 2004–2016) – Co-presenter, with Fearne Cotton
- Mighty Truck of Stuff (CBBC Channel; 2005) – Presenter
- Only in America (CBBC Channel; 2005) – Co-presenter, with Fearne Cotton
- Dance Factory
- Beckham's Hotshots
- Smile (BBC Two)
- Bring It On (BBC One)
- UGetMe (CBBC & BBC One)
- Trevor Nelson's Lowdown (BBC Three)
- The Big C Concert (BBC)
- Blue Peter Jubilee Special (BBC)
- Kids Passport to London (Miramax)
- Disney Club
- Diggit, RoadHog (Buena Vista)
- Get 100 (BBC Two; 2007)
- Escape from Scorpion Island (CBBC Channel; 2007) – Co-presenter, with Caroline Flack
- The Almost Perfect Guide to Life (BBC Switch)
- MTV Base Backstage EMA 2007 (MTV Base)
- MOBO Awards (BBC; 2009)
- School for Stars (CBBC) – Narrator
- Autistic Superstars 2010 (BBC Three)
- Frankenstein's Wedding... Live in Leeds (BBC Three)
- Reggie Yates: Teen Gangs (BBC Three) – Presenter
- This is Justin Bieber (ITV; 2011) – Presenter
- The Voice UK (BBC One; 2012–2013) – Co-presenter, with Holly Willoughby
- Unity: A Concert for Stephen Lawrence (BBC One)
- Release the Hounds (ITV2; 2013–2017) – Presenter
- Who Do You Think You Are? (BBC One; 2014) – Subject
- Reggie Yates: Extreme South Africa (BBC Three) – Presenter
- Reggie & Thunderbirds: No Strings Attached (ITV2; 2015) – Presenter
- Thunderbirds Are Go – Ellis the Security Guard (voice)
- Reggie Yates: Extreme Russia (BBC Three; 2015–) – Presenter
- Prized Apart (BBC One; 2015) – Co-presenter, with Emma Willis
- Reggie Yates: Race Riots USA – Presenter
- Reggie Yates Extreme Countries (BBC Three; 2015–) – Presenter
- Reggie Yates: The Insider (BBC Three; 2016–) – Presenter
- Special Forces: Ultimate Hell Week (BBC Two; series 2, 2017–) – Presenter
- Reggie in China (BBC Two; series 1, 2019) – Presenter
- Reggie Yates vs The World (MTV; unbroadcast but filmed in 2019) - Presenter

=== Radio ===
- Fearne & Reggie (BBC Radio 1)
- The Trevor Nelson Show (BBC Radio 1)
- Reg & Dev (BBC Radio 1Xtra)
- Smile Radio (Smile Website)
- The UK Top 40 (Formally known as Radio 1's Chart Show) (BBC Radio 1)
- The Fearne & Reggie Saturday request show (BBC Radio 1)
- The Request Show with Reggie Yates (BBC Radio 1)
- The Official Chart with Reggie Yates (BBC Radio 1)

=== Television acting ===
- Thunderbirds Are Go (ITV)
- The Crust (Archie)
- UGetMe (Calvin)
- Grange Hill (BBC)
- The Bill (ITV)
- Priest (Screen Two)
- Family Affairs (Five)
- I Bring You Frankincense (Crucial Films)
- Ghostbusters of East Finchley (BBC)
- Agent Z and the Penguin from Mars (Jenks) (BBC)
- Focus (Harrison) (BBC Schools)
- Pirates (Child's Play)
- Children's Society (Breechhurst)
- Between the Lines (BBC)
- Desmond's (Humphrey Barclay)
- Promotional Advert (Trouble TV)
- Stars in Fast Cars (BBC)
- Doctor Who (BBC) (as Leo Jones)
- Trinity (ITV2)
- Rastamouse(CBeebies)
- Playhouse Presents – Episode: "The Pavement Psychologist" (Sky Arts), Series 2 2013 (as Tommy)
- Release the Hounds (ITV) 2013–2017
- Reggie Yates: Outside Man (Netflix) 2017

=== Writing and directing ===
- Patriarch (2013). Cast was just three performers: Trevor Laird, Ansu Kabia and Kareem Onyiukah.
- Date Night (2014) – Won Best UK Short Film at the London Independent Film Festival
- Shelter (2015)
- Roadkill (2016)
- Make Me Famous (2020)
- Pirates (2021)

== Awards ==
=== National Television Awards ===
| Year | Category | Show | Result |
|---|---|---|---|
| 2017 | TV Presenter | Extreme Russia | Nominated |
| 2017 | Factual Entertainment | Reggie Yates: The Insider, BBC Three | Nominated |

=== Royal Television Society Television Awards ===
| Year | Category | Show | Result |
|---|---|---|---|
| 2016 | Best Presenter | Extreme Russia | Won |
| 2016 | Documentary Series | Extreme Russia | Nominated |
| 2016 | Entertainment | Release the Hounds | Won |
| 2011 | Best Presenter | Autistic Superstars | Nominated |

=== Broadcast Awards ===
| Year | Category | Show | Result |
|---|---|---|---|
| 2016 | Best multi-channel programme | Extreme Russia | Won |

=== Broadcast Digital Awards ===
| Year | Category | Show | Result |
|---|---|---|---|
| 2016 | Best Popular Factual Programme | Extreme Russia | Nominated |
| 2016 | Best Entertainment Programme | Release the Hounds | Nominated |

=== Edinburgh TV Awards ===
| Year | Category | Show | Result |
|---|---|---|---|
| 2016 | Best Factual Programme | Extreme Russia | Won |

=== Attitude Pride Awards ===
| Year | Category | Show | Result |
|---|---|---|---|
| 2015 | Attitude Ally Award | Reggie Yates for Extreme Russia | Won |

=== London Independent Film Awards ===
| Year | Category | Show | Result |
|---|---|---|---|
| 2014 | Festival Prize, Best Short Film UK Feature | Date Night | Won |

=== Children's BAFTA Awards ===
| Year | Category | Show | Result |
|---|---|---|---|
| 2003 | Presenter | Reggie Yates: Smile | Nominated |

Media offices
| Preceded by JK and Joel | BBC Radio 1 chart show presenter (with Fearne Cotton); 14 October 2007 – 20 September 2009 | Succeeded by himself |
| Preceded by Fearne Cotton and himself | BBC Radio 1 chart show presenter 27 September 2009 – 23 December 2012 | Succeeded by Jameela Jamil |
