= Fearne Cotton =

English television and radio presenter (born 1981)

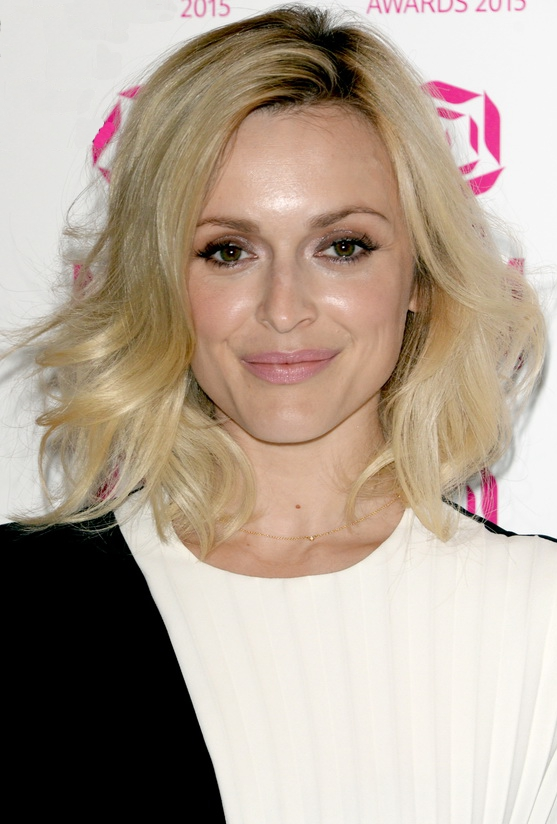
- Cotton in 2014
- Born: 3 September 1981 (age 45); Northwood, London, England
- Other name: Fearne Wood
- Education: Haydon School
- Occupations: Broadcaster; author
- Years active: 1996–present
- Spouse: Jesse Wood (m. 2014; sep. 2024)
- Children: 2
- Relatives: Billy Cotton (great-granduncle); Sir Bill Cotton, CBE (first cousin, twice removed)
- Website: officialfearnecotton.com

Fearne Cotton (born 3 September 1981) is an English broadcaster and author. She began her career in the late 1990s as a children’s television presenter for GMTV, CITV and CBBC. She went on to present various television shows, including Top of the Pops (2004–2020), Love Island (2006), The Xtra Factor (2007), and Interior Design Masters (2019). Cotton was a regular co-presenter of the Children in Need annual telethons from 2005 to 2015, with the exception of 2009. From 2008 to 2018, she was a team captain on the ITV2 comedy panel show Celebrity Juice.

In 2007, Cotton became the first regular female presenter of the Radio 1 Chart Show, which she co-presented with Reggie Yates for two years. She was later given her own Radio 1 show, airing every weekday morning from 2009 to 2015. She joined BBC Radio 2 in 2016.

In 2018, Cotton began presenting Happy Place, a podcast focusing on wellbeing and mental health. She has also released eight self-help books, two children's books, and four books on healthy eating.

== Early life ==
Cotton was born in Northwood, London Borough of Hillingdon, to Mick and Lyn Cotton; she has a younger brother, Jamie Cotton. Her father was a signwriter for events such as Live Aid, and her mother worked in alternative therapy. She grew up in nearby Eastcote, and was educated at Haydon School. She is vegan; she says she is an animal lover. She has participated in several half marathons for charity.

Former BBC executive Bill Cotton (1928–2008) was her paternal grandfather's cousin. He was the son of the well-known entertainer and band leader Billy Cotton. In August 2017, Cotton's ancestry was explored in the BBC TV series Who Do You Think You Are?

Cotton studied art at A-level, a skill she used whilst presenting the series Draw Your Own Toons.

== Television ==
=== Children's ===
Cotton began her presenting career in 1996, at the age of 15, with early-morning GMTV children's programme The Disney Club, after winning a competition for young talent to present the show. Cotton later continued with the show and with its replacement Diggit. She left in 2000, to concentrate on her other projects with CITV, including Draw Your Own Toons and Mouse, aimed at encouraging children to use computers.

Cotton joined CBBC in 2001 to present children's science programme Eureka TV. From 2001 until 2003, she presented Finger Tips, an arts and crafts programme for children, which she co-presented with Stephen Mulhern. She later co-presented on CBBC's Sunday morning show, Smile and on The Saturday Show. She has also made appearances in the CBBC show Only in America, alongside her good friend and fellow presenter Reggie Yates. Cotton returned to children's television in 2015 by voicing one of the Voice Trumpets in the reboot of the classic British children's television series Teletubbies.

=== ITV ===
In 2006, Cotton presented the second series of ITV's Love Island with Patrick Kielty.

In 2007, she took over from Ben Shephard as host of The X Factor spin-off programme The Xtra Factor on ITV2, presenting the programme for one series before resigning to work in America; she was replaced in the following series by Holly Willoughby.

Starting on 5 September 2007, Cotton co-hosted with Holly Willoughby the ITV2 dating programme Holly & Fearne Go Dating, which saw the pair try to find dates for lonely singletons.

Beginning in 2008, Cotton appeared as a team captain on the ITV2 comedy panel show Celebrity Juice alongside host Keith Lemon and fellow team captain Holly Willoughby. Cotton took a short break from the programme in 2013 whilst on maternity leave, and Kelly Brook stood in for her during the ninth series. She quit the series in 2018.

Cotton has also presented the Isle of Wight Festival 2009 on ITV2 alongside Rufus Hound.

Since 2009, Cotton has hosted Fearne and... on ITV2. In 2012, Cotton hosted The Nation's Favourite Number One Single, a three-part series, revealing Britain's Favourite No. 1 single. Since 2016, Cotton has co-presented Fearne & Gok: Off The Rails, alongside Gok Wan for ITVBe. In March 2017, Cotton guest presented five episodes of ITV Breakfast's Lorraine programme.

=== BBC ===
In 2003, Cotton moved over to mainstream broadcasting. She along with Simon Grant (her co-presenter from The Saturday Show) presented the spin-off show Top of the Pops: Saturday (later renamed Top of the Pops: Reloaded) that year. In 2004, she moved up to work alongside Reggie Yates on the main programme, Top of the Pops (the then flagship chartshow for the BBC) becoming one of the last regular presenters for that programme, which ended in July 2006. Due to other commitments, she was unable to present the final show itself, appearing instead in a short film shown at the head of that show, in which she made her personal farewells. Cotton and Yates presented the one-off Christmas and New Year specials in both 2008 and 2009, as well as the Comic Relief special in 2009.

She has hosted parts of the Red Nose Day telethon for Comic Relief (2005, 2007, 2009 and 2011) presenting several strands alongside Jonathan Ross and Lenny Henry.

Cotton has also presented many charity telethons for both Comic Relief and Children in Need on BBC One and BBC Two. In July 2005 she co-presented the BBC's coverage of Live 8 in Hyde Park. During the event, British pop star and former Take That member Robbie Williams flirted with her in front of the cameras, causing much speculation in the media at the time, which was later repudiated by the pair. In 2008, she hosted a Strictly Come Dancing special as part of Children in Need.

In June 2012, Cotton was one of the BBC's presenters for its coverage of the Thames Diamond Jubilee Pageant. Following more than 4,000 complaints made about the BBC's coverage of the Diamond Jubilee in 2012 and in particular criticism of Cotton's role, she responded on Twitter by stating, "Grown men who slag me off in articles/online are huge bullies. I love my job and wouldn't be doing it if I wasn't any good at it."

Cotton guest presented The One Show on BBC One for two nights in November 2013, two nights in February 2014, one night in March 2014 and one night in March 2016.

=== Other channels ===
She also presented the Friday night live eviction programme that year for the Channel 5 reality television series Make Me a Supermodel.

Cotton hosted Sky One's talent search Must Be The Music for one series in 2010.

=== Commercials ===
Cotton is the voice over of the Tesco Mobile adverts since late 2020. She also became the voice over of the On the Beach radio adverts in 2022.

=== United States ===
In February 2008, Cotton moved to the US to host one-off special Guinness World Records Live: Top 100. Cotton later co-hosted the NBC reality show Last Comic Standing.

=== Eurovision Song Contest ===
Cotton has presented parts of the BBC's coverage of the Eurovision Song Contest.

On 20 May 2006, she read the United Kingdom's votes at the Eurovision Song Contest 2006, held in Athens, Greece.

On 17 March 2007, she, along with Terry Wogan, hosted Making Your Mind Up 2007, the show to decide which song the UK sent to the Eurovision Song Contest 2007 in Helsinki, Finland. On the night, after the final "sing-off" between the two remaining acts, Wogan and Cotton simultaneously announced different winners. Since Wogan was the more experienced presenter, it was assumed that he was right. In fact, Wogan had accidentally announced the wrong artist, Cyndi, as the winner. Cotton had to persist in repeating the correct name until the confusion was resolved. The group Scooch was quickly proclaimed as the correct winner, but came only second-to-last in the main competition. Cotton also presented the United Kingdom's votes at the show itself, held in Helsinki, Finland, on 12 May 2007.

== Radio ==
=== BBC Radio 1 ===
In September 2005, she joined BBC Radio 1 to present the Friday early morning slot with Reggie Yates, with whom she had previously worked on CBBC, Only in America and Top of the Pops. Since 14 October 2007, Cotton and Yates presented BBC Radio 1's Chart Show, taking over from Jason King and Joel Ross, who had left the station. Cotton then became the first ever permanent female presenter of a BBC radio chart show. (Jo Whiley had preceded her as the first female presenter of The Official UK Top 40, as it was then called, but presented it only once, on 24 November 2002.)

On 16 July 2009, it was announced that Cotton would become the new presenter of BBC Radio 1's weekday mid-morning show, taking over from Jo Whiley (who moved to weekends). Her new programme began on 21 September 2009.

On 27 February 2015, she announced that she was pregnant with her second child and that she would be leaving BBC Radio 1. Clara Amfo replaced Cotton on 25 May 2015, taking over the mid-morning show. Cotton's final show was broadcast on 22 May 2015.

=== BBC Radio 2 ===
Cotton joined BBC Radio 2 in July 2016 standing in for Graham Norton with former Spandau Ballet bassist Martin Kemp on Saturday mornings (10 am–1 pm) while Norton took his annual summer break. Fearne covered for Ken Bruce 24–28 October 2016, in 2017 on 13–17 February, 3–7 and 10–14 April, 11 May, 29 May–2 June and 23–27 October, and in 2018 on 14–16 February. Fearne has also covered for Chris Evans on the Breakfast Show from 9–13 April 2018. In late 2018, Cotton sat in for Claudia Winkleman on Sundays.

In 2019, Cotton was the cover host for Zoe Ball during the holidays. On 19 March 2020 Cotton launched BBC Radio 2's fourth music decades show, Sounds of the 90s.

== Other work ==
In August 2017, Cotton collaborated with Mini Club, a children's clothing company that sells through Boots stores and their website, to produce her own clothing range. She publicised the range across her various social media accounts, posting pictures of herself and her daughter wearing lines from the collection. She also has clothing and homeware ranges with online retailer Very.

In 2018, Cotton began presenting Happy Place, a podcast available to streaming platforms. The podcast features Cotton interviewing various celebrities.

== Personal life ==
Cotton said on Friday Night with Jonathan Ross that she has eleven tattoos, the most notable of which is a fern leaf, covering her right hip up to her rib cage. She lived at Chestnut Cottage, Petersham, Richmond-upon-Thames, from 2004 to 2008.

Cotton dated Ian Watkins, lead singer and frontman of the rock band Lostprophets, in 2005. She was married to Jesse Wood, the son of Rolling Stones guitarist Ronnie Wood. She has a son and a daughter with Wood, born in 2013 and 2015. On 13 December 2024, Cotton announced she and Wood were separating. Cotton lives in Richmond, London. Cotton is a friend of fellow TV presenter Holly Willoughby, with whom she has co-presented several shows. Cotton and Sarah Cawood acted as two of the bridesmaids at Willoughby's wedding to Dan Baldwin on 4 August 2007.

Cotton is a pescatarian. She authored a vegan cookbook in 2019, though she did not follow a vegan diet at the time.

In December 2024 she announced that she had undergone surgery to remove two benign jaw tumours.

=== Charity ===
In 2009, Cotton climbed Mount Kilimanjaro, alongside Ben Shephard, Gary Barlow, Alesha Dixon, Ronan Keating, Denise Van Outen and Chris Moyles, and Girls Aloud members Cheryl Cole and Kimberley Walsh. Cotton and others collapsed from altitude sickness during the five-day climb. She was in the first group (with Van Outen, Shephard and Cole) to reach the summit and helped raise £3.3m. Cotton filmed a video piece for Comic Relief about malaria. She visited a children's hospital in Uganda.

Cotton also recorded her voice for the BT Speaking Clock to raise funds for Comic Relief.

== Filmography ==
=== Television ===
Year	Title	Role	Notes
1996	The Disney Club	Presenter	
1998	Mouse	Presenter	
1998–2001	Draw Your Own Toons	Presenter	
1998–2001	Diggit	Presenter	
1999–2000	Pump It Up	Co-presenter	With Andy Collins
2001	Petswap	Co-presenter	With Dave Benson Phillips
2001	Record Breakers	Presenter	
2001	Eureka TV	Presenter	
2001–2003	Finger Tips	Co-presenter	With Stephen Mulhern
2002	Top of the Pops Saturday	Co-presenter	With Simon Grant
2002	CBBC Prom in the Park	Presenter	TV special
2002–2003	The Saturday Show	Presenter	
2002–2004	Smile	Presenter	
2003	Antiques Roadshow	Guest Presenter	1 episode
2003–2005	Top of the Pops Reloaded	Presenter	
2003–2007	Serious	Narrator	
2004	EastEnders Revealed	Narrator	
2004–2020	Top of the Pops	Co-presenter	With Reggie Yates
2005	Live 8	Co-presenter	With Jonathan Ross, Jo Whiley and Graham Norton
2005	Only in America	Co-presenter	With Reggie Yates
2005	Byker Grove	Herself	1 episode
2005–2015	Children in Need	Co-presenter	
2005–2018	Britain's Next Top Model	Narrator	
2006	Love Island	Co-presenter	With Patrick Kielty
2006	All Star Family Fortunes	Herself	Team captain, 1 episode
2006	Make Me a Supermodel	Presenter	
2006, 2016, 2020	Ant & Dec's Saturday Night Takeaway	Herself / Guest Announcer	3 episodes
2007	The Xtra Factor	Presenter	
2007	Making Your Mind Up	Co-presenter	With Terry Wogan
2007	Holly & Fearne Go Dating	Herself	Co-star with Holly Willoughby
2007, 2009, 2011	Comic Relief	Co-presenter	
2008	Coleen's Real Women	Narrator	8 episodes
2008	Guilty Pleasures	Presenter	TV special
2008	Everybody Dance Now!	Presenter	TV special
2008	Guinness World Records Smashed	Presenter	
2008	Last Comic Standing	Co-presenter	Season 6 with Bill Bellamy
2008–2010	Greek Uncovered	Narrator	
2008–2018	Celebrity Juice	Panellist	Team captain
2009	The Truth About…	Presenter	Documentary
2009–2010, 2014	Fearne and....	Presenter	
2009–2017	Children in Need Rocks	Presenter	
2010	Must Be The Music	Presenter	
2011	The Royal Wedding	Presenter	TV special
2012	The Nation's Favourite Number 1 Hit Single	Narrator	3 episodes
2012	Unzipped	Herself	2 episodes
2012	Lemon La Vida Loca	Herself	2 episodes
2013, 2014, 2016	The One Show	Guest Presenter	3 episodes
2014	Sweat the Small Stuff	Panellist	3 episodes
2014, 2016	Through the Keyhole	Panellist	2 episodes
2015	The Keith Lemon Sketch Show	Herself	4 episodes
2015–2018	Teletubbies	Voice Trumpet	Voice role
2016	Fearne & Gok: Off The Rails	Co-presenter	With Gok Wan
2016	Jamie & Jimmy's Friday Night Feast	Herself	1 episode
2017	Lorraine	Guest Presenter	3 episodes
2017	Who Do You Think You Are?	Herself	1 episode
2019	Interior Design Masters	Presenter	
2020	Portrait Artist of the Year	Herself	1 episode
2022–	Celebrity Gogglebox	Herself	

=== Film ===
Year	Title	Role	Notes
2012	Keith Lemon: The Film	Herself	Cameo

== Bibliography ==
=== Non-fiction ===
- The Best Friends' Guide to Life (14 October 2010) – with Holly Willoughby
- Cook Happy, Cook Healthy (2 June 2016)
- Happy: Finding joy in every day and letting go of perfect (9 February 2017)
- Yoga Babies (31 May 2017)
- Cook. Eat. Love (1 June 2017)
- Calm: Working through life's daily stresses to find a peaceful centre (28 December 2017)
- Hungry Babies (6 September 2018)
- Quiet: Silencing The brain chatter and believing you are good enough (13 December 2018)
- Happy Vegan: Easy plant-based recipes to make the whole family happy (3 October 2019)
- Speak your Truth (7 January 2021)
- Bigger Than Us: The power of finding meaning in a messy world (20 January 2022)
- Likeable: How I Broke Free From The Need To Please (12 March 2026)

=== Fiction ===
- Scripted

Media offices
Preceded by JK and Joel	BBC Radio 1 chart show presenter (with Reggie Yates); 14 October 2007 – 20 September 2009	Succeeded by Reggie Yates
