= Jason King (presenter) =

British radio DJ (born 1975)

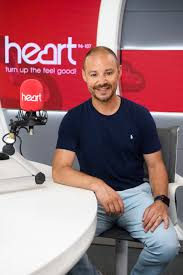
- King in the Heart studios 2019
- Born: Jason Griffiths; 6 January 1975 (age 51); Tenbury Wells, Worcestershire, England, UK
- Other names: JK, Short King
- Occupations: Disc Jockey, Television Presenter
- Employer: Global Radio
- Spouse: Suzanne Shaw (m. 2009; sep. 2012)
- Children: 2

Jason King (also known by his initials JK and Short King, born Jason Griffiths, 6 January 1975) is a British radio DJ and TV presenter of programmes such as Hider in the House and Escape from Scorpion Island with friend and long-time colleague Joel Ross. He currently presents Heart radio's weekday drivetime show from 4 pm to 7 pm, presenting alongside Kelly Brook (and acting as her personal assistant on the side). He also provides holiday cover for weekday breakfast.

== Career ==
=== Early radio career ===
Jason King (Short King), has formerly presented for Sunshine 855 in Ludlow, Galaxy 101 in Bristol and 96.9 Viking FM in Hull, where he met, and was first paired on-air with, Joel Ross.

=== JK and Joel ===
King had become breakfast show host in 1998 after two years on the lunchtime slot, while also hosting a weekend dance music programme called "Club 969". After a year of presenting the breakfast slot alone, he was paired up with Ross (a long-time colleague and socialising partner).

Initially, the arrangement was just for Ross to earn some overtime from his afternoon shift by reading JK's travel reports; but instantly it became clear that the pair had a natural broadcasting rapport as well as great ability to communicate with the audience, and so Ross was relieved of his afternoon duties and elevated to the role of breakfast co-host. Together, they won two Gold Sony Radio Academy Awards for 'Breakfast Show Of The Year' and a Silver for 'Entertainment Show'.

In 2011, JK and Joel were guests on the CBBC show Hacker Time.

This success led to the pair working together on many other projects in radio and television, until going their separate ways in 2013.

=== Other work ===
JK took part in the Channel 4 series "The Games" where he finished third. He recently appeared on "Celebrity Poker", but has since said that he "won't be appearing on any more reality shows as [he has] been on too many". For more information on his career visit the page dedicated to JK and Joel.

JK also took part in Celebrity Total Wipeout and was the eventual winner

From 23 January 2012 he co-presented Heart Breakfast alongside Lucy Horobin on Heart Solent. On 4 August 2012 he began co-presenting Saturday breakfast alongside Horobin across the Heart Network. From 13 until 29 August 2012 he and Horobin presented Heart Breakfast on Heart London, in the absence of Harriet Scott and Jamie Theakston, meaning they were absent from their usual show on Heart Solent. In 2013 JK along with his co-host Lucy moved to Heart London to present weekday drivetime. Since 2019, JK is presenting his radio shows with model & actress Kelly Brook following Horobin's move to Heart Dance.

== Personal life ==
King attended Tenbury High School.

Away from the media spotlight, King is a football fan and an animal lover. A farmer's son, he initially wanted to work for the RSPCA. As a young child he lived on a dairy farm with his family.

King started dating former Hear'Say singer Suzanne Shaw in December 2005, after appearing together on Britain's Worst Celebrity Driver. The couple had been friends since Shaw's Hear'Say days, and lived together with Shaw's son in Yorkshire. They announced their engagement in August 2008, and the couple married on 14 June 2009. On 13 February 2012 it was announced the couple had separated. He is now married to radio DJ Charlie O'Brien who co-presented the weekday breakfast show for Heart Kent with James Hemming. The couple have a son born February 2015 and a daughter born August 2017.
