= Joel Ross (DJ) =

British radio DJ and television presenter (born 1977)

- Ross in 2007
- Born: Joel Hogg; 31 May 1977 (age 49); Scarborough, North Yorkshire, England
- Occupations: Radio DJ, television presenter
- Employer: Bauer Media Audio UK
- Partner: Lily Turner
- Children: 2

Joel Ross (born Joel Hogg 31 May 1977) is a British radio DJ and television presenter. He has worked with a co-host Jason King (known on-air as JK). He presented The Hits Radio 00s Breakfast Show on weekdays until June 2026.

== Career ==
=== Best known for ===
Ross is best known for his work on BBC Radio 1 and hosting BBC TV shows Hider in the House and Escape from Scorpion Island

Ross started out in radio as a presenter on his hometown station Yorkshire Coast Radio in 1993, at the age of 16, presenting the evening show and Nothing But the 90's. He left in late 1995 and went on to present various shows on Minster FM, A1FM, Sun City 103.4, TFM Radio and Metro Radio, as well as being a travel presenter for stations in the North.

=== JK and Joel ===
He joined Viking FM in 1996, starting on the nightshift. He worked his way up to the late show, off-air breakfast producer, evening show host and afternoon show presenter. He was then offered the chance to pair up with JK on the breakfast show, which JK had hosted alone for the previous year.

=== Other work ===
In 2011, Ross became the host of Wrestle Talk TV. Originally a YouTube-based show talking about the recent wrestling action as well as interviews with both WWE and TNA wrestlers. The show debuted on Challenge on 26 August 2012. Ross was fired in March 2014 for making comments on social media which WTTV deemed "unacceptable".

In January 2013, Ross joined Heart West Midlands, presenting local weekend shows. He has also covered for Neil 'Roberto' Williams on the networked evening show and the weekday breakfast show in the West Midlands. He joined Heart North West on 6 May 2014 as the station's breakfast show co-host, alongside Lorna Bancroft.

In 2019, Heart nationalised their Breakfast show which brought an end to Joel and Lorna on Heart North West. Ross became the host of Rock FM's Breakfast Show. In January 2024 Rock FM and Radio City in Liverpool introduced a shared weekday breakfast show, co-hosted by Ross and former Radio City presenter Leanne Campbell from Radio City's studios at St. John's Beacon (until the closure of these studios at the end of 2024, with production moved to Bauer's studio complex in Castlefield, Manchester). In April 2024 Rock FM and Radio City were rebranded under the Hits Radio identity, and in June 2025 local/regional breakfast shows on Hits Radio stations in England were replaced with a nationally syndicated show, ending the 'Leanne and Joel' pairing after a year and a half, Ross moving to host breakfast on national digital station Hits Radio 00s.
