= Are You Smarter than a 10 Year Old? =

Are You Smarter than a 10 Year Old? may refer to:

- Are You Smarter than a 10 Year Old? (British game show)
- Are You Smarter than a 10 Year Old? (New Zealand game show)

== See also ==
- Are You Smarter than a 5th Grader?, game show franchise
