= Are You Smarter than a 5th Grader? =

Game show franchise

- Created by: Mark Burnett, Barry Poznick and John Stevens
- Original work: Are You Smarter than a 5th Grader? (American game show)
- Owner: MGM Television
- Years: 2007–present

Films and television
- Television series: Are You Smarter than a 5th Grader? (see international versions)

Miscellaneous
- Genre: Game show
- First aired: 27 February 2007; 19 years ago

Are You Smarter than a 5th Grader? is a game show franchise that was co-created and produced by Mark Burnett, Barry Poznick and John Stevens. Adult contestants answer questions, as if they came from an elementary grade school quiz. The original American version debuted on the Fox Broadcasting network on February 27, 2007, with host Jeff Foxworthy, airing on Fox until 2009, as a syndicated TV series between 2009 and 2011, and then revived on Fox in 2015, and again on Nickelodeon in 2019, with new host, John Cena. The Are You Smarter than a 5th Grader? format has since been replicated in several other countries, some versions under the same title, and some under modified ones.

In 2013, the show appeared in TV Guide's list of the 60 greatest game shows ever.

== Gameplay ==
Each game is played by a single contestant, who earns money incrementally, based on a payout ladder, by answering simple trivia questions, with the game themed as a school quiz. The following description of the show is based primarily on the American version, of Are You Smarter than a 5th Grader?, though the general format applies to all international versions.

The game relies on the premise that an adult would not know the information generally taught in elementary school because it is rarely used in adult life by the type of person chosen to be a contestant. Therefore, the show is essentially a test to see how much an adult has retained since graduating elementary school. The show also derives its humor by occasionally displaying the contestant's educational attainment, implying that in spite of that, they struggle to answer some questions.

The contestant is presented and chooses from a set of subjects and grade level question topics in any order they like, usually ten in most versions, with one or two subjects for each grade level. Each question is presented as either a multiple choice question of three answers, a true-or-false question, or a short-answered question, in which a contestant must answer it correctly in order to progress on to the next question. Throughout the game, the contestant can choose to walk away, or in this case, "drop out of school," and leave with the current accumulated winnings up to that point. If the contestant gets a question wrong, unless the student has the correct answer via a "Save" (see below), he or she "flunks out" and the contestant leaves the game either with nothing or the amount of money from the last threshold level they passed.

During the game, the contestant also chooses one of the five students from the classroom who will assist the contestant on two questions. The contestant is also presented with two "cheats" and a "save" that may only be used once throughout a game to help them on their way:

- Peek: The contestant is shown their classmate's answer and may use it or give a different one. When this cheat is used, the contestant may not "drop out" on the current question.
- Copy: The contestant is locked into using their classmate's answer without being able to see it first. The classmate must provide the correct answer in order for the contestant to advance to the next question; otherwise, the contestant flunks out. When this cheat is used in the 2015 revival, the classmate is allowed to discuss his or her answer with the other fifth graders and change it if desired.
- Save: If the contestant misses a question and the classmate has answered correctly, the contestant is credited with a correct answer and is allowed to continue in the game. The contestant cannot choose to use this cheat; it is automatically used on their first miss. If the classmate has also missed the question, the contestant flunks out. By using the Peek first, a contestant could have two possible answers to a question—their own, then the classmate's with the Save if needed.

Once all three forms of assistance are used or the tenth question is answered correctly, whichever comes first, the classmates must return to the tables and take no further active role in the game.

Each correct answer moves the contestant up a payout ladder (the question value determines the difficulty, regardless of grade level), and by completing the first set of ten questions, the contestant is shown the subject of a final, bonus question worth the grand prize from the highest primary school grade level (for example, fifth grade in the American version or sixth grade in the 2015 revival) and must then decide to either drop out or attempt the question, at which point dropping out is no longer allowed. A correct answer wins the contestant the grand prize, which varies from country to country. At the end of the game, the contestant must confess to the camera whether they are "smarter than a 5th grader" or not, based on whether or not they have won the grand prize.

=== Other formats ===
The American version also has two different variations of the game, each providing a different gameplay format from the original and offered a lower grand prize due to the variations' budgets.

==== Syndicated version ====
The syndicated version featured a reduced grand prize of $250,000 with a revised game format; unlike the original game format, the contestant must attempt to correctly answer up to ten questions with correct answers earning a certain cash value proportional to the difficulty (first-grade questions are worth the lowest amount, and fifth-grade being the highest). A correct answer earns the contestant the amount it's worth, while an incorrect answer takes their winnings back to zero. The contestant may not "drop out" until they get to the final question, where they choose to leave the game or risk all their winnings to answer one final fifth-grade bonus question; a correct answer multiplies their current winnings by ten while a miss forfeits all of their winnings and they leave instead with nothing or a $2,500 prepaid credit card if they took at least $2,500 to the final question. The cheats are retained from the original version and can still be used until the tenth question. A contestant must answer all eleven questions to win the $250,000.

When the syndicated version was revived for a second season, three changes were made. The main fifth-grade questions are removed, and the only one from that grade was the bonus question. Contestants must start at the first grade and cannot skip a grade. At least one question from each grade must be answered or have used a cheat on, 1 to 3, before they can roam the board freely. The "Save" has been removed.

==== Nickelodeon version ====
The 2019 Nickelodeon version also featured a different game format and a prize of up to $100,000. The format was split into two rounds: in round one, contestants answered six questions from the first four grades (one question from the first two grades, and two from the next two grades), with a possible maximum of $10,000. In round two, the contestant was given 60 seconds to correctly answer as many as five fifth-grade questions; each correct answers increase the multiplier by one; answering all five questions correctly for the round multiplies the round one winnings by ten.

The contestants are still given two cheats to use during the first round; the "Save" is instead replaced with a final cheat (usable on the second round) where the contestant may discuss with the classmate for the answer without a time limit.

== International versions ==
The show has spawned many versions around the world.

Currently airing No longer airing

Country/Region	Name	Host	Channel	Air Date
Albania	Të gjithë për një	Eno Popi	Top Channel	October 2016
Argentina	¿Sabés más que un chico de 5to grado?	Andrea Frigerio and Pablo Granados	América (Channel 2)	July 9, 2007
Australia	Are You Smarter than a 5th Grader?	Rove McManus	Network Ten	September 26, 2007 – October 30, 2009
Austria	Dreizehn	Christian Clerici	ORF1	September 27, 2007
Belgium	Slimmer dan een kind van 10?	Goedele Liekens	VT4	September 6, 2007 – November 2007
Belgium	Êtes-vous plus malin qu'un enfant de primaire ?	Alain Simons	RTL-TVI	September 6, 2007
Brazil	Você é Mais Esperto que um Aluno da Quinta Série?	Silvio Santos	SBT	September 23, 2007 – January 13, 2008
Bulgaria	Това го знае всяко хлапе! Tova go znae vsiako hlape!	Ivan & Andrei (2007–2008); Dimitar & Deo (2008–2009)	bTV	September 15, 2007 – February 20, 2009
Canada (in English)	Are You Smarter than a Canadian 5th Grader?	Colin Mochrie	Global	October 25, 2007 – November 22, 2007
Canada (Quebec)	La classe de 5^{e}	Charles Lafortune	TVA	February 5, 2009 – April 25, 2011
Cambodia	តើអ្នកឆ្លាតជាងក្មេងថ្នាក់ទី៥ឬទេ?	Doung Sokhea	CTN	September 14, 2012
Chile	¿Sabes más que un niño de 5º básico?	José Miguel Viñuela	MEGA	April 2, 2008 – June 10, 2010
China mainland	五年级救助队; Wŭ nián jí jiù zhù duì	Wang Han	HNETV	May 1, 2007
China mainland	幸运52 幸运课堂; Xìng yùn 52 xìng yùn kè táng	Li Yong	CCTV-2	June 1, 2007
China mainland	谁比谁聪明; Shéi bĭ shéi cōng ming	Liu Ming-ming	SZTV	June 1, 2007
China mainland	你能毕业吗? Nĭ néng bì yè ma?	Duan Lei; Jia Ning	TJTV	June 2, 2007
China mainland	不考不知道; Bù kǎo bù zhī dào	Xu Rui	SXTVS	June 30, 2007
China mainland	五年级插班生; Wǔ nián jí chā bān shēng	He Hao-peng	Guangdong TV	August 10, 2007
Colombia	¿Sabes más que un niño de primaria?	Jose Gabriel Ortiz	Caracol TV	February 20, 2008
Czech Republic	Jsi chytřejší než páťák?	Michal Suchánek and Richard Genzer	TV Nova	June 23, 2007
Denmark	Er du klogere end en tiårig?	Jan Gintberg	TV3	September 22, 2007
Estonia	Targem kui 5B	Indrek Tarand	TV3	September 13, 2008
Finland	Fiksumpi kuin koululainen	Nicke Lignell	MTV3	November 6, 2008 – February 22, 2009
France	Êtes-vous plus fort qu’un élève de 10 ans ?	Roland Magdane	M6	September 3, 2007 – November 30, 2007
Germany	Das weiß doch jedes Kind!	Cordula Stratmann	Sat.1	July 6, 2007 – August 22, 2008
Greece	Είσαι πιο έξυπνος από ένα δεκάχρονο Eísai pio éxypnos apó éna dekáchrono	Sophia Aliberti	ANT1	January 19, 2008 – June 2009
Hong Kong	係咪小兒科; Hai Mai Siu Yi Fo	Leo Ku	TVB	October 25, 2008 – November 16, 2009
Hungary	Okosabb vagy mint egy 5-es?	Attila Till	TV2	August 24, 2007
Iceland	Ertu skarpari en skólakrakki?	Gunnar Hansson	Skjár 1	October 21, 2007
India	Kya Aap Paanchvi Pass Se Tez Hain?	Shahrukh Khan	STAR Plus	April 25, 2008 – July 27, 2008
India (Malayalam)	Anchinodu Inchodinchu	Suresh Gopi	Surya TV	August 23, 2021 – present
Indonesia	Are You Smarter than a 5th Grader? Indonesia	Tantowi Yahya; Nico Siahaan; Indy Barends	Global TV	April 11, 2009 – March 6, 2011
Israel	?'האם אתה חכם יותר מתלמיד כיתה ו Ha'im ata hakham metalmid kitah vav?	Eyal Kitzis	Channel 2	July 2007
Italy	Sei più bravo di un ragazzino di 5ª?	Massimiliano Ossini (2008–2010); Riccardo Rossi (2010–2011)	Sky Vivo, Sky Uno cielo	October 6, 2008 – 2011
Japan	クイズ あなたは小学5年生より賢いの? Kuizu anata wa shogaku 5-nensei yori kashikoi no?	Takashi Suzuki	NTV	April 24, 2011
Japan	クイズ あなたは小学5年生より賢いの? Kuizu anata wa shogaku 5-nensei yori kashikoi no?	Gekidan Hitori	NTV	November 11, 2018; May 3, 2019; August 8, 2019
Japan	クイズ あなたは小学5年生より賢いの? Kuizu anata wa shogaku 5-nensei yori kashikoi no?	Gekidan Hitori and Ryuta Sato	NTV	October 18, 2019 – September 27, 2024; January 24, 2025
Latvia	Vai tu esi gudrāks par 5 klasnieku?	Māris Olte	TV3	September 8, 2007
Lithuania	Penktokų iššūkis	Andrius Rožickas	TV3	September 2, 2007
Malaysia	Are You Smarter than a 4th Grader?		TV3	October 1, 2007 – September 30, 2008
Mexico	Todo el mundo cree que sabe	Marco Antonio Regil	Televisa	June 13, 2009 – August 20, 2011
Mongolia	Ta 5-p aнгийн хүүхдээс ухаантай юу?	E. Banzragch	Edutainment TV	January 5, 2013
Myanmar	၅တန်းနဲ့ပြိုင် ဘယ်သူနိုင်	Kaung Htet Zaw	Channel 7	2013
Netherlands	Ben je slimmer dan een kind?	Erik van der Hoff	Net 5	September 2, 2007
New Zealand	Are You Smarter than a 10 Year Old?	Dominic Bowden	TV2	September 9, 2007 – November 25, 2007
Norway	Er du smartere enn en 5. klassing?	Sturla Berg-Johansen	TV2	March 9, 2012
Peru	¿Sabes más que un niño de primaria?	Bruno Pinasco	América Televisión	April 27, 2014
Philippines	Kakasa Ka Ba Sa Grade 5?	Janno Gibbs	GMA Network	October 27, 2007 – May 9, 2009
Poland	Czy jesteś mądrzejszy od 5-klasisty?	Robert Korólczyk (2007–2008); Marzena Rogalska (2008–2009)	TV Puls	October 29, 2007 – June 2009
Portugal	Sabe mais do que um Miúdo de 10 Anos?	Jorge Gabriel	RTP1	September 17, 2007 – August 22, 2008
Romania	Te crezi mai deștept decât un copil de clasa a 5-a?	Virgil Ianțu	Prima TV	2007–2008
Romania	Ești mai deștept decât un copil de clasa a V-a?	Andrei Aradits (2023–2024); Andrei Ștefănescu (2024–2025)	Antena 1	October 27, 2023 – January 17, 2025
Russia	Кто умнее пятиклассника? Kto umneye pyatiklassnika?	Alexandr Pushnoy	STS	December 9, 2007 – July 20, 2008
Serbia	Da li ste pametniji od đaka petaka?	Voja Nedeljković	Fox	September 2007
Slovakia	Ste chytrejší ako piatak?	Peter Marcin	TV Markiza	July 8, 2007
South Africa	Are You Smarter than a 5th Grader?	Soli Philander	M-Net	January 27, 2008
Spain	¿Sabes más que un niño de primaria?	Ramón García	Antena 3	June 28, 2007 – August 18, 2008
Sri Lanka	Punchi Pahe Man	Vijaya Nandasiri	Sirasa TV	2008
Sweden	Smartare än en femteklassare	Lasse Kronér (2011–2017); Josefin Johansson (2018–2020)	SVT1	March 19, 2011 – May 16, 2020
Sweden	Smartare än en femteklassare	Marko Lehtosalo	Kanal 5	September 7, 2023 – present
Taiwan	百萬小學堂; Bǎi wàn xiǎo xuétáng	Chang Hsiao-yen (張小燕) (1st edition); Bowie Tsang (曾寶儀) and Xiaoxia (小蝦) (2nd edition)	TTV	October 3, 2008 – May 3, 2013
Thailand	ถ้าคุณแน่? อย่าแพ้ ป.4!	Kanit Sarasin	Channel 3	October 1, 2007 – October 10, 2008
Thailand	ถ้าคุณแน่? อย่าแพ้ เด็ก (ประถม)!	Kanit Sarasin	Channel 3	October 13, 2008 – April 29, 2010
Turkey	5'e Gidenden Akıllı Mısın?	Tolga Gariboğlu	Star TV	June 2007
Ukraine	Чи розумніший ти за п’ятикласника? Chy rozumnishiy ty za p'yatyklasnyka?	Serhiy Prytula	Novyi Kanal	January 6, 2008 – July 13, 2008
United Kingdom	Are You Smarter than a 10 Year Old?	Noel Edmonds (primetime); Dick and Dom, Damian Williams (daytime)	Sky One	October 7, 2007 – April 24, 2010
United States	Are You Smarter than a 5th Grader?	Jeff Foxworthy	Fox	February 27, 2007 – September 18, 2009; May 26, 2015 – September 8, 2015
United States	Are You Smarter than a 5th Grader?	Jeff Foxworthy	Syndicated by 20th Television	September 21, 2009 – March 24, 2011
United States	Are You Smarter than a 5th Grader?	John Cena	Nickelodeon	June 10, 2019 – November 3, 2019
United States	Are You Smarter than a Celebrity?	Travis Kelce	Amazon Prime Video	October 16, 2024 – present
Vietnam	Ai thông minh hơn học sinh lớp 5?	Tạ Minh Tâm (2009–2010)	HTV2 (now Vie Channel)	June 21, 2009 – June 20, 2010
Vietnam	Ai thông minh hơn học sinh lớp 5?	Thanh Bạch (June 27, 2010 – January 10, 2013); Trấn Thành (January 17, 2013 – January 9, 2014)	VTV3	January 19, 2012 – January 9, 2014
Vietnam	Ai thông minh hơn học sinh lớp 5?	Bình Minh (February 16, 2014 – April 13, 2016)	VTV6	February 16, 2014 – April 5, 2015
Vietnam	Ai thông minh hơn học sinh lớp 5?	Bình Minh (February 16, 2014 – April 13, 2016)	HTV7	April 22, 2015 – April 13, 2016

== Top prize winners ==
This is a list of the known contestants who managed to answer the final question correctly and being able to say "I am smarter than a fifth grader".

Country	Contestants	Prize	Date
Brazil	Сézar	R$200,000	January 13, 2008
Mongolia	Namnansürengiin Naranbaatar (Naagii)	₮1,000,000	August 4, 2021
Myanmar	Sai Sai Kham Leng	K400,000	November 15, 2013
Philippines	Michael V	₱1,000,000	March 2008
Poland	Aleksandra Chomacka	300,000 zł	(unknown)
Poland	Marcin Bielicki	100,000 zł	(unknown)
Romania	Andrei	50,000 lei	December 20, 2023
Romania	Gabriela & Vladimir	50,000 lei	October 9, 2024
Romania	Petre	50,000 lei	November 27, 2024
Russia	Mikhail Shats	1,000,000₽	December 23, 2007
Russia	Tatyana Vedeneyeva	1,000,000₽	February 10, 2008
Russia	Alexander Gordon	1,000,000₽	July 13, 2008
Sweden	Tobias Fagrell	250,000 SEK	May 31, 2013
Sweden	Ingrid Sjöstrand	250,000 SEK	May 2015
Sweden	Bertil Blues Johansson	250,000 SEK	2017
Sweden	Staffan Asplund	250,000 SEK	2017
Sweden	Jonas von Essen	250,000 SEK	April 25, 2020
United States	Kathy Cox	$1,000,000	September 8, 2008
United States	George Smoot	$1,000,000	September 18, 2008
United States	Geoff Wolinetz	$250,000	November 3, 2009
United States	Elizabeth Miller	$250,000	March 10, 2010
United States	Alfred Guy	$100,000	September 6, 2019
Vietnam	Hồ Trung Dũng	₫50,000,000	May 31, 2012

== Video game ==
On October 20, 2008, publisher THQ released the first video game, titled Are You Smarter than a 5th Grader?: Make the Grade, for the PC, PS2, Nintendo DS, Wii, and Xbox Live Arcade. The Xbox Live Arcade version as of mid-2010 was delisted from the Xbox Live Game Marketplace.

A sequel Are You Smarter than a 5th Grader? Game Time was released on October 26, 2009, for Nintendo DS, Wii and Xbox 360.

In 2010, Are You Smarter than a 5th Grader: Back to School was released

Capcom Mobile released a game based on the game show for iOS devices called "Are You Smarter than a 5th Grader 2010" in 2009.

In 2012, Ludia released a free game based on the game show called "Are You Smarter than a 5th Grader? & Friends" for iOS devices.

In 2015, GameMill Entertainment released a game based on the 2015 Fox Primetime revival for the Nintendo 3DS.

A version for PC, PlayStation 4, Nintendo Switch, PlayStation 5, and Xbox Series X/Xbox One, developed and published by THQ Nordic subsidiaries Massive Miniteam and HandyGames, was listed on Steam and Amazon in 2022.

== DVD game ==
Parker Brothers released a DVD game based on the show. Unlike the show, the player can only pick one classmate for the whole game and has a choice of 21 games. A 2-player mode is also available.

== Video slot machine ==
In 2014, AGS (American Gaming Systems) released a slot machine game based on the show (along with Family Feud and Ripley's Believe It or Not!) as part of their "It Pays to Know" series of games. The base of the game is a five-reel scatter pay video slot on a four-by-five, yielding 1,024 possible winning combinations on every spin. packed with bonus event like: "Free Spin Events", "Picking Bonuses" & "Mystery Awards". In the game, players are prompted to choose one of the four "Helpers" fall-backs like eliminating one of the four possible multiple-choice answers or its stats on how the audience would answer the question. The player is then given a first-grade question and then tries to answer it correctly. The earlier the correct answer is picked, the higher the award. Answering a question correctly within three times advance the grade level and the game goes on. Completing the "Gold Star Bonus" in which the player picks from a field of five stars to reveal an advance award. In addition to the "Helper" picked at the beginning, the player can earn any of the three "cheats" by landing symbols on the primary game:

- Peek – Just like the TV show, this help lets you look at the answers of a "classmate". You can then choose to "copy" the answer for the game while the other cheat is "Save" for which it automatically corrects your wrong answer if the classmate has the correct one.
- Field Trip – In this bonus events, the picks are made to reveal multipliers for a free-spin bonus and two primary game events called "Mystery Jackpot" and "Mega Block Spins" where it expands the real field for up to 10 rows of symbols with three wild reels for one super spin.
- Additional Note – In the "Peek" bonus event, the classmate will not always have the right answer.

== See also ==
- Gatekeepers (game show) – A 2010 Singaporean game show with gameplay format borrowed from Are You Smarter than a 5th Grader?, but was not part of the Are You Smarter than a 5th Grader? franchise
- List of television game show franchises
