= On Safari =

On Safari may refer to:

- On Safari (1982 game show), a 1982–1984 British children's game show set in the jungle, presented by Christopher Biggins, and produced by TVS for broadcast on ITV network
- On Safari (2000 game show), a 2000 British children's game show, presented by Richard McCourt, and produced by SMG Productions for broadcast for ITV/CITV
- On Safari (album), a 2016 album by The Kentucky Headhunters
