= Are You Smarter than a Canadian 5th Grader? =

Television series

- Genre: Game show
- Based on: Are You Smarter than a 5th Grader? by: Mark Burnett; Barry Ponznick; John Stevens
- Directed by: Rae Upton
- Presented by: Colin Mochrie
- Theme music composer: David Vanacore
- Country of origin: Canada
- Original language: English
- No. of seasons: 1
- No. of episodes: 5

Production
- Executive producers: Mark Burnett; Roy Bank; Barry Poznick; John Stevens
- Production locations: Canadian Broadcasting Centre; Toronto, Ontario, Canada
- Running time: 60 minutes (including adverts)
- Production companies: Insight Productions; Mark Burnett Productions; Zoo Productions

Original release
- Network: Global
- Release: October 25 – November 22, 2007

Are You Smarter than a Canadian 5th Grader? is a Canadian English television game show, which began airing on October 25, 2007 on Global. The show, based on the U.S. game show Are You Smarter than a 5th Grader?, was hosted by Canadian comedian Colin Mochrie. Five episodes were produced, and aired Thursdays at 9 p.m. ET. Contestants included a lawyer, a professor, a nuclear engineer amongst others. A veterinarian, Andrew Oster, from Midland, Ontario was the show's biggest winner garnering $300,000 (CDN), tax-free.

The show, which was filmed at the Canadian Broadcasting Centre in Toronto, Ontario, challenged contestants to prove that they are smarter than a Canadian fifth grader by answering a series of questions on material from elementary school textbooks. In addition to the subjects present in the American edition (save for American history), the game included Canadian-specific content, such as questions about the French language, Canadian history, geography and culture. The set for the show was similar to the American version, but themed for Canada; for instance, the floor contained a large map of the country.

The class for the show was made up of seven Grade 5 students: Katherine, age 10, from Halifax, Nova Scotia; Nathan, 10, from Calgary, Alberta; Michael, 9, from Vancouver, British Columbia; Isiah, 10, from Mississauga, Ontario; Taylor, 10, from Toronto, Ontario; Jacob, 9, from Bedford, Nova Scotia; and Rachel, 9, from Lockport, Manitoba.

On the show's fourth episode, Nathan and Rachel relinquished their seats. They were replaced by Elliot from Oakville, Ontario and Shea from Brooklin, Ontario, which is a part of Whitby.

Global Television, the network that produced the first season of the show, announced on its website that they are not accepting applications for contestants, and currently have no plans to produce any more episodes.

== Gameplay ==
Question	Value
1	$1,000
2	$2,000
3	$5,000
4	$10,000
5	$25,000
6	$50,000
7	$100,000
8	$175,000
9	$300,000
10	$500,000
11	$1,000,000

1st Subject	2nd Subject
Million Dollar Question	Million Dollar Subject
Grade 5 French	Grade 5 Canadian History
Grade 4 Math	Grade 4 Earth Science
Grade 3 Art	Grade 3 Physical Education
Grade 2 Vocabulary	Grade 2 Astronomy
Grade 1 Social Studies	Grade 1 Literature

The Canadian version of the game was played essentially in the same way as its American counterpart: a contestant was asked a series of eleven questions taken from elementary school textbooks; with each correct answer, the contestant accrued more money; the contestant has 5th grade "classmates" to help them; and in the event of the contestant not winning the top prize, they must look into the camera and tell the world "I am not smarter than a Canadian 5th grader."

There are a number of variations in the Canadian version, however:

- Rather than the five classmates present in the American version, Are You Smarter than a Canadian 5th Grader? features seven students from across the country. This did not affect the game play.
- Canadian content was included in the question material. Added subjects include French, Canadian History and Canadian Geography; Life Systems is used in place of Life Sciences. Measurements was spelled in singular form as Measurement. Earth & Space Systems is used in place of Earth Science.
- Subjects selected were displayed as Grade (1-5) (subject) rather than (1st-5th) Grade (subject), since Canada uses this grammar.
- While the money ladder used the same values as the U.S. version, the prizes were paid in Canadian dollars, and were not subject to taxes.
- The $25,000 plateau question was rebranded as the "Big Brain Academy: Wii Degree $25,000 question". During this question, the children's screens displayed Mii versions of themselves.

Mark Burnett Productions/A&E Network/CanWest Media
