= James McCourt (TV host) =

British television presenter

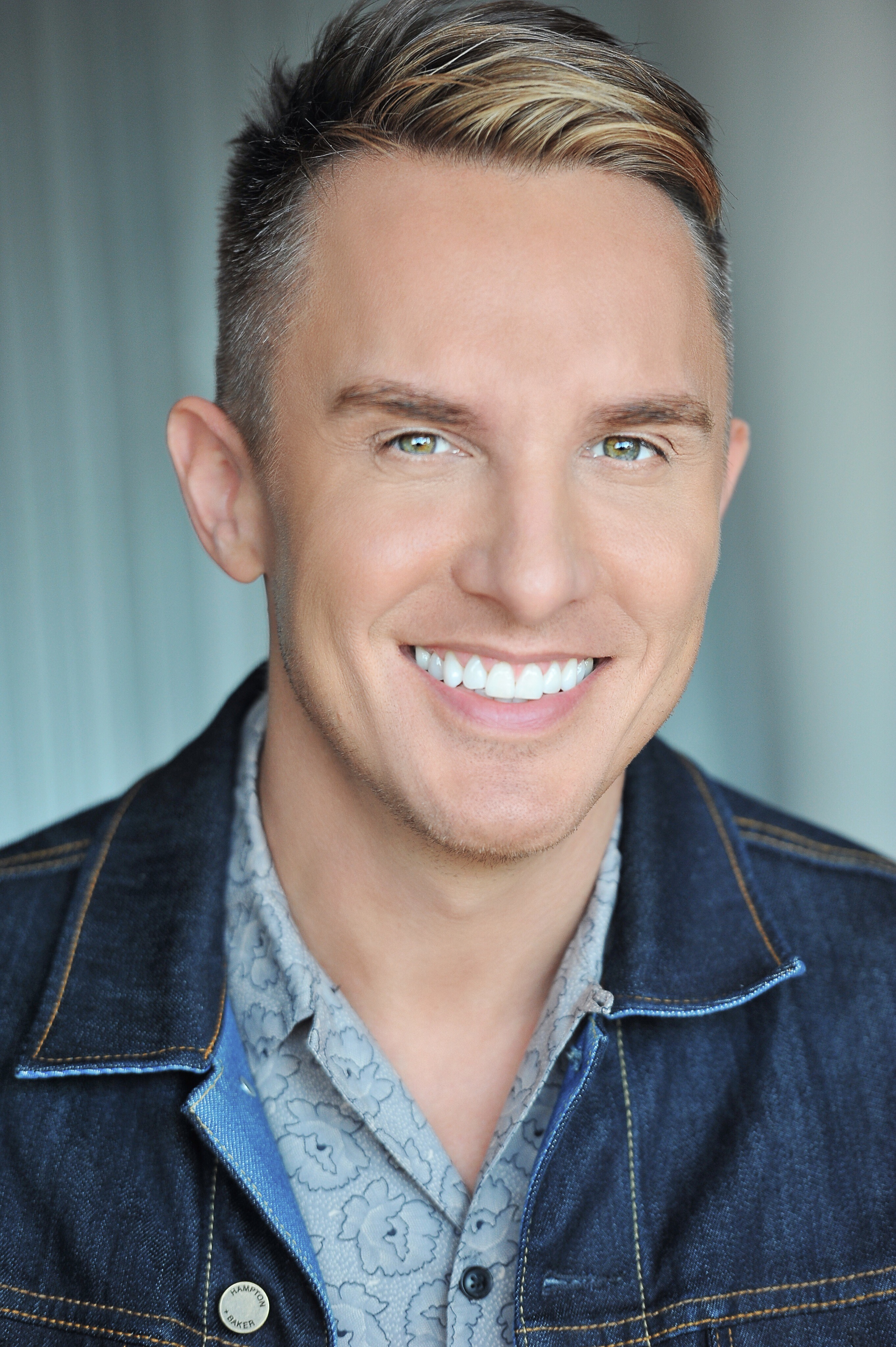
- Born: Sheffield, Yorkshire, England
- Occupations: Television host; correspondent
- Years active: 1997–present
- Television: Good Morning Britain; Extra; TV Guide Network; The National Lottery Draws; Studio Disney UK
- Height: 5 ft 9 in (1.75 m)
- Relatives: Richard McCourt (brother)
- Website: jamesmccourt.com

James McCourt is a British television presenter/host, royal expert, correspondent, and celebrity interviewer.

== Career ==
=== Television ===
McCourt is a host, celebrity interviewer, correspondent, a certified life coach and a royal expert for CNN International, E! The Real Princess Diaries: From Diana to Meghan, Weekend Express and The Daily Share on HLN (TV channel), Extra on NBC, Game Show Network's Cover Story and in 2019 Entertainment Tonight's ET Live in the same capacity. He also writes for Life & Style, In Touch Weekly and Closer Weekly for Bauer Media Group on this subject.

McCourt has appeared as one of the Los Angeles correspondents for Good Morning Britain, appearing for the first time in August 2015 and a showbiz correspondent for Talkradio since March 2016. In the UK he has hosted various The National Lottery Draws on BBC One as well as the EuroMillions draw on UKTV Gold. He reported for Travel Channel and hosted Studio Disney UK, Hot Wired, an educational programme for Channel 4 and Glory ball for Challenge.

McCourt has appeared in the United States on TV Guide Network, hosting Diana: Memories of a Princess and featured regularly as their UK correspondent. He could also be seen on the E! entertainment series Sexiest..., was the live voice of 1 vs. 100 via Xbox Live Primetime in the UK and Ireland during Season 1.

In his early career, McCourt worked for BBC Radio Sheffield and was lead singer a pop band; he still occasionally writes songs for musical theatre shows.

== Personal life ==
His younger brother is the television and radio presenter Richard McCourt, of Dick and Dom fame.
