= Richard McCourt =

British entertainer and presenter (born 1976)

- McCourt in 2017
- Born: 12 August 1976 (age 50); Sheffield, Yorkshire, England
- Occupations: DJ; entertainer; presenter
- Years active: 1996–present
- Known for: Dick and Dom
- Partner(s): Katrina Bryan (2015–present); engaged
- Children: 1
- Relatives: James McCourt (brother)

Richard "Dick" McCourt (born 12 August 1976) is an English entertainer and presenter. He is best known as one half of the comic duo Dick and Dom, with the other being Dominic Wood.

== Career ==
McCourt gained his experience in Sheffield presenting Hospital Television and local television throughout the early '90s. He is best known for co-presenting, with Dominic Wood, Dick & Dom in da Bungalow. The show ran on CBBC and BBC One, from 2002 to 2006 and was famous for its zany games, often played in public places. Dick and Dom had other CBBC hits including The Legend of Dick and Dom, Diddy TV and Absolute Genius with Dick and Dom. From 2007 to 2008 McCourt and Wood hosted the daytime version of Are You Smarter Than A 10 Year Old? on Sky One. In 2011, McCourt and Wood appeared in the feature film Horrid Henry: The Movie, playing 2 Cool 4 School presenters. They trod the boards in the West End as King Arthur and Patsy in Monty Python's Spamalot and starred in the Worlds Biggest Panto, 'Cinderella' alongside the late Paul O'Grady and Bradley Walsh at the Barclaycard Arena, Birmingham.

As DJs, Dick and Dom have performed at events and festivals across the United Kingdom, including Boomtown, the British Grand Prix, Download Festival, Kendal Calling, Boardmasters, and Camp Bestival, as well as university and nightclub events.

== Charity work ==
In 2008, McCourt received the Association of Colleges Gold Award, in recognition of his success in media. The award cited his work advising students interested in media careers. He is an ambassador for Alzheimer's Society and Alzheimer's Research UK and he supports WellChild. In April 2010, he ran the London Marathon, and again in 2021. He has also taken part in several Bupa' Manchester 10k and Great Yorkshire Runs to raise funds for the Alzheimer's Society. In 2006 and 2009 he cycled from London to Paris and has trekked the Great Wall of China all in aid of dementia research.

== Personal life and education ==
McCourt was educated at Tapton School, a state comprehensive in Sheffield. At Norton College, building on his experience as a volunteer at Sheffield's hospital radio station, he studied audio, video and print media, receiving the BTEC National Diploma in media production in 1994. His older brother is fellow television presenter James McCourt.

McCourt supports his home city club Sheffield Wednesday and Manchester United.

McCourt currently resides with his long-term partner Katrina Bryan who he has been dating since 2015. In 2019, Bryan confirmed their engagement via her Instagram page.

In 2021, McCourt announced the birth of his first child on Instagram.

== Filmography ==
=== Television ===
- In-vision continuity 'Broom Cupboard' presentation at CBBC (1996–2000)
- On Safari on CITV (2000)
- Bring It On on CBBC (2001–2002)
- CBBC presentation (2002–2003)
- Dick & Dom in da Bungalow on CBBC (2002–2006)
- Ask the Family on BBC Two (2005)
- Are you Smarter than a 10 Year Old on Sky One (2007–2008)
- The Legend of Dick and Dom on CBBC (2008–2011)
- Da Dick and Dom Dairies (Best of Da Bungalow) on CBBC (2009)
- Dick and Dom Go Wild on CBBC (2010–2011)
- Bananas in Pyjamas (B1) (2011–2013)
- Splatalot! on CBBC (2011–2013)
- Dick and Dom's Hoopla on CBBC (2012)
- Blue Peter: You Decide! (2013)
- Absolute Genius with Dick and Dom on CBBC (2012–2016)
- Diddy Movies on CBBC (2012–2014)
- Diddy TV on CBBC (2016–2018)

=== Radio ===
- Hospital radio Sheffield Children's Hospital (1988–1996)
- Local radio (1993–1996)
- BBC Radio 1's Sunday morning 10 am – 1 pm show, co-hosting with Dominic Wood (2007-2008)
- BBC Sounds' Diddy Pod (2019–2020)
- Cash From Chaos (2019)
- The Dick and Dom Debate (2020)
- Virgin Radio UK (2024 - 2025)

=== Stage ===
On stage, McCourt has appeared in many productions, including:

- Aladdin at the Empire Theatre in Sunderland (1999/2000)
- Cinderella at the Derngate Theatre, Northampton (2000–2001)
- Aladdin at the Theatre Royal, Bath (2001/2002)
- Dick Whittington at the Lyceum Theatre, Sheffield (2002/2003)
- "Spamalot" at the Playhouse Theatre in London's West End (Lead role) (2013/2014)
- Butlin's Dick vs Dom (Stage show) (2014/2016/2018)
- Cinderella at the Birmingham Arena (2015/2016)
- Peter Pan at the Worthing Pier Pavilion Theatre (2016/2017)
- Dick vs Dom (Stage show) (UK tour)
- Beauty and the Beast at the De Montfort Hall in Leicester (2017/2018)
- Edinburgh Festival Dick vs Dom (Stage show)
- Peter Pan at the Empire Theatre in Sunderland (2018/2019)
- Beauty and the Beast at the Fairfield Halls in Croydon (2021/2022)
- Snow White and the Seven Dwarfs at the New Wimbledon Theatre (2022/2023)
- Dick & Dom in da Bungalow 20th Anniversary (UK tour)
