= Ramapo High School =

Ramapo High School can refer to:

- Ramapo High School (New Jersey)
- Ramapo High School (New York)
