= Dick and Dom's Hoopla =

British children's television series

- Presented by: Richard McCourt & Dominic Wood
- Starring: Ian Kirkby; Dave Chapman; Bob Golding; Leigh Gill
- Country of origin: United Kingdom
- Original language: English
- No. of series: 1
- No. of episodes: 10

Production
- Producer: Steve Ryde
- Production locations: Dingles Fairground Heritage Centre, Lifton, Devon
- Running time: 60 minutes

Original release
- Network: CBBC
- Release: 21 September – 24 December 2012

Dick and Dom's Hoopla is a CBBC children's entertainment television series presented by duo Dick and Dom. The show was filmed from June to August 2012 and was first broadcast in September 2012 on Friday evenings on the CBBC Channel.

== Format ==
Dick and Dom's travelling funfair would each week visit a new, fictional location, where they would invite visitors of all ages to participate in a series of themed games, the winner of each would win a Golden Hoop which would earn them a place in the 'Finaleval' at the end of the show. The winner of the Finaleval would be the winner of the show and be awarded the Hoopla Trophy.

In addition to games, Hoopla also featured performances from a variety of entertainment acts, including singers, magicians, acrobats and ventriloquists among others.

=== Games ===
- Gypsy Rose Dick - Contestants would choose at random food stuffs for their opponents to eat, such as cold baked beans, boiled cabbage and curry sauce. The amounts eaten would then be made into its own concoction at the end of the game, the contestant who drank the most would be awarded the Golden Hoop.
- Roger Malcolm's Hat Full of Fear - Two contestants would ride the Roger Malcolm's (Dave Chapman) ghost train while wearing a helmet full of liquid, the winner would be the one who had spilled the least amount.
- The Hand of Cackamanga - Riding in dodgems, contestants would have to avoid Dick and Dom, who wore a giant hand covered in green slime. Any contestant covered in the slime would be eliminated, the last one remaining would win the Golden Hoop.
- Domball ("Dickball" in Episode 1) - Contestants in dodgems would have to direct Dom, in his own motionless car, into a goal at either end of the arena. The captain of the team who scored the most would be awarded the Golden Hoop.
- Brain Scoop - Contestants would sit in a Tilt-A-Whirl ride for sixty seconds while having to read from a fictional newspaper, they would then be quizzed on the headlines, the Golden Hoop would be awarded to the one who answered the most questions correctly.
- Celebrity Darts - Contestants would throw darts at celebrities with different areas marked with higher values, they would also be asked trivia questions about each celebrity, the contestant with the highest score would win the Golden Hoop.
- Kiss or Punch - Contestants were blindfolded and faced with a cardboard cutout of a celebrity, they would then be given clues to the celebrity's identity and would have to decide whether to kiss or punch them.
- The Strongman Challenge - A contestant would win the Golden Hoop if they bested Dick in a series of physical challenges.

=== Finaleval ===
The final game, 'The Finaleval', was done in three stages featuring the four Golden Hoop winners, with one being eliminated in the first two rounds. In the last game, the remaining two contestants would be given eight bins to choose from, one of which contained Cyril the Clown; the contestant who opened the bin with Cyril would be eliminated and the other would win the Golden Hoopla Trophy.

== Reception ==
Despite the show having a positive reaction, with Caitlin Moran writing positively of it in The Times, it ran for only one series.

In December 2012, Ofcom ruled against the programme following complaints when an eleven-year-old participant in the Gypsy Rose Dick segment was shown in discomfort and retching into a bucket. Ofcom found McCourt "verging on the aggressive" during the game and the BBC had failed in their "due care" of the girl.
