= Are You Smarter than a 5th Grader? (Hong Kong game show) =

- 係咪小兒科
- Created by: Fox
- Starring: Leo Ku
- Country of origin: Hong Kong
- No. of episodes: 26 (season 1); 30 (season 2)

Production
- Running time: 60 minutes per episode (episode 1-15); 45 minutes per episode (episode 16-26); 30 minutes per episode (season 2) (inc. commercials)

Original release
- Network: TVB
- Release: 25 October 2008 – 16 November 2009

Are You Smarter than a 5th Grader? (Chinese: 係咪小兒科; lit. 'Is it child's play?') is a game show produced by TVB from 2008 to 2009. It is the Hong Kong version of the American show of the same name. It was hosted by Leo Ku and narrated by Kevin So.

The first season started on 25 October 2008 and ended on 25 April 2009. The second season aired between 5 October 2009 and 16 November 2009.

== Format ==
The format is based on the original 2007-09 United States version (not the level-based format adopted when the show switched to syndication).

The 3 "cheats" are called "參考隔籬" (Peek), "搬字過紙" (Copy) and "自動補答" (Save) respectively.

The question values are also the same as the American version, but in Hong Kong Dollars. The top prize, HK$1,000,000, is about US$129,000.

Question Values
11	$1,000,000		
5	$25,000	10	$500,000
4	$10,000	9	$300,000
3	$5,000	8	$175,000
2	$2,000	7	$100,000
1	$1,000	6	$50,000

The subjects of the questions are:

- Chinese
- English
- Mathematics
- General Studies
- Putonghua
- Science
- Music
- Visual Arts
- Computer
- Physical Education

However, unlike other versions, at the start of every episode, the host will ask an IQ question, which is just for fun, the answer will be announced at the end of that episode.

== List of contestants ==
All the contestants are celebrities. "Drop out" means the contestant quits in the middle of the game, "Flunk out" means the contestant answers the question incorrectly.

=== Season 1 ===
Episode	Date	Contestant	Drop out/Flunk out	Prize won
1	25 October 2008	Sandra Ng	Drop out	HK$50,000
2	1 November 2008	Roger Kwok	Drop out	HK$50,000
3	8 November 2008	So Sze-wong	Flunk out on the HK$100,000 question	HK$25,000
4	15 November 2008	Sammy Leung	Flunk out on the HK$100,000 question	HK$25,000
5	22 November 2008	Eric Kot	Drop out	HK$100,000
6	29 November 2008	Athena Chu	Drop out	HK$100,000
7	6 December 2008	Bosco Wong	Drop out	HK$100,000
8	13 December 2008	Edmond Leung	Drop out	HK$100,000
9	20 December 2008	Eric Suen	Drop out	HK$175,000
10	27 December 2008	Cheung Tat-Ming	Drop out	HK$100,000
11	3 January 2009	Jessica Hsuan	Drop out	HK$175,000
12	10 January 2009	Louis Yuen	Drop out	HK$100,000
13	17 January 2009	Myolie Wu	Drop out	HK$100,000
14	24 January 2009	Andrew Lam	Drop out	HK$100,000
15	31 January 2009	Wong Cho Lam	Drop out	HK$100,000
16	7 February 2009	Ha Yu	Drop out	HK$100,000
17	14 February 2009	Kate Tsui	Drop out	HK$175,000
18	21 February 2009	Law Kar-ying	Flunk out on the HK$100,000 question	HK$25,000
19	28 February 2009	Amigo Choi	Drop out	HK$100,000
20	7 March 2009	Mark Lui	Drop out	HK$50,000
21	14 March 2009	Michael Miu	Drop out	HK$175,000
22	21 March 2009	Ivan Ho	Drop out	HK$100,000
23	28 March 2009	FAMA	Drop out	HK$175,000
24	4 April 2009	Felix Wong, Carlo Ng	Drop out	HK$175,000
25	18 April 2009	I Love You Boyz	Drop out	HK$175,000
26	25 April 2009	Sammy Leung, Kitty Yuen	Drop out	HK$175,000

=== Season 2 ===
Episode	Date	Contestant	Drop out/Flunk out	Prize won
1-2	5–6 October 2009	Michael Tse	Drop out	HK$300,000
3-4	7–8 October 2009	Sunny Chan	Drop out	HK$100,000
5-6	9 and 12 October 2009	Charmaine Sheh	Drop out	HK$175,000
7-8	13–14 October 2009	Kiki Sheung	Drop out	HK$100,000
9-10	15–16 October 2009	Wayne Lai	Drop out	HK$175,000
11-12	20–21 October 2009	Peter So	Drop out	HK$100,000
13-14	22–23 October 2009	Shirley Yeung	Drop out	HK$300,000
15-16	26–27 October 2009	Wong He	Drop out	HK$175,000
17-18	28–29 October 2009	Chapman To, Yumiko Cheng	Drop out	HK$100,000
19-20	30 October – 2 November 2009	Kenny Bee, Benette Pang	Drop out	HK$175,000
21-22	3–4 November 2009	Nancy Sit, Lee Lik-Chi	Drop out	HK$175,000
23-24	5–6 November 2009	Vincy Chan, Wong Cho Lam	Drop out	HK$300,000
25-26	9–10 November 2009	Anthony Wong Chau Sang, Lorretta Chow	Flunk out on the HK$500,000 question	HK$25,000
27-28	11–12 November 2009	Chow Chung, Andrew Lam	Drop out	HK$100,000
29-30	13 and 16 November 2009	Sammy Leung, Kitty Yuen	Drop out	HK$175,000

== Criticism ==
Since the "classmates" of every episode almost got all the questions correctly, many audience thought that they memorized all the answers already before the recording of the show. Some audience may even think that the actual purpose of the show is to bring out the message that children are smarter than adults. Memorizing like that convinced some people they cheated via sophisticated state-of-the-art gadgets, this included "telephoning" individualistic thoughts, pre-recorded hidden textual dialogues and even secrecy in transfer quixotic answers.
