= Ramapo High School (New York) =

High school in New York

Location
- 400 Viola Road; Spring Valley, NY; United States
- Coordinates: 41.13577°N 74.0627°W

Information
- Type: Public high school
- NCES School ID: 362781003779
- Principal: Rhode Octobre-Cooper
- Teaching staff: 127.00 (on an FTE basis)
- Enrollment: 1,694 (as of 2024–2025)
- Student to teacher ratio: 13.34
- Campus type: Suburban
- Colors: Green and Gold
- Mascot: Gryphon
- Website: Website

Ramapo High School is a comprehensive four-year public high school in the East Ramapo Central School District, serving 9th to 12th grade students. It is located at 400 Viola Road in Ramapo, New York in Rockland County.

As of the 2024–25 school year, the school had an enrollment of 1,694 students and 127.0 classroom teachers (on an FTE basis), for a student–teacher ratio of 13.34:1. There were 1,330 students (78.5% of enrollment) eligible for free lunch and 73 (4.3% of students) eligible for reduced-cost lunch.

Ramapo High School has only one campus as of September 2010. It previously included the Ramapo Freshman Center, which is now the Kakiat Elementary School. The Freshman Center was established for the purpose of educating freshmen away from the upperclassmen, partially due to space constraints.

== History ==
In 2008, Ramapo High School served 1,569 students. 49% of Ramapo High School students were female and 51% of students were male.

Ramapo High School had 43% of students attending a four-year institution and 43% of students attending a two-year institution in 2007. New York state had 29% of students attending a four-year institution and 29% of students attending a two-year institution in 2007. Ramapo High School had a 75% graduation rate with Regents Diploma and a 75% graduation rate with Regents Diploma and Advanced Designation in 2007. 75% of New York state students graduated with Regents Diploma and 79% graduated with Regents Diploma and Advanced Designation in 2007. Ramapo High School had a 30% graduation rate with Regents Diploma and a 30% graduation rate with Regents Diploma and Advanced Designation in 2007. 30% of New York state students graduated with Regents Diploma and 39% graduated with Regents Diploma and Advanced Designation in 2007.

In 2008, Ramapo High School had 56% of students were eligible for free or reduced price lunch programs. New York had 44% of eligible students for free or reduced price lunch programs. Eligibility for the National School Lunch Program is based on family income levels.

Ramapo High School served 13% Limited English Proficient (LEP) students in 2007. LEP students are in the process of acquiring and learning English language skills. The state of New York averaged 7% Limited English Proficient (LEP) students in 2007.

In 2008, Ramapo High School had 13 students for every full-time equivalent teacher. The New York average is 13 students per full-time equivalent teacher. However, after recent renovation and changes prompted by the East Ramapo Central School District Board of Education, projections for class sizes were higher for the 2010–2011 school year.

In 2008, Ramapo High School was 65% Black, 17% Hispanic, 10% White, 9% Asian/Pacific Islander and < 1% American Indian/Alaskan Native < 1%. The New York State Averages for High School Ethnic Composition is 20% Black, 21% Hispanic, 52% White, 7% Asian/Pacific Islander and < 1% American Indian/Alaskan Native.

== East Ramapo Marching Band ==
Ramapo High School combines with Spring Valley High School, the other high school within the district, to form the East Ramapo Marching Band. The band was featured in the 2004 film The Manchurian Candidate.

== Courses ==
Ramapo High School offers courses on a quarter basis for grades 10, 11 and 12.

In order to graduate, a student must fulfill New York State Graduation Requirements for a New York State Regents Diploma.
Exams are given as Midterms, after the first two quarters, and as finals, after all four quarters.

=== Core courses ===
- English
- Foreign Language
- History
- Mathematics
- Physical Education
- Science

=== Electives ===
- Art
- BOCES
- Foreign Language
- Mathematics
- Music
- Physical Education
- Technology

=== Advanced placement courses ===
- Biology
- Chemistry
- Calculus AB
- Calculus BC
- English Language and Composition
- English Literature and Composition
- US History
- World History

=== College level courses ===
- Syracuse University Project Advance offers courses in Psychology, Public Affairs, Economics, English, Sociology and Speech.

== Athletics ==
As of the 2014–2015 school year, the following sports are offered at Ramapo High School.

=== Interscholastic sports ===
FALL SPORTS

- JV & Varsity Football
- JV & Varsity Boys Soccer
- JV & Varsity Girls Soccer
- Varsity Girls Swimming
- Varsity Girls Volleyball
- Varsity Girls Tennis

WINTER SPORTS

- JV & Varsity Boys Basketball
- JV & Varsity Girls Basketball
- JV & Varsity Wrestling

Varsity Male and Female Fencing

- Indoor Boys Track & Field
- Indoor Girls Track & Field
- Varsity Boys Bowling
- Varsity Girls Bowling

SPRING SPORTS

- JV & Varsity Baseball
- JV & Varsity Softball
- Boys Track & Field
- Girls Track & Field
- Varsity Boys Tennis

=== Achievements ===
- 2003 Men's Varsity Football Team finished the regular season undefeated for first time in school history.

== Notable alumni ==
- Doug Besterman (born 1965), orchestrator
- Al Cole (born 1964), professional boxer
- James Matthew Jones (born 1961), public health expert and philanthropist
- Marco Katz (born 1952), musician
- Audrey Landers (born 1956), actress
- Judy Landers (born 1958), actress
- Anne L. Nathan, actress
- Michael Rogers (born 1963), blogger and fundraiser
- Helen Schneider (born 1952), singer
- Connie Sellecca (born 1955), actress
- Peter Ungar, (born 1963), scientist
- Geoff Wolinetz, writer, game show winner
- David Zaslav (born 1960), media executive; CEO and President of Warner Bros. Discovery
