= Are You Smarter than a 10 Year Old? (British game show) =

Television series

- Also known as: Noel's Are You Smarter Than a/Your 10 Year Old? (primetime); Dick & Dom's Are You Smarter Than a 10 Year Old? / Damian's Are You Smarter Than Your 10 Year Old? (daytime)
- Created by: Mark Burnett
- Presented by: Primetime; Noel Edmonds; Daytime; Dick and Dom (2007–2009); Damian Williams (2009–2010)
- Voices of: Dave Kelly
- Country of origin: United Kingdom
- Original language: English
- No. of series: 3 (primetime); 3 (daytime)
- No. of episodes: 66 (primetime); 120 (daytime)

Production
- Running time: 60 minutes (inc. adverts)
- Production companies: Mark Burnett Productions and Twofour

Original release
- Network: Sky 1
- Release: 7 October 2007 – 24 April 2010

Related
- Are You Smarter than a 5th Grader?

Are You Smarter than a/Your 10 Year Old? is a British quiz show which aired on Sky 1 from 2007 to 2010. There were two editions, one broadcast weekly in primetime, hosted by Noel Edmonds and a daily version, originally hosted by Dick and Dom and later by Damian Williams. The show welcomes adult contestants, who attempt to answer ten questions (plus a final bonus question) taken from primary school textbooks, two from each school year from ages 6 to 10. Each correct answer increases the amount of money the player banks; a maximum cash prize of £250,000 (or £500,000 in series three) in primetime and £50,000 in daytime can be won.

The programme was based on the American television game show Are You Smarter than a 5th Grader?.

== Format ==
In each game, the contestant (an adult) is asked a series of up to eleven questions, spanning ten subjects (such as history, maths or science) taken from textbooks for 6- to 10-year-old students. Each question is associated with an age level; there are two questions per age group, from 6 to 10. The player can answer the questions in any order, and each correct answer raises their cumulative amount of winnings to the next level (see table). There is a safe point after five correct answers, guaranteeing the player the value of the fifth question, and after ten questions players may take a jackpot question for the top prize.

== Classmates ==
Along the way, the player can be assisted by a "classmate", one of five ten-year-old children, in answering the questions. The classmate, chosen for two questions at a time, attempts to answer the question at the same time as the contestant, writing their answer on a virtual blackboard hidden from the contestant's view. The player picks a child to come and stand on the podium beside them and they answer the question at the same time as the adult. They lock in their answer and the adult is given the option of copying the child's answer or peeking at it. If they lock in their own answer and get the question wrong, they can be saved by the child's answer provided it is correct.

Prior to the show, the children are provided with workbooks which contain a variety of material, some of which could be used in the questions asked in the game. One of the producers, Hannah Dobson, is quoted as saying: "A lot of it they've seen at school, it's just refreshing their memories, really". However, when pushed as to whether the packs contained a random selection of the syllabus or a very specific selection of information, she replied: "I would say it's somewhere in the middle." It can be argued that the questions are actually not representative of the general knowledge of the average 10-year-old, however, as the TimesOnline article states, to have entitled the show "Are you Smarter Than a 10 Year Old Who's Been Hand-picked for High Academic Achievement and Been Given an Answer Pack While You Haven't" would not have been as catchy as the current title. Of course, the children are not immune from getting the answer wrong as well, and they do sometimes enter incorrect answers.

For the first two series, the following children were hired specifically for the show:

=== Series 1 ===
- Group A – Louis, Lizzie, Reece Darlington-Delaire, Qasim Ali, Katie Bilsborough
- Group B – Kaya, Luisa, Richard Linnell, Kieran Potts, Lewis Holmes
- Group C – Lloyd Donovan, Rhiannon Obinyah Meisha Kelly, Jack Roberts, Jonathan Danciger

Some children were used as reserves and as such could appear in any of the groups.

- Lisa Hardin, Kieran, Ryan, Mae

=== Series 2 ===
- Alice Nokes – Wallington, Surrey
- Alicia Lai – Peterborough
- Ben Wilson – Cheshunt, Hertfordshire
- Evan Coxley – Abercynon, South Wales
- Evie Taylor – West Sussex
- Harry Carnaby – Wickford, Essex
- Joel Britton – Leeds
- Jonny Taylor – Leeds
- Joseph Fletcher – Liverpool
- Josh Bainbridge – County Durham
- Kane Blackledge – Hornchurch, Essex
- Lily Johnstone – Burry Port, South Wales
- Luca Cericola – Heston, London
- Madeleine Slader – Hertfordshire
- Olivia Midgley – Brighouse, West Yorkshire
- Rhia Patel – Surrey
- Sam Tott - Broxbourne, Hertfordshire
- Simon Padley-Derby
- Sameera Khalifa – Bradford
- Sion Davies – Llanelli, Wales
- Yasmin Connolly – Shropshire

=== Series 3 ===
The third series of the programme changed the format slightly and was called Are You Smarter Than Your 10 Year Old? with contestants playing against a class including a relative and four of their friends. The Prime Time version jackpot was increased to £500,000 and featured 10 episodes, hosted by Noel Edmonds.

A further 20 teatime episodes of the spin-off, Are You Smarter Than Your 10 Year Old were hosted by Damian Williams, a comedy actor and well-known pantomime star, who was new to television. His version included The Safety Dance in which he led the class, crew and sometimes the contestant around the set to the theme tune of 'Please Sir'

| Date | Adult | 10-year-olds | Relation |
|---|---|---|---|
| ? | Chrissy | Chloe, Jade, Isabella, Claudia, Gracie | Mother of Chloe |
| 25 December 2009 | Stuart | Daniel, Jasmine, Jake, Euan, Sam | Father of Daniel |
| 25–26 December 2009 | Lara | Santiago, Andrew, Roseanne, Ross, Gabriella | Mother of Santiago |
| 17–24 January 2010 | Danny | Megan, Eloise, Rachel, Fleur, Millie | Father of Megan |
| 24 January 2010 | Phil | Megan, Patrick, Tom, Alice, Jordan | Father of Megan |
| "?" | Nicki | Abby, Jonah, Lucas, Sienna and Billie Joe | Mother of Abby |
| “?” | Clare | Grace, Mhairi H, Mhairi U, Robin and Ronan | Mother of Ronan |

All of the third series episodes were filmed in HD and one in 3D.

== Cheats ==
Contestants have three aids they can use during their game. Each of the following cheats can only be used once in any game. (up to, but not including, the final question):

- Peek: The player is shown their classmate's answer and may choose whether to use it or not. There is no obligation and the player is free to lock in an alternative answer.
- Copy: The player uses their classmate's answer, regardless of whether it's right or wrong.
- Save: If the player answers incorrectly but their classmate is correct, they are said to have been saved and the game continues. The player can only use this cheat after supplying an answer.

Once all three cheats are used, the children no longer play an active role in the game. There are no cheats available for the final question regardless of how many, if any, are still available by this point in the game.

| Question | | 1 | 2 | 3 | 4 | 5 | 6 | 7 | 8 | 9 | 10 | 11 |
| Value | prime time (2007-2010) | £250 | £500 | £1,000 | £2,500 | £5,000 | £10,000 | £15,000 | £25,000 | £50,000 | £100,000 | £250,000 (£500,000 in series 3) |
| Value | daytime | £250 | £500 | £750 | £1,000 | £1,500 | £2,500 | £5,000 | £7,500 | £15,000 | £25,000 | £50,000 |

== Jackpot question ==
The rules change slightly for the jackpot question. The player is only shown the subject of the question before deciding if they will continue or drop out. This question will always be for a ten year old regardless of the subject. If the player chooses to see the question, they are no longer eligible to drop out and must answer the question, with no assistance from the classmates. Answering the question incorrectly will cause the contestant to drop back down to the prize for 5 questions.

If the contestant gets any answer wrong (and is not saved), they "flunk out", and a contestant doing so in the first five questions loses all their winnings (if they passed the 5th question, they will instead drop down to that amount). For this reason, they may choose to drop out at any point during the game, which entitles them to leave the game with the winnings they have accumulated, if any.

If, at any point during the game, the player chooses to drop out or is flunked out, they must face the camera and state, "I am not smarter than a/my 10 year old." However, if the final question is answered correctly, the contestant has the opportunity to claim, "I am smarter than a/my 10 year old."

== Transmissions ==
=== Primetime ===
| Series | Start date | End date | Episodes |
|---|---|---|---|
| 1 | 7 October 2007 | 4 May 2008 | 21 |
| 2 | 21 September 2008 | 17 September 2009 | 35 |
| 3 | 21 February 2010 | 24 April 2010 | 10 |

=== Daytime ===
| Series | Start date | End date | Episodes |
|---|---|---|---|
| 1 | 12 November 2007 | 1 February 2008 | 50 |
| 2 | 12 January 2009 | 20 March 2009 | 50 |
| 3 | 21 December 2009 | 26 February 2010 | 20 |
