= Absolute Genius with Dick and Dom =

- Title cards for Series 1-2
- Also known as: Appsolute Genius (2014–15); Absolute Genius: Super Tech (2015–16); Absolute Genius: Monster Builds (2016)
- Presented by: Richard McCourt; Dominic Wood
- Country of origin: United Kingdom
- Original language: English
- No. of series: 5
- No. of episodes: 44

Production
- Running time: 30 minutes

Original release
- Network: CBBC
- Release: 23 January 2013 – 7 December 2016

Absolute Genius with Dick and Dom is a British television series broadcast on CBBC and presented by Richard McCourt and Dominic Wood (Dick and Dom). In each episode the duo study the work of a genius (three geniuses in later series) and attempt to recreate one of their ideas, occasionally with some improvements using technology not available in the subject's lifetime. They are assisted by Fran Scott (credited as Science Consultant) and experts in the field of what is being studied.

The series was one of several commissioned by the BBC to interest young children in science, it follows the success of Professor Brian Cox who has been credited with making teenagers interested in the subject. The BBC chose Dick and Dom as the appropriate presenters for the intended age group.

In November 2014, Dick and Dom won the 2014 Children's Presenter BAFTA Award for series 2 of the show

In summer 2014, CBBC renewed the program for a third and fourth series. The third was called Appsolute Genius and explored video games, while the fourth, Absolute Genius: Super Tech looked at technology from around the world. The fifth and final series, titled Absolute Genius: Monster Builds, was filmed and released in 2016 and looked at geniuses behind monster builds.

== Series overview ==
Series	Episodes	Originally released	
Series	Episodes	First released	Last released
1	10	23 January 2013	27 March 2013
2	10	22 January 2014	2 April 2014
3	8	7 October 2014	26 March 2015
4	8	28 October 2015	18 February 2016
5	8	19 October 2016	7 December 2016

== Episode list ==
=== Series 1 (2013) ===
Filming took place between July and October 2012.

#	Title	Genius studied	Original release date
1	"Archimedes"	Archimedes of Syracuse	23 January 2013
Dick and Dom reveal the genius of Archimedes, the ancient Greek mathematician and expert engineer. Inspired by Archimedes, they come up with their own genius idea when they bring one of his most brilliant inventions to life, with some explosive results.
2	"Von Braun"	Wernher von Braun	30 January 2013
Dick and Dom reveal the genius of rocket scientist Wernher von Braun. Inspired by von Braun's ideas, Dick and Dom come up with their own genius idea, involving a small doll, a huge helium balloon and a journey into space.
3	"Sir Issac Newton"	Isaac Newton	6 February 2013
Dick and Dom reveal the genius of Sir Isaac Newton, one of the greatest scientists of all time, and explore his theories of gravity. Inspired by Newton, Dick and Dom come up with their own genius idea when they attempt to defy the laws of gravity by riding the Wall of Death.
4	"Michael Faraday"	Michael Faraday	13 February 2013
Dick and Dom reveal the genius of Michael Faraday, a pioneer of electricity whose discoveries helped power the planet. Inspired by Faraday's genius ideas, Dick and Dom come up with their own genius idea, involving a cage and almost a million volts of electricity. The results are shocking!
5	"Delia Derbyshire"	Delia Derbyshire	20 February 2013
Dick and Dom reveal the genius of Delia Derbyshire, a pioneer of modern-day music who helped create the Doctor Who theme tune. Inspired by Derbyshire, they come up with their own genius idea when they record their own version of the Doctor Who theme tune with a twist.
6	"Bazalgette"	Joseph Bazalgette	27 February 2013
Dick and Dom reveal the genius of Sir Joseph Bazalgette, the man who invented London's giant sewer system. Inspired by Bazalgette's genius idea, Dick and Dom come up with their own genius idea to demonstrate the explosive power of poo.
7	"Watt"	James Watt	6 March 2013
Dick and Dom reveal the genius of Scottish inventor and engineer James Watt, who revolutionised steam technology. Inspired by Watt, Dick and Dom come up with their own genius idea, when they build and race a steam-powered tandem bike.
8	"Elsie Widdowson"	Elsie Widdowson	13 March 2013
Dick and Dom reveal the genius of food expert Elsie Widdowson, who helped to devise wartime rationing. Under her diet, Britain was the healthiest it had ever been. Inspired by Widdowson, Dick and Dom come up with their own genius idea involving rations, army cadets and a gruelling assault course.
9	"Da Vinci"	Leonardo da Vinci	20 March 2013
Dick and Dom reveal the genius of artist and inventor Leonardo da Vinci. They are inspired to come up with their own genius idea by bringing one of da Vinci's boldest inventions to life, using a tank, a medieval army and some rotten tomatoes.
10	"Brunel"	Isambard Kingdom Brunel	27 March 2013
Dick and Dom reveal the genius of engineer extraordinaire Isambard Kingdom Brunel and are inspired to come up with their own genius idea, which involves climbing to the top of one of the tallest bridges in the world.

=== Series 2 (2014) ===
Filming for this series was between July and October 2013.

#	Title	Genius(es) studied	Original release date
11	"Wright Brothers"	Wright brothers	22 January 2014
Dick and Dom reveal the genius of the Wright brothers, the men behind the first ever powered and controlled flight. Inspired by the Wright brothers, they come up with their own genius idea, which involves a terrifying flight in a stunt plane.
12	"Fleming"	Alexander Fleming	29 January 2014
Dick and Dom reveal the genius of Alexander Fleming, the man who discovered penicillin. Inspired by Fleming's discovery, they come up with their own genius idea, which involves an attempt to turn billions of germs into priceless works of art.
13	"Marconi"	Guglielmo Marconi	5 February 2014
Dick and Dom reveal the genius of Italian inventor Guglielmo Marconi, the man behind wireless communication. Inspired by Marconi, Dick and Dom come up with their own genius idea, which involves Dick taking to the skies in a hang-glider for an extreme radio broadcast.
14	"Benz"	Karl Benz	12 February 2014
Dick and Dom reveal the genius of Karl Benz, the man behind the first petrol-powered car. Inspired by Benz, Dick and Dom come up with their own genius idea, when they build and race their own cars.
15	"Herschel"	Caroline Herschel	19 February 2014
Dick and Dom reveal the genius of astronomer Caroline Herschel, the first woman to spot one of the most mysterious objects in the Solar System, a comet. Inspired by her genius, they come up with their own genius idea when they make their own comet-inspired action movie.
16	"Al-Jazari"	al-Jazari	26 February 2014
Dick and Dom reveal the genius of Al-Jazari, an ancient engineer who built mind-blowing machines that were designed to entertain and impress everyone who saw them. Influenced by Al-Jazari, Dick and Dom come up with their own genius idea when they build their own Al-Jazari-inspired robot.
17	"Darwin"	Charles Darwin	5 March 2014
Dick and Dom reveal the genius of Charles Darwin and explore the theory of evolution. Inspired by Darwin's genius ideas, they come up with their own genius idea when they take the plunge and go face to face with one of the most perfectly evolved predators on the planet - a terrifying shark!
18	"Turing"	Alan Turing	12 March 2014
Dick and Dom reveal the genius of Alan Turing, World War II codebreaker and the man behind the modern-day computer. Inspired by Turing's genius, Dick and Dom come up with their own genius idea, when they use the power of computers to put on a spectacular fireworks display.
19	"Curie"	Marie Curie	26 March 2014
Dick and Dom reveal the genius of Marie Curie, one of the most famous female scientists of all time. Inspired by Curie's genius ideas, they come up with their own, involving an exploding shed.
20	"Talbot"	Henry Fox Talbot	2 April 2014
Dick and Dom reveal the genius of Fox Talbot, a pioneer of photography. Inspired by him, they come up with their own genius idea when they turn a bin into a giant pinhole camera.

=== Series 3 (2014-2015) ===
In this series, Dick and Dom move on from science and now look at all the apps that people can download to their iPads, phones and computers. At the end of each show they try to make their own game in real life. This last segment is narrated by YouTube personality Joseph Garrett (AKA "Stampy Cat"). Series 3 ran for 8 Episodes over 8 weeks. Series 3 was titled Appsolute Genius with Dick & Dom. The series also ran a competition to create a new app and game for the CBBC website, the winner of which was 14-year-old Alex, which was later made into 'Escargot Escape Artistes'. Filming for this series took place between March and July 2014.

#	Title	Genius(es) studied	Original release date
21	"Programme One"	N/A	7 October 2014
Dick and Dom explore the world of computer games. They reveal some of the past and present games that have had a major impact on the gaming world. Celebrity gamers talk about their favourite games - from the ones they can't put down to the ones they're so bad at even their gran could beat them.
22	"Animation"	Walt Disney; Yuji Naka; Jordan Mechner	14 October 2014
Dick and Dom explore animation in computer games and reveal the three geniuses whose brilliant ideas all helped develop animation in gaming through the years.
23	"Character"	Toru Iwatani; Jim Henson; Colin Urquhart	21 October 2014
In this episode, Dick and Dom discover how characters are created for computer games. They reveal three geniuses who have all created iconic characters that we know and love.
24	"Story"	J. R. R. Tolkien; Ron Gilbert; Yoshinori Kitase	28 October 2014
In this episode, Dick and Dom discover the genius of stories in computer games. They reveal three geniuses who have all created legendary tales.
25	"Building a World"	Andrew Whalley; Shigeru Miyamoto; Markus Persson	4 November 2014
Dick and Dom discover the genius of worlds and environments in computer games. They reveal three geniuses who have all created amazing worlds.
26	"Coding"	Ada Lovelace; Ralph Baer; Tim Berners-Lee	11 November 2014
Dick and Dom discover the genius of coding in computer games. They reveal three geniuses who have changed the programming world.
27	"Platform"	Allan Alcorn; Bill Gates; Steve Jobs	18 November 2014
Dick and Dom discover the genius of platforms in computer games. They reveal three geniuses who have changed the way we play games.
28	"The Winner's Story"	N/A	26 March 2015
In the final episode of the series, Dick and Dom meet the winner of their amazing competition to design your own computer game.

=== Series 4 (2015-2016) ===
In Series 4, Dick and Dom are now looking at super tech from all over the world, from tech that can save lives, to tech that you can buy, to tech that is out of this world, and at the end of each show, they try to make their own super tech and beat the challenge set to them. Series 4 ran for 8 Episodes over 8 weeks. Series 4 was titled Absolute Genius Super Tech with Dick & Dom. The series was filmed between November 2015 and January 2016.

#	Title	Genius(es) studied	Original release date
29	"Space Tech"	Sergei Korolev; Konstantin Tsiolkovsky; Rob Manning	28 October 2015
Dick and Dom look to the stars and reveal three geniuses whose tech-tastic ideas have pioneered space travel. The boys go to Nasa to see where real astronauts train before going to space, meet the man who sent the Rover to Mars, and get to drive a real space vehicle!
30	"Robots"	William Grey Walter; Marvin Minsky; Satoshi Shigemi	4 November 2015
Dick and Dom meet man's future best friend - robots! The boys reveal three geniuses whose ideas have changed the world of robotics and they come face to face with one of the world's largest humanoid robots. They also create their very own destructive robot!
31	"Techno Toys"	TBA	11 November 2015
Dick and Dom get to play with the coolest toys with tech from both the past and the future. The boys reveal three geniuses whose ideas have changed the way we play and get to ride a real-life hoverboard and drive a full-sized remote-controlled car!
32	"Communication"	TBA	18 November 2015
Dick and Dom look at how technology has changed the way we communicate and the geniuses behind the innovations. From how a film star's idea to help win World War II led to Wi-Fi, to how technology may one day allow us to communicate just using our brains.
33	"Superhuman Tech"	TBA	25 November 2015
Dick and Dom attempt to become superheroes by using technology to have superpowers, and reveal three geniuses whose inventions allow us to do the impossible, from breathing underwater to having superhuman strength and even extra limbs! Not only that, Dom becomes a real-life human wrecking ball.
34	"Super Transport"	TBA	2 December 2015
Dick and Dom look at the geniuses whose ideas have changed travel and explore how people might travel in the future. They visit Germany to get a ride in a driverless car and attempt hyperspeed when they make their own mini version of the future of transport.
35	"Dick and Dom's Tech"	TBA	9 December 2016
Dick and Dom travel through time to look at five of their favourite technological innovations that have changed the way we live at home. With the help from tech experts, their celebrity friends and science buddy Fran, they look at how these inventions work, and how they have changed the way we live.
36	"Absolute Genius"	TBA	18 February 2016
Dick and Dom put the eight finalists of the Absolute Tech Genius contest through their paces to crown one of them the ultimate absolute tech genius. Judging these finalists through a variety of challenges will be industry experts, including Jon Bentley from the Gadget Show, Clive Beale from Raspberry Pi, Lucy Hedges, the tech editor of the Metro, and our very own CBBC channel controller - Cheryl Taylor. The three finalists who make it through to the later stages of the contest will be flying out to America to attend CES in Las Vegas and Apple HQ in Silicon Valley to meet the ultimate tech genius - Sir Jonathan Ive.

=== Series 5 (2016) ===
In Series 5, Dick and Dom and Fran are looking at monster builds. The fifth series, titled Absolute Genius: Monster Builds, was confirmed on 2 June 2016. Filming took place throughout 2016 The fifth series began airing on CBBC on 19 October 2016.

#	Title	Genius(es) studied	Original release date
37	"Deep Underground"	Eupalinos; Alfred Nobel; James Robbins	19 October 2016
Dick and Dom don their hard hats and head underground to reveal the three tunnelling geniuses whose ideas revolutionised the way we dig deep below the earth. Needing no excuse to blow things up, they put the genius of dynamite to the test and visit the world's largest boring drill burrowing its way through the Alps, before building their own epic tunnelling robot!
38	"Mile High City"	TBA	26 October 2016
Dick and Dom head to the home of the skyscraper, New York city, to piece together the genius ideas that have seen buildings soar to incredible heights. Braving the scary heights of some mammoth structures, the boys become human guinea pigs at a lift-testing facility, get right up close to the blistering heat of a steelworks and attempt to build their own skyscraper from a very unexpected material.
39	"Battling Nature"	TBA	2 November 2016
Dick and Dom go head to head with the fiercest forces in nature as they enter the genius world of engineering against floods, wind and earthquakes. They head to the Netherlands to see how one of the world's great coastal defences keeps the sea at bay, find a suitably hair-raising method to put earthquake proofing to the test and tackle gale-force winds in their bid to stormproof their most precious possessions.
40	"Massive Movers"	TBA	9 November 2016
Dick and Dom go supersized in this massive movers spectacular in which they trace the origins of the genius ideas that have made shifting heavy weights a whole lot easier. In their element, the boys head to a scrapyard to find out how hydraulic grabbers work, get up close to one of the weirdest-looking aircraft ever built and get to grips, literally, with the world's largest hydraulic hand.
41	"Everlasting Energy"	TBA	16 November 2016
Dick and Dom's quest takes them into the frazzling, windy and fast-flowing world of renewable energy. Heading deep into the searing Nevada desert, the pair discover how the sun's energy could keep the world powered forever. At the iconic Hoover Dam, they uncover the genius behind how a vast lake can generate epic amounts of power, before they put all they've learnt to the test with their own suitably wacky take on a power station.
42	"Under Attack"	TBA	23 November 2016
Dick and Dom are under attack in this high-octane tour through defensive engineering. The boys delve into the work of three geniuses whose ideas have given us impregnable castles and reinforced concrete bunkers and may one day protect planet Earth from asteroid attack! To top things off, they head to the seaside for a mega-sized game of smash the sandcastle.
43	"Epic Bridges"	TBA	30 November 2016
Dick and Dom turn their attention to the incredible world of monster bridges, tracing the genius ideas that have taken us from ancient Roman arches to elegant cable-stayed suspension spans, to a future where we may see bridges 3D-printed by robots. In their challenge, the boys join the Royal Engineers for an army bridge-build race... complete with a severe dressing-down for the loser.
44	"Ultimate Playground"	TBA	7 December 2016
Absolute Genius presenters Dick and Dom sample all the fun of the fair in this thrill ride through the engineering genius of roller coasters and water slides. As well as learning how coasters somehow stay on the track when upside down, the boys don their swim shorts and bravely research the science behind the world's fastest water slides. Then they put their theories to the test with an epic slide challenge which attempts to topple a record owned by a certain Usain Bolt.
