= David Zaslav =

American media executive (born 1960)

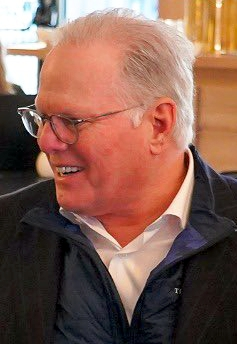
- Zaslav in 2026
- Born: January 15, 1960 (age 66); New York City, U.S.
- Education: Binghamton University (BS); Boston University (JD)
- Occupation: Media executive
- Known for: Media executive, Discovery, Inc. and WarnerMedia merger
- Title: Former CEO and president of Discovery, Inc. and Warner Bros. Discovery
- Spouse: Pam Zaslav
- Children: 3

David Zaslav (/ˈzæzlɑːv/; born January 15, 1960) is an American media executive who was the CEO of Discovery, Inc. from 2006 to 2022, and its successor Warner Bros. Discovery from 2022 to 2026. Zaslav worked at NBCUniversal from 1989 to 2006, where he helped develop and launch the cable channels CNBC and MSNBC. He joined Discovery following his departure from NBCUniversal, where he oversaw its initial public offering in 2008 and merger with WarnerMedia on April 8, 2022. Following the merger, he remained CEO of Warner Bros. Discovery from its founding up until its sale to Paramount Skydance on October 6, 2026, after which he departed from the company.

== Early life ==
David Zaslav was born into a Jewish family in New York City's Brooklyn borough on January 15, 1960. His family was part of the diaspora from Poland and Ukraine. At the age of eight, he moved with his family to Ramapo, New York, where he graduated from Ramapo High School. He earned a B.S. from Binghamton University, then graduated with honors from the Boston University School of Law with a J.D. in 1985. He started his career as an attorney with LeBoeuf, Lamb, Lieby and MacRae in New York.

== Career ==
=== NBCUniversal ===
Zaslav joined NBC in 1989. As president of Cable and Domestic TV and New Media Distribution, he helped develop and launch CNBC and MSNBC, oversaw content distribution to all forms of TV, negotiated for cable and satellite carriage of NBCUniversal networks and forged media partnerships.

His responsibilities extended to Bravo, CNBC World, SCI FI, ShopNBC, Sleuth, Telemundo, Telemundo Puerto Rico, mun2, Trio, Universal HD, USA Network, NBC Weather Plus and the Olympics on cable.

Zaslav also oversaw NBCUniversal's interests in A&E, The History Channel, The Biography Channel, National Geographic International, the Sundance Channel and TiVo.

=== Discovery, Inc. ===
Zaslav became CEO of Discovery Communications in November 16, 2006, succeeding Judith McHale. Zaslav instigated a shift in strategy by the company, aiming to see itself as a "content company" rather than a "cable company" by bolstering its main networks (such as its namesake Discovery Channel) as multi-platform brands. As CEO, Zaslav oversaw the development and launch of new networks such as Planet Green (later rebranded as Destination America), The Hub, Oprah Winfrey Network (OWN), Velocity (later rebranded as MotorTrend), and Investigation Discovery, as well as the company's 2018 acquisition of Scripps Networks Interactive, expansion of its digital education operations, and launch of streaming service discovery+.

Under his direction, Discovery began trading as a public company in 2008, became a Fortune 500 company in 2014 and acquired Scripps Networks Interactive in 2018 for $14.6 billion, becoming Discovery, Inc with new networks including Food Network, HGTV, and DIY Network.

=== Warner Bros. Discovery ===
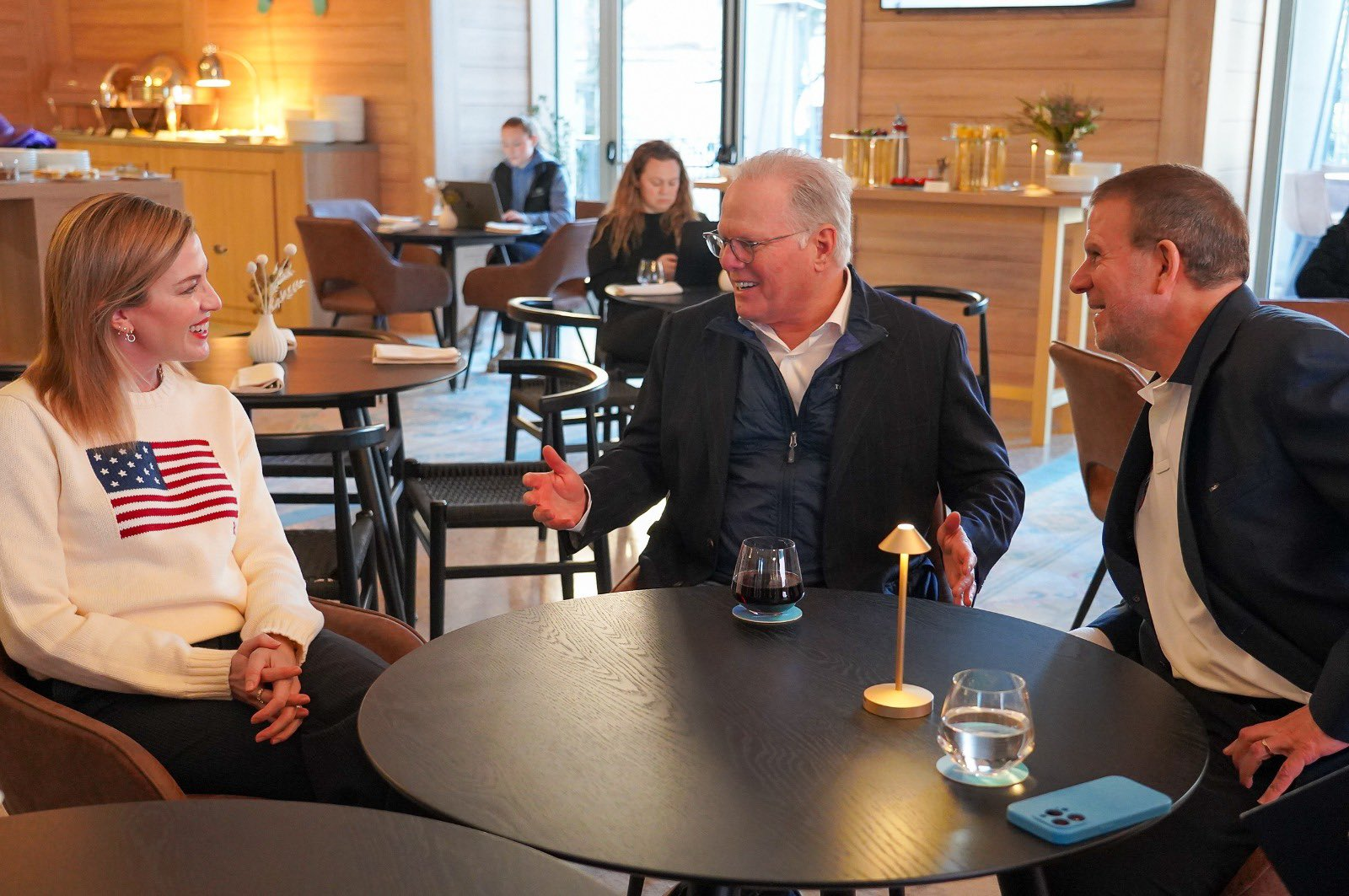
Zaslav during a meeting with United States ambassador to Italy and San Marino Tilman Fertitta in February 2026

In May 2021, it was announced that Zaslav would serve as CEO of a proposed merger of Discovery with a spin-out of AT&T's WarnerMedia, succeeding Jason Kilar. The $43 billion deal was closed on April 8, 2022. Zaslav's executive compensation package includes an annual salary of $3 million with an annual $22 million bonus. In his contract extension, Zaslav also received stock options valued at $190 million. In 2023, Zaslav's total compensation from Warner Bros. Discovery was $49.7 million, representing a CEO-to-median worker pay ratio of 290-to-1.

Under Zaslav's direction, Warner Bros. Discovery launched Max, a combined streaming offering that brought together the libraries of HBO Max and Discovery+. The service debuted in the US on March 23, 2023, in Latin America and the Caribbean on February 27, 2024, and in parts of EMEA on May 21, 2024, with additional international markets to follow. Zaslav appeared as an interviewee in the 2023 Max miniseries 100 Years of Warner Bros., which looked at the history of Warner Bros. to celebrate the studio's 100th anniversary. Zaslav, WBD board member John Malone and Brian Roberts of Comcast also backed another miniseries titled Call Me Ted, focusing on the life of Ted Turner, who founded several businesses owned by WBD.

Since August 2022, Zaslav has received massive criticism from consumers and industry figures for his decision to cancel projects in order to claim tax write-offs. The total accounted loss was nearly $25 billion off the company's market cap. Some of these projects were "practically finished" or in the late stages of post-production, including Batgirl, Coyote vs. Acme and Scoob! Holiday Haunt. Zaslav also received backlash for the removal of many titles from HBO Max and other digital platforms, including Final Space, Tig n' Seek, Elliott from Earth, The Nevers, Infinity Train, Summer Camp Island, The Fungies!, Close Enough, Westworld, The Not-Too-Late Show with Elmo, most Cartoon Network and Adult Swim titles, all of HBO Max's previously available Looney Tunes and Merrie Melodies shorts, and nearly 200 episodes of Sesame Street. Infinity Train creator Owen Dennis remarked that many of these programs were now effectively "lost media".

As head of Warner Bros. Discovery, Zaslav appointed Chris Licht as CEO of CNN in 2022. With Zaslav's support, Licht implemented changes at CNN that sought to shift to a "journalism first" focus. In August 2023, Zaslav appointed Mark Thompson, former president and CEO of The New York Times and former Director General at the BBC, as the new CNN chief.

During the 2023 Hollywood labor disputes, David Zaslav said that Warner Bros. Discovery and other Hollywood studios were "not glad" that the WGA and SAG-AFTRA strikes had occurred and that the company was working to resolve the strike and compensate writers and actors fairly. According to the WGA and SAG-AFTRA, the demands of their workers would cost WBD an estimated $47 million. In September 2023, WBD estimated that the strike caused losses of $300 million–$500 million for the company.

In February 2024, a group of US congressmen sent a letter to Zaslav criticizing World's Ultimate Frontier, a joint production between Discovery and Chinese state media outlet China Global Television Network (CGTN), for "whitewashing genocide" of the Uyghurs in Xinjiang. They called on Discovery to "suspend this partnership with CGTN immediately and to abstain from entering into any similar partnership with any other agent of CCP influence."

Zaslav partnered with Disney CEO Bob Iger and Fox CEO Lachlan Murdoch in a joint venture to create a sports streaming service, named Venu Sports, that would be run by former Apple executive Pete Distad. The service was originally expected to launch in the fall of 2024, but was ultimately cancelled.

In June 2025, Warner Bros. Discovery announced that it would separate into two distinct public companies, Streaming & Studios and Global Networks. The decision was made to provide both entities with stronger focus and strategic flexibility to better compete in the “evolving media landscape.” However, in February 2026, following a bidding war against Netflix, Paramount Skydance announced their intent to acquire Warner Bros. Discovery for $110 billion. On April 23, 2026, Warner Bros. Discovery's shareholders would approve the sale of the company to Paramount Skydance, but rejected an offer to have the Warner Bros. Discovery sale include a golden parachute for Zaslav. Regulatory approvals were completed by September 30, 2026, and after receiving the golden parachute worth $550 million, Zaslav departed from the company upon the acquisition's closure on October 6, 2026.

=== Boards and other activities ===
Zaslav serves on the boards of SiriusXM, American Cinematheque, Grupo Televisa, and Syracuse University. He also is a member of the board of trustees for the Paley Center for Media. Syracuse University and is on the Board of Overseers for NYU Langone Health. He is a member of the Executive Branch of the Academy of Motion Picture Arts and Sciences and is also a member of the Television Academy.

In 2012, he received the Steven J. Ross Humanitarian Award from the United Jewish Appeal Federation (UJA) of New York which honors people of vision, energy and sustained achievement in the entertainment, media and communications industries. In 2014, Zaslav was awarded the Fred Dressler Leadership Award by Syracuse University's S. I. Newhouse School of Public Communications. In September 2016, Zaslav was awarded the Susan Newhouse & SI Newhouse Award of Hope for his support of the Association for Frontotemporal Degeneration (AFTD).

In 2017, Zaslav was inducted into the Cable Hall of Fame and is a member of the Cable TV Pioneers Class of 2018. In 2022, he was named one of Time's 100 Most Influential People.

== Personal life ==
Zaslav lives in New York City with his wife Pam and their three children. His daughter, Ali, is a congressional producer with CNN. He enjoys playing golf and played in the AT&T Pebble Beach Pro-Am in 2017, 2020, and 2022.

During the 2020 election cycle, Zaslav donated over $240,000 to Democratic politicians and PACs, as well as $5,600 to Republican senator Jim Risch.
