= Are You Smarter than a 5th Grader? (Chinese game show) =

Chinese television game show

The Chinese version of Are You Smarter than a 5th Grader? began in 2007 as the project of at least six television stations: Hunan Economic TV Station, China Central Television, Shenzhen TV, Tianjin Television, China Shaanxi TV Station and Guangdong TV.

== 5th Grade Rescue Team ==
Are You Smarter than a 5th Grader?
- Chinese: 五年级救助队
- Starring: Wang Han / Michael Ma
- Country of origin: China

Original release
- Network: HNETV
- Release: May 1, 2007 – September 2007

5th Grade Rescue Team (Simplified Chinese: 五年级救助队) is produced by Hunan Economic TV Station for 7 consecutive days during the "Golden Week" started from the Labour Day in 2007. The host was Wang Han (汪涵). The tagline of the show is "谁比5年级学生更聪明" (who is smarter than a 5th grader?). The top prize is 100,000 Renminbi (about US$14,600). The three "cheats" are "偷看" (peek), "抄袭" (copy) and "拯救" (save). After the "Golden Week", the show continues but aired only once a week. Since September 2007, the host was Michael Ma (马可) instead of Wang Han.

Around the National Day in the same year, the show changed its format (except for the set and the logo design). The name was Intelligent Family Rescue Team (Simplified Chinese: 智慧家庭救助队) instead, taglined "谁是湖南最智慧的家庭" (which is the most intelligent family in Hunan?). In each episode, there were four families participate in the game. First, they answer a question, the family that gets it right by using the least time will be the contestants for the 100,000 Renminbi prize. Then the contestant family answers 11 question with the same values as 5th Grade Rescue Team (see the table below). The other families also need to answer the questions since the family that get the most questions right will be the next contestants. The contestant family can get help from the other families or change the question by using different "lifelines".

Question Values
11	¥100,000		
5	¥5,000	10	¥50,000
4	¥4,000	9	¥25,000
3	¥3,000	8	¥20,000
2	¥2,000	7	¥15,000
1	¥1,000	6	¥10,000

On July 12, 2008, HNETV produced the show's summer special, called 智慧家庭HIGH一夏 (roughly translated as "intelligent families are excited throughout the summer") and ended on September 27, 2008.

== Lucky 52 ==
Lucky 52 (Simplified Chinese: 幸运52) is a variety show of CCTV-2, hosted by Li Yong. The format of Are You Smarter than a 5th Grader? was adapted for the episodes from June 1, 2007 to February 17, 2008. See Lucky Classroom.

== Who's Smarter ==
Are You Smarter than a 5th Grader?
- Chinese: 谁比谁聪明
- Starring: Liu Mingming
- Country of origin: China

Production
- Running time: 40 minute per episode

Original release
- Network: Shenzhen TV
- Release: June 1, 2007

Who's Smarter (Simplified Chinese: 谁比谁聪明) is produced by Shenzhen TV and hosted by Liu Mingming (刘茗茗). The top prize is 20,000 Renminbi (about US$2,900). The "cheats" are "参考" (peek) and "照搬" (copy). The contestant can also phone a friend for help. After the contestant answers the fifth question correctly, he/she can get a certificate for his/her good performance.

Question Values
5	¥4,500	10	¥20,000
4	¥3,000	9	¥12,000
3	¥1,500	8	¥10,000
2	¥1,000	7	¥8,000
1	¥500	6	¥6,000

== Can You Graduate? ==
Are You Smarter than a 5th Grader?
- Chinese: 你能毕业吗?
- Starring: Duan Lei, Jia Ning
- Country of origin: China

Production
- Running time: about 50 minute per episode

Original release
- Network: TJTV
- Release: June 2, 2007

Can You Graduate? (Simplified Chinese: 你能毕业吗?) is produced by Tianjin Television and hosted by Duan Lei (段雷) and Jia Ning (贾宁). The top prize is 10,000 Renminbi (about US$1,460). The contestant can win 5,000 Renminbi if he/she answers all 12 questions correctly, these questions consist of 6 primary school level, 3 junior secondary school level and 3 senior secondary school level questions. An extra 5,000 Renminbi prize will be awarded if he/she get the bonus question right. The contestant can get help from 7 helpers consist of 3 primary school, 2 middle school and 2 high school students by using "cheats": "参考" (peek), "复制" (copy) and "复活" (save).

The rules changed since the new edition premiered on February 3, 2008. Three teams of contestants, each consist of an adult and 4 primary school students, play for 3 rounds. The "fund of love" (爱心基金) accumulates as they are playing. The adult of the winning team of round 3 can play the last round. He/she needs to answer 5 primary school level questions. If he/she answers incorrectly on any question, he/she can continue the game if more than half of the 12 students get it right. The "fund of love" will be doubled if all 5 questions are answered correctly.

== Are You Smarter than a Primary Student? ==
Are You Smarter than a 5th Grader?
- Chinese: 不考不知道
- Starring: Xu Rui
- Country of origin: China

Original release
- Network: SXTVS
- Release: June 30, 2007

Are You Smarter than a Primary Student? (Simplified Chinese: 不考不知道) is produced by China Shaanxi TV Station and hosted by Xu Rui (徐睿). The question values are in experience points, the more points the contestant gets, the more valuable prize he/she wins. The prize for the contestant who gets the maximum 100,000 points is a car manufactured by Chang'an Motors.

There are three "cards" for the contestant to get help from the primary school students: "瞄瞄卡" (peek), "换换卡" (copy) and "救救卡" (save).

Question Values
11	100,000		
5	2,000	10	50,000
4	1,000	9	30,000
3	500	8	20,000
2	300	7	10,000
1	100	6	5,000

== New 5th Grader ==
Are You Smarter than a 5th Grader?
- Chinese: 五年级插班生
- Starring: He Haopeng
- Country of origin: China
- No. of episodes: 171

Production
- Running time: 45 minute per episode

Original release
- Network: GDTV
- Release: August 10, 2007 – February 28, 2009

New 5th Grader (Simplified Chinese: 五年级插班生) is produced by Guangdong TV. The host is He Haopeng (何浩鹏). The top prize is 100,000 Renminbi (about US$14,600). The three "cheats" are "出猫" (peek), "开卷" (copy) and "补考" (save).

The show ended on February 28, 2009 and replaced by Power of 10 (also hosted by He Haopeng) on the next day.

=== Smart Family and Asian Games Genius series ===
Are You Smarter than a 5th Grader?
- Chinese: 五年级插班生之智叻家庭
- Starring: Song Jiaqi
- Country of origin: China
- No. of episodes: 26

Production
- Running time: about 1 hour per episode

Original release
- Network: GDTV
- Release: October 31, 2009 – April 24, 2010

Are You Smarter than a 5th Grader?
- Chinese: 五年级插班生之亚运至叻星
- Starring: He Haopeng
- Country of origin: China
- No. of episodes: 8

Production
- Running time: about 1 hour per episode

Original release
- Network: GDTV
- Release: May 1, 2010

The second series of the show, called New 5th Grader: Smart Family (Simplified Chinese: 五年级插班生之智叻家庭), was premiered on October 31, 2009 and the host is Song Jiaqi (宋嘉其). The top prize is 50,000 Renminbi (about US$7,300). Four families participate in the game in each episode. The families answer a question first, the family that gets it right will be the contestants for the 50,000 Renminbi prize. The contestant can use the three "lifelines" during the game:

- 使D先 (cost a little first): the family don't have to answer the question and go to the next one, but the difference between the values of these two questions will be deducted from the final winning.
- 睇睇先 (look first): the answer of the other three families will be shown for reference.
- 唔答先 (don't answer first): the family can replace the question by a new one, one of the audience will answer the question that was just replaced.

The third series called New 5th Grader: Asian Games Genius (Simplified Chinese: 五年级插班生之亚运至叻星) started on May 1, 2010 and He Haopeng is back as the host. The three "cheats" are "中场休息" (peek), "技术支援" (copy) and "亲友啦啦队" (Phone a Friend).

Question Values (1st and 3rd series)
11	¥100,000		
5	¥3,000	10	¥50,000
4	¥1,500	9	¥25,000
3	¥1,000	8	¥15,000
2	¥500	7	¥8,000
1	¥200	6	¥5,000

Question Values (2nd series)
5	¥3,000	10	¥50,000
4	¥1,500	9	¥25,000
3	¥1,000	8	¥15,000
2	¥500	7	¥8,000
1	¥200	6	¥5,000
