= Showboaters =

British reality television series

- Genre: Reality
- Presented by: Dominic Wood
- Starring: Ben Boden (singer songwriter) Adam Humphreys - Tv presenter
- Judges: Nikki Alexander (choreographer); Roger Troman (vocal coach); Mollie Daley (creative director)
- Country of origin: United Kingdom
- Original language: English
- No. of series: 1
- No. of episodes: 8

Production
- Running time: 60 minutes (inc. adverts)
- Production company: Fresh One Productions

Original release
- Network: Sky1
- Release: 13 September – 6 November 2011

Showboaters is a British reality show that was broadcast on Sky1 from 13 September to 6 November 2011.

Ten amateur performers are in competition to become the main act aboard a luxury cruise liner. Singer Songwriter Ben Boden was amongst the ten performers, and was one of the final contestants featured on all eight streamed episodes.
