= On Safari (2000 game show) =

- Genre: Children's Game show
- Presented by: Richard McCourt
- Country of origin: United Kingdom
- Original language: English
- No. of series: 1
- No. of episodes: 7

Production
- Running time: 25 minutes
- Production company: Scottish Television

Original release
- Network: ITV
- Release: 21 July – 1 September 2000

On Safari is a British children's game show that aired on ITV from 21 July to 1 September 2000 and is hosted by Richard McCourt.

== Format ==
The show featured two teams of two children taking part in a series of challenges and tasks within a safari park, including animal-care and physical skill challenges. The winning team took part in an endgame to win a prize (usually a trip to go on safari in Africa).
