= Dick vs Dom =

Live comedy show

Dick v Dom
- Genre: Comedy; Entertainment; Gameshow
- Date of premiere: February 2014
- Final show: Present
- Location: United Kingdom

Creative team
- Starring: Dick and Dom
- Writers: Dick and Dom
- Executive Producers: Butlins, James Grant Media Group, Dick and Dom

Other information
- No. of shows: 200 +
- Related Shows: Dick & Dom in da Bungalow
- Running time: 45–60 minutes
- Official website

Dick vs Dom is a live comedy entertainment stage show devised by Dick and Dom. The show was originally created for Butlins holiday resorts. They headlined the 2014, 2016, and 2020 seasons. (2020 was cut short due to COVID-19)

On 29 December 2016, it was announced via Dick and Dom's official Twitter account that Dick vs Dom would go on its first full UK tour in 2017. On 31 January 2017, the full details of the tour were announced via Dick and Dom's official Twitter account and the Dick and Dom official website, The tour began on 10 April 2017, and end on 29 October 2017, and ran for 22 shows.

In 2018, they performed to sell-out audiences and received 5-star reviews at the Edinburgh Festival. They also won the BroadwayWorld Best family show award. The show was also performed as a 'late night' version for a Millennial audience which was also a sell-out.

In 2019, the show headline the May half term at Eden Project in Cornwall. The show was such a success that queues formed and there were traffic jams in the St Austell area. In 2019, they also embarked on a tour with P&O Cruises.

Dick and Dom have taken the festival version of the show to many family festivals including Camp Bestival, The Big Feastival, CarFest, The Great Wonderfest, Jimmy's Festival, Chalfest, Wychwood, Standon Calling, Hay Festival and BST in Hyde Park. At festivals, they either perform Dick vs Dom, host the main stage or DJ in the Silent Disco or on the main stage with their new spin-off show Dick vs Dom DJ Battle.

== Tour overview ==
Tours	Number of shows	Opening Date	Closing Date
Butlins 2014	80	February 2014	October 2014
Butlins 2016^{2}	38	April 2016	October 2016
Dick v Dom UK tour	22	April 2017	October 2017
Edinburgh Festival Fringe	15	August 2018	August 2018
Eden Project	15	May 2019	May 2019
Butlins 2020	14	February 2020	(Cancelled due to COVID-19)

^2 Due to popular demand at Butlins, Dick and Dom did two shows per holiday doubling the shows from 19 to 38, one in the afternoon and one in the evening, allowing more people to watch the show since Centre Stage can only hold 3000 people.

== Games/ Items ==
This is a list of games/items from Dick vs Dom.

Title	Points	Description	Year
My Bogies Lie Over the Ocean	1 point	Song with hand and arm actions for the whole audience to take part in	2014–present
Fresh Punch	1 Point	One Dad from each team play this game on stage, add ingredients into a blender wearing boxing gloves and then down a pint of it	2015–present
Crowd Surf	1 Point	Two life-sized dolls are thrown out into the audience – one for each team –which then has to be passed to the rear of the room and back again before the other team does the same thing. On the UK festival tours giant blow-up 7-inch beach balls are used instead	2014–present
Bag Lady	1 Point	One Mum from each team plays this game. Each Mum has an oversized bag placed over them and is wearing boxing gloves; the first one to break free in the time limit of 45 seconds wins	2015–present
Roody song	1 point	Dick and Dom sit down on the stage where they begin to teach new words to the audience from their book, which leads into a song about words they've made up	2015–present
Vent Mask	1 point	In this game, Dick and Dom get one Dad up from each team and proceed to ask the father multiple questions. The Dad is wearing a mask hiding their mouth and Dick and Dom answer their own questions for him is a humorous voice. It ends with the Dad having to perform the YMCA	2016–present
Musical Splatues	1 point	Six children join Dick and Dom on stage to play a game much like musical statues but, when the music stops, the first person caught moving will receive a pie in the face and sent out. Usually, a pie fight ensues between the final three contestants, under the ruling that Dick and Dom "can't figure out who will win".	2014–present
Nellie the Elephant	N/A	Dick and Dom perform their own 'rock' version of the 'Nellie the Elephant' song	2014–present
