= Are You Smarter than a 10 Year Old? (New Zealand game show) =

New Zealand game show

- Directed by: Don Weiner
- Presented by: Dominic Bowden
- Country of origin: New Zealand
- No. of series: 1
- No. of episodes: 14

Production
- Producer: Tony Holden
- Running time: 60 minutes
- Production company: Eyeworks Touchdown

Original release
- Network: TV2
- Release: 9 September – 25 November 2007

Are You Smarter than a 10 Year Old? is a New Zealand game show hosted by Dominic Bowden. It was produced for broadcast on TV2 by Eyeworks Touchdown, based on the American game show Are You Smarter than a 5th Grader?. The first series premiered on 11 September 2007.

== Gameplay ==
Question	Value
1	$1,000
2	$2,000
3	$5,000
4	$7,000
5	$10,000
6	$15,000
7	$20,000
8	$30,000
9	$40,000
10	$50,000
11	$100,000

In each game, the contestant (an adult) is asked a series of eleven questions, spanning ten subjects (such as Human Sciences, Maths or Literacy) taken from textbooks for year 2 through year 6 students. Each question is associated with a year level; there are one or two questions per year level, from year 2 to year 6. Five schoolchildren appear on each show and play along on stage – prior to the show, the children are provided with workbooks which contain a variety of material, some of which could be used in the questions asked in the game.

The player can answer the questions in any order, and each correct answer raises their cumulative amount of winnings to the next level (see table at right); after answering the fifth question correctly, they are guaranteed to leave with at least $10,000. If the player correctly answers the first ten questions, they are given the opportunity to answer a fifth-grade bonus question worth $100,000.

The player chooses one to be their "classmate", who stands at the adjacent podium and is called upon for assistance in choosing a subject; the other four sit at desks off to the side. Each child act as the classmate for at most two questions (done consecutively), after which another child is picked from those who have not yet played in that game.

Contestants have three forms of assistance (two cheats and a save) each available for use once per game (up to, but not including, the $100,000 question).

- Peek: The contestant is shown their classmate's answer and may choose whether to go along with it or not, however, they must answer the question upon using this cheat.
- Copy: The contestant is locked into using their classmate's answer, without being able to see it first.
- Save: If the player answers incorrectly but their classmate is correct, they are credited with a correct answer. This is used automatically on the contestant's first incorrect response.

Once all three forms of assistance are used, the children no longer play an active role in the game.

The rules change slightly for the final question. The player is only shown the subject of the question before deciding if they will continue or drop out. However, if they choose to see the question, they are no longer eligible to drop out and must answer the question, with no assistance from the classmates. A wrong answer on the question will cause the contestant to drop back down to $10,000.

It is of note that 3 people (including Rob Harte on the celebrity special) got to this point, but have never attempted the question. The subject was "Year 6 NZ Heritage" every time.

If the contestant gets an answer wrong (and is not saved), they flunk out, and lose all of their winnings (or drop to $10,000, if they had surpassed the fifth question). As well, they may choose to drop out at any point during the game, which entitles them to leave the game with any winnings they have accumulated.

If, at any point during the game, the player chooses to drop out or is flunked out, they must face the camera and state, "I am not smarter than a 10-year-old." This then ends the show.

== Celebrity Christmas Special ==
This was a special featuring well-known New Zealand icons to donate money to charities.

=== Celebrity List ===
- John Cocks - A celebrity builder on "My House, My Castle"
- Rob Harte - Presenter and legal consultant on "My House, My Castle", having earned a law degree.
- David Wikaira-Paul
