= Geoff Wolinetz =

Geoff Wolinetz is a writer and co-founder of Yankee Pot Roast, an online magazine devoted to literary and pop-culture satire. A 1998 graduate of Binghamton University, Wolinetz has written for several online publications including McSweeney's Internet Tendency, the Black Table, Flak Magazine and the now-defunct Haypenny. In addition to his writing, Wolinetz also works at FreeWheel, as Vice President of Client Relationships. He previously worked at Turner Broadcasting Sales, Inc as Vice President of Entertainment Digital Ad Operations.

He had a short tenure as a contributing editor with Cracked magazine in 2005–06.

His first book, Underrated: The Yankee Pot Roast Guide To Awesome Underappreciated Stuff (co-written with Nick Jezarian and Josh Abraham, ISBN 0806528702), was published by Kensington/Citadel in June 2008.

On November 3, 2009, Wolinetz became the first contestant in the history of either version (primetime or syndicated) of Are You Smarter Than a 5th Grader? to answer all 11 questions correctly without using any of the game's "cheats."

On March 18, 2025, Wolinetz founded JPEG Consulting, a specialized firm focused on media business ventures, data and technology, and strategic growth initiatives.
