= Dick and Dom =

British comedy double act

- Dick and Dom in 2023
- Notable work: Dick & Dom in da Bungalow (2002–2006); Radio 1 (2007–2008); Spamalot West End (2013); Absolute Genius with Dick and Dom (2013–2016); Virgin Radio UK (2024–2025)

Comedy career
- Years active: 1996–present
- Medium: DJ, radio, television, theatre
- Genre: Entertainment
- Members: Richard McCourt; Dominic Wood

Dick and Dom (originally Richard and Dominic) are a British comedy double act consisting of the presenters Richard "Dick" McCourt and Dominic "Dom" Wood.

They are primarily known for presenting the "broom cupboard" presentation links on Children's BBC in the 1990s and early 2000s, before moving on to the double British Academy Children's Award-winning Dick & Dom in da Bungalow, a children's entertainment show that was broadcast live during weekend mornings on BBC One, CBBC, and later BBC Two. The show ran for five series between 2002 and 2006.

== Filmography ==
=== Television ===
Year	Title	Role	Notes
1996–2000	"Broom Cupboard" presentation links	Presenters	
2001–2003	Bring It On	Presenters	
2002–2006	Dick & Dom in da Bungalow	Presenters	
2007–2009	Are You Smarter than a 10 Year Old?	Presenters	Daytime presenters
2009	Da Dick and Dom Dairies	Presenters	
2009–2011	The Legend of Dick and Dom	Dick and Dom	
2011	Dick and Dom's Funny Business	Presenters	
2011–2012	Dick and Dom Go Wild	Presenters	
2011–2013	Splatalot!	Themselves	United Kingdom presenters
2011–2013	Bananas in Pyjamas	B1 and B2	
2012	Dick and Dom's Hoopla	Presenters	
2012–2014	Diddy Movies	Diddy Dick and Dom	
2013	Blue Peter: You Decide	Presenters	
2013–2016	Absolute Genius with Dick and Dom	Presenters	
2016–2018	Diddy TV	Diddy Dick and Dom	

=== Film ===
Year	Title	Role	Notes
2011	Horrid Henry: The Movie	Presenters of "2 Cool 4 School"	
2016	Asterix: The Mansions of the Gods	Unhygienix and Fulliautomatix	British release

=== Radio/Podcasts ===
Year	Show	Role
2007	BBC Radio 1	The Lie In Sunday Morning show
2019	Diddy Pod	Diddy Dick and Dom
2019	Cash from Chaos	Presenters
2020	The Dick and Dom Debate	Themselves
2024	Virgin Radio UK	Sat & Sun weekend afternoons

== Theatre/Festivals/DJ gigs ==
In 2013, the duo debuted in the West End playing King Arthur (Dick) and Patsy (Dom) in Spamalot. The production's opening night was in December, and its initial 6 week run was extended to 10 weeks.

Dick vs Dom also known as "Dick and Dom LIVE" was a live 60-minute gameshow which involved the whole audience. The stage show originated at Butlins where they headlined with Dick vs Dom in 2014 and 2016. The show also toured UK theatres and Family Festivals.

Dick vs Dom went on its first full UK tour in 2017 The tour began on 10 April 2017 and ended on 29 October 2017, running for 22 shows. In 2018, they took Dick vs Dom to the Edinburgh Festival as part of Underbelly and received five-star reviews. In May 2019, they performed Dick vs Dom at the Eden Project in Cornwall and onboard P&O Cruises.

Since the naughties, Dick and Dom have been DJs, performing initially in smaller venues like student unions. Since then they have appeared at many festivals including the Silverstone GP, Download, Boomtown, Camp Bestival, The Big Feastival, Kendal Calling, Beat Hurder, CarFest, Glastonbury, Chalfest, Wychwood, Standon Calling, Hay Festival, Gone Wild Festival, Camper Calling and BST in Hyde Park. At festivals, they have performed Dick vs Dom, hosted the main stage, and DJ'd with a spin off show Dick vs Dom DJ Battle. Their new DJ show Dick & Dom in Da Naughties launched in 2024. As of 2026 their sets vary from house and techno to drum and bass nights.

=== Tour overview ===
Tours	Number of shows	Opening date	Closing date
Butlins 2014	65	February 2014	October 2014
Festival shows UK	N/A	30 July 2011 –	Present
Butlins 2016	38	8 April 2016	28 October 2016
Dick vs Dom 2017 UK tour	22	10 April 2017	29 October 2017
Butlins 2018	17	May 2018	October 2018
Edinburgh 2018	12	1 August 2018	12 August 2018
Eden Project 2019	7	25 May 2019	1 June 2019
P&O Cruise 2019	6	7 April 2019	20 August 2019
Dick & Dom In Da Bungalow: LIVE!	22	11 March 2023	14 May 2023

== Awards and nominations ==
Year	Award	Category	Nominated work	Result
2004	British Academy Children's Awards	Presenter	Dick & Dom in da Bungalow	Won
2005	British Academy Children's Awards	Presenter	Dick & Dom in da Bungalow	Nominated
2014	British Academy Children's Awards	Presenter	Absolute Genius with Dick and Dom	Won
