= Dominic Wood =

English magician and presenter (born 1978)

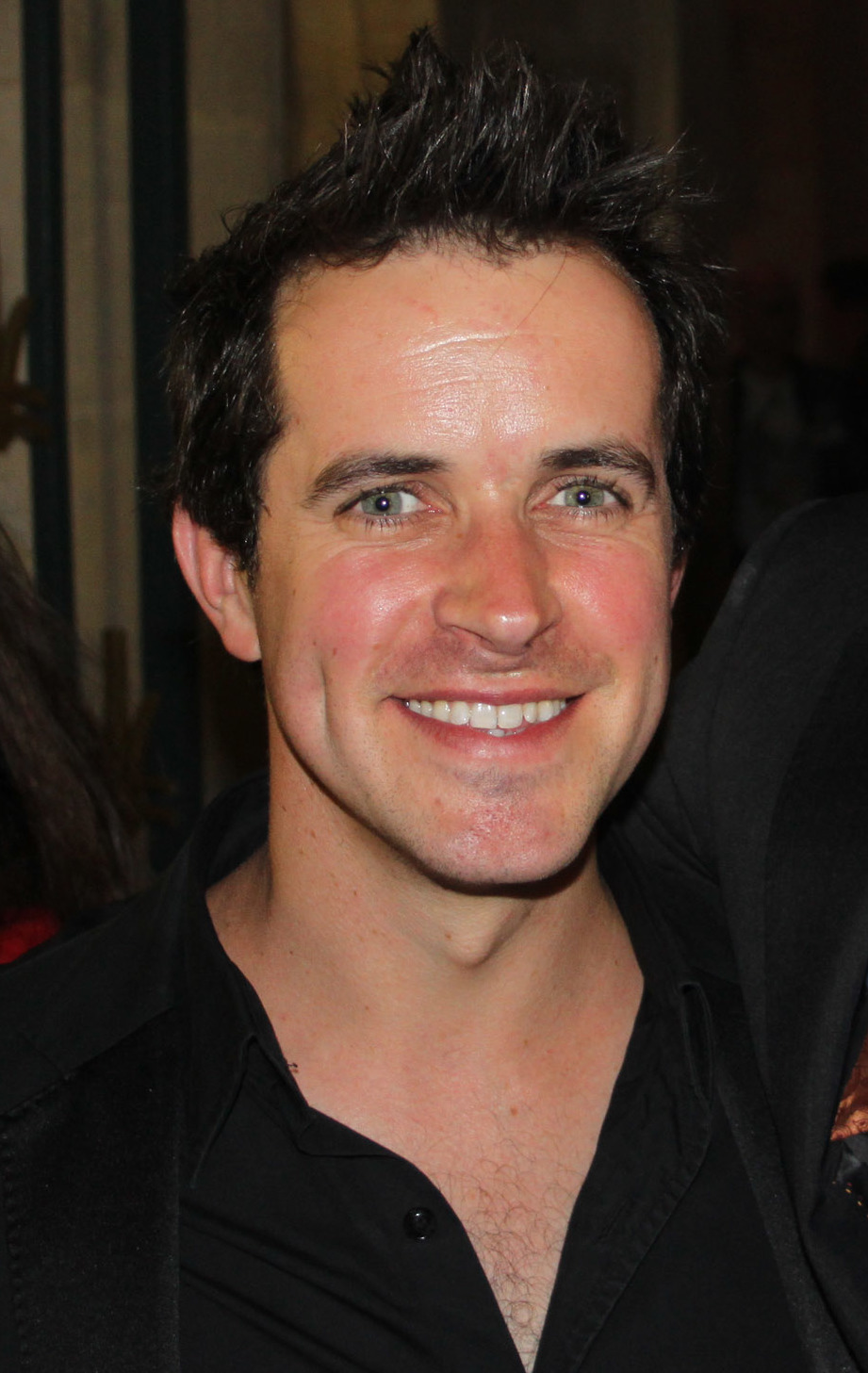
- Wood in 2012
- Born: Dominic Simon Wood; 3 January 1978 (age 48); Exeter, Devon, England
- Occupations: Entertainer; magician; presenter; DJ
- Years active: 1996–present
- Known for: Dick and Dom
- Spouse: Sandi Lee Hughes (m. 2005)
- Children: 2

Dominic Simon "Dom" Wood (born 3 January 1978) is an English entertainer, magician, TV presenter and DJ. He is best known as one half of the double act Dick and Dom with Richard "Dick" McCourt, with whom he was won two British Academy Children's Awards for the shows Dick & Dom in da Bungalow and Absolute Genius with Dick and Dom.

== Career ==
=== Media ===
As a child, Wood was part of the National Youth Music Theatre, which led him to his TV debut on CBBC's Friday Zone in 1996. He would go on to become a presenter on the CBBC strand in 1998, where he first worked with Richard McCourt. The two later became known as "Dick and Dom" and regularly appeared on CBBC together until 2018.

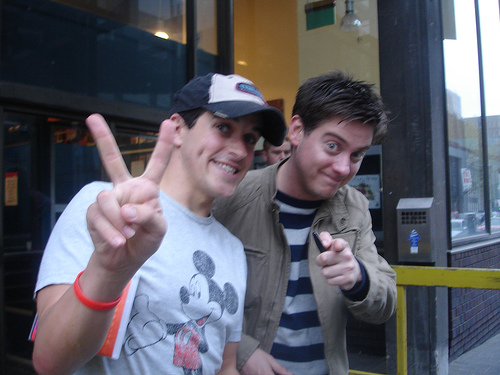
Dick and Dom in 2006

From 14 October 2007 to September 2008, he and McCourt presented the Sunday morning show on BBC Radio 1 from 10:00 am – 1:00 pm, but later left the show due to TV commitments. The duo later became on-air hosts of Virgin Radio UK on Saturday and Sunday afternoons.

On his own, Wood presented The Animal Magic Show from 1998 to 2001; the CITV game show Jungle Run in 1999; Brainiac's Test Tube Baby, the companion show to Brainiac: Science Abuse, in 2006; Comic Relief Does Fame Academy on BBC Three in 2007; and was the narrator for the Sky One reality show Showboaters in 2011. In 2021, Wood began his own DIY channel on social media platform TikTok, which has amassed more than 200,000 followers.

=== Magic ===
Wood was at one point the youngest member of the magician's society The Magic Circle. He was however later expelled in the wake of disapproval over Dick & Dom in da Bungalow, on which he would occasionally perform and reveal tricks, despite him protesting that other entertainers and magicians had effectively done the same publicly before with no blowback.

His magical achievements and awards include:

- 1999: Escaping from a straitjacket on Houdini's birthday
- 1998: British Magical Champion
- 1998: World Record for Card Tricks
- 1996: IBM Shield for Sleight of Hand
- 1994: Young Magician of the Year

=== Author ===
Wood has co-written several books, including:

- Wood, Dominic (2004). Dominic and the Magic Topper. ISBN 0-552-55157-0.
- Wood, Dominic (October 2004). Dominic Wood's Mini Magic: Party Tricks. Red Fox. ISBN 0-09-945137-9.
- Wood, Dominic (2004). Dominic Wood's Mini Magic: Playground Pranks. Red Fox. ISBN 0-09-945138-7.
- Dominic Wood's Magic Book ISBN 0-09-944767-3
- Dominic Wood's Spooky Magic ISBN 0-370-32766-7
- Wood, Dominic (2002). Dominic Wood's Magic Book. Bodley Head. ISBN 0-370-32756-X.
- Wood, Dominic (2001). Simply Magic. Random House Children's Books. ISBN 0-09-941396-5.

== Personal life ==
Wood married Sandi Lee Hughes of the pop band allSTARS*, which disbanded in 2002, and the couple have two sons, Tommy and Sam. McCourt is also the godfather of both children. He has an older brother Jim who appeared on an episode of Dick and Dom in da Bungalow, and two other brothers, Matt and Tim.

Wood is a vegan and has been diagnosed as dyslexic. Wood ran the annual charity event the Great North Run for the first time in 2007. He attended the Hylton and Exeter Cathedral schools, with Chris Martin of Coldplay.
