= Are You Smarter than a 5th Grader? (American game show) =

American television game show

- Logo for the 2019 revival
- Genre: Game show
- Created by: Mark Burnett; Barry Poznick; John Stevens
- Written by: Seth Harrington; Evie Peck; Ann Slicher; Peter Scott
- Directed by: Don Weiner
- Presented by: Jeff Foxworthy; John Cena
- Announcer: Mark Thompson; John Cena
- Theme music composer: David Vanacore (Vanacore Music) with; Blessed Kateri Children's Choir
- Country of origin: United States
- Original language: English
- No. of seasons: 4 (Fox); 2 (Syndication); 1 (Nickelodeon)
- No. of episodes: 103 (Fox); 310 (Syndication); 20 (Nickelodeon)

Production
- Executive producers: Mark Burnett; Barry Poznick; Roy Bank (2007–10); John Stevens (2007–11); Jeff Foxworthy (2015); John Cena (2019); Steve Hughes (2019); Sean Kelly (2019)
- Producer: Jeff Foxworthy
- Production locations: CBS Studio Center; Studio City, California (2007); Manhattan Beach Studios; Manhattan Beach, California (2007–08); CBS Television City; Hollywood, California (2008–09, 2015); Hollywood Center Studios; Hollywood, California (2009–10); Sony Pictures Studios; Culver City, California (2010–11); Universal Studios Lot; Universal City, California (2019)
- Running time: 44 mins (Fox); 22–26 mins (Syndication); 22–25 mins (Nickelodeon)
- Production companies: Mark Burnett Productions (2007–11); Zoo Productions (2007–11); United Artists Media Group (2015); MGM Television (2019); Hard Nocks South Productions (2019); Nickelodeon Productions (2019)

Original release
- Network: Fox
- Release: February 27, 2007 – September 18, 2009
- Release: May 26 – September 8, 2015
- Network: Syndication
- Release: September 21, 2009 – March 24, 2011
- Network: Nickelodeon
- Release: June 10 – November 3, 2019

Are You Smarter than a 5th Grader? is an American quiz game show. It originally aired on Fox where it was hosted by Jeff Foxworthy. It is produced by Mark Burnett. The show premiered as a three-day special which began on February 27, 2007, with the first two shows each a half-hour in length. Regular one-hour episodes began airing Thursdays from March 1 through May 10, and the first season continued with new episodes beginning May 31. Are You Smarter than a 5th Grader? was picked up for the 2007–08 season, which began on September 6, 2007, and aired in the same timeslot. Following the end of the original run of the primetime version on September 18, 2009, a first-run syndicated version of the show ran from September 2009 to May 2011, with Foxworthy returning as host. On May 26, 2015, the program returned to Fox for a new, 4th season, with Foxworthy, again, returning as host. On February 14, 2019, it was announced that the program would be revived on Nickelodeon with new host John Cena, airing from June 10 to November 3, 2019. The show was revived on Amazon Prime Video with new host Travis Kelce in October 2024.

5th Grader games are played by a single contestant, who attempts to answer ten questions (plus a final bonus question). Content is taken from elementary school textbooks, two from each grade level from first to fifth. Each correct answer increases the amount of money the player banks; a maximum cash prize of $1 million can be won on the Fox version, $250,000 in the syndicated version, and $100,000 on the Nickelodeon version. Along the way, contestants can be assisted by a "classmate", one of five school-age cast members, in answering the questions. Notably, upon getting an answer incorrect, deciding to prematurely end the game, or not winning the top prize in later versions, contestants must state that they are "not smarter than a 5th grader".

Two people have won the $1 million prize: Kathy Cox, superintendent of public schools for the U.S. state of Georgia in 2008, when she appeared on the show; and George Smoot, winner of the 2006 Nobel Prize in Physics and professor at the University of California, Berkeley.

Two people have won the $250,000 prize in the syndicated version: Geoff Wolinetz and Elizabeth Miller.

One person has won the $100,000 prize on the Nickelodeon revival: Alfred Guy, a college dean at Yale University.

The show also airs internationally, and the format has been picked up for local versions in a number of other countries.

== Production ==
Logo used for the 2007–2011 series.

Are You Smarter than a 5th Grader? was originally created as a recurring segment on The Howard Stern Show although Stern was given no credit or mention for the TV series. In November 2006 it was pitched as "Do You Remember Grade School?" by Burnett and Zoo Productions to network executives in the form of a six-question quiz; the only network president who was able to win on the quiz was Fox's Peter Liguori. On January 31, 2007, Fox announced that they had picked up the show for an initial six-episode run, and on February 9 Foxworthy was announced as host. Less than eight weeks after being pitched, the first episode aired.

On November 6, 2014, Fox announced it would revive the series, with a new generation of fifth-graders, to its lineup as part of the summer season of the 2014–15 season. The new season features several changes, including a new panel of six regular fifth-grade students (whose usage and seating positions will rotate per episode), a new "Grade School Giveaway" feature on the $10,000 question, in which a school will win $10,000 towards improvements if the contestant answers their $10,000 question correctly, and the million dollar question is now from the sixth grade. Foxworthy explained that the revival was the result of a conversation he had over dinner with Mark Burnett the previous year, in which he considered 5th Grader to be his favorite television role. When Fox approached him later in 2014 about reviving the series, he accepted the role with little hesitation.

== Original and revival versions on Fox ==
=== Gameplay ===
In each game, the contestant (an adult) is presented with a board of ten subjects (such as Animal Science, Spelling or Math) each associated with a grade level from first to fifth, with two questions per grade. Each subject represents a question (either true/false, a three-answered multiple-choice question, or short-answered question) taken from a textbook for students of the associated grade level.

The player can select the subjects in any order. There is no time limit to answer. Contestants lock in their final answers by pressing the button on the podium. Each correct answer raises their total winnings to the next level of the show's money ladder.

Money Ladder

Question	Money won
1	$1,000
2	$2,000
3	$5,000
4	$10,000
5	$25,000 (Guaranteed sum)
6	$50,000
7	$100,000
8	$175,000
9	$300,000
10	$500,000
11	$1,000,000 (Grand prize)

Five fifth graders (some of whom are also professional child actors) appear on each episode and play along on stage – in general, each episode in a season has the same cast of children. Prior to the show, the children are provided with workbooks which contain a variety of material, some of which could be used in the questions asked in the game. The player chooses one to be their "classmate", who stands at the adjacent podium and also answers each question secretly in writing. Each child acts as the classmate for two consecutive questions, after which another child is picked from those who have not yet played in that game. The classmate's main role is to provide assistance to the contestant, called "cheats". Contestants have three cheats available for use once per game:

- Peek: The contestant is shown their classmate's answer, and may use it or give a different one. When this cheat is used, the contestant must answer the question.
- Copy: The contestant is locked into using their classmate's answer, without being able to see it first. The classmate must provide the correct answer in order for the contestant to advance to the next stage. When this cheat is used in the 2015 revival, the classmate is allowed to discuss his/her answer with the other fifth graders and change it if desired.
- Save: When the contestant gets their first question wrong, the "Save" is automatically used. The classmate's answer is revealed, and if it is correct, the contestant is credited with a correct answer for that question. The Save was removed from the syndicated version beginning in Season 2, and does not apply in the Nickelodeon version since wrong answers carry no penalty.
  - A contestant who uses their Peek and is uncertain whether the classmate's answer or a different one is correct could risk their Save (if it is still available) to effectively give both answers. If the contestant gives the answer not given by their classmate, and it is wrong, they can still be saved by the classmate's answer.

Once all three forms of assistance are used or once the tenth question is answered correctly, the classmates take no further active role in the game.

If the contestant gets an answer wrong, they "flunk out", and the game ends. The contestant leaves with nothing unless they have already answered five questions correctly and reached or passed the $25,000 level, in which case they take home that amount.

After a subject is chosen and the question is revealed, the contestant can choose to "drop out" and leave with their winnings earned to that point instead of answering the question (unless they have used their "Peek" on that question in which case they must answer).

If the player correctly answers all ten standard questions from the board, they are given the opportunity to answer a final fifth-grade bonus question (sixth-grade in the 2015 revival) to double their winnings from $500,000 to $1 million (see "Million Dollar Question" below). Unlike the regular questions, the contestant must decide whether to play or "drop out" upon seeing only the subject, and before the actual question is revealed. If they choose to play, they must answer the question. The contestant can not use any cheats on the Million Dollar Question.

==== Classroom Club ====
"Classroom Club" questions were introduced into the game at the beginning of the second season. These questions are written by elementary school students, who submit them via the show's Web site. When one is used, the school of the student who wrote it receives a computer lab, courtesy of the show.

==== Field Trip ====
"Field Trip" questions, introduced in the third season, feature a video clip of a National Geographic Channel correspondent asking the question from an appropriate location somewhere in the world.

==== Grade School Giveaway ====
In the 2015 revival, the $10,000 question also rewarded $10,000 to a grade school (connected to the studio via Skype) towards refurbishments and improvements if the contestant answered correctly.

==== Million Dollar Question ====
A contestant who successfully answered all ten questions was given the subject for an eleventh one, at the fifth-grade level on the original or sixth-grade in the 2015 revival. They had to decide whether to attempt it, or drop out and keep the $500,000 won to that point. If the contestant chose to attempt the final question, they had to answer it with no help from the students and could not drop out. A correct answer increased their winnings total to $1 million, while a miss reduced it to $25,000.

Any contestant who won the $1 million top prize was allowed to face the camera and state, "I am smarter than a 5th grader!" Contestants who dropped out or flunked out at any point in the game had to face the camera and declare, "I am not smarter than a 5th grader."

=== Casting ===
Each season, a new group of children are cast to appear as the "classmates" on the show. Any child cast must be "smart, funny, and outgoing", and must actually be in the 5th grade (age 9, 10 or 11) during the television season finales.

Contestants who make it through the auditioning process are required to sign a one-year contract stating that they will not tell anybody how much money they make, and that they cannot tell or release any information about the actual auditioning process, such as the number of screening processes, the questions asked by the auditioners, and the actual credit for being accepted onto the show.

During every classmate's final appearance on the show ("Graduation Night"), each classmate receives a $25,000 savings bond.

Season	Classmates (Note: The seat numbering for seasons 1-3 represented here starts from the back left of the classroom and goes clockwise from the viewer's perspective. The 2015 revival has six regular kids whose usage and positions at the five desks are rotated for each episode.)						Host
Season	Seat 1	Seat 2	Seat 3	Seat 4	Seat 5	Seat 6	Host
1 (2007)	Laura Marano	Kyle Collier	Jacob Hays	Alana Ethridge	Spencer Martin	—N/a	Jeff Foxworthy
1 (2007)	Marki Ann Meyer (Note: Meyer replaced Marano halfway through Season 1.)	Kyle Collier	Jacob Hays	Alana Ethridge	Spencer Martin	—N/a	Jeff Foxworthy
2 (2007–08)	Cody Lee	Mackenzie Holmes	Sierra McCormick	Nathan Lazarus	Olivia Glowacki	—N/a	Jeff Foxworthy
2 (2007–08)	Cody Lee	Mackenzie Holmes	Sierra McCormick	Nathan Lazarus	Chandler Chaffee (Note: Chaffee subbed Glowacki for two episodes in season 2.)	—N/a	Jeff Foxworthy
3 (2008–09)	Jonathan Cummings	Jenna Balk	Olivia Dellums	Bryce Cass	Francesca DeRosa	—N/a	Jeff Foxworthy
3 (2008–09)	Jonathan Cummings	Jenna Balk	Kassidy Yeung (Note: Yeung filled in for Dellums in one episode of season 3.)	Bryce Cass	Francesca DeRosa	—N/a	Jeff Foxworthy
4 (2015)	Simmons "Tres" Allison III	Reagan Strange	Lauren Bullock	Mason Davis	Dontral "Dee" DuBois	Angela Azar	Jeff Foxworthy

=== Celebrity Are You Smarter than a 5th Grader? ===
Beginning in season 2, many celebrities played the game and donated their winnings to the charity of their choice. Of these celebrities, Nobel Prize winner George Smoot was the most successful celebrity upon becoming the second contestant to win the $1 million top prize. A few other celebrities won $500,000 for their charities, which include Gene Simmons who played for Glazer Pediatrics AIDS Foundation, and former Jeopardy! champion (now host) Ken Jennings, which allowed him to reclaim the record for the most money won on American game shows. (Note: At the time of filming, Jennings held the distinction as the most money won on game shows until Brad Rutter surpassed his record in 2014 after the Jeopardy! Battle of the Decades; however, Jennings reclaimed the record in 2020 after winning Jeopardy! The Greatest of All Time.)

== Syndicated version ==
A half-hour daily syndicated version of the show, also with Foxworthy as host, began airing on September 21, 2009, for season 1, and Season 2 premiered on September 20, 2010. This version features a top prize of $250,000 and a tweaked format between the prime time version and the daytime version.

On March 24, 2011, the show was canceled along with Don't Forget the Lyrics! due to low ratings. Reruns continued on several cable outlets for a year afterward, as well as Light TV until the network dissolved in January 2021.

On the syndicated version, each class had three kids in each episode, but there were nine kids who traded off with one another throughout both seasons. They were, as reflected in the table below:

Class	Season 1	Season 2
Students	Annalise Basso	Terrell "TJ" Burnett
Students	Zach Callison	Antonio Gutierrez
Students	Danielle Cohen	Jordan Jones
Students	Khamani Griffin	Armaan Juneja
Students	Taylar Hender	Madison Leisle
Students	Kevin Hong	Jenni Marer
Students	Pablo Garcia	Ty Panitz
Students	Madison Pettis	Lauren Perez
Students	Malachi Smith	Danielle Soibelman

=== Gameplay ===
Subject	Question Value	
Subject	Season 1	Season 2
Bonus Question	10x multiplier	
5th Grade	$5,000	—N/a
4th Grade	$3,500	$7,500
3rd Grade	$2,500	$3,500
2nd Grade	$1,000	
1st Grade	$500	

The game play for this version of 5th Grader is similar to the original Fox network version. Games are played by a single contestant, who attempts to answer questions correctly plus one final fifth grade bonus question with the assistance of one of three fifth grade classmates (instead of five on the network version), who vary each week. In addition, each classmate can be used for up to three questions (as opposed to two on the network version). Naturally, the question's grade level determines the value and difficulty.

Contestants are required to attempt all questions, and do not flunk out simply by answering a question incorrectly, instead losing all money earned to that point. If a player has any money left after all questions are asked, they are given the choice to either drop out with the money earned, or answer a 5th-grade bonus question worth 10 times their earnings. The maximum winnings are $25,000 without the bonus question, and therefore $250,000 if it is answered correctly.

As in the original version, winning the maximum prize of $250,000 entitled a contestant to confess to a camera that "I am smarter than a 5th grader!"; if the contestant did not win the full $250,000, they instead have to declare the statement: "I am not smarter than a 5th grader."

If the contestant answers the bonus question wrong, they lose everything, but if they had earned at least $2,500 before the bonus question, then they receive a consolation prize in the form of a $2,500 prepaid card. If they had earned less than $2,500, the value of the card is $250. On celebrity episodes, the consolation prizes are cash donations to the celebrity's favorite charity.

In Season 1, there are 10 regular questions before the bonus question. Season 2 shortened the game by reducing the number of questions before the bonus question down to eight while fifth grade questions are removed from the main game. The "Save" was also removed, and contestants were no longer allowed to skip to a higher-grade question before attempting at least one question from each lower grade.

== Nickelodeon version ==
A revival debuted on Nickelodeon on June 10, 2019, hosted by John Cena. The first episode was released as a preview to YouTube by Nickelodeon on June 6, 2019. As in previous versions, the game is played by a single adult contestant. The top prize on this version is $100,000.

The contestant faces a total of 11 questions in his or her game. The first six questions cover first through fourth grade, with one question each for first and second grades, and two questions each for third and fourth grades. Each classmate is allowed to help in one grade level. The contestant is allowed a "Peek" and a "Copy" during the first part of the game. If a contestant gives an incorrect answer, the top prize is lowered; correspondingly, the "Save" is not given in this version. The money grows as follows:

Correct questions	1	2	3	4	5	6
Round 1 Cash Value	$250	$500	$1,000	$2,500	$5,000	$10,000
Fifth Grade Multiplier	x2	x3	x4	x5	x10	—N/a

=== Fifth Grade ===
Once the first part of the game is completed, the contestant faces the fifth grade. Five subjects are shown to the contestant, each with one fifth grade-level question. The contestant is given 60 seconds to answer all five questions. As in the first part of the game, the contestant must press the button on his or her desk to lock in an answer.

To help the contestant, one "final cheat" is allowed, which the contestant can use on any question; the final cheat allows the contestant to discuss that question with the last remaining member of the class (without a stated time limit) after the other four questions have been completed and their answers revealed. Cena does not move on to the next question until the contestant has acted on the current question by either answering, passing, or declaring an intention to use the final cheat. Any passed question will be repeated with the remaining time.

After all of the questions have been answered, or time has expired, the questions that have been answered are reviewed, and the correct answers revealed. If the contestant has used the final cheat, that question is then addressed last after the other four questions have been resolved. The contestant is then allowed to discuss that question with the last remaining classmate. Once the discussion is over, the contestant locks in an answer to that question, and is then told whether the answer is right or wrong.

Each correct answer increases the multiplier by one (for example, two correct answers would be three times the bank; a $10,000 bank worth a total of $30,000); correctly answering all five fifth-grade questions increases the initial bank by ten.

As in the original versions, winning the maximum prize of $100,000 entitled a contestant to confess to a camera that "I am smarter than a 5th grader!"; if the contestant did not win the full $100,000, they instead have to declare the statement: "I am not smarter than a 5th grader."

=== Cast ===
The following is the cast for the Nickelodeon version:

- Chloe Casanova
- Quinne Daniels
- Nick D'Ambrosio
- Patrick D'Amico
- Colin Heintz
- Amira Martin
- Isabella Schmitt
- Cooper Stutler
- Mia Tillman
- Tristan Tucker Jr.
- Jamir Vega
- Saya Watkins

== Amazon Prime version ==
On March 19, 2024, it was announced that Are You Smarter than a 5th Grader? would be revived for Amazon Prime Video, with Kansas City Chiefs tight end Travis Kelce in talks to host the reboot. It was later revealed the show would be titled Are You Smarter than a Celebrity? with a 20-episode season ordered by Amazon Prime Video. It premiered on October 16, 2024, with its first three episodes available that day.

The top prize is $100,000, with the contestant guaranteed at least $15,000 if they have answered the first five questions correctly. Gameplay is similar to the original Fox version; ten subjects from the first to fifth grade, two for each grade, are available for the contestant to answer questions in. If they get through the ten questions, they have a chance at the $100,000 by tackling an additional, sixth grade, question.

Money Ladder

Question	Money won
1	$1,000
2	$2,500
3	$5,000
4	$10,000
5	$15,000 (Guaranteed sum)
6	$20,000
7	$25,000
8	$30,000
9	$35,000
10	$50,000
11	$100,000 (Grand prize)

A contestant flunks out (leaving with either $0 or $15,000) if they answer a question incorrectly and are not saved by the celebrity whom they pick to help them. The Peek and Save cheats carry over from the original and function similarly. An additional cheat—the Pop Quiz cheat—allows the contestant to swap out the school subject question they are trying with a question about pop culture, and all five celebrities can confer to help the contestant on that question. Unlike the original, a contestant may make the decision to drop out only after having answered a question; that option is not available once a new question has been revealed from a subject they select. Also, the contestant can receive help from one of the five celebrities on the $100,000 question.

During the game, one question comes with an extra-credit prize, which the contestant will receive from Amazon Prime if they answer the question correctly.

As in the original versions, any contestant who won the $100,000 top prize was allowed to face the camera and state, "I am smarter than a celebrity!" Contestants who dropped out or flunked out at any point in the game had to face the camera and declare, "I am not smarter than a celebrity."

== Reception ==
=== Critical ===
David Hinckley of the New York Daily News gave the 2015 revival series' cast a positive review, calling the classmates "terrific... smart, outgoing and funny", while arguing that Foxworthy "understands how much to showcase them".

=== Ratings ===
The first season of the original series averaged 11.5 million viewers. The 2015 revival premiered on May 26, 2015, to 3.31 million viewers, scoring a 0.8/3 rating/share among adults 18–49.

=== Awards and nominations ===
Year	Award	Category	Nominee/Episode	Result	Ref.
2008	Young Artist Awards	Best Family Television Reality Show, Game Show or Documentary	Are You Smarter Than a 5th Grader?	Won	
2008	People's Choice Awards	Favorite Game Show	Are You Smarter Than a 5th Grader?	Nominated	
2008	Teen Choice Awards	Choice TV: Game Show	Are You Smarter Than a 5th Grader?	Nominated	
2008	Kids' Choice Awards	Favorite Reality Show	Are You Smarter Than a 5th Grader?	Nominated	
2009	Kids' Choice Awards	Favorite Reality Show	Are You Smarter Than a 5th Grader?	Nominated	
2010	Kids' Choice Awards	Favorite Reality Show	Are You Smarter Than a 5th Grader?	Nominated	
2010	Daytime Emmy Awards	Outstanding Game Show	Are You Smarter Than a 5th Grader?	Nominated	
2020	American Reality Television Awards	Game/Variety Show	Are You Smarter Than a 5th Grader?	Won	
2020	Daytime Emmy Awards	Outstanding Game Show	Are You Smarter Than a 5th Grader?	Nominated	
2020	Writers Guild of America Awards	Quiz and Audience Participation	Bret Calvert, Seth Harrington, Rosemarie DiSalvo	Won	
2020	Kids' Choice Awards	Favorite TV Host	John Cena	Nominated	
