= 2002 in British television =

This is a list of British television related events from 2002.

== Events ==
=== January ===
- 1 January
  - Provisional viewing figures released by the Broadcasters' Audience Research Board indicate that on average, BBC One had more viewers than ITV through 2001. This is the first time this has happened.
  - New Year's Day highlights on BBC One include the films Chitty Chitty Bang Bang, Small Soldiers, Shakespeare in Love and 'Til There Was You.
- 4 January – It is reported that three Coronation Street actors Stephen Beckett (Dr Matt Ramsden), Clare McGlinn (Charlie Ramsden) and Naomi Russell (Bobbi Lewis) are to leave the series in the Spring.
- 7 January
  - The Independent Television Commission rejects 129 viewer complaints about WHSmith's Fat Geordies Christmas advertising campaign, saying the humour was acceptable and would not have caused widespread offence, but the watchdog does express its concerns about the stereotyping of overweight people, suggesting this could be harmful.
  - Sky News content becomes available on terrestrial television for the first time in a decade as Channel 5 begins simulcasting part of the breakfast news programme Sunrise with Sky's news channel.
- 8 January – EastEnders character Angie Watts is set to be killed off-screen from cirrhosis of the liver due to alcoholism. The character was last seen in May 1988 and her death would air in April 2002.
- 11 January – Coronation Street bosses confirm that Jacqueline Chadwyck who plays Linda Sykes has left the series and will not return to film any exit scenes. It is also confirmed that comedian Roy Hudd will join the soap to play a lighthearted character, an undertaker named Archie Shuttleworth.
- 20 January – Bloody Sunday, a television drama based on the events of the controversial Bloody Sunday incident in Northern Ireland in 1972 airs on ITV. The film, and Channel 4's Sunday (airing eight days later and dealing with the same topic), attract several complaints to the Independent Television Commission over their impartiality because of an ongoing inquiry into the incident. But the Commission rules in April that neither film was biased.
- 22 January – UTV2 closes and is replaced by ITV2.
- 23 January – At a meeting of the Scottish Affairs Committee in Westminster, BBC governor Sir Robert Smith tells the committee that the possibility of a Six O'Clock News bulletin for Scotland will be considered again following next year's Scottish Parliament election.
- 24 January – Hear'Say, the band formed by ITV's Popstars, confirm that Kym Marsh has left the group, but say they intend to continue. The following day auditions are announced for a new band member to replace Marsh.
- 25 January – UK Today ends after all of the BBC's regional centres are upgraded for digital broadcasting. However, due to cost considerations, the BBC decides not to create separate regional services for BBC Two in England. Despite this, the weekday afternoon regional bulletin continues on BBC Two and digital viewers see BBC London News rather than their own regional news bulletin.
- 27 January – Sid Owen and Patsy Palmer are reprising their EastEnders roles as Ricky Butcher and Bianca Jackson after filming a one-off special that will air later in the year.
- 28 January – Beginning of a week of EastEnders episodes set in Spain which see the return of the character Sam Mitchell. Sam's return sees actress Kim Medcalf make her television acting debut, having taken over the role from Danniella Westbrook after the part was recast. Medcalf goes on to play Sam until 2005 when the character is written out of the series in a storyline that sees her fleeing to Brazil after becoming a murder suspect. Westbrook then returns to the role of Sam in 2009, before Medcalf once again reprises the role in 2022.
- 29 January – The Sun reports that Cat Deeley will leave SM:TV in March after being offered other projects. ITV subsequently confirms her departure from the programme.
- 30 January – Channel 4's controversial Brass Eye spoof documentary on paedophiles is among the winners at the annual Broadcast Magazine Awards held in London, picking up a comedy award despite causing controversy when it aired the previous year.
- 31 January
  - The BBC children's series Teletubbies has been sold to China where it will be aired on the state owned channel CCTV1.
  - The last titled episode of The Bill, "Set in Stone", is broadcast. This is followed by a six-part untitled story after which the series switches to a serial format.
  - Granada Breeze closes down on both Sky Digital and ITV Digital. The channel continues on cable services NTL and Telewest before shutting down completely in the spring.
- January – BBC Worldwide relaunches its commercially funded website beeb.com as a sponsored shopping guide.

=== February ===
- 1 February – It is reported that The Saturday Show presenter Dani Behr has been reprimanded by her BBC bosses after giving a sexually explicit interview to lads' magazine Maxim.
- 3 February – 3,000 hopefuls travel to London to attend auditions to replace Kym Marsh in Hear'Say. Johnny Shentall is introduced as the band's new member two days later. Fans and the media later dismiss the process as a stunt because Shentall is a former member of the pop group Boom!, accusations that prompt Hear'Say to issue a statement denying it was fixed.
- 7 February – BBC Director-General Greg Dyke launches his "cut the crap, make it happen" initiative, designed to cut red tape and inertia at the corporation.
- 8–22 February – The BBC provides coverage of the 2002 Winter Olympic Games.
- 9 February
  - Following the announcement of the death of Princess Margaret, the younger sister of Elizabeth II, some radio and television schedules are changed to make room for tribute programmes.
  - Will Young wins the first series of Pop Idol.
- 10 February – ITV1 begins airing the fifth and final series of the Michael Barrymore fronted gameshow My Kind of Music. Twelve episodes are recorded, but only five are ultimately shown, as some regions prefer to continue airing their own local programmes within the Sunday early evening slot.
- 11 February
  - Two new BBC children's channels, CBeebies, aimed at children under 6 and CBBC, aimed at children aged 6–12, launch. The channels broadcast within the downtime of the BBC's established digital channels, with CBBC sharing its multiplex space with BBC Choice and CBeebies sharing its space with BBC Knowledge.
  - The Teletubbies spin-off "Teletubbies Everywhere" premieres alongside the launch of CBeebies. It is set in coloured backgrounds instead of the usual Teletubbyland.
  - ITV Digital launches a test card based on the BBC's Test Card F to be aired when its channels are off air. The card features the characters Al and Monkey playing a game of noughts and crosses.
- 12 February – Figures released by ITV Digital indicate that one in four of its subscribers are cancelling their subscription, a figure the company hopes will begin to improve.
- 14 February – In EastEnders, one of the soap's longest running characters, Dot Cotton, played by June Brown marries Jim Branning (John Bardon) in a Valentine's Day ceremony.
- 16 February – F1 Digital+ launches on Sky Digital.
- 18 February – The BBC loses the rights to air The Simpsons, being outbid by Channel 4. However, the broadcasting rights are held until 2006, eventually ending in May 2004.
- 21 February
  - Channel 5 has secured the rights to show the UK television premiere of Steven Spielberg's World War II epic Saving Private Ryan after signing a deal with Paramount Pictures, it is reported. The deal also includes the rights to several other films, including Fatal Attraction, The General's Daughter and An Officer and a Gentleman.
- 22 February
  - A peak audience of 5.6 million viewers watch late into the night on BBC Two as the Great Britain women's curling team win the gold medal at the 2002 Winter Olympics; it is Britain's first gold medal at a Winter Olympics since 1984.
  - Sarah Baxendale makes her debut as the Hollyoaks character Ellie Hunter.
  - Five airs the 3000th episode of Home and Away.
- 25 February – Release date of Will Young's debut single, the double-A side CD "Evergreen"/"Anything is Possible". With advanced sales of more than a million, the single is set to debut at number one in the UK Singles Chart and make chart history as the UK's biggest selling debut single.
- 27 February – BBC One airs The Boy Can't Help It, a follow-up documentary to the 1989 Q.E.D. programme, John's Not Mad which deals with sufferers of Tourette syndrome.
- 28 February – The Bill switches to a serial format.

=== March ===
- 1 March – Martin Kemp makes his last appearance as Steve Owen in EastEnders when he is killed off in a fireball car explosion.
- 2 March
  - BBC Knowledge ceases transmission in the early hours (the first BBC channel to permanently close) with BBC Four launching to replace it at 7pm. The opening night is simulcast on BBC Two.
  - The animated series of Mr. Bean premieres on ITV1 based on the original live-action series of the same title and Rowan Atkinson's Mr. Bean.
- 3 March
  - Will Young's debut single tops the charts, having accrued calculated sales of 1,108,269. It remains at the number one position for three weeks, before being replaced on 24 March by Pop Idol runner-up Gareth Gates, with his version of "Unchained Melody".
  - The acclaimed US spy drama 24, starring Kiefer Sutherland as agent Jack Bauer makes its British television debut on BBC Two.
- 11 March – Somerville College, Oxford wins the 2001–02 series of University Challenge, beating Imperial College London 200–185.
- 12 March – A report conducted for the Independent Television Commission and Broadcasting Standards Commission indicates that for the first time at least half of television viewers have access to multi channel television, i.e., channels other than the main five terrestrial channels.
- 13 March – A report by the Independent Television Commission indicates that viewer dissatisfaction with the quality of television stood at 64% in 2001, an 18% rise on the previous year. However, the authors of the report attribute the dramatic increase to the time at which their survey was conducted, shortly after the controversial Channel 4 spoof Brass Eye was broadcast.
- 15 March – Former Coronation Street actress Jane Danson will join ITV's The Bill as the series first lesbian police officer, it is reported. Her character, Gemma Osbourne, will be seen on screen in the Summer.
- 19 March – The Office of Communications Act 2002 receives Royal Assent, enabling the establishment of Ofcom.
- 21 March – Theo Paphitis and Neil Doncaster, the respective chairmen of Millwall and Norwich City football clubs, warn of serious financial consequences for their teams if ITV are allowed to renegotiate the £315 million agreement they signed to screen Football League matches.
- 26 March – BBC One announces that the current hot-air balloon idents are to be axed and be replaced by a new set called Rhythm & Movement on 29 March.
- 27 March – ITV Digital is placed into administration after failing to reach an agreement with the Football League over the £315 million three-year deal to air league matches. The company still owes £180 million which it says it cannot pay after its revenue was not as good as forecasts had predicted. Services will continue while negotiations to resolve the issue continue.
- 28 March – ITV announces the removal of Night and Day from its weekday teatime slot from 11 April, although late night episodes will continue to air on Thursdays, as well as a Sunday omnibus on ITV2. This is in response to the series attracting a relatively low audience of 1.5 million.
- 29 March
  - At 2:10am (in Northern Ireland at 2:50am), the last Balloon ident is shown on BBC One and with it, the last time the globe is used as the channel's symbol, having been used since 1963. Its replacement, the 'Rhythm & Movement' idents, premiere at 9am.
  - Channel 4's The Big Breakfast ends after almost a decade on the air.
  - My Kind of Music airs on ITV1 for the final time after five years. Although a further seven episodes from its final series have been recorded, these were ultimately not aired.
- 30 March – The death of Queen Elizabeth the Queen Mother is announced at 5:49pm on BBC One, who interrupts a repeat of Dazzling Bloomers to report the news. The news special is anchored by Peter Sissons. A celebrity edition of The Weakest Link and the season premiere of The Waiting Game are both dropped for the news coverage. A documentary about the Queen Mother cancels The National Lottery: Jet Set, and sends Casualty to BBC Two. Man and Boy starts thirty minutes earlier than scheduled, due to the addition of another news bulletin, while the film Air America is replaced by another movie, Tony Rome. BBC One's daily simulcast of BBC News 24 starts at 1.25am instead of 3.05am, displacing repeats of the previous day's Friday Night with Jonathan Ross and Top of the Pops. BBC Two interrupts a rerun of Steptoe and Son to simulcast both BBC News 24 and BBC One, but airs Rostropovich at 75 at its scheduled time followed by BBC One leftover Casualty (which replaces House Detectives at Large). ITV1 interrupts the All Star Animals Awards for a news report from Mary Nightingale, with Stars in Their Eyes airing one hour later than scheduled, displacing Blind Date, while Denis Norden's 7th Laughter File airs as usual and The Premiership starts five minutes later than scheduled following an additional news programme at 10pm.
- 31 March – Television schedules continues to change following the death of the Queen Mother. BBC One's day starts with Breakfast being extended to an hour, dropping a repeat of Animal Park. While Easter Day's special religious programming (Risen Today and live broadcast of Pope John Paul II's annual Easter Urbi et Orbi message) and Countryfile airs as scheduled, a repeat of Ground Force replaces a rebroadcast of the 1994 Keeping Up Appearances Christmas special, pushing Herbie Goes Bananas and the EastEnders omnibus twenty minutes earlier than billed. The afternoon news bulletin (alongside its weather forecast and the regional news magazines) airs fifty-five minutes later than billed, due to the first part of a documentary highlighting the Queen Mother until the end of World War II. It was followed by a special edition of Songs of Praise (whose regular airing was displaced by the aformentioned documentary). Both programmes replaces That Was Life. Antiques Roadshow is also dropped, replaced by a delayed Arthur – King of the Britons, which was displaced from its scheduled time by the second part of the Queen Mother documentary, which also removes Blackadder: Back & Forth from the schedule. Rescue Me airs five minutes later than scheduled due to the Nine o'clock bulletin being extended by five minutes, while Parkinson is replaced by a tribute to Dudley Moore, who passed away last Wednesday. Moore's tribute (which was due to air the previous night) leads to the films Days of Thunder and Breach of Conduct airing earlier than scheduled, with an extra programme, Wildlife Gems, being shown to get the schedule back on track (with The Sky at Night and BBC One joining BBC News 24 being shown at their scheduled time slots). BBC Two's only change is to replace coverage of the previous day's Balmoral Road Race by Charlie's Gardening Neighbours and A Foot Again in the Past, with BBC Choice bumping a repeat of Film 2002 with Jonathan Ross in favour of a repeat of Celebrity Overload.
- March – Mark Thompson succeeds Michael Jackson as Chief Executive of Channel 4.

=== April ===
- 1 April – Naomi Russell, who leaves her role as Coronation Street character Bobbi Lewis this month, is to have a starring role in Sky One's new airline based drama Mile High, it is reported.
- 2 April – More than 1,500 viewers have complained to the BBC about its coverage of the Queen Mother's death, it is reported, with the majority of complaints concerning the rescheduling of favourite programmes and the belief that too much airtime was devoted to events surrounding her death. Peter Sissons is criticised by some newspapers, including the Daily Mail, for not wearing a black tie to report the death, and by some viewers for what is perceived to have been an insensitive interview with The Hon. Margaret Rhodes, the Queen Mother's niece.
- 3 April – GMTV presenter Eamonn Holmes signs a three-year contract to stay with the broadcaster until 2005.
- 6 April
  - ITV records a record low audience share of 3% for football programme The Goal Rush during the broadcast of the 2002 Grand National on BBC One.
  - Cat Deeley presents her final edition of SM:TV after 4 years.
- 8 April – The shopping channel Shop! closes down after 4 years on the air.
- 9 April
  - Queen Elizabeth The Queen Mother's funeral is held at Westminster Abbey and aired on all major television channels. The event makes UK television history as the country's largest ever outside broadcast, while proceedings are watched by an average 10 million viewers. Provisional viewing figures released the following day suggest BBC audiences peaked at 7.1 million and ITV at 3.3 million. The BBC coverage is presented by David Dimbleby and ITV's by Sir Trevor McDonald.
  - Emmerdale confirm the axing of their Soapstars family. Ruth Abram leaves the series immediately, with the other four actors appearing on screen until the Summer.
- 10 April
  - Producers of The Experiment are forced to reedit parts of the programme ahead of its debut after some participants complain about the way they are shown in the series.
  - BBC Four airs Ian Curteis's The Falklands Play, in which Patricia Hodge plays the role of Margaret Thatcher during the Falklands War. The play was originally written in 1986, but shelved by the BBC because of an upcoming general election and the play's perceived pro-Thatcher stance. The play has separate radio and television versions, airing on Radio 4 on 6 April and gives BBC Four an audience of 174,000, the channel's highest audience since its launch a month earlier.
- 12 April – Tamzin Outhwaite leaves EastEnders as Mel Owen.
- 17 April – The first Helen Rollason Cancer Care Centre, named for the sports presenter Helen Rollason who died of cancer in 1999 is opened in Chelmsford, Essex.
- 18 April – An episode of The Bill in which six characters are killed off in a petrol bomb attack is watched by 8.6 million viewers, giving the show its largest audience of the year so far.
- 20 April – The final edition of The Generation Game presented by Jim Davidson is broadcast.
- 21 April – Blackadder: Back & Forth makes its terrestrial television debut on BBC One. The programme, having originally been scheduled to air on 31 March (Easter Sunday), was postponed because of ongoing coverage of the death of the Queen Mother.
- 22 April
  - Liquid News presenter Christopher Price is found dead at his London home. An inquest later returns a verdict of death by natural causes after hearing he died of heart failure caused by meningoencephalitis, a rare brain infection similar to meningitis.
  - The pay-per-view movie channel ITV Select closes. The channel, a joint venture between ITV Digital and SDN, is taken off air after ITV Digital's administrators withdrew its funding.
- 25 April – ITV Digital is officially put up for sale by administrators Deloitte & Touche, but the company must be sold in the next few days to avoid liquidation because owners Carlton and Granada have not put forward any extra money to keep it afloat.
- 26 April – Making her first appearance as a panellist on an edition of Have I Got News for You at the age of 16, singer Charlotte Church becomes the youngest person to appear on the show.
- 27 April – Stewart Duff wins the fourteenth series of Stars in Their Eyes, performing as Elvis Presley.
- 29 April – The first edition of RI:SE is broadcast as a replacement for The Big Breakfast, exactly a month after it was axed.
- 30 April –
  - The 900 workers at ITV Digital's Pembrokeshire call centre are told they are likely to be made redundant as the firm's troubles continue.
  - Granada Breeze ceases broadcasting after six and a half years after leaving NTL's cable service.

=== May ===
- 1 May – ITV Digital's Pay-TV operations cease at 7am after administrators Deloitte & Touche decided to close the company for good, having failed to find a buyer for it. The ITV Sport Channel is redesignated as a free-to-air channel, enabling viewers to watch the final matches of the football season. The Independent Television Commission launches a fast-track process to find a replacement provider for digital terrestrial television in the UK.
- 11 May
  - The ITV Sport Channel closes following the expiry of its Football League rights. Other sports shown on the channel will be aired by ITV2.
  - The Vault, a big-money game show based on the Israeli format created by Erez Tal, Ori Gross and Ruti Nissan for Menta Productions and Keshet Broadcasting, makes its debut on ITV1, hosted by Davina McCall.
- 13–20 May – BBC One airs Ricky & Bianca, a two-part EastEnders spin-off, leading up to the return of Ricky Butcher as a regular character.
- 14 May – The Experiment debuts on BBC One.
- 16 May – A UK version of The Chair, a US game show originally created in New Zealand by Julie Christie, Darryl McEwen and Brian Bigg for Touchdown Television and hosted by former tennis player John McEnroe in which contestants must control their heart rate while answering questions, will be produced for BBC One, it is reported. McEnroe will also present the UK programme which will air in the Autumn.
- 20 May – Challenge TV is rebranded as 'Challenge' and axes in-vision continuity.
- 21 May
  - The Independent Television Commission grants a two-week extension to applicants planning to bid to run a digital service to replace ITV Digital. The delay is to allow the companies to develop their technical proposals and means applications must be submitted by 13 June.
  - More than 100 viewers have complained to the BBC about an episode of BBC One's new spy drama Spooks which aired the previous evening: it depicted an MI5 agent having her head pushed into a deep fat fryer before being shot.
  - 20th Century Fox Television are to remake ITV's 1970s based comedy The Grimleys for the US market, The Guardian reports. The series, scheduled for broadcast later in the year, will be set in the present and renamed The Grubbs.
- 22 May – Channel 5 announces it has axed the weekly Pepsi Chart show after it lost two-thirds of its viewers, with the last edition scheduled to air on 25 June.
- 25 May – Latvia's Marie N wins the 2002 Eurovision Song Contest with I Wanna.
- 26 May – The Osbournes, a US reality television series about heavy metal singer Ozzy Osbourne and his family, makes its British television debut on MTV, giving the channel a record audience of 500,000.
- 29 May – Jonny Gibb, a Detective Constable from Edinburgh, Scotland wins the second UK series of Survivor and the show's £1 million prize money.
- 30 May – The Broadcasting Standards Commission rules that scenes showing domestic abuse in episodes of EastEnders that aired over Christmas 2001 were inappropriate for a pre-watershed audience. The scenes, in which Trevor Morgan attacked his wife, Little Mo went too far when families would have been watching the programme.
- 31 May–30 June – The BBC and ITV air live coverage of the 2002 FIFA World Cup.

=== June ===
- 3 June
  - The Golden Jubilee of Elizabeth II. During the Golden Jubilee Weekend, BBC One airs the Party at the Palace, while BBC Parliament reruns footage of the Queen's coronation from 1953.
  - Lads' Army debuts on ITV1, a new social experiment series in which 30 men aged between 18 and 24 undertake a four-week period of National Service, which was compulsory for all men in the 1950s.
- 6 June
  - BBC Two begins showing The Hunt for Britain's Paedophiles, a three part documentary series following investigations by Scotland Yard's specialist Paedophile Unit. The programme proves to be controversial, even before going on the air, as it is reported that after spending two years shadowing investigators, many members of the production team required counselling to deal with their exposure to the things witnessed by the unit's detectives. Executive producer Bob Long defends the programme, saying he hopes it will lead to better policing of the crime. The series concludes on 20 June.
  - An advert for Microsoft's Xbox console featuring a newborn boy who flies through the air while rapidly aging, before falling into his grave is banned from being shown again by the Independent Television Commission after complaints were received from 135 viewers who found the commercial to be "offensive, shocking and in bad taste".
- 8 June – ITV airs the first edition of Ant & Dec's Saturday Night Takeaway, a new live Saturday night entertainment show hosted by Ant & Dec. It airs for a total of nine series until it is put on hiatus in 2009, before returning for a further eleven series from 2013 until 2024.
- 10 June – ITV introduces a second Monday episode of Coronation Street. It is broadcast at 8:30pm to usher in the return of Bet Lynch. The episode is also used intermittently during the popular Richard Hillman storyline but becomes fully scheduled from Monday 25 August 2003.
- 13 June
  - BBC One airs Episode 4000 of Neighbours.
  - Variety magazine reports that Channel 4 has won the British terrestrial television rights to The Osbournes, paying £100,000 per episode.
- 14 June – The BBC, ITV and Channel 4 are among the six applicants who have submitted proposals for a licence to run a digital terrestrial television service. Three licences will be awarded, a process expected to happen in July.
- 17 June – ITV recommissions Crossroads for another year, despite falling audience figures. Yvon Grace is also hired as its executive producer and announces plans to make it a "must-see daytime show".
- 19 June
  - BBC One airs Tomorrow's World: the Science of Spider-Man, a special edition of Tomorrow's World that looks at the scientific facts behind the Spider-Man film.
  - As England prepare to take on Brazil in the World Cup, BBC One makes an eleventh hour decision to replace the scheduled film, Falling Down, with a repeat of the England v Brazil match from the 1970 World Cup.
- 23 June – Sky One airs the Star Trek-themed episode of Futurama, featuring guest stars from the main cast of the original series with its special appearance by The Next Generation's Jonathan Frakes.
- 24 June – Catchphrase returns to ITV1 in a new teatime slot airing five days a week, with Mark Curry taking over as host from Nick Weir.
- 25 June – ITV has told the newspapers that Peak Practice is axed after nine years.
- 29 June – EastEnders actress Kim Medcalf is injured in a motoring accident while on holiday in France, suffering a broken hand, leg and breastbone. She is airlifted back to the UK a few days later. and discharged from hospital on 9 July.

=== July ===
- 1 July – The EastEnders character Mark Fowler, played by Todd Carty, has been axed after 12 years, it is announced. The character who was involved in one of the soap's most controversial storylines after contracting HIV from a former lover, will leave the series in 2003.
- 2 July – That night's episode of Channel 4 soap Hollyoaks sets a new world record for the longest on-screen kiss at three minutes, fifteen seconds. The kiss, featuring Sarah Baxendale who plays Ellie Hunter and Marcus Patric (Ben Davies) surpasses the previous record of three minutes, five seconds held since 1941 by Regis Toomey and Jane Wyman in the film You're in the Army Now.
- 3 July – David Liddiment announces he will step down as ITV's head of programming. His decision comes after the network's viewership dropped below that of the BBC and following the collapse of ITV Digital.
- 4 July – A joint venture between the BBC and media firm Crown Castle is awarded the licences for a digital terrestrial television service to replace ITV Digital. The free-to-air service will include 24 channels from the BBC and commercial television, including three from Sky.
- 5 July – The Football League agrees a four-year deal with Sky Sports for live television rights, worth £95 million. The deal is agreed in the aftermath of the collapse of ITV Digital, whose controversial £315 million contract with the league was responsible for its downfall.
- 6 July
  - Children's media company Gullane Entertainment, the owners of Thomas the Tank Engine, Art Attack and Sooty among other popular franchises; agrees to a £139 million purchase by rival company HIT Entertainment.
  - Lock Keepers Cottage in Bow, East London, used as the setting for The Big Breakfast which was axed in March, is to be sold as a private house for £1,000,000, it is reported.
  - Home on Their Own debuts on ITV1, presented by Ulrika Jonsson.
- 7 July
  - Disc jockey Chris Evans has signed a deal with Channel 5 to produce a five-nights-a-week chat show that will air for 13 weeks from September.
  - London's Burning returns to ITV for its fourteenth series with a new set of opening and closing credits.
- 11 July – BBC One airs a special edition of Parkinson in which Michael Parkinson travels to South Africa to talk with its former President Nelson Mandela.
- 12 July
  - Dani Behr and Joe Mace are dropped from The Saturday Show as the programme struggles to compete with its ITV1 rival SM:TV. They will present their last editions of the show in September.
  - After reprising his EastEnders role as Ricky Butcher for a one-off special earlier in the year, Sid Owen is to make a permanent return to the soap, it is confirmed.
- 13 July
  - BBC One airs the first Sport Relief telethon.
  - Channel 5 airs The Great Dome Robbery, Gabriel Range's film about the 2000 Millennium Dome raid, starring Craig Fairbrass.
- 22 July – Channel 4 is criticised by the Independent Television Commission after explicit content in Brookside was aired before the watershed. The scenes involved the characters Max and Jacqui Farnham who became embroiled in a passionate embrace after Jacqui was taken to hospital following a car crash.
- 23 July – BBC Two airs a special "then and now" edition of TOTP2 in which present day performances of hits by artists and groups such as Robert Plant, Neil Diamond and A-ha are compared with archive performances.
- 25 July – The BBC airs the final episode of the children's preschool programme Tweenies.
- 25 July–4 August – The BBC broadcasts live coverage of the 2002 Commonwealth Games.
- 26 July – Kate Lawler wins series three of Big Brother, becoming the show's first female winner.
- 28 July – Fearne Cotton and Simon Grant will succeed Dani Behr and Joe Mace as presenters of BBC One's The Saturday Show from September, it is announced. The programme will also be revamped to include a Top of the Pops spin-off in an attempt to compete with ITV1's CD:UK.
- 29 July – Channel 4 debuts the three-part dramatised documentary Sex BC, is about the ancient history of human sexuality in which prehistoric peoples throughout civilisation from different periods include the Stone Age, Greece and Egypt within the subject material being handled in an intelligent and educational fashion. The series continues on 12 August.
- 31 July – The BBC is censured by the Broadcasting Standards Commission for failing to sufficiently warn viewers about the level of violence in an episode of Spooks depicting the murder of an MI5 agent. However, the watchdog does not criticise the nature of the scene itself, describing it as "shocking but...acceptable and important [in the context of] the [episode's] later narrative".

=== August ===
- 1 August – Channel 5 announces a deal with Columbia TriStar allowing it to show blockbuster films such as Spider-Man, Panic Room, Stuart Little 2, Kermit's Swamp Years and Men in Black II. The channel will also screen the controversial American police drama series The Shield.
- 6 August – Veteran sports presenter Bob Wilson announces he will retire at the end of the month after three decades in broadcasting.
- 12 August – Channel 4 airs the documentary Sex: The Annabel Chong Story.
- 13 August – BBC Two airs a special edition of TOTP2 dedicated to reggae as part of the BBC's Jamaica 40 season.
- 18 August – Props from EastEnders are among items on display at an exhibition celebrating film-making at Borehamwood, Herts.
- 19 August – The BBC and Crown Castle announce their new digital terrestrial television service will be named Freeview and will be on air in the Autumn.
- 21 August – The BBC publishes a list of the top 100 greatest Britons as voted for by a poll in 2001. The list comes ahead of a series scheduled for later in the year in which the top ten will be revealed in a series of one-hour programmes presented by the likes of Jeremy Clarkson, Rosie Boycott and Andrew Marr who will argue the case for each of those on the list with the public given a chance to vote for who they believe to be the greatest Briton. A final will then be presented by Anne Robinson in which the greatest Briton will be revealed. The top 100 includes names such as Boudicca, Winston Churchill, Richard III, J. K. Rowling, David Beckham and Cliff Richard.
- 23 August – Channel 5 announces plans to rebrand itself as Five. The rebrand will take place on 16 September.
- 25 August
  - BBC One airs a special edition of its garden makeover series Ground Force in which Alan Titchmarsh, Charlie Dimmock and Tommy Walsh transform a public space in New York into a memorial garden to mark the first anniversary of the September 11 attacks.
  - The first series of I'm a Celebrity... Get Me Out of Here! begins on ITV1.
- 30 August – ITV1 soap Crossroads airs for the last time this year before taking a short break. The show is to be revamped due to low viewing figures.
- 31 August
  - The first episode of the BBC children's television series Dick and Dom in Da Bungalow is broadcast presented by Richard McCourt and Dominic Wood. The show is broadcast on Saturday mornings and in later series airing a Sunday edition before being axed in 2006.
  - The final episode of Family Fortunes presented by Les Dennis is aired on ITV1, although 14 unaired episodes from his last series are later shown during Christmas 2004. Dennis has left the show after 15 years following disagreements over plans to move the show to a five days a week teatime slot.

=== September ===
- 1 September – Smile premieres on BBC Two, presented by Devin Griffin, Fearne Cotton and Reggie Yates.
- 2 September
  - The Scottish children's series Balamory debuts on CBeebies.
  - Family Fortunes returns to ITV1 in its new teatime slot. Andy Collins takes over as presenter and other changes include the removal of the star prize and a reduction of the 'Big Money' jackpot.
- 4 September – A two-day auction of ITV Digital assets begins at the company's headquarters to help pay off its debts. Among the 3,500 items up for sale are desks, televisions and video equipment, ITV Digital mugs and Monkey mascots.
- 7 September
  - Play Your Cards Right returns to ITV1 for a new series after a three-year break.
  - Popstars: The Rivals debuts on ITV1. The show will create two rival groups, one male and one female who will compete against each other for the Christmas Number One spot on the UK Singles Chart.
- 8 September
  - BBC One celebrates the 21st anniversary of its sitcom, Only Fools and Horses, by repeating the first episode originally aired in 1981.
  - Tony Blackburn is voted the winner of the first series of I'm a Celebrity... Get Me out of Here!
- 9 September
  - BBC One launches Inside Out, a regionally based television series in England. The series focuses on stories from the local area of each BBC region and replaces a number of different titles previously used on BBC Two.
  - ITV1 airs A Is for Acid, a drama starring Martin Clunes as a 1940s acid bath killer John George Haigh.
- 10 September
  - ITV1 airs the four Star Wars films with the 1997 Special Edition versions of the Original Trilogy including A New Hope, followed by The Empire Strikes Back (8 October), Return of the Jedi (5 November) and the first showing of The Phantom Menace (3 December) during the four-month period on Tuesday evenings.
  - Channel 5 airs the UK television premiere of the Steven Spielberg film Saving Private Ryan. Overnight viewing figures indicate it to have had an audience of 2.7 million. The film which includes graphic scenes depicting the Normandy landings is aired uncut and in an unusual move for mainstream UK television, it is shown again a few days later on 15 September, a day before the channel is rebranded.
- 11 September – BBC News 24, ITN News Channel and Sky News provide in-depth coverage of the first anniversary of the September 11 attacks as commemorative events are held around the world. Coverage of the memorial services and events are also shown live on BBC One and on ITV1.
- 13 September
  - Channel 5 has recommissioned its soap Family Affairs for a further year, The Guardian reports. The soap had been facing the axe, but was partially saved by an increase in ratings provided by Australian soap Home and Away which airs in the schedule immediately before it.
  - Top of the Pops airs its 2,000th edition.
- 14 September – Joe Mace and Dani Behr present their final edition of The Saturday Show.
- 16 September – Channel 5 rebrands itself to Five and drops its digital on-screen graphic.
- 21 September – Simon Grant and Fearne Cotton present their first The Saturday Show, succeeding Joe Mace and Dani Behr.
- 23 September – Live with Chris Moyles makes its debut on Five. The nightly show is presented by him from a London bar. The series attracts an audience of between 400,000 and 700,000 in its 7pm slot and is recommissioned for a second run in October. However, Moyles is replaced as presenter by Christian O'Connell when the programme returns in February 2003. and it is subsequently axed in June 2003 following declining ratings.
- 24 September – Five announces plans to axe Open House with Gloria Hunniford as part of a revamp of its daytime schedule, despite the programme achieving a regular audience of 900,000 and relatively strong ratings for the channel.
- 26 September – Sky1 airs The Truth, the season nine finale of The X-Files and the last episode in the series original run. On terrestrial television it is aired by BBC Two on 23 March 2003.
- 27 September – Castaway Television Productions Ltd, a company co-owned by Bob Geldof is to take legal action against Granada and London Weekend Television, the makers of I'm a Celebrity...Get Me Out of Here, claiming the idea for the reality programme was stolen from Castaway's Survivor series. However, the lawsuit is dropped in April 2003 after a similar case in the United States between CBS, the makers of Survivor and ABC, the makers of I'm a Celebrity...Get Me Out of Here, held that the idea had not been stolen, but was part of a "continual evolutionary process involving borrowing frequently from what has gone before".
- 29 September – Michael Jackson's Face, a Five documentary about singer Michael Jackson's attempts to alter his appearance, is watched by 3.6 million viewers, giving the channel its highest audience to date, excluding ratings for football and films.
- 30 September
  - The ITN News Channel is relaunched as the ITV News Channel.
  - Play UK closes due to low ratings following the closure of ITV Digital.

=== October ===
- 1 October – Hear'Say, the band formed by the ITV series Popstars announce they are to split, citing pressure and public abuse as the reasons for their decision.
- 3 October – The BBC, Crown Castle and BSkyB announce that 30 October as the launch date for the new Freeview service. Extra channels have also been added to the lineup.
- 4 October – Debut of the BBC's Fame Academy where 12 contestants compete to win a recording contract.
- 5 October – Charlotte Gethin, performing as Eva Cassidy wins the first series of the junior edition of Stars in Their Eyes.
- 6 October – BBC Choice's Liquid News is relaunched with a new studio and graphics and a new presenting team consisting of Claudia Winkleman and Colin Paterson.
- 7 October – The BBC announces that Laurence Llewelyn-Bowen will succeed Carol Smillie as the presenter of Changing Rooms.
- 10 October – Channel 4 announces that Brookside will lose its prime time weeknight slot and will be condensed into a 90-minute weekly episode airing on Saturday afternoons. The changes will take place from 30 November and spark fears it could be axed when its contract comes up for renewal in 2003.
- 13 October
  - The Independent Television Commission rejects more than 160 viewer complaints that scenes depicting a gay kiss between two police officers on The Bill which aired at 8pm were not appropriate viewing before the watershed.
  - BBC One airs Mr Trebus: A Life of Grime, a 60-minute programme paying tribute to Edmund Trebus, a compulsive hoarder who became famous after featuring in the first series of A Life of Grime in 1999 who died the previous month.
  - Stanley Kubrick's controversial 1971 film A Clockwork Orange receives its British terrestrial television debut on Channel 4.
- 16 October – ITV's two largest companies, Carlton and Granada agree the terms of a £2.6bn merger deal.
- 17 October – BBC News 24 chief political correspondent Nick Robinson is appointed as ITN's political editor, replacing John Sergeant who retires at the end of the year.
- 18 October – Staff at a St Helens supermarket start a petition after Channel 4's announcement that Brookside will lose its weeknight episodes from 30 November.
- 19 October
  - Blind Date returns to ITV1 with a new look, with contestants now given the chance to reject their initial choice of date after seeing them for the first time, which is referred to on the show as 'Date or Ditch'.
  - The top ten greatest Britons is revealed ahead of a BBC Two series to choose the greatest Briton. The top ten is as follows: Isambard Kingdom Brunel, Winston Churchill, Oliver Cromwell, Charles Darwin, Diana, Princess of Wales, Queen Elizabeth I, John Lennon, Horatio Nelson, Isaac Newton, and William Shakespeare.
- 20 October – BBC Two's motoring series Top Gear is relaunched with a brand new format.
- 22 October – Former Hear'Say band member Myleene Klass famously breaks down during an appearance on The Frank Skinner Show while recalling how she was verbally abused when she went to buy an ironing board from Argos.
- 24 October – During an edition of Five's The Wright Stuff, presenter Matthew Wright mistakenly names John Leslie as the mystery "acquaintance" who raped Ulrika Jonsson as detailed in her autobiography. This prompts a slew of further sexual accusations against Leslie in the coming days.
- 27 October – London Weekend Television broadcast their final day after 34 years on the air. A modern-day recreation of a 1970s-style startup is shown in the early morning and just after midnight a montage of LWT presentation over the years is broadcast, introduced in-vision by two of LWT's announcers, Trish Bertram and Glen Thompsett.
- 28 October – In England and Wales, ITV drops regional identification from most programmes and adopts a unified branding of just ITV1. The names for the London (Carlton and LWT), West (HTV West) and Wales (HTV Wales) are dropped altogether and replaced with ITV1 London, ITV1 West of England and ITV1 Wales respectively, though the names continue to appear elsewhere.
- 30 October
  - Formal broadcasting of ITV Digital's replacement Freeview begins at 6am.
  - With the launch of Freeview, BBC Parliament becomes available in vision for the first time to Digital Terrestrial Television viewers. Due to capacity limitations on the DTT platform, from its launch until that day, the channel had only been available in audio format.
  - This Morning presenter John Leslie is dismissed by Granada Television following a series of allegations about his personal life. Although he is subsequently cleared, his television career never recovers.
  - Have I Got News For You presenter Angus Deayton is sacked after allegations regarding his personal life appeared in the media. Since his departure, the show has been hosted by a different guest presenter each week, a format that continues permanently.
  - The free-to-air music video channel The Hits goes on the air. UK History is also launched on the same day.
  - At 12noon, local news channel Channel One Liverpool closes.
- 31 October
  - Launch of TMF UK, a free-to-air music video channel and part of the Music Factory brand.
  - The Independent Television Commission rules that a frank discussion about sex that aired on This Morning in May was inappropriate for a daytime show on a mainstream channel.

=== November ===
- 1 November
  - 20th anniversary of S4C.
  - The first episode of Have I Got News for You after the departure of Angus Deayton is broadcast and hosted by Paul Merton who is described by BBC News as having been "merciless" in his treatment of his former co-star. Guest presenters in subsequent weeks include Anne Robinson, John Sergeant, future Prime Minister Boris Johnson, Liza Tarbuck, Charles Kennedy and Jeremy Clarkson.
- 2 November – 20th anniversary of Channel 4.
- 8 November – Lock Keeper's Cottage, the building in East London used for the Big Breakfast house is destroyed by fire, eight months after the show was axed.
- 14 November – Harry Hill's TV Burp begins on ITV1 with ITV2 showing repeats afterwards.
- 15 November – South African Nathan Roberts and Camilla Priest from Sunderland are named as the winners of the second and final series of Channel 4's Model Behaviour. They each win a year's contract with Select Model Management.
- 20 November
  - The government publishes the Communications Bill which will introduce new media regulations and establish Ofcom as the new media watchdog, replacing several existing bodies.
  - The controversial German anatomist Gunther von Hagens performs the first public autopsy in the UK for 170 years, to a sell-out audience of 500 people in a London theatre. The event is filmed and broadcast on Channel 4, prompting a raft of complaints from viewers.
- 21 November – Shane Richie makes his first appearance as Alfie Moon in EastEnders.
- 23 November – The penultimate edition of Popstars: The Rivals is broadcast in which Matt Johnson, Anton Gordon, Daniel Pearce, Jamie Shaw and Keith Semple are chosen as the members of the male group which will be named One True Voice.
- 24 November
  - Sir Winston Churchill is voted the Greatest Briton of all time by viewers of BBC Two's 100 Greatest Britons.
  - The first episode of the third and final series of Catchphrase to feature Nick Weir as presenter is aired on ITV1. The 21-episode series is scattered all over the schedules and takes nearly two-and-a-half years to complete its broadcast.
  - ITV broadcasts the first episode of a three part version of the 1957 novel Doctor Zhivago. Adapted by Andrew Davies, it stars Hans Matheson as Zhivago and Keira Knightley as Lara.
- 27 November – ITV have warned Granada that London's Burning will be dropped from the schedule if the series does not develop new ideas to reverse falling ratings, it is reported.
- 29 November – Former Take That singer Mark Owen wins the second series of Celebrity Big Brother.
- 30 November – The final of Popstars: The Rivals is broadcast where Sarah Harding, Cheryl Tweedy, Nicola Roberts, Nadine Coyle and Kimberley Walsh are chosen as the members of the female groups which will be named Girls Aloud.

=== December ===
- 1 December – The Sunday Telegraph reports that Buckingham Palace has taken the rare step of writing a letter of complaint to the BBC about an item on the previous Sunday's On the Record discussing the future of the monarchy which it says was biased and inaccurate.
- 2 December – Claims that a technical glitch left viewers unable to vote for a contestant on the final of Popstars: The Rivals are rejected by the programme. Several people who voted for Javine Hylton have claimed their votes were either not registered or that they heard a recording telling them they had voted for Sarah Harding. Hylton was the last contestant eliminated before the members of Girls Aloud were announced.
- 6 December – The final episode of Family Fortunes is aired on ITV1. The programme has been axed after 22 years following a drop in ratings after its move to being a daily teatime show. The network later revives the show in 2006 in a celebrity format and then again in 2020 in its original civilian format.
- 7 December – Gareth Gates' interpretation of "Unchained Melody" is voted the 2002 Record of the Year by ITV viewers.
- 8 December – Athlete Paula Radcliffe is named as this year's BBC Sports Personality of the Year.
- 10 December
  - The Prime Minister's wife Cherie Blair appears on television to make a public apology over dealings she had with convicted fraudster Peter Foster.
  - BBC Two airs a special edition of TOTP2 featuring Celine Dion.
- 13 December – David Sneddon wins the first series of Fame Academy.
- 15 December – On the Record, the BBC's flagship political programme, ends after 14 years on the air.
- 16 December – Children's adventure gameshow Raven broadcasts on CBBC for the first time.
- 17 December – BBC Two airs its first terrestrial television showing of Mike Nichols' 2001 American award-winning drama film Wit, starring Emma Thompson, Christopher Lloyd, Eileen Atkins and Harold Pinter. Based on the Margaret Edson's play of the same title, Vivian Bearing is a university English literature professor who has been diagnosed with ovarian cancer when she reflects on her reactions to several treatments and significant events in her life.
- 18 December – The joint NTL/Vivendi film channel The Studio announces it will close at the end of the year after its owners decide it is not financially viable.
- 22 December
  - The debut of the controversial BBC One documentary The Virgin Mary which questions many of the central aspects of the Nativity. The programme is condemned by groups associated with the Catholic Church and attracts 500 complaints from viewers, the highest number of complaints for a single programme in 2002. The programme is seen by an audience of just over three million. Crispian Hollis, the Roman Catholic Bishop of Portsmouth accuses the programme's makers of misrepresenting the Virgin Mary and says he will write to BBC Director-General Greg Dyke to complain about its broadcast.
  - A special edition of Popstars: The Rivals in which it is announced that "Sound of the Underground" recorded by Girls Aloud has reached Number one on the Singles Chart, thereby becoming the Christmas Number One. One True Voice's double A-side single, "Sacred Trust"/"After You're Gone" enters the charts at Number Two.
- 25 December
  - The 2000 Aardman stop-motion animated film Chicken Run airs on BBC One as part of the channel's Christmas Day schedule.
  - Strangers on the Shore, a Christmas special and the penultimate episode of Only Fools and Horses, is the highest rated show of the year in the UK, with an audience of 17.40 million.
  - Jack Ryder makes his last appearance as the EastEnders character Jamie Mitchell. He is killed off in a tragic storyline.
- 30 December – To celebrate the 30th anniversary of Mastermind, its original presenter, Magnus Magnusson returns to the role of quizmaster for a one-off special celebrity edition of the programme.
- 31 December – BBC One airs the final edition of Vets in Practice, a special in which the show's participants discuss their time with the series.

== Debuts ==
=== BBC One ===
- 4 January – Captain Abercromby (2002–2003)
- 5 January – 'The Mummy' (2002–2005)
- 8 January –
  - The Story of Tracy Beaker (2002–2006)
  - Jeopardy (2002–2004)
- 13 January – Stig of the Dump (2002)
- 17 February – Outside the Rules (2002)
- 3 March – Rescue Me (2002)
- 8 March – All About Me (2002–2004)
- 13 March –
  - Rockface (2002–2003)
  - Snoddy (2002)
- 4 April –Ted and Alice (2002)
- 16 April – Cutting It (2002–2005)
- 21 April – Born and Bred (2002–2005)
- 13 May – Spooks (2002–2011)
- 14 May – The Experiment (2002)
- 20 June – Being April (2002)
- 2 July – The Eustace Bros. (2002–2003)
- 2 August – The House That Jack Built (2002)
- 8 August – Any Time Now (2002)
- 10 August – Ella and the Mothers (2002)
- 31 August –Cavegirl (2002–2003)
- 1 September – Sparkhouse (2002)
- 6 September –
  - Celeb (2002)
  - Still Game (2002–2007, 2016, 2018–2019)
- 15 September – Out of Control (2002)
- 24 September – River City (2002–2026)
- 25 September – Flesh and Blood (2002)
- 2 October – High Hopes (2002–2008)
- 4 October – Fame Academy (2002–2003)

13 October – Sahara with Michael Palin (2002)

- 22 October – Wild West (2002–2004)
- 2 November – The Fairly OddParents (2002–2007)
- 23 November – Daniel Deronda (2002)
- 1 December – Jeffrey Archer: The Truth (2002)
- 8 December – Bootleg (2002)
- 26 December – The Hound of the Baskervilles (2002)

=== BBC Two ===
- 19 February – Manchild (2002)
- 3 March – 24 (2001–2010, 2014)
- 15 March – Dead Ringers (2002–2007)
- 27 May – Flog It! (2002–2020)
- 2 September –
  - Teletubbies Everywhere, the spin off of Teletubbies (2002)
  - Balamory (2002–2005)
- 30 September – Fimbles (2002–2003)
- 9 October – Tipping the Velvet (2002)
- 10 October – Look Around You (2002–2005)
- 20 October – Great Britons (2002)
- 11 November – TLC (2002)
- 16 December – Raven (2002–2010)

=== BBC Choice ===
- 4 March – Breeze Block (2002)
- 4 July – Having It Off (2002)
- 7 November – 15 Storeys High (2002–2004)

=== CBBC Channel ===
- 23 February – Yvon of the Yukon (2002–2005)
- 24 February – UK Top 40 (2002–2005)
- 31 August – Dick and Dom in da Bungalow (2002–2006)

=== ITV (Including ITV1 and ITV2) ===
- 3 January – Club Reps (2002–2004)
- 7 January –
  - Don't Eat the Neighbours (2001–2002)
  - Ripley and Scuff (2002–2003)
- 8 January – Footballers' Wives (2002–2006)
- 20 January – Bloody Sunday (2002)
- 3 February – Blood Strangers (2002)
- 11 February – Sir Gadabout: The Worst Knight in the Land (2002–2003)
- 17 February – The Jury (2002)
- 2 March – Mr. Bean: The Animated Series (2002–2004, 2015–present)
- 1 April – The Quest (2002)
- 7 April – The Forsyte Saga (2002–2003)
- 8 April – The Cry (2002)
- 16 April – I Saw You (2002)
- 6 May – Helen West (2002)
- 11 May – The Vault (2002–2004)
- 27 May – Plain Jane (2002)
- 3 June – Lads' Army (2002–2006)
- 8 June – Ant & Dec's Saturday Night Takeaway (2002–present)
- 9 July – Shipman (2002)
- 10 June – Bertie and Elizabeth (2002)
- 14 July – Believe Nothing (2002)
- 25 August – I'm a Celebrity... Get Me Out of Here! (2002–present)
- 2 September – As Told by Ginger
- 4 September – Engie Benjy (2002–2005)
- 4 September – SpongeBob SquarePants (1999–present)
- 9 September – A Is for Acid (2002)
- 16 September – Ultimate Force (2002–2006)
- 29 September – Rose and Maloney (2002–2005)
- 30 September – Today with Des and Mel (2002–2006)
- 10 October – The Adventures of Jimmy Neutron, Boy Genius (2002–2006)
- 13 October – Sirens (2002)
- 27 October – Foyle's War (2002–2015)
- 28 October – The Safe House (2002)
- 4 November – Stan the Man (2002)
- 7 November – Russian Roulette (2002–2003)
- 14 November –
  - Wire in the Blood (2002–2008)
  - Harry Hill's TV Burp (2002–2012)
- 24 November – Doctor Zhivago (2002)
- 26 December – Goodbye Mr Chips (2002)

=== Channel 4 ===
- 2 January – Shackleton (2002)
- 7 February – The Estate Agents (2002)
- 31 March – Totally Spies! (2001–2008)
- 12 April – The Book Group (2002–2003)
- 29 April – RI:SE (2002–2003)
- 10 June – Six Feet Under (2001–2005)
- July – Star Trek: Enterprise (2001–2005)
- 29 July – Sex BC (2002)
- 6 September – Bo' Selecta! (2002–2009)
- 17 September – White Teeth (2002)
- 14 October – Bodily Harm (2002)
- 12 November – Offenders (2002)
- 28 December – Dinotopia (2002)

=== Channel 5/Five ===
- 3 August – Audrey and Friends (2000; 2002)
- 5 August – BrainTeaser (2002–2007)
- 2 September – Make Way for Noddy (2002–2003)
- 12 September – Menace (2002)
- 29 September – The Shield (2002–2008)
- 6 October – Don't Blame the Koalas (2002–2003)
- 2 November – Beyblade (2001–2003)

=== Living TV ===
- 25 May – Most Haunted (2002–2010)

=== Sky One ===
- 17 January – Scrubs (2001–2008)
- 23 January – Alias (2001–2006)
- 26 May – Is Harry on the Boat? (2002–2003)
- 6 July – Zoids: Chaotic Century (2001)

=== Cartoon Network UK ===
- 7 January – Spaced Out (2001–2003)
- 11 February – Cubix: Robots for Everyone (2001–2004)
- 7 June – Beyblade (2001)
- 7 July – Baby Blues (2000–2002)
- 2 September – Time Squad (2001–2003)
- 5 October – Grim & Evil (2001–2002)

=== Nickelodeon UK ===
- 2 September – The Nick Cannon Show (2 September 2002 – 22 February 2003)

=== Nicktoons UK ===
- 7 January – The Adventures of Jimmy Neutron, Boy Genius (2002–2011)
- 12 January – Invader Zim (12 January 2002 – 19 August 2006)
- 12 January – Yu-Gi-Oh! (2001–2006)
- 1 September – The Fairly OddParents! (2001–2017)

=== Fox Kids UK ===
- 4 February – Shinzo (2000–2003)
- 18 February – Medabots (1999–2000)
- 22 April – Shin Chan (1992–)
- 2 September – Hamtaro (2000)
- 7 September – Pig City (2002)
- 21 September – Power Rangers: Wild Force (2002)
- Undated – Tracey McBean (2001–2006)

=== Disney Channel UK ===
- 21 January – The Proud Family (2002–2005)
- 2 September – That's So Raven (2002–2007)
- 4 November – Kim Possible (2002–2007 Disney Channel, 2003–2008 ITV Breakfast)

=== Trouble UK ===
- 3 February – My Wife & Kids (2002–2006)
- 18 March – One on One (2001–2006)
- 8 April – So Little Time (2001–2002)

== Channels ==
=== New channels ===
Date	Channel
11 February	CBBC
11 February	CBeebies
2 March	BBC Four
4 July	Avago
22 July	Nicktoons TV
24 September	Chart Show TV
10 October	Reality TV
14 October	CNX
30 October	The Hits
30 October	UK History
31 October	Solent TV
31 October	TMF
5 December	NASN
9 December	Sky One Mix
13 December	E! Europe

=== Defunct channels ===
Date	Channel
22 January	UTV2
2 March	BBC Knowledge
8 April	Shop!
30 April	Granada Breeze
30 April	Tara TV
12 May	ITV Sport Channel
30 September	Play UK
30 October	Channel One Liverpool
31 December	F1 Digital+

=== Rebranded channels ===
Date	Old Name	New Name
20 May	Challenge TV	Challenge?
1 July	Sky Premier/MovieMax/Cinema	Sky Movies Premier/Max/Cinema
16 September	Channel 5	Five
30 September	ITN News Channel	ITV News Channel

== Television shows ==
=== Changes of network affiliation ===
Show	Moved from	Moved to
Dig and Dug	Channel 4	Five
Ky's Boomerang	ITV	Boomerang
Blockbusters	Sky1	Challenge
Knightmare	Sci-Fi Channel	Challenge
You Bet!	ITV	Challenge
Wheel of Fortune	ITV	Challenge
Looney Tunes/Merrie Melodies	ITV	BBC Two/CBBC
The Fairly OddParents!	Nickelodeon	BBC One
SpongeBob SquarePants	Nickelodeon	ITV
As Told by Ginger	Nickelodeon	ITV

=== Returning this year after a break of one year or longer ===
- 28 April – Auf Wiedersehen, Pet (1983–1986 ITV, 2002–2004 BBC One)
- 20 October – Top Gear relaunches on BBC Two (1977–2001, 2002–2022)
- Unknown
  - Andy Pandy (1950–1970, 2002–2005)
  - Play Your Cards Right (1980–1987, 1994–1999, 2002–2003)

== Continuing television shows ==
=== 1920s ===
- BBC Wimbledon (1927–1939, 1946–2019, 2021–present)

=== 1930s ===
- Trooping the Colour (1937–1939, 1946–2019, 2023–present)
- The Boat Race (1938–1939, 1946–2019, 2021–present)

=== 1950s ===
- Flower Pot Men (1952–1958, 2001–2002)
- Panorama (1953–present)
- What the Papers Say (1956–2008)
- The Sky at Night (1957–present)
- Blue Peter (1958–present)
- Grandstand (1958–2007)

=== 1960s ===
- Coronation Street (1960–present)
- Songs of Praise (1961–present)
- Top of the Pops (1964–2006)
- Match of the Day (1964–present)
- Call My Bluff (1965–2005)
- The Money Programme (1966–2010)

=== 1970s ===
- Emmerdale (1972–present)
- Newsround (1972–present)
- Last of the Summer Wine (1973–2010)
- Wish You Were Here...? (1974–2003)
- Arena (1975–present)
- One Man and His Dog (1976–present)
- Grange Hill (1978–2008)
- Ski Sunday (1978–present)
- Antiques Roadshow (1979–present)
- Question Time (1979–present)

=== 1980s ===
- Children in Need (1980–present)
- Timewatch (1982–present)
- Brookside (1982–2003)
- Countdown (1982–present)
- James the Cat (1984–1992, 1998–2003)
- The Bill (1984–2010)
- Channel 4 Racing (1984–2016)
- EastEnders (1985–present)
- Comic Relief (1985–present)
- Casualty (1986–present)
- ChuckleVision (1987–2009)
- Fifteen to One (1988–2003, 2013–2019)
- This Morning (1988–present)

=== 1990s ===
- Stars in Their Eyes (1990–2006, 2015)
- 999 (1992–2003)
- Heartbeat (1992–2010)
- Breakfast with Frost (1993–2005)
- Wipeout (1994–2002)
- Animal Hospital (1994–2004)
- Room 101 (1994–2007, 2012–present)
- Time Team (1994–2013)
- The National Lottery Draws (1994–2017)
- Top of the Pops 2 (1994–present)
- Y Clwb Rygbi, Wales (1997–present)
- Dream Team (1997–2007)
- Family Affairs (1997–2005)
- Midsomer Murders (1997–present)
- Who Wants to Be a Millionaire? (1998–2014)
- Bob the Builder (1998–present)
- British Soap Awards (1999–2019, 2022–present)
- Holby City (1999–2022)
- The League of Gentlemen (1999–2002)
- My Parents Are Aliens (1999–2006)
- Tweenies (1999–2002)

=== 2000s ===
- Doctors (2000–present)
- Big Brother (2000–2018, 2023–present)
- The Weakest Link (2000–2012, 2017–present)
- At Home with the Braithwaites (2000–2003)
- Clocking Off (2000–2003)
- The Office (2001–2003)
- Ky's Bommerang (2001–2003)
- Pop Idol (2001–2003)
- The Kumars (2001–2006, 2014)
- Popworld (2001–2007)
- Real Crime (2001–2011)
- Survivor (2001–2002, 2023–present)
- Angelina Ballerina (2002–2005)

== Ending this year ==
- The Flower Pot Men (1952–1958, 2001–2002)
- Captain Pugwash (1957–1975, 1997–2002)
- How We Used To Live (1968–2002)
- Des O'Connor Tonight (1977–2002)
- Blankety Blank (1979–1990, 1997–2002)
- Family Fortunes (1980–1985, 1987–2002, 2006–2015, 2020–present)
- Catchphrase (1986–2002, 2013–present)
- The Ruth Rendell Mysteries (1987–2002)
- London's Burning (1988–2002)
- On the Record (1988–2002)
- Big Break (1991–2002)
- Brum (1991–2002)
- The Big Breakfast (1992–2002, 2021–2022)
- Peak Practice (1993–2002)
- Wipeout (1994–2002)
- I'm Alan Partridge (1997–2002)
- Playing the Field (1998–2002)
- Delia's How to Cook (1998–2002)
- The Pepsi Chart Show (1998–2002)
- Big Train (1998–2002)
- CBBC on Choice (1999–2002)
- Always and Everyone (1999–2002)
- The League of Gentlemen (1999–2002)
- The People Versus (2000–2002)
- Time Gentlemen Please (2000–2002)
- Audrey and Friends (2000, 2002)
- Model Behaviour (2001–2002)
- Teletubbies Everywhere (2002)

== Returning or renamed programs ==
Show	Last aired	Retitled as/Season/Notes	Channel	Return date
Mr. Bean	1995 (as a live-action sitcom)	Same (animated adoption)	ITV	March 2

== Births ==
- 6 November – Mya-Lecia Naylor, actress

== Deaths ==
Date	Name	Age	Cinematic Credibility
12 January	Stanley Unwin	90	comic performer (The Secret Service)
15 January	Jeremy Hawk	83	actor and host of Criss Cross Quiz
17 January	Peter Adamson	71	actor (Coronation Street)
24 January	Stuart Burge	84	television director
29 January	Stratford Johns	76	actor (Z-Cars)
29 January	Phil McCall	76	actor (Minder)
11 February	Barry Foster	74	actor (The Troubleshooters, Van der Valk)
21 February	John Thaw	60	actor (Inspector Morse, The Sweeney, Kavanagh Q.C.)
27 February	Spike Milligan	83	comedian
4 March	Eric Flynn	62	actor
6 March	Donald Wilson	91	television producer and scriptwriter (Doctor Who, The Forsyte Saga)
25 March	Kenneth Wolstenholme	81	BBC football commentator and presenter
27 March	Dudley Moore	66	comedian and actor (Not Only... But Also)
31 March	Barry Took	73	comedian, writer and television presenter
11 April	Delphi Lawrence	70	actress (The Saint, Sir Francis Drake)
12 April	Howard Pays	74	actor (Sixpenny Corner)
15 April	Dave King	72	actor (Coronation Street)
21 April	Terry Walsh	62	actor and stuntman
22 April	Christopher Price	34	television presenter
25 April	Michael Bryant	74	actor (The Stone Tape, The Roads to Freedom)
1 May	John Nathan-Turner	54	television producer (Doctor Who)
10 May	Austen Kark	75	television director (BBC World Service)
15 May	Bryan Pringle	67	actor (The Dustbinmen, Auf Wiedersehen, Pet, Inspector Morse)
17 May	Norman Vaughan	79	actor and comedian
18 May	Gordon Wharmby	68	actor (Last of the Summer Wine)
25 May	Pat Coombs	75	actress (Till Death Us Do Part, EastEnders)
30 May	Kenny Craddock	52	theme tune composer (Joking Apart)
26 June	Dermot Walsh	77	actor (Richard the Lionheart)
9 July	Gerald Campion	81	actor (Billy Bunter of Greyfriars School)
23 July	Leo McKern	82	actor (Rumpole of the Bailey)
24 July	Maurice Denham	92	actor
26 July	Tony Anholt	61	actor (Howards' Way)
28 July	Jack Karnehm	85	BBC snooker commentator
29 July	Peter Bayliss	80	actor (Please Sir!, The Sweeney, Coronation Street, Lovejoy, The Bill)
3 August	Carmen Silvera	80	actress (Edith Artois in 'Allo 'Allo!)
7 September	Katrin Cartlidge	41	actress (Brookside)
7 September	Michael Elphick	55	actor (Boon, EastEnders)
29 September	Edmund Trebus	83	compulsive hoarder who featured in the BBC's A Life of Grime
8 October	Phyllis Calvert	87	actress (Kate, Crown Court, Tales of the Unexpected, After Henry)
17 October	Pattie Coldwell	50	television presenter and journalist
24 October	Charmian May	65	actress (The Good Life, Keeping Up Appearances, You're Only Young Twice)
25 October	Richard Harris	72	actor (Harry Potter films)
7 November	Dilys Hamlett	74	actress
8 November	Christopher Parsons	70	television producer (Life on Earth)
27 November	Stanley Black	89	theme tune composer
10 December	Ian MacNaughton	76	comedy producer-director (Monty Python's Flying Circus)
17 December	James Hazeldine	55	actor (London's Burning)
19 December	Roger Webb	68	theme tune composer (Strange Report, Hammer House of Horror, The Gentle Touch, Paradise Postponed, George and Mildred)
20 December	Joanne Campbell	38	actor

== See also ==
- 2002 in British music
- 2002 in British radio
- 2002 in the United Kingdom
- List of British films of 2002
