= Jenny Richards =

Jenny Richards may refer to:

- Jenny Richards, a character from the 1970s British television series Survivors, played by Lucy Fleming
- Jenny Richards, a character from the television series Howards' Way played by Charmian Gradwell
- Jenny Richards, model and winner of the 2001 British reality show Model Behaviour
