= Mike Sergeant =

English journalist and television broadcaster

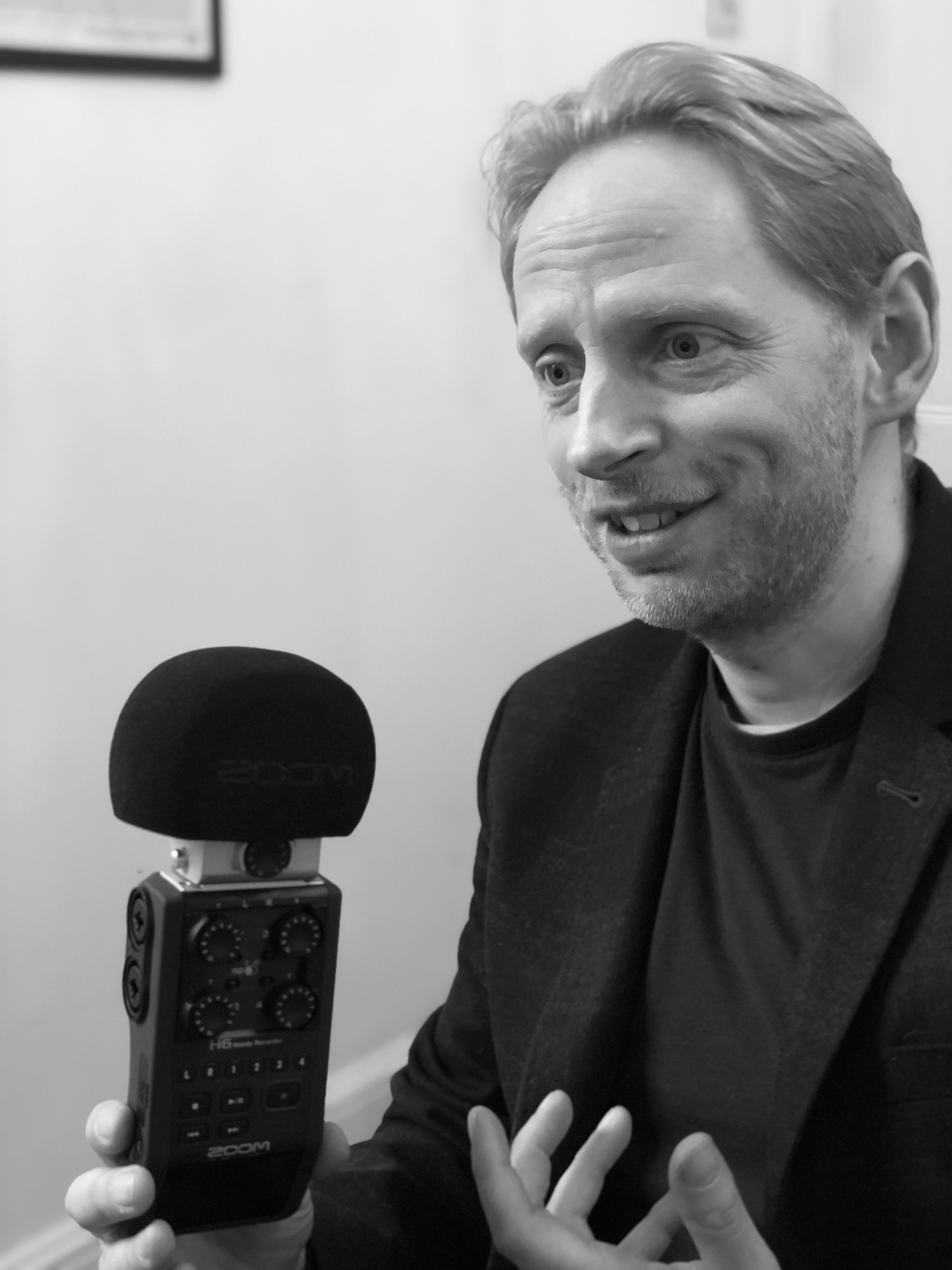
- Self-portrait photograph
- Born: Michael Sergeant
- Education: Westminster School
- Alma mater: Cambridge
- Occupations: Author, consultant, broadcaster
- Television: BBC News
- Parent: John Sergeant; Mary Smithies

Michael Sergeant is an English author, communications consultant and former journalist who worked for the BBC, Sky News, Reuters and CNN as a political correspondent, business correspondent and general news reporter. He also covered general and political stories across the UK for programmes including Today, BBC Breakfast and the BBC News Channel.

== Career ==
After leaving Sky News in 2001, Sergeant joined the BBC as a business reporter, working across the BBC's business output, including World Business Report and BBC Breakfast. He then worked exclusively for BBC Breakfast, covering business events and planning segments. He also briefly worked as a political correspondent during the 2005 General Election.

In October 2014, Sergeant announced his departure from the BBC after 13 years. He subsequently joined PR and media agency Headland as a client-facing director.
