= Hoarder house =

House overfilled with items by a hoarder

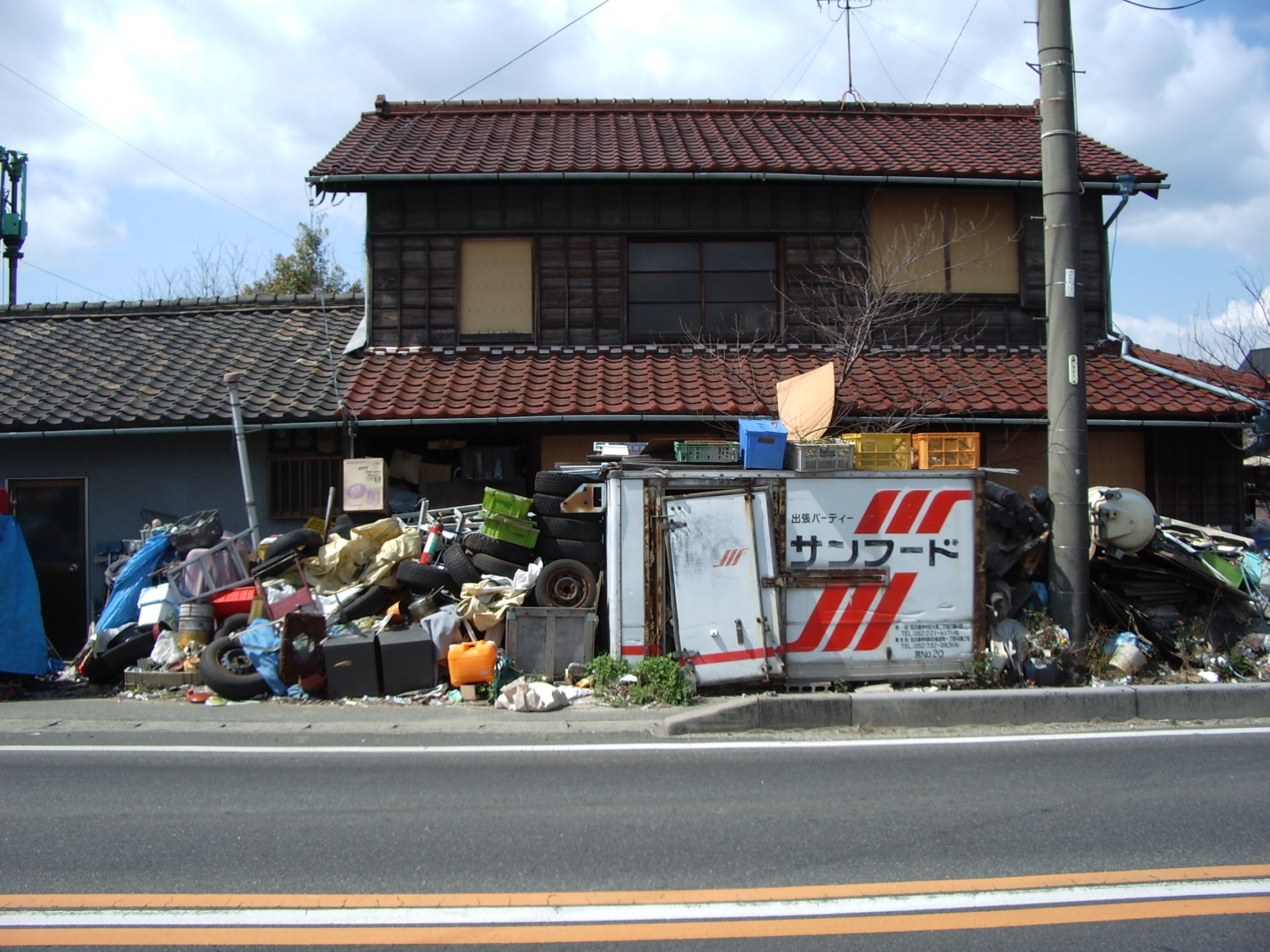
Hoarder house

A hoarder house (ごみ屋敷, gomi yashiki; garbage mansion), or "garbage house", is a term in Japan for a building (mainly a residence) or a piece of land that is not intended to be a refuse dump, but where garbage is left piled up. In addition to the resident's own garbage, the resident may bring in trash from nearby garbage collection points or accumulate junk as if they were running a recycling business.

From a psychiatric perspective, compulsive hoarding (habitually storing items away without using them) is considered an abnormal behavior called an obsessive-compulsive disorder (OCD). In 2013, the Diagnostic and Statistical Manual of Mental Disorders Version 5, published by the American Psychiatric Association, defined "hoarding disorder" as a new disease.

It is considered a problem because of the damage it causes to nearby residents due to foul odors, rodents, and insects (especially pests), as well as its susceptibility to crimes such as incipient fire and arson. Consequently, it has been reported as a social issue, mainly on wide shows and news programs on commercial TV key stations.

== General situation ==
In the widely reported cases, many of the people who build these hoarder houses are the owners of the land and houses, and some are even wealthy people who own multiple real estate in the vicinity. Many are elderly and living alone, married but living separately, or widowed. With no acquaintances or friends, estranged from relatives, they are completely isolated from the local population. Such social isolation is considered to be one of the primary factors that lead to the formation of hoarder houses.

Once the premises deteriorate into a hoarding house, it becomes difficult for the residents to clean up the mess by themselves, leading to a vicious cycle that worsens over time. Even for objects that are generally considered garbage, legal ownership rights exist. Even if something appears to be unquestionably garbage to a third party, it is difficult for neighbors or the government to intervene and forcibly remove it when the owner claims it is not.

In addition, in the case of private property, entry without a valid cause is considered illegal trespassing, which makes the problem more difficult to solve.

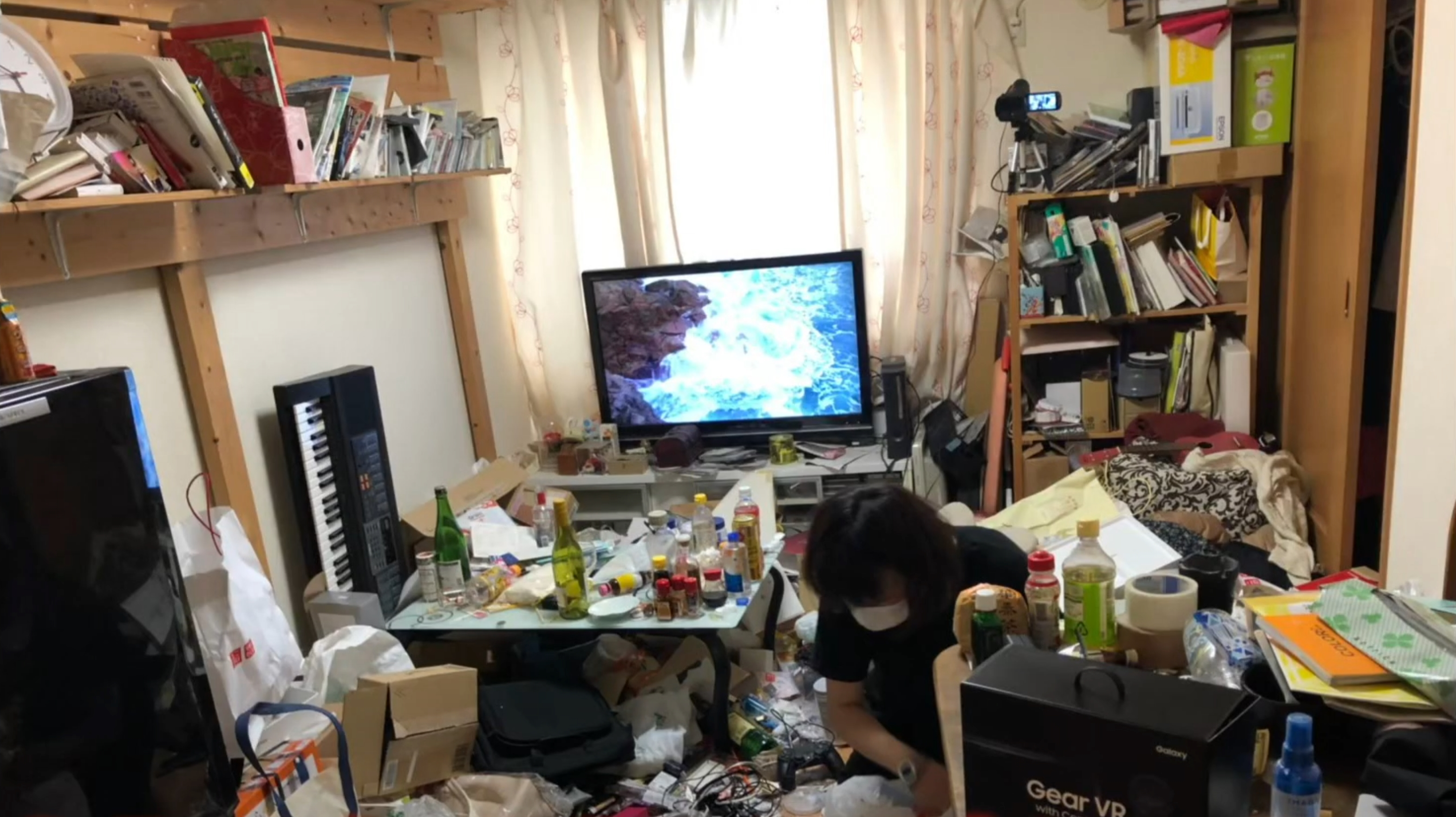
Hoarder's room

Another case occurs when neighbors repeatedly dump garbage illegally in private homes or real estate properties that have been left unoccupied for an extended period while the owner neglects it without taking countermeasures. In this case, the blame would fall on the lack of morals and illegal behavior of neighborhood residents (most likely a specific few) rather than the owner of the hoarder house.

== Response from each municipality ==
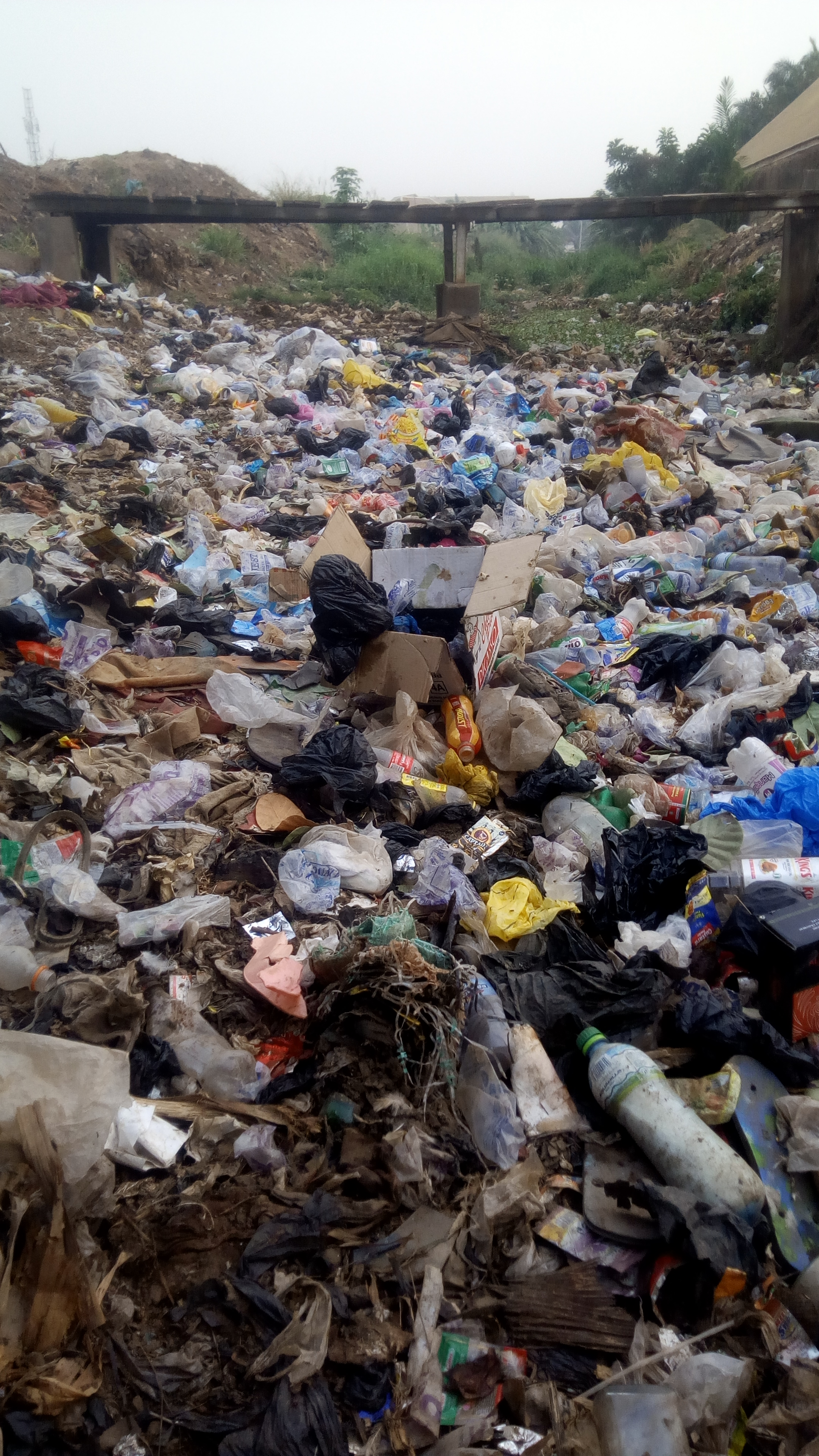
Waste disposal

If the presence of a hoarder house hinders public welfare, the garbage may be forcibly removed within the scope of laws and regulations. Based on this possibility, an increasing number of municipalities are enacting their own ordinances. However, few have implemented garbage removal through administrative enforcement, or subrogation.

In a case that occurred in 2008 in Mishima City, Shizuoka Prefecture, the government intervened with the justification of the Prevention of Elder Abuse Act because the well-being of an elderly woman resident was unknown. In Beppu City, Oita Prefecture, there is an example of a living environment improvement assistance program with a ceiling of 332 dollars (50,000 yen).

Regulations requiring landlords to pay for forced removal are established in Suginami, Ota, and Arakawa Wards of Tokyo. Suginami Ward, Ota Ward, and Arakawa Ward have established ordinances requiring landlords to pay for forced removal of garbage. In addition, Adachi Ward in Tokyo is in the process of enacting an ordinance that will allow the ward to bear up to 6,700 dollars (1 million yen) if the landlord cannot afford the cost of forced removal. However, it is rare in Japan for municipalities to subsidize the cost of trash removal.

According to the Mainichi Shimbun survey reported in its October 23, 2016 edition, among a total of 74 cities and the 23 wards of Tokyo, only 16 municipalities (16%) have enacted ordinances for dealing with hoarder houses. Experts have pointed out that the Japanese government should take measures for hoarder houses rather than leaving them up to local governments, as the formation of hoarder houses can happen to anyone, not just the elderly.

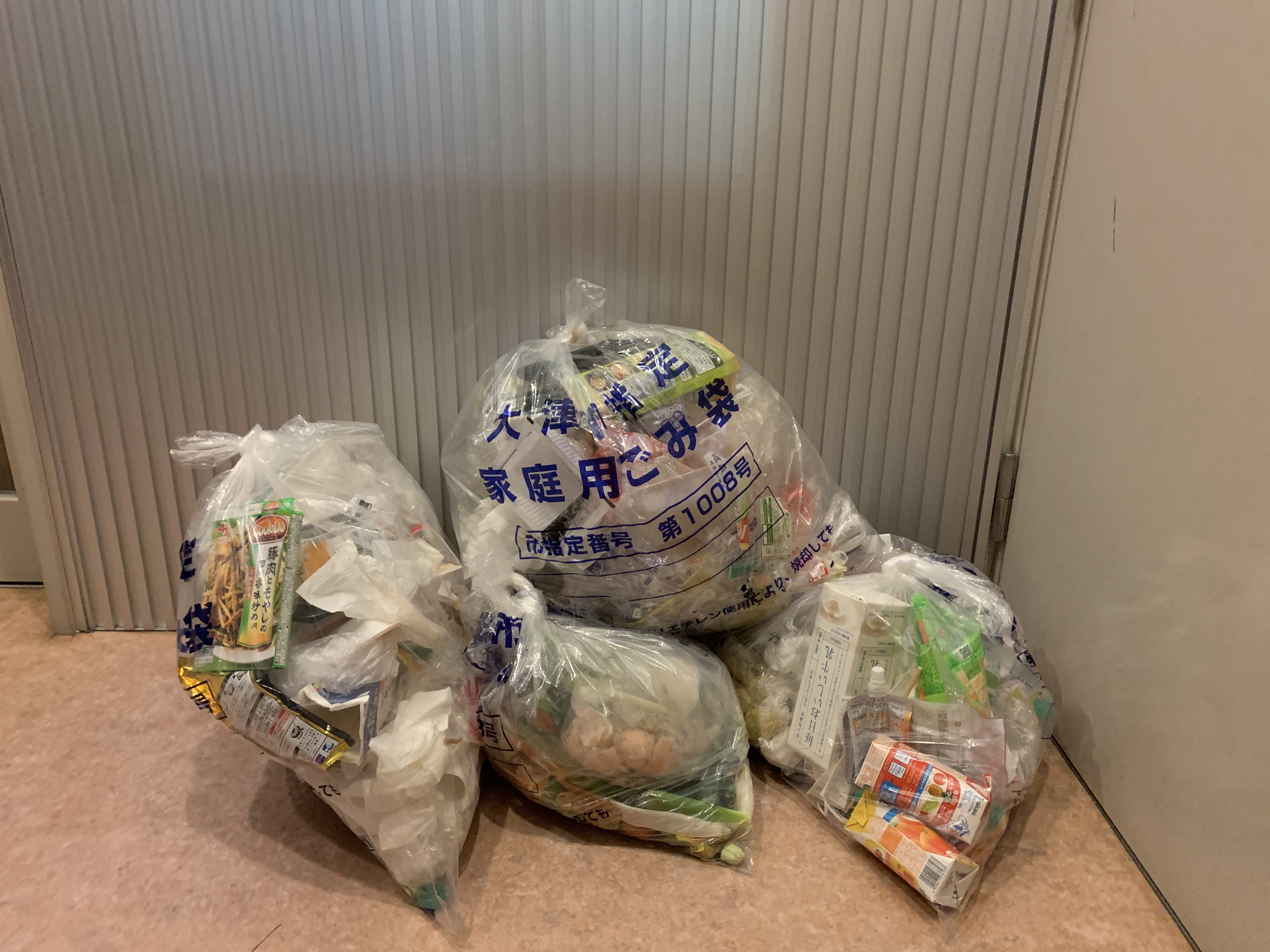
Garbage

In November 2014, Kyoto City enacted the “Kyoto City Ordinance on Support and Measures to Eliminate Defective Living Environments,” and on November 13, 2015, the city removed garbage piled up in front of the house entrance of a man in his 50s through administrative subrogation. This is the first time in Japan that garbage left on private property was forcibly removed. The reason for the removal was that the garbage in the passageway in front of the entrance was piled up nearly two meters (6 ft 7 in), as it was judged that it would hinder the passage of residents living further back and could threaten their lives during evacuation or emergency medical transportation.
