= Compulsive decluttering =

Behavior pattern

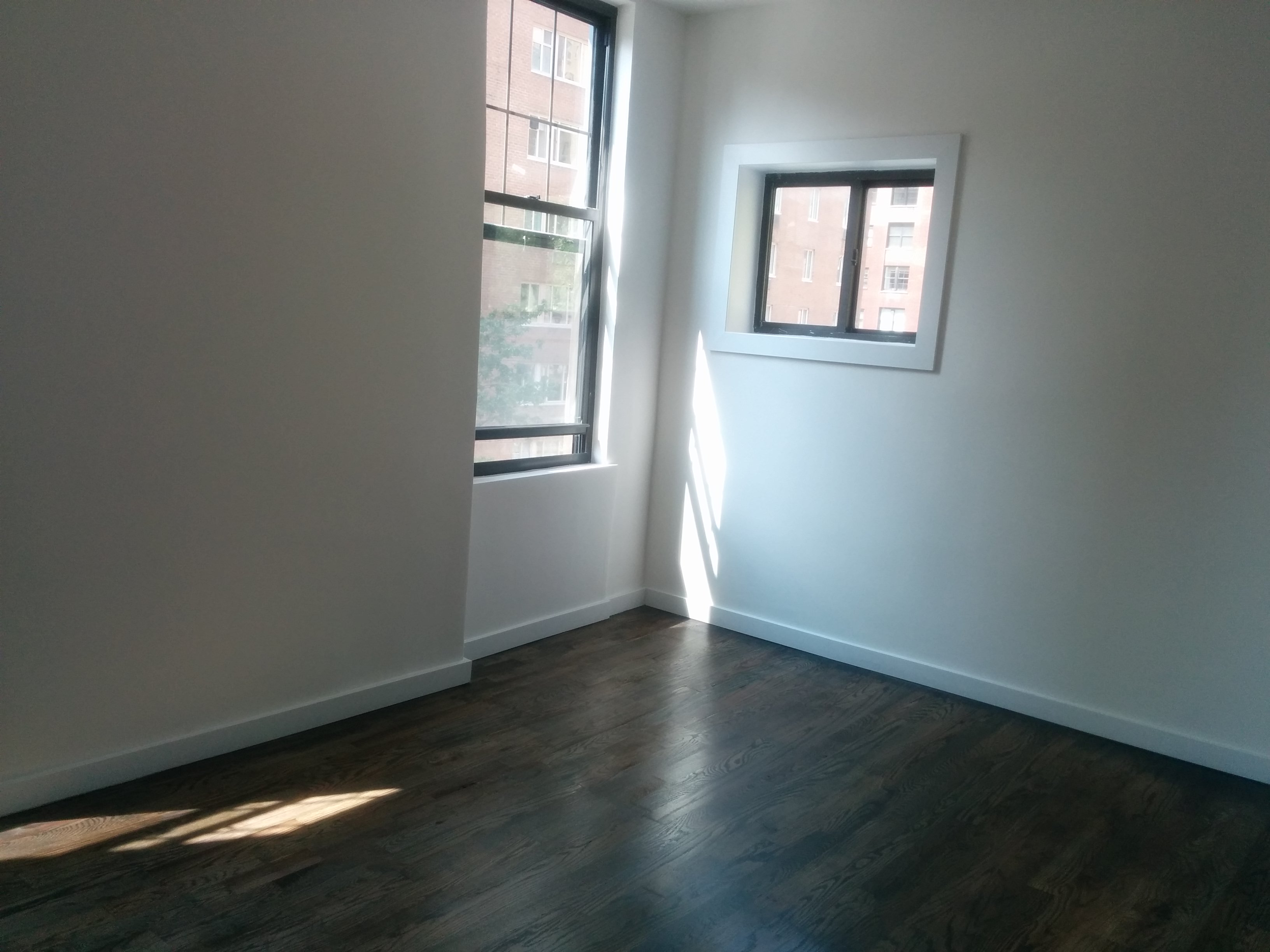
An empty room

Compulsive decluttering is a pattern of behavior^{de} that is characterized by an excessive desire to discard objects from one's home and living areas. The homes of compulsive declutterers are often empty. It is the opposite of compulsive hoarding.

Compulsive decluttering is a type of disorder that is classified within a broad name, obsessive compulsive disorder, or OCD. Compulsive decluttering is the act of throwing items, or clutter, away, or getting rid of them in an attempt to "clean up" what one with the disorder may think is cluttered. Even though it appears to be the polar opposite of compulsive hoarding, the two are related because they both fall under the umbrella of OCD in different ways.

Because a clean environment typically looks better and more organised than a "cluttered" one, people can get into the habit of decluttering, which can lead to the extreme of compulsive decluttering. People can often misunderstand compulsive decluttering with a typical spring cleaning, often due to the fact that somebody with the disorder tends to declutter year round. People that have compulsive decluttering disorder think that any items around them are cluttering or disrupting their everyday lives. Throwing these items away gives them satisfaction, and gives them the idea that they are in control of their lives.

Other terms for this behaviour are "compulsive decluttering disorder", "compulsive spartanism", or "obsessive compulsive spartanism".

== Presentation ==
=== Signs and symptoms ===
Symptoms of compulsive decluttering include repetitive discarding of materials and consistent reorganizing of one's immediate surroundings. Some people with the disorder may question whether or not they have enough of particular items, and may never feel relaxed even if everything is in their desired "order." In some circumstances, a symptom is for the person to constantly feel as though they need to delete texts, emails, browser history, or photos from their electronic devices.

=== Effects ===
The effects of compulsive decluttering on one who has it can be significant. Because this disorder involves throwing away anything that causes discomfort, there may be a significant financial or social burden. This disorder causes people to think they are better off getting rid of what they currently have, because it is in the way, and buying a replacement if and when they need one. For example, if a pen is sitting on a desk, and it makes the desk look disorganised, somebody with compulsive decluttering disorder would most likely throw it away in an effort to declutter the desk, and when they need a pen to write with, then they would buy a new one.

When this process begins to repeat, it is a sign that they have compulsive decluttering disorder. The financial burden comes from the repetitive repurchasing of the things that people would otherwise own for a long time, and normally would not need to repurchase. Depending on the severity of the disorder, the items that are being replaced can get to be much more expensive. People may begin to get rid of and repurchase phones, furniture, and even jewelry. It may also include adverse social effects. People with obsessive decluttering may deliberately or unintentionally discard items that are meaningful to others, like family heirlooms or photographs. The effects of this disorder are similar to those defined by OCD, although they may manifest in significantly different ways.

=== Treatments ===
While there are no specific treatments for compulsive decluttering as of 2018, attempts at treatment are included in the different ways OCD is treated.
