= Grimefighters =

ITV reality television series

- Also known as: Celebrity Grimefighters
- Narrated by: John Sergeant
- Country of origin: United Kingdom
- Original language: English
- No. of series: 4
- No. of episodes: 51 (inc. special)

Production
- Running time: 30 minutes (inc. adverts)
- Production company: ITV Studios

Original release
- Network: ITV
- Release: 22 July 2009 – 13 September 2011

Related
- A Life of Grime

Grimefighters is a British television series on ITV which follows the life of people with particularly dirty jobs, including working in a sewer, being a binman and hygiene inspectors.

The series predominantly focuses on cleaners working in the areas of Wolverhampton and Barking and Dagenham. The series is narrated by John Sergeant.

== Transmissions ==
=== Original series ===
Series	Start date	End date	Episodes
1	22 July 2009	30 December 2009	24
2	10 August 2010	26 October 2010	11
3	11 January 2011	19 April 2011	13
4	30 August 2011	13 September 2011	2

=== Special ===
- Celebrity Grimefighers: TX 16 December 2010
