= Alexander Kennedy Miller =

American businessman (1906–1993)

Alexander Kennedy Miller (July 14, 1906 – October 23, 1993), also known as A. K. Miller, was an eccentric recluse who operated Miller's Flying Service in 1930, in Montclair, New Jersey, US. Miller provided mail and other delivery services by means of an autogyro, as well as listing "Expert Automobile Repairing" and "Aeroplanes Rebuilt & Overhauled" on his business card. In his later years he was known for his eccentricities, and his collection of valuable antique cars.

== Youth and education ==
Miller was the only child of a wealthy New York City stockbroker and wholesale merchant. He purchased his first Stutz automobile while still in high school. He soon purchased more Stutz cars from bankruptcy auctions and a number of autogyros from the military for a small fraction of their actual value.

Miller attended Rutgers University on a scholarship to study mechanical engineering. A note alongside his yearbook picture describes an occasion when he rode down the street on a motorcycle, without a coat, in the wintertime, going to the barber shop "for his quarterly haircut".

== Marriage and middle age ==
In 1941, Miller married Imogene Raymond (1917–1996), the daughter of William Everett Raymond and Maria Louise Cook.

During World War II, when Miller discovered he was too old to fly in the U.S. Army Air Forces, he instead joined the Royal Canadian Air Force, rising to the rank of captain. He taught tactical aviation and salvaged damaged aircraft, some of which he would go on to purchase himself and later sell.

== Vermont years ==
After retiring from the Air Force in 1946, Miller and his wife moved to a large farm in East Orange, Vermont. The house had no central heating, antiquated plumbing and limited electricity; hot water was created by metal coils inside the wood stove.

It is here that Miller's eccentricities began to emerge. He exchanged most of his cash for gold and silver bars and coins. He took his autogyro apart and stored the pieces inside an old one-room schoolhouse that stood on his property. Over the years, he constructed a large number of sheds and ramshackle barns out of scrap lumber and nails that he scavenged from various places. Inside the shacks, Miller concealed his trove of prized Stutz motorcars. While locals knew he had a Stutz or two, and Miller was known to other Stutz collectors, nobody knew the true extent of the collection.

Miller often drove considerable distances for good deals on auto or airplane parts. According to car aficionado Roderick C. Rice, Miller told him a story about driving a 1917 Stutz Bulldog (the first car Miller owned) to St. Louis to pick up an airplane wing. "A. K. said he brought it back, driving with the canvas roof down and the wing replacing it, strapped to two-by-fours attached fore and aft."

As time went by, the farmhouse and the farm in general became dilapidated. In keeping with his frugal nature, Miller himself usually drove beat-up Volkswagen Beetles and when one would break down or he grew tired of it, he would abandon it in his yard. The neighbors often worried that the Millers were poor, and sometimes made offers of charity.

At times, to raise cash, Miller would sell "spare parts" to other Stutz owners for their repair/restoration projects. However, rather than selling the actual parts (which he owned a large quantity of), he would painstakingly fabricate them himself from scrap metal, using his own cars and spare parts as templates. He was known to other Stutz aficionados as a shrewd but cheap businessman. David Brownell, editor of Hemmings Motor News said of Miller, "Every time you'd try to do business with him, he'd quote the Bible to an annoying degree. If you asked him whether he'd be interested in selling a car, he'd say, 'You're being covetous."

In the 1970s, Miller's father died and Miller inherited the estate in Montclair and the family fortune.

== Death and treasure ==
What this miserly lifestyle and ill-kept property hid was eventually to bring $2.18 million at auction in 1996. The 87-year-old A.K. Miller himself died in 1993 after falling from a ladder, and Imogene died of a heart attack in 1996. As no heirs were found, the IRS moved in to assess the value of the estate (taking a particular interest in collecting the years of back taxes the Millers had owed).

All told, approximately 30 original Stutz motorcars, a Stanley Steamer, a 1926 Rolls-Royce Silver Ghost, several Franklins, a Volkswagen Karmann Ghia (which had somehow been placed in the loft of the main barn), and assorted VW Beetles were discovered about the property. The main barn and the various sheds and shacks Miller had constructed over the years hid a fortune in antique vehicles and a huge number of spare parts Miller had purchased from the Stutz company when it went out of business.

A further $1 million in gold bullion was discovered hidden in the wood pile. About $900,000 in stock certificates, and $75,000 in silver bullion and coins were also uncovered in various safes and crawl spaces.

A huge, 3-day auction was held by Christie's Auction House to liquidate the Miller estate, including the cache of antique and other automobiles, and a cache of other collected items including music boxes (one of which sold for $7,040), typewriters, sewing machines, spool cabinets, and other assorted mini-collections. Today, the A.K. Miller collection is recognized as one of the largest and best-known collections of Stutz motorcars.

== See also ==
- Eccentricity (behavior)
- Compulsive hoarding
- Edmund Trebus
- Collyer brothers
