= Edmund Trebus =

Polish-born hoarder (1918–2002)

- Edmund Trebus in 2002
- Born: Edmund Zygfryd Trebus; 11 November 1918; Ostrowo near Danzig, German Reich
- Died: 29 September 2002 (aged 83); Southgate, England
- Known for: A Life of Grime

Edmund Zygfryd Trebus (11 November 1918 – 29 September 2002) was a compulsive hoarder who came to fame when he was featured on the British television documentary series A Life of Grime.

== Biography ==
Edmund Trebus was born in Ostrowo, near Danzig (Gdańsk), in what was then the newly established Weimar Republic (now Poland), on 11 November 1918, the day of the Armistice.

When Nazi Germany invaded Poland in 1939 Trebus was conscripted into the Wehrmacht. He was then captured and served with the Allied forces in Italy, in an anti-tank unit of the II Corps of the Polish armed forces, which was under British command.

After moving to England just after the Second World War, Trebus married Jozefa Noga in 1949. They had five children.

Trebus had been a collector all his life and he was often seen pushing a handcart filled with his latest acquisitions, which he carefully sorted into separate piles in his garden and home. One of Trebus's major loves was Elvis Presley, and he managed to collect and store away a copy of almost every single Elvis record.

In his eighties, living alone in a run-down house in Crouch End in North London, Trebus was constantly in trouble with the environmental health department of the London Borough of Haringey because of complaints about the rubbish surrounding his home. He lived in a tiny area on the ground floor of his house, surrounded by piles of rubbish, because he never threw anything away. In the BBC documentary series A Life of Grime, Trebus was repeatedly shown arguing with council workers who had been instructed to clear his house of the 515 cu yd (394 m^{3}) of rubbish it contained. He was eventually rehoused at the Trentfield Nursing Home in Southgate, where he died at the age of 83. Following his death, the BBC broadcast an hour-long tribute, Mr Trebus: A Life of Grime.

== See also ==
- Alexander Kennedy Miller
- Collyer brothers
