= Hoarding disorder =

Behavioral pattern

- Other names: Compulsive hoarding, Plyushkin's disorder
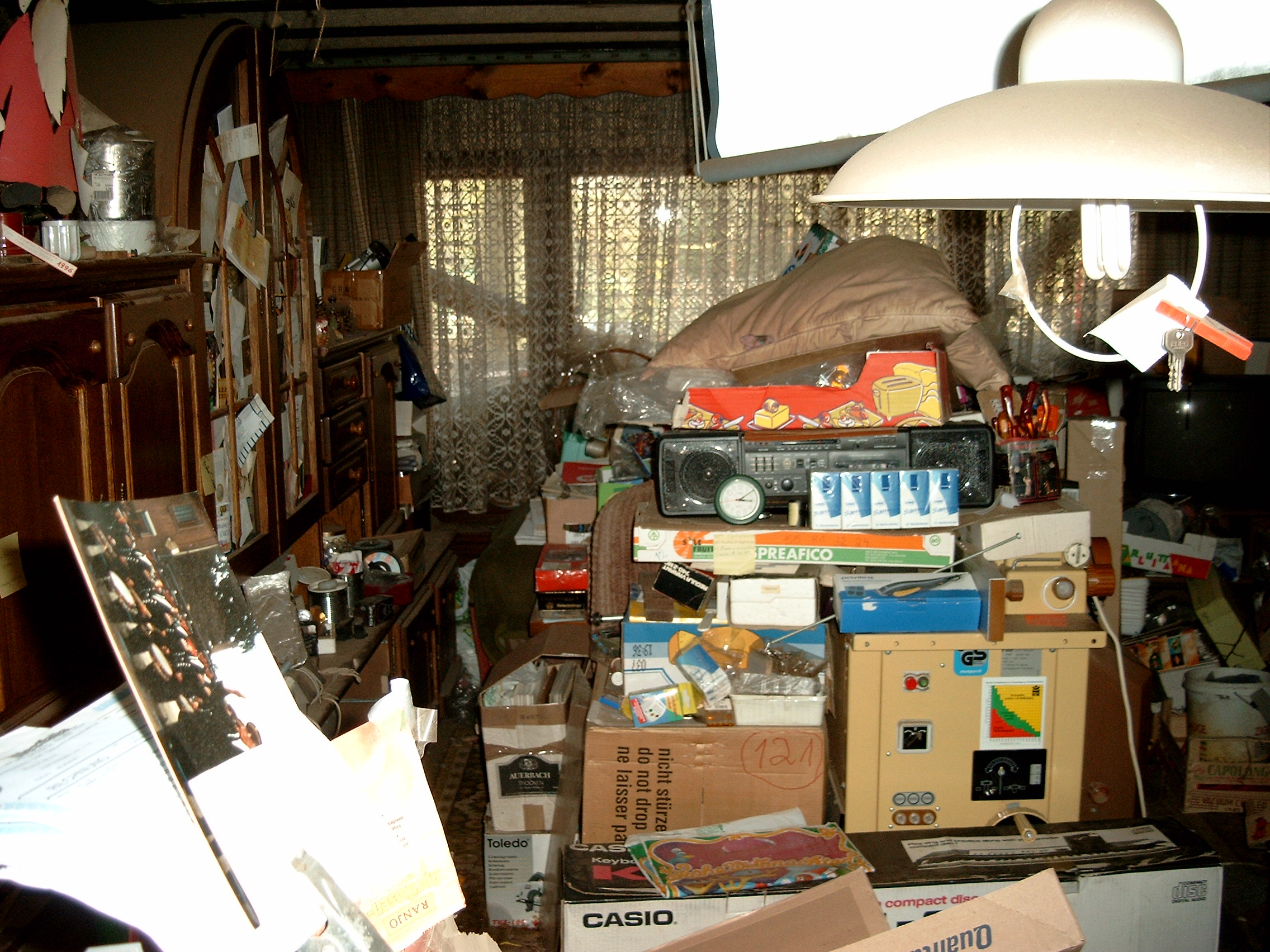
- Compulsive hoarding in an apartment
- Specialty: Psychiatry, clinical psychology
- Symptoms: Excessive acquisition; perceived need to save possessions; persistent difficulty discarding or parting with possessions, regardless of their actual value; intense urge to keep items and distress when getting rid of them
- Usual onset: Ages 11–15
- Duration: Chronic
- Causes: Not clear, possibly genetic, and stressful life experiences
- Risk factors: Traumatic events
- Diagnostic method: ICD-10-CM Code F42.3, DSM-5 300.3 (F42)
- Treatment: Psychotherapy
- Prognosis: Progressive
- Frequency: UK: 2–5% of population US: Up to 6% GER: c. 1.8 million

Hoarding disorder (HD) is a mental disorder characterized by persistent difficulty in parting with possessions and engaging in excessive acquisition of items that are not needed or for which no space is available. This results in severely cluttered living spaces, distress, and impairment in personal, family, social, educational, occupational, or other important areas of functioning. Excessive acquisition is characterized by repetitive urges or behaviours related to amassing or buying property. Difficulty discarding possessions is characterized by a perceived need to save items and distress associated with discarding them. Accumulation of possessions results in living spaces becoming cluttered to the point that their use or safety is compromised. It is recognized in the eleventh revision of the International Classification of Diseases (ICD-11) and the Diagnostic and Statistical Manual of Mental Disorders, Fifth Edition (DSM-5).

Prevalence is estimated at 2% to 5% of adults, but the condition typically manifests in childhood and worsens with advancing age, at which point collected items have grown excessive and family members who would otherwise help to maintain and control the levels of clutter have either died or moved away.

People with hoarding disorder commonly live with other psychological or neurological disorders, such as depression, anxiety, obsessive–compulsive disorder (OCD), autism spectrum disorder (ASD), or attention deficit hyperactivity disorder (ADHD). Other factors often associated with hoarding include alcohol dependence and paranoid, schizotypal, and avoidant traits.

== Diagnosis ==
=== Distinguishing hoarding from healthy behavior ===
Collecting and hoarding may seem similar, but distinct characteristics set the behaviors apart. Collecting is a hobby that often involves the targeted search for and acquisition of specific items that, at least from the collector's perspective, offer greater appreciation, deeper understanding, or increased synergistic value when combined with similar items. Hoarding, by contrast, typically appears haphazard and involves acquiring common items that are not especially meaningful to the person gathering them in large quantities. People who hoard keep common items that hold little to no meaning or value to others, unlike some collectors, whose items may be of great value to select people. Most hoarders are disorganized, and their living areas are crowded and in disarray. Most collectors can afford to store their items systematically or to have enough room to display their collections. Age, mental state, or finances have caused some collectors to fall into a hoarding state.

=== Clinical classification and diagnostic tools ===
In the DSM-IV, compulsive hoarding was listed as a diagnostic criterion of obsessive–compulsive personality disorder (OCPD), while other clinical instruments such as the Yale–Brown Obsessive–Compulsive Scale consider it to be a symptom of obsessive–compulsive disorder (OCD). However, in more recent research, hoarding was found to be no more specific to OCPD than to other personality disorders described by the DSM-IV; in addition, among all eight diagnostic criteria of OCPD, hoarding delivered the lowest predictive value for presence of the disorder. Compulsive hoarding also appears to be distinct from OCD: While being highly comorbid and presumably sharing familial risk factors, they can be differentiated by clinical, neurocognitive, and neurobiological parameters. Due to this evidence, hoarding disorder was established as its own diagnosis within the new category of Obsessive-Compulsive and Related Disorders in the DSM-5. Researchers involved in this categorization pointed out that the placement on the obsessive-compulsive spectrum may be subject to change as more studies on the etiology of hoarding disorder were needed.

The DSM-5 describes six obligatory criteria (A–F) for diagnosing hoarding disorder. It requires persistent difficulty in letting go of belongings, even when they have little or no real value (A). The aforementioned difficulty must be caused by a subjective need to keep items, and by distress at the thought of discarding them (B). Over time, possessions need to build up to the extent that they block or severely limit the normal use of living spaces, unless others step in to clear them (C). The behavior must cause marked distress or problems in daily life (D), and it cannot be better explained by another medical issue (E) or mental disorder (F). In addition to criteria A–F, the DSM-5 diagnosis allows specification of whether the affected individual also shows excessive acquisition behavior. A second specification concerns the level of insight the individual has into their disorder, ranging from "good or fair insight" to "absent insight/delusional beliefs".

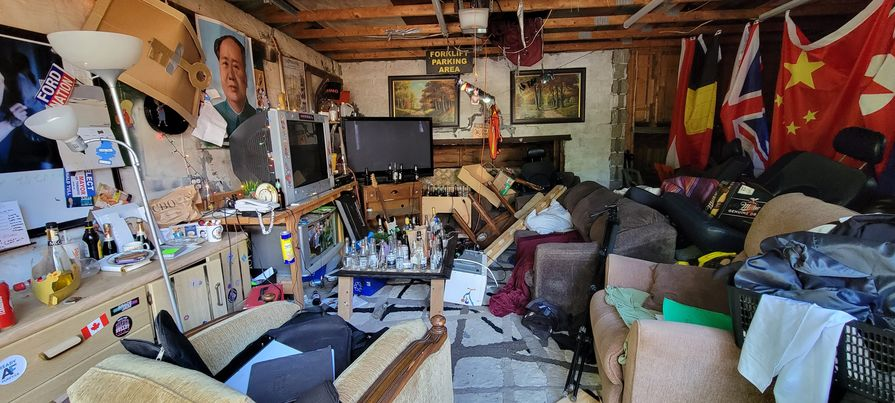
Hoarders may pile their belongings in their homes, yards, or garages. This garage has been converted into an additional room and demonstrates clutter, with a large number of objects of various sizes being haphazardly spread throughout the space. Exactly what constitutes a room or space as being cluttered varies from person to person.

Clinically assessing the severity of hoarding disorder may be challenging as poor insight can lead an affected individual to underreport the extent of clutter in their living spaces. Vice versa, other people on the obsessive-compulsive spectrum may perceive minimal clutter as a deeply distressing mess, and self-report as hoarders despite not fulfilling the diagnostic criteria. To allow a more objective evaluation, Frost et al. developed and validated the Clutter Image Rating as a visual measure, permitting patients to simply pick the images which resemble their own rooms most closely. This instrument has been adopted by institutions such as the charity Hoarding UK.

== Treatment ==
Cognitive-behavioral therapy (CBT) is a commonly implemented therapeutic intervention for compulsive hoarding. As part of cognitive-behavioral therapy, the therapist may help the patient to:

- Discover why one is compelled to hoard.
- Learn to organize possessions in order to decide what to discard.
- Develop decision-making skills.
- Declutter the home during in-home visits by a therapist or professional organizer.
- Gain and perform relaxation skills.
- Attend family or group therapy.
- Be open to trying psychiatric hospitalization if the hoarding is serious.
- Have periodic visits and consultations to keep a healthy lifestyle.

This modality of treatment usually involves exposure and response prevention to situations that cause anxiety and cognitive restructuring of beliefs related to hoarding. Furthermore, research has also shown that certain CBT protocols have been more effective in treatment than others. CBT programs that specifically address the affected person's or organization's motivation, acquiring new clutter, and removing current clutter from the home have shown promising results. This type of treatment typically involves in-home work with a therapist combined with between-session homework, which is associated with better treatment outcomes. Research on internet-based CBT treatments for the disorder (where participants have access to educational resources, cognitive strategies, and chat groups) has also shown promising results both in terms of short- and long-term recovery.

Other therapeutic approaches that have been found to be helpful:

1. Motivational interviewing originated in addiction therapy. This method is significantly helpful when used in hoarding cases in which insight is poor and ambivalence to change is marked.
2. Harm reduction rather than symptom reduction. Also borrowed from addiction therapy. The goal is to decrease the harmful implications of the behavior, rather than the hoarding behaviors.
3. Group psychotherapy reduces social isolation and social anxiety and is cost-effective compared to one-on-one intervention. Group CBT tends to have similar outcomes to individual therapy. Although group treatment often does not include home sessions, experimental research suggests that treatment outcomes may be improved if home sessions are included. Individuals have been shown to discard more possessions when in a cluttered environment compared to a tidy environment. Indeed, a meta-analysis found that a greater number of home sessions improves CBT outcomes.

Individuals with hoarding behaviors are often described as having low motivation and poor compliance, and as indecisive and procrastinators, which may frequently lead to premature termination (i.e., dropout) or low response to treatment. Therefore, it was suggested that future treatment approaches, and pharmacotherapy in particular, be directed to address the underlying mechanisms of cognitive impairments demonstrated by individuals with hoarding symptoms.

Mental health professionals frequently express frustration regarding hoarding cases, mostly due to premature termination and poor response to treatment. Patients are frequently described as indecisive, procrastinators, recalcitrant, and as having low or no motivation, which can explain why many interventions fail to accomplish significant results. To overcome this obstacle, some clinicians recommend accompanying individual therapy with home visits to help the clinician:

1. Get a better insight into the hoarding severity and style.
2. Devise a treatment plan that is more suitable to the particular case.
3. Desensitize affected patients to visitors.

Likewise, certain cases are assisted by professional organizers as well.

== Epidemiology ==
The prevalence of hoarding disorder is estimated to be between 2 and 6%, although some surveys indicate the lifetime prevalence may be as high as 14%. First-degree relatives of those with hoarding disorder are significantly more likely to report hoarding symptoms, and hoarding likely comes about due to a combination of genetic and environmental factors.

Rates of hoarding increase significantly with age, and people over the age of 54 are three times as likely to meet criteria for hoarding disorder. However, hoarding symptoms typically manifest in early childhood, and worsen to the point of becoming clinically significant during middle age. Over half of hoarders report the onset of hoarding as being associated with a traumatic life event, and in this portion of hoarders, the age of onset is much higher. Epidemiological studies have found that hoarding is twice as common in males, although clinical studies on hoarding tend to be predominantly female, suggesting that male hoarders are a significantly understudied and under-treated population.

Hoarding is a significant problem around the world and can pose a public health risk when hoarding escalates enough to damage the integrity of a structure or attract vermin. Accumulated items can block exits during fires and increase the risk of injury. In Japan, hoarder houses are known as "garbage mansions" (ごみ屋敷, gomi yashiki), and have become a topic of public alarm in Japanese mass media. In the Eastern United States, they are sometimes called Collyer mansions or Collyers, after the infamous Collyer brothers.

=== Comorbidity ===
Hoarding does frequently co-occur with OCD. OCD patients with hoarding symptoms were found to display a distinct form of hoarding in which they were more likely to hoard "bizarre items" and perform compulsive rituals associated with their hoarding behavior, such as rituals around checking items or rituals to be performed before discarding them.

Hoarding has been found to be correlated with major depressive disorder, social anxiety disorder, compulsive grooming disorders such as trichotillomania, bipolar disorder, reduced cognitive and affective empathy, and compulsive buying disorder. Hoarders have higher than average rates of traumatic past events, particularly those associated with loss or deprivation. Past events that occurred before the onset of hoarding are correlated with a subject's emotional attachment to physical objects, and past events after the onset of hoarding increase a subject's anxiety around memory. Hoarders are also more likely to have a past with alcohol abuse.

The prevalence of different comorbidities is influenced by gender. In men, hoarding is associated with generalized anxiety disorder and tics, while among women, hoarding is associated with social phobia, post-traumatic stress disorder, body dysmorphic disorder, and compulsive grooming behaviors like nail-biting and skin-picking.

== Society and culture ==
There have been several television shows that focused on those suspected to have hoarding disorder. Hoarders, an ongoing series by A&E, focuses on helping one or two individual "hoarders" per episode and features a rotating cast of professional psychologists and organizers who specialize in hoarding disorder. A similar show, Hoarding: Buried Alive ran from 2010 to 2014 on TLC. Hoarders: Canada followed a similar format to Hoarders and Hoarding: Buried Alive. Britain's Biggest Hoarders is an ongoing series hosted by Jasmine Harman, the daughter of a hoarder, and follows her as she and a team of experts seek to help others with the disorder. The Hoarder Next Door is a four-part series based in Britain that followed a group of hoarders participating in a treatment program led by psychotherapist Stelios Kiosses. Confessions: Animal Hoarding is a six-episode series aired on Animal Planet that focused on those who hoard animals and their living conditions. Hoarder House Flippers is more focused on the hoarded house, where teams work hard to flip properties that have been hoarded.

There have been possible depictions of hoarding in literature before the diagnosis was created. In Nikolai Gogol's book Dead Souls (1842), wealthy Plyushkin displays hoarding behaviors. For example, he serves an old cake from years ago to a business partner, having a servant scrape off the mold. He is famous among the locals for his compulsion to find and keep items.

Le Cousin Pons, a novella written by Honoré de Balzac in 1846, features Pons, who hoards art and antiques. He collected relatively low-value items, hoping they would become more valuable with time. However, he is unwilling to part with any of his items even when he becomes destitute. He dies with his collection intact.

In Charles Dickens's Bleak House (1852-53), London shop owner Krook hoards items, primarily legal documents. He continues to buy items but doesn't sell any, even though he claims he buys to sell later for a profit. Several documents that would resolve a legal case central to the novel's plot are lost among his hoard.

== Research directions ==
In a 2010 study using data from self-reports of hoarding behavior from 751 participants, it was found most reported the onset of their hoarding symptoms between the ages of 11 and 20 years old, with 70% reporting the behaviors before the age of 21. Fewer than 4% of people reported the onset of their symptoms after the age of 40. The data showed that compulsive hoarding usually begins early, but often does not become more prominent until after age 40. Different reasons have been given for this, such as the effects of family presence earlier in life and limits on hoarding imposed by housing situation and lifestyle. The understanding of early onset hoarding behavior may help in the future to better distinguish hoarding behavior from "normal" childhood collecting behaviors.

A second key part of this study was to determine if stressful life events are linked to the onset of hoarding symptoms. Similar to self-harming, traumatized persons may create a problem for themselves in order to avoid their real anxiety or trauma. Facing their real issues may be too difficult for them, so they create an artificial problem (in their case, hoarding) and prefer to battle with it rather than determine, face, or do something about their real anxieties. Hoarders may suppress their psychological pain by hoarding. The study shows that adults who hoard report a greater lifetime incidence of having possessions taken by force, forced sexual activity as either an adult or a child, including forced sexual intercourse, and being physically handled roughly during childhood, thus proving traumatic events are positively correlated with the severity of hoarding. For each five years of life the participant would rate the severity of their hoarding symptoms from 1 to 4, 4 being the most severe. Of the participants, 548 reported a chronic course, 159 an increasing course and 39 people, a decreasing course of illness. The incidents of increased hoarding behavior were usually correlated to five categories of stressful life events.

Although excessive acquiring is not a diagnostic criterion of hoarding, at least two-thirds of individuals with hoarding disorder excessively acquire possessions. Having a more anxiously attached interpersonal style is associated with more compulsive buying and greater acquisition of free items and these relationships are mediated by stronger distress intolerance and greater anthropomorphism. Anthropomorphism has been shown to increase both the sentimental value and perceived utility of items. These findings indicate that individuals may over-value their possessions to compensate for thwarted interpersonal needs. Feeling alone or disconnected from others may impair people's ability to tolerate distress and increase people's tendencies to see human-like qualities in objects. The humanness of items may increase their perceived value and individuals may acquire these valued objects to alleviate distress. Individuals with hoarding problems have been shown to have greater interpersonal problems than individuals who only excessively acquire possessions, which provides some support for the assumption that individuals with hoarding problems may have a stronger motivation to hang onto possessions for support. As possessions cannot provide support in the way humans can and because saving excessively can frustrate other people due to its impact on their quality of life, individuals with hoarding disorder may be caught in a feedback loop. They may save to alleviate distress, but this saving may cause distress, which may lead them to keep saving to alleviate the distress.

== See also ==
- Bibliomania, the compulsive collection and hoarding of books
- Clutterers Anonymous
- Compulsive behavior
- Compulsive decluttering
- Digital hoarding
- Diogenes syndrome, mental disorder characterized by extreme neglect, hoarding, social withdrawal and a lack of shame
- Hoarder house
- Hoarding
- Impulse control disorder
- Obsessive–compulsive spectrum
- Obsessive–compulsive personality disorder
- Transgenerational trauma

Hoarders

- Alexander Kennedy Miller, hoarded about 30 Stutz automobiles (1906–1993)
- Collyer brothers, Homer Collyer (1881–1947) and Langley Collyer (1885–1947)
- Edmund Trebus (1918–2002), participated in TV documentary
- Edith Bouvier Beale and Edith Ewing Bouvier Beale, American socialites featured in the 1975 documentary Grey Gardens
