= John Sergeant (journalist) =

British television and radio journalist and broadcaster (born 1944)

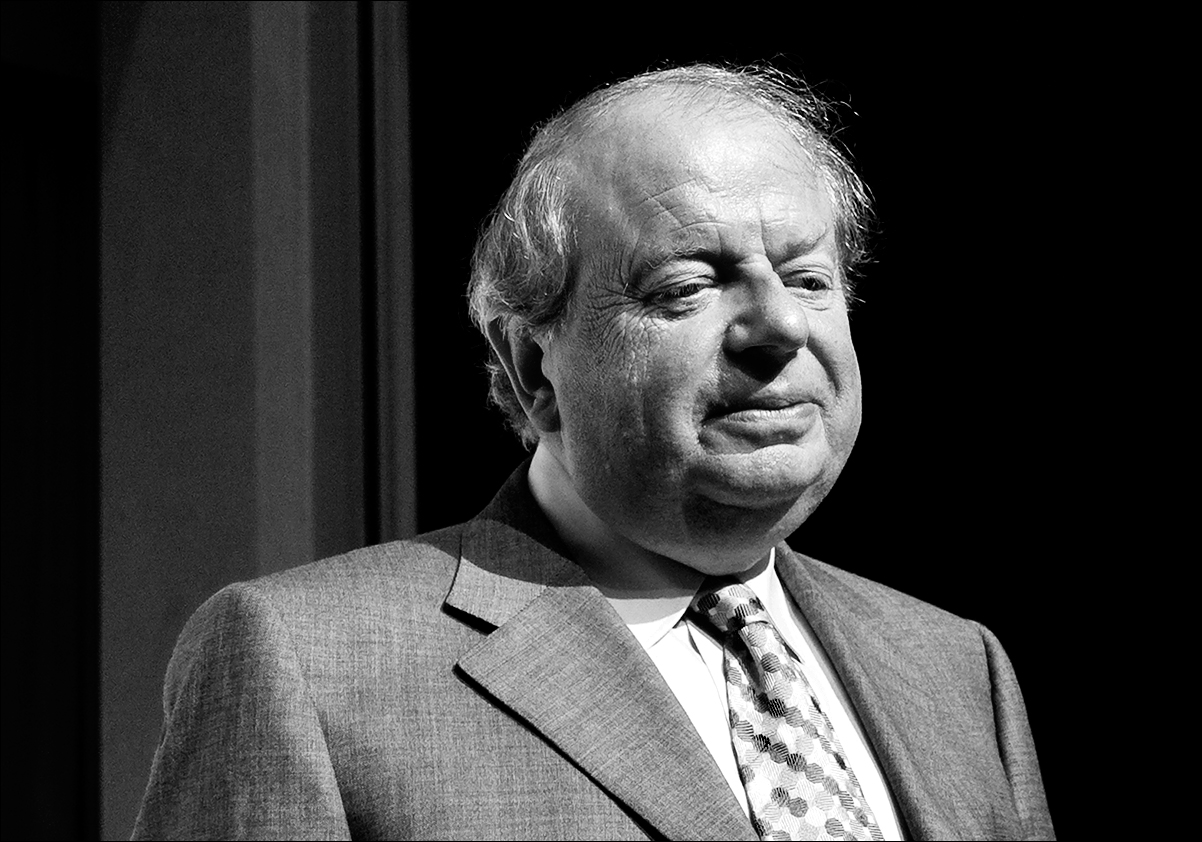
- Born: 14 April 1944 (age 81); Oxford, England
- Education: Magdalen College, Oxford (BA); Darlington College
- Occupations: Journalist, broadcaster
- Employer: Freelance
- Television: Strictly Come Dancing; The One Show; Grimefighters; John Sergeant's Tourist Trail; Argumental; Barging Round Britain; The Chase; Britain by Boat; Last Days of Pompeii; Tutankhamun with Dan Snow
- Spouse: Mary Smithies (m. 1969)
- Children: Two, including Mike
- John Sergeant's voice Recorded June 2010 from the BBC Radio 4 programme A Good Read

John James Sergeant (born 14 April 1944) is an English television and radio journalist and broadcaster. He was the BBC's chief political correspondent from 1992 to 2000 and the political editor of ITN from 2000 until 2002.

== Early life ==
The son of a missionary and linguist, Sergeant is of Russian origin on his mother's side. Sergeant's early life meant that he followed his father's work, and was brought up in locations including Jerusalem and Oxford. Sergeant was educated at Great Tew Primary School, briefly at the independent Bloxham School near Banbury, in Oxfordshire, and then at the independent Millfield School in Street, Somerset.

Sergeant graduated from Magdalen College, Oxford, where he studied philosophy, politics and economics. Whilst at university Sergeant performed in student comedy revues. After graduation he starred with Alan Bennett in a series of sketch shows on the BBC entitled On the Margin and wrote comedy scripts. He then trained as a journalist at Darlington College while reporting for the Liverpool Echo.

Whilst in Washington during his "gap year" he was present in the crowd to witness Martin Luther King Jr.'s "I Have a Dream" speech in 1963.

== Career ==
Sergeant started his journalism career as a correspondent for the Liverpool Echo where he worked for around three years before joining the BBC as a radio reporter in 1970. He was tasked to join the international desk, covering stories in over 25 countries. He then worked as a war reporter in Vietnam and Israel and reported the death of the first British soldier during the Troubles in Northern Ireland. He later covered the opening sessions of the European Parliament and became a political correspondent in 1981. He then worked on a documentary called "The Europe We Joined" and has presented BBC Radio 4 programmes Today and The World at One. Having progressed through newspaper, radio and television journalism, he became the BBC's chief political correspondent from 1992 until 2000.

In 2000, Sergeant joined ITN as political editor, replacing the retiring Michael Brunson. Sergeant retired himself in 2002 and was replaced at ITN by Nick Robinson.

=== Highlights ===
In 1987, in Moscow following Margaret Thatcher, he made a comment implying that she had already started campaigning for the general election in June 1987, despite not having officially declared the contest. "I am serving my country", Thatcher replied.

One of his most memorable moments was when he waited outside the British embassy in Paris for Thatcher, in the hope of hearing her reaction to the first ballot in the 1990 Conservative leadership election, only to be pushed aside by her press secretary, Sir Bernard Ingham, when Thatcher emerged from the building. For this broadcast, Sergeant won the British Press Guild award for the most memorable broadcast of the year, beating Paul Gascoigne who had been nominated for bursting into tears during the Football World Cup semi-final against West Germany.

Another political scoop was gained when he was granted the only interview with the then Welsh secretary, Ron Davies, after he had been forced to resign following his "moment of madness" on Clapham Common in October 1998.

=== Strictly Come Dancing ===
Sergeant competed with partner Kristina Rihanoff in the sixth series of Strictly Come Dancing which began on 20 September 2008. Although he repeatedly finished bottom of the score board after the judges' votes, the public consistently voted to keep him in the competition, prompting criticism of the viewers' voting by the judges and some dancers. He left the show in week 10 following a farewell dance saying: "The trouble is that there is now a real danger that I might win the competition. Even for me that would be a joke too far."

=== After Strictly ===
Sergeant has appeared on television programmes such as Have I Got News for You. He was also a reporter for The One Show; when the hosts Adrian Chiles and Christine Bleakley were on holiday, Sergeant hosted the show alongside Myleene Klass for a week starting on 24 August 2009. Sergeant has been a guest in Countdown's Dictionary Corner with Susie Dent. In February 2009, he appeared on QI (series F, episode 10). In 2014, he became the narrator for the UK version of the interesting facts game programme, Duck Quacks Don't Echo, first series only.

Sergeant has since subsequently been engaged by Mentorn TV to produce a number of documentaries that include a three-part series entitled John Sergeant's Tourist Trail in which he asked the question "why do tourists come to Britain?" In 2013 Sergeant presented Tracks of Empire, a two-part documentary produced by Mentorn for the BBC, on the history and legacy of the Indian railway system, in which he followed the path of the early railway engineers of British India and also discussed the use of the railways in the extensive growth of India now. He was also the host of Argumental, a comedy debating game on Dave. In 2011 he was the narrator for the ITV television series Grimefighters.

Sergeant presented Britain's First Photo Album about the pioneering photography of Francis Frith. It aired 12–23 March 2012 on BBC Two. Frith travelled through Britain in Victorian times capturing life in photographic form; many of his pictures were subsequently sold as picture postcards.

In 2015, Sergeant began presenting the factual ITV series Barging Round Britain with John Sergeant (also shown under the alternative title Britain's Best Canals with John Sergeant). The programme returned for a second series in April 2016.

In 2023, Sergeant appeared in the Channel 5 series The Big Steam Adventure alongside Peter Davison and steam buff Paul "Piglet" Middleton.

== Personal life ==
Whilst appearing on the ITV game show The Chase, Sergeant made clear the one memory he has over his many years of experience in broadcasting is when he was a young man working in Washington, D.C.; he heard Martin Luther King Jr.'s 1963 speech "I Have a Dream" live, at the Lincoln Memorial.

He was president of the Johnson Society in 2003 and has been president of the Arthur Ransome Society since 2023. Interviewed by Sophie Lam in The Independent in June 2008 about his holiday memories, he stated: "I'm programmed not to be disappointed by holidays." He has two sons, Will and Mike: the latter is also a journalist, working at the BBC as a reporter. Sergeant once saved his son's life after Mike began choking on a 50p coin at a restaurant aged two. Sergeant managed to dislodge the coin with his first aid knowledge.

Sergeant was presented with an honorary doctor of letters by University of Lincoln chancellor Victor Adebowale on 3 September 2013 at in Lincoln Cathedral.

Media offices
Preceded by Michael Brunson	Political Editor of ITN; 2000–2002	Succeeded by Nick Robinson
