= A Life of Grime =

BBC reality television series

- Genre: Reality
- Narrated by: John Peel (1999–2004); Arthur Smith (2005-06)
- Opening theme: "What a Wonderful World"
- Countries of origin: United Kingdom; United States
- Original language: English

Production
- Production locations: Series 1 & 4 - Haringey; Series 2 - Sheffield; Series 3 - Salford; Series 5 - Bristol; Series 6 - New York City; Series 7 - Tower Hamlets; Series 8 - Edinburgh
- Camera setup: Single-camera
- Running time: 25 minutes

Original release
- Network: BBC One
- Release: April 20, 1999 – July 20, 2006

Related
- Grimefighters

A Life of Grime (a play on the expression A Life of Crime) is a BBC reality series following the work of environmental health inspectors. Launched during an explosion of reality television, the idea found something of a cult following.

== Overview ==
With Louis Armstrong's "What a Wonderful World" as the title music, the episodes were narrated by John Peel and later by Arthur Smith in sardonic tones. Its appeal was based on disgust and the eccentric but often vivid and eloquent characters, most famously Edmund Trebus, encountered either hoarding rubbish or keeping huge numbers of animals. The original series was set in Haringey; subsequent series have been set in Bristol, Salford, Sheffield, Tower Hamlets, City of Westminster, New York and Edinburgh.

== U.S. version ==
An American version of the series titled A Life of Grime New York, aired on the Discovery Times Channel that takes place in New York.

== Syndication ==
Both A Life of Grime and A Life of Grime New York have been aired on UKTV People.
