= Model Behaviour (TV series) =

- Genre: Reality
- Narrated by: Vernon Kay
- Country of origin: United Kingdom
- Original language: English
- No. of series: 2
- No. of episodes: 28

Production
- Running time: 60 minutes (inc. adverts)
- Production company: Princess Productions

Original release
- Network: Channel 4
- Release: 26 September 2001 – 15 November 2002

Model Behaviour is a British television reality show which aired on Channel 4 between 26 September 2001 and 15 November 2002. The show featured a search for a new model with the winner securing a year's contract with a top model agency. The programme was produced by Princess Productions and was similar in format to ITV's Popstars in that it followed the fortunes of several individuals as they lived together and competed for the top prize. The first series followed five women who had been picked from thousands of applicants. The second series followed both male and female potential models. The 2001 series was won by Jenny Richards, a young mother from South Wales who won a year's contract with the Premier agency. and went on to have a successful career as a catwalk model.

The 2002 winners were South African Nathan Roberts, and Camilla Priest from Sunderland, who both won a year's contract with Select. The then-unknown Cheeky Girls also auditioned for the 2002 series, with the judges sceptical that the pair were actually interested in modelling careers as opposed to simply getting on TV, and commenting that they "look like they need a good meal".

== Transmissions ==
Series	Start date	End date	Episodes
1	26 September 2001	2 November 2001	11
2	25 September 2002	15 November 2002	17
