= Timeline of radio in Manchester =

This is a timeline of the development of radio in Greater Manchester, from when the first local station for the area began broadcasting.

== Before 1970 ==
- 1922
  - 15 November – The British Broadcasting Company begins regular radio broadcasts from its Manchester station 2ZY at the Metropolitan-Vickers works in Trafford Park. It broadcasts the BBC's first children's programme.
- 1930
  - 9 March – The BBC National Programme launches, replacing the usage of "call signs" and 2ZY became known as "the Manchester Programme".
- 1931
  - 17 May – The high-powered station at Moorside Edge opens and the output from Manchester becomes the core of the BBC North Regional Programme.
- 1939
  - Upon the outbreak of World War II, the BBC closes both existing National and Regional radio programmes to replace them with a single channel known as the BBC Home Service. The transmitter network is synchronised on 668 kHz and 767 kHz in order to use the other frequencies for propaganda broadcasts in foreign languages.
- 1945
  - 29 July – The BBC reactivates the Regional Programme but keeps the name "Home Service" (until 30 September 1967, when the station becomes BBC Radio 4).

== 1970s and 1980s ==
- 1970
  - 10 September – BBC Radio Manchester launches at 6am. The station initially only broadcasts on VHF.
- 1971
  - No events.
- 1972
  - BBC Radio Manchester begins broadcasting on MW.
- 1973
  - No events.
- 1974
  - 2 April – Piccadilly Radio begins broadcasting at 5am.
- 1975 to 1982
  - No events.
- 1983
  - 3 October – The first of five trial stations, each operating for approximately two months in various parts of the Manchester area, and opting out of BBC Radio Manchester on weekday mornings, launches when BBC Radio Oldham makes its first broadcast. The trials operate in turn with only one on air at any time, meaning that the same frequency - 1296 kHz MW - can be used for each station.
  - November – Pirate radio station KFM begins broadcasting to Stockport.
  - 12 December – BBC Radio Bury becomes the second trial community station. and uses the 1296 kHz AM frequency in turn.
- 1984
  - The other community radio station trials take place. The station airdates are BBC Radio Trafford (24 February 1984 to 20 April 1984), BBC Radio Rochdale (14 May 1984 to 6 July 1984) and BBC Radio Wigan (three months from 30 July 1984).
- 1985
  - February – KFM stops broadcasting.
- 1986
  - No events.
- 1987
  - No events.
- 1988
  - 1 September – The Radio 1 FM 'switch on' day sees three new transmitters brought into service, one of which, at Holme Moss, covers the Manchester area.
  - 3 September – Key 103 and Piccadilly Gold launch. Piccadilly Gold is a continuation of Piccadilly Radio whereas Key 103 is a new chart station aimed at younger listeners.
  - 30 October – BBC Radio Manchester is renamed BBC GMR.
- 1989
  - Evening programmes begin on BBC GMR but the programming is regional as it is broadcast on all four of BBC North West's local radio stations. Local programming ends at 7.30pm with the regional output, broadcasting under the banner of Network North West, continuing until 12midnight.
  - 22 October – Sunset Radio begins broadcasting in central Manchester.

== 1990s ==
- 1990
  - 17 February – KFM begins transmitting legally to Stockport and the wider south Manchester area having been granted an Incremental Radio licence by the IBA.
- 1991
  - May – Network North West is subsumed into the BBC Night Network. Consequently, the evening programming heard on BBC GMR is the same across all ten of the BBC's local stations in northern England. Also, local programming ends slightly earlier, at 7.05pm (7pm at the weekend), although BBC GMR occasionally opts out to provide local evening sports coverage.
  - KFM is bought by Signal Radio and its new owners merge the station with Echo 96, resulting in the station being relaunched as Signal Cheshire with a coverage area which includes much of the county of Cheshire.
- 1992
  - Soul Nation Radio and The Super Station broadcast across Manchester on 104.6 FM and 97.7 FM.
- 1993
  - BBC GMR stops broadcasting on MW.
  - August – Sunset 102 stops broadcasting and two months later the station goes into liquidation. The liquidator reapplies for the licence but loses to Faze FM which launches a dance station on the frequency the following year.
- 1994
  - March – Manchester United Radio launches.
  - 20 June – Fortune 1458 launches in Manchester, headed by former Piccadilly Radio boss Colin Walters. The station uses BBC Radio Manchester's old MW frequency.
  - 1 September – 100.4 Jazz FM begins broadcasting. It covers all of north west England and is one of the first five regional stations to be licensed across the UK.
  - 16 October – Kiss 102 begins broadcasting.
- 1995
  - No events.
- 1996
  - May – A second FM transmitter is launched for BBC GMR. Radiating from Saddleworth on 104.6 FM, it provides better coverage to the Upper Tame Valley.
  - 3 June – Asian Sound begins broadcasting on MW across the north west. The station's official broadcast area is east Lancashire but it can be heard across most of Greater Manchester.
  - 9 September – Following a change in ownership, Manchester station Fortune 1458 is relaunched as Lite AM.
- 1997
  - 1 April – Wish FM starts broadcasting to Wigan.
  - 29 September – Following the purchase of Faze FM, owner of Kiss 102 and Kiss 105, by Chrysalis Radio, Kiss 102 is renamed Galaxy 102.
  - For a brief period in 1997, BBC GMR broadcasts as an all-talk station called GMR Talk.
- 1998
  - 8 September – The north west's second regional station, Century 105, begins broadcasting.
- 1999
  - 2 March – Tower FM begins broadcasting to Bolton and Bury.
  - April – Radio Regen is launched in Manchester to provide training in community radio.
  - 30 August – The Revolution begins broadcasting to the Oldham, Rochdale and surrounding areas of eastern Greater Manchester.

== 2000s ==
- 2000
  - Signal Cheshire is relaunched as 104.9 Imagine FM and once again focusses on the South Manchester area.
  - Radio Regan operates a four-day station called Radio Longsight and on the back of the susccessul broadcast, ALL FM is created to broadcast to the neighbouring areas of Ardwick and Levenshulme, hence the acronym ALL.
  - 2 May – Lite AM is replaced by BIG 1458 AM.
  - 4 June – Manchester's local DAB multiplex, operated by CE Digital, goes on the air.
- 2001
  - 15 February – Fuse FM starts broadcasting. The student station broadcasts to the campuses of the University of Manchester.
  - 25 September – A DAB multiplex covering all of north west England begins broadcasting. It is operated by MXR North West.
- 2002
  - Capital Gold launches on MW 1458, the frequency previously occupied by Fortune 1458 and more recently by Lite AM and Big AM.
  - July–August – BBC North West operates BBC 2002, a temporary radio station set up to provide a bespoke service for Greater Manchester of the 2002 Commonwealth Games.
- 2003
  - ALL FM launches on a more permanent basis as part of the government's Access Radio trial of community radio.
- 2004
  - 13 February – 100.4 Jazz FM is closed down as research concluded that, any people were dissuaded by the name ‘jazz’.
  - 1 March – Jazz is replaced by 100.4 Smooth FM which adopts a mainstream mix of easy listening music although jazz music continues to be broadcast at night.
- 2005
  - Wythenshawe FM and ALL FM begin full-time broadcasting later they are awarded full-time community radio licenses.
- 2006
  - 15 March – XFM Manchester launches.
  - 3 April – BBC GMR reverts to its original name of BBC Radio Manchester.
  - 14 August – Gaydio broadcasts for the first time.
  - 13 September – Pure 107.8FM begins broadcasting to the Stockport area.
- 2007
  - 17 March - Oldham Community Radio 99.7FM launches as the community radio service for the Metropolitan Borough of Oldham.
  - 26 March – Smooth FM is relaunched as Smooth Radio 100.4.
  - 30 September – Tameside Radio and Salford City Radio begin broadcasting.
- 2008
  - 3 May – After 14 years on air, Manchester United Radio closes due to the club announcing that they had agreed a deal with local radio station Key 103.
  - 5 May – 106.1 Rock Radio launches. The station had originally applied to broadcast as Rock Talk.
- 2009
  - 30 March – Century 105 is re-branded as Real Radio.
  - Community station 96.5 Bolton FM begins broadcasting.

== 2010s ==
- 2010
  - 18 June – Gaydio begins broadcasting to the central area of Manchester on a permanent basis, two years after being granted a full-time community radio license.
- 2011
  - 3 January – 95.8 Capital FM London launches nationally and becomes available in Manchester when it replaces Galaxy 102. Other than daily breakfast and weekday drivetime shows, the majority of Capital's London-based output will be networked.
  - 5 September – 106.1 Real Radio XS replaces Rock Radio.
  - 8 October – BBC Radio Manchester moves from its Oxford Road studios and begins broadcasting from MediaCityUK in Salford Quays.
- 2012
  - 17 December – Ahead of cutbacks to BBC Radio Manchester, its weekly Citizen Manchester strand is aired for the final time, thereby ending its programmes for the Jewish, Irish and LGBT communities.
- 2013
  - 7 January – Due to the cutbacks within BBC Local Radio, BBC Radio Manchester no longer broadcasts its own early evening programming. Instead it broadcasts the BBC's networked evening programme.
  - 24 September – The north west's regional DAB multiplex MXR North West closes.
- 2014
  - 6 May – Real Radio North West is relaunched as Heart North West.
- 2015
  - 5 January – Magic 1152 is renamed Key 2 when it becomes part of the newly launched fully networked Bauer City 2 network. The revamped station is fully networked with the only local content being daytime news, weather and travel bulletins.
  - 30 August – As part of a trial of small-scale digital multiplexes, a small-scale multiplex in Manchester, operated by Niocast Digital, goes on air. Initially a nine-month trial, the multiplexes are now licensed until March 2020.
  - 28 August – A small-scale trial multiplex covering central Manchester, operated by Niocast Digital, begins operating. This multiplex is one of 10 trial multiplexes across the UK which cover areas much smaller than the county-wide local DAB multiplexes. Initially a nine-month trial, the multiplexes are now licensed until March 2020.
  - 21 September – XFM Manchester is replaced by Radio X.
  - 12 October – Sunset 102 returns after 22 years as The New Sunset Radio. Programming is similar to the original station and the relaunched station features many of the original DJs.
- 2016
  - March – Real Radio XS is rebranded as XS Manchester.
- 2017
  - November – Pure 107.8 is relaunched as Your FM, two months after the running of the Stockport community licence changed to a new operating group.
- 2018
  - 19 March – Local weekday evening programmes return to BBC Radio Manchester with the launch of The Dead Good Show.
  - 4 June –
    - Manchester station Key 103 is rebranded as Hits Radio Manchester. The station is a localised version of The Hits Radio with seven hours of local programming on weekdays - 6am to 10am and 4pm to 7pm - and a single four hour local programme at the weekend.
    - Key 2 is renamed Key Radio.
- 2019
  - 7 January – Key Radio is renamed Greatest Hits Manchester and becomes part of the Greatest Hits Radio network.
  - J uly – Local weekend programming on Hits Radio Manchester ends.
  - 2 September – Hits Radio Manchester's local programming is further reduced following the decision by owners Bauer Radio to broadcast Hits Radio Manchester's Drivetime show across all of Bauer's English Hits Radio stations. Consequently, the one remaining local programme is the weekday breakfast show.

== 2020s ==
- 2020
  - 23 March – BBC Radio Manchester, along with all other BBC Local Radio stations, adopts a generic schedule during the COVID-19 pandemic. All specialist shows being taken off the air. Each station broadcasts between 6am and 1am and overnight they simulcast BBC Radio London following a decision to suspend overnight programmes on BBC Radio 5 Live so that the BBC can broadcast a single UK-wide overnight programme. The BBC subsequently announces that these changes would become permanent as part of a bid to save £25m by 2022.
  - 16 November – Following the purchase of The Revolution by Bauer Media, the east Manchester station is closed and its frequency transferred to Greatest Hits Radio, thereby giving Greatest Hits Radio Manchester its first FM outlet in Greater Manchester.
- 2021
  - 26 April – Bauer switches off its Greater Manchester mediumwave frequency following the launch of Greatest Hits Radio on FM in many parts of the region.
  - 1 September – Stockport-based Imagine FM becomes part of the Greatest Hits Radio network following Bauer's purchasing of the three Imagine stations. Consequently, Greatest Hits Radio is now heard on FM in the southern parts of Greater Manchester.
- 2022
  - No events.
- 2023
  - No events.
- 2024
  - 22 April – Asian Sound is renamed Lyca Radio Greater Manchester following Lyca's acquisition of the station in 2023.
  - April – Just before the end of April 2024, Gold stops broadcasting on MW.
- 2025
  - 24 February – Radio X offshoot Radio X 90s replaces XS Manchester on FM. This is part of a wider decision by Global to end local programming in England following further deregulation which removes all obligations from Global to broadcast any local programming in England.

== See also ==
- Timeline of radio in London
- Timeline of radio in Northern Ireland
- Timeline of radio in Scotland
- Timeline of radio in Wales
