= TeamTalk (disambiguation) =

TeamTalk or TeamTALK may refer to:

- TeamTalk, a conferencing system which people use to communicate on the Internet using VoIP and video streaming
- TEAMtalk, a UK-based football website launched in 1996
  - TEAMtalk 252, a short-lived UK national commercial sports radio station, associated with the TEAMtalk website
