= Mark Crossley (broadcaster) =

British radio DJ (born 1987)

- Born: Mark Crossley; 22 April 1987 (age 38); Rotherham, South Yorkshire, England
- Occupation(s): Radio DJ, Broadcaster
- Website: www.mark-crossley.co.uk

Mark Crossley (born 22 April 1987) is an English Radio DJ, best known for hosting the evening show on national UK station Absolute Radio.

Crossley presented shows on BBC Radio 1 and Absolute Radio on the same day in May 2009 - and joined Absolute Radio three months later.

Crossley is a presenter on Manchester Sports and is the main sports presenter on BBC Radio Manchester’s Breakfast Show with Becky Want.

In September 2020, Crossley co-produced and co-presented the documentary podcast series Out Of Our League together with journalist Sanny Rudravajhala for BBC Sounds and BBC Radio 5 Live. The series followed the story of Bury FC and the formation of Bury AFC. It was nominated for Best Audio Documentary at the 2020 British Sports Journalism Awards and was fourth at the International Sports Press Association Awards for Best Audio and ranked third in Europe.
