= 252 AM =

AM radio frequency

The following radio stations broadcast on Longwave, AM frequency 252 kHz (1,190 meters):

== Algeria ==
- Alger Chaîne 3 - French language station, broadcast from Tipaza, Algeria. It broadcasts at 1.5 Megawatts during the day and at 750 kilowatts at night.

== Former stations ==
- Yle Radio 1 (Finland)
- Radio Tojikston (Tajikistan)
- Radio Rossii (Russia) - Closed down on January 9, 2014.
- RTÉ Radio 1 (Ireland) - following the closure of Atlantic 252 (1989-2002) and its short lived successor TEAMtalk 252 (2002) RTÉ began broadcasting its Radio 1 service on this frequency from 2004 aimed at the Irish in Britain. RTÉ Conducted Digital Radio Mondiale (DRM) tests on this frequency in 2007. In 2014, RTÉ announced to would end its AM broadcasting. However, this had been deferred on a number of occasions. Transmissions on long wave ceased on April 14, 2023.
