= James Stannage =

British radio talk show host (1950–2026)

- Born: Charles James M. Stannage; 22 February 1950; Norton, County Durham, England
- Died: 30 March 2026 (aged 76); Manchester, England
- Presenting career
- Stations: Manchester Radio Online, Key 103, Piccadilly Radio, TFM Radio, 96.2 The Revolution
- Time slot: 9–11
- Show: The Late Night James Stannage Talk Show
- Style: Talk
- Country: United Kingdom
- Previous show: The James Stannage Show

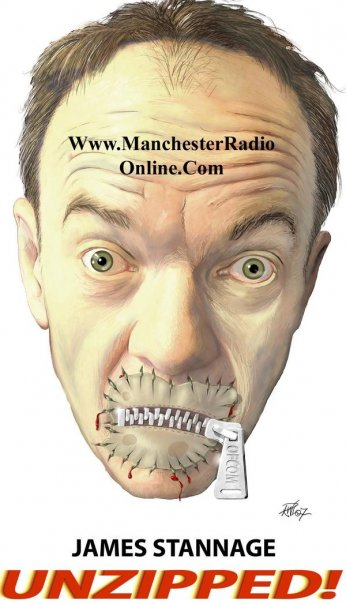
James Stannage

Charles James M. Stannage (22 February 1950 – 30 March 2026) was an English late-night talk show radio host. He presented The Late Night James Stannage Talk Show on Manchester's Key 103 until being dismissed in June 2005 after numerous warnings and a history of run-ins with regulator Ofcom. He went on to host an online radio show.

== Early life and career ==
Stannage was born in Norton, County Durham, on 22 February 1950. He originally started out as an amateur actor and secondary school teacher.

== Radio career ==
Stannage first worked for Piccadilly Radio in 1974 as an overnight 'grave-shift' DJ, merely putting on records and playing station idents and commercials. This progressed to his accompanying the music with dedications from night-workers - then onto receiving calls, leading to his, now renowned, late-night phone-in show. Occasional guests on the show were Mike Harding and Jasper Carrott. He was renowned for his abrasive and aggressive style even then, so much so that the Bishop of Salford publicly condemned him as a bad influence.

After leaving Piccadilly Radio, he went on to work for other local radio stations such as TFM Radio during the 1980s before returning to Piccadilly 1152 in 1989.

=== The James Stannage Show ===
His show was in the format of a phone-in where callers could discuss anything they wanted, from sport, religion, current affairs or politics. Stannage would often argue his case severely (which was usually anti-politics and anti-religion) if he disagreed with callers. Stannage was a well known fellow around Manchester as a result of his Key 103 talk show. In many surveys, Stannage came out as the number one Manchester DJ.

=== Fines ===
On 24 November 2005, EMAP Radio Group, owners of Key 103 received a fine of £125,000 (then a record for UK radio) after reading out comments and jokes submitted by a listener about the death of Ken Bigley (two days after his death was confirmed) in October and November 2004.

Key 103 received several fines during Stannage's 20-year career on the station, formerly Piccadilly Radio. One outburst cost £15,000 and in 2001, Stannage was questioned by police over allegations that he made a racist remark on his show.

In May 2004, he was censured because he read out listeners' controversially-worded emails in the aftermath of the death of Chinese cockle pickers in Morecambe Bay, 2004.

== The Milan Pub/Manchester Radio Online ==
Following his dismissal, James became a familiar face whilst working at his long-time friend, David Foran's bar, The Milan, in Harpurhey, North Manchester. It was here that Stannage became the first presenter on the new online radio station, ManchesterRadioOnline.com. Launching the station at 9pm on 9 September 2007 in rooms above the bar.

== Post-Milan... ==
James Stannage spent the remainder of his entertainment career with occasional guest appearances on TV and stage - but remaining loyal to his many new, and returning, listeners on Manchester Radio Online joined regularly in the studio by fellow presenters impresario, 'Dairylea' Dave Foran and James' former producer and 'shock-jock' host Tony Filer who became, for a time, James' wingman and stand-in.

== Personal life and death ==
James Stannage died from cancer on 30 March 2026, aged 76. He had two sons (Dominic and Darren) and two grandchildren. It was son Darren who confirmed his father's passing – announcing on Monday 30 March 2026, "He died peacefully this morning at MRI after battling cancer for over a year." He added that his father was "surrounded by people that loved him".
