= James H. Reeve =

English broadcaster and radio host (born 1950)

James Hengist Reeve, born 25 June 1950, is an English broadcaster, journalist, raconteur and radio phone-in host. Reeve has hosted shows on Piccadilly Radio, BBC GMR (now BBC Radio Manchester), BBC Radio 5 Live, The New Hallam FM, Talksport, TEAMtalk 252 stations and, up until July 2006, presented the late-night phone-in show at Key 103.

== BBC GMR ==
Reeve joined the Manchester BBC Local radio station GMR in April 1995, presenting the afternoon show. In April 1998, he rejected an opportunity to join new station Century Radio to stay with GMR. Just a few months later, he left GMR in controversial circumstances, with Reeve claiming he had been unfairly dismissed and had to explain complaints of "gratuitous use of racist language on and off-air."

== Career chronology ==
- Late 1970s–1981: Piccadilly Radio
- February 1986–mid-1994: Piccadilly Radio (Saturday Sport, late-night phone-in until 1989, then breakfast show)
- June 1994: Fortune 1458
- Mid-1994–April 1995: The New Hallam FM (now Hallam FM) (late-night phone-in)
- April 1995–September 1998: GMR (now BBC Radio Manchester)
- 1999–2000: Talksport
- 2000: 105.4 Century Radio (football phone-in show)
- 2002: TeamTalk 252
- June 2005–July 2006: Key 103 (late-night phone-in)
- May 2008: 106.1 Rock Radio
- September 2008–May 2009: 96.2 The Revolution

== Surgery ==
In July 2006, Reeve had his gall bladder removed at Manchester Royal Infirmary by surgeon Jon Bell, son of the late Colin Bell, formerly of Manchester City Football Club and England.
