= KFM Radio =

Pirate radio station in Greater Manchester

KFM
- Stockport; United Kingdom
- Frequency: 94.2 MHz

Programming
- Format: Contemporary hit radio

History
- First air date: 1984 (pirate); 17 February 1990 (legal)

KFM was a pirate radio station, and, later, a licensed radio station, based in Stockport, Greater Manchester, United Kingdom.

"KFM gained one of the early specialist music licenses and started legal programming on Saturday 17th February 1990. "

== History ==
The station was created by Alastair Bates and Charles Turner, who both also presented weekend shows. Charles Turner, in the 1970s, had been involved in a 'hippy' unlicensed pirate radio station called Radio Aquarius. Alastair Bates and Ian Walsh, in the early 1980s, had been involved in a Manchester station called RFM.

KFM's name on the business board was Mersey Valley Electronics.

Charles Turner used a frequency synthesiser transmitter of his own design and a stereo encoder designed by Trevor Brook (published in Wireless World in 1977).

The first broadcasts were test transmissions from pub car parks and the tops of local hills such as Werneth Low and Lantern Wood near Bowstonegate Farm in Higher Disley. Transmissions from Middle Hillgate and Goyt Mill came much later; the earliest broadcasts preceded 1983. The first broadcasts were transmitted from a radio mast at Bowstonegate Farm in Lyme Park. They were initially 2 hours long, pre-recorded at Ride Music Studio's and other secret locations on to a Revox B77 reel-to-reel tape recorder, then transferred to the boot of a car which was then parked at a pub car park near Disley. The broadcast of only two hours at a time made it difficult for government departments to trace the transmitter

KFM originally broadcast on 94.2 MHz FM from a studio on Middle Hillgate, Stockport with the transmitter and aerial at Goyt Mill, Bredbury in Marple, Greater Manchester from November 1983 to February 1985. The station was raided by the authorities several times, but was soon back on air each time.

Although a pirate radio station, KFM broadcast test transmissions for a number of weeks prior to going live and was featured more than once on Granada Television's "Granada Reports" news programme.

The original transmissions were in mono only but they rapidly moved to stereo output.

Phil Platt sang on the early KFM jingles which were written by Charles Turner with the input of Phil and Steve Ridgeway. Other jingles were produced by Alfasound.

The station had a mix of national and local music and its following grew rapidly. On weekdays it had an hourly news service (gathered from Ceefax pages). The station changed its studio location to Goyt Mill, where the transmitter was based. KFM aggravated its local well-established competitor Piccadilly Radio. Programme Controller Colin Walters said in a documentary on BBC Radio 4 that the station was "producing radio on the cheap" by not paying needle time, wages, standard business taxes, licensing fees etc.

As a pirate, KFM was eventually taken off the air by a raid from the Department of Trade and Industry, which enforced the Wireless Telegraphy Act's prohibition on broadcasting without a licence.

== DJs ==
KFM was functional by 1984 with a day-time line-up including DJ's Barry Neil, 'Jumpin' Johnny Owen, Dave Starr, Pete Wilde, Marcus Tarpey, Simon Richards, Pete Smith, Jon Guy, Craig Wood, Philip Gorman, Big Al Rockwell, Pete Best, 'Dodgy' Kevin Webb, Steve Maltby, Rob Charles, 'Naughty' Nikki Stevens and Stevie 'Megamix' King (with Wilf the Weatherman), Roger Taylor and Captain Flint.

One of KFM's early DJs and initial Programme Controller was Steve Toon, who also presented live music under the KFM aegis at the Brookfield Hotel along with Pete Best, KFM's Saturday Morning DJ. After becoming licensed it was an indie music station of the late 1980s and early 1990s, and featured Terry Christian, Jon Ronson, Craig Cash, Caroline Aherne, Neil Cossar, Spence MacDonnald and Joe Patricks in its line up (although, with the exception of Joe Patricks and Craig Cash, none of these were actually at the station in its unlicensed—'pirate' days. KFM's Rock show, presented by Simon Norton was sponsored by Jilly's Rockworld nightclub in Manchester.

Whilst an undergraduate at Manchester University, Adam Tickell (Clare Tickell's brother, was Pro Vice Chancellor at the University of Birmingham, now Vice Chancellor at the University of Sussex) frequently worked alongside Charles Turner in the early days of the radio station. Charles taught Adam the basics of DJing and how to produce music which would lead Adam to perform at local club nights. Adam Tickell was not described as being a good DJ but was very eager to learn whose passion made his performances the best they could be.

== Failure ==
Despite critical acclaim in its legal days it failed commercially and Charles Turner sold the licence to Signal Radio. It became Signal Cheshire, ownership was transferred again, to UTV Radio, and as of 2013 it broadcast as Imagine FM.

In February 2019, Mondiale Media sold Imagine Radio Stockport to Like Holdings and Helius Media.

== Relaunch ==
The KFM Radio name was revived in November 2014 with the launch of a brand new online station, kfmradio.co.uk designed and built in tribute to the original 1984 KFM. Designed to serve the people of Stockport and South Manchester and their friends and families all over the world, with a potential global reach on the World Wide Web. A multi genre station with some of the original 1984 team involved. It has since evolved streaming 24/7 and also has links with other online stations and listeners in many countries.
