= Greatest Hits Radio Manchester & The North West =

Radio station serving Greater Manchester

Greatest Hits Radio Greater Manchester
- Manchester; England
- Broadcast area: Greater Manchester
- Frequencies: FM: 96.2 MHz; DAB: 12C
- RDS: GRT HITS
- Branding: The Good Times Sound Like This; Across Manchester & The North West

Programming
- Format: Classic Hits
- Network: GHR North West (Greatest Hits Radio)

Ownership
- Owner: Bauer Media Audio UK
- Sister stations: Hits Radio Manchester

History
- First air date: 2 April 1974
- Former names: Piccadilly Radio; Piccadilly Gold; Piccadilly 261; Magic 1152; Key 2 Key Radio
- Former frequencies: 1151 kHz; 1152 kHz

Technical information
- Transmitter coordinates: 53°29′28″N 2°06′52″W

Links
- Website: GHR Manchester & The North West

Greatest Hits Radio Manchester & The North West is an Independent Local Radio station based in Manchester, England, owned and operated by Bauer as part of the Greatest Hits Radio Network. It broadcasts to Greater Manchester and North West England.

As of September 2024, the station broadcasts to a weekly audience of 341,000 listeners, according to RAJAR.

== History ==
=== Early years ===
The station began broadcasting at 5am on Tuesday 2 April 1974 as Piccadilly Radio on 261 m (1151 kHz then) AM/MW and on 97.0 MHz FM (from the same transmitter in Saddleworth that is now used by Hits Radio Manchester). The medium wave frequency moved to 1152 kHz on 23 November 1978 with the implementation of the Geneva 1975 plan. The station was named after Piccadilly Gardens in Manchester, and Piccadilly Plaza was home to the station's first studios until 1996, when it relocated to the Castlefield area of Manchester.

Piccadilly's founding managing director was Philip Birch, who previously ran the highly influential pirate station Radio London until it closed down ahead of the Marine Broadcasting Offences Act 1967 in August 1967. The first presenter on air was Roger Day – himself an ex-pirate radio presenter – and the first song played on air was "Good Vibrations" by The Beach Boys.

Many of Britain's best-known broadcasters started their careers at Piccadilly, including Chris Evans, Mike Sweeney, Steve Penk, James H. Reeve, Andy Peebles, Ray Teret, Gary Davies, Tim Grundy, Timmy Mallett, Pete Mitchell, Geoff Lloyd, Mark Radcliffe, James Stannage, Stu Allan, Nick Robinson, Karl Pilkington.

Journalist Paul Lockitt joined Piccadilly in 1979 and became the station's longest serving on-air employee, working as a producer, presenter and newscaster until his departure in 2017.

=== FM/MW split ===
Piccadilly Radio split into two services in 1988, with Key 103 broadcast on FM with a contemporary music format, while Piccadilly continued on AM, initially under its full service format, gradually adopting a 'golden oldies' music playlist as Piccadilly Gold.

In the mid-1990s, Piccadilly Gold became Piccadilly 1152 as the playlist moved away from "golden oldies" to a mix of classic and current easy-listening music. The late-night phone-in with James Stannage became the most popular radio talk show outside London, whilst the Dave Ward and Umberto breakfast show helped the station to become one of the biggest AM stations.

In 1994, a rival station, Fortune 1458 (later renamed 1458 Lite AM, today broadcasting as 1458 Capital Gold) commenced on BBC GMR's former AM frequency. Despite heavy marketing, and many ex-Piccadilly presenters on the new station, Piccadilly 1152 remained Manchester's most popular station, other than sister station Key 103, until the late 1990s when smaller, localised FM stations in Oldham, Warrington and Bury began to erode away Piccadilly's audience base.

=== Magic 1152 ===
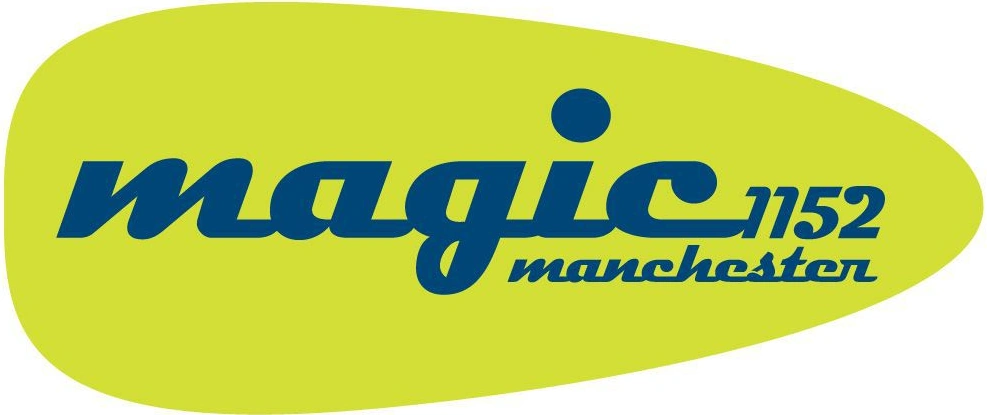

In 1994, Piccadilly (Key 103/Piccadilly 1152) were part of the Transworld Radio Group, which was bought by present owners Bauer Radio (then EMAP). In 1999/2000, parent company EMAP re-branded the station as Magic 1152, to fall in-line with the other nine Magic stations they owned across London and the north of England.

The idea of a corporate "Magic" brand of stations was seen to be beneficial when selling air time to national advertisers. This change in name also coincided with the 25th birthday of Piccadilly Radio. The station was branded as "Piccadilly 1152 – the magic of Manchester" during the transition. Except for a short spell in 2000 – when Key 103 was briefly renamed Piccadilly Key 103 – the Piccadilly brand was finally retired.

In December 2001, EMAP decided that it was more economical for the Magic network to share off-peak programmes. Magic 1152, in line with the other seven Magic AM stations in northern England, began networking 10 am – 2 pm, and 7 pm – 6 am by carrying programming from Magic 105.4 in London. During these hours, it was simply known as Magic, although there were local commercial breaks, and local news on the hour.

In January 2003, after a sharp decline in listening, the station ceased networking with the London station, and a regional northern network was created with the Manchester station providing networked output at weekends while sister station Magic 1152 in Newcastle provided weekday programming.

From July 2006, more networking was introduced across the Northern Magic AM network, with local output reduced to a daily four-hour breakfast show, local news and advertising. In April 2012, Magic 1152, inline with the majority of other Magic North stations, dropped local weekend breakfast shows.

Between March 2013 and December 2014, weekday breakfast was syndicated with Magic 1548 in Liverpool and Magic 999 in Preston.

=== Key 2/Key Radio ===
On 5 January 2015, Magic 1152 was rebranded as Key 2, as Magic FM in London went national on DAB. The station formed part of the Bauer City 2 network. All programming was now networked with the other Bauer AM stations in the North although local news, weather and travel continue to be broadcast as opt-outs during the day.

In June 2018, following the relaunch and rebrand of Key 103 as Hits Radio, the station was rebranded again as Key Radio, retaining the former local identity in a secondary capacity.

=== Greatest Hits Radio ===
On 7 January 2019, Key Radio rebranded as Greatest Hits Radio Manchester.

Following the sale of The Revolution in October 2020, the service is also broadcast on 96.2 FM from a transmitter in Oldham, primarily serving the Oldham, Rochdale and Tameside areas of Greater Manchester.

In February 2021, Bauer announced it would close GHR's medium-wave service on 1152 kHz, marking the end of 47 years of broadcasting on the former AM frequency for Piccadilly Radio. The AM transmitter ceased broadcasting on 28 April 2021.

On 17 June 2021 Bauer announced the purchase of Imagine Radio from Like Media Group, with the existing Imagine service slated to be replaced by GHR services for Stockport and North Cheshire and the Peak District and Derbyshire Dales. Consequently, Greatest Hits Radio can now be heard on FM in the southern parts of Greater Manchester.
