= Sporting Life (British newspaper) =

British newspaper published from 1859 until 1998 and later as a website

- Type: Publisher
- Owner: Hestview Ltd
- Language: English
- Headquarters: Leeds, England, United Kingdom
- Website: sportinglife.com

The Sporting Life was a British newspaper published from 1859 until 1998, best known for its coverage of horse racing and greyhound racing. Subsequently, it has continued as a multi-sports website.

Priced at one penny, the Sporting Life initially appeared twice weekly, on Wednesdays and Saturdays. It became a daily newspaper in 1883, and in 1886 acquired its rival, Bell's Life in London. In 1924 the newspaper sponsored the 1924 Women's Olympiad held at Stamford Bridge in London. The paper continued publication until its merger with the Racing Post in May 1998; a proposed relaunch was aborted in 1999.

On 20 December 1996, before the newspaper arm closed, Sporting Life launched an online version of the paper, sportinglife.com. The site was run as a joint venture between Trinity Mirror and the Press Association until PA Sporting Life Ltd was sold to 365 Media Group (then known as ukbetting plc, now a division of British Sky Broadcasting) on 14 October 2001.

In February 1998 the newspaper lost a High Court libel action brought by racehorse owners Jack and Linda Ramsden and jockey Kieren Fallon.

The Sporting Life was said to be the late Queen Mother's favourite newspaper. The eccentric racing pundit John McCririck was a journalist on the paper and later wrote a column for the website. In the popular television series Agatha Christie's Poirot, it was shown to be a paper read by Poirot's associate Captain Hastings.

== See also ==
- Horse racing in Great Britain
- History of gambling in the United Kingdom
- The Sporting Times
