= Laser 558 =

Offshore pirate radio station

- Offshore (North Sea); United Kingdom
- Broadcast area: United Kingdom, Netherlands, Belgium, northern France
- Frequency: 558 kHz AM
- Branding: Laser 558

Programming
- Language: English
- Format: Offshore pirate radio (Pop, Oldies)

Ownership
- Owner: Laser Radio (original), East Anglian Productions (later)

History
- First air date: May 1984
- Last air date: December 1985 (original); Easter 1987 (Laser Hot Hits)
- Former call signs: Laser Hot Hits (1986–1987)

Links
- Webcast: laser558.live

Laser 558 was an offshore pirate radio station launched in May 1984 using disc jockeys from the United States. It broadcast from the Panama-registered ship MV Communicator in international waters in the North Sea, off the Thames Estuary of the United Kingdom. Within months the station had a large audience, due to its strong signal and continuous music, mixing current records with oldies. However, insufficient advertising starved the station off the air in late 1985. In 1986 an attempt was made to return as Laser Hot Hits, but the same problems arose.

LASER558 Ltd was incorporated at Companies House on July 4, 2023 and became the owner of related intellectual property trademarks the same year covering name, taglines, and logo. LASER558 began online broadcasting as a 're-creation' station in July 2023 and obtained a DSP broadcasting licence from OFCOM. In January 2024, the station launched on Google, Apple, and Amazon apps, on Freeview via the radio portal, Alexa, Roku TV, Fire TV, amongst other platforms.

From 2024, original LASER558 disc jockeys Craig Novak, Rick Harris, Jay Mack, Erin Kelly, Jeff Davis, and Chris Carter returned to the station providing a full schedule of programming from 5 am until midnight.

== History ==
=== The beginnings of Laser Radio ===
A London car salesman and DJ named John Kenning convinced Philip Smyth, a wealthy Irish businessman, to fund an offshore radio station. Kenning recruited Paul Rusling, who introduced the project to Roy Lindau, who had been involved in Radio Caroline. Lindau was a marketing executive for Major Market Radio, an airtime brokerage owned by Gene Autry. He joined Laser in mid-1983 and became president of its sales company, Eurad. He left in late 1984 after disagreements over control. There were reports that the tobacco giant, Philip Morris, pulled out following pressure from European authorities, although their sponsorship of programmes continued to be announced.

The team planned two stations on one ship, the music programmed via satellite from the New York offices of Music Media International. This was scaled down to a single station called Laser after early disagreements on policy. The station was built on the former hydrographic survey vessel Gardline Seeker, renamed Communicator. The ship was registered via a Panama-based company, Deka Overseas Inc. The plan was to use an antenna held aloft by a helium balloon - an inflatable dirigible tethered to the deck.

The conversion work to install studios and transmitters was carried out in autumn 1983 by Paul Rusling at Tracor Marine in Port Everglades, Florida, and the ship sailed via the Azores and Ireland to an anchorage off the Thames Estuary.

=== Operations and antenna problems ===
The near non-stop music, "never more than a minute away from music", was in stark contrast to the 50 per cent speech imposed on UK commercial radio, and the similar proportion of talk on BBC Radio 1. The lack of advertising on Laser, plus the American DJs, resulted in a huge audience - BBC research indicated four million in the UK and a similar number on the continent.

By using only American DJs and claiming supply tenders from Spain, Laser claimed to be legal. Surveillance by the UK showed Laser was supplied from Kent, and UK stations campaigned to have Laser and Caroline removed, saying the ships were "stealing their listeners".

The early days were overshadowed by problems with the balloon aerial. Several balloons were lost to rough weather in the North Sea. The short-lived transmissions on 729 kHz could be heard in several countries but not in London due to a Radio 4 relay on the adjacent channel of 720 kHz. A change to two masts and a frequency at the bottom of the AM band (558 kHz) were effected for the station's launch in May 1984 as Laser 558.

=== "Eurosiege" ===
On 9 August 1985, the British Department of Trade and Industry (DTI) chartered the Dioptric Surveyor to anchor nearby to monitor Laser and Caroline, at a reported cost of £50,000 a month. It was replaced by the larger Gardline Tracker in November, a sister ship of the Communicator, which had been bought from Gardline Shipping in Great Yarmouth as the Gardline Seeker.

DJs at Laser made references to the DTI vessel, poking fun at the ship and staff. They made a parody record "I Spy For The DTI" by the Moronic Surveyors. The term "Eurosiege" was coined by disc jockey Charlie Wolf. On one occasion the MV Communicator moved temporarily away from the MV Ross Revenge only to be followed by the DTI, confirming that Laser rather than Caroline was the target.

=== Business failure and final broadcast ===
The New York agency MMI failed to secure advertising although London based agents took large payments for airtime on the station. The station attracted considerable "paid for play" advertising from UK and Dutch record companies, keen to have product heard by the 8 or 9 million listeners Laser 558 was attracting.

Due to the blockade and lack of funds, the MV Communicator went into port, escorted by Gardline Tracker, where it was impounded by the Admiralty Marshall on behalf of creditors, including Gardline Surveys who had sold Laser the ship, and Paul Rusling, its first engineer and coordinator who had sourced the transmitters and paid staff on behalf of the owner. The ship was offered for sale in a blind auction and, despite its cost being almost £1 million two years before, was sold for around £35,000. The monitoring exercise ended shortly afterwards, on 12 December 1985.

The day after Laser's closure, Radio Caroline moved from 576 to 558 kHz, a clearer frequency.

== Technical background ==
Laser played most of its music from tape cartridges as the American management wanted control over material broadcast. The former research lab at the stern of the ship was converted into two studios plus a newsroom, which contained a Kaypro 4 computer and telex link with the station's office in New York. This link was achieved initially by a COMSAT installation on the upper deck, which used Inmarsat; it could access regular telephones, although at $15 a minute. Later the ship used a private marine VHF channel to a base in Kent.

The broadcast transmitters were a pair of CSI 25 kilowatt AM transmitters, built in Boca Raton, Florida. Usually only one was in use at half power, due to the limitations of tuning components in the antenna. This was an "inverted L" array running up to the top of a 100-foot-high fore mast, and then across to a similar construction at the stern of the ship. Coverage was good with the "commercially marketable" core area of the signal travelling 140 miles over land, which included most of England, all of the Netherlands and Belgium and much of northern France as far as Paris.

The audio quality was a little better than most other AM broadcasters in western Europe, as the equipment had been set up to modulate with frequencies up to around 8 kHz, whereas many stations in the UK for example rolled off treble frequencies at 4.5 kHz. The programme feed was modified by an audio processor made by Circuit Research Labs of Arizona, while Radio Caroline (based on another ship nearby) used an Optimod processor.

Other media in the UK ran stories about who the owners might be, and in August 1984 the Evening Standard named a BBC TV journalist, Roger Parry and an Irish businessman, Philip Smyth.

== Aftermath ==
=== MV Communicator ===
After Laser Hot Hits went off the air in 1987, MV Communicator was again impounded. This time it was stripped of studio equipment, although the transmitters and generators were intact. The ship was sold several times and impounded by the Portuguese Government in Lisbon. In 1994, the ship was taken to the Netherlands. There she was refitted with a new 50-kilowatt transmitter and mast and broadcast programmes of Holland FM from a mooring on the IJsselmeer. The following year Communicator was sold to the Veronica Broadcasting Society, who used it to transmit a new national Dutch station - Veronica Hit Radio. When that moved to FM they sold the ship on to Quality Radio. The ship was then sold to Dave Miller's The Superstation, and taken to the Orkney Isles where she broadcast a local station on 105.4 MHz in 2004. The Superstation sold the ship for £1,000 following which she was beached near St Margaret's Hope pier in Orkney and cut up for scrap.

The full story of the MV Communicator's 21-year career as a radio ship was told in a 2016 book called Radio Adventures of the MV Communicator, published by World of Radio Ltd. The book features recollections and reminiscences as well as many photographs of the Communicator's crew of DJs, engineers and suppliers. A further book, published in 2017, is Laser Radio Programming, which describes how the format was devised, and how it was put into action - the hot clocks, the use of power words that sell, and other radio programming techniques.

=== Laser Hot Hits ===
The MV Communicator was bought by East Anglian Productions and left unhindered during restoration in Essex. The ship returned to international water in late 1986 and on 1 December began test transmissions as Laser Hot Hits using the 576 channel abandoned by Radio Caroline, since Caroline was still using 558. The station resumed broadcasting on 7 December. The ship had twin 25 kW transmitters and initially tests were heard with a powerful signal.

Laser Hot Hits lasted less time than the original and had poorer nighttime coverage owing to the less clear channel than 558. After losing masts in a storm in January 1987 it closed temporarily, and closed permanently at Easter 1987. Plans to relaunch the service were plagued by financial irregularities, the ship being taken over and finally a partial sale to an American entrepreneur, James Ryan.

=== On-air personalities ===
Most DJs continued to work in radio in Europe and the United States. These included the following:

- Charlie Wolf was from Boston, Massachusetts. He was working in Salt Lake City, Utah, when he answered an advert in Radio & Records Magazine, a weekly industry paper in the US. Wolf told friends he joined for a free trip to London. After Laser's closure he became one of the first DJs on Atlantic 252. He has worked for stations in the GWR Group (now Global Radio). He presented on Talksport Radio (2000–2006). He married arts critic Estelle Lovatt and they have one son. Charlie was seen and heard on Sky News and the BBC's TV News Channel plus Radio 5 Live, as a commentator, providing expert opinion on the Republican Party, but has now retired from public life and suffers from Parkinson's disease.
- Blake Williams went to Guam for a few years but then resided near Moriarty in New Mexico where he ran his own ranch, a small radio station in Albuquerque and worked as a film extra. Blake died in June 2017 following a severe asthma attack causing brain damage.
- David Lee Stone, was heard with a pre-recorded show on Hot Hits on Sundays. He joined Radio Luxembourg for a time then returned to California. David died in 1997.
- Jessie Brandon, who travelled on MV Communicator from Fort Lauderdale to Europe, worked for Radio Nova, Capital Radio and Radio Luxembourg. She returned to the US and worked with Simon Marks's FeatureStoryNews in Washington, DC. In 2020 she is a DJ at WCLZ in Portland
- Steve Masters ran a consulting business in Washington, D.C., and in Paris.
- Rick Harris left in 1985 to work on Radio Nova and then returned to the US where he works in IT.
- Chris Carson (Skelley) went to Rock KFMH/99 in the Davenport/Quad Cities (US), on air and helping with promotions.
- Erin Kelly went to WAVA in Washington DC, moving on from pop to country on WYCD-FM in Detroit under her married name Erin Weber. Currently in 2020 she's a photographer and fundraiser to many charitable causes.
- Manager John Catlett went on to consult for Atlantic 252 and manage Radio Luxembourg and Radio Star India. He then was the COO of Radio Free Europe/Radio Liberty. He is now a broadcasting consultant in New York City.
- Paul Rusling worked on two more radio ship projects and then for several radio stations and organisations across Europe. In 1993 he organised Classic FM's bid for a Dutch national FM licence and then repeated this in Finland And Sweden. He then worked with Sky Radio, Virgin Radio and others on other licence applications and for Radio 10 and others on technical work. He also worked with Nozema, the Dutch state transmission company, which ran all radio transmitters in the Netherlands.
- John Lewis joined the station when it relaunched as Laser Hot Hits and single-handedly ran a station from the ship in October 1987 called Radio Sunk. He then joined several stations in Kent and now lives near Sandwich where he is also a crew member for the RNLI.
- Mike Barrington continued to work on the MV Communicator until it was sold to new owners in early 1989. He is now Head of Security at Sealand, the independent nation established on Roughs Tower, in the Thames estuary off Felixstowe.
- DL Bogart wrote a film script based on his time on the radio ship and hawked this around several Hollywood film companies. Most thought the story was too unbelievable and that American audiences wouldn't believe radio in Europe had ever been so primitive, so it never went beyond a screenplay stage. DL broadcasts a weekly online progressive music show called Very Heavy Uncle.

A full listing of all the voices heard on Laser as DJs and newsreaders, together with their biographies and photographs, was published in the book Laser Radio Programming.

== Themes ==
Station theme

- The nightly closedown song for Laser 558 and Laser Hot Hits was "Thank You For The Music" by ABBA.

Jingles

- The jingles used for Laser 558 were customized acapella composite cuts produced by JAM Creative Productions based out of Dallas, Texas.

DJ themes

- Charlie Wolf's theme song was "Who's Afraid Of The Big Bad Wolf?" by The Three Little Pigs. He often used the Sailors Hornpipe tune from the Los Angeles Air Force library.

== Singles ==
- "I Spy For The DTI", by The Moronic Surveyors, a parody of "I Spy (For The FBI)", was released on 23 September 1985 (Farce records 7-inch single DTI 007, 12-inch single DTIT 007). Main vocals on “I Spy For The DTI” were sung by Paul Young, vocalist with the Manchester rock band Sad Café and also Mike and the Mechanics.
- "Laser Radio", by The Communicators, praising the station, was recorded and written by Laser fans Roger King and Yanni Tsamplakos.
- "Laser Rap" by Jazzy E; recorded for the station's promotional video.
