= Radio Regen =

Radio Regen is a charity based in Manchester, UK, that provides training in community radio.

== Origins ==
Emerging from the kernel idea of radio training for unemployed people, Radio Regen was born as a non-profit organisation in April 1999, in partnership with Manchester College of Arts and Technology (MANCAT).

Training is a central part of their activities and they offer several radio production courses in conjunction with MANCAT. Courses range from a 10-week Foundation in Radio for the unemployed to an NVQ3 in Radio Production lasting one year.

During the first training course run by the new organisation, the desire to bring broadcasting to communities was discovered.

== Peak-time big names, off-peak trainees ==
In 1999, Radio Regen joined with local listings magazine City Life, published by GMG, to launch a two-month-long temporary radio station - City Centre Life 87.7 - from the Oxfam Originals store in the city's Northern Quarter. The station was marketed as an alternative to existing radio stations, promising "Cutting edge music from Manchester's best DJs" on a station flyer.

Behind the public face, retrained unemployed people brought their MANCAT training into reality, producing shows and presenting output on the station.

The following year saw a slightly different line up return as Radio Sonic - "28 days of HIGH STRENGTH ANTIDOTE to BRAIN DEAD corporate radio", with the same mixed output.

Following the successful introduction of the trainees onto the air, a series of 72-hour community broadcasts was held from libraries, community centres and social clubs in Moston, Openshaw, Longsight and Wythenshawe FM.

Over To You FM greeted the launch of the Local Strategic Partnership; a three-day transmission during the inauguration of The Lowry arts centre; and Chipping FM, a temporary station set up in rural Lancashire provided support during the foot-and-mouth outbreak.

== Access Radio pilots ==
Discussions between the government and the Radio Authority in 2002 made it clear that the Government was considering introducing a third tier of broadcasting alongside the BBC and commercial radio. From the 200 applications received by the Radio Authority, 15 were awarded one year licenses with Radio Regen winning two, ALL FM and WFM. All the stations went on air later that year, with the period of the scheme later extended for a further year until 31 December 2004.

For now, WFM and ALL FM continue to be overseen by Radio Regen, but the aim is for ownership to be transferred to residents and managed by local steering groups.

== Role as community radio advisors ==
Radio Regen started 2004 by hosting the Community FM conference at Manchester Airport's Radisson SAS Hotel as the first step towards establishing itself as a national centre for expertise in community radio. The conference brought in the North West Development Agency into the field as sponsors.

Since 1999, it has enabled more than 6,000 residents of disadvantaged areas of Manchester, Salford and the North West to get on air. Their ground-breaking experiment in how community radio tackles disadvantage and aides regeneration has included more than 25 temporary Restricted Service Licence (RSL) broadcasts and a number of full-time stations. These have been backed up by accredited training in radio production for local volunteers as well as art, youth and community development projects.

They have also been pivotal in securing political support for the introduction of community radio across the UK. Their Community FM conferences in Manchester in 2004 and 2005 helped would-be licencees develop their station concepts and apply for licences for forthcoming start-ups.

The years 2005 and 2006 saw community radio stations gaining licences and going live across the UK. To help facilitate this, Radio Regen have launched a Professional Skills Centre, a "national centre of excellence" for community radio.

They have also compiled a handbook and training materials titled "The Community Radio Toolkit" . All community radio practitioners are invited to use the site to share information, learn and debate about any matters affecting the sector.

== Full time community stations ==
As well as the grown-up pilots of ALL FM and Wythenshawe FM, Radio Regen has backed the newly launched Ribble Valley Radio (from the root of Chipping FM) and Salford City Radio.
