= Eastern Horizon =

- Other names: Chinatown
- Genre: Community access
- Running time: Every Saturday 12 mn – 1 am
- Country of origin: England
- Languages: Bilingual; Chinese; English
- Home station: BBC Radio Manchester
- Hosted by: Juanita Yau; Louisa Yong; Daveed Chow
- Created by: David Wong
- Produced by: Eastern Horizon Broadcasting Team
- Original release: 15 December 1983 – 6 October 2018
- Audio format: Stereo
- Website: Eastern Horizon

Eastern Horizon is the United Kingdom's first bilingual (Chinese and English) community radio programme broadcast to a local audience. It was broadcast live in Manchester on BBC Radio Manchester, mostly recently on Saturdays between 12 midnight and 1 am.

== Background ==
Eastern Horizon is a community access programme produced by and for the Chinese Community in Greater Manchester and the North West. Eastern Horizon was founded by a group of Chinese volunteers, led by David Wong. Early presenters and contributors included Leonard Wong, Osmond Lam, Michelle Chan, Roland, Soshan, Yin King Chiu, Simon Jones, Philip Godber, Winnie Godber, Josephine Chan, Alice, Susanna Chiu, Joseph Wu, Sally Li and Mike Dillon. Its aim is to be "a communication channel between the Chinese community and the host community".

== History ==
The programme first broadcast on 15 December 1983 as a recorded 30-minute programme once a month. It was then expanded to one hour a week. The show was one of the first in the UK to link up with Chinese radio stations around the world to produce simulcast programme. The show is now called Chinatown and is transmitted every Sunday evening for two hours.

On 14 December 2008, another simulcast was conducted with Spectrum Radio in London to celebrate the Silver Jubilee of the establishment of Eastern Horizon with original crew members from the 1980s and 1990s.

The programme had its last transmission on 6 October 2018 and a campaign was set up to try to save it.

== Presenters ==
Presenters include Juanita Yau, Dee Lo and Kevin Shang. Current Programme Transmission

== Programme content ==
The programme plays a range of Chinese music from Canto-Pop and Mandarin classics to Chinese Classical tunes. It covers a range of community issues and promote events and activities for the community. Police have used the programme to broadcast appeals for information in Cantonese to the Chinese community.

== Events and activities ==
The programme team regularly works with other community group, organising and partake in many local fund-raising activities. Past events included Children in Need Parties, Karaoke and fashion shows.
