= 365 Media Group =

Former sports media company

365 Media Group is a now dormant sports media company that once employed over 100 people in Leeds, England and Cape Town, South Africa.

Between 2001 and October 2006, the company was known as ukbetting plc and grew through the acquisition of a number of businesses including: ukbetting.com Ltd, PA Sporting Life Ltd, the UK assets of the Sportal and Sports.com, TEAMtalk Media Group plc and Rivals Digital Media Ltd.

In January 2007, 365 Media Group was itself acquired by British Sky Broadcasting and the company now operates as a division of Sky Sports. Later that year, in June 2007, the company's totalbet and ukbetting gaming brands were absorbed into Sky Bet, Sky's own betting brand.

TEAMtalk, PlanetF1, PlanetRugby, Golf365, Cricket365 and Football365 are now part of Planet Sport Ltd's Planet Sport Network.

365 Media Group ran a network of sports news and content websites, including TEAMtalk, PlanetF1.com, Football365, sportinglife.com and Sportal. The company was also involved in content syndication to other media owners and mobile network operators.

== TEAMtalk ==
TEAMtalk.com is the name of a football-related website based in Leeds since 1996 when it was launched by Bill Wilson's IMS PLC. The site grew out of the premium rate football phonelines phenomenon of the early 1990s, developing into a website with a tabloid media style of reporting. The site has sections for all clubs in the FA Premier League, and features Your Say sections which allow the users of the site to comment on the football stories of the day. TEAMtalk briefly ran an AM radio station, TEAMtalk 252, broadcasting from Ireland using the equipment of Atlantic 252, which both opened and closed in 2002.

TEAMtalk Broadcast and its sister company TEAMtalk Satellite were taken over and renamed by Headland Media in May 2008. As of 2021, TEAMtalk.com is published by Planet Sport Ltd in Leeds.
