= Charlie Wolf =

British-American disc jockey and political commentator

- Born: 12 April 1959 (age 66)
- Occupations: Broadcaster, commentator, writer/blogger

Stephen Linsky (born 12 April 1959), better known as Charlie Wolf, is a UK-based American radio talk show host, disc jockey and political commentator, and formerly the Communications Director of Republicans Abroad UK. Wolf previously presented a late-night phone-in show on the radio station Talksport.

== Broadcasting career ==
Originally from Boston and using his real name, Wolf moved to Provo, Utah in 1983 working at KEYY Radio as a weekend on-air host. Wolf moved to the UK in 1984 to DJ for the pirate radio station Laser 558. Laser 558 was broadcasting from MV Communicator, based in international waters. In 1989, he became one of the launch presenters at Atlantic 252 and was soon presenting the breakfast show, doing so until around 1993. He also presented the network evening show on the three GWR FM stations in the west of England. In 2002 Wolf moved to Cork in Ireland to host RedFM's Cork Talks Back show and subsequently presented RedFM's breakfast show until his departure in June 2004. For a short period Wolf broadcast on both Red FM and talkSPORT, and flew from Cork to London and back on Ryanair. On a number of occasions, he presented his talkSPORT show remotely from a studio at RedFM. He was also a stand-in presenter on the Frinton-on-Sea based radio station Big L 1395.

Since leaving TalkSport, Wolf worked mainly as a radio and television pundit and commentator, mainly debating or speaking on American politics and news stories for a variety of broadcasters including the BBC (World Service, BBC News Channel and radio including BBC Radio 4's Today, Any Questions and Jeremy Vine's show on BBC Radio 2).

On 12 October 2007, he appeared on David Frost's Al Jazeera English programme Frost Over the World, debating capital punishment with Bianca Jagger. He was a regular guest especially during US presidential elections until Frost's death.

For much of the 2010s, he appeared every Sunday night (occasionally having been switched to Friday night) on BBC Radio 5 Live's Nolan show, with Stephen Nolan and Stephen Lowe.

During the 2010s, he also appeared a regular guest on the News panel on LBC with former talkSPORT presenter Ian Collins.

Wolf is now listed as one of the DJs on the revived Laser558, although whether these are recordings or live programmes is unclear.

== Writing ==
Whilst in Cork he also wrote a weekly column in the local Evening Echo newspaper for a time. Wolf went on to write a column for a London-based community newspaper.

== Controversies ==
During his talkSPORT show on 4 December 2005, Wolf described Rachel Corrie, an American activist who had been killed by an Israeli military bulldozer, as "scum." Wolf claimed later in the broadcast that he was sorry for Corrie's death, "even if by her own stupidity" but his comments were in relation to her burning a facsimile of an American flag while in Gaza. In its bulletin dated 23 January 2006, Ofcom ruled this comment to be in breach of the "Generally Accepted Standards" section of the Broadcasting Code and stated it was "seriously ill-judged".

== Personal life ==
Wolf married London-based journalist and art critic Estelle Lovatt in August 2004. They have a son, born in 2005.

In June 2007, Wolf announced that he has kidney cancer.
