= Your FM =

- Stockport; England
- Frequency: 107.8 MHz

Programming
- Format: Community radio

History
- First air date: 13 September 2006
- Former names: Pure 107.8

Technical information
- ERP: 25 watts
- Transmitter coordinates: 53.4076°N 2.1616°W

Links
- Website: yourfmlive.com

Your FM is a community radio station broadcasting in Stockport, Greater Manchester. It replaced a previous station operating under the same licence, Pure 107.8.

== History ==
=== Pure 107.8 ===
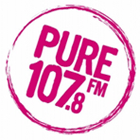
Logo as Pure 107.8

Pure 107.8 launched on 13 September 2006 following a number of restricted service licence broadcasts in the Stockport area under the name Pure Radio. It was part of Pure Innovations, a not-for-profit organisation that employs people from disadvantaged backgrounds to build the skills and confidence to get back into employment.

During its time on air, the station did not subscribe to RAJAR but claimed approximately 27,000 listeners in a self-commissioned Ipsos MORI poll. It covered local news and events in the Stockport area and played music from the last four decades. Pure Radio also provided live commentary of every Stockport County match, both home and away, until August 2017, when rights reverted to Imagine FM. The station was based in Cheadle Heath, Stockport.

In February 2017, it was reported the station faced closure as Pure Innovations no longer had the finances to support the project. At the time of closure, the station had three full-time members of staff and over 50 volunteers.

=== Your FM ===
In September 2017, the community radio licence for Stockport transferred to a new group, and the station was re-launched in November as Your FM.

The Your FM website does not carry any current schedules or lists of presenters/programmes.

== Programming ==
Your FM programming consists of adult contemporary music through the day alongside local news and information. The station's Key Commitments state that it must broadcast "local news, local sports news, advice and information related to specific areas of disadvantage".

== Transmission ==
The station transmits from a site at Ratcliffe Towers in Stockport town centre. Its transmission ERP is 25 watts. Recently it appears that Your FM ceased transmission on FM as of 2026. There has been no official word on what exactly is going on with the station and what will happen to the FM frequency in the future. Meanwhile the station has re-appeared on DAB in the Stockport area.
