= Fortune 1458 =

Fortune 1458 was an Independent Local Radio station based in Trafford Park, Manchester, England.

== History ==
The station began broadcasting in 1994 on the old BBC Radio Manchester medium wave frequency. It was seen as a direct competitor to Piccadilly 1152 as the station focussed on older listeners by broadcasting an easy listening format.

Following takeovers, the frequency was the host to several different stations and formats, including Lite 1458, Big AM and Capital Gold. The frequency was last used by Gold until it went off air in late April 2024.

== Notable presenters ==
- Dave Cash
- Tommy Docherty
- Susie Mathis
- James H Reeve
- Becky Want
