= RTÉ Radio 1 =

Irish radio station

- Dublin; Ireland
- Broadcast area: Ireland and Northern Ireland (FM), Ireland and the United Kingdom (satellite TV), Worldwide on internet
- Frequencies: 87.8–90.0 MHz FM; Saorview: 200; Saorsat: 21; Virgin Media Ireland: 901; Sky: 0137; Virgin Media (UK): 917; Freesat: 750
- RDS: RTE R1

Programming
- Format: Full-service radio

Ownership
- Owner: Raidió Teilifís Éireann
- Sister stations: RTÉ Gold; RTÉ 2fm RTÉ lyric fm RTÉ Raidió na Gaeltachta

History
- First air date: 1 January 1926; 100 years ago
- Former frequencies: 252 kHz LW; 567 kHz & 729 kHz MW; 227.360 MHz (12B) DAB

Links
- Webcast: MP3
- Website: rte.ie/radio1/

RTÉ Radio 1 is an Irish national radio station owned and operated by RTÉ and is the direct descendant of Dublin radio station 2RN, which began broadcasting on a regular basis on 1 January 1926.

The total budget for the station in 2010 was €18.4 million. It is the most-listened-to radio station in Ireland.

== History ==
The Department of Posts and Telegraphs opened 2RN, the first Irish radio station, on 1 January 1926. Station 6CK, a Cork relay of 2RN, joined the Dublin station in 1927, and a high-power transmitter at Athlone in County Westmeath opened in 1932. From the latter date the three stations became known as Radio Athlone, later being renamed Radio Éireann ("Irish Radio"/"Radio of Ireland") in 1937.

Like most small European broadcasters at that time Radio Éireann had only been assigned a single high-power frequency (meaning only one channel could be broadcast), and had limited programming hours due to financial constraints. Until after the Second World War Radio Éireann was only able to afford to broadcast in the evenings with the exception of a programme of records in the afternoon. It broadcast a mixed schedule of light entertainment and serious drama, Irish language programming, and talks. Radio Éireann also carried sponsored programmes, often produced by Leonard Plugge's International Broadcasting Company, which tended to be more popular than programming made directly by Radio Éireann itself.

Operated as part of the civil service until 1960, the Broadcasting Authority Act 1960 transferred the station to a statutory corporation, also called Radio Éireann, in preparation for the launch of its sister television station. The name of the corporation was changed to Radio Telefís Éireann in 1966. As a consequence, the station was renamed RTÉ Radio. The station also began FM transmission in 1966. In 1971 the station began the phased move from the GPO on O'Connell Street in Dublin city centre, to a new purpose-built Radio Centre at Donnybrook, with the last broadcast from the GPO on 8 November 1976. When, in 1979, RTÉ established a new rock and pop station under the name of RTÉ Radio 2 (now RTÉ 2fm), the original RTÉ Radio station was renamed RTÉ Radio 1.

In 1973, The Gay Byrne Hour began, becoming The Gay Byrne Show in 1979. This anchored the station's daily morning schedule until 1998. On 3 November 1984, current affairs programmes Morning Ireland and Today at Five began broadcasting. The former is now the flagship programme of RTÉ News and Current Affairs on radio while the latter has evolved into the current Drivetime programme via Five Seven Live.

== Reception ==
RTÉ Radio 1 is available in Ireland on 88-90 MHz FM.

DAB broadcasts of the station began in the east of the country (from the Clermont Carn and Three Rock Mountain high power transmitters via the RTÉ DAB Multiplex) on 1 January 2006. RTÉ DAB is available on the Saorview platform. Listeners to WRN's English Service for Europe and English Service for North America can also hear a selection of RTÉ Radio 1 programmes. RTÉ Radio 1 has been carried on shortwave in DRM during specific events, including the All Ireland finals. RTÉ carried out DRM tests on its former longwave frequency 252 kHz.

The station's tuning signal since 1936 has been the air O'Donnell Abú, although since the advent of 24-hour broadcasting in 1997, the tune has been played only as a prelude to the start of the day's live broadcasting at 5:30 on weekday mornings.

The station broadcasts weekdays from 05:30 - 03:00 and weekends from 06:00 - 02:00. During the station's overnight downtime, Radio 1 simulcasts the output of the digital "classic hits" channel RTÉ Gold.

=== Satellite ===
The FM service is also available online and from the Astra 2E satellite at 28.2° East on transponder 7 (11.914 GHz horizontal, symbol rate 27500, FEC 5/6, service ID 5544), Freesat channel 750, Sky channel 0160 and Virgin Media channel 917.

=== Former Medium Wave broadcast ===
RTÉ Radio 1 was available until 2008 on medium wave. The medium-wave transmitters of RTÉ Radio 1 were shut down at 15.00 on 24 March 2008. The main transmitter was based at Tullamore and broadcast on 567 kHz. A lower–powered relay in Cork at 729 kHz was also in service. Before 1975, the main transmitter was based at Athlone using the same frequency. AM transmissions continued on longwave 252 kHz from Summerhill, County Meath until 14 April 2023, aimed to serve Irish people living in Britain and used the old Atlantic 252 transmitter. In 2007 a new telefunken tram 300 kW transmitter was installed which was capable of DRM (Digital Radio Mondiale) broadcasts which could transmit up to seven services in near FM quality, but consumer receivers were not being manufactured. The power could be remotely regulated on this transistor-based transmitter. The two original 1989 transmitters were made by Continental Electronics each 300 kW and were tube based. Because there was only one 300 kW transmitter then the maximum possible power was 300 kW even though the site was licensed for 500 kW 24hrs. Since the closure, Second Helpings programmes at the weekend have been limited to digital broadcasts only. Most complaints about the closure of mediumwave were from groups such as fishermen and the elderly, also from people who did not have the longwave band on their radios.

Part of the rationale behind closing medium wave and using long wave to access listeners in hard-to-reach parts of Ireland and the UK, was that reception would be better in places such as the south of England and London areas which in the past had very poor coverage from RTÉ on mediumwave.

The unused 296m medium wave transmission mast at Ballycommon, near Tullamore was demolished on 25 July 2023.

=== Former Long Wave broadcast ===
RTÉ Radio 1 was available from 2004 to 2023 on 252 kHz longwave (LW), the frequency formerly used by the Atlantic 252 radio station. The LW version of Radio 1, which used to also be able to be received across the United Kingdom and parts of Western Europe, was also the only RTÉ Radio service available in parts of Northern Ireland since the closure of mediumwave. It differed in certain respects from that broadcast on FM, particularly at the weekend, with significant additional sports coverage and religious programming.

RTÉ operated 252 longwave at a markedly lower power level than its ITU licensed 500 kilowatts: in the daytime it radiated at 150 kW and at night 60 kW. This reduction in power meant that interference from the French-language station Alger Chaîne 3 – broadcasting on the same frequency from Tipaza with a daytime power of 1,500 kW and 750 kW at night – was considerable, and particularly affected reception of RTÉ Radio 1 on longwave on the south coast of Ireland after dark.

The LW service was due to be withdrawn on Monday 27 October 2014 on cost grounds. However, RTÉ subsequently announced that it had postponed the closure until 19 January 2015 "in order to ensure that listeners, particularly in the UK, have sufficient time to understand and avail themselves of alternatives". As a result of further public pressure, especially from elderly Irish listeners in Britain, churches, the GAA, emigrant groups, and listeners in Northern Ireland who wouldn't all have access to RTÉ on FM or DAB, it was announced in December 2014 that the 252 frequency would be kept on the air until at least 2017, and in March 2017 that transmission on longwave would continue until June 2019. The longwave transmission was off the air for maintenance for six weeks in September/October 2019.

In March 2023 RTE announced that the longwave service would cease on 14 April of that year. The final long wave broadcast occurred during the Late Date music programme of Friday night into Saturday morning, 14/15 April 2023, presented by Ciara King. After the 11:55pm weather forecast, the last ever record played on RTE's AM services was Misirlou by Dick Dale and his Del-Tones. This was followed by the midnight news, after which the closedown of the long wave service occurred at 12:03am on 15 April 2023. After a short silence there was a looped broadcast of the station tuning signal and an information message on other methods of listening to the station. Transmission of the advisory message ceased on 18 April 2023 at 11:00am.

The unused 248m long wave transmission mast at Clarkstown near Summerhill, County Meath was demolished on 27 July 2023.
