= ALL FM =

- Manchester; England
- Broadcast area: South, central and east Manchester
- Frequency: 96.9 MHz
- RDS: _ALL_fm_

Programming
- Format: Community

Ownership
- Owner: Independent

History
- First air date: May 2000

Technical information
- Power: 50 watts
- Transmitter coordinates: 53.4542°N 2.1888°W

Links
- Website: www.allfm.org

ALL FM (96.9 MHz) is a community radio station serving south, central and east Manchester and based in the South Manchester suburb of Levenshulme. The station is run by paid staff and volunteers living in its coverage area.

== History ==
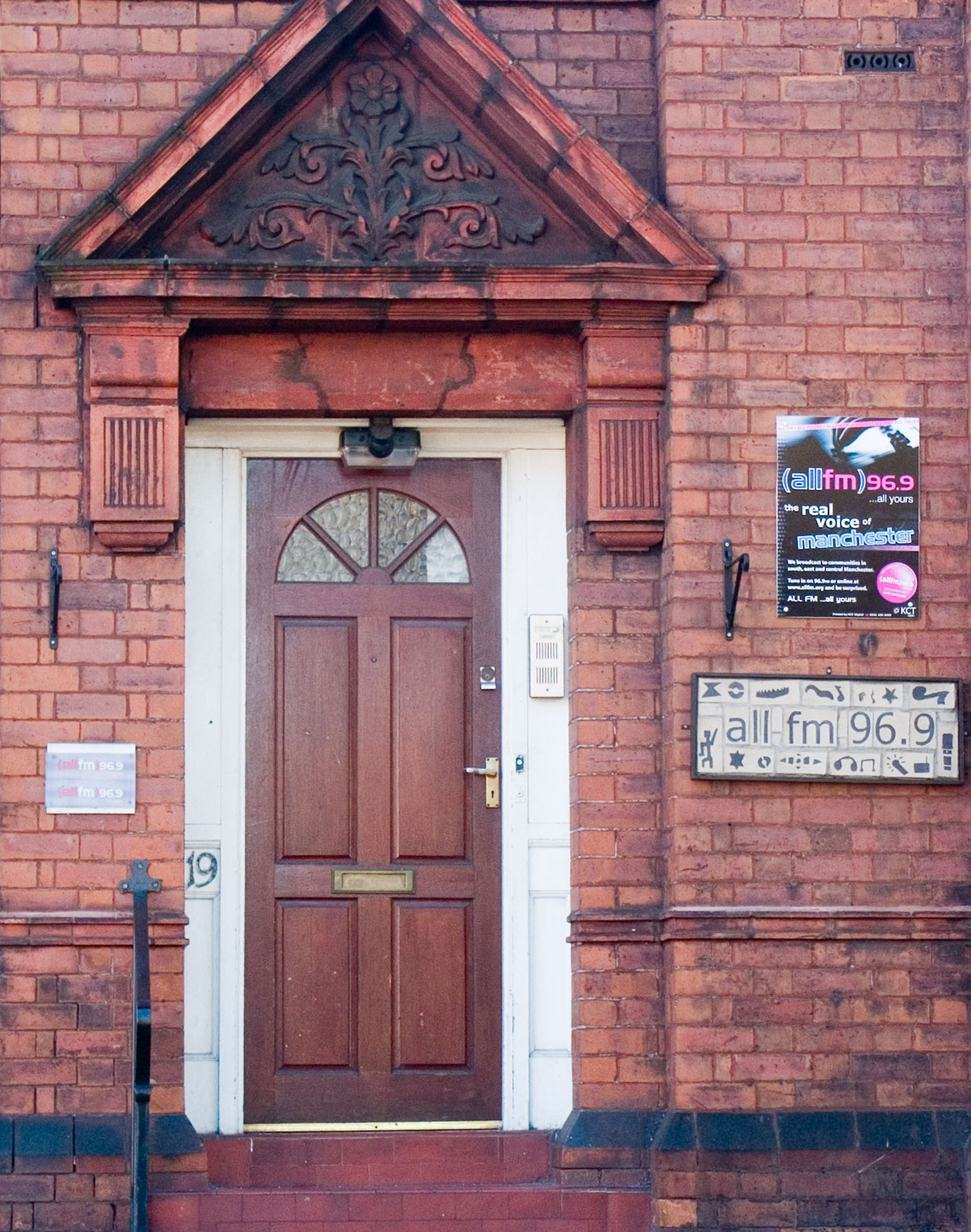
ALL FM's former building on Albert Road, Levenshulme

ALL FM began in 2000 as a project of the charity Radio Regen, with a four-day broadcast under the title Radio Longsight. After the success of Radio Longsight, ALL FM was created, with station manager Dave Lenaghan, covering the Longsight area and the neighbouring areas of Ardwick and Levenshulme (hence the acronym ALL). As ALL FM, two restricted service licences (RSLs) were obtained, allowing ALL FM to transmit on a temporary basis.

In 2002, the station became part of the government's Access Radio pilot scheme. ALL FM became an independent company and was granted a permanent community radio licence in 2005.

In 2015, poet and broadcaster Lemn Sissay became patron of ALL FM. He said he loved the diversity of the station and it was (as far as he knew) the only station to have played his track 'Architecture'.

In 2019, international musician Aziz Ibrahim, a guitarist who works with The Stone Roses and many other artists, took over as patron.

== Programming and activities ==
The station broadcasts to an area described by the founders as "one of the most multicultural outside London". Its wide variety of programming includes French, Cantonese, Persian, Polish, Portuguese, Spanish, Panjabi and Hindi.

ALL FM regularly gains grant funding to train groups rarely heard on radio and podcasts, including diverse older people who record shows in residential homes, community centres as well as broadcasting live from the Stevie Fly studio at ALL FM.

A series of funded 'women-only' training programmes led to the launch in 2021 of Women on the Mic, a project to make ALL FM one of the few radio stations with 50% women producers and presenters. In the same year, it launched Young Minds, a training programme and regular radio show produced by girls and young women aged 11 to 17.

ALL FM launched on DAB+ on October 20th, 2023. The same day as they renamed Studio Two, the Claire Mooney Studio, after the ALL FM presenter, musician & activist. Five years previously the Stevie Fly studio was opened. Stevie Fly was instrumental in helping set up ALL FM.

ALL FM's sister station WFM 97.2 broadcasts to the Wythenshawe area of Manchester, a few miles south of the ALL FM target area.

== Awards ==
ALL FM won the Bronze in the Community Radio Award's Station of the Year award in 2018. 'The Innocent Ear' show won silver in the Specialist Music show category.

In 2020 it gained the Queen's Award for Voluntary Service and two years later its 'Echo' show, a Cantonese programme serving Manchester's Hong Kong community, gained a Gold Award at the 2022 Community Radio Awards. ALL FM won the Community Radio Station of the Year award in 2019 and again in 2024. The only radio station to win it two times. In 2024 it was also successful in the Mcr Culture Awards.

'The core of the station, its commitment to giving everyone a voice, comes through loud and clear.'- Community Radio Awards, 2024.
