= TEAMtalk 252 =

Former British radio station

TEAMtalk252
- Ireland
- Broadcast area: Ireland and the United Kingdom
- Frequency: 252 kHz AM

Programming
- Format: Sports commentary Sports discussion Talk and news

Ownership
- Owner: TEAMtalk Media Group

History
- First air date: 11 March 2002
- Last air date: 31 July 2002

TEAMtalk 252 was a short-lived UK national commercial sports radio station, based in Leeds in West Yorkshire with long wave transmission coming from the Clarkstown radio transmitter in Trim, County Meath in Ireland, formerly used by Atlantic 252.

Its 24-hour sports content included a popular news-based breakfast show, sports phone-ins, discussions and specialist programming.

The station was broadcast on the 252 kHz Longwave across Ireland and the United Kingdom, and was also available to listeners on Sky and online.

== Launch ==
The station was launched on 11 March 2002 at 2pm as the UK's first national commercial radio station dedicated 100% to sport, providing entertaining and informative coverage of all UK football, rugby, racing, cricket and all major sporting events. TEAMtalk 252 also provided a number of specialist programmes dedicated to racing, cricket, motor racing, non-league football, business, rugby league, US sports and live coverage of the British Basketball League.

TEAMtalk 252 launched with the help of former England International Teddy Sheringham and Footballers' Wives star Zöe Lucker, who played Tanya Turner, and although it had 19 studios and employed 100 full-time sports journalists, the newcomer made no attempt to muscle into the patch already covered by BBC Radio 5 Live and Talksport. Both stations had already spent millions on buying broadcast rights for live sports commentaries, but TEAMtalk 252 said it would concentrate on news, analysis and opinion in addition to their Saturday night British Basketball League coverage.

The station's biggest names included former England International Phil Neal, Jamie Broadbent who was part of Chris Evans' Virgin Radio Breakfast Show and broadcasting personality James H. Reeve. John Meek, George Riley, Jonathan Doidge, Adam Pope, Neil Henderson, John Newcombe, Simon Barlow, Tim Thornton and Al Bentley were all part of TEAMtalk 252's launch schedule.

Speaking about its launch, TEAMtalk Media Group sports director Ian Holding said: "Sports fans will come to know TEAMtalk 252 as the only station where they can tune in and guarantee to find sport. We have a great team in place and an enviable number of sports journalists who will enable us to deliver the broadest sports coverage possible."

== Programming ==
TEAMtalk 252's programming consisted of sports talk, sports phone-ins, discussions and specialist programming 24 hours a day.

The day began with the morning's sports news, debate and reaction on The Full Sports Breakfast with Jon Meek and George Riley, before the baton was passed to Jamie Broadbent and Adam Pope on It's Your Shout, who took an in-depth look at the day's sports stories and invited listeners to have their say, before James H. Reeve hosted an afternoon sports talk show with live horse racing and interviews. Neil Henderson and Jon Newcombe rounded-up the day's sports news on Drive including all the latest stories from around the United Kingdom with their team of reporters.

Sportsnight, hosted by Simon Barlow and Tim Thornton then guided listeners through the evening's sporting action, before handing over to the late night team on The Final Whistle with Al Bentley and Terry 'fatty' McGeadie, the station's nightly sports phone-in. Up For It with Gavin Hamilton, Nolan Kane and Mike Cunliffe was broadcast throughout the night.

On Saturday and Sunday, TEAMtalk 252 had full coverage of the weekend's sport with the latest news and scores from the ground on 252 Matchday, and also specialist programming including The Stable Breakfast, a show dedicated to horse racing, League Talk, presented by Jonathan Doidge and the only national radio sports show dedicated to rugby league, The Non League Show with Brendan Fatchett and The Business of Sport.

TEAMtalk 252 also broadcast coverage of the 2002 FIFA World Cup in Japan and South Korea providing unofficial off-tube commentary of matches involving England national football team and the Republic of Ireland national football team, in addition to the knockout stages. This was despite the fact that BBC Radio 5 Live held broadcast rights to the tournament, and Talksport also provided their own unofficial off-tube coverage.

== Presenters ==
TEAMtalk 252 had a roster of regular presenters, which included: Adam Pope, Al Bentley, Brendan Fatchett, Jonathan Doidge, Nick Millard, Gavin Hamilton, George Riley, James H. Reeve, Jamie Broadbent, Jason Thornton, Jon Meek, Jon Newcombe, Mike Cunliffe, Neil Henderson, Nick Harris, Nolan Kane, Phil Neal, Simon Barlow, Seth Bennett, Terry McGeadie, John Hunt and Tim Thornton.

== Audience ==
TEAMtalk 252's first and only set of RAJAR audience figures showed the station had 428,000 listeners a week in the first quarter of 2002. Its Irish audience figures were never measured. For the same period, rivals Talksport increased its overall weekly audience to 2.47 million, while BBC Radio 5 Live had 6.4 million listeners. Audience figures for TEAMtalk 252 were not helped by its poor signal in London and the south east of England.

== Demise ==
TEAMtalk had a reported £28 million in the bank and allocated £8m to TEAMtalk 252 stating it needed to break even by 2004, but that it didn't have enough money to bid for major exclusive sporting rights.

Instead the station set about quickly growing its audience around sports news, discussion shows and creative programming, but the divided TEAMtalk board was under pressure in the post tech-stock era and the costs of operating the channel became more difficult to reconcile, despite its increasing popularity and use of originated content across other channels.

As a result of disagreements over the company's direction, TEAMtalk's group chairman Bill Wilson stepped down in April and by mid-May 2002. TEAMtalk 252's owners confirmed that it was in discussions with a number of parties who had expressed an interest in buying either part of or all off the TEAMtalk group. It had, a week previously, been approached by online betting business ukbetting plc with an offer of £10.2m for lock, stock and barrel — this was rejected by the TEAMtalk management. In April 2002, £9.5m was written off by TEAMtalk which admitted it had over-stretched itself financially. By the end of May 2002, TEAMtalk 252's future was thrown firmly into doubt when a deal was done between the parent company TEAMtalk and previous group bidder ukbetting to take over TEAMtalk for £13.7m.

ukbetting appeared to be mainly interested in TEAMtalk's other sporting services including internet site TEAMtalk.com; at that time ukbetting's portfolio of websites included sports sites sportinglife.com, sportal.com and bettingzone.co.uk, as well as betting sites totalbet.com and ukbetting.com. Subsequent takeovers have added Oddschecker.co.uk, Rivals.net, Football365, Golf365, Cricket365, Planet-Rugby and Planet-F1 among others to the stable.

TEAMtalk 252 closed suddenly on 31 July 2002. Staff were informed at a meeting held that morning that the station would close between 12:00 and 14:00 that day. The station ended broadcasting at 13:42 as presenter James H Reeve said, "My dad always said don't start something you can't finish, and he'd be proud of me now." It is reported that it was cut mid-sentence.

== Legacy: Streaming audio & FM ==
teamtalk.com subsequently established a business of providing streaming audio commentary services to sporting businesses, notably betting shops such as Ladbrokes, Coral and Paddy Power.

TEAMtalk also provide broadcast services for live restricted service licence FM stations at sporting venues, including for the Cheltenham Gold Cup. As with most other RSL stations, these operate for a strictly limited number of days on strictly limited power, typically allowing reception only within a couple of miles (kilometres) of the venue. The RSL stations are also broadcast over the internet.
