= Tipaza Longwave Transmitter =

Coordinates: 36°33′58″N 2°28′50″E

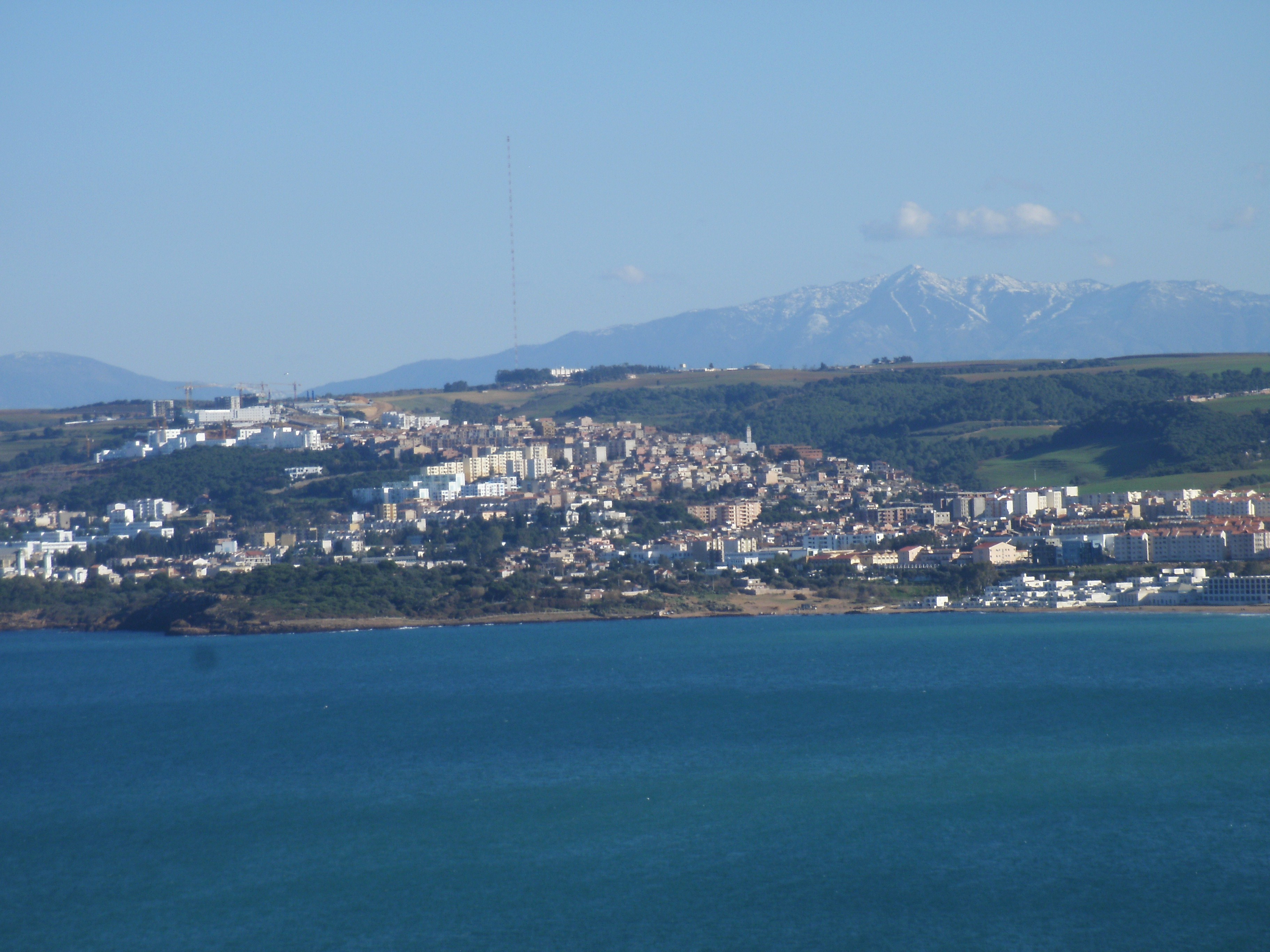
View of Tipaza with the longwave transmitter in the background.

Tipaza Longwave Transmitter is a broadcast transmitter of Algeria's Entreprise nationale de Radiodiffusion sonore. It broadcasts the French-speaking station Alger Chaîne 3 on the longwave frequency of 252 kHz. Tipaza Longwave Transmitter, which is situated near Tipaza at 36°33'58" N and 2°28'50" E, has a transmission power of 1500 kW during the day and 750 kW at night. Tipaza Longwave Transmitter antenna is a 355-meter tall guyed mast,which is the second-tallest structure of Algeria.
