= Manchester Sports =

English sports radio programme

Manchester Sports is a radio programme broadcast on BBC Radio Manchester whenever a major sport event involving a local team takes place. It is branded as the largest sports programme in the North West. The most common of these programmes is broadcast on a Saturday afternoon during the football season, usually starting at 2 o'clock and finishing at 6 o'clock with a live commentary game of one of the 3 o'clock games.

== Presenters ==
Jack Dearden is the main commentator for the Bolton Wanderers game but if Bolton are not the main commentary game, he will give updates from the game. Dearden is also a presenter of Manchester Sports and usually presents the show when there is a midweek or Sunday game and also covers rugby league. He also previously commentated for Oldham Athletic. Prior to joining Radio Manchester, Dearden was Wigan RLFC's club video commentator.

=== Notable former presenters ===
==== Jimmy Wagg ====
Jimmy Wagg was the main Saturday presenter for Manchester Sports and is known for being a Manchester City fan. Jimmy began presenting the programme in 1988 and his last programme was on Saturday 1 August 2020. He commonly attends the commentary game but is also regularly in the Radio studio. He also presents the Sunday Morning Show. He has presented the show in its various guises since 1988. In September 2015 he reached a milestone of 1,000 shows as presenter of Manchester Sports. Jimmy presented the programme for over 30 years and never missed a Saturday until he stepped down at the end of the 2019-20 season after 32 years of presenting the Saturday programme.

==== Ian Cheeseman ====
Ian Cheeseman was the main commentator for the Manchester City as well as other local lower league games.

== Local teams covered ==
Cricket

- Lancashire

Football

- Manchester City
- Manchester United
- Bolton Wanderers
- Wigan Athletic
- Rochdale
- Oldham Athletic
- Bury
- Macclesfield Town
- Stockport County
- Altrincham
- Salford City

Rugby League

- Wigan Warriors
- Warrington Wolves
- Salford Red Devils
- Leigh Leopards
- Swinton Lions
- Rochdale Hornets
- Oldham Roughyeds

Rugby Union

- Sale Sharks
