= Becky Want =

English broadcaster (born 1964)

Becky Want (born 1964/5) is an English radio and television broadcaster from Manchester who presents The Late Show on BBC Local Radio.

== Broadcasting ==
Want was a host of Radio Wishing Well at Trafford General Hospital. She worked at Signal Radio in Stoke-on-Trent, initially as a secretary before presenting, and Piccadilly Radio and Key 103 in Manchester, hosting Picadilly's early breakfast show, before becoming a presenter on Granada Breeze on weekday afternoons, staying until it closed in 2002.

Want presented Granada Reports and the arts programme 'What's New' with Tony Wilson.

Six months after the closure of Granada Breeze, Want landed a presenting job at BBC Radio Manchester, presenting in the afternoon. Her time slot was extended in 2008. Over the COVID-19 pandemic she hosted the flagship breakfast show for 18 months until September 2021, when she returned to the afternoon. At BBC Radio Manchester, she wore a fat suit in February 2010 as a study of perceptions of obesity.

On BBC television she has presented Inside Out for BBC North West.

Since October 2023 Want has presented the new all-England BBC Local Radio late evening show, The Late Show, Monday to Thursday, Jo Good presenting at the weekend.

She has made films for Morning Live.

== Charity work ==
She is an ambassador for the Prince's Trust She ran the London Marathon in 2010 for Manchester's Christie Hospital and in 2011 she ran the Great Manchester Run for the same charity.

She took part in Comic Relief 2011 and was challenged to perform as a stand-up comedian at the 'Frog and Bucket' comedy club in Manchester. She is listed as a key supporter of the Moore Foundation.

== Personal life ==
Want was born in Hyde or Stockport. Want's parents managed Suttons TV store in Marple, where she performed at The Carver Theatre as a child. She has a sister. She studied drama at Bristol University, with a supplementary subject of radio and television production, and starred in a Beryl Bainbridge production on BBC One. She originally met her partner at university and became engaged to him in 2017, marrying in Manchester that June. They live in Trafford.

She has a son from her previous marriage.

A man was given a suspended sentence for harassing Want in 2017.
