= 96.5 Bolton FM =

UK community radio station

Coordinates: 53°34′43″N 2°25′48″W

Bolton; England
- Frequency: 96.5 MHz

Programming
- Format: Community, adult contemporary

Ownership
- Owner: Bolton Community Radio

History
- First air date: 20 June 2009

Links
- Website: Bolton FM

96.5 Bolton FM is a community radio station based in Bolton, United Kingdom. Their studios are located above Bolton's Ashburner Street Market. The station launched at 11am on 20 June 2009 at the One Bolton Festival event.

They were awarded the title of 'Best Loved Local Radio Station in the UK' during the 2011 nationwide "Thebestof" campaign called '14 Days of Love' as well as winning numerous other awards.

Featuring regular shows such as This is Bolton, Weekend Breakfast with Andy Haslam, Hits and Headlines with Big H and Club Tropicana with Kevin Gurney, the station appeals to a wide audience. They can also be regularly seen out in the Bolton Community hosting roadshows and broadcasting live from several locations. The station also provided technical staff for two Bolton Hospice events: Strictly Learn to Dance, and the My Memories walk.

The station has several high-profile connections including former Labour Whip Frank White as the station's former chairman, and radio professional Darryl Morris as a former director. Former Big Brother UK housemate Luke Marsden is also well known for having presented his own show on the station.

The station broadcasts a live sports programme on Saturday afternoons, including live match commentaries on Bolton Wanderers league and cup matches during the football season.

== Transmission ==
In January 2020, a new aerial of the station expanded coverage to numerous other places in the borough of Bolton that previously were unable to receive the station.

At 2pm on Friday 27th October 2023 Bolton FM started broadcasting on DAB Digital Radio across Bolton and Bury.

The current Ofcom license for Bolton FM runs until June 2029.
