= Atlantic 252 =

Irish former radio station

Coordinates: 53.463°N 6.677°W

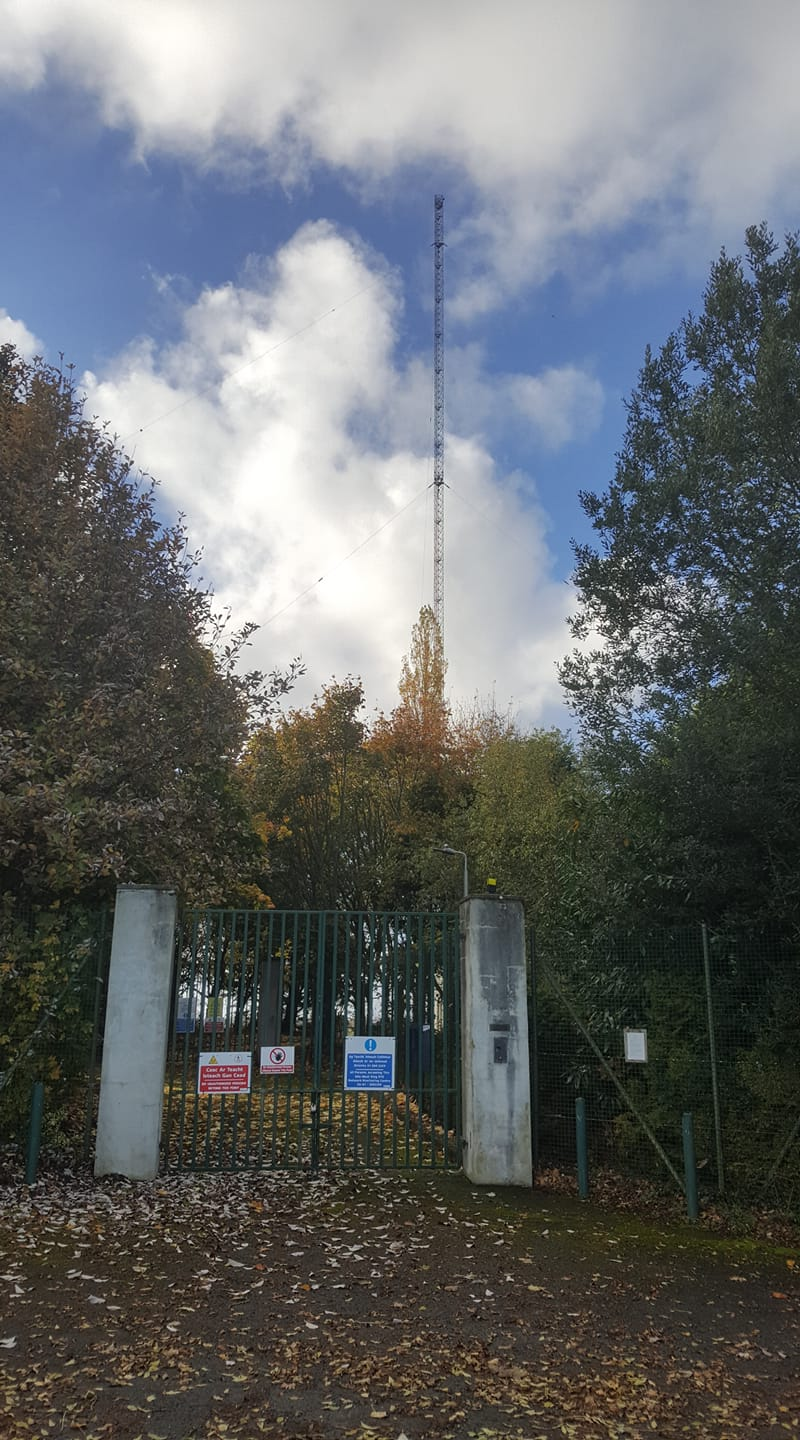
- Station mast
- Ireland
- Broadcast area: Ireland; United Kingdom & mainland Europe (via overspill)
- Frequency: 252 kHz with 500 kW (100 kW nighttime) power

Programming
- Format: Contemporary

Ownership
- Owner: Radio Tara Ltd (RTÉ/RTL Group)

History
- First air date: 1 September 1989
- Last air date: 2 January 2002

Atlantic 252 was an Irish longwave radio station broadcasting to Ireland and the United Kingdom on 252 kHz (1190 metres) from its 1988 purpose-built transmission site at Clarkstown radio transmitter, County Meath, which provided service to Atlantic 252 from 1989 until 2002. The station's studios were located 12 km (7 mi) away in Mornington House, Summerhill Road, Trim, County Meath. Atlantic 252 also had sales offices and studios at 74 Newman Street in London.

== Early history ==
The concept of Atlantic 252 can be traced to as far back as August 1986, when Irish state broadcaster RTÉ announced it was to use its allocated longwave frequency for a new pop music station. Ireland (and RTE) had been allocated a long wave frequency in the Geneva Frequency Plan of 1975. RTÉ teamed up with RTL Group / Radio Luxembourg to form Radio Tara – the trading name of Atlantic 252 – which, being on long wave, was able to provide reception across Ireland and most of the United Kingdom. The Irish Government allowed RTE to allocate the 252 licence to Radio Tara. The broadcaster Pat Kenny, who was a member of the RTE Board, was Chairman of Radio Tara (Atlantic 252) between 1990 - 1992. This followed Chris Cary's pirate Radio XIDY test transmissions on 254 kHz longwave in the mid-1980s.

The Radio Tara company was officially registered in 1985, with trading names of Radio Tara, Atlantic 252 and Tara 254. The company was dissolved in 2011.

In 1987, RTÉ commenced building a giant three-sided 248-metre (814 ft) broadcast mast in Clarkstown, County Meath, using a specially built pair of air- and water-cooled 300 kW solid-state transmitters (which could be combined to give double power) built by Varian Associates, Texas, despite protests from local residents. Studios were set up in Mornington House, in the nearby town of Trim. The station cost £6 million to set up. Just over 47 million people were in the station's broadcast area.

At 8.00 local time (7.00 GMT) on the morning of 1 September 1989 Gary King announced on Atlantic 252, "Mine is the first voice you will ever hear on Atlantic 252". This was followed by a specially produced pre-recorded introduction tape that introduced everybody employed by the radio station on its launch day, from engineers, administration, management like Travis Baxter and John Catlett, and the station's personality music presenter line-up, including ex-Laser 558 presenter Charlie Wolf, Henry Owens, Mary Ellen O'Brien, Dusty Rhodes, Al Dunne, Tony West, Jeff Graham and the station's newsreader Andrew Turner. An appearance was even made by Rosalyn Reilly, who was to remain the station's cleaning lady for its entire twelve-year history.

The station's official "first record ever played" – on the launch date of 1 September 1989 – was "Sowing the Seeds of Love" by Tears for Fears, followed by "Monkey" by George Michael. The first record played during the period of Atlantic 252's test transmissions had been "Ain't Nobody" by Rufus and Chaka Khan ('89 Remix).

Although the transmitter was in Ireland, the signal's reach meant that it was often looked upon as a "UK national station". Reception reports were received from such locations as Berlin, Finland, Ibiza and Moscow. The signal had even been received in Brazil at night-time. The Scottish musician Mylo has claimed that it was the only station with listenable reception on the Isle of Skye. At launch there were no UK-wide commercial stations (the first would be Classic FM in 1992), and the lack of a UK broadcast licence attracted the attention of the IBA. Although the transmitters were theoretically capable of being combined to operate at a radiated power of 600 kW, international agreements limited it to a daytime maximum 500 kW, and just 100 kW during the hours of darkness.

== Mid-1990s peak ==
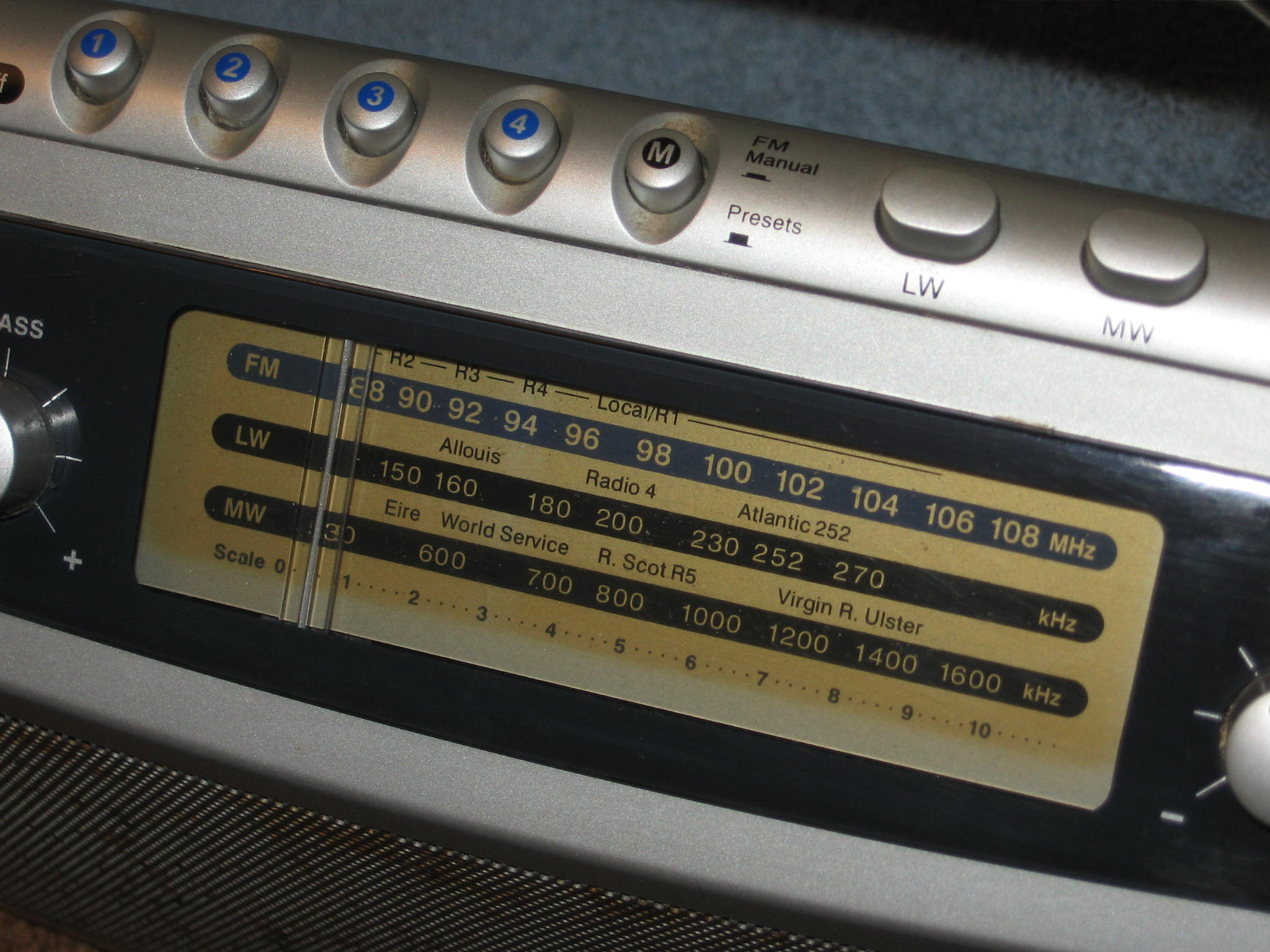
Roberts 928 radio, circa early 2000s, with markings for "Atlantic 252". (This was uncommon as, by the time Atlantic 252 launched in 1989, fewer new radios still included station name markings.)

Initially, the station transmitted only from 6 a.m. until 7 p.m., outside of which listeners were invited to tune to Radio Luxembourg. In August 1990, the station extended its broadcasting hours to 2 a.m. with post-midnight output being automated under the branding of The Big Mattress. In September 1991, Atlantic 252 began broadcasting a 24-hour service, although until the middle of the decade, overnight programming continued to be automated.

The music format consisted of high-rotation mainstream pop and rock music, with influences borrowed heavily from American radio, and through to 1993, a lot of the station's music was drawn from the top part of the US charts. The station mixed the best songs from the last few years along with the best songs from the top 40 – this was called "Today's Best Music Variety". News summaries were broadcast at 10 to and 20 past the hour during the breakfast show and during part of the drivetime show. Commercial Radio and the BBC initially objected to the station, seeing it as a commercial pirate.

At the peak of its popularity in 1993, Atlantic 252 had six million listeners aged 15+ in the UK and Ireland, but vastly increased competition from local radio stations with similar formats saw this decline yearly.

As UK commercial radio developed and deregulation saw many more stations launching, formats similar to Atlantic's began to appear on FM and Atlantic 252's audience began to decline. Attempts at repositioning followed, including "Real Music, Real Radio", when the station attempted to tackle BBC Radio 1's "new music" format.

== Relaunch attempts ==
In late 1998, under the direction of David Dunne, the station responded to dropping audiences by shifting its format to concentrate on indie and dance music, but it continued to lose listeners. This included 30 hours of "specialist" music, including programmes from The Wise Guys, Eddy Temple Morris and the Trade nightclub. Money was spent on advertising and a high-profile breakfast show was attempted fronted by Marc Brow (including several innovative ideas like travel news backed by new age chill out music called 'Traffic Calming', and specially re-formatted youth news presented by Specialist Producer Mark Ovenden which included one of the first broadcast uses of the term 'The Noughties'), in 1999 the station suffered its lowest Rajar ratings since it first came on the air, with the audience falling to just under one million UK listeners in the last quarter of the year.

In November 1999, with the arrival of John O'Hara as the new managing director, the station re-launched in February 2000 as "The New Atlantic 252". The format was changed to urban contemporary music (such as garage, house, hip hop and R&B) and the station was rebranded with the slogan "Non-stop Rhythm and Dance". There was over £1million spent on rebranding and marketing the station to a new audience and media buyers, including a new website. Under the new format RAJAR ratings rose once more above the one million mark, the station had a better market value, and the sale of the station was announced in early 2001 by its owners RTÉ and CLT.

== Last broadcast ==
The last show on Atlantic was presented by Enda Caldwell on 20 December 2001. This was followed by a tribute show produced by Enda Caldwell and Murphy celebrating the station's twelve-year history of broadcasting and featuring classic airchecks of each year of Atlantic 252's history. The station then transitioned to automation, and continued broadcasting music without continuity, along with pre-booked commercials, until midnight on 2 January 2002, when transmissions ceased.

== Notable DJs ==
Many of the original presenters line-up came from Laser 558/UK Commercial Radio and BBC Radio 1, and the Irish presenters came from Dublin superpirates such as Sunshine 101 and SuperQ 102. During the early years the presenters used nicknames, an idea originated in the US at stations like WHTZ FM Z100. Notable presenters included:

- Bam Bam
- Robin Banks
- David Dunne
- Rick O'Shea
- Eddy Temple-Morris
- Charlie Wolf
- Tony Wrighton

== Post-closure ==
=== Teamtalk 252 ===
Atlantic 252 was briefly replaced by a sports station TEAMtalk 252, which opened in the early days of January 2002. This faced competition from BBC Radio 5 Live and Talksport, and was itself closed in the summer of 2002, just a few months after its launch.

=== RTE's use of the frequency ===
From 2004, the frequency was used by RTÉ to provide a version of RTÉ Radio 1 to the expatriate community in Britain.

In 2008, Radio 1 stopped broadcasting on MW and the opt-outs, mostly for weekend sports coverage and for religious programming, were transferred to 252 long wave. It also meant that listeners in Northern Ireland, who had previously relied on the MW transmission, were still able to hear Radio 1.

The LW service was due to be withdrawn in 2014 but this was postponed several times and long wave transmissions continued until Friday night into Saturday morning of 14/15 April 2023. The daily cost of transmission was the primary reason for ending the service.

The transmitter mast was demolished on 27 July 2023, three months after it had fallen silent for the final time.

Mornington House is now used as regional offices for Meath County Council.

=== UK DAB station ===
In June 2024, a new station using the Atlantic 252 name and playing similar music to the original 1990s station launched on a number of DAB digital radio multiplexes in North West England. Other than the use of the name, this station is not connected to the original Atlantic 252. In addition, another station - Atlantic 252 Classics featuring music played by the station also broadcasts online.
