= BBC Radio Manchester =

Coordinates: 53.473°N 2.298°W

- Salford; England
- Broadcast area: Greater Manchester
- Frequencies: FM: 95.1 MHz (Greater Manchester, western High Peak & north-east Cheshire); FM: 104.6 MHz (Tameside and Saddleworth); DAB: 11C; Freeview: 711
- RDS: BBC Manc

Programming
- Language: English
- Format: Local news, talk and music
- Network: BBC Local Radio

Ownership
- Owner: BBC
- Operator: BBC North West

History
- First air date: 10 September 1970
- Former names: BBC GMR (1988–2006); GMR Talk (1997); BBC Manchester
- Former frequencies: 1296 MW; 1457 MW

Technical information
- Licensing authority: Ofcom

Links
- Website: www.bbc.co.uk/radiomanchester

BBC Radio Manchester is the BBC's local radio station serving Greater Manchester. It broadcasts on FM, DAB, digital TV and via BBC Sounds from studios at MediaCityUK in Salford Quays.

According to RAJAR, the station has a weekly audience of 193,000 listeners and a 2.3% share as of June 2025.

== History ==
=== BBC Radio Manchester (1970–1988) ===
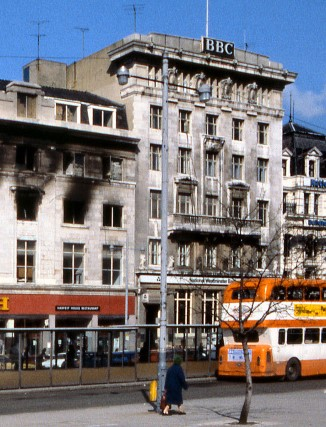
Piccadilly Studios, home of Radio Manchester between 1970 and 1975

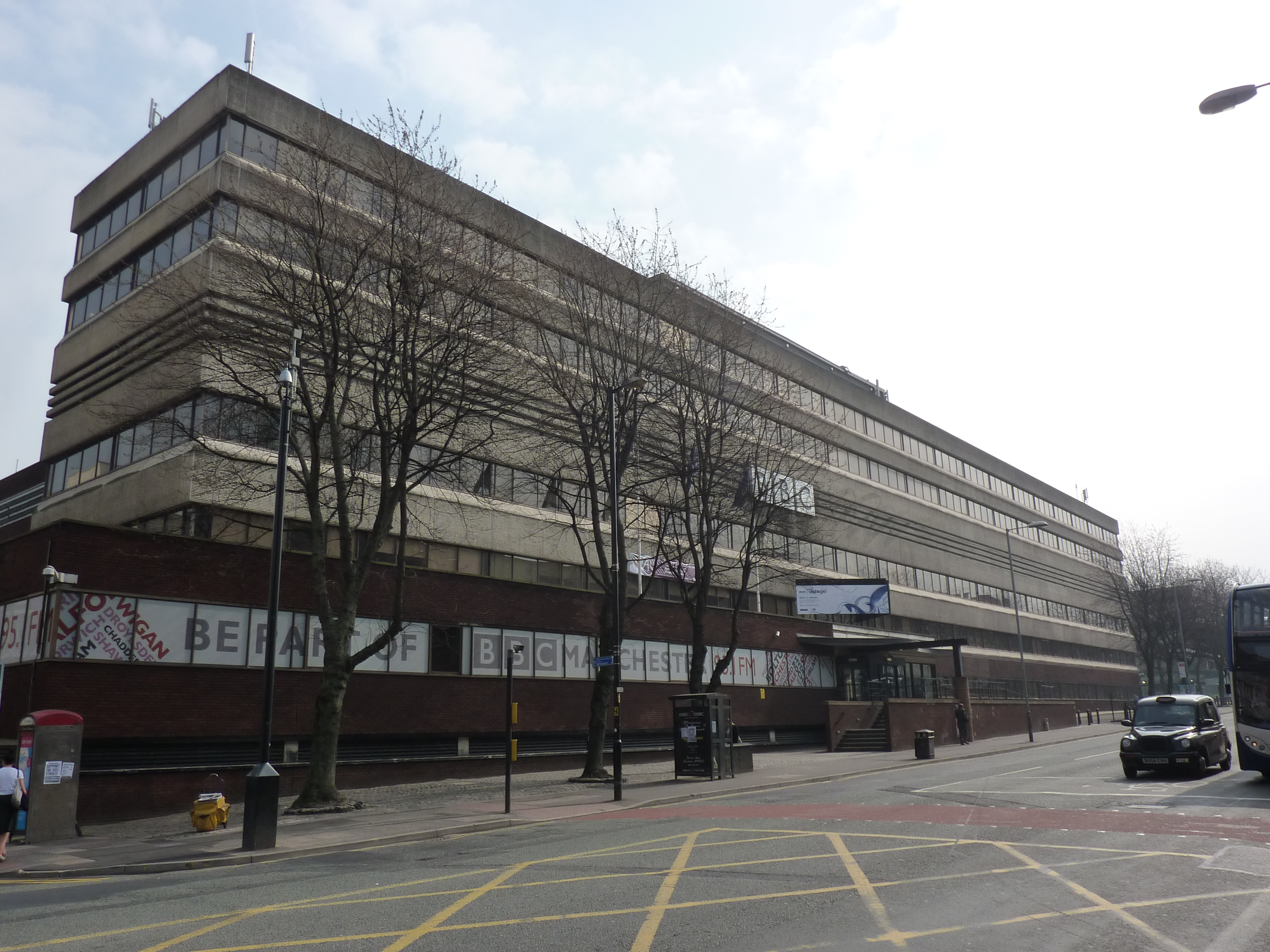
BBC New Broadcasting House, Oxford Road, home of Radio Manchester between 1975 and 2011

BBC Radio Manchester launched at 6 am on 10 September 1970 as the first local radio station in the city of Manchester. The first voice on air was Alan Sykes. Initially broadcasting from studios at 33 Piccadilly overlooking Piccadilly Gardens in the city centre, the station's long-standing home was New Broadcasting House on Oxford Road. Radio Manchester originally broadcast only on 95.1 VHF (FM); the frequency of 206 metres (1457 kHz), on the AM medium wave band was added in 1972, originally from a low-powered transmitter in Cheetham Hill before the more powerful Ashton Moss transmitter went on air in 1976. Other presenters included Roy Cross, Sandra Chalmers, Mike Riddoch and Alex Greenhalgh. A very popular evening show developed from around 1973 to mid 1975 'the Baron from the BBC'.

In the mid-1970s, Radio Manchester was notable for the "Midway through the Day" programme which introduced strip programming and ran from lunchtime until 7 pm. Presenters changed throughout the day, and it was the precursor of the now common chat and music format. At the same time Radio Manchester began an evening programme from 10 pm to midnight which often repeated interviews from "Midway through the Day". By the 1980s, the late evening programming had ended, apart from on Sundays when local programming continued to be broadcast until midnight.

==== Opt-out stations ====
In late 1983 and throughout most of 1984, Radio Manchester ran a series of experimental community stations jointly funded by the BBC and the Greater Manchester County Council, each of which broadcast on 1296 kHz AM in turn. The stations were BBC Radio Oldham (October and November 1983), BBC Radio Bury (late 1983 / early 1984), BBC Radio Trafford (which operated from a mobile studio in a school playground from late February until Easter 1984), BBC Radio Rochdale (eight weeks from 14 May 1984), and BBC Radio Wigan (summer 1984). The stations were part-time services which opted out from the main BBC Radio Manchester service on weekday mornings. The experiments were never repeated.

=== End of MW broadcasting ===
The station stopped broadcasting on medium-wave in September 1992 so that a commercial service could use that frequency although this commercial station - Fortune 1458 - did not go on air until 1994 which meant that the frequency was silent for approximately two years.

=== BBC GMR (1988–2006) ===
Between 30 October 1988 until 3 April 2006, the station was named BBC GMR (Greater Manchester Radio) and, for a brief period in 1997, GMR Talk. Programmes included a phone-in with Allan Beswick (who remained at the station for decades and presented a variety of shows at differing times, finishing his time at the station presenting a late night talk show which was broadcast at weekends and simulcast with BBC Radio Lancashire and BBC Radio Merseyside), late-night music and comedy show Michelle Mullane around Midnight and GMR Brass, a brass band music programme. From 1991, GMR was part of the BBC Night Network.

In 1996, BBC GMR began broadcasting from a second transmitter from Saddleworth on 104.6 FM, (which had and continues to serve as a transmitter for Key 103 for over 20 years). This meant areas of the Upper Tame Valley including Saddleworth and Tameside, down to Hyde saw improved coverage, which was poor at times from Holme Moss transmitting station, especially indoors.

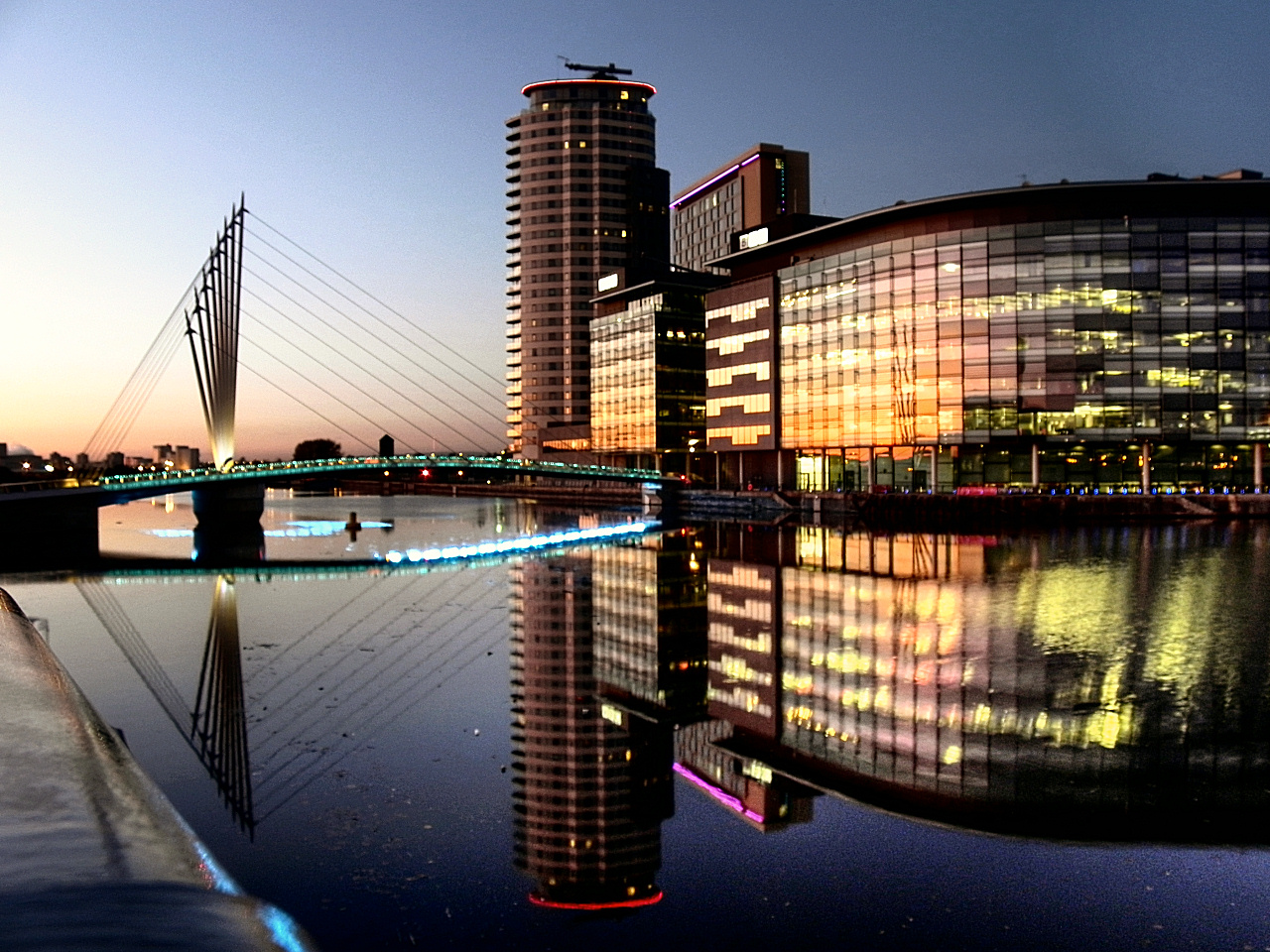
MediaCityUK, home of Radio Manchester since 2011

=== BBC Radio Manchester relaunch (2006–present) ===
After 18 years the station reverted to its original name, Radio Manchester along with a new jingle package composed by IQ Beats. The first voice on the relaunched station was that of Tony Wilson followed by long-time local personality and breakfast presenter Terry Christian, the first song was Manchester by the Beautiful South.

At 6 am on Saturday 8 October 2011, the station ended its transmissions from its Oxford Road studios and began broadcasting from MediaCityUK in Salford Quays. The final show from Oxford Road was presented by Darryl Morris and the first from the new studios by Andy Crane.

== Programming ==
Local programming is produced and broadcast from the BBC's MediaCityUK studios in Salford. Local programming currently airs between 6am and 10pm.

In October 2023, Manchester became one of the host stations for the weeknight editions of the new England-wide BBC local radio late show, broadcast across all stations on the network, from Sunday to Thursday, being presented by Becky Want. Friday and Saturday evenings are broadcast from London. At 1am, the station hands over to BBC Radio 5 Live.

== Technical ==
The main signal is broadcast from the Holme Moss transmitting station on 95.1 FM in West Yorkshire, near the border with Derbyshire in which covers Greater Manchester, north-east Cheshire (Macclesfield, Wilmslow and Knutsford) and north-west Derbyshire (Glossop, New Mills and Chapel-en-le-Frith). Another signal is broadcast from the Saddleworth transmitter on 104.6 FM and covers Tameside and Saddleworth.

The station also broadcasts on DAB from different transmitters such as Winter Hill transmitting station, Saddleworth, Sutton Common and Sunley Building.

The station also broadcasts on Freeview TV channel 711 in the BBC North West region and streams online via BBC Sounds.

== Presenters ==
=== Notable current presenters ===
- Stacey Copeland
- Mark Crossley (Breakfast sport)
- Natalie Pike (Talking Balls)
- Mike Sweeney (Monday to Thursday daytime)
- Becky Want (Monday to Thursday late show across England)

=== Notable former presenters ===
- Allan Beswick
- Gordon Burns
- Sandra Chalmers
- Terry Christian
- Andy Crane (now at Greatest Hits Radio)
- Victoria Derbyshire
- Stephanie Hirst (now at Hits Radio)
- Susie Mathis
- Darryl Morris (now at Times Radio)
- Dianne Oxberry
- Mike Shaft
- Petroc Trelawny
- Tony Wilson

== See also ==
- Manchester Sports
- Eastern Horizon
- Timeline of radio in Manchester
