= Imagine FM =

English radio station

Coordinates: 53.4071°N 2.1541°W

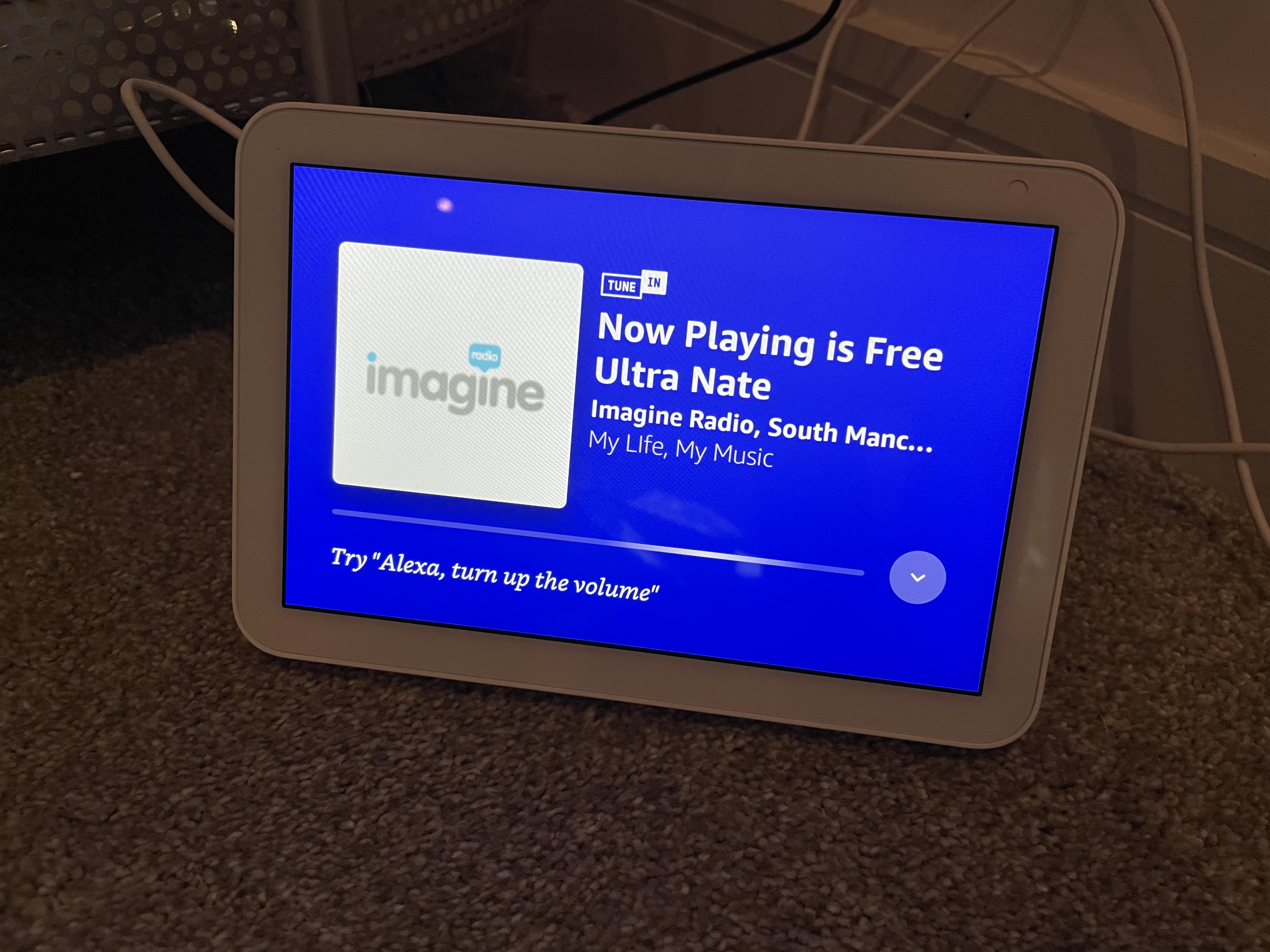

Stockport; England
- Broadcast area: Eastern Greater Manchester, north-west Derbyshire and north Cheshire
- Frequency: 104.9 FM
- Branding: 104.9 Imagine FM

Programming
- Format: Adult contemporary

Ownership
- Owner: Bauer Media Group

History
- First air date: 1990
- Last air date: 1 September 2021

Links
- Website: imagineradiouk.co

Imagine FM was an Independent Local Radio station based in Stockport broadcasting to South Manchester and Cheshire in the North West of England.

== History ==
The station began its life as KFM, initially as a pirate local radio station based in Stockport and broadcasting to the South Manchester/North Cheshire area on 94.2 MHz and then on 1017 kHz.

KFM ran during the 1980s and then relaunched legitimately as one of the first 'incremental' local commercial stations in 1990, set up to provide more localised and specialised programming.

Stoke-on-Trent based Signal Radio assumed control of the station, following difficulties in its latter incarnation, and KFM became memorable almost solely for its 7:00 p.m. – 1:00 a.m. Night-time KFM output. This combined local and global new indie music with innovative DJing.

Presenters on air at this time include Craig Cash, Caroline Aherne, Jon Ronson, Terry Christian and Neil Cossar, all of which have gone on to forge successful careers in the media and performing arts.

KFM was succeeded by Signal Cheshire.

Imagine FM is now trading as an independent radio station since it was bought from UTV Radio in January 2009.

=== Signal Cheshire ===
In 1990 a new service was launched, in Cheshire, on 96.4 FM called Echo 96. In 1991, this was renamed Signal Cheshire upon the acquisition of the KFM 104.9 transmitter. Based in Stockport, Signal Cheshire targeted the surrounding area of South Manchester and much of Cheshire, opting into networked programming from the Stoke-on-Trent site by night. There was a further change of identity in 1997 to Signal FM.

In 2000, Imagine FM became the new rebranded service on 104.9 and 96.4, and when the 104.9 frequency was readvertised, the then-owners of both stations, The Wireless Group, decided that the 96.4 transmitter should return to Signal One.

The station uses the tag line Cheshire's No.1 More Music Station and prides itself on updating the area with local news and information.

The transmitter is based close to Stockport town centre.

=== 2009 sale ===
On Wednesday 21 May 2008, Ofcom rejected a request by UTV to co-locate the station to Warrington alongside three of its stations. As a result of Ofcom's decision, UTV placed Imagine FM up for sale in June 2008, stating that if a buyer cannot be found by 30 June 2008 then the station's licence would be handed back to Ofcom. The station was sold by former Imagine owners UTV Radio in January 2009 and now trades as Imagine FM Limited. After 20 years of the 104.9 wavelength being based at Regent House, Stockport, Imagine FM moved to Waterloo Place, Stockport in November 2010 and now broadcasts from the legendary Strawberry Studios.

The transmitter was also relocated from Romiley to Stockport centre at the same time.

Under the ownership of the Helius Media Group, Imagine came under common ownership, and began to share programming with High Peak Radio in the Derbyshire dales.

=== 2021 sale and relaunch ===
On 17 June 2021, it was announced that Bauer Radio would acquire the Imagine Radio services and add these to the Greatest Hits Radio network, further expanding GHR's coverage of both the Greater Manchester environs (following the earlier addition of Tower FM, Wish FM, Wire FM and most recently 96.2 The Revolution to the group) and Derbyshire (where GHR already occupies the former Peak FM).
