= Hits Radio Staffordshire & Cheshire =

Coordinates: 53.0111°N 2.1834°W

- Stoke-on-Trent; United Kingdom
- Broadcast area: North Staffordshire and South Cheshire
- Frequencies: FM: 102.6 MHz (Stoke-on-Trent); DAB: 12D
- RDS: Hits
- Branding: The Biggest Hits, The Biggest Throwbacks; Across Staffordshire and Cheshire

Programming
- Format: Contemporary hit radio
- Network: Hits Radio

Ownership
- Owner: Bauer Media Audio UK
- Sister stations: Greatest Hits Radio Staffordshire & Cheshire

History
- First air date: 5 September 1983
- Former names: Signal Radio; Signal 1
- Former frequencies: 104.3 MHz; 1170 MW; 96.4 MHz (Congleton and Macclesfield); 96.9 MHz (Stafford)

Links
- Webcast: Rayo
- Website: hellorayo.co.uk/hits-radio/staffordshire

Hits Radio Staffordshire & Cheshire, formerly Signal 1, is an Independent Local Radio station owned and operated by Bauer Media Audio UK as part of the Hits Radio network. It broadcasts to North Staffordshire and South Cheshire.

As of September 2024, the station has a weekly audience of 173,000 listeners according to RAJAR.

== History ==
Signal Radio began broadcasting at 6 a.m. on Monday 5 September 1983. The first voice on air was breakfast presenter John Evington and the first song played was Beautiful Noise by Neil Diamond. Originally, Signal Radio aired as a single full service station on 104.3 MHz and 1170 kHz (257 metres). The station's name was derived from Signal, the local newspaper in the Five Town novels by Staffordshire writer Arnold Bennett.

Signal began broadcasting to South Cheshire on 96.4 FM in 1989, before opening a new frequency for the Stafford area on 96.9 FM a year later. The two frequencies began carrying a new alternative AOR-led service, Echo 96, in October 1990. Echo continued for around a year in Stafford while the Cheshire frequency was merged with that of the short-lived Stockport ILR station KFM to form Signal Cheshire in 1991. By the end of the year, the Stafford service was relaunched as Signal Stafford, carrying opt-out programming from the Stoke-based service.

In Staffordshire, Signal Radio began carrying a separate Golden Breakfast Show on 1170 AM in 1992 in order to provide separate services on AM and FM and avoid relinquishing frequencies. The AM opt-out gradually expanded into a full-time separate station, Signal 2.

Signal Radio was bought in 1999 by The Wireless Group, which was subsequently acquired by UTV Media six years later for £97 million. Following the sale of its television assets, the group was latterly bought by News Corp in September 2016.

In 2000, Signal's Cheshire service was split into two – 96.4 FM was merged with the Staffordshire service while 104.9 FM was relaunched as Imagine FM, a dedicated service for south Manchester and Cheshire, which was latterly sold onto become a wholly independent station in 2009.

Signal 1 celebrated its 30th birthday on Saturday 10 August 2013 with a special concert at Betley Court Farm in Crewe.

On 8 February 2019, Signal 1 and the Wireless Group's network of local radio stations in Great Britain were sold to Bauer. The sale was ratified in March 2020 following an inquiry by the Competition and Markets Authority.

In May 2020, Bauer announced that Signal 1 would join the Hits Radio network, while retaining its on-air branding.

Signal 1 began carrying off-peak programming from the Hits Radio network in Manchester on 15 June 2020, marking the end of networked output for the Wireless Group's local stations, produced in-house at Signal's studios in Stoke.

Signal 1 officially joined the Hits Radio network on 20 July 2020. Local programming was reduced to a weekday breakfast show, alongside hourly local news bulletins and peak-time traffic updates.

In November 2022 it was announced that from the following January, Signal 1's relay transmitters on 96.4 and 96.9 FM would transition to carrying Greatest Hits Radio, with the main 102.6 FM transmission – to the area where GHR broadcasts on AM via the former Signal 2 – retaining Signal 1 and Hits Radio network output.

In December 2023, Bauer Media announced that Signal 1 would be leaving its Stoke base and relocating to Bauer's Birmingham studios, co-locating with Free Radio and Greatest Hits Radio Midlands.

=== Hits Radio rebrand ===
On 10 January 2024, station owners Bauer announced Signal 1 will be rebranded as Hits Radio Staffordshire and Cheshire from 17 April 2024, as part of a network-wide relaunch involving 17 local radio stations in England and Wales. The announcement marked the end of the Signal Radio brand after over 40 years of broadcasting

On 20 March 2025, Bauer announced it would end its regional Hits Radio breakfast show for the Staffordshire and Cheshire to be replaced by a new national breakfast show for England and Wales on 9 June 2025. Local news and traffic bulletins were retained but the station's Birmingham studios were closed.

The station's final local programme aired on 6 June 2025.

== Station information ==
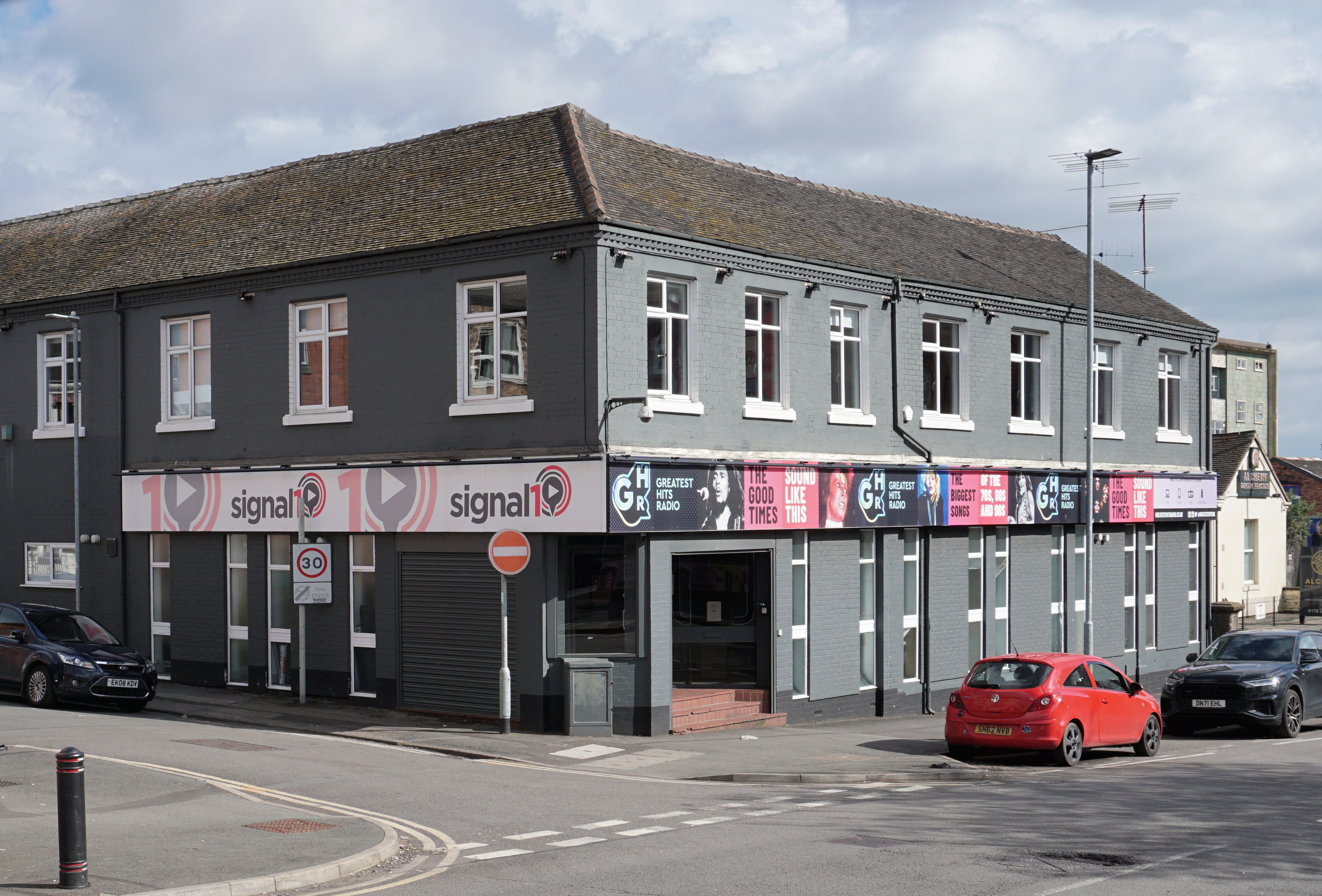
Former studios of Signal 1 and Greatest Hits Radio

=== Studios ===
Until 2024, Signal 1's studios were based on Stoke Road in the Shelton area of Stoke-on-Trent in a building previously occupied as a warehouse. There were seven dedicated studios as well as a studio for live music recordings, previously used for Signal 2 and networked output for the Wireless Group.

Hits Radio Staffordshire & Cheshire now broadcasts its breakfast show from Bauer's Birmingham studios, co-locating with Hits Radio Birmingham and Greatest Hits Radio Midlands.

=== Technical ===
Signal 1's main transmitter is at Alsagers Bank, broadcasting on 102.6 FM. As well as covering North Staffordshire and South Cheshire, the transmitter can be received well into the North West and down into the West Midlands, due to the height of the transmitter. Signal 1 also had relay transmitters at Pye Green, covering Stafford and the surrounding area on 96.9 FM, and at Sutton Common, covering Congleton, Macclesfield and surrounding areas on 96.4 FM. However, in January 2023, these switched over to carrying Greatest Hits Radio Staffordshire and Cheshire.

Signal 1 also broadcasts on the local Stoke and Stafford DAB multiplex 12D.

=== Signal Radio Media Academy ===
In 2012, Signal 1 lent its name to the Signal Radio Media Academy, a course run by Stoke on Trent College as a BTEC Level 3 Extended Diploma in Radio Production. For two days a week, the course is based at the Burslem Campus of Stoke on Trent College where the students also run their own radio station, Heatwave Radio. Teaching takes places both at the college in Burslem as well at Signal's studios in Shelton, with specialist input from the station's staff.

=== Outside broadcasting and events ===
Occasional outside broadcasts are made in a specially built OB studio on a converted bus. The station's roadshow unit has a self-contained stage and PA system on board. The Signal Radio Street Team also go out and about the area representing the station. Most Street Team members are part of the Signal Radio Media Academy and many have gone on to other roles across the network including presenting, producing and sales.

In more recent years, Signal Radio also hosted annual events for local children's charities under the Help a Signal Child banner.

== Programming ==
Hits Radio network programming is broadcast and produced from Bauer’s London headquarters or studios in Manchester & occasionally Newcastle.

=== News ===
Hits Radio Staffordshire and Cheshire broadcasts local news bulletins on the hour from 6am-7pm on weekdays and between 7am-1pm at weekends, with headlines on the half hour during breakfast and drivetime on weekdays. The local bulletins are created by a Staffordshire and Cheshire news team. There is a roving reporter on-the-ground who sources and delivers reports from across the patch, predominately in heartland areas like Stoke-on-Trent, Stafford and Crewe.

National bulletins from Sky News Radio in London are broadcast on the hour at all other times.
