= Wythenshawe FM =

Radio station in Wythenshawe, England

Coordinates: 53.3800°N 2.2650°W

- England
- Broadcast area: Manchester
- Frequency: 97.2 MHz

Programming
- Format: Community

Ownership
- Owner: Independent

History
- First air date: 6 May 2002

Links
- Website: wfmradio.org

Wythenshawe FM 97.2, also known as WFM, is a community radio station broadcasting primarily to Wythenshawe, Manchester and the surrounding south Manchester area. It is recognised as the first station of its type in the UK, gaining a full-time licence in 2005 and is run entirely by volunteers.

== History ==
The first iteration of Wythenshawe FM began on 25 May 2000.

In 2014, Wythenshawe FM was awarded the Queen's Award for Voluntary service.

In 2021, the station breached the conditions of its OFCOM license by failing to submit its financial reports on time.

In October 2023, the station began broadcasting on DAB across south Manchester, Tameside, Stockport and the High Peak.

In 2024, the station was one of 14 nationwide to receive funding from Ofcom.
