= The Revolution (radio station) =

Revolution 96.2
- Oldham; England
- Broadcast area: Oldham, Rochdale, Tameside
- Frequencies: FM: 96.2 MHz; DAB: 10B
- RDS: Rev_96.2

Programming
- Language: English
- Format: Adult contemporary

History
- First air date: 30 August 1999
- Last air date: 16 November 2020

Technical information
- Transmitter coordinates: 53.5425°N 2.1168°W

Revolution 96.2 was an Independent Local Radio station serving the Oldham, Rochdale and Tameside areas of Greater Manchester.

Following its sale to Bauer Media Audio UK, the station was closed and merged with the Greatest Hits Radio network in November 2020.

== History ==
Oldham FM Limited was incorporated on 5 June 1997 - Bernard Stone, Philip Hirst and Christopher Hirst of Hirst Kidd and Rennie Ltd., owners of local newspaper Oldham Evening Chronicle, were appointed company directors. The following December, David Bruce and Stephen Kitney of UK Radio Developments LTD, as well as Nichola Atkinson, John Gracie and Liam Forristal were also added as company directors.

The owners launched a bid for a full-time broadcasting licence, while using a series of temporary RSL licences, broadcasting for one month per year from 1994 onwards. After five years, a licence was granted. On 30 August 1999, Oldham FM began broadcasting under the name 96.2 The Revolution. The name was chosen because of the Industrial Revolution, in which the region took a major role, and the initial letters of its three main target areas – Revolution.

The Revolution initially ran a mainstream pop and rock music format, but in 2005, the station's playlist changed to a specialist mix of new and classic alternative, soul & rock and roll music, spanning the last 40 years. Inspiral Carpets keyboard player Clint Boon briefly took over as its head of music, before leaving to join rival station XFM Manchester.

Following a big fall in listening figures, The Revolution was put up for sale in 2008, and its music format reverted to heavily rotated mainstream pop and rock - a change reportedly imposed by the station's owner during an afternoon in late August 2008. Most of the station's presenters walked out, resulting in long periods of non-stop automated music.

A fortnight after the walkout, it was announced that The Revolution had been purchased by former Key 103 and Capital FM presenter Steve Penk, who reverted the format change and took over the station's breakfast show.

In January 2014, Penk sold the radio station to Credible Media, which sought to create stronger links with local businesses and institutions in the target service area.

On 30 August 2015, Niocast Digital began a trial of broadcasting six radio stations on small-scale DAB multiplex 10B in Greater Manchester, including The Revolution.

On 23 October 2020, it was announced Bauer had bought the station. Revolution 96.2 ceased broadcasting on 16 November 2020 and was replaced by Greatest Hits Radio North West.

== Audience ==
Audience figures
Year	Quarter		Share
2000	Q1-2	4.6%
2000	Q3-4	6.3%
2001	Q1-2	5.2%
2001	Q3-4	6.1%
2002	Q1-2	7.9%
2002	Q3-4	7.4%
2003	Q1-2	6.9%
2003	Q3-4	5.7%
2004	Q1-2	6.1%
2004	Q3-4	4.4%
2005	Q1-2	4.1%
2005	Q3-4	4.6%
2006	Q1-2	5.2%
2006	Q3-4	4.8%
2007	Q1-2	1.5%
2007	Q3-4	0.8%
2008	Q1-2	1.4%
2008	Q3-4	1.1%
2009	Q1-2	2.8%
2009	Q3-4	4.0%
2010	Q1-2	3.5%
2010	Q3-4	2.0%
2011	Q1-2	5.4%
2011	Q3-4	3.2%
2012	Q1-2	2.6%
2012	Q3-4	2.1%
2013	Q1-2	4.1%
2013	Q3-4	2.7%
2014	Q1-2	2.3%
2014	Q3-4	2.1%
2015	Q1-2	2.8%
2015	Q3-4	1.6%

== Notable presenters ==
- James H. Reeve
- Pat Sharp
- Donny Osmond
- Gary Mounfield
- Martin Coogan
- Steve Penk
- Clint Boon
