= Chat =

Chat or chats may refer to:

== Communication ==
- Conversation, particularly casual
- Online chat, text message communication over the Internet in real-time
  - Text messaging
    - SMS chat
    - A popular term for internet relay chat
    - Chat room or group chat
  - Instant messaging
  - Video chat

== Entertainment ==
- Chat (magazine), a British weekly women's magazine
- CHAT-FM, a radio station (94.5 FM) licensed to Medicine Hat, Alberta, Canada
- CHAT-TV, a television station (channel 6) licensed to Medicine Hat, Alberta, Canada
- Le Chat, a Belgian comic strip
- Sophia "Chat" Sanduval, a Marvel Comics character
- Chat Chat, a 1995 album by Takako Minekawa
- Chat show, a radio and television format

== Places ==
- Chat, Iran, a village in Iran
- Chat, Kyrgyzstan, a village in Kyrgyzstan
- Chat, Turkmenistan, a Russian fort at the mouth of the Sumbar River in 1879
- Chat, California, an alternate name of Chats, USA

== Science and medicine ==
- Checklist for Autism in Toddlers, used in autism screening
- Choline acetyltransferase, an enzyme that synthesises acetylcholine
- (Z)-3-hexen-1-ol acetyltransferase, an enzyme

=== Birds ===
- Chat (bird), Old World flycatchers of subfamily Saxicolinae, which resemble small thrushes, as well as:
- Australian chats, songbirds of genera Ashbyia and Epthianura (family Meliphagidae)
- American chats, songbirds of genus Granatellus (family Cardinalidae)
- Yellow-breasted chat (Icteria virens), an enigmatic North American songbird of unresolved affiliations

== Other uses ==
- ChatGPT, a chatbot developed by OpenAI
- Chat (mining), the waste rocks produced in mining
- Chat (ppp), an automated conversational script with a modem
- ChatBot, an AI customer service platform developed by Text
- Community Hebrew Academy of Toronto, a Jewish secondary school in Toronto
- Choosing Healthplans All Together, a health insurance choosing exercise
- Cultural-historical activity theory, in social psychology
- Chāt or chaat, Indian and Pakistani savoury snacks
- Codes for the Human Analysis of Transcripts, a format used by the CHILDES project

=== Chats ===
- Chats or Chat Tatars, ethnic group in Siberia
- The Chats, Australian garage punk band

== See also ==
- Chat room (disambiguation)
- Le Chat (disambiguation)
- Khat, a plant with stimulant properties in humans
- Chatroulette, service for random chat all around the world
