= Outtake =

Portion of a work, film or music recording, that is removed in the editing process

An outtake is a portion of a work (usually a film or music recording) that is removed in the editing process and not included in the work's final, publicly released version. In the digital era, significant outtakes have been appended to CD and DVD reissues of many albums and films as bonus tracks or features, in film often, but not always, for the sake of humor. In terms of photos, an outtake may also mean the ones which are not released in the original set of photos (i.e. photo shoots and digitals).

== Film ==
An outtake is any take of a movie or a television program that is removed or otherwise not used in the final cut. Some of these takes are humorous mistakes made in the process of filming (commonly known to American audiences as bloopers). Multiple takes of each shot are always taken, for safety. Due to this, the number of outtakes a film has will always vastly outnumber the takes included in the edited, finished product.

An outtake may also be a complete version of a recording that is dropped in favor of another version.

Often outtakes can be found as special features on DVDs and Blu-rays. Purpose-made "outtakes" can also be found playing over credits at the end of a film or TV program. Well known examples of this are Jackie Chan and Disney/Pixar films, although in the latter only three movies were made with such as (A Bug's Life, Toy Story 2, and Monsters, Inc.). Pixar films, being computer-generated, do not feature "real" outtakes, but rather staged ones in which the animation features "mistakes".

Outtakes may also enter stock footage libraries and appear in future productions. For example, Don't Tell Everything (1921) started as an outtake from The Affairs of Anatol (1921) and was then expanded with additional footage.

It is generally considered that the inclusion of outtakes in a film's finished product started with Hooper (1978), helmed by stunt-man-turned-director Hal Needham and starring Burt Reynolds. Needham decided to include outtakes in the film's end credit scrawl to highlight alternate camera angles for the impressive stunts performed for the movie. Needham also interspersed comedic outtakes of the actors as well.

The inclusion was so successful with fans that Needham continued to insert comedic outtakes in his future directorial efforts such as Smokey and the Bandit II (1980), The Cannonball Run (1981), Stroker Ace (1983) and Cannonball Run 2 (1984).

=== Criticism ===
Film critic Gene Siskel has been critical of outtakes being played over a film's credits, saying of the film Liar Liar:

This picture ends over the credits with outtakes. I hate that. I don't even care if they're funny, I still hate it because to me it's almost like an act of desperation from the filmmakers saying "Well we're not sure if we made a funny picture, but we're gonna throw this stuff in and we'll leave you laughing on the way out."

== Television ==
The British programme It'll Be Alright on the Night, has been running on ITV since 1977 featuring outtakes. The BBC's answer to this was Auntie's Bloomers, eventually replaced by Outtake TV. Prior to these series, production errors were rarely seen for pre-recorded programmes, since these were edited out before transmission. Nowadays, it is common to see outtakes at the end of films, or compiled into programmes like these.

== Music ==
Just like a movie outtake, music outtakes are recordings that are not used in a final version of an album. Collections of this sort of material are often compiled and distributed illegally by fans, and known as a bootlegged recording. Sometimes, artists release collections of outtakes, sometimes grouped with other rarities such as demos and unreleased songs.

Occasionally collections of outtakes become recognized as part of an artist's major creative output, especially in cases where an artist is unusually prolific or dies young. One example would be The Lillywhite Sessions by Dave Matthews Band, an album that was considered unfinished and not ready to be distributed, yet is widely considered part of the discography of the band by their fans. An example of the former is the ongoing Bootleg Series from Bob Dylan, which contains many important Dylan songs omitted from his albums, some of which were made famous by other artists. An example of the latter is the CD Time of No Reply by Nick Drake, a British singer-songwriter who died almost unknown at the age of 26 in 1974, but whose music became highly influential on other artists in subsequent decades.

== Video games ==
In a similar vein as a music outtake, video game outtakes are elements (characters, levels, items, cutscenes, etc.) that were not used in a game's final version. These can be unlocked via hacking or officially through demos.

Examples include Crash Bandicoot, whose notable abandoned level "Stormy Ascent" can be unlocked through hacking. Similarly, Donkey Kong, Silver the Hedgehog, Cream the Rabbit, Jet the Hawk, Espio the Chameleon, Big the Cat and a Goomba can be unlocked via hacking on Mario & Sonic at the Olympic Games.

== See also ==
- Blooper
- Deleted scene
