= Uncle Don =

American children's radio program

Uncle Don's Strange Adventures, a 1936 Big Little Book from the Whitman Publishing Company, featured a story about Uncle Don and his adventures with a mystery cruiser.

Uncle Don is a children's radio program that aired on WOR radio from 1928 to 1948. The host was Uncle Don Carney, a former vaudeville performer (real name Howard Rice, 1897–1954). The half-hour program was broadcast daily, five or six days a week.

== History ==
Debuting September 1928, it was the most popular children's show of that era due to the powerful 50,000-watt transmitter of WOR. Carney sang, played the piano, told stories and introduced a variety of features: the "Earnest Savers Club" which encouraged setting up accounts at the Greenwich Savings Bank; a "Healthy Child Contest"; a "Talent Quest" that provided screen tests for winners. Each program began with Uncle Don arriving in the imaginary autogyro he called his "puddle-jumper." His opening song was widely known:

"Hello, nephews, nieces mine,
I'm glad to see you look so fine.
How's Mama and how's Papa, but first
just tell me how you are.
I've many things to tell you on your radio.
This is Uncle Don, your Uncle Don.
Hello, little friends, hello."

In 1938–1939, the program was carried on the Mutual Broadcasting System.

== Personnel ==
Over the program's long run, announcers included Jack Barry, Joe Bolton, Norman Brokenshire, Barry Gray, Arthur Hale, Frank Knight, Henry Morgan, and Floyd Neal.

== Books ==
Uncle Don's Strange Adventures, a 1936 Big Little Book, retells Carney's story about a mystery cruiser.

== Urban legend ==
For decades, a widespread rumor claimed that one night Uncle Don had inadvertently spoken into an open microphone, saying "We're off? Good, that ought to hold the little bastards." However, this has been debunked as untrue. The rumor was later resurrected in the 1950s, when an audio recording of the "mistake" turned up on a Kermit Schaefer Bloopers album, though this was later shown to be a fake recreation. (Some sources, such as John Dunning's Encyclopedia of Old-Time Radio, claim that Carney always denied the rumours; others say that he actually admitted the gaffe to friends, even though he knew it never happened.) Ultimately, this became attributed to later children's shows as well.

This scenario, a host inadvertently talking into an open microphone at the end of a live show, was used as a comeuppance for lead character Lonesome Rhodes in the fictional film drama, A Face in the Crowd. Amplifying the urban legend, a scene in that film shows two real Variety pressmen handling an issue of Variety with a headline reading "L.R. BLOOPER TOPS UNK DON'S" comparing Rhodes to Uncle Don.

As a play on the urban legend, jazz musician Sonny Rollins sometimes introduced himself, facetiously, as "Uncle Don", a nickname that continues to this day. On A Night at the Village Vanguard (Blue Note, 1957), he says, "Good afternoon everybody, boys and girls. This is Uncle Don. (laughter)...Good afternoon, my name is Sonny Rollins."
