= List of programs broadcast by This TV =

The following is an article listing television series that are and were broadcast or have previously aired on This TV, a digital broadcast network owned by Allen Media Group.

This TV's programming consisted of syndicated television series that Allen Media Group has ownership rights, E/I compliant children's programming, and some religious programs on Sunday mornings. This TV devoted a large portion of its schedule to movies licensed from MGM Studios until January 1, 2024.

== Final programming ==
=== Drama programming ===
- The Avengers (2018–2024)
- The Saint (2018–2024)
- In the Heat of the Night (2013–2024)
- Sea Hunt (2009–2012; 2013–2024)
- The Rat Patrol

=== Reality programming ===
- Deadline to Disaster (2024)
- ES.TV
- Highway Thru Hell (2024)
- Justice for All with Judge Cristina Perez
- Recipe.TV
- SOS: How to Survive (2024)
- Storm of Suspicion (2024)
- Top 10 (2024)
- The Verdict with Judge Hatchett
- Weather Gone Viral (2024)
- Weird Earth (2024)
- Who Wants to Date a Comedian?
- The World's Funniest Weather (2024)

=== Western programming ===
- Bat Masterson (2009–2012; 2016–2024)
- Mackenzie's Raiders (2016–2024)

=== Children’s programming ===
- On the Spot ^{E/I} (2013–2016)
- Zoo Clues ^{E/I} (2013–2016)
- Awesome Adventures ^{E/I}
- Whaddyado ^{E/I}
- Wild About Animals ^{E/I}
- Wild World at the San Diego Zoo ^{E/I}
- The Young Icons ^{E/I}
- Career Day ^{E/I}
- Get Wild at the San Diego Zoo ^{E/I} (2016–2024)
- Science Nation ^{E/I}

=== Religious programming ===
- In Touch with Dr. Charles Stanley
- The Key of David
- Leading the Way with Dr. Michael Youssef

=== Space programming ===
- Stargate SG-1
