= It'll Be Alright on the Night =

British TV bloopers series (since 1977)

- Presented by: Denis Norden; Griff Rhys Jones
- Narrated by: David Walliams; Tom Allen
- Opening theme: Export International by Graham de Wilde (1981); It'll Be Alright on the Night by Rod Argent and Peter Van Hooke (1990–)
- Country of origin: United Kingdom
- Original language: English
- No. of series: 37
- No. of episodes: 69

Production
- Production location: The London Studios (1977–2016)
- Running time: 30–60 minutes (including adverts)
- Production companies: LWT (1977–2004); Granada (2004–2006); ITV Productions (2008); ITV Studios (2011–2021); Lifted Entertainment (2021–present)

Original release
- Network: ITV; Channel 4 (July 1985)
- Release: 18 September 1977 – present

Related
- Auntie's Bloomers; Outtake TV; TV's Bloopers & Practical Jokes; TV's Naughtiest Blunders

It'll Be Alright on the Night is a British television bloopers programme broadcast on ITV and produced by ITV Studios. It was one of the first series created with the specific purpose of showing behind the scenes bloopers from film and TV.

The programme was originally presented by Denis Norden from 1977 until 2006. Griff Rhys Jones took over as presenter from 2008 until 2016. From 2018, the series was narrated by David Walliams. Tom Allen took over narration duties from December 2025. The programme's success led to the competing BBC One series Auntie's Bloomers and inspired the spin-off programme Denis Norden's Laughter File.

== Format ==
The programme is usually one hour in length and aired in ITV's Saturday evening entertainment slot. However, some of the first few episodes up to and including It'll be Alright on the Night 6 which aired on 2 December 1990, originally went out on a Sunday evening. Two episodes also debuted on a Friday: It'll be Alright on the Night 3 and It'll be Alright on Christmas Night on Christmas Day 1981 and 1987 respectively. The programme's success led to the competing BBC One series Auntie's Bloomers presented by Terry Wogan, which focused on bloopers from some of the BBC archives.

The programme followed a simple format. Norden, traditionally holding a clipboard in his hand, appeared on an otherwise empty stage and delivered a humorous piece to camera, followed by a selection of outtakes taken from various sources. Popular sources for clips include numerous British and American sitcoms, news reports and foreign broadcasts.

The programme returned in September 2008 with Griff Rhys Jones who presented 11 episodes of It'll be Alright on the Night. The last episode featuring Rhys Jones was broadcast on 4 June 2016. After a two-year break, the programme returned in summer 2018 with brand new episodes featuring David Walliams as narrator, instead of a presenter in the studio. New editions of the programme, narrated again by Walliams, began airing from September 2020. These editions introduced a new feature entitled the 'Big Cock-Up Question' where before each advert break, a small portion of a clip would be played before it stops and Walliams asks viewers to guess what happens next, the answer being revealed following the break.

== Broadcasting ==
Although a staple of ITV's light entertainment programming for more than 40 years, few editions of It'll be Alright on the Night have been produced, with rarely more than one new episode a year being screened. Episodes presented by Denis Norden have normally included a number in their title screens to aid identification with the audience, while from 2008 to 2016, episodes presented by Griff Rhys Jones and from 2018 onwards, episodes narrated by David Walliams no longer did so. Towards the end of the Denis Norden era, episodes up to and including It'll be Alright on the Night 20 were prefixed with "All New" to avoid viewer confusion with repeat screenings of earlier episodes.

During its run, several special episodes were also made, including anniversary specials, a late night edition for Channel 4 with more mature adult content and a one-off political special to mark the 2001 general election.

The majority of the episodes were filmed at The London Studios, but in the programme's later years, the Granada studios in Manchester were also used, as well as the now-closed (and demolished) Meridian studios at Northam, Southampton. A few editions were also filmed on-location; these included Alright on the Night's Cockup Trip which was presented from the Great Cockup fell in the Lake District, 21 Years of Alright on the Night was presented on a yacht supposedly in the middle of the Bermuda Triangle (which, in reality, was in the south of France) and It'll be Alright on the Night 11, which was presented from an empty Haymarket Theatre, London.

During its run, the series has had three main producers: Paul Smith (1977–1984), Paul Lewis (1984–2002) and Simon Withington (2003–2006). Sean Miller, James Sunderland and Stephanie Dennis also produced some episodes. Grant Philpott was the series producer (2011, 2012 and 2018) and Simon Withington, who previously served as a producer from 2003 to 2006 has been the executive producer from 2014 to 2016. In 2020, Chris Thornton became the series producer.

=== Episodes ===
The audience figures (where given) are those for the initial transmission of an episode. In the early years of the series, episodes sometimes achieved higher ratings on repeat showings. For instance, It'll be Alright on the Night 2 (first shown on 28 October 1979) was watched by 16 million viewers for a repeat showing in February 1983, while It'll be Alright on the Night 4 (first shown on 11 March 1984) was watched by 18.5 million viewers on its initial repeat in January 1985. A further repeat of The Second Worst of Alright on the Night (first shown on 24 November 1985) achieved the programme's highest ratings of 19.92 million in February 1992. Since January 2026, episodes are now thirty minutes in length and broadcast in two parts.

Episode	Episode name	Original airdate	Presenter/Narrator	Viewers (millions)	Ref.
1	It'll be Alright on the Night 1	18 September 1977	Denis Norden	16.45	
2	It'll be Alright on the Night 2	28 October 1979	Denis Norden	—N/a	
3	The Worst of Alright on the Night	21 September 1980	Denis Norden	—N/a	
4	It'll be Alright on the Night 3	25 December 1981	Denis Norden	—N/a	
5	It'll be Alright on the Night 4	11 March 1984	Denis Norden	16.90	
6	It'll be Alright Late at Night	11 July 1985	Denis Norden	—N/a	
7	The Second Worst of Alright on the Night	24 November 1985	Denis Norden	14.55	
8	It'll be Alright on Christmas Night (Note: Retitled and re-edited as It'll be Alright on the Night 5 for subsequent repeats.)	25 December 1987	Denis Norden	17.95	
9	10 Years of It'll be Alright on the Night	25 December 1988	Denis Norden	—N/a	
10	It'll be Alright on the Night 6	2 December 1990	Denis Norden	17.92	
11	It'll be Alright on the Night 7	2 January 1993	Denis Norden	15.03	
12	The Utterly Worst of Alright on the Night	10 April 1994	Denis Norden	—N/a	
13	The Kids from Alright on the Night	26 November 1994	Denis Norden	—N/a	
14	It'll be Alright on the Night 8	10 December 1994	Denis Norden	13.74	1
15	Alright on the Night's Cockup Trip	12 October 1996	Denis Norden	13.00	
16	It'll be Alright on the Night 10	15 November 1997	Denis Norden	—N/a	
17	21 Years of Alright on the Night	24 January 1998	Denis Norden	—N/a	
18	It'll be Alright on the Night 11	2 October 1999	Denis Norden	10.12	
19	It'll be Alright on the Night 12	27 January 2001	Denis Norden	9.17	
20	It'll be Alright on Election Night	7 June 2001	Denis Norden	6.77	
21	It'll be Alright on the Night 13	17 August 2001	Denis Norden	6.61	
22	It'll be Alright on the Night 15: Silver Jubilee Special (Note: Retitled and re-edited as 25 Years of Alright on the Night for subsequent repeats.)	14 September 2002	Denis Norden	8.11	
23	More Kids from Alright on the Night	28 September 2002	Denis Norden	5.61	
24	Alright on the Night's All-Star Special	31 August 2003	Denis Norden	9.63	
25	It'll be Alright on the Night 16	6 September 2003	Denis Norden	5.53	
26	It'll be Alright on the Night 18	2 October 2004	Denis Norden	6.89	
27	It'll be Alright on the Night 19	24 December 2004	Denis Norden	5.84	
28	Alright on the Night's 50 Years of ITV	17 September 2005	Denis Norden	6.28	
29	It'll be Alright on the Night 20	18 March 2006	Denis Norden	5.32	
30	It'll be Alright on the Night 2008: Part 1	20 September 2008	Griff Rhys Jones	4.30	
31	It'll be Alright on the Night 2008: Part 2	25 December 2008	Griff Rhys Jones	3.99	
32	It'll be Alright on the Night 2011: Part 1	28 December 2011	Griff Rhys Jones	4.95	
33	It'll be Alright on the Night 2011: Part 2	31 December 2011	Griff Rhys Jones	3.73	
34	All New It'll be Alright on the Night 2012	28 December 2012	Griff Rhys Jones	3.91	
35	All New It'll be Alright on the Night 2014: Episode 1	5 January 2014	Griff Rhys Jones	3.86	
36	It'll be Alright on the Night's Best of the Worst (also known as All New It'll be Alright on the Night 2014: Episode 2)	12 January 2014	Griff Rhys Jones	3.64	
37	All New It'll be Alright on the Night 2014: Episode 3	19 May 2014	Griff Rhys Jones	3.11	
38	All New It'll be Alright on the Night 2014: Episode 4	28 December 2014	Griff Rhys Jones	3.43	
39	It'll be Alright on the Night 2015	30 December 2015	Griff Rhys Jones	3.80	
40	All New It'll be Alright on the Night 2016	4 June 2016	Griff Rhys Jones	2.76	
41	David Walliams Presents – Return of Alright on the Night	22 August 2018 (Note: Scheduled to be aired on 2 July 2018, but was moved five days later due to the England v Colombia World Cup game going into extra time. The 7 July 2018 date was moved again to 22 August 2018 due to the Russia v Croatia World Cup game going into extra time.)	David Walliams	2.81	
42	David Walliams Presents – Revenge of Alright on the Night	29 August 2018 (Note: Scheduled to be aired on 3 July 2018, but was moved seven days later due to the England v Colombia World Cup game going into extra time. The 10 July 2018 date was moved again to 29 August 2018 due to the Russia v Croatia World Cup game going into extra time.)	David Walliams	2.61	
43	It'll be Alright on the Night S34: Episode 1	11 September 2020	David Walliams	2.62	
44	It'll be Alright on the Night S34: Episode 2	5 December 2020	David Walliams	2.80	
45	It'll be Alright on the Night S34: Episode 3	12 December 2020	David Walliams	2.94	
46	It'll be Alright on the Night at Christmas (also known as It'll be Alright on the Night S34: Episode 4)	19 December 2020	David Walliams	3.02	
47	It'll be Alright on the Night S34: Episode 5	30 April 2021 (Note: This episode was scheduled at short notice, after the last episode of drama Viewpoint - originally planned to air that time - was dropped hours before due to sexual misconduct allegations against actor Noel Clarke.)	David Walliams	<1.79	
48	It'll be Alright on the Night S34: Episode 6	5 June 2021	David Walliams	2.65	
49	It'll be Alright on the Night S35: Episode 1	17 December 2021	David Walliams	—N/a	
50	It'll be Alright on the Night S35: Episode 2	22 April 2022	David Walliams	1.84	
51	It'll be Alright on the Night S35: Episode 3	29 April 2022	David Walliams	1.70	
52	It'll be Alright on the Night S35: Episode 4	6 May 2022	David Walliams	1.71	
53	It'll be Alright on the Night S35: Episode 5	27 May 2022	David Walliams	—N/a	
54	It'll be Alright on the Night S35: Episode 6	2 September 2022	David Walliams	—N/a	
55	It'll be Alright on the Night S36: Episode 1	2 December 2022	David Walliams	2.05	
56	It'll be Alright on the Night S36: Episode 2	24 December 2022	David Walliams	—N/a	
57	It'll be Alright on the Night S36: Episode 3	3 February 2024	David Walliams	2.17	
58	It'll Be Alright on the Night S36: Episode 4	10 May 2024	David Walliams	1.50	
59	It'll Be Alright on the Night S36: Episode 5	17 May 2024	David Walliams	1.24	
60	It'll Be Alright on the Night S36: Episode 6	1 June 2025	David Walliams	—N/a	
61	It'll be Alright on the Night S37: Episode 1, Part 1	25 December 2025	Tom Allen	1.30	
62	It'll Be Alright on the Night S37: Episode 1, Part 2	23 January 2026	Tom Allen	TBA	
63	It'll Be Alright on the Night S37: Episode 2, Part 1	30 January 2026	Tom Allen	TBA	
64	It'll Be Alright on the Night S37: Episode 2, Part 2	6 February 2026	Tom Allen	TBA	
65	It'll Be Alright on the Night S37: Episode 3, Part 1	13 February 2026	Tom Allen	TBA	
66	It'll Be Alright on the Night S37: Episode 3, Part 2	20 February 2026	Tom Allen	TBA	
67	It'll Be Alright on the Night S37: Episode 4, Part 1	27 February 2026	Tom Allen	TBA	
68	It'll Be Alright on the Night S37: Episode 4, Part 2	13 March 2026	Tom Allen	TBA	
69	It'll Be Alright on the Night S37: Episode 5, Part 1	20 March 2026	Tom Allen	TBA	
70	It'll Be Alright on the Night S37: Episode 6, Part 1	10 April 2026	Tom Allen	TBA	
71	It'll Be Alright on the Night S37: Episode 6, Part 2	17 April 2026	Tom Allen	TBA	

== Denis Norden's Laughter File ==
The series also inspired the spin-off programme Denis Norden's Laughter File, which began airing on 22 September 1991 and ran until 13 May 2006. Although it largely followed the same format as its sister programme, while It'll be Alright on the Night focused solely on bloopers/outtakes, Laughter File also screened clips that included pranks and practical jokes. As with It'll be Alright on the Night, later episodes included the words "All New" in their titles to avoid viewer confusion with repeat screenings of earlier episodes.

The theme music used for Denis Norden's Laughter File throughout the whole of its run was a library piece, called "Dress to Kill" by Errol Reid. The programme's producers were Paul Lewis (1991–2002) and Simon Withington (2002–2006).

=== Episodes ===
Episode	Episode name	Original airdate	Viewers (millions)	Ref.
1	Denis Norden's 1st Laughter File	22 September 1991	17.39	
2	Denis Norden's 2nd Laughter File	4 October 1997	—N/a	
3	Denis Norden's 3rd Laughter File	5 December 1998	10.00	
4	Denis Norden's 4th Laughter File	16 October 1999	8.46	
5	Denis Norden's 5th Laughter File	30 September 2000	8.02	
6	Denis Norden's 6th Laughter File	15 October 2001	7.21	
7	Denis Norden's 7th Laughter File	30 March 2002	5.67	
8	Denis Norden's 8th Laughter File	9 November 2002	6.62	
9	Denis Norden's 9th Laughter File	4 October 2003	5.53	
10	Denis Norden's Christmas Laughter File Special	27 December 2003	8.10	
11	Denis Norden's All New 11th Laughter File	26 December 2004	5.73	
12	Denis Norden's All New 12th Laughter File	12 February 2005	5.54	
13	Denis Norden's All New 13th Laughter File	13 May 2006	3.88	
