= Rose-bellied chat =

Conservation status
- Least Concern (IUCN 3.1)

Scientific classification
- Kingdom: Animalia
- Phylum: Chordata
- Class: Aves
- Order: Passeriformes
- Family: Cardinalidae
- Genus: Granatellus
- Species: G. paraensis

Binomial name
- Granatellus paraensis Rothschild, 1904

Synonyms
- Granatellus pelzelni paraensis

Species of bird

The rose-bellied chat (Granatellus paraensis) is a species of bird in the family Cardinalidae. It is endemic to Brazil. It was described by Walter Rothschild in 1906. It is monotypic.

== Taxonomy and systematics ==
This species was formerly considered conspecific with the rose-breasted chat but was separated from it based on consistent differences in plumage, morphology and vocalizations.

This species was formally described by Walter Rothschild in 1906. The holotype was collected on 17 November 1905 by Wilhelm Hoffmanns. The only paratype is a female collected by Hoffmanns on 15 November 1905. Both types were collected from Santo Antonio do Prata, in Pará, Brazil.

== Description ==
This species is a small bird, about 12-12.5 cm in length. Its long tail is frequently cocked and fanned.

The male has a black forecrown, white supercilium, blue-grey upperparts and upperwing, white throat, bright red underparts and a black tail. The female has a blue-grey crown, nape, upperparts and wings, buff-colored forehead, breast and flanks, and pink-colored undertail coverts. The iris is dark colored, the bill is blackish, and the legs are dark grey.

== Vocalizations ==
The song is a series of repeated whistled notes (wheet wheet wheet wheet wheet). The song has typically 6-16 repeated notes and is repeated with intervals of a few seconds. The call is short rhythmic phrase chiwikwi, which lasts for 0.5-1.5 seconds and is repeated many times at intervals of about 1 second.

== Habitat and conservation ==
The general habitat of this species is tropical rainforest and forest edges, often near rivers or lagoons. This species inhabits very low altitudes, up to 850 m. This species is considered Least-concern by the IUCN Red List, however, it may still face threats due to habitat destruction.
