= Chatters =

Chatters is a surname. Notable people with the surname include:

- David Chatters (1946–2016), Canadian politician
- James Chatters (born 1949), American archaeologist and paleontologist

== See also ==
- Chatter (disambiguation)
