= Weird but True! =

American educational television series

- Genre: Educational
- Created by: Charlie Engelman
- Directed by: Brandon Gulish
- Presented by: Charlie Engelman; Kirby Engelman; Carly Ciarrocchi
- Country of origin: United States
- Original language: English
- No. of seasons: 3
- No. of episodes: 43

Production
- Executive producers: Steve Rotfeld; Tracy Rudolph Jackson; Nathan Moore
- Producers: Charlie Engelman; Stephanie Burns
- Running time: 23–26 minutes
- Production companies: National Geographic Kids Entertainment; Steve Rotfeld Productions

Original release
- Network: National Geographic Kids (2016–18); Disney+ (2020)
- Release: September 10, 2016 – November 6, 2020

Weird but True! is an American educational children's television series created by and starring Charlie Engelman with his sister Kirby Engelman (seasons 1–2) and Carly Ciarrocchi (season 3). It originally aired on National Geographic Kids for two seasons, and moved to Disney+ for its third and final season.

Inspired by the National Geographic book series of the same name, much of its style and heavy use of paper models created by the Engelmans are continued from their earlier National Geographic short video series Nature Boom Time.

== Format ==
Using crafting with paper products, the Engelman siblings explore "weird but true" things about a broad-range of subjects, mostly focusing on science. They interview experts and travel to locations such as crime labs, amusement parks, and the Everglades to find answers to their questions and discover weird but true facts, often having their experts share their favorite one. Their other sister Casey appears as a guest star.

Originally, the basement and other scenes set at their house were filmed at Charlie and Kirby's parents' house and basement, in a suburb north of Chicago. For season three, the budget was increased and the basement scenes were filmed at a studio in New Jersey.

The third season was filmed prior to the COVID-19 pandemic. However, several episodes happened to have connections to the experiences children had due to COVID-19, such as the science of germs and how to mitigate the spread of infections, as well as experiencing extreme isolation (although in the context of potentially living on Mars). For the third season, Charlie Engelman said that the art production team was "30 to 40 artists", in addition to their research and television production crew.

== Episodes ==
| Season | Episodes | Originally released | | |
| Season | Episodes | First released | Last released | Network |
|---|---|---|---|---|
| 1 | 17 | September 10, 2016 | September 30, 2017 | National Geographic Kids |
| 2 | 13 | October 7, 2017 | October 6, 2018 | National Geographic Kids |
| 3 | 13 | August 14, 2020 | November 6, 2020 | Disney+ |

=== Season 1 (2016–17) ===
All episodes were written by Charlie Engelman.

| No. overall | No. in season | Title | Original release date |
|---|---|---|---|
| 1 | 1 | "Space Rocks" | September 10, 2016 |
| 2 | 2 | "Storm Chasers" | September 17, 2016 |
| 3 | 3 | "Sunken Treasure" | September 24, 2016 |
| 4 | 4 | "Dog Days" | October 1, 2016 |
| 5 | 5 | "Sharks!" | October 8, 2016 |
| 6 | 6 | "Animal Headgear" | October 15, 2016 |
| 7 | 7 | "Survival 101" | October 22, 2016 |
| 8 | 8 | "Alaska's Animals" | October 29, 2016 |
| 9 | 9 | "Buggin' Out" | November 5, 2016 |
| 10 | 10 | "Animal Invaders" | November 12, 2016 |
| 11 | 11 | "Sense-Abilities" | November 19, 2016 |
| 12 | 12 | "Roller Coasters" | November 26, 2016 |
| 13 | 13 | "Kirby the Falconer" | December 3, 2016 |
| 14 | 14 | "Caves" | September 9, 2017 |
| 15 | 15 | "Action Sports" | September 16, 2017 |
| 16 | 16 | "The Case of the Stolen Bike" | September 23, 2017 |
| 17 | 17 | "Astronauts" | September 30, 2017 |

=== Season 2 (2017–18) ===
All episodes were written by Charlie Engelman.

| No. overall | No. in season | Title | Original release date |
|---|---|---|---|
| 18 | 1 | "Paper Craftalanches & Recycling!" | October 7, 2017 |
| 19 | 2 | "Race Cars" | October 14, 2017 |
| 20 | 3 | "The Airplane Birthday" | October 21, 2017 |
| 21 | 4 | "Sounds Good" | November 25, 2017 |
| 22 | 5 | "Trees! Big & Small" | December 2, 2017 |
| 23 | 6 | "The Volcano Science Fair Showdown" | December 9, 2017 |
| 24 | 7 | "Coral Reef Crazy" | December 16, 2017 |
| 25 | 8 | "Carnivorous Plants!" | December 23, 2017 |
| 26 | 9 | "Busy Bees" | September 1, 2018 |
| 27 | 10 | "The Egg Drop Challenge" | September 8, 2018 |
| 28 | 11 | "It's Electric!" | September 15, 2018 |
| 29 | 12 | "Master Crafters" | September 29, 2018 |
| 30 | 13 | "Animal Defense League" | October 6, 2018 |

=== Season 3 (2020) ===
| No. overall | No. in season | Title | Written by | Original release date |
|---|---|---|---|---|
| 31 | 1 | "Dinosaurs" | Charlie Engelman & Brandon Gulish | August 14, 2020 |
| 32 | 2 | "National Parks" | Charlie Engelman, Mike Foulke & Brandon Gulish | August 21, 2020 |
| 33 | 3 | "Farming" | Charlie Engelman, Michael Foulke & Brandon Gulish | August 28, 2020 |
| 34 | 4 | "Germs" | Charlie Engelman & Brandon Gulish | September 4, 2020 |
| 35 | 5 | "Photography" | Charlie Engelman & Brandon Gulish | September 11, 2020 |
| 36 | 6 | "Trains" | Charlie Engelman, Michael Foulke & Brandon Gulish | September 18, 2020 |
| 37 | 7 | "Venomous Animals" | Charlie Engelman & Brandon Gulish | September 25, 2020 |
| 38 | 8 | "Our Solar System" | Charlie Engelman & Brandon Gulish | October 2, 2020 |
| 39 | 9 | "Cooking" | Charlie Engelman & Brandon Gulish | October 9, 2020 |
| 40 | 10 | "Explorers" | Charlie Engelman & Brandon Gulish | October 16, 2020 |
| 41 | 11 | "Scuba Diving" | Michael Foulke | October 23, 2020 |
| 42 | 12 | "Rockets" | Charlie Engelman & Brandon Gulish | October 30, 2020 |
| 43 | 13 | "Camping" | Charlie Engelman & Brandon Gulish | November 6, 2020 |

== Reception ==
=== Critical response ===
The Washington Post praised the humor of the series and described it as a fun learning experience, saying the show manages to be innovative and informative for its audience, writing that it's a "humorous and informative tween-oriented show" with "a wide range of [science] topics" and "a great pick for tweens and grade school-age kids". Surbhi Gupta of The Indian Express said the series has an "engaging mix of art and craft, unbelievable facts, and real-life explorations" and that the show "has grown with each season in terms of scale". Melissa Camacho of Common Sense Media rated the series 4 out of 5 stars, praised its educational value, saying the series invites its audience to deconstruct familiar topics in order to think about them from a different point of view, and complimented the presence of positive messages and role models, stating the series promotes science and innovative thinking through humor, writing, "It's upbeat and fun, and there's a lot to be learned from it, making it a great pick for tweens and up."

=== Accolades ===
| Year | Award | Category | Recipient(s) | Result | Ref. |
|---|---|---|---|---|---|
| 2017 | Daytime Emmy Award | Outstanding Writing in a Children's, Pre-School Children's or Family Viewing Program | Charlie Engelman | Nominated | |
| 2017 | Daytime Emmy Award | Outstanding Single Camera Editing | Mike Varga (senior editor), Arthur 'Art' Citron (editor), Michael Novak (editor), Jocelyn Rose Tarquini (editor) | Nominated | |
| 2018 | Daytime Emmy Award | Outstanding Sound Editing - Live Action | Mike Varga (supervising sound editor) | Nominated | |
| 2018 | Daytime Emmy Award | Outstanding Special Class Short Format Daytime | James Introcaso (executive producer), Nathan Moore (executive producer). "Weird But True! Shorts". | Nominated | |
| 2019 | Daytime Emmy Award | Outstanding Educational or Informational Series | National Geographic Kids | Won | |
| 2019 | Daytime Emmy Award | Outstanding Directing for a Single Camera Lifestyle, Culinary, Travel or Educational and Informational Program | Brandon Gulish (director), National Geographic Kids | Nominated | |
| 2021 | Daytime Emmy Award | Outstanding Daytime Program Host | Carly Ciarrocchi | Nominated | |
| 2021 | Daytime Emmy Award | Outstanding Daytime Program Host | Charlie Engelman | Nominated | |
| 2021 | Daytime Emmy Award | Outstanding Art Direction/Set Decoration/Scenic Design | National Geographic Kids | Nominated | |
