= Chat room (disambiguation) =

A chat room is part of a website where visitors can converse in typed messages.

Chat room or chatroom may also refer to:

- Chat Room (film), a 2002 American comedy film
- Chat Room (novel), a 2006 novel by Barbara Biggs
- Chat Room (TV program), an American educational television series
- Chatroom (film), a 2010 British thriller drama film
- "Chatroom", a 2026 song by Melanie Martinez
