= Steve Rotfeld Productions =

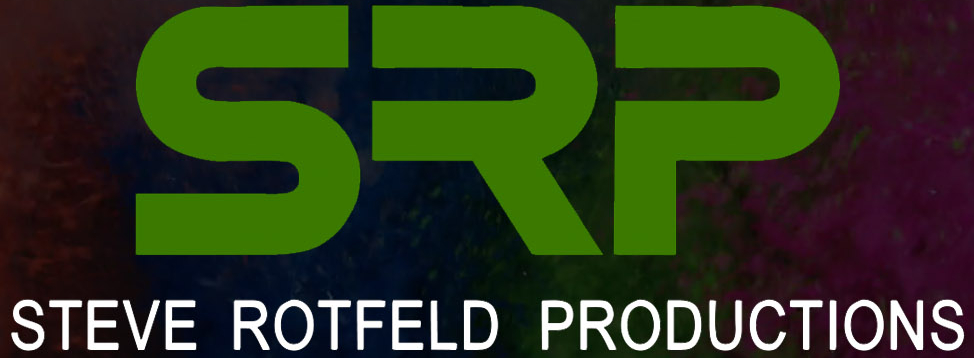
- Founded: 1985; 41 years ago
- Founder: Steve Rotfeld
- Headquarters: Bryn Mawr, Pennsylvania, U.S.
- Key people: Steve Rotfeld (president); Fern Rotfeld (director of syndication)
- Owner: Steve Rotfeld

Steve Rotfeld Productions (SRP) is an America television production, stock footage, and broadcast syndication company based in Bryn Mawr, Pennsylvania, a suburb of Philadelphia. The company was founded in 1985 by president Steve Rotfeld. SRP currently produces six educational/informational (E/I)-compliant series through its syndication division: Wild About Animals, Awesome Adventures, Whaddyado, Chat Room, and Animal Science. Additionally, SRP is currently producing one-hour quarterly specials of its popular sports programs, Greatest Sports Legends and Sports Gone Wild. Since 1985, SRP's programs have appeared in national broadcast syndication and on major cable channels such as TLC, ESPN, Animal Planet, truTV, and the Travel Channel.

== History ==
Steve Rotfeld Productions was started in 1986 by Steve Rotfeld after working for his father for five years on the sports-documentary series Greatest Sports Legends. Initially operating out of the second level of his home, Rotfeld soon teamed with 44 Blue Productions on Bob Uecker’s Wacky World of Sports. With ESPN's The Lighter Side of Sports, his staff outgrew his home. In the mid-1990s, SRP branched out into E/I programming with Wild About Animals, and Awesome Adventures as that genre was left to the smaller producers. In 2008, Steve Rotfeld established The WorkShop with SRP producer Tom Farrell.

In the fall of 2014, SRP began programming a two-hour weekly block for Fox Television Stations under a syndication agreement entitled Xploration Station. With Sinclair Broadcasting Group adding Xploration Station to its station for five years starting in the fall 2016, the block added another hour.

Stephanie Wolf, a former National Geographic Channel executive, was hired as director of development for Rotfeld Production in early January 2015. Wolf then sealed distribution deals with Electus, Sky Vision, and Tricon.

In the summer of 2019, Rotfeld Productions announced three Apollo documentaries for various channels, streaming services and syndicated blocks for the fiftieth anniversary of the Apollo 11 Moon landing.

== Television shows ==
- Wild About Animals (syndicated by Fox-owned & operated stations): Hosted by Mariette Hartley, the series was picked up by Animal Planet for three years.
- Awesome Adventures: Began airing in 1996; takes teens on incredible journeys all over the world to experience a wide range of destinations and diverse activities. Hosted by Nicole Dabeau.
- Whaddyado: Features people in real-life moral dilemmas and perilous situations to give young viewers a chance to ponder what they would do in the same situation.
- Wild Weddings (TLC): Outrageous wedding moments caught on tape.
- The Lighter Side of Sports (ESPN): A sports blooper program that included interviews with sports figures and comedians in front of a live audience.
- Sports Disasters: Accidents involving athletes and spectators.
- Bob Uecker's Wacky World of Sports (syndication): Bob Uecker presents numerous sports bloopers and oddities.
- Chat Room: A young panel discusses teen-oriented issues, gives their opinions, and advises kids on dealing with potential problems.
- Animal Science: Shows viewers how and why animals behave using a scientific approach, with 3D animations, graphics, and analysis.
- Sports Gone Wild: Features bloopers, crazy moments, and incredible plays from the world of sports. In 2012, the classic sports series will air as one-hour specials each quarter.
- Apollo Chronicles (CW July 20, 2019; Roku July 2019): Documentary covering the 12 years from Sputnik to the Moon landing. The film includes FBI documents newly declassified and CIA operations untold stories.
- The Armstrong Tapes (National Geographic U.S.): One-hour documentary special co-production with National Geographic Channel airing on July 8, 2019, using Neil Armstrong's never-before-heard audio interviews of 70 hours.
- Countdown to Apollo (Xploration Station) 2019: 8 episodes of 30 minutes length.

=== Greatest Sports Legends ===
Greatest Sports Legends is a sports anthology series on the lives and careers of noted athletes. First aired on April 1, 1974, the series was produced with 10 new episodes per year nestled amongst 42 reruns. 207 episodes were produced, with athlete hosts including Michael Jordan, Tom Seaver, Paul Hornung, Reggie Jackson, Steve Garvey, Dave Winfield, and Celebrity Hosts George Plimpton, Ken Howard and Jayne Kennedy interviewing the featured athlete. The series won one Emmy award out of three nominations.

After production, the series continued to air in reruns. In 2012, it was announced that Steve Rotfeld Productions would offer one-hour editions. As of 2015, the series airs sporadically on the broadcast digital network Decades.

In 2021 Greatest Sports Legends Then and Now premiered with hosts Wes Hall and Greg Murphy as they compare the legends of yesteryear (featuring clips of them on Greatest Sports Legends) to the stars of most recent times and today.

=== Xploration Station ===
In Fall of 2014, SRP will begin programming a two-hour weekly block for Fox Television Stations under a syndication agreement entitled Xploration Station. With Sinclair Broadcasting Group adding Xploration Station to its station for five years starting in the fall 2016, the block added another hour. Xploration Station has received two Daytime Emmy Awards: Xploration Earth 2050 won in the category of Outstanding Special Class Series in 2018, and Weird But True!, a co-production with National Geographic Kids, won in the category of Outstanding Educational Informational Series in 2019.

== The WorkShop ==
In 2008, Steve Rotfeld established The WorkShop with SRP producer Tom Farrell. The full-service media production company currently produces the Golf Channel's The Haney Project, and Independence USA on GBTV, Glenn Beck's live streaming video network.

Past WorkShop series include Donald J. Trump's Fabulous World of Golf and Golf in America.

- Independence USA (GBTV): A reality series that follows Frank Belcastro and his family as they prepare to live life "off the grid" in the event of a potential catastrophe. The series premiered on GBTV, Glenn Beck's live-streaming video network, January 18, 2012.
- The Haney Project: Features Hank Haney (Tiger Woods's former swing coach) teaching a celebrity how to become a better golfer. The show has featured basketball player Charles Barkley; actor/comedian Ray Romano; and radio talk show host Rush Limbaugh. The fourth season of The Haney Project featured four celebrities: Adam Levine (Maroon 5 and The Voice), boxer Sugar Ray Leonard, chef Mario Batali, and former model Angie Everhart, competing against each other for the chance to win over $100,000 for the charity of their choice.
- Nuremberg: The Lost Testimony: A documentary by SRP and National Geographic about the Nuremberg Trials for Nazi Germany after the Second World War.
