= Blooper =

Short film or video clip containing a mistake

Bloopers from the filming of The Summer I Turned Pretty

A blooper, or gag reel, is a short clip from a film, television program or video production, usually a deleted scene, which includes a mistake made by a member of the cast or crew. It also refers to an error made during a live radio or TV broadcast or news report, usually in terms of misspoken words or technical errors.

The English language word comes from the early days of radio, from around 1926. Used in baseball by 1940, it meant "hit a ball in a high arc over the head of a fielder". It has been used as a noun from 1931.

The term blooper was popularized in the 1950s and 1960s in a series of record albums produced by Kermit Schafer entitled Pardon My Blooper, in which the definition of a blooper is thus given by the record series' narrator: "Unintended indiscretions before microphone and camera."

Bloopers are often the subject of television programs and may be shown during the closing credits of comedic films or TV episodes. Prominent examples of films with bloopers include The Cannonball Run, Cheaper by the Dozen, and Rush Hour. Jackie Chan and Burt Reynolds are both famous for including such reels with the closing credits of their movies.

In recent years, many animated films have also incorporated bloopers, including a mix of faked bloopers, genuine voice-actor mistakes set to animation, and technical errors. Examples can be found in Pixar films A Bug's Life (1998), Toy Story 2 (1999), and Monsters, Inc. (2001). Humorous mistakes made by athletes are often referred to as bloopers as well, particularly in baseball. The more provocative term "choke" may be used to describe such plays instead, especially if a blooper affects the outcome of a sports competition in a major way, such as a late-game event in a close game. This is especially true if the game was an important one in the outcome of a season such as a playoff game or championship event.

== Origins ==
=== United States ===
The term "blooper" was popularized in the United States by television producer Kermit Schaefer in the 1950s; the terms "boner" (meaning a boneheaded mistake) and "breakdown" had been in common usage previously. Schaefer produced a long-running series of Pardon My Blooper! record albums in the 1950s and 1960s which featured a mixture of actual recordings of errors from television and radio broadcasts and re-creations. Schaefer also transcribed many reported bloopers into a series of books that he published up until he died in 1979.

Schaefer was by no means the first to undertake serious study and collection of broadcast errata; NBC's short-lived "behind-the-scenes" series Behind the Mike (1940–42) occasionally featured reconstructions of announcers' gaffes and flubs as part of the "Oddities in Radio" segment, and movie studios such as Warner Bros. had been producing so-called "gag reels" of outtakes (usually for employee-only viewing) since the 1930s. As recently as 2003, the Warner Bros. Studio Tour included a screening of bloopers from classic films as part of the tour.

=== United Kingdom ===
Jonathan Hewat (1938–2014), who had a vast personal collection of taped broadcasting gaffes, was the first person in the UK to broadcast radio bloopers, on a bank holiday show on BBC Radio Bristol at the end of the 1980s.

He subsequently produced and presented a half-hour show on that station called So You Want to Run a Radio Station?. This was nominated for a Sony Award. The transmission of humorous mistakes, previously considered private material only for the ears of industry insiders, came to the attention of BBC Radio 2. They commissioned a series of six fifteen-minute programmes called Can I Take That Again?, produced by Jonathan James Moore (then Head of BBC Light Entertainment, Radio). The success of this series led to a further five series on Radio 2 (the programme ran from 1985 to 1990), as well as a small number of programmes (called Bloopers) on BBC Radio 4.

Some of the earliest clips in Hewat's collection went back to Rudy Vallee "corpsing" (giggling uncontrollably) during a recording of "There Is a Tavern in the Town" and one of the very earliest OBs (Outside Broadcasts) of The Illumination of the Fleet.

The comment made by newsreaders after making a mistake "I'm sorry I'll read that again" was the origin of the title of the radio show which ran on the BBC during the 1960s and 1970s.

== Television shows ==
Comedian Dick Emery showcased his own outtakes as an epilogue entitled "A Comedy of Errors" to his BBC shows in the mid-1970s. The later ITV show It'll Be Alright on the Night (originally hosted by Denis Norden) showed outtakes from film and TV. The BBC's answer to the show, Auntie's Bloomers and its spin-off, Auntie's Sporting Bloomers, ran until 2001. It was replaced by Outtake TV, which began as a series of one-off specials in 2002, hosted by Paul O'Grady, before a series was commissioned for BBC One in 2004, hosted by Anne Robinson. Special Weakest Link-themed editions were common during Robinson's tenure, which lasted until 2009. Rufus Hound took over in 2010. Outtake TV now appears as occasional one-off specials, much in the same way as It'll Be Alright on the Night.

ITV has produced two other shows, TV Nightmares and TV's Naughtiest Blunders. Both were presented by Steve Penk, before the latter show changed to show continuous clips with voice-over by Neil Morrissey. Nightmares presented TV personalities relating some of their most hair-raising moments, and Naughtiest Blunders presented more risqué mistakes. The latter has also been criticised for being used as a simple schedule filler, often with ridiculously titled editions (e.g. All New TV's Naughtiest Blunders 18).

During the 1982–83 season, TV producer Dick Clark revived the bloopers concept in America for a series of specials on NBC called TV's Censored Bloopers. This led to a weekly series which ran from 1984 through 1992 (co-hosted by Clark and Ed McMahon) and was followed by more specials that appeared on ABC irregularly until 2004, still hosted by Clark. These specials and a record album of radio bloopers produced by Clark in the mid-1980s were dedicated to the memory of Kermit Schaefer.

After Clark suffered a stroke, the blooper shows went on hiatus until 2007, when John O'Hurley hosted a special for ABC that was packaged by Dick Clark Productions.

The success of both Clark's and Norden's efforts led to imitators on virtually all American and Australian TV networks, as well as scores of home video releases; many American productions are aired to fill gaps in prime time schedules. The ABC Network aired Foul-Ups, Bleeps & Blunders hosted by Steve Lawrence and Don Rickles in direct competition with the Clark TV series. With the coming of DVD in the 1990s, it became common for major film releases to include a "blooper reel" (also known as a "gag reel" or simply "outtakes") as bonus material on the disc.

In 1985, Steve Rotfeld began compiling stock footage of various sports-related errors and mistakes and compiled them into a program known as Bob Uecker's Wacky World of Sports. In the early 1990s, that series eventually evolved into The Lighter Side of Sports and continued in limited production through the early 2000s.

NFL Films, the official production arm of the National Football League, has produced a line of blooper reels known as the Football Follies for both television and direct-to-video consumption since 1968.

== Causes ==
Bloopers are usually accidental and humorous. Where actors need to memorize large numbers of lines or perform a series of actions in quick succession, mistakes can be expected. Similarly, newsreaders have only a short time to deliver a large amount of information and are prone to mispronounce place names and people's names, or switch a name or word without realizing it, as in a slip-of-the-tongue or Freudian slip.

Some common examples include:

- Uncontrollable laughter (called, in television and acting circles, corpsing)
- Unanticipated incidents (e.g. a prop falling or breaking, or a child/animal failing to behave as expected)
- Forgotten lines
- Deliberate sabotage of an actor's performance by a fellow actor; a prank or practical joke (to evoke laughter from cast and crew).

The famous old chestnut of show business "Never work with children or animals" demonstrates two other causes of out-takes: Children, especially those who have no acting experience, often miss cues, deliver the wrong lines or make comments which are particularly embarrassing. (The Kids Say the Darndest Things series, conceived by Art Linkletter, deliberately sought these kinds of remarks.) Similarly, animals are very likely to do things not in the script, generally involving bodily functions.

A third type of blooper is caused by failure of inanimate objects. This can be as simple as a sound effect being mistimed or a microphone not working properly, but frequently involves doorknobs (and doors) not working or breaking, props and sets being improperly prepared, as well as props working in ways they should not work.

In recent years, mobile phones have been a new source of bloopers with them frequently going off. Many of them belong to actors, presenters, and contestants who may have forgotten to turn them off or put them in silent mode. The effect is especially pronounced when the film setting is before the modern era (e.g., ancient Greece or Rome). However, this blooper is rarely seen in recent films (most productions enforce "no cellphone" rules while on-set to reduce the risk of plot or production details being leaked) but is commonly used in fake bloopers for animations.

The reaction to bloopers is often intensified in the stressful environment of a movie or television set, with some actors expressing extreme annoyance while others enjoy the stress relief brought on by the unexpected event.

== Examples ==
One of the earliest known bloopers is attributed to 1930s radio broadcaster Harry Von Zell, who accidentally referred to then-US President Herbert Hoover as "Hoobert Heever" during an introduction. Reportedly it was upon hearing of this mistake that Kermit Schafer was inspired to begin collecting bloopers, although the exact circumstances of the event have been debated. A similar situation occurred decades later when then-new president Gerald Ford was introduced as "Gerald Smith", the same name as an American Fascist leader from the 1930s.

On an episode of The Red Skelton Show in the 1950s, a skit involving Red's "country bumpkin" character "Clem Kadiddlehopper" had him leading a cow onto the stage. Several seconds into the skit, the cow defecated on-stage during the live broadcast. Whereupon the audience laughed uncontrollably, and Skelton resorted to the use of the ad-lib, saying "Boy, she's a great cow! Not only does she give milk, {pause} she gives Pet-Ritz Pies!" (Laughs for about ten seconds, then says some things to the cow by her ear). He followed up with, "Why didn't you think of that earlier?", "On top of that, you have a bad breath, you know that?" and finally, "Well sir, it's like they say in psychiatry. Get it out of your system." Then the network cut to a commercial.

A much-bootlegged recording of Bing Crosby has him singing to a recording of a band playing "Wrap Your Troubles In Dreams", when he realizes that the master tape had not been fully rewound, and ad-libbed vocals to the truncated music. He begins, "Castles may tumble, that's fate after all/ Life's really funny that way." Realizing the shortened music, he ad-libs, "Sang the wrong melody, we'll play it back/ See what it sounds like, hey hey/ They cut out eight bars, the dirty bastards/ And I didn't know which eight bars he was gonna cut/ Why don't somebody tell me these things around here/ Holy Christ, I'm going off my nut". Part of this recording was made available to the public by Kermit Schaefer in his Blunderful World Of Bloopers record set.

On the Wild Bill Hickok radio series in the early 1950s, a newsflash caused an unexpected blooper when it broke into the show. With sound effects providing the sound of horses' hoofs galloping and guns firing, Guy Madison spoke the line "He's hidden through the pass, come on Jingles!" Whereupon an announcer interrupted with, "We interrupt this program to bring you a bulletin from the Mutual newsroom. According to an announcement from Moscow radio, Lavrenti Beria has just been executed! We now return you to Wild Bill Hickok." At this point, Andy Devine (as Jingles) was delivering the line "Woah that'll hold him for a little while Bill!"

In a similar vein, New York children's radio show host "Uncle Don" Carney supposedly delivered the ad-libbed line "Are we off? Good...well, that oughta hold the little bastards" after signing off on his show one night, thinking his studio microphone was switched off. As a discredited urban legend has it, the remarks went to air, eventually leading to the show's cancellation and "Uncle Don"'s disgrace; apparently, Carney himself would tell the story of his blooper, especially once it became popular after the release of Schaefer's records. However, according to the debunking website Snopes.com, not only did the alleged incident never happen, the much-distributed recording of the incident was a fabrication. (The alleged incident was even parodied in the 1993 Simpsons episode "Krusty Gets Kancelled".)

An episode of the radio drama Mr. Keen, Tracer of Lost Persons was presumably introduced as "Mr. Keen, Loser of Traced Persons." (Bob and Ray once did their own parody of this program under the title "Mr. Trace, Keener Than Most Persons".)

A popular story among Texas broadcasting circles has it that a station manager's late change in programming from Les Brown's orchestra to a religious programme marking the somber Jewish holiday of Yom Kippur led to the staff announcer's billboard urging his listeners to "Stay tuned for the dance music of Yom Kippur's Orchestra." (Many gentile DJs have urged their Jewish listeners to "Have a happy Yom Kippur!")

A radio commercial for A&P food stores ended with the announcer excitedly blurting out "...and be sure to visit your nearby A & Food P Store!" In much the same vein was an ad for instant tea as came out in the end "Instant White Rose, hot or cold – Orange Tekoe Pee" and a bakery advertising itself as having "the breast bed and rolls you ever tasted; I knew that would happen one night, friends," all the while breaking out in fits of uncontrollable laughter trying to get the line right.

During the Davy Crockett mania of the mid-1950s, a radio ad for children's bedding cashing in on the same had the line "...with scenes of Davy Crockett in action on the mattress," a clear example of how unintentional double-entendre can translate into blooper material.

Afrikaans news anchor Riaan Cruywagen made several live-bloopers during his long career, most notably: where the normally very composed and highly professional Cruywagen burst into uncontrollable laughter while covering story about a record-breaking frog; as well as when co-anchor Marïetta Kruger asked what the word "dysentery" meant while covering a story related to the topic, to which he responded with "spuitpoep" (it translated as "spray poo"), which resulted in Kruger going into a fit of uncontrollable laughter.

A public service announcement urging young women to volunteer as nurses during a critical shortage thereof ended with the appeal "Volunteer to be one of America's white-clapped angels of mercy," confusing a slang term for infection with gonorrhea with "white-clad."

The announcer of a radio ad for the 1948 Bob Hope film The Paleface, which costarred buxom actress Jane Russell, enthusiastically promised: "Bob Hope, America's favorite comedian, and Jane Russell...what a pair!"

A Canadian Broadcasting Corporation radio announcer's station-identification message once allegedly came out "This is the Dominion Network of the Canadian Broadcorping Castration," in turn coining an oft-used sarcastic term for the public broadcaster. Like other blooper recordings distributed by Schaefer, a recreation was created as the original recording was not preserved, leading to debate over whether the event actually happened.

A radio adaptation of Don Quixote over the BBC had one episode ending with the announcer explaining where "I'm afraid we've run out of time, so here we leave Don Quixote, sitting on his ass until tomorrow at the same time." In US English, ass could refer either to the buttocks or to a jackass. However, this would not have been seen as a blooper in the UK in the period when it was transmitted, since the British slang word for buttocks is arse, pronounced quite differently. It is only since it has become permissible for ass in the sense of buttocks to be used in US films and on television, and syndicated to the UK, that most Brits have become aware of the buttocks usage. Indeed, since the King James Bible translation is now rarely used, and since the word jackass is very rare in the UK, much of British youth is now unaware that ass can mean donkey. As with the word gay, its usage has completely changed within a few years. The announcer was merely making a joke of the character being frozen in place for 24 hours waiting for us, rather like Elwood in the opening minutes of Blues Brothers 2000, or like toys put back in the cupboard in several children's films.

=== Contemporary examples ===
The American sitcom The Fresh Prince of Bel-Air had a tradition of airing outtakes over the closing credits, though blooper reels were not shown during the closing credits of the show during the first, fifth (except for one episode), and sixth seasons. Many of these involved malapropisms on the part of the cast, often lampooned by Will Smith, who would chime in on the mistakes made by the rest of the cast. An example of this is when Uncle Phil (James Avery) comments, "Well, the silverware's obviously not in the house. It must been stolen", before realizing the line was "It must have been stolen" and correcting himself. Smith appears in the shot and, in an exaggerated accent, responds, "It must been stolen. Feet, don't fail me now!"

Another sitcom, Home Improvement, also showcased outtakes over its closing credits; however, some episodes featured a tag scene over the credits in lieu of a blooper reel.

Star Trek produced many famous outtakes, which were shown to the delight of fans at gatherings over the years and have been extensively bootlegged. One famous example shows actor Leonard Nimoy, who plays the supposedly emotionless Mr. Spock, breaking into laughter when, in the first-season episode "This Side of Paradise", instead of saying the line "The plants act as a repository", says "The plants act as a suppository". In another outtake, series star William Shatner breaks character during a scene and starts complaining about the food served in the studio commissary. A third example begins with the third-season episode "Is There in Truth No Beauty?", in which guest actress Diana Muldaur recited the line, "We've come to the end of an eventful... trip", to which Shatner replies, "I don't know what you've been taking..." – a reference to the then-topical issue of drug-induced hallucinations or "trips". People bumping into supposedly automatic doors when the backstage personnel mistimed opening them was a common accident depicted. Similarly there were also mishaps while filming outdoors, with aircraft flying over supposedly alien planets.

Hee Haw often showed bloopers in the show itself, usually with the actor or actors requiring several tries to get a line right, ending in most cases with the correctly delivered line.

Many theatrical motion pictures feature bloopers during the end credits. For example, many Jackie Chan movies end with footage of failed stunts, blown dialogue, and other mishaps; Chan was inspired to do this by Burt Reynolds' films of the early 1980s (in particular Smokey and the Bandit II and The Cannonball Run) that also featured end-credits bloopers. As an homage to its inspiration, the closing-credits blooper reel for Anchorman: The Legend of Ron Burgundy actually featured one outtake from Smokey and the Bandit II.

Pixar also has a tradition of including blooper-like material during the end credits of such films as A Bug's Life, Toy Story 2, and Monsters, Inc.; the latter was at one point reissued to theatres with a major selling feature being the addition of extra "bloopers". Since Pixar's films are painstakingly animated, making actual blunders of this sort is impossible; these scenes are in fact staged to provide additional audience enjoyment. The makers of another animated film, Final Fantasy: The Spirits Within, likewise also created a faux blooper reel showing the characters playing practical jokes and, in one case, bursting into laughter when one "sneezes" during a dramatic sequence. However, the movie Shrek has actual bloopers that were released on DVD. These bloopers are technical errors within the system, causing blurred characters or the characters' bodies going through objects, such as a bush or the crown Lord Farquaad wears. Going back decades earlier, in 1939 Warner Bros. cartoon director Bob Clampett produced a short "blooper" film (for the studio's annual in-house gag reel) of Looney Tunes character Porky Pig smashing his thumb with a hammer and cursing.

The television show, Full House, had various bloopers in television specials but unreleased bloopers were leaked containing cast members using profanity to express their mistakes in a family-friendly program.

The fishing television series Bill Dance Outdoors has produced four videos (two VHS and two DVD) focusing entirely on bloopers occurring during production of the show and associated commercials, often showing various mishaps such as missed lines (which sometimes take several takes to finally deliver correctly), accidents during filming (including falling into the water, being impaled with a fish hook, or equipment malfunctions), as well as practical jokes played on the host by his guests and film crew (and vice versa). Some of the outtakes shown on these videos would sometimes be shown over the end credits.

The Discovery Channel series MythBusters will often keep some bloopers included in the actual episodes, usually various mishaps that occur on the show, such as minor injuries suffered by the cast, or various other accidents and malfunctions, which are usually quite spectacular and/or embarrassing when they do occur.

In Asia, variety shows, which is broadcast in a live-like format, would sometimes air bloopers titled NG's, which stands for no good/not good. These NG's would usually feature hosts forgetting their words by mistake and admitting they make mistakes on occasion.

The Disney Channel Original Series Sonny with a Chance season 1 episode "Sonny So Far" included bloopers where actress Demi Lovato had uncontrollable laughter while suffering from hiccups during a supposedly "serious" scene, and several other scenes where the cast-members either humorously messed-up their lines, or props were forgotten.

A recent example of a well-publicized live blooper occurred during the March 2, 2014 telecast of the 86th Academy Awards. In introducing the singer Idina Menzel's performance of one of the Best Song nominees, actor John Travolta accidentally announced her as "Adele Dazeem".

== Acceptance of out-takes ==
The proliferation of out-takes/gag reels/blooper reels, especially on recent DVD releases, has received mixed responses from actors and directors. While many do not mind the extra publicity offered by such material being shown to the public and others simply enjoy seeing the mistakes, other actors complain that out-takes are demeaning to themselves and/or the craft and refuse to allow them to be made public.

Director Hal Ashby's decision to include a blooper reel of star Peter Sellers in his 1979 film Being There, for example, is sometimes blamed for Sellers' failure to win that year's Academy Award for Best Actor (for which he was nominated). Sellers had reportedly urged Ashby not to include the outtakes in the final edit of the film, to no avail.

Among his other issues with Star Trek's producer Gene Roddenberry, Leonard Nimoy was not happy that Roddenberry showed the show's blooper reels to fans at conventions in the early 1970s. He felt actors needed to be free to make mistakes without expecting that they would be shown to the public, and wrote a letter to Roddenberry asking him to stop. Roddenberry's answer was to send Nimoy a blooper reel of his own should he have wished to show it at conventions.

Conversely, actors and crew on many productions treat the creation of gag reels as part of the filmmaking process, with innumerable examples of commercially released outtakes in which an actor can be heard remarking that a failed take was likely destined for a gag or blooper reel. Film producer Sam Raimi went so far as to commission veteran composer Vic Mizzy to create unique scores for the gag/blooper reel special features for the DVD releases of the films Spider-Man 2 and Spider-Man 3.

Comedian Greg Giraldo flubbed a joke about sex with koalas during a performance of his Comedy Central special Midlife Vices. Giraldo then made several self-deprecating jokes, suggesting the flub would be included with the "DVD extras", before repeating the joke correctly. The entire bit made the final cut.

== Alternative definitions ==
The term "blooper" or "flub" is often applied to describe continuity errors and other mistakes that have escaped the notice of film editors and directors and have made it into a final, televised or released product, where these errors are subsequently identified by viewers. For example, in a film taking place in the Old West, a viewer might spot a twentieth-century vehicle driving in the distance of one shot, or in a film taking place in ancient Greece, an actor may have forgotten to remove his wristwatch and it was caught on film. Or it might be a piece of clothing, such as shoes, that change for one shot then change back with no explanation. Strictly speaking, however, these are film errors, and not "bloopers" since they did not occur in outtake footage or a live broadcast. The Internet Movie Database website uses the term goofs instead. In the mid-1990s, author Phil Farrand published a series of Nit-Picker's Guides books in which he collected continuity errors and other on-screen "bloopers" from various Star Trek series that had been identified by either himself or fans; the listing of such information is commonplace on wiki-style websites devoted to TV and film production.

In baseball, the term is used to describe a Texas Leaguer, or a short fly ball that lands just past the infield, eluding both infielders and outfielders alike.

The Vietnam-era M79 grenade launcher also has the nickname "Blooper" due to its distinctive firing noise. Gustav Hasford refers to this in his novel, The Phantom Blooper: A Novel of Vietnam (1990).

== See also ==
- B-roll
- Breaking character
- Outtake
- Short film
