= Barbara Biggs =

Australian writer

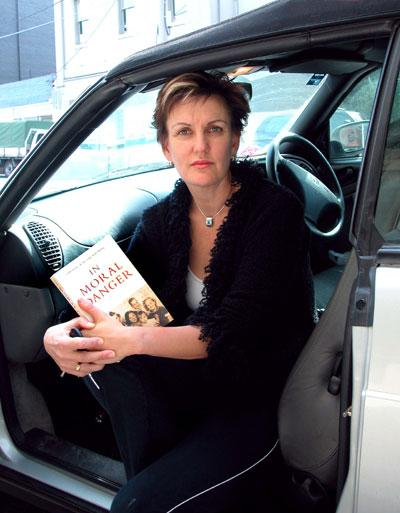
- Born: 3 December 1956 (age 69)
- Citizenship: Australian

Barbara Biggs (born 3 December 1956) is an Australian journalist, social commentator, author, and child protection campaigner.

== Career ==
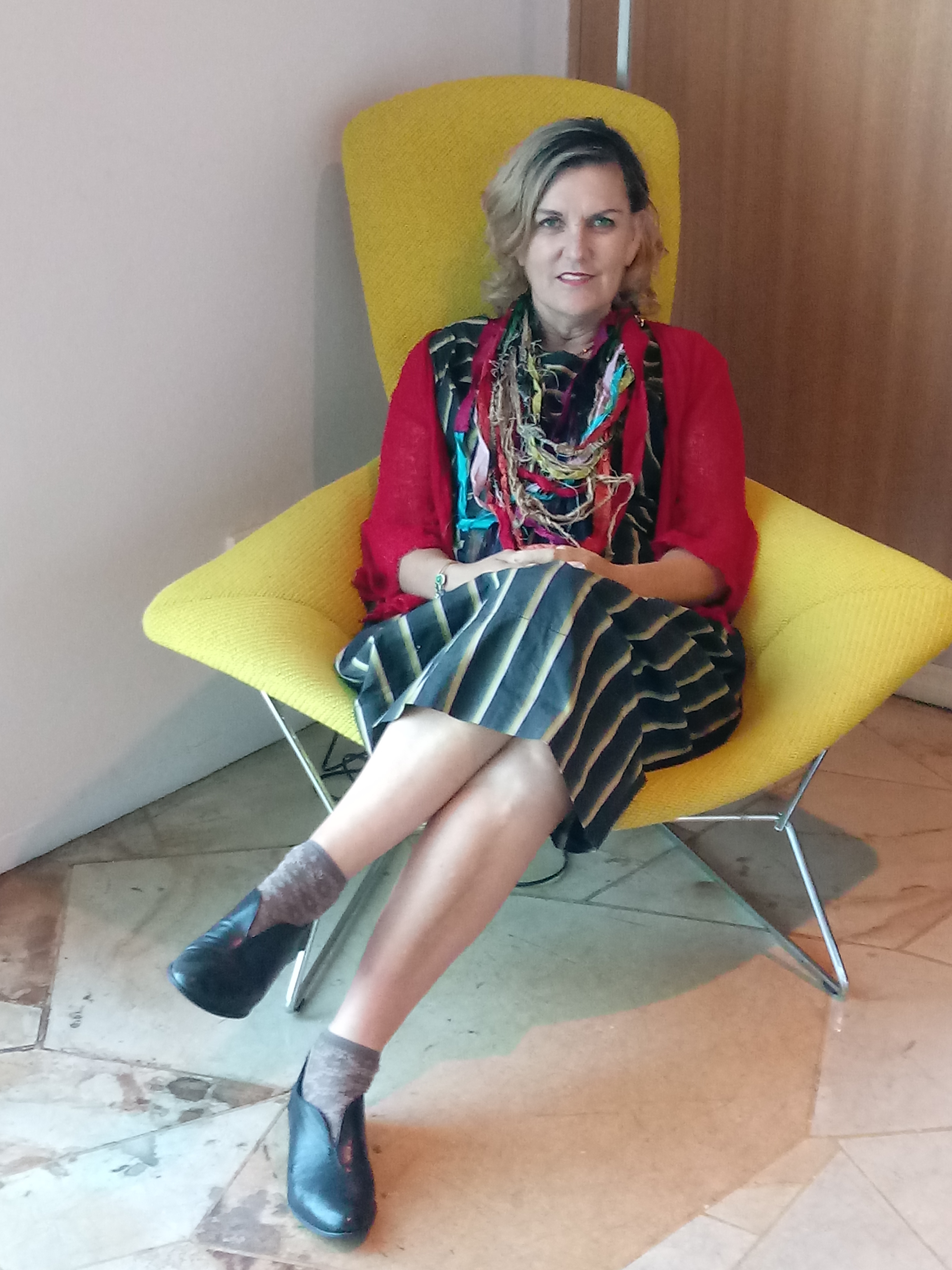

Biggs embarked on her journalism career in 1989, serving as a staff journalist for the Sunday Herald Sun during the 1990s. Since then, she has contributed freelance opinion pieces to renowned publications such as Australia's Herald Sun and Britain's The Independent newspapers.

Biggs' first book was a 2003 autobiography, called In Moral Danger, about her life up to the age of 22. The book bravely recounts her traumatic experience of sexual abuse starting at the age of 14 by a prominent criminal barrister. It explains the damaging after effects following her abuse, including time spent in a psychiatric hospital, escaping Cambodia weeks before it fell to the Khmer Rouge and being a prostitute in Japan. It also describes how she attempted suicide four times, received death threats and caused national headlines – all before the age of 22.

Biggs has been interviewed about her story written in In Moral Danger by some of Australia and Britain's leading journalists, interviewers and publications including Scotland on Sunday, BBC4's Woman's Hour's Jenni Murray, Australia's Robyn Williams, Phillip Adams, and George Negus.

In Moral Danger has since been released in the UK (2004) and New Zealand (2005) and it has been translated into Japanese, Greek and Swedish, so far.

The 2004 sequel, The Road Home, is about her life from 22 to 42, culminating in a legal battle with the barrister who abused her at 14, which she won. The barrister died three months after the judgement. It also tells how she became a mother, classical pianist, journalist and property millionaire. Former Governor General of Australia Peter Hollingworth wrote a foreword to the book. Two years earlier he had made comments about child sexual abuse and mishandled certain complaints made to him during his career as an Anglican priest. After reading In Moral Danger he felt enlightened by Biggs. In his words, "I accepted Barbara's point that I did not understand the 'emotional mechanics' of child sexual abuse and the long-term destructive effect on a victim's later life." He added "Her story will be an inspiration to others facing similar circumstances. Victims will see that they are not alone and will be encouraged to speak out about their own emotional responses to abuse."

Biggs' third book in 2005, The Accidental Renovator: A Paris Story is about her exploits in buying an apartment in Paris in 2003. A combination of travel book, gonzo-journalistic treatment of the seedier side of Paris life and 'gallery of characters' met whilst renovating the apartment in 2004.

Biggs' fourth book was titled Chat Room and released in 2006. It is about a 13-year-old girl who falls victim to a predator (posing as a child) in a teen chat room. Some of the inside information of this novel was provided by the Australian Federal Police and their files on offenders. It was also released in New Zealand in October 2006.

Sex And Money: How To Get More was Biggs' fifth book, and treats of her own lessons on how to get more wealth, power, sex, and happiness.

== Child protection campaign ==
After In Moral Danger was published, Biggs became an advocate for social change and awareness about child sexual abuse. She went on the speaking circuit about her life and child sexual abuse, including speaking to a range of welfare professionals and private groups.

Biggs spoke about how she 'fell in love' with her abuser, suppressing her real feelings about the abuse to mould it into a 'love story'. She said this was the most damaging aspect of her abuse, the effects of which lingered for decades.

In February 2009, Biggs began the Safer Family Law Campaign, and convened the National Council for Children Post-Separation (NCCPS), organisations created to seek new provisions to the Family Law Act that the group believed would remove barriers that might prevent women from raising allegations of family violence. Biggs organized a campaign which included an online petition and a series of YouTube videos. Amidst the campaign, Family Court Chief Justice Diana Bryant said some changes were needed, but was critical of the group during a speech; on 2 May, Bryant decided to intervene by requesting that Attorney General Robert McClelland give "urgent consideration" to repealing parts of the Family Law Act. Rallies, organised by Biggs in favour of the changes, took place in five Australian cities on 3 May 2009. Laws which put a child's right to a meaningful relationship with both parents and safety as equal priorities for family court judges, were changed in 2011 to prioritize a child's safety. NCCPS continued to seek further changes to the Family Law Act and other Australian court practice that the group believes will benefit children and families. Six months after she began the campaign, Biggs left the organisation to parents affected by the laws to work in a remote Aboriginal community in the area of mental health and healing.

== Political candidacy ==
Biggs stood as an Upper House candidate for the then new People Power political party, in the 2006 Victorian election. Running for the Northern Metropolitan Region seat, she lost to the Greens candidate Greg Barber.

== Company director/inventor ==
Biggs founded Iaso Trading Pty Ltd in 2009, the same year she invented and patented a bed bug device The device and its worldwide patents was licensed to a large American bedding manufacturer, Protect-a-Bed.

== Legal issues ==
In 1977, Biggs was deported from Japan and on her return journey to Australia was intercepted at Tullamarine after authorities in Guam discovered she possessed two Australian passports in different names. In October 1978, Biggs pleaded guilty in Melbourne Magistrates' Court to "making a false statement when applying for an Australian passport, forging an application for a passport and uttering an application knowing it to be false". Biggs was fined $170 as a result of the charges, and ordered to pay $45 in costs.

In September 1978, Biggs refused to join the Australian Tramway and Motor Omnibus Employees' Association trade union while working as a tram conductor in Melbourne. Public transport service was disrupted as unionized workers on the city's trams and buses refused to work, in support of the closed shop. As a result of the dispute, Biggs received death threats and the strike threatened to become nationwide. After weeks Biggs elected to take on a clerical role with the Transport Ministry, ending the industrial action.

In 2011, Tony Abrahams brought a case in the Federal Court of Australia against Barbara Biggs and her company, alleging misuse of confidential information and misleading conduct under the Trade Practices Act. The case centred around the use of Teflon in bed bug prevention products. While the court dismissed the breach of confidence claim, it found that certain claims made on Biggs’ product website were misleading or false. However, due to a procedural issue—specifically, that the claim was made in Abrahams’ personal name rather than his company's—no damages were awarded. The legal error was later acknowledged by Abrahams’ lawyer, who waived outstanding legal fees in compensation. Biggs retained the rights to her patent.
