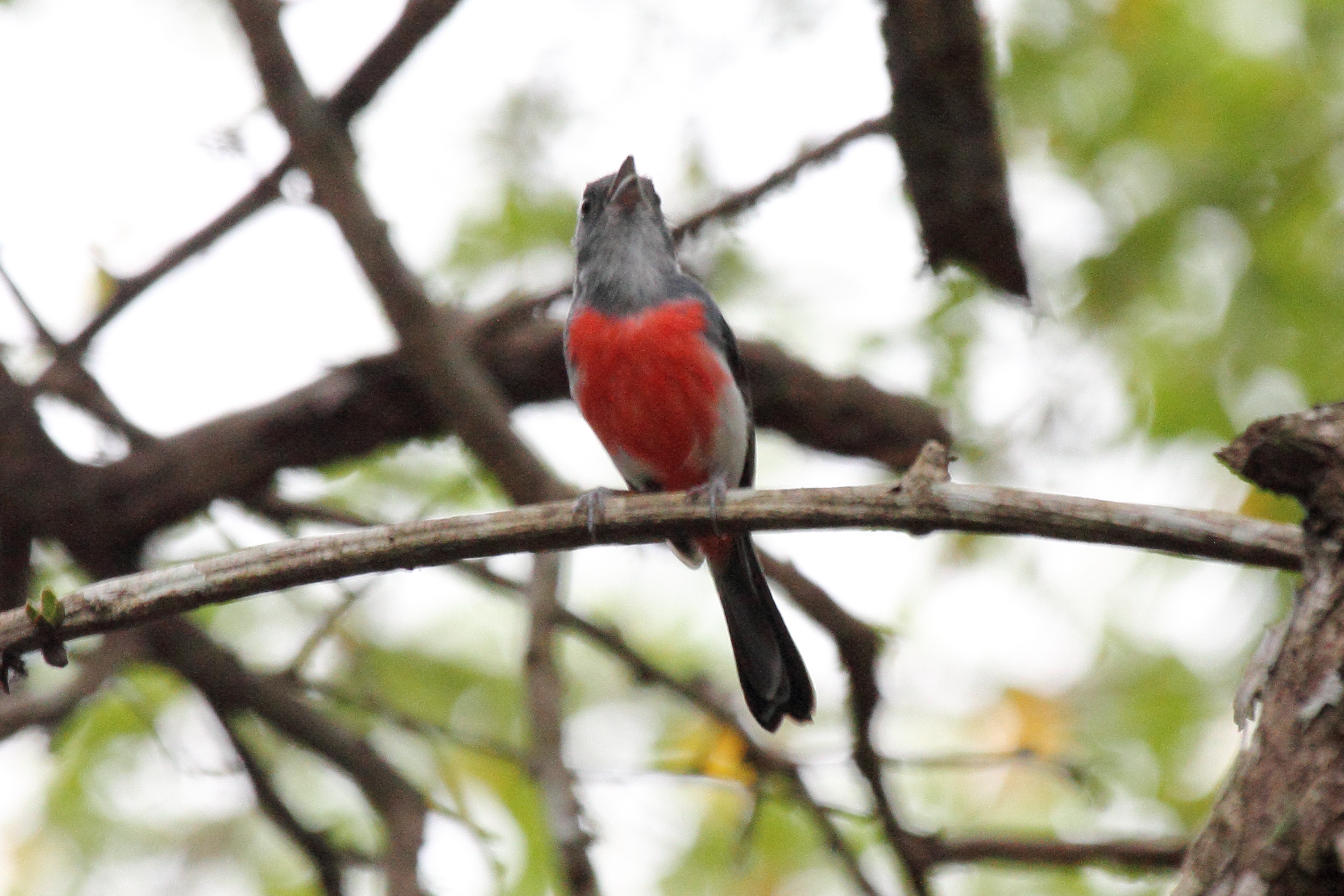

Conservation status
- Least Concern (IUCN 3.1)

Scientific classification
- Kingdom: Animalia
- Phylum: Chordata
- Class: Aves
- Order: Passeriformes
- Family: Cardinalidae
- Genus: Granatellus
- Species: G. sallaei

Binomial name
- Granatellus sallaei (Bonaparte, 1856)

= Grey-throated chat =

Species of bird

The grey-throated chat (Granatellus sallaei) is a species of bird in the family Cardinalidae, the cardinals or cardinal grosbeaks. It is found in Belize, Guatemala, and Mexico.

== Taxonomy and systematics ==
The genus Granatellus was traditionally placed in family Parulidae, the New World warblers. Studies of DNA sequences in the early 2000s resulted in its being moved to its present family. The grey-throated chat and the other two members of its genus, red-breasted chat (G. venustus) and rose-breasted chat (G. pelzelni) form a superspecies.

The grey-throated chat has two subspecies, the nominate Granatellus sallaei sallaei and G. s. boucardi.

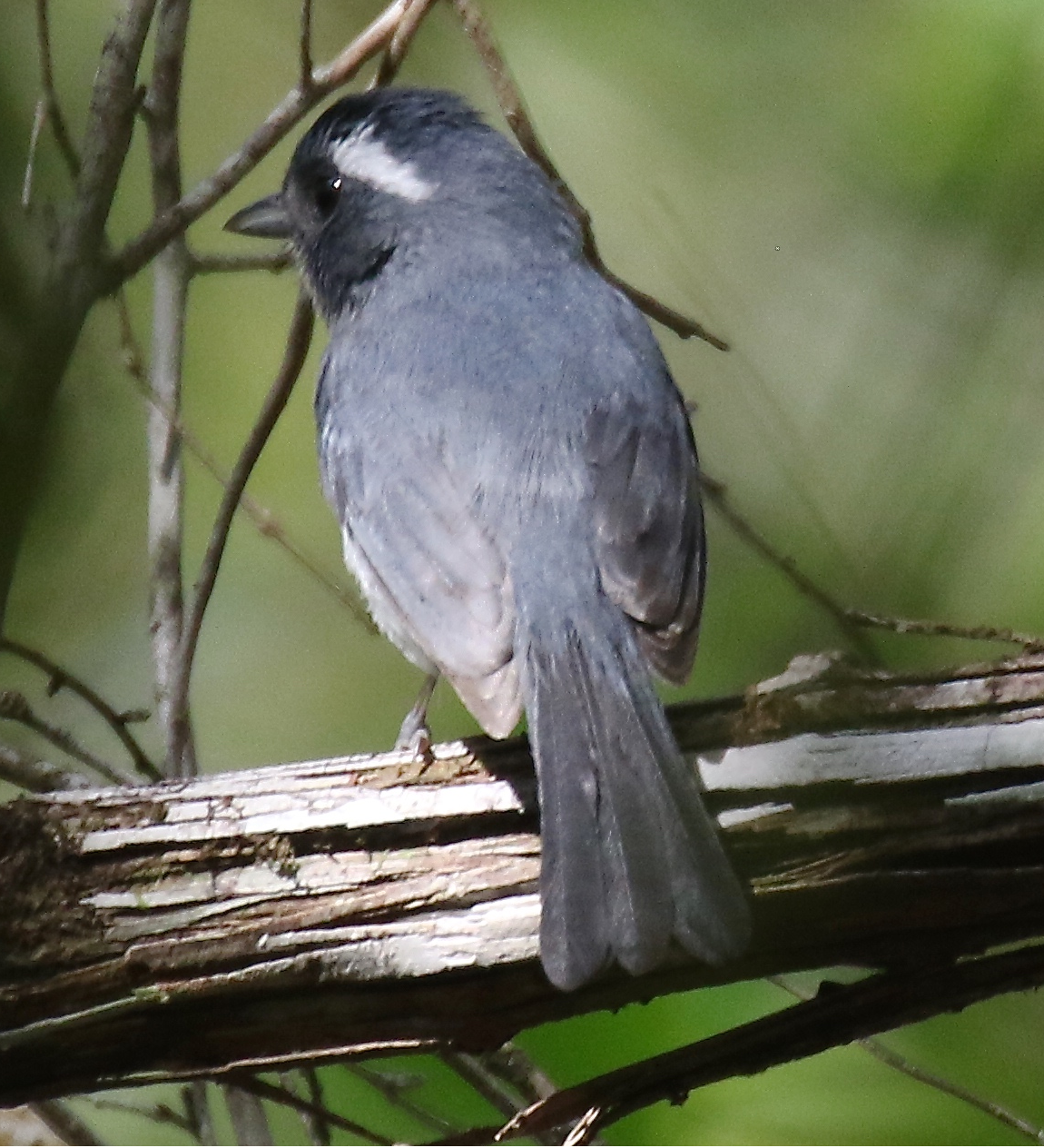
Chan Chich Lodge area - Belize

== Description ==
The grey-throated chat is approximately 13 cm (5.1 in) long and weighs 8.8 to 11 g (0.31 to 0.39 oz). The adult nominate male's head, back, wings, and tail are gray but for a white supercilium behind the eye. The breast and vent area are rose-red, the flanks are gray, and the rest of the underparts are white. The female's crown, nape, and upperparts are a duller gray than the male's. Its supercilium, face, breast, flanks, and vent area are buff; the throat and belly are white. The adult male G. s. boucardi is slightly paler gray than the nominate. The female is brownish gray above and a creamier buff on the face and underparts.

== Distribution and habitat ==
The nominate grey-throated chat is found in southern Veracruz, most of Tabasco, eastern Oaxaca, and northern Chiapas. G. s. boucardi occurs from the Yucatán Peninsula south to central Guatemala and Belize. The species is a bird of the lowlands. It inhabits dry to semi-humid forest, its edges, and adjacent dense scrub. It also occurs in thickets within evergreen forest but shuns humid forest.

== Behavior ==
=== Feeding ===
The grey-throated chat forages by gleaning on the ground and in low vegetation. It often follows army ant swarms. Its diet is insects and other arthropods.

=== Breeding ===
Pairs of grey-throated chats remain on their territory year round. The nest is a cup placed low in vegetation; the only nest found with eggs held two. No other information about its breeding phenology has been published.

=== Vocalization ===
The grey-throated chat's song is " a variable series of 4–5 whistled notes" . One call is a "fairly harsh 'chwit'" .

== Status ==
The IUCN has assessed the grey-throated chat as being of Least Concern. Though there are no population estimates, the species appears to be fairly common.
