= Goof =

Mistake

A goof is a mistake. The term is also used in a number of specific senses: in cinema, it is an error or oversight during production that is visible in the released version of the film.

== Etymology ==
Several origins have been proposed for the word. According to Merriam-Webster, "goof" is likely a variation of "goff" in an English dialect, meaning simpleton. Some say the word may come from an identically pronounced Hebrew word meaning "body", some even say it was just a mistake that happened while typing the word "good", hence the word "goof" is also known as another word for mistake.

The Spanish word gofio refers to the balls of toasted flour and salt eaten by the original inhabitants of the Canary Islands. In Latin America (esp. Cuba) the word "comegofio" (lit. "gofio-eater") came to refer to anyone from the Canaries, stereotyped as primitive or stupid.

== Cinema ==
In filmmaking, a goof is a mistake made during film production that finds its way into the final released picture. Depending upon the film and the actual scene, the goof may have different effects: a loss in realism, an annoyance, or it could just be funny. It is often a type of continuity error. Goofs are also known as "bloopers" or "mistakes".

There are several types of goofs, for example:

- Somebody or something from the film crew is in the picture that wasn't planned (e.g., camera and cameraman is reflected in a mirror, or the microphone is visible, a rope pushing a character over is visible, a hook pulling a character up in the air is visible).
- Chronological or continuity errors (e.g. a cigarette getting longer with the next scene, a cup or glass gaining in volume in the next scene, damage to a building that disappears, or moved props)
- Historical inaccuracies and anachronisms (e.g., an HDTV set in a film set in the 1970s, radio tower in a cowboy movie).
- Geographic: an object or landmark reveals the scene was filmed in a different city than the city it is set. This is very common in Hollywood films that are shot in Canada.
- Problems in audio or soundtrack (e.g. a dog barking before its mouth moves, a person's lips carry on moving after they have finished speaking).
- Intertitles displaying wrong words (e.g. a character called "John" may have his name misspelled Jhon in the subtitles by accident).
- Editing errors, where dialog or events in one scene refer to material that occurred in a prior scene in the screenplay, but which was deleted in the final cut of the film.

Goofs can be found in a large number of films and episodes, even in very expensive productions. The 1977 film Star Wars: Episode IV – A New Hope, for example, has been counted to have 200 goofs in it, ranging from disappearing props to a stormtrooper hitting his head on an opening door.

== See also ==
- Gaffe
- Goofball comedy
