= TV's Naughtiest Blunders =

- Genre: Blooper comedy
- Presented by: Steve Penk (2000–2004)
- Narrated by: Neil Morrissey (2004–2007)
- Country of origin: United Kingdom
- Original language: English
- No. of episodes: 39

Production
- Producers: Carlton Television (ITV Productions)

Original release
- Network: ITV
- Release: 19 April 2000 – 28 July 2007

TV's Naughtiest Blunders is an outtakes show, that ran from 19 April 2000 to 28 July 2007 with 39 episodes. It was shown on ITV and produced by Carlton Television (later ITV Productions).

The show was narrated by Neil Morrissey (first presented by Steve Penk in the studio) and featured edited out clips and mistakes made by people on TV. The show frequently contained swearing, sexual innuendo and nudity, and because of this it was usually shown late at night. The show sometimes featured deleted scenes from the news and soaps as well as documentaries and many other TV programmes.

Steve Penk, a radio DJ who was well known for his "live on-air wind-ups", was the show's first host. Celebrities featured included Martin Clunes, Eamonn Holmes, Amanda Holden, Neil Morrissey, Rik Mayall, Adrian Edmondson, Gino D'Acampo, James Corden, Mike Reid, and Barbara Windsor.

From 2004 to 2007, the show consisted of a voiceover and continuous clips, with commentary from Neil Morrissey who took over from Penk.

Most of the clips shown on the programme were caused by actors forgetting their lines or not being able to stop laughing at what they have to say.
