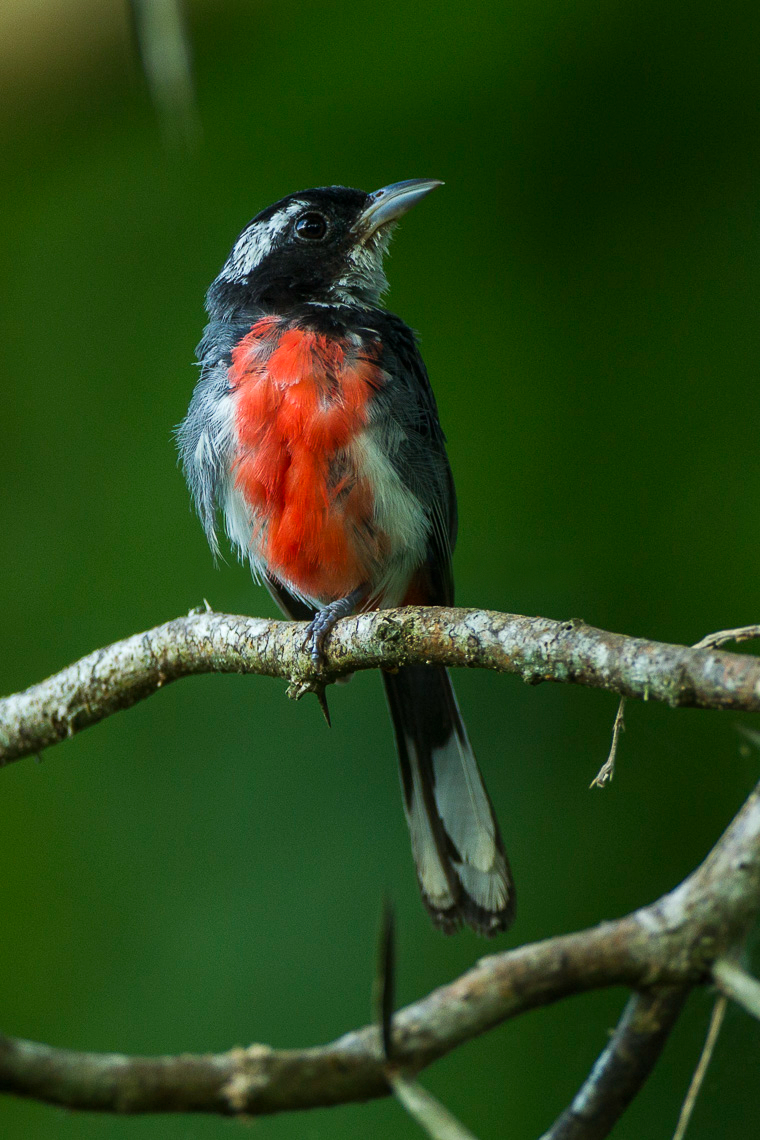

Conservation status
- Least Concern (IUCN 3.1)

Scientific classification
- Kingdom: Animalia
- Phylum: Chordata
- Class: Aves
- Order: Passeriformes
- Family: Cardinalidae
- Genus: Granatellus
- Species: G. venustus

Binomial name
- Granatellus venustus Bonaparte, 1850

= Red-breasted chat =

Species of bird

The red-breasted chat (Granatellus venustus) is a species of bird in the family Cardinalidae, the cardinals or cardinal grosbeaks. It is endemic to Mexico.

== Taxonomy and systematics ==
The genus Granatellus was traditionally placed in family Parulidae, the New World warblers. Studies of DNA sequences in the early 2000s resulted in its being moved to its present family. The red-breasted chat and the other two members of its genus, gray-throated chat (G. sallaei) and rose-breasted chat (G. pelzelni) form a superspecies.

The red-breasted chat has two subspecies, the nominate Granatellus venustus venustus and G. v. francescae.

== Description ==
The red-breasted chat is 14.5 to 16 cm (5.7 to 6.3 in) long; 12 specimens weighed between 10.2 and 11.4 g (0.36 and 0.40 oz). The adult nominate male's upperside is mostly bluish gray. Most of the face is black, though it has a broad white supercilium, and there is a black band across the chest. The chin, throat, sides, and flanks are white; the chest, lower breast, belly, and vent area are vermilion. The adult female's upperparts are slate gray. Most of its face is shades of buff and gray. Its breast and belly are buff and the vent area salmon pink.

The immature male's head and upperparts are similar to those of the adult but with less black. The throat and underparts are whitish with a pink wash to the rear. The immature female is similar to the adult.

== Distribution and habitat ==
The nominate red-breasted chat is endemic to western Mexico. It is found year-round from Sinaloa south to the Isthmus of Tehuantepec and from there into interior Chiapas and possible into northern Guatemala, though there are no records there. It also occurs inland to Morelos along the Balsas River. G. v. francescae is restricted to Islas Marías off Nayarit. It primarily inhabits thorn forest and scrubby woodland and can be found in the understory of secondary forest and other heavy growth. In addition, the species has been reported in evergreen swamp forest inland of mangrove swamps and along rivers. In elevation it generally ranges from sea level to 1,200 m (3,900 ft) though locally it occurs as high as 1,600 m (5,200 ft).

== Behavior ==
=== Feeding ===
Little is known about the red-breasted chat's foraging habits or diet. It is assumed to eat insects and other arthropods.

=== Breeding ===
The red-breasted chat breeds in the wet season, from May to September. Its nest is a cup made of Spanish moss and other fibers lined with finer material. The clutch size is two to four. Females alone incubated the nests but both sexes provided food to nestlings.

=== Vocalization ===
The red-breasted chat's song is a repeated "variable, fairly sweet warble" . Its call is a repeated "wet plek or plik" .

== Status ==
The IUCN has assessed the red-breasted chat as being of Least Concern. However, it occurs in only two protected areas, and less than 20% of the original forest in its range remains intact.
