= Chatter =

Chatter may refer to:

- A person who chats (talks):
  - OnlyFans chatter, a person employed to chat with clients by an OnlyFans model
  - Project CHATTER (1947–53), a U.S. Navy truth serum project
- The sound of many people chatting, small talk:
  - Chatter (signals intelligence), the volume of communication to or from suspected terrorists or spies
  - Chatter (software), enterprise social networking software
- Undesirable small rapid vibrations in a mechanical system:
  - Chatter (contacts) or contact bounce, a common problem with mechanical switches and relays
  - Chatter (machining), unwanted vibrations while cutting material
  - Chattering teeth in response to cold
  - Oscillations in sliding mode control
  - Valve chatter, rapid opening and closing of a pressure relief valve

== See also ==
- Chat (disambiguation)
- Chattering classes, a politically active, socially concerned and highly educated section of the "metropolitan middle class"
- Chatter mark, an indication of glacial erosion
- Chatter Telephone, a classic roll along pull toy with a friendly face and eyes that move up and down when the toy is pulled.
