= Le Chat (disambiguation) =

Le Chat is a Belgian comic strip by Philippe Geluck.

Le Chat may also refer to:

- Lê Chất (died 1826), Vietnamese mandarin and general
- Le Chat (novel), a 1967 novel by Belgian writer Simenon
- Le Chat (film), a 1971 French film
- "Le Chat" (song), a 1992 single by Pow woW
- Le Chat, a sculpture by Alberto Giacometti; see Grande tête mince § Auction
- Le Chat, a generative AI chatbot by Mistral AI, now known as Mistral Vibe

== See also ==
- Chat (disambiguation)
