= Don Carney =

American radio personality (died 1954)

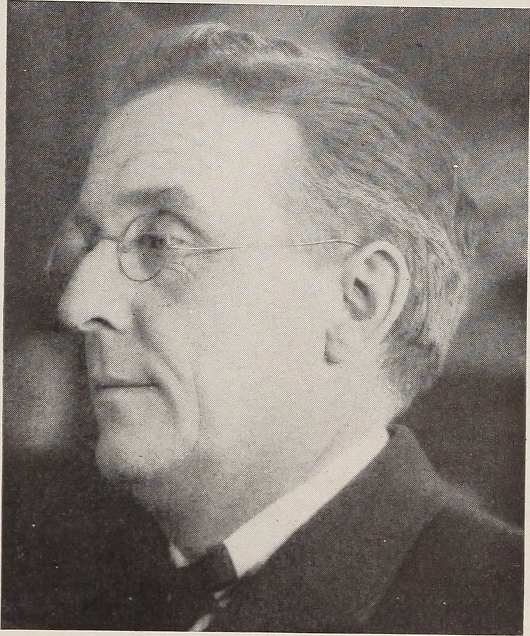
- Carney in c. 1930
- Born: Howard Rice; St. Joseph, Michigan, U.S.
- Died: January 14, 1954; Miami, Florida, U.S.
- Presenting career
- Show: Uncle Don
- Stations: WOR, New York City
- Network: Mutual
- Country: United States

Don Carney (born Howard Rice; died January 14, 1954) was an American radio personality and children's radio show host. He was best known for hosting Uncle Don, a children's radio program that aired on WOR in New York from 1928 to 1949.

== Early life ==
Carney was born Howard Rice in St. Joseph, Michigan, and was educated in Michigan public schools. He left home and entered the vaudeville circuit at a young age, initially performing stock Irishman roles. He began using the stage name Don Carney at the age of 15.

Carney toured the Midwest with stock companies before beginning his radio career as an announcer at WMCA in New York. He later joined WOR.

== Career ==
=== Uncle Don ===
In September 1928, WOR premiered Uncle Don, a children's radio program hosted by Carney. The program featured Carney singing, playing the piano, telling stories and introducing activities for his young listeners, whom he called his "nieces" and "nephews". Segments included the "Healthy Child's Club" and the "Talent Quest". Winners of the Talent Quest were sometimes offered screen tests for films.

Uncle Don generally aired five or six days a week on WOR, with occasional Sunday morning broadcasts. The program was also carried by the Mutual Broadcasting System in 1938 and 1939. It attracted a large audience and became one of the best-known locally produced children's radio programs of its time.

=== Urban legend ===
A widely circulated urban legend claimed that Carney was fired after accidentally insulting his young listeners during a broadcast. According to the story, after signing off with his usual "Goodnight, little friends, good night", Carney believed his microphone was off and remarked, "There! That ought to hold the little bastards." The microphone was supposedly still live, allowing listeners to hear the comment. The story claimed that the resulting public outrage ended his radio career.

The story was circulating by the 1930s and was already being described as untrue in contemporary accounts. There is no evidence that Carney made the remark on air or that he was dismissed over such an incident. His radio career continued after he left WOR.

The rumor gained further attention through Kermit Schafer, a radio and television producer known for compiling recordings of broadcasting mistakes, or "bloopers". Schafer included a recording of the alleged incident on one of his Bloopers albums, but the recording was a staged recreation rather than an original broadcast.

== Later career and death ==
Carney moved to Florida in the late 1940s, where he hosted another children's radio program on WKAT in Miami Beach. He continued broadcasting there until shortly before his death.

Carney died at his home in Miami on January 14, 1954, following a heart ailment.
