= Independence USA (TV series) =

Reality television series

Independence USA is a reality series that follows Frank Belcastro and his family as they prepare to live life "off the grid," in the event of a potential catastrophe. On January 18, 2012, the series premiered on GBTV (now known as TheBlaze TV), Glenn Beck's live streaming video network. The show lasted one season.

Originally Independence USA was called Apocalypse PA and was aired on the History Channel. The first episode aired on the History Channel on November 16, 2010.

Independence USA is produced by Steve Rotfeld Productions (SRP).
