= Choosing Healthplans All Together =

"Choosing Healthplans All Together" (CHAT) is the name given to a simulation exercise in which players decide which benefit types (e.g. hospitalization, consultations, tests, imaging, medicines, etc.) they would like to include in their health insurance package, and what level of service (basic or high) they prioritize. This activity emphasizes the critical need to design health insurance benefit packages based on local information. The core goal of this exercise is to ascertain which benefit package best reflects the priorities of the group of players within a finite budget allocated for health insurance and within the circumstances in which the participants live.

The CHAT simulation exercise consists of a game-like activity in which the participants (usually in groups of 12 to 15 people) can choose between different benefit types, and for each type, the coverage level that are realistically priced, based on actuarial estimates reflecting the unit cost and utilization data that apply locally, and that were used to calculate the costs before the simulation exercise unfolds. In this way, the simulation exercise can focus on a simplified decision making process that enables participants to visualize the trade-offs they make, while the complicated actuarial calculations involving statistical information are separated.

The CHAT exercise is usually run in several rounds to facilitate the learning process. In the first round, participants individually choose benefit packages that meet their and their families’ needs; the first round serves mainly to teach participants the rules of the game. In subsequent rounds, participants can validate their choices by checking how well they would be covered under different scenarios. The scenarios are described in “health event cards” that each player pulls out from a deck of cards in turn, and reads out aloud; this way, the entire group can validate choices made in the previous round. As the CHAT tool is intended to design a health insurance benefit package for a specific target group, the entire group of participants has to reach consensus on one benefit package for the entire group or community in one of the rounds. The entire process is led by a facilitator who follows a script, which ensures that explanations and process are as standard and comparable as possible in different groups or locations. The process can therefore be seen as a version of a Focus group Discussion.

In 2005 the CHAT tool was thoroughly revised to be tested in the context of a low-income country, with prospective clients who are simultaneously characterized by having low-income, low-education, low-numeracy, rural, and with little or no experience with insurance. Premiums must be low for the poor target population. However, low premiums impose limited coverage, or rationing of benefits. The testing took place in India. As the target population has no access to a national health insurance scheme and rarely buys commercial health insurance products, any attempt to upscale demand for HI among grassroots groups (in India and elsewhere) would require establishing the specific benefits that clients prioritize within a defined, very low, budget. The CHAT simulation exercise had to be changed to give participants choices reflecting the reality prevailing in rural India. Thus, fewer benefit types were offered in India compared to those offered in the US version of CHAT. The levels of benefits had to be reduced as well (basic-or-high, versus the basic-or-medium-or-high options in the US) and the service levels had to be redesigned to reflect only differences in the degree of reimbursement (in the Indian version) while excluding qualitative aspects of healthcare services such as choice of provider (referred to in the US version). And, obviously, the actuarial estimates of the costs of benefits, and consequently also the overall limited cost of the premium payable, were adapted to context.

The exercise in India involved a number of persons who were new to the topic of giving prospective clients choice. Some of the persons who were involved, or observed the CHAT experimentation in the field, offered their impressions of the impact of the CHAT exercises in India: “… [I] have personally experienced / observed that participants – illiteracy notwithstanding – come to an understanding of the concept of insurance… and would like insurance to be available in their villages… The CHAT tool can facilitate the best community choice through consensus… CHAT enhances clients’ awareness of the link between premiums they pay and benefits they can reasonably expect from the insurance… This learning culture of CHAT can clear misunderstandings and, consequently, people will have confidence in the scheme… Only by consulting the people themselves can one break away from the current traditional method of designing insurance solutions based on biased information… [and overcome] the prejudice that the illiterate (poor) are unable to decide their own lives and that health insurance is too complicated for them” (see the Changemakers Forum: )

The salient point is that the poor themselves are best placed to determine what should be included in their benefit package, as this involvement creates trust, acceptance and willingness to be insured.

As for the substantive results of the CHAT exercises in India, the most consistent finding has been that respondents selected broad benefit packages at basic coverage levels that reflect high aggregate costs (unavailable on the market today) over narrow packages with higher coverage. This brings to light an important mismatch between prevailing demand of health insurance among the poor in India and prevailing supply of health insurance in India, which is dominated by packages that cover mainly low-frequency-&-high-cost events. Furthermore, close to 100% of respondents included coverage of medicines and maternity in the benefit-package. Both these benefits are excluded from commercial HI in India today.

The original CHAT tool was developed in 1995 by physician ethicists at the National Institutes of Health and the University of Michigan in the United States. It was tested in the US in various locations.
