= Kermit Schafer =

American screenwriter

- Born: March 24, 1914
- Died: March 8, 1979 (aged 64)
- Occupations: Writer and producer

Kermit Schafer (March 24, 1914 – March 8, 1979) was an American writer and producer for radio and television in the 1950s and 1960s. He is best known for his collections of "bloopers"—the word Schafer popularized for mistakes and gaffes of radio and TV announcers and personalities.

== Early bloopers ==
Bloopers came into prominence in 1931, when radio announcer Harry Von Zell mispronounced or said the name of the then-President of the United States, Herbert Hoover, as "Hoobert Heever" on the air, but Schafer's is believed to be the first attempt at collecting and presenting them. Other similar famous finds of Schafer's include ABC correspondent Joel Daly intoning, "The rumor that the President would veto the bill is reported to have come from a high White Horse souse", and veteran radio host Paul Harvey breaking into uncontrollable laughter at a story about a pet poodle.

These were collected and released in LP audio collections such as Pardon My Blooper! and Your Slip is Showing, which were briefly popular in the 1960s. A movie version, Pardon My Blooper, was released in 1974. It made $1,473,000 at the box office.

These led the way for such later TV shows as TV's Bloopers & Practical Jokes hosted by Dick Clark. Schafer himself gained minor celebrity under the nickname "The Blooper Man". Schafer also published a number of books, such as Kermit Schafer's Blunderful World of Bloopers (1973) and Bloopers, Bloopers, Bloopers (1984).

== Criticism and controversy ==
Schafer has come under criticism from TV and radio historians who have noted his deceptive presentations in his albums. If Schafer could not obtain an actual audio recording of the event (as many of these bloopers occurred live and were not always transcribed onto recordings), he would simply hire actors and recreate the event—without offering any disclaimer. This led to some misrepresentations. For example, the blooper by Harry Von Zell described above was not recorded, so Schafer recreated it.

Schafer is historically remembered for an unwittingly libelous dramatization of an incident that never happened. On his vinyl record Pardon My Blooper!, Volume 1, Schafer replicated the famous radio show host "Uncle Don" Carney, who broadcast on WOR in New York City to millions of children from 1928 to 1947. In Schafer's brief drama, Uncle Don mistakenly believes his microphone is off, then utters a contemptuous indecency.

== Legacy ==
After Schafer's death on March 8, 1979, in Miami, Florida, shortly before his 65th birthday, his title of "Keeper of the Bloopers" passed to Dick Clark, who hosted and produced a long-running series of blooper specials (and a weekly program) beginning in the early 1980s. When Clark picked up the mantle, recordings of bloopers were far more easily obtainable, and in fact were often provided willingly by the producers of films and TV shows as a way of promoting their product.

Clark followed in Schafer's footsteps by releasing an album of bloopers from radio broadcasts. Clark's TV blooper shows always carried a dedication to "Kermit Schafer, Mr. Blooper", and the success of Clark's program led to the development of many imitators which continue to be broadcast as of 2008.

== Recordings ==
Seven Pardon My Blooper albums were released in the late 1950s-early 1960s on Jubilee Records. The first, named Radio Bloopers, sold over one million copies, and was awarded a gold disc. Schafer also issued blooper compilation albums for Kapp Records in the late 1960s and early 1970s. Many of these recordings would be reissued in the 1970s by K-Tel Records. 1970s compilations were also issued on MCA Records; Best of the Bloopers in 1973, and a six-volume All Time Great Bloopers set to mark the 25th anniversary of the first blooper record in 1977. Volumes 5 & 6 contained some previously unreleased material.

He produced non-blooper comedy albums, among them Jubilee releases for Will Jordan and Peter Wood in the 1960s and Citizen's Bloopers, a spoof of the then-current CB craze in 1977. He edited a number of books transcribing bloopers, with some books covering certain themes such as bloopers from classified advertising and television broadcasts.
