= Steve Penk =

British radio and television presenter

- Born: 1961 or 1962 (age 64–65); Manchester, England
- Occupations: Radio personality; Television presenter

Steve Penk is a British radio and television presenter. He was born in Rusholme in Manchester and attended Hazel Grove High School. At the age of 16, he started his radio career at Piccadilly Radio in 1978 (subsequently rebranded Key 103), where his breakfast show delivered record ratings, the highest in the station's history to this day.

In 1997, Penk moved on to work at Capital Radio London, presenting the mid-morning show. On his programme he regularly did his famous radio wind-ups. It was during one of these wind-up calls that Penk had the idea to call the then British Prime Minister, Tony Blair. Penk was able to get through the No. 10 switchboard and managed to get Blair on the air for a few minutes. Blair later mentioned during Prime Minister's Questions that Penk had prank-called him that morning, and at that point it became a global media story.

In 2001, Penk moved to Virgin Radio, where he replaced Chris Evans on the breakfast show and increased the audience by 300,000 listeners in the first three months. Penk then returned to Capital FM in 2002 to present a networked late show.

After a year presenting the late show on Capital Radio, networked to a number of other stations, Penk returned to Manchester's Key 103; however, he left at the end of 2006. Penk returned to the airwaves on Fox FM in Oxfordshire in March 2007 as its new breakfast show presenter. However, he announced on 15 January 2008 he would be leaving the station by March 2008 due to "internal politics".

He also presented a number of primetime TV shows for ITV, such as TV Nightmares, The Way They Were and When Athletes Attack. Penk made guest appearances on Blankety Blank and a few series of TV's Naughtiest Blunders on ITV1.

On Thursday 4 September 2008, it was announced that Penk had bought the entire share capital in the radio station 96.2 the Revolution. Almost immediately after the purchase, Penk made major changes both to the schedule and to the playlist. The changes led to outrage from some listeners to the station and departure of some of the station's DJs. However, after changing the station's format Penk managed to quadruple the audience.

In January 2014, he sold 96.2 the Revolution. In 2015, Penk launched the Steve Penk Wind-Up Channel on DAB+ in Manchester, featuring wind-up/prank calls 24/7.

In 2016, Penk created and launched Radio Dead, a globally unique radio station that only plays artistes who are deceased. Penk closed Radio Dead, along with another internet based station that he owned, at the end of November 2019.

In 2019, he started a podcast of his BBC Radio 4 Extra series Radio Nightmares, featuring mistakes and bloopers from all types of radio broadcasting across the world.

He stood in on the 10pm Saturday night show on Greatest Hits Radio in June 2021.

== Television appearances ==
- TV Nightmares
- Would I Lie To You?
- Russian Roulette
- Blankety Blank
- The Way They Were: Coronation Street Special
- TV's Naughtiest Blunders
- This Morning
