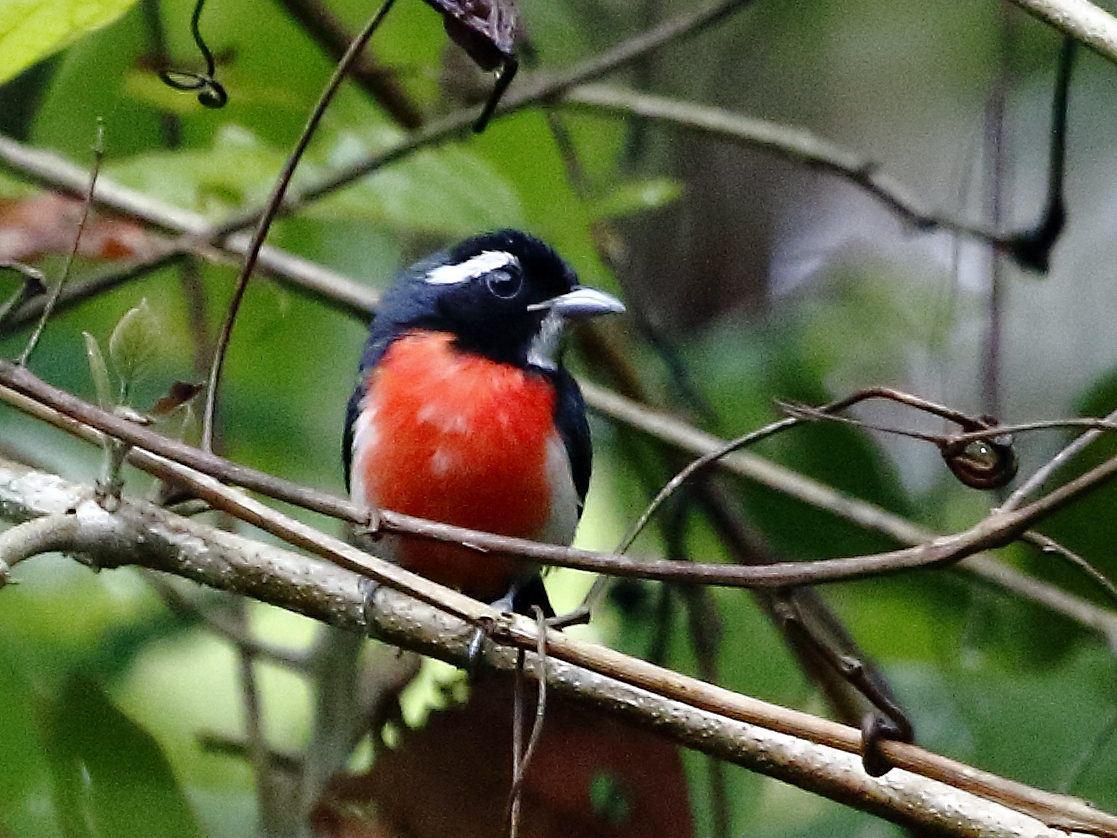

Conservation status
- Least Concern (IUCN 3.1)

Scientific classification
- Domain: Eukaryota
- Kingdom: Animalia
- Phylum: Chordata
- Class: Aves
- Order: Passeriformes
- Family: Cardinalidae
- Genus: Granatellus
- Species: G. pelzelni

Binomial name
- Granatellus pelzelni Sclater, PL, 1865

= Rose-breasted chat =

Species of bird

The rose-breasted chat (Granatellus pelzelni) is a species of bird in the family Cardinalidae, the cardinals or cardinal grosbeaks. It is found in Bolivia, Brazil, Colombia French Guiana, Guyana, Suriname and Venezuela.

== Taxonomy and systematics ==
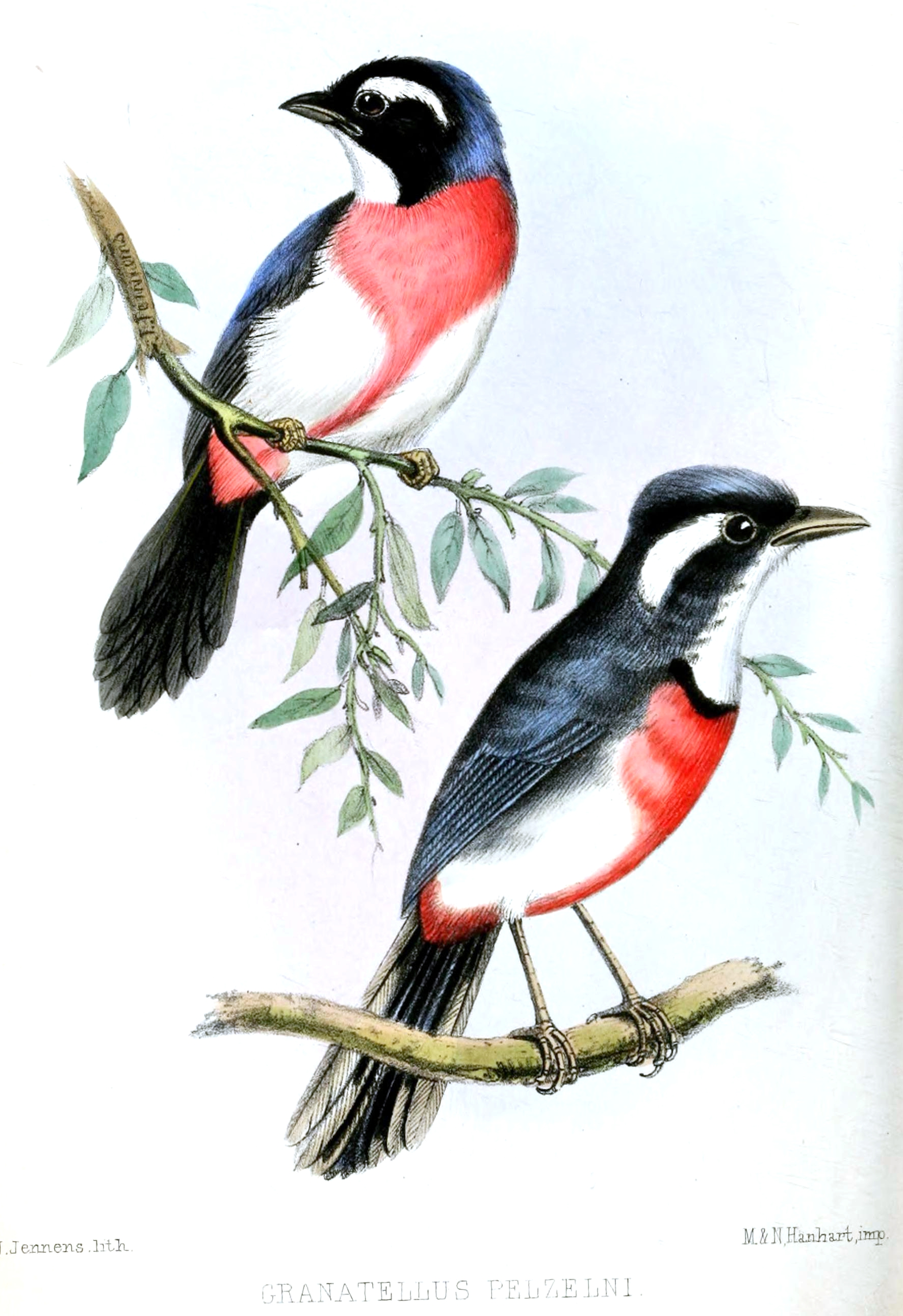

The genus Granatellus was traditionally placed in family Parulidae, the New World warblers. Studies of DNA sequences in the early 2000s resulted in its being moved to its present family. The rose-breasted chat and the other two members of its genus, red-breasted chat (G. venustus) and grey-throated chat (G. sallaei) form a superspecies.

The rose-breasted chat has two subspecies, the nominate Granatellus pelzelni pelzelni and G. p. paraensis. The latter might be a species in its own right ("rose-bellied chat"), based on differences in plumage and vocalizations from the nominate.

== Description ==
The nominate rose-breasted chat is 12 to 12.5 cm (4.7 to 4.9 in) long and weighs 10 to 12.5 g (0.35 to 0.44 oz). The male has a black head with a white supercilium, blue-gray upperparts, and a black tail. Its throat is white with a thin black line separating it from the rose-red breast, belly, and vent area. It has white flanks separating the blue-gray and red. The female's crown, nape, and upperparts are blue-gray and the tail black. Its face, breast, flanks, and vent are a rich buff and its throat and belly are white.

The male G. p. paraensis is also 12 to 12.5 cm (4.7 to 4.9 in) long. Its plumage differs from the nominate's in that its head is gray except for the forecrown, its underparts are a deeper red, and the white of the flanks is much reduced or absent. The female is essentially identical to the nominate.

== Distribution and habitat ==
The nominate rose-breasted chat is found in extreme eastern Colombia east through southern and southeastern Venezuela and the Guianas and southwest through central and eastern Amazonian Brazil to extreme northern Bolivia. G. p. paraensis is found east of the Tocantins River in far eastern Amazonian Brazil. Both subspecies inhabit tropical rainforest and its edges and are often found by rivers or lagoons in the forest interior. The nominate also inhabits drier deciduous forest and mature secondary forest. The nominate's range is mostly at low elevation but reaches as high as 850 m (2,790 ft) in southern Venezuela. G. p. paraensis's range is almost entirely at very low elevation.

== Behavior ==
=== Feeding ===
The nominate rose-breasted chat's diet is thought to be mostly or entirely insects and other invertebrates. It forages mostly at middle to high levels but sometimes in the understory; it gleans foliage and sallies out to catch flying insects. In the non-breeding season it may join mixed-species foraging flocks. G. p. paraensis's diet and foraging habits have not been documented but are assumed to be similar to those of the nominate.

=== Breeding ===
Nothing is known about either rose-breasted chat subspecies' breeding phenology except that a nominate male was in breeding condition when collected in January and a nominate juvenile was observed in molt in early May.

=== Vocalization ===
The nominate rose-breasted chat's song is " a series of 5–6 clear, sweet notes on one pitch". Its calls include a repeated "jrrt". G. p. paraensis's song is alternating "mellow low-pitched downslurred whistles and harsher short high-pitched notes".

== Status ==
The IUCN has assessed both subspecies of rose-breasted chat as being of Least Concern. "No population estimates [of the nominate are] available, but known from a number of protected areas." However, G. p. paraensis "is suspected to lose 22–25% of suitable habitat within its distribution over three generations (12 years)".
