= (Z)-3-hexen-1-ol acetyltransferase =

Class of enzymes

Identifiers
- EC no.: 2.3.1.195

Databases
- IntEnz: IntEnz view
- BRENDA: BRENDA entry
- ExPASy: NiceZyme view
- KEGG: KEGG entry
- MetaCyc: metabolic pathway
- PRIAM: profile
- PDB structures: RCSB PDB PDBe PDBsum
Search
- PMC: articles
- PubMed: articles
- NCBI: proteins

(Z)-3-hexen-1-ol acetyltransferase (EC 2.3.1.195, CHAT, At3g03480) is an enzyme with systematic name acetyl-CoA:(3Z)-hex-3-en-1-ol acetyltransferase. This enzyme catalyses the following chemical reaction

(3Z)-3-hexen-1-ol
+
acetyl-CoA
(3Z)-3-hexenyl acetate
+ coenzyme A

The enzyme is responsible for the production of the volatile ester, (3Z)-3-hexenyl acetate, which is produced by the plant Arabidopsis thaliana in response to leaf damage.
