= The Lighter Side of Sports =

US blooper television program

The Lighter Side of Sports is a syndicated American sports blooper program produced by Steve Rotfeld Productions. The series, at the time of its cancellation, was hosted by Mike Golic. Lighter Side is the first and longest-running of Rotfeld's productions, utilizing Rotfeld's extensive collection of stock footage.

== Cable ==
The first incarnation of The Lighter Side of Sports aired on ESPN from 1986 to 1990. In addition to sports bloopers, interviews with sports figures and comedians in front of a live audience were included, along with music from the house bands, The Flamin' Caucasians (1986–1988) and Nik and the Nice Guys (1989–1990). Jay Johnstone was the original host, later replaced in 1989 by Jim Valvano. That first incarnation of The Lighter Side of Sports was the forerunner to another long-running Steve Rotfeld-produced sports blooper series: the syndicated Super Sports Follies, which Johnstone hosted.

== Syndication: Bob Uecker shows ==
The idea behind the current version of The Lighter Side of Sports had its genesis in Bob Uecker's Wacky World of Sports (also known as Bob Uecker's Sports Show), which began airing in syndication in 1985. As the name implied, "Mr. Baseball" Bob Uecker was the host of a sort of mock talk show. Uecker's incarnation involved numerous sports bloopers and oddities, as well as numerous jokes and sketches involving Uecker himself, often in front of a live audience. Since Rotfeld had just begun compiling stock footage at the time, that required more room for comedy. A typical episode would include a few comedy sketches featuring Uecker (usually leading into a series of clips), three music videos, an interview with an actor posing as an eccentric athlete of some sort, and the rest filled with sports bloopers and videos of unusual sports, many of which date back several decade.

== Mike Golic era ==
In the 1990s, Uecker left the show, and the concept was revamped. ESPN's "Lighter Side" and the Uecker series were merged into a new show that retained the Lighter Side name. A synthesizer-based theme song and digitally-generated opening sequence was produced, and Golic was tapped to host. Uecker's sketches were replaced with more bloopers and spectacular sports accidents, and Golic's role was reduced to one comparable to a disc jockey, introducing clips coming in and out of commercial breaks (often at some sporting venue as part of a running gag to tie the show together).

In its over fifteen-year run, only 46 episodes hosted by Golic were produced. Only a few new episodes have been produced each year (most of the Golic run was produced in the early-to-middle 1990s), so to fill the gap, all 46 Golic-hosted shows air in rotation, with new shows added in as they are produced.

The series ended its syndication run some time in the late 2000s as Rotfeld shifted his focus to cable television and educational/informational-compliant programming.

The Uecker and ESPN versions of the show have not been seen since the early 1990s, although at least two Uecker episodes were released to VHS under the title "The Best of Bob Uecker's Wacky World of Sports, Volumes 1 and 2." 65 ESPN episodes were produced, and 30 shows were produced that Uecker hosted (18 under the Wacky World title and 12 under the Sports Show title).
