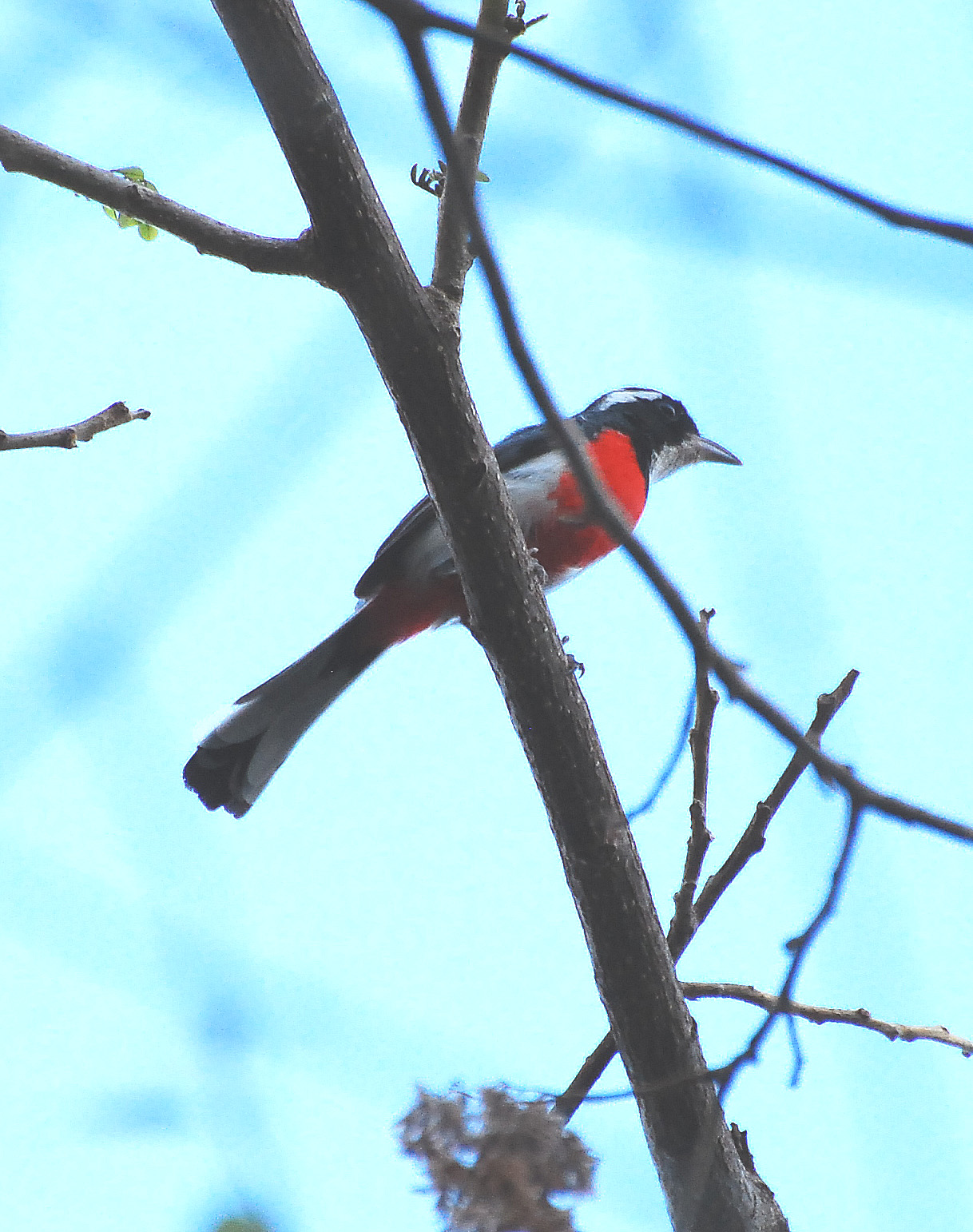
- Red-breasted chat (Granatellus venustus)

Scientific classification
- Kingdom: Animalia
- Phylum: Chordata
- Class: Aves
- Order: Passeriformes
- Family: Cardinalidae
- Genus: Granatellus; Bonaparte, 1850

Type species
- Granatellus venustus Bonaparte, 1850

= Granatellus =

Genus of birds

Granatellus is a genus of bird previously placed in the family Parulidae, although biochemical evidence suggests it belongs in Cardinalidae, a move followed by the American Ornithologists' Union in 2009.

== Species ==
Genus Granatellus – Bonaparte, 1850 – three species
Common name	Scientific name and subspecies	Range	Size and ecology	IUCN status and estimated population
Rose-breasted chat	Granatellus pelzelni Sclater, PL, 1865 Two subspecies: G. p. pelzelni; G. p. paraensis	Bolivia, Brazil, French Guiana, Guyana, Suriname and Venezuela	Size: Habitat: Diet:	LC
Grey-throated chat	Granatellus sallaei (Bonaparte, 1856)	Belize, Guatemala, and Mexico.	Size: Habitat: Diet:	LC
Red-breasted chat	Granatellus venustus (Bonaparte, 1850) Two subspecies: G. v. venustus; G. v. francescae	Mexican Pacific slope thorn forests from Sinaloa to Chiapas	Size: Habitat: Diet:	LC
Rose-bellied chat	Granatellus paraensis Rothschild, 1906	north-eastern Brazil	Size: Habitat: Diet:	LC
