= Chat Room (TV program) =

American educational television series

- Genre: Educational
- Country of origin: United States
- Original language: English
- No. of seasons: 1

Production
- Production company: Steve Rotfeld Productions

Original release
- Network: Syndication
- Release: 2012

Chat Room is a 2012 American educational television series. Produced by Steve Rotfeld Productions (SRP), it consisted consisting of a panel young people that discusses teen-oriented issues, with panelists giving their opinions, and advising kids on how to deal with potential problems. The series was broadcast in syndication.
