= Chat Room (novel) =

2006 novel by Barbara Biggs

- First edition cover
- Author: Barbara Biggs
- Language: English
- Genre: Thriller novel
- Publisher: Micklind Enterprises
- Publication date: 31 January 2006
- Publication place: Australia
- Media type: Print (Paperback)
- Pages: 120 pp
- ISBN: 0-9775112-0-0
- OCLC: 156749481

Chat Room is a thriller novel written by Barbara Biggs. It was published in Australia in 2006 by Micklind Enterprises.

== Plot ==
A young girl aged 13, Samantha, is extremely lonely after moving from Sydney to Melbourne. Both of her parents work long hours and she starts getting interested in chat rooms, where she meets new friends. While in the chat rooms she stumbles across a guy named Robin. He pretends to be 17, though he is really 27, and makes Sam feel special. He is charming, smart, romantic and good-looking.

Robin tells Sam that they have to wait for a while before he can tell her his final secret, which she does not realise is his age. Eventually he lets her know that he is 27, which upsets her. After 10 days of stress and depression, she goes back online and asks to talk to him. He answers her and they confess to liking each other, then they decide to meet. She goes to meet him and finds him attractive. They go for a walk.

While Sam is away, Erica, her babysitter, realises Sam is missing and finds the emails from Robin. She calls the police and they set out to find her. Robin is caught and Sam is told what happened. Robin has been to court several times on child sexual abuse charges and has been let go on all charges before now because there was a lack of evidence. Now Robin is taken in by the police and will be sent to prison.
