= Chats, California =

Chats
- Former settlement
- Location in California
- Coordinates: 39°46′27″N 120°04′24″W
- Country: United States
- State: California
- County: Lassen
- Elevation: 4,810 ft (1,466 m)

Chats (also, Chat) is a former settlement in Lassen County, California, United States. It was located on the Nevada–California–Oregon Railway, 2 miles (3.2 km) east-southeast of Beckwourth Pass and 3.5 miles (5.6 km) southeast of Summit, at an elevation of 4810 feet (1466 m). Chats still appeared on maps as of 1894.

The Chat post office operated from 1885 to 1894, and from 1896 to 1900. The name is of Native American origin.
