= Steve Rotfeld =

American television producer and writer

Steve Rotfeld is an American television producer and writer. He is the principal founder of two independent broadcast and syndication production companies: Steve Rotfeld Productions (SRP) and The Workshop, which he co-founded with Tom Farrell. Through SRP and The Workshop, Rotfeld has produced and distributed programming that has been syndicated on national broadcast and cable networks and sold throughout the world.

While working for his father, Berl Rotfeld's company Greatest Sports Legends, Inc. (GSL), Rotfeld won the National Sports Emmy Award for Outstanding Writing for The Legend Of Jackie Robinson.

== Steve Rotfeld Productions ==
Steve Rotfeld Productions (SRP) is a television production and broadcast syndication company founded by Steve Rotfeld. In the mid-1980s, SRP began producing and syndicating Bob Uecker’s Wacky World of Sports, the first weekly sports blooper show on television, and went on to produce several other sports blooper programs, eventually leading to his most widely distributed show, The Lighter Side of Sports, which ran in syndication for nearly two decades.

In the early 1990s, SRP began producing and syndicating children's educational and informational E/I series, which now includes Awesome Adventures, Wild About Animals, Whaddyado, Chat Room and Animal Science. Additionally, SRP is currently producing one-hour quarterly specials of its popular sports programs and Greatest Sports Legends and Sports Gone Wild.

In addition to cable networks ESPN and Animal Planet, SRP has also produced shows for TLC, The History Channel, TruTV, and The Travel Channel.

== The WorkShop ==
In 2008 Steve formed The Workshop along with Tom Farrell. Through the WorkShop, LLC, Rotfeld has executive produced four series for the Golf Channel: The Haney Project, Camp Haney, Donald J. Trump's Fabulous World of Golf and Golf in America.

The Haney Project features Hank Haney (Tiger Woods's former swing coach) teaching a celebrity how to become a better golfer. Since its premiere, the show has featured NBA Hall-of-Famer Charles Barkley; Emmy Award-winning actor/comedian Ray Romano; and controversial radio talk-show host, Rush Limbaugh.

The fourth season of The Haney Project (airing February – April 2012) will feature four celebrities: Adam Levine (Maroon 5 and The Voice), legendary boxer Sugar Ray Leonard, celebrity chef Mario Batali, and former super model Angie Everhart competing against each other for the chance to win over $100,000 for the charity of their choice.

Additionally, The WorkShop is producing the reality series Independence USA with GBTV, Glenn Beck's live streaming video network. The show follows Frank Belcastro and his family as they try to become completely independent and prepare for life “off the grid," admiring the way people lived in the 19th century. Independence USA premiered January 18, 2012 on GBTV.
