= Awesome Adventures =

- Genre: Documentary
- Written by: Tom Farrell; Steve Rotfeld
- Presented by: Nicole Dabeau
- Narrated by: Nicole Dabeau
- Country of origin: United States
- Original language: English

Production
- Executive producer: Steve Rotfeld
- Producer: Jason Evans (2012 - current)
- Running time: 23 mins
- Production company: Steve Rotfeld Productions

Original release
- Release: 1998 – present

Awesome Adventures is an adventure/travel series that takes teenagers on journeys around the world to experience a wide range of destinations and diverse activities. The E/I syndicated series is produced and distributed by Steve Rotfeld Productions (SRP) and has been hosted by Nicole Dabeau since 2012. In 2014, Awesome Adventures was nominated for an Emmy award in the category of Best Daytime Travel Series.

== Hosts ==
- Nicole Dabeau (Current)
- Christopher Scott Grimaldi
- Mystro Clark
- A.T. Montgomery
- J. August Richards
- Taran Killam (guest host, 1 episode)

== Places Traveled ==
=== United States ===
- Boise, ID
- Chicago, Illinois
- Detroit, MI
- Hawaii
- Minnesota
- Moab, UT
- Portland, OR
- San Antonio, Texas
- South Carolina
- Stowe, VT
- Lake Tahoe
- Pittsburgh, PA
- Denver, CO
- Philadelphia, PA

=== Overseas ===
- Africa
- Aruba
- Australia
- Bahamas
- Belize
- Brazil
- Cancun
- Cayman Islands
- Colombia
- Croatia
- Curaçao
- England
- Haiti
- Jamaica
- Malaysia
- Nevis
- Puerto Rico
- Scotland
- St. Kitts
- St. Lucia
- Tahiti
