= Outtake TV =

- Presented by: Paul O'Grady (2002–2003); Anne Robinson (2003–2009); Rufus Hound (2010–2011)
- Country of origin: United Kingdom
- Original language: English

Production
- Running time: 30 minutes

Original release
- Network: BBC One
- Release: 25 December 2002 – 19 February 2011

Related
- Auntie's Bloomers

Outtake TV is a blooper show originally hosted by Paul O'Grady, then by Anne Robinson and finally by Rufus Hound. The show replaced BBC One's original blooper show Auntie's Bloomers and consisted of various clips past and present of bloopers from TV and film. Various special episodes were aired, consisting mainly of clips from one programme, most notably EastEnders and The Weakest Link.

== Transmissions ==
Airdate	Edition	Host
25 December 2002	Regular	Paul O'Grady
27 December 2002	Regular	Paul O'Grady
20 April 2003	Regular	Paul O'Grady
26 April 2003	Regular	Paul O'Grady
25 December 2003	Weakest Link Special	Anne Robinson
26 December 2003	Regular	Anne Robinson
2 July 2004	Regular	Anne Robinson
9 July 2004	Regular	Anne Robinson
16 July 2004	Regular	Anne Robinson
23 July 2004	Kids TV Special	Anne Robinson
30 July 2004	Weakest Link Special	Anne Robinson
24 December 2004	Christmas Special	Anne Robinson
27 August 2005	Weakest Link Special	Anne Robinson
9 September 2005	Regular	Anne Robinson
16 September 2005	Regular	Anne Robinson
23 September 2005	Regular	Anne Robinson
30 September 2005	Weakest Link Special	Anne Robinson
29 October 2005	Regular	Anne Robinson
10 December 2005	Regular	Anne Robinson
26 December 2005	Regular	Anne Robinson
9 January 2006	Regular	Anne Robinson
8 September 2006	Weakest Link Special	Anne Robinson
6 October 2006	EastEnders Special	Anne Robinson
3 November 2006	Regular	Anne Robinson
10 November 2006	Regular	Anne Robinson
1 December 2006	Regular	Anne Robinson
8 December 2006	Regular	Anne Robinson
22 December 2006	Regular	Anne Robinson
22 September 2007	Weakest Link Daytime Special	Anne Robinson
10 November 2007	Weakest Link Primetime Special	Anne Robinson
17 November 2007	Regular	Anne Robinson
24 November 2007	Regular	Anne Robinson
15 December 2007	Regular	Anne Robinson
9 February 2008	Regular	Anne Robinson
20 December 2008	EastEnders Special	Anne Robinson
10 January 2009	Regular	Anne Robinson
17 January 2009	Regular	Anne Robinson
24 January 2009	Regular	Anne Robinson
7 March 2009	Regular	Anne Robinson
20 March 2009	Regular	Anne Robinson
9 April 2010	Regular	Rufus Hound
4 June 2010	Regular	Rufus Hound
8 July 2010	Regular	Rufus Hound
14 August 2010	Regular	Rufus Hound
4 September 2010	Regular	Rufus Hound
19 February 2011	Regular	Rufus Hound
