= Auntie's Bloomers =

British TV series (1991–2001)

- Presented by: Terry Wogan
- Country of origin: United Kingdom
- Original language: English
- No. of episodes: 62

Production
- Running time: 10–50 minutes
- Production company: Celador (1991–92)

Original release
- Network: BBC One
- Release: 29 December 1991 – 29 December 2001

Related
- Sporting Bloomers; Outtake TV

Auntie's Bloomers is a blooper show hosted by Terry Wogan that ran from 29 December 1991 to 29 December 2001 and aired on BBC One. Most bloopers consisted of homegrown BBC programmes including soaps, sitcoms, dramas and news.

The programme's title comes from the affectionate nickname "Auntie Beeb" by which the BBC is often referred. The show was replaced by Outtake TV in 2002, a show similar in concept but with slightly less emphasis on BBC-only material.

== Production ==
The first two episodes of the show were made by independent production company Celador. Their contract to produce the show expired after the broadcast of the second episode on 27 December 1992 and was not renewed, leaving the BBC to produce the show themselves from 1994 to 2001.

The shows carried a strong BBC theme, most notably throughout the mid-90s where the set was supposedly the BBC archive, and the opening titles consisted of a mysterious figure entering the BBC Television Centre and retrieving archive footage from a safe.

== Transmissions ==
=== Regular ===
Title	Airdate	Running time
Auntie's Bloomers	29 December 1991	50 minutes
More Auntie's Bloomers	27 December 1992	50 minutes
Auntie's New Bloomers 1	26 December 1994	40 minutes
Auntie's New Bloomers 2	1 January 1995	45 minutes
The Best of Auntie's Bloomers 1	4 April 1995	30 minutes
The Best of Auntie's Bloomers 2	11 April 1995	30 minutes
Auntie's New Bloomers 3	6 September 1995	50 minutes
Auntie's Brand New Bloomers	25 December 1995	45 minutes
Auntie's All-New Christmas Bloomers	25 December 1996	50 minutes
Auntie's All-New Bloomers	31 March 1997	40 minutes
Auntie's Natural Bloomers 1	14 July 1997	30 minutes
Auntie's New Festive Bloomers	25 December 1997	40 minutes
Auntie's New Winter Bloomers	29 December 1997	30 minutes
Auntie's World Cup Bloomers	11 July 1998	35 minutes
Auntie's Bloomers Hall of Blame	31 August 1998	40 minutes
Auntie's Spanking New Christmas Bloomers	25 December 1998	35 minutes
Auntie's Unbelievable New Year Bloomers	2 January 1999	30 minutes
Auntie's Natural Bloomers 2	4 July 1999	30 minutes
Auntie's Cracking New Bloomers	25 December 1999	40 minutes
Auntie's Smashing New Bloomers	1 January 2000	40 minutes
Auntie's Bloomers' Best Bits	5 February 2000	10 minutes
Auntie's EastEnders Birthday Bloomers	12 February 2000	25 minutes
Auntie's Foreign Antics	5 March 2000	30 minutes
Auntie's Hall of Blame 1	29 April 2000	15 minutes
Auntie's Hall of Blame 2	29 April 2000	15 minutes
Auntie's Golden Bloomers	6 May 2000	15 minutes
Auntie's Soccer Showdown Bloomers	10 June 2000	30 minutes
Auntie's Shocking Soccer Bloomers	18 June 2000	30 minutes
Auntie's Sizzling New Summer Bloomers	20 August 2000	40 minutes
Auntie's Olympic Bloomers 1	16 September 2000	30 minutes
Auntie's Olympic Bloomers 2	30 September 2000	30 minutes
Auntie's Sparkling Bloomers	24 December 2000	35 minutes
Auntie's Thermal Bloomers	26 December 2000	30 minutes
Auntie's Hall of Blame	7 April 2001	30 minutes
Auntie's Bloomers Hall of Blame	2 May 2001	25 minutes
New Bursting Bloomers	18 August 2001	40 minutes
Dazzling Bloomers	25 December 2001	30 minutes
Glittering Bloomers	29 December 2001	30 minutes

=== Sporting Bloomers series ===
Series	Start date	End date	Episodes
1	11 July 1995	15 August 1995	5
2	20 June 1996	22 August 1996	8
3	6 June 1997	11 July 1997	6
4	10 June 1999	22 July 1999	6
