= Whaddyado =

- Genre: Educational
- Country of origin: United States
- Original language: English

Production
- Running time: 30 minutes

Original release
- Release: September 12, 2005

Whaddyado is an American syndicated educational television series that began airing on September 12, 2005. The show features people in real-life moral dilemmas and perilous situations to give young viewers a chance to ponder what they would do in the same situation. The show is marketed as E/I-friendly.

The series is produced and distributed by Steve Rotfeld Productions (SRP).

== Reception ==
Common Sense Media rated the show 2 out of 5 stars.
