= Kev Seed =

British radio DJ

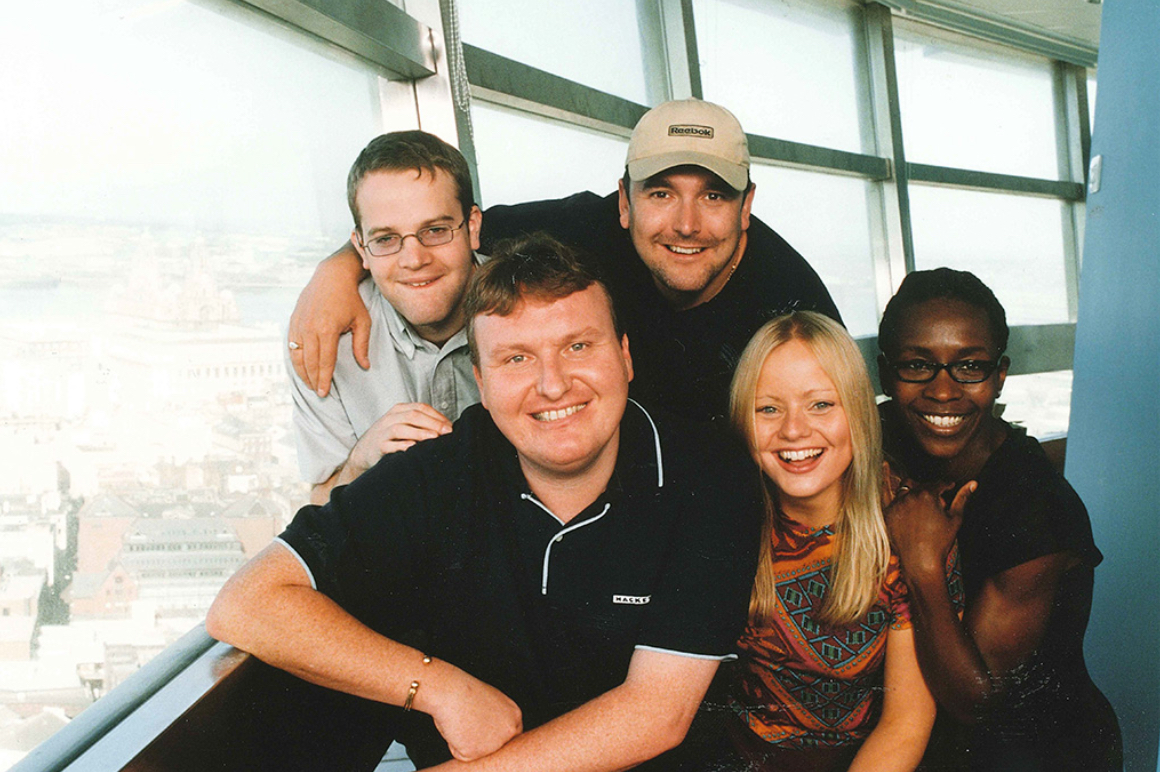
- Seed (front row, left) in a promotional photograph
- Born: Kevin Seed; 27 July 1968 (age 57); Melling, Liverpool, England
- Occupation: Broadcaster
- Years active: 1990–present

Kevin Seed (born 27 July 1968) is an English radio disc jockey. He is most notable for presenting the Radio City Breakfast Show from 1997 to 2008.

== Biography ==
Seed first joined Radio City in 1990. Two years later, he moved to the Preston-based station Rock FM for five years, quickly progressing to becoming the station's breakfast presenter.

In 1997, he re-joined Radio City and presented The Kev Seed Breakfast Show for eleven years.

On 18 July 2000, Seed was the first presenter to broadcast from Radio City's premises at Radio City Tower. He was also a key driver for Radio City winning Sony Radio Awards in 2005 and 2007.

In August 2008, Seed moved to the Drivetime show (4pm–7pm). He presented the early-evening Drivetime show on the Liverpool radio station Radio City 96.7 until October 2008, when he was suspended and then sacked after pleading guilty to a drink-driving charge. Although he appealed, it was reported on 11 November that the station management had upheld their decision. In October 2009, Seed started his new job as the Breakfast Presenter for Wish FM along with shows on Juice FM, the Radio Station for Wigan & St Helens, a year after leaving Radio City. He later presented on 107.6 Juice FM. In 2014, he was the voice of Sainsbury's on various radio stations.

In April 2016, it was announced he would be joining the presenting line-up at Wirral Radio hosting the flagship weekend show.

On 27 July 2020, Seed hosted the first-ever breakfast show at Liverpool Live 24/7.
