= Greatest Hits Radio Lancashire =

- Manchester; United Kingdom
- Broadcast area: Lancashire
- Frequencies: FM: 96.5 MHz (Blackpool); DAB:
- RDS: GRT_HITS
- Branding: The Good Times Sound Like This; Across Lancashire & The North West

Programming
- Format: Classic Hits
- Network: Greatest Hits Radio

Ownership
- Owner: Bauer Media Audio UK
- Sister stations: Hits Radio Lancashire; Hits Radio Liverpool; Greatest Hits Radio Liverpool & The North West

History
- First air date: 5 October 1982
- Former names: Red Rose Radio Red Rose Gold Red Rose 999 Magic 999 Rock FM 2
- Former frequencies: AM: 999 kHz

Links
- Webcast: Online
- Website: planetradio.co.uk/greatest-hits/lancashire/

Greatest Hits Radio Lancashire is an Independent Local Radio station, owned and operated by Bauer Media Audio UK as part of the Greatest Hits Radio network. It broadcasts to Lancashire and North West England.

As of December 2024, the station has a weekly audience of 207,000 listeners according to RAJAR.

== History ==
The radio station launched as Red Rose Radio on 5 October 1982 at 6:00am on 301 metres medium wave (999 kHz) and 97.3 VHF stereo, broadcasting from a converted church (St Paul's) at St. Pauls Square in Preston, Lancashire. The station's first presenter on air was Dave Lincoln - the first record played was "Evergreen" by Barbra Streisand. Other early presenters on the station included Dave Lincoln, Allan Beswick, Sally Moon, Derek Webster, Keith Macklin, Russell Harty and Steve Collins. At this point it was owned by Trans World Communications.

On 1 June 1990, Red Rose Radio split into two stations - the FM service became Red Rose Rock FM (now known as Rock FM, while the AM service became Red Rose Gold playing music from the 1960s to the 1980s, as well as airing other specialist shows. Programming director John Myers hired Colin Lamont, under his on-air pseudonym Scottie McClue, to present the late-night phone-in.

In 1994, Red Rose Gold and Red Rose Rock FM were bought by the Emap group. Towards the mid to late 1990s, Red Rose Gold became Red Rose 999, before morphing into Magic 999 to fall in line with all other Emap-owned AM stations which had all been renamed Magic. Networking at the station was introduced in late 2001 when mid-morning, evening and overnight shows from Magic 105.4 in London begun simulcasting. Towards the end of 2002, listeners were told to contact a special hotline to voice their views about what they think of the station. At around the same time, forthcoming changes to the station were announced such as new programming, a broader music policy and introducing dedicated newsreaders (rather than the local presenters having to be newsreaders, as was the case for a few months). These changes came into effect on Monday 6 January 2003. More locally produced programming was introduced although output from Newcastle, Manchester and Liverpool continued to feature in the station's schedule.

From July 2006, more networking was introduced across the Northern Magic AM network which meant only 4 hours a day was to be presented from the local studios, between 06:00 and 10:00. In April 2012 and in line with the majority of other Magic stations in Northern England, Magic 999 dropped local weekend breakfast shows.

Between March 2013 and December 2014, weekday breakfast was syndicated from Piccadilly Magic 1152 in Manchester. No programming originated from local studios in Preston, apart from local news and traffic bulletins.

On 5 January 2015, Magic 999 was rebranded as Rock FM 2 as part of a revamp of the Bauer network. All programming was to be networked with the other Bauer AM stations in the North, although local news, weather and travel were still broadcast as opt-outs during the day. Despite the station's new name, it did not broadcast on FM.

On 7 January 2019, Rock FM 2 was again rebranded as Greatest Hits Radio.

In February 2021, Bauer announced it would close GHR's medium-wave service on 999 kHz by the end of April 2021. This brought to an end nearly 39 years of broadcasting on the former AM frequency for Red Rose Radio.
