= Dominic Walker (radio presenter) =

Dominic Walker is a radio presenter and stadium announcer from the United Kingdom.

A former student at Winstanley College, Walker used to present the mid morning show on Wire FM, previously presented on the Bauer Big City Network, Key 103, Rock FM and Channel M TV. and on the breakfast show on Wish FM. He has previously worked at various radio stations in England including the Big City Network, Signal 1 and Wire FM. He also had a stint at Radio Napa in Ayia Napa, Cyprus.

Walker has appeared in several cameo roles on stage and screen, including Coronation Street, Emmerdale, and alongside Robson Green in Rhinoceros. He also regularly hosts events, and has appeared alongside 5ive and Steps at Wembley Arena and the MEN Arena.

In 2007 he became the Stadium Announcer at the Halliwell Jones Stadium, home of Warrington Wolves rugby league club, having had previous experience of the role for Liverpool F.C. Reserves and Accrington Stanley, most notably for their FA Cup first-round victory over Huddersfield Town shown live on BBC Match of the Day in 2003.

Since 2008, Walker has hosted the family lounge for Wigan Warriors and has covered as the Stadium Announcer at the DW Stadium. He also hosted Sean O'Loughlin's testimonial game.

Walker has been the stadium announcer at Burnley FC since 2013. As of 2020, he was featured on the FIFA games since FIFA 17 as one of the British announcers at all stadiums in the English Football League. Since 2016 he's been an Executive Lounge MC for Liverpool Football Club.

Now he is re-training to be a solicitor with JMW Solicitors based in Manchester.

Walker has set up the Inside Man YouTube channel providing legal advice.
