= Greatest Hits Radio Liverpool & The North West =

Coordinates: 53.4062°N 2.9819°W

- Liverpool; England
- Broadcast area: Merseyside, Cheshire and South West Lancashire
- Frequencies: FM: 105.9 MHz (Liverpool); FM: 107.2 MHz (Widnes, Runcorn, Warrington); DAB: 10C
- RDS: Grt Hits
- Branding: The Good Times Sound Like This; Across Liverpool & The North West

Programming
- Format: Classic Hits
- Network: Greatest Hits Radio

Ownership
- Owner: Bauer Media Audio UK
- Sister stations: Hits Radio Liverpool; Hits Radio Lancashire; Greatest Hits Radio Lancashire

History
- First air date: 17 March 1997 (as Magic 1548)
- Former names: Radio City Gold; Magic 1548; Radio City 2
- Former frequencies: AM: 1548 kHz

Technical information
- Licensing authority: Ofcom

Links
- Webcast: Rayo
- Website: Greatest Hits Radio Liverpool & The North West

Greatest Hits Radio Liverpool & The North West is an Independent Local Radio station based in Liverpool, England, owned and operated by Bauer Media Audio UK as part of the Greatest Hits Radio network. It broadcasts to Merseyside, Cheshire and South West Lancashire. The station forms part of Greatest Hits Radio North West.

As of December 2024, the station has a weekly audience of 331,000 listeners according to RAJAR.

== Early history ==
Originally it was known as "1548 City Talk", this service existed between 1989 and 1991 originally between 0700 and 1900 on weekdays. It was not a success, and a "Gold" format of music was introduced as the station initially became "Radio City Gold", and then "City Gold".

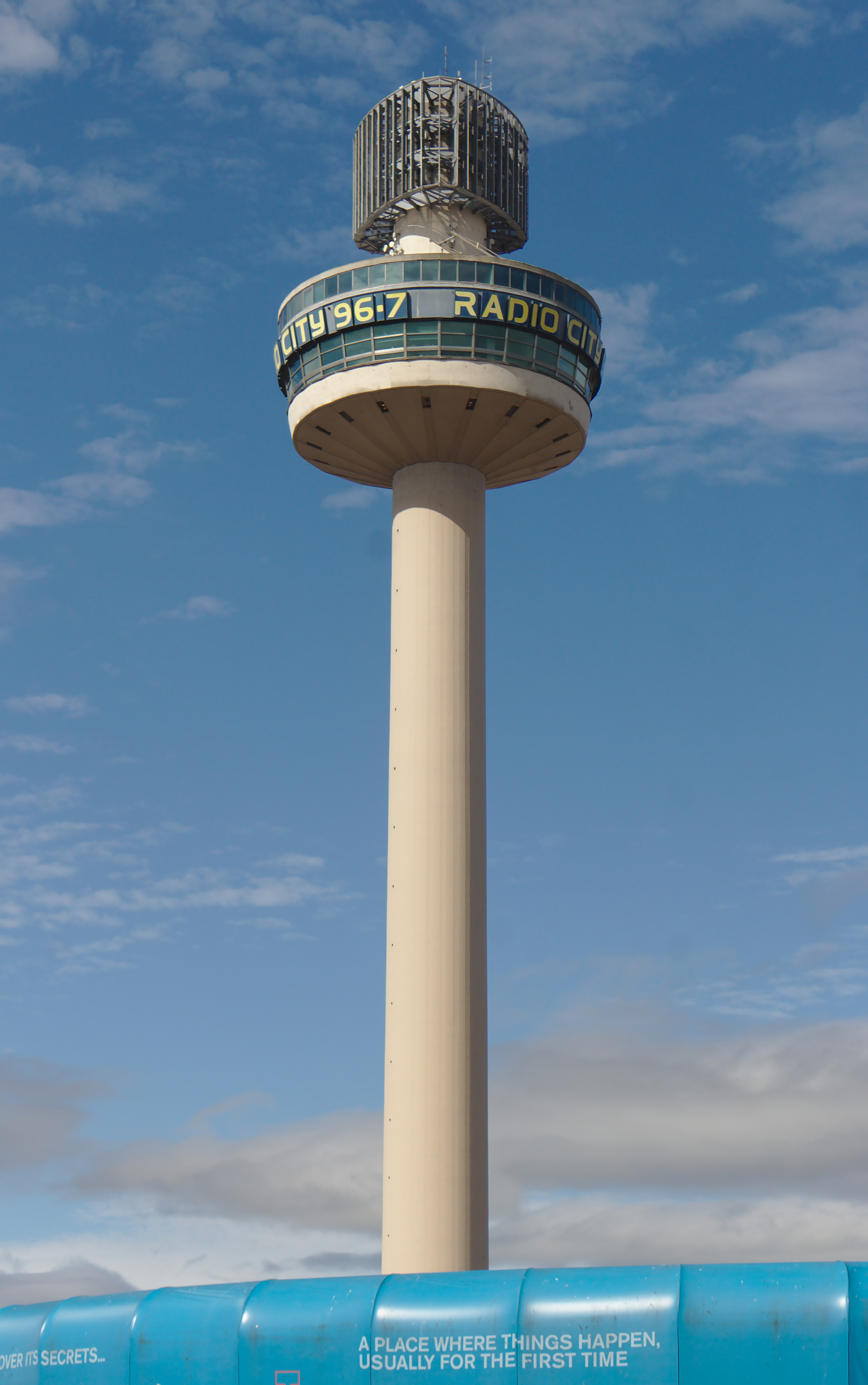
St Johns Beacon. Home to Hits Radio Liverpool and Greatest Hits Radio until December 2024.

Radio City was purchased by EMAP in 1998, and City Gold was rebranded Magic 1548 as part of the network of Magic stations on AM. In December 2001, EMAP decided that it was more economical for the Magic network to share off-peak programmes and in line with the other Magic AM stations began networking between 10am-2pm, 7pm-10am, and then 2am-6am (because of Pete Price's phone-in, which switched stations in January 2006). This resulted in Magic 1548 having more local programming on weekdays. During these hours it was simply known as Magic, although there were local commercial breaks, and local news on the hour.

In January 2003, the station ceased networking with the London station, Magic 105.4, and a regional network was created with Piccadilly Magic 1152 in Manchester at the hub at the weekend and Magic 1152 in Newcastle during the week. During networked hours, local adverts are aired, as well as a local news summary on the hour.

From July 2006, more networking was introduced across the Northern Magic AM network which meant only 4 hours a day was to be presented from the local studios, between 06:00 and 10:00am. In April 2012 Magic 1548, inline with the majority of other Magic North stations, dropped local weekend breakfast shows.

Between March 2013 and December 2014, weekday breakfast was syndicated from Piccadilly Magic 1152 in Manchester.

=== Radio City 2 ===
Magic 1548 was rebranded as Radio City 2 in January 2015, as part of the launch of Bauer's City 2 network. Along with the rebranding, local news and traffic bulletins were reintroduced.

In July 2015, Bauer submitted a formal request to OFCOM to swap Radio City 2's format and frequencies with that of Radio City Talk. The company proposed to reintroduce local breakfast and drive time programming to the station and an enhanced local news service, alongside programming provided by the City 2 network. The request was approved three months later and the switchover took place on Monday 7 December 2015.

=== Greatest Hits Radio ===
On 7 January 2019, Radio City 2 rebranded as Greatest Hits Radio Liverpool & The North West.

On 1 September 2020, the station was merged with several local radio stations to form a new regional station, Greatest Hits Radio North West, as part of an expansion of the Bauer network.

The national weekday breakfast show was broadcast from Bauer's Liverpool studios at St Johns Beacon until December 2024, when programming was moved to Bauer's Manchester network centre.

After Wire FM closed down, GHR Liverpool & The North West inherited the 107.2 MHz FM frequency.

== Programming ==
Networked programming originates from Bauer's London, Manchester and Edinburgh studios.

=== News ===
Bauer's Manchester newsroom broadcasts local news bulletins for Liverpool hourly from 6am-7pm on weekdays, and from 7am-1pm on Saturdays and Sundays. Headlines are broadcast on the half hour during weekday breakfast and drivetime shows, alongside traffic bulletins.

National bulletins from Sky News Radio are carried overnight with bespoke networked bulletins on weekend afternoons, originating from Bauer's Manchester newsroom.
