= Dominic Walker =

Dominic Walker may refer to:

- Dominic Walker (radio presenter), British radio presenter
- Dominic Walker (bishop) (born 1948), Bishop of Monmouth
- Dominic Walker (actor) in The Power of One (film)
