= Greatest Hits Radio North West =

Regional Radio network

- Manchester and Liverpool; United Kingdom
- Broadcast area: North West England; North Wales
- Frequencies: FM: 96.2 MHz (Greater Manchester); 96.4 MHz (Congleton and Macclesfield); 96.5 MHz (Blackpool); 102.4 MHz (Wigan and St Helens); 104.9 MHz (Stockport); 105.9 MHz (Liverpool, Chester and The Wirral); 107.2 MHz (Warrington, Widnes and Runcorn); 107.4 MHz (Bolton and Bury); DAB: 10C (Liverpool, Wigan, Rhyl and Wrexham), 11B (Cumbria), 12A (Lancashire), 12C (Manchester)
- RDS: GRT_HITS

Programming
- Format: Classic Hits
- Network: Greatest Hits Radio

Ownership
- Owner: Bauer Media Audio UK

History
- First air date: 1 September 2020

Links
- Website: GHR Manchester & The North West; GHR Liverpool & The North West; GHR Lancashire; GHR Cumbria & South West Scotland; GHR Wigan & St Helens

Greatest Hits Radio North West is a regional radio network serving North West England and North Wales, as part of Bauer's Greatest Hits Radio network.

== Stations ==
Under relaxed OFCOM requirements for local content on commercial radio, GHR North West is permitted to share all programmes between seven licences located in the ITV Granada broadcast region.

Previously, these licences broadcast as separate stations:

- Piccadilly Radio began broadcasting to Greater Manchester on 2 April 1974.
- Radio City began broadcasting to Merseyside and parts of Cheshire and North Wales on 21 October 1974.
- Red Rose Radio began broadcasting to Central Lancashire on 5 October 1982.
- Radio Wave began broadcasting to Blackpool and The Fylde on 25 May 1992.
- Wish FM began broadcasting to the Wigan and St Helens areas on 1 April 1997.
- Wire FM began broadcasting to the Warrington, Widnes and Runcorn areas on 1 September 1998.
- Tower FM began broadcasting to the Bolton and Bury areas on 20 March 1999.
- The Revolution began broadcasting to the Oldham, Rochdale and Tameside areas on 30 August 1999.
- CFM began broadcasting to Cumbria and South West Scotland on 14 April 1993.

== History ==
Radio City initially ran a single service on AM and FM, but by 1989, it launched a separate daytime talk service on AM, City Talk. However, poor ratings saw the station revert to a classic hits format, Radio City Gold, two years later.

By 1998, Radio City Gold fell into the ownership of Emap, who rebranded the station as Magic 1548, which would adopt an increasing amount of networked programming until its local breakfast show was axed in March 2013.

Tower FM, Wish FM and Wire FM would become part of The Wireless Group, which was brought in 2005 by UTV Media, before being sold again to News Corp in 2016. These three stations co-located to studios in the Orrell area of Wigan in 2009, while maintaining separate identities and local programming.

In 2008, the Magic stations in the North West were sold to Bauer, who would launch the Greatest Hits ('Bauer City 2') network under local branding in January 2015. The following December, Radio City 2 swapped frequencies with sister station Radio City Talk on 105.9 FM and reintroduced local programming at peak times.

In January 2019, Greatest Hits Radio replaced the localised Bauer City 2 branding. The following month, the Wireless Group's network of local radio stations - including Tower, Wish and Wire - were sold to Bauer Radio, although this sale was only ratified in March 2020 following an inquiry by the Competition and Markets Authority.

In May 2020, Bauer announced the Wireless Group stations would rebrand and join the Greatest Hits Radio network. Two months later, Tower, Wish and Wire entered a transition period - carrying local breakfast shows and voicetracked programming ahead of the full relaunch on 1 September 2020. The former Wireless Group studios in Orrell, Wigan were closed, although local newsgathering and sales staff were retained.

As of November 2020, following Bauer's purchase of The Revolution, GHR is also broadcast on 96.2 FM from a transmitter in Oldham which serves much of East and Central Greater Manchester.

In February 2021, Bauer announced it would close GHR's medium-wave frequencies in Manchester (1152 kHz) and Lancashire (999 kHz) by the end of April 2021.

On 29 November 2022, Bauer announced that CFM which broadcasts to Cumbria and South West Scotland will be rebranding and joining the Greatest Hits Radio network in April 2023. It will have a local afternoon show between 1pm-4pm presented by Robbie Dee, and will take the networked shows for the remainder of the time.

== Programming ==
Greatest Hits Radio produces and broadcasts networked programming from Bauer's Manchester and Liverpool studios, including breakfast and evening shows on weekdays. Other output originates from Bauer's studios in Birmingham, Glasgow and London.

On weekdays, the station airs a regional three-hour afternoon show from 1-4pm presented by Andy Goulding. However, the show also airs in London, the North East and Teesside and on the national DAB station.

=== News ===
Bauer's Manchester newsroom broadcasts local news bulletins hourly from 6am to 7pm on weekdays and from 7am to 1pm at weekends. Headlines are broadcast on the half-hour during weekday breakfast and drivetime shows, alongside traffic bulletins.

Separate local news and traffic bulletins air for Greater Manchester, Merseyside, Lancashire and the Wigan & St Helens area.

National bulletins from Sky News Radio are carried at other times.
