= Pete Price =

British radio presenter

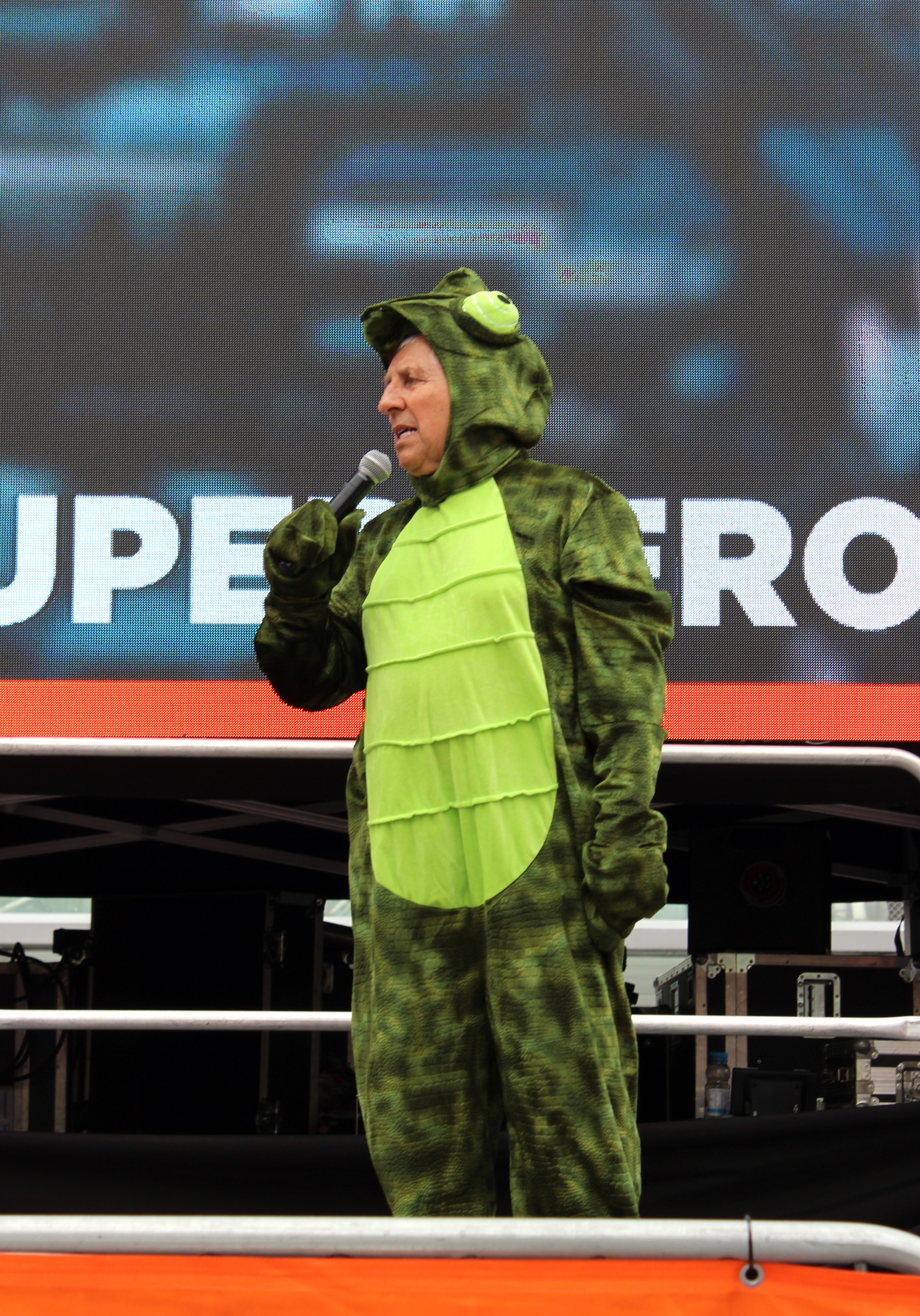
- Price in May 2018
- Born: Peter Lloyd Price; 25 January 1946 (age 80); Wrexham, Wales
- Occupation: Broadcaster
- Years active: 1967–present
- Website: peteprice.com

Peter Lloyd Price (born 25 January 1946) is a British radio personality best known for his work in Liverpool and across Merseyside. He hosted the Sunday night talk radio show Pete Price: Unzipped, which was broadcast across Liverpool sister stations Radio City and Radio City Talk. The show aired live from 10 pm to 2 am and followed an open forum format. He also had a weeknight phone-in, Late Night City, which aired live between 10 pm and 2 am from Monday to Thursday and was simulcast on Radio City Talk and Radio City 2. In 2017, he announced that he was cutting back his show from five nights a week to just Sunday night. From 2017 to 2020, he hosted Pete Price's Sunday Best from 10 pm to 1 am every Sunday, where his weekly phone-in guest was Paul McCartney's stepmother Angie, who lives in Los Angeles and provided Hollywood gossip. Price now broadcasts on In Demand Decades every Sunday night at 10 pm till 1 am.

As a comedian, Price was a winner on the ITV talent show New Faces. He is also an author, patron, and artist for Claire House Children's Hospice and a columnist for the Liverpool Echo. He is openly gay, which is often the subject of prank calls to his radio show, as is the fact that he is dyslexic and has trouble reading text messages or emails on air. To complement his radio show, he also gives out a personal phone number for listeners to talk to him in confidence.

== Early life ==
Peter Lloyd Price was born in Wrexham on 25 January 1946. He was adopted at approximately three months old, in April 1946, by Hilda Sandra Price and David William Lloyd. He was raised in West Kirby, Cheshire. He was notably closer to his mother than his father, who repeatedly was violent towards Price's mother. When he was 12, he came to terms with his homosexuality, but his doctor told him he would "grow out of it". Two years later, he went back to the same doctor, only to be prescribed Valium. A combination of his homosexuality, problems with school, and problems in his social life put him into a state of despair; at the age of 14, he attempted to overdose on child-strength aspirin, only to wake up the next morning.

At the age of 15, Price was working as a hairdresser at the weekend while studying cookery at Birkenhead Technical College. He began working for a wealthy local family, catering for their dinner parties, and became a close family friend. He soon got a professional catering job, a summer at the Cavendish Hotel in Eastbourne and went on to manage a Fullers Tea Shop in Worthing. He was sent to an institution in Chester to receive aversion therapy when he came out to his mother at the age of 18. He left after one day after being exposed to people being "treated" using electrodes. A few days later, he recognised one of the psychiatrists from the institution in a gay bar. In 1993, after stories had emerged of others being treated this way in hospitals, he decided to go public with his story to encourage more people to come forward.

== Radio career ==
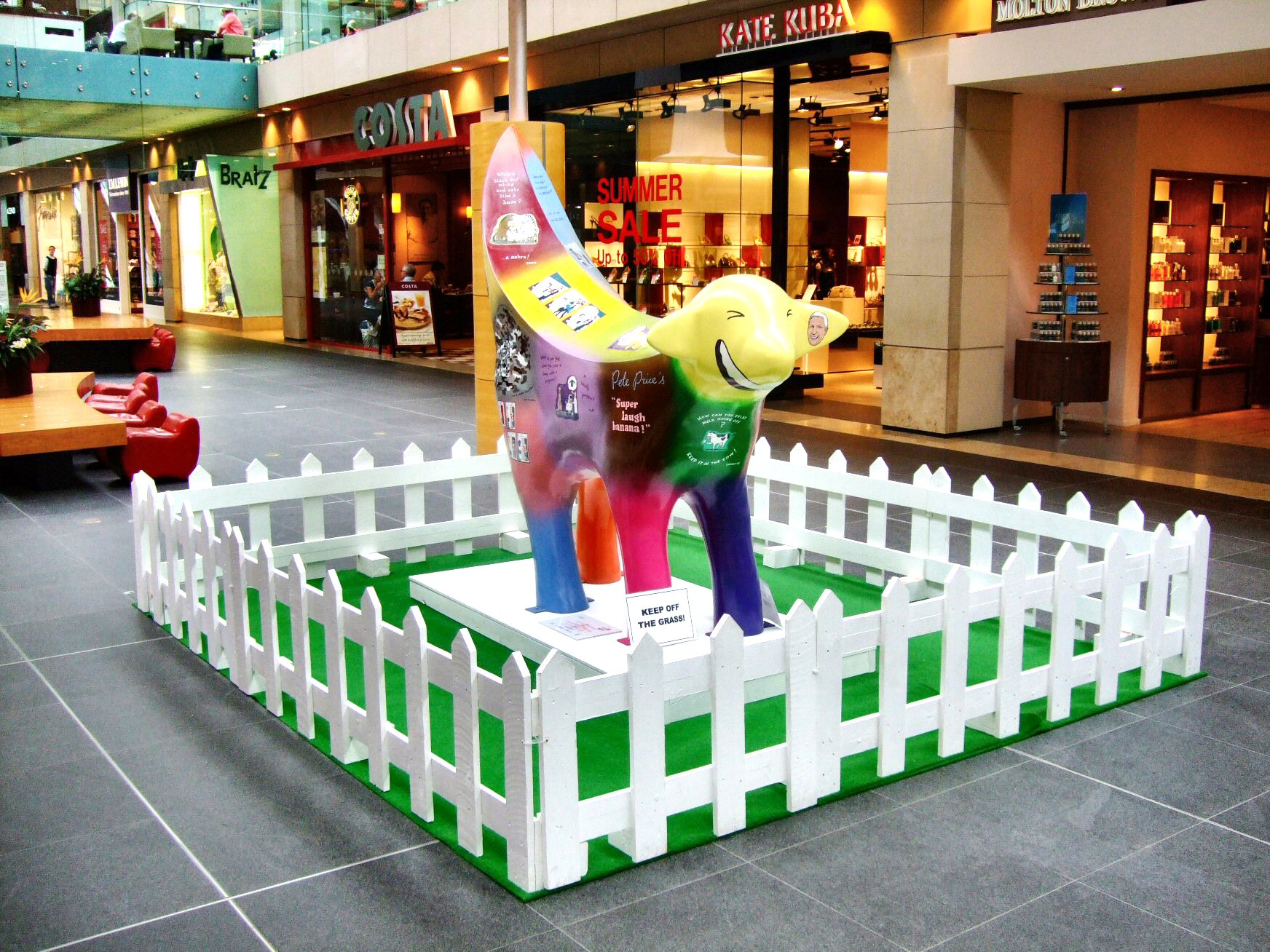
Pete Price's Superlambanana

After several years as the cook on a cruise ship, he became a disc jockey for BBC Radio Merseyside at the age of twenty-one. Shortly after, Price made his first appearance on the comedy scene at Liverpool's 'The Shakespeare', working at various venues which include The Palladium and the QE2. In the 1980s, he became a presenter on his former station's rival, 194 Radio City, and has remained so in its various incarnations since. He continues to star in pantomimes in Liverpool and Merseyside, as well as working for national newspapers including The Independent and The Times. As a broadcaster he has worked with national BBC Radio 1 and Radio City for over 20 years, and continued to host his late night talk show on Radio City Talk until March 2020. The programme was also carried by sister station Greatest Hits Radio Liverpool.

In April 2009, Price was made an 'Honorary Scouser' by the Lord Mayor of Liverpool.

=== Current shows ===
Price's recent shows were originally broadcast on Magic Radio, until it garnered mass attention following controversies with callers on air. The show was broadcast over Radio City 96.7 and City Talk 105.9 on Sun-Thurs nights. This was until July 2014 when City started to join up with the rest of the Bauer Media stations late night show with Kate Lawler.

Price presented a live phone-in programme which was broadcast on Radio City Talk . Guests have included Dennis the Chemist, and Pheobe, an alleged psychic and Angel Card reader. The programme was one of the most popular night-time talk shows in the UK, with one show recently attracting 19,000 attempted calls.

In May 2020, following the announcement of Radio City Talk's planned closure, it was also confirmed that Price would lose his weekly phone-in programme. Price reacted by saying he was "devastated" by the news.

=== Notable incidents ===
Pete was praised for abandoning his midweek show on one occasion in February 2004 to go to the aid of a 13-year-old caller who was threatening to kill himself.

In January 2006, Pete's show on sister station Magic 1548 hit the headlines in Liverpool when a regular caller known as "Terry" stopped responding live on air during a debate. After Merseyside Police refused to check on the man's safety, Pete again abandoned the show (music was played after he left the St. John's Beacon studios) to travel to the man's home. Unfortunately, as he arrived, Pete saw an ambulance outside the house. Concerned listeners had already gained entry into the man's home and found that he had died from a suspected heart attack. Soon after this, the Monday-Thursday show left Magic 1548 and was moved to Radio City 96.7's late night phone-in.

Also in September 2007, an extract from his autobiography was published in the Liverpool Echo, which revealed that Price had abused cocaine, although he "handed himself in" to the police shortly after through shame.

In October 2007, it was reported by the Liverpool Echo that Price had received a "homophobic" death threat via text live on air. The sender was arrested shortly afterwards when police were contacted immediately after the receipt of the threatening text. They also reported that "on another occasion, a man tried to break into Radio City's headquarters, because he had become convinced Price had tried to kill John Lennon"

In January 2008 Pete tried to find his natural father by using the networking skills of an imprisoned Sicilian Mafia boss Bernardo Provenzano in the hope that "The Don" can help him trace his dad. His biological mother, upon restoring contact with him, gave him a photograph of his biological father: a Sicilian prisoner of war held near Warrington. Pete himself said that the Mafia "must have the best information network in the world".

== Writer ==
In September 2007, Price released an autobiography (co-written by Adrian Butler), Pete Price: Namedropper topped Liverpool best seller charts within its first few days of sale, and was serialised in the Liverpool Echo.

He often jokes about releasing a second autobiography entitled The Bitch is Back. This autobiography, to be published on the day of his death, he says, would contain a list of all the men he has slept with.
