= Derek Webster (radio presenter) =

English radio presenter, producer, and music scheduler

Derek Webster is a British Radio Presenter and Producer . He was born in Whiston Hospital on Merseyside and raised in Widnes.

He presents on Boom Radio, a UK music-based radio station, and on Boom Radio's sister station Boom Light.

== Education ==
He studied journalism with the University of Lancaster, and a Postgraduate Certificate in Education at the University of Central Lancashire.

== Career ==
Derek Webster presented as a volunteer at Whiston Hospital Radio from 1977, learning presentation and production skills. Along with friends David Howard and Paul Loney he wrote and produced the children's radio serial Captain Flash which was broadcast on the popular Billy Butler morning show on BBC Radio Merseyside in 1978.

Derek Webster's first professional radio job was as a presenter at Red Rose Radio in Lancashire from 1982 until 1990; he presented late nights and then the Early Show, before moving to mid mornings on Red Rose Gold 999AM in 1990. Also presenting live daily travel reports from an aeroplane flying out of Blackpool Airport.

He was then a presenter at Radio City Gold, which was a sister station to Radio City in Liverpool, where he presented the breakfast show in 1993.

In 1994 Derek joined the launch team at North West regional station Jazz FM as Head Of Music and presenting a daily show.

Derek returned to Lancashire's Red Rose Gold 999AM in 1995 as Head Of Presentation and presenter of the mid morning show from 1995 to 1997, when he joined 96.9 The Bay in Lancaster, presenting mid mornings.

Derek presented the mid morning show and was Head Of Music at North West of England regional station Century 105 from its launch in 1998. He said that at the station's launch working with John Myers, "[i]t felt like I was in ‘Pirates Of The Caribbean’ at the start of another big adventure." In 1999, he was still presenting at the station.

In 2000 Derek joined the launch team at East Lancashire radio station 2BR where he presented the breakfast show.

In 2004, Derek joined 100.4 Smooth Radio, now known as Smooth Radio North West,; His show on 100.4 Smooth Radio started at 6pm.

He presented a weekday overnight show nationally on Smooth Radio, finishing in 2013.

From 2013 until 2014, Derek presented a Sunday evening programme on BBC Radio Cumbria. He has sat in for other presenters on BBC Local Radio including BBC Radio Lancashire and BBC Radio York.

Derek Webster co-produced with Ashley Byrne a BBC Radio 2 documentary series, The Story of the Light, about the BBC's Light Programme, which was broadcast in 2017.

In 2020, Derek Webster was teaching students how to make radio content at Burnley College. where he ran the student radio station. Also in 2020, he began presenting travel news bulletins for the company Radio Travel News.

In 2021 Derek Webster joined the team at Boom Radio , a radio station which is music-based and aimed at the Baby Boom generation, He currently presents on four weekday mornings per week from midnight until 2am. Also on Boom Radio's sister station Boom Light weekdays from 9am until midday, where he manages the day to day running of the station. Boom Radio is receivable in most places in the United Kingdom on DAB+. In 2022, Webster was featured in Great British Life magazine as a famous person residing in Hebden Bridge, West Yorkshire.

Derek Webster has interviewed many famous people at Southport Theatre, and in 2017 a special programme was broadcast on Sandgrounder Radio, at which Webster was working at the time, which looked at Webster's interviews at the theatre.

== Personal life ==
Derek has lived in Hebden Bridge, West Yorkshire since 2012.
