= Ackhurst Hall =

Listed building in Orrell, Greater Manchester, England

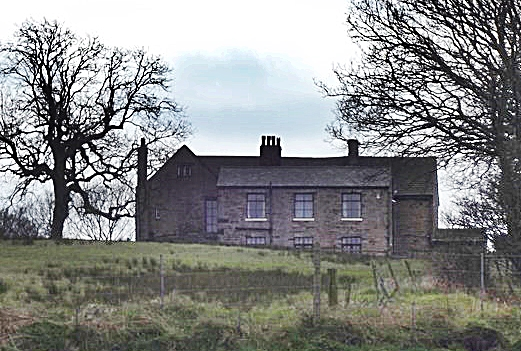
- Ackhurst Hall in 2012

- Location within Greater Manchester

General information
- Location: Ackhurst Lane, Orrell, Greater Manchester, England
- Coordinates: 53.5564°N 2.6876°W
- Year built: 1686; 340 years ago
- Renovated: 19th century (extended)

Listed Building – Grade II*
- Official name: Ackhurst Hall
- Designated: 30 March 1966
- Reference no.: 1228341

Listed Building – Grade II
- Official name: Sundial approximately 5 metres south of Ackhurst Hall
- Designated: 10 May 1988
- Reference no.: 1228342

Ackhurst Hall is a Grade II* listed building on Ackhurst Lane in Orrell, a suburb of Wigan, Greater Manchester, England. Historically in Lancashire, it developed from a farmhouse with datestones of 1618 and 1686, was extended in the 19th century, and has long associations with local gentry and Catholic recusants. Designated in 1966 for its architectural and historic interest, it remains a private residence.

== History ==
Ackhurst Hall originated as a farmhouse in the 17th century, with evidence of earlier features such as a fireplace dated 1618 and a datestone inscribed "1686". These details suggest that the building was constructed during the late 17th century, possibly incorporating earlier elements. The hall was later extended in the 19th century, reflecting changes in domestic architecture and the growing prosperity of its occupants.

The property has historical associations with local gentry and Catholic recusants. The attic was reportedly used for the celebration of Mass during periods of religious tension, indicating its role in the region's social and religious history.

In December 1868, a child was murdered near the hall, an incident that was widely reported at the time and remains unsolved. The case occurred close to the property but was not directly connected with its occupants.

On 30 March 1966, Ackhurst Hall was designated a Grade II* listed building for its architectural and historic significance. The hall is currently in use as a private residence and is not open to the public.

== Architecture ==
The building is constructed of sandstone with a stone-slate roof and follows a traditional two-storey plan with an attic. The main elevation consists of four bays, with the second and fourth bays projecting under gables. A porch in the second bay contains a round-headed entrance and retains its original studded door. Most windows are hollow-chamfered mullioned and transomed, with continuous drip moulds on the ground floor and label moulds on the first floor. A timber canted bay window is present in the fourth bay, and the attic includes a small blocked two-light window.

The rear of the building features a gabled bay with mullioned windows and a three-bay 19th-century extension fitted with casements. Internally, the hall retains timber-framed partition walls with wattle and daub infill, two fireplaces with ovolo-moulded openings and inset Tudor heads, and a spiral timber staircase leading to the attic. The roof structure includes collar trusses, one with a turned king post and ovolo-moulded principal rafters. Original doors with bolection moulding and period ironwork also survive.

== Setting and features ==
The hall stands in a semi-rural position on the southern slope of the Douglas Valley, near Gathurst station. A 17th-century sundial, listed at Grade II, is located in front of the hall. It consists of a stone baluster on a round plinth with two steps, although its flat top is not original.

== See also ==
- Grade II* listed buildings in Greater Manchester
- Listed buildings in Orrell, Greater Manchester
