= 107.4 FM =

FM radio frequency

This is a list of radio stations that broadcast on FM frequency 107.4 MHz:

== United Kingdom ==
- Easy Radio South Coast (Portsmouth frequency)
- Greatest Hits Radio Berkshire & North Hampshire (Hungerford frequency)
- Greatest Hits Radio Black Country & Shropshire (Telford frequency)
- Greatest Hits Radio Bolton & Bury
- Greatest Hits Radio Somerset (Bridgwater frequency)
- Smooth East Midlands (Kettering frequency)
