= Allan Beswick =

British radio broadcaster (born 1948)

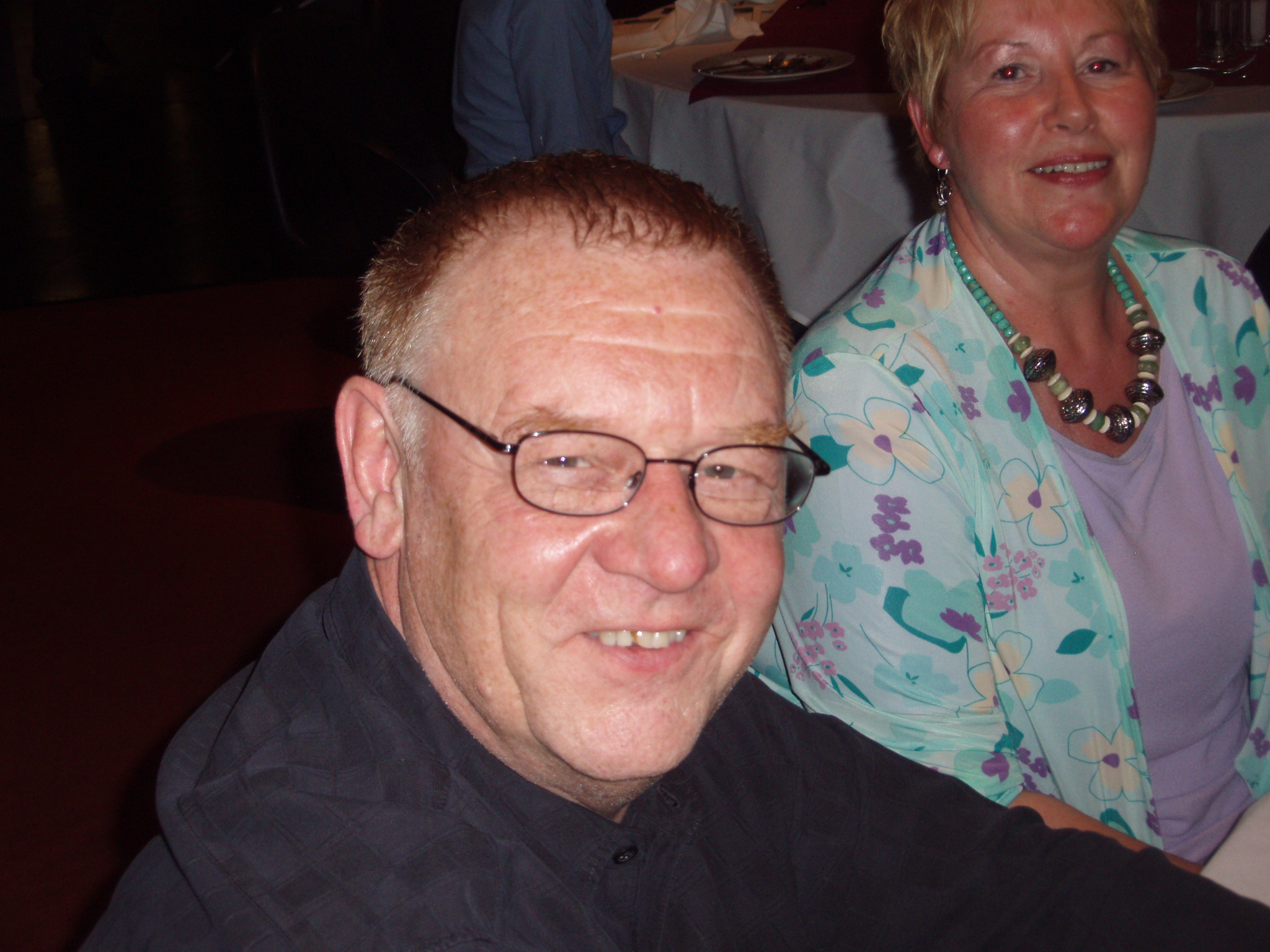
- Allan Beswick in 2010
- Born: 8 October 1948 (age 77); Warrington, Lancashire, England
- Career
- Stations: BBC Radio Manchester; BBC Radio Merseyside; BBC Radio Lancashire
- Stations: Prev: Red Rose Radio, Metro Radio, BBC Radio 5 Live
- Style: Radio broadcaster
- Country: United Kingdom

Allan Beswick (born 8 October 1948 in Warrington, Lancashire) is a retired radio broadcaster who is best known for his popular phone-in programmes on BBC Radio Manchester, BBC Radio Merseyside, BBC Radio Lancashire and Red Rose Radio.

Before starting his late-night phone show on the BBC, Beswick presented the breakfast show on BBC Radio Manchester.

== Career ==
Prior to becoming a radio presenter, Beswick worked as a soldier, a bus driver, a driving instructor and a mental health nurse and for the Citizen's Advice Bureau; during his time at the C.A.B. he began to appear as a guest on Dave Lincoln and Friends, a programme on Radio City in Liverpool.

In the early to late eighties, he worked for Lancashire station Red Rose Radio where he initially presented an afternoon show which won him a Sony national radio award. He then presented a late-night phone-in The Allan Beswick Late Night Show. which drew listeners and controversy in nearly equal measure. His listening figures for this late night slot often drew audiences equal to those of many radio stations breakfast shows. The overall 'audience reach' of the programme drew in the region of 100,000 listeners per night, but a total listenership across the North West, West Yorkshire and North Wales often approached 500,000 listeners.

The show 'or programme' as he referred to it, drew comparisons with similar northern based late night phone in shows with James Whale at Red Rose Radio's sister station Radio Aire in Leeds, James H Reeve and James Stannage at Piccadilly Radio in Manchester.

During his time at Red Rose Radio, Beswick also hosted a Sunday morning call in game show called 'It's Your Turn.' His assistant was credited as Wobbly Warren. Allan occasionally took his show to live venues throughout the Red Rose area, mainly in Lancashire and on Merseyside.

An on-air incident led to his being banned for a period by the Independent Broadcasting Authority for being abusive to a caller. Red Rose held a ballot to see if he should be re-instated, which he subsequently was. This second coming lasted about a year. He soon moved to BBC Radio Manchester where he presented a lunchtime show, the morning show and later the breakfast show, moving back to his familiar late night spot in early 2015. In April 2007 a humorous comment Beswick made about the death of Alan Ball on a lunchtime broadcast drew complaints, resulting in an apology both from the BBC and Beswick himself.

Beswick has also worked on Metro Radio in the North East of England and BBC Radio 5 Live, presenting late night sporadically in the early part of the last decade, and on television, including a slot as presenter of "Beswick's Beat", a local current affairs segment on North West Tonight.

In November 2008, Beswick presented Salt City, a documentary about Winsford Mine, on BBC Radio 4.

On 2 February 2015, Allan took over the networked late show on both BBC Radio Manchester and BBC Radio Lancashire.

Beswick was on air during the Manchester Arena bombing on 22 May 2017, taking calls from eyewitnesses; the show was specially extended until 5am.

In May 2021, it was announced that Beswick's late show would be moving to weekends only. In addition to BBC stations Radio Lancashire and Manchester, the new show also airs on Radio Merseyside. Beswick presented his last programme on the three stations in the early hours of the morning on 8 October 2023, during which he also announced his retirement from radio broadcasting.

Beswick has previously hosted ‘an evening with’ tour, sharing stories from his broadcasting career.
