= Tower FM =

Coordinates: 53.5384°N 2.6949°W

Greatest Hits Radio Bolton & Bury
- Wigan; England
- Broadcast area: Bolton and Bury
- Frequency: FM: 107.4 MHz

Programming
- Format: Classic Hits
- Network: Greatest Hits Radio

Ownership
- Owner: Bauer

History
- First air date: 20 March 1999
- Former names: Tower FM

Links
- Website: Greatest Hits Radio

Greatest Hits Radio Bolton & Bury (formerly Tower FM) is an Independent Local Radio station serving the Bolton and Bury areas of Greater Manchester.

Following its sale to Bauer Radio, the station was closed and merged with the Greatest Hits Radio network in September 2020.

== Overview ==
Tower FM logo used from 2010 to 2016.

Final logo used from 2016 to 2020.

The radio station was given the name Tower as a local link to both towns in the station's coverage area; Turton Tower near to Bolton and Peel Tower on Holcombe Hill at Ramsbottom near Bury.

Originally an RSL (restricted service licence) radio station, the team behind the project won the full-time licence and the station began broadcasting on 20 March 1999.

As an RSL, Tower FM broadcast from Bury via a link to the transmitter on Peel Tower. The station later moved to Bolton once the main base was established on Gaskell Street.

Both towns served as the main target service area for the station, although it could also be heard in most of Greater Manchester and even parts of Cheshire.

In early 2007, the station's then-owners approached UK media regulator OFCOM to ask permission to move the station's base from Bolton to the Haydock or Newton Le Willows area of Merseyside as part of a plan to co-locate Tower with two other stations from the UTV Media group - Wish FM in Wigan and Wire FM in Warrington.

The original plan was abandoned but from the autumn of 2009, all three stations were based at studios in the Orrell area of Wigan.

== Station rebrand ==
On 8 February 2019, Tower FM and the Wireless Group's local radio stations were sold to Bauer Radio. The sale was ratified in March 2020 following an inquiry by the Competition and Markets Authority.

On 27 May 2020, it was announced that Tower FM will join Bauer's Greatest Hits Radio network.

On 13 July 2020, local programming outside weekday breakfast was replaced by networked output from the GHR network, with Tower FM retaining its own branding.

In September 2020, Tower FM merged with several local stations in the North West of England and North Wales, as Greatest Hits Radio North West. The station's local breakfast show was replaced by a regional drivetime show. Localised news bulletins, traffic updates and advertising were retained. The station's Orrell studios were closed.
