= Phil Easton =

English radio presenter

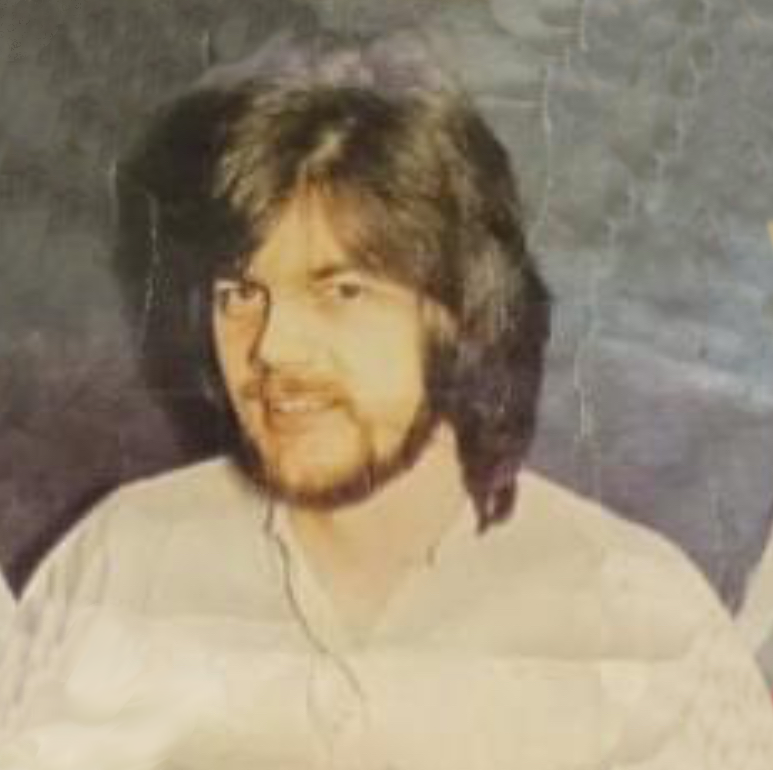
- Born: 8 August 1949; West Lynn, Norfolk, England
- Died: 2 February 2009 (aged 59); Crosby, Merseyside, England
- Monuments: Plaque on The Cavern Club Wall of Fame
- Occupation: Radio Presenter / DJ
- Years active: 1974–2009
- Notable work: The Great Easton Express
- Television: Westward Television
- Spouse: Fran Easton
- Children: 3

Phil Easton (8 August 1949 – 2 February 2009) was an English radio presenter and football announcer, best known for his work at Liverpool's Radio City from 1974 to 2009.

== Career ==
Easton joined Radio City late 1975, and became known for his evening rock show "The Great Easton Express", which ran for 12 years in total on and off. During Easton's career at Radio City he organised "Battle of The Bands". "Battle of the Bands" helping smaller bands find fame.

From the late 1980s to mid 1990s Easton moved away from Radio City to help launch Orchard FM, now known as Heart Somerset. While there he took on several different roles, such as programme controller and head of music. After this period away, he returned to Radio City.

Easton helped to relaunch City Talk in January 2008. He interviewed many famous figures, including the then prime minister Gordon Brown. Following Easton's death, Brown said: "Phil was an accomplished and talented broadcaster who was on the top of his game when we met just a few weeks ago".

As well as working at Radio City, Easton worked as Liverpool F.C.'s match-day announcer from 2000 until his death.
