= St Paul's Church, Preston, Lancashire =

Coordinates: 53.7624°N 2.6941°W

St Paul's Church, Preston
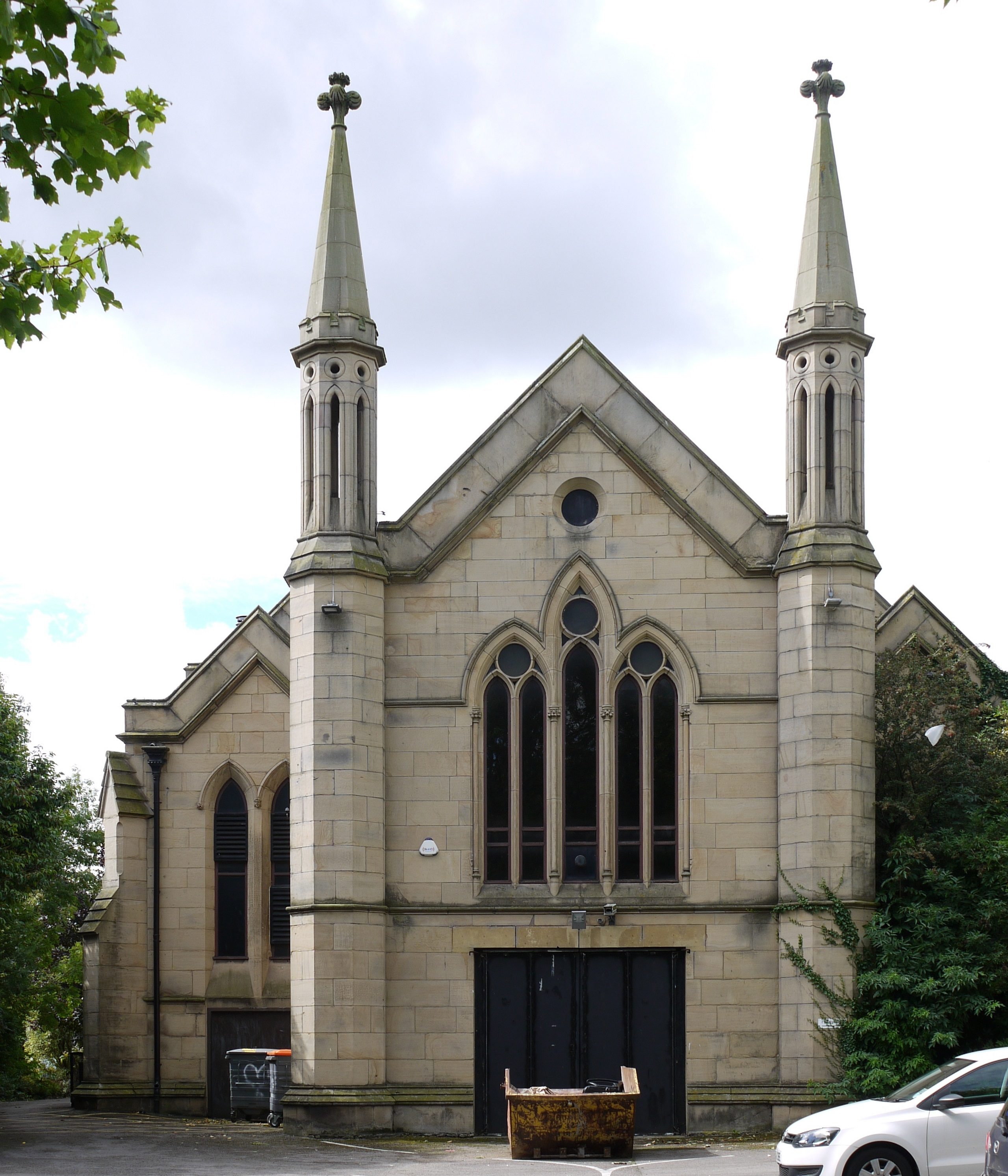

- Location in Preston
- OS grid reference: SD 543,298
- Location: St Paul's Square, Preston, Lancashire
- Country: England
- Denomination: Anglican

History
- Status: Former parish church

Architecture
- Functional status: Redundant
- Heritage designation: Grade II
- Designated: 28 March 1977
- Architect(s): Thomas Rickman and Henry Hutchinson
- Architectural type: Church
- Style: Gothic Revival
- Groundbreaking: 1823
- Completed: 1882
- Construction cost: £6,221
- Closed: 1 January 1979

Specifications
- Materials: Sandstone, tiled roofs

St Paul's Church is a redundant Anglican parish church in St Paul's Square, Preston, Lancashire, England. It is recorded in the National Heritage List for England as a designated Grade II listed building. It was a Commissioners' church, having received a grant towards its construction from the Church Building Commission.

The building was home to radio stations Rock FM and Greatest Hits Radio Lancashire (originally Red Rose Radio) from 1981 to 2020.

== History ==
St Paul's was built between 1823 and 1825, and was designed by Thomas Rickman and Henry Hutchinson. A grant of £6,221 (equivalent to £500,000 in 2025) was given towards its construction by the Church Building Commission. In 1882 a chancel was added to the church, and a baptistery was created within the church, by T. H. Myers. The church was declared redundant on 1 January 1979. In 1981 it was bought for £35,000 by Red Rose Radio who spent £780,000 to convert it into a radio station. The conversion was carried out by Sandy Brown Associates.

== Later use ==
From 1981, the building was used as the studios for Red Rose Radio, which later split into two stations that changed their names several times, eventually becoming Rock FM and Greatest Hits Radio Lancashire.. The radio studios were located on the ground floor, with the offices on the first floor. Bauer Media announced in January 2020 that Rock FM would be relocating to its network centre in Castlefield, Manchester from March 2020.

The building is now used as office space.

== Architecture ==
The former church is constructed in sandstone with a tiled roof. Its architectural style is Early English. The plan consists of a seven-bay nave with full-height aisles, a two-bay chancel and offices. It has a three-span roof. The west end is in three sections; the central section is gabled, and the side sections are smaller with angle buttresses. Octagonal turrets rise at the junctions of the sections. In the lower part of the central section is a three-bay arcade, each arch containing a window. Above the arcade are three stepped lancet windows, over which is a small circular window. The turrets are slim and contain open arcading, and an embattled cap over which is a tall pinnacle with a quatrefoil finial. Each side section contains a tall lancet window. Along the side of the church, the bays are divided by buttresses. The first bays contain a doorway with a window above it, and all the other bays have pairs of lancet windows. At the east end of the church are three stepped lancet windows and pinnacles similar to those at the west end.

== War memorial ==
The parish war memorial stands in the northern corner of the former church's grounds, having been relocated there from its original location nearby due to vandalism. It takes the form of a slim hexagonal column of sandstone, similar to the church, on a small stepped base surmounted by six grouped columns with a Celtic-style cross on the top. Originally it bore metal plates commemorating the men of the parish who lost their lives in World War One (and World War Two?), but these have been removed at some point and their location is unknown.

== See also ==
- Listed buildings in Preston, Lancashire
- List of Commissioners' churches in Northeast and Northwest England
