= Derek Webster =

Derek Webster may refer to:

- Derek Webster (radio presenter), British radio presenter
- Derek Webster, publisher and editor of the Canadian magazine Maisonneuve
- Derek Webster, 1988 mayor of Newcastle upon Tyne
- Derek Webster (writer), candidate for the 2016 Gerald Lampert Award for poetry
- Derek Webster (actor), American film and television actor
- Derek Webster, basketball player; see 2020–21 The Citadel Bulldogs basketball team
