= The Mount, Wigan =

Listed pub in Greater Manchester, England

The Mount
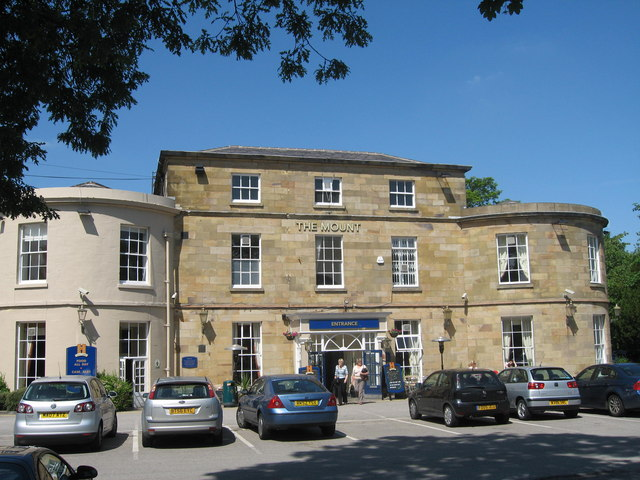
- The pub in 2007

- Location within Greater Manchester

General information
- Type: Public house; originally a house
- Location: Orrell Road, Orrell, Greater Manchester, England
- Coordinates: 53.5394°N 2.6985°W
- Year built: Early 19th century
- Renovated: 1986 (altered)
- Client: John Clarke
- Owner: Greene King

Design and construction
- Designations

Listed Building – Grade II
- Official name: The Mount public house
- Designated: 15 December 1977
- Reference no.: 1228430

Website
- Official website

The Mount is a Grade II listed public house on Orrell Road in Orrell, a suburb of Wigan, Greater Manchester, England. Built in the early 19th century as a house for colliery owner John Clarke, it was later occupied by a community of Benedictine nuns who established a school nearby. The building has carried the name The Mount since at least the mid‑20th century and has traded as a pub since before its listing in 1977. It is now operated as a pub‑restaurant by Hungry Horse, a chain owned by Greene King.

== History ==
The building was constructed in the early 19th century and was originally a house, according to its official listing. It was built for the colliery owner John Clarke. Between 1821 and 1835 the property was occupied by a community of Benedictine nuns, who had left France during the French Revolution. After arriving in Brighton on 18 October 1792, they were given refuge first at Heath in Yorkshire and later at Orrell Mount. The nuns ran a school in a neighbouring building known as The Nunnery, where young women were taught languages and other subjects. They eventually moved from Orrell to Princethorpe in Warwickshire.

The 1893 Ordnance Survey map shows the building without a name or designation in an area called Orrell Mount, a term no longer used on modern maps, while the 1941 edition shows the building divided into two properties and labels both together as The Mount, indicating they were treated as a single address at that time.

On 15 December 1977, The Mount was designated a Grade II listed building, at which time it was in use as a pub. In 1986 the pub underwent internal refurbishment, although the nature of the work was not recorded. As of June 2024, the establishment was operated as a pub-restaurant by Hungry Horse and its freehold was owned by Greene King.

== Architecture ==
The building is constructed of stone, with a later extension finished in stucco, and has hipped roofs. Its main section is three storeys with three bays, flanked by two‑storey wings that curve outward, and another set‑back two‑storey bay on the left. A horizontal band marks the top of the ground floor, and there are projecting mouldings above the first floor and at attic level.

Most of the windows are sash types with glazing bars, although some on the ground floor have been altered. The entrance is a simple open porch, likely added later. The right side has five bays, with the central three projecting slightly and topped by a pediment. A second porch on this side has Tuscan columns, a shaped frieze, and arched openings on the flanks.

== See also ==
- Listed buildings in Orrell, Greater Manchester
- Listed pubs in Greater Manchester
