= Burnley College =

College in Lancashire, England

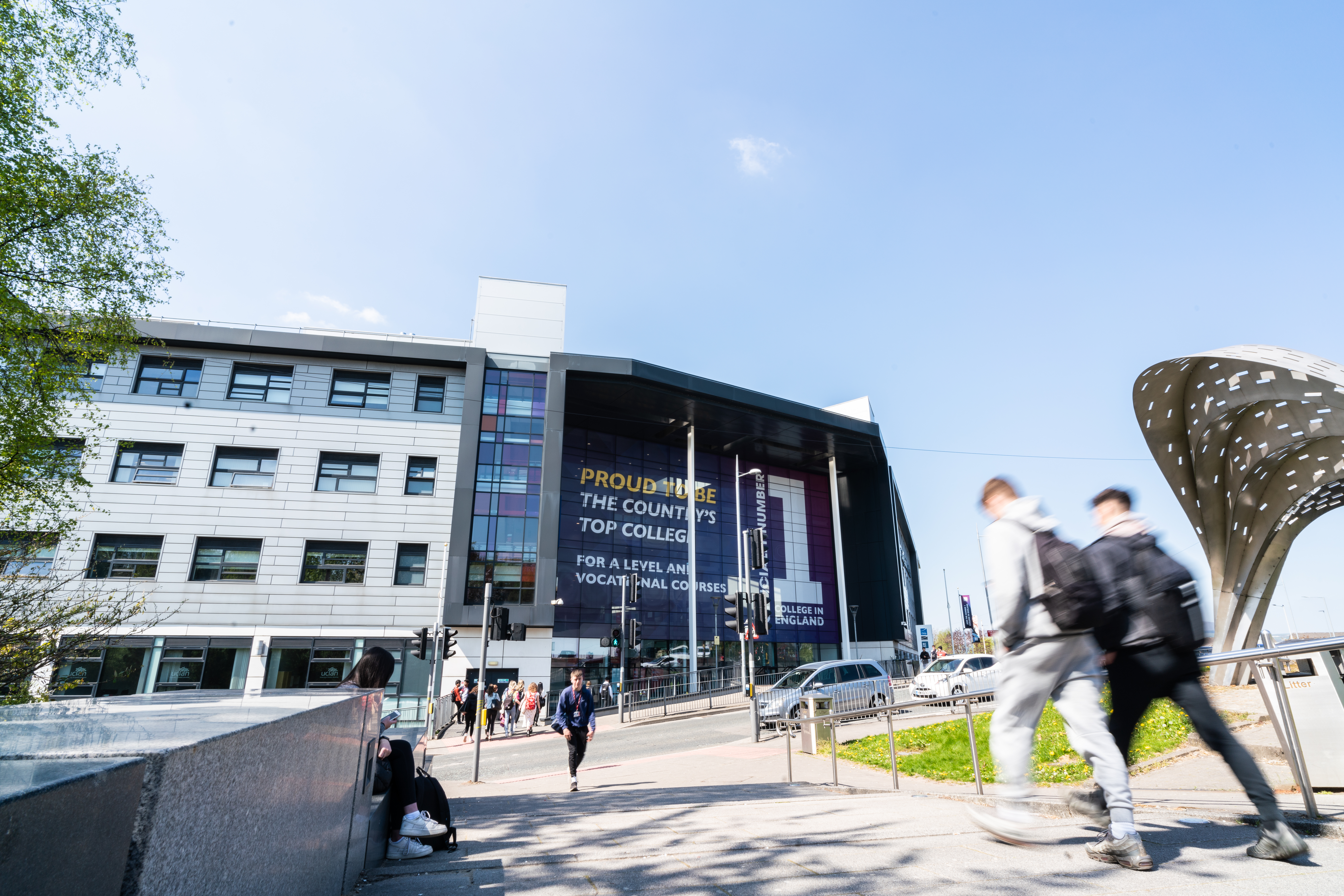

Burnley College is a further education college based in Burnley, Lancashire. It is situated on Princess Way.

The college accommodates for various types of further education, including various A Levels, BTEC Qualifications, Apprenticeships and T Levels. It is open to people of all ages, genders and identities.

== History ==
The college was originally founded in 1834, and owes its history to Burnley Mechanics. The original building was known as the 'Technical Institute', on Ormerod Road, before moving into a new building in 2009.

== Controversies ==
As of June 2025, Principle of 7 years Karen Buchanan resigned from her role as Principle for unknown reasons.

In March 2025, Ofsted accused Burnley College of 'inflating the qualification achievement rates' by providing misleading result data and upper management failing to scrutinise unusually high grades. These inflated rates misled students, stakeholders, parents, and the community surrounding the college. The recent Ofsted report released on 11 March 2025 shows that in individual areas the college excels such as 'quality of education' and 'professional development'. However, it was deemed by inspectors that 'leadership and management' is not up to standard, resulting in an overall outcome of 'Requires Improvement', stripping Burnley college of its 'Good' Ofsted rating it was awarded in 2021.

== Notable people ==
=== Alumni ===
- Stewart Binns (born 1950), author and filmmaker
- Lily Fontaine (born 1997), musician
- Kay Hartley (1929–2005), archaeologist
- Grace Johnson (born 2004), cricketer
- Marko Maroši (born 1993), footballer
- Kevin Smith (born 1954), businessman

=== Staff ===
- Derek Webster, radio presenter
