= Listed buildings in Orrell, Greater Manchester =

Orrell is an area in the Metropolitan Borough of Wigan, Greater Manchester, England. It contains 14 listed buildings that are recorded in the National Heritage List for England. Of these, one is listed at Grade II*, the middle of the three grades, and the others are at Grade II, the lowest grade. The area is largely rural, and most of the listed buildings are houses and associated structures. The other listed buildings include a stone post, a farmhouse, a church and a public house.

== Key ==
Grade	Criteria
II*	Particularly important buildings of more than special interest
II	Buildings of national importance and special interest

== Buildings ==
Name and location	Photograph	Date	Notes	Grade
Ackhurst Hall; 53.55649°N 2.68767°W		17th century	A farmhouse that was extended in the 19th century, it is in sandstone with a stone-slate roof. There are two storeys with an attic, four bays, and a three-bay extension. The second and fourth bays are gabled, the second bay containing a porch with a round-headed entrance. Most of the windows are mullioned and transomed, there is a canted bay window in the fourth bay, and the windows in the extension are casements. Inside are timber framed partitions with wattle and daub infill.	II*
Sundial, Ackhurst Hall; 53.55634°N 2.68776°W	—	17th century	The sundial is in front of the hall, and is in stone. It consists of a baluster with a round plinth on two round steps. The flat top is not original.	II
Nunnery Cottage and Mount Farm Cottage; 53.53959°N 2.70009°W	—	17th century	Most of the fabric in the two houses dates from the 19th century, with an extension in the 20th century. They are in stone with roofs of slate and felt. Nunnery Cottage to the east has two storeys and three bays, the windows on the front are casements with wedge lintels, and elsewhere are sash windows. The round-headed doorway has an archivolt, a keystone, and a fanlight. Mount Farm Cottage contains the older material, and has mullioned windows with hood moulds and a plain entrance, and inside is a bressumer.	II
Orrell Hall; 53.54973°N 2.69763°W	—	17th century	A house that was altered later, it is in stone with quoins, a first floor cornice, and a slate roof. There are two storeys with an attic, two gabled bays, and a 20th-century rear extension. The doorway has a round head, moulded jambs, imposts and an archivolt; above it is a plaque with an architrave. On the ground floor are two canted bay windows, the windows on the upper floor are sashes, and at the rear are mullioned and transomed windows.	II
Orrell post 53.54011°N 2.70448°W		17th or 18th century	The post is in stone, and consists of a Tuscan column on a square plinth. It has a rusticated band and a square top with a ball finial.	II
Gathurst Fold; 53.55793°N 2.69805°W	—	1708	Some of the material in the house may be from an earlier date. It is in stone on a plinth, with quoins and a reconstituted stone-slate roof. There are two storeys and four bays, the outer two bays projecting forward and gabled. The windows are mullioned, most with hood moulds, and in the first bay is a datestone with a hood mould. In the left return is a gabled porch. Inside the house are timber framed partitions with daub and wattle infill.	II
Dean Brook House; 53.54078°N 2.71569°W	—	1730s	A brick house on a moulded plinth, with rusticated quoins, stone dressings, and a stone-slate roof. There are two storeys and two bays. The doorway has rusticated jambs and a wedge lintel with a keystone. The windows on the front are sashes with rusticated cambered arches, and on the sides and at the rear are horizontally-sliding sash windows. Also at the rear is a stair window with transoms.	II
Orrell House and cottage 53.55134°N 2.70339°W	—	1737	The house is in roughcast stone with a stone-slate roof, and has an irregular plan, with various phases of building. There are two storeys and three bays, the first two gables are gabled, and the third bay is higher. Along both sides are three bays, most of which are gabled. The windows vary; some are mullioned, and others are casements or sashes.	II
St James' Church and presbytery 53.52968°N 2.71382°W		1805	A Roman Catholic church that was lengthened in 1841, and the tower added in 1882. It is in stone, the original part is rendered, and it has a hipped slate roof. The church consists of a nave, a north chapel, a west tower, and a presbytery to the east. The tower is in Italianate style, and has a porch with Tuscan pilasters and a doorway with a fanlight, above which is a corbelled frieze, a cornice and a parapet. There is a round-headed niche with a statue, round-headed bell openings, impost bands, and on the top is an entablature and a lead ogee swept roof with a cross finial. Along the sides of the church are round-headed windows. The presbytery is rendered, with two storeys and attics, three bays, a Tuscan doorcase, bay windows, and sash windows.	II
321 Orrell Road; 53.53993°N 2.70967°W	—	1820	A stone house with a sill band, a top frieze cornice, a parapet, and a slate roof. In the centre of the parapet is a raised panel with an oval cartouche. There are two storeys and three bays. The windows are casements, and above the central doorway is a canopy.	II
Gathurst Fold Farmhouse; 53.55771°N 2.69854°W	—	Early 19th century	The farmhouse is in stone with rusticated quoins and a stone-slate roof. There are two storeys and three bays. The porch has quoins, a band, a blocking course, and an elliptical-headed entrance. There is one casement window, the other windows are sash windows, all in architraves.	II
The Mount public house 53.53936°N 2.69846°W		Early 19th century	Originally a private house, later a public house, it is in ashlar stone, the extensions are stuccoed, with stone dressings, a band, cornices, and hipped roofs. The central block has three storeys and three bays, flanked by bowed extensions with two storeys and two bays, and a further recessed two-storey one-bay extension to the left. In the centre is a porch with Tuscan columns, and an entablature with a pulvinated frieze, and most of the windows are sashes. The right return has five bays, the middle three bays projecting under a pediment.	II
The Nunnery; 53.53971°N 2.69953°W	—	Early 19th century	Two stone houses on a plinth, with stone dressings, quoins, a cornice, and a felted roof with coped gables and ball finials. The windows are sashes, there are three gabled dormers, and the round-headed entrance has a fanlight. On the roof is a hexagonal cupola on Tuscan columns. In the right return is a blocked elliptical entrance, a clock face, and lozenge vents.	II
Trinity Trees; 53.53823°N 2.69406°W	—	c. 1832	A stuccoed brick house with stone dressings, wide eaves, and a hipped slate roof. There are two storeys, three bays on the front and sides, and a rear wing. On three sides is a decorative full-height iron verandah. In the left return is a porch with a bowed front. The windows front are cast iron and mullioned, and in the central bay on the ground floor is a canted oriel window with an ogee base and a swept roof.	II
