= Kevin Smith (businessman) =

British businessman (born 1954)

Sir Kevin Smith FRAeS (born 22 May 1954) is a British businessman who was the chief executive, from January 2003 to 31 December 2011, of GKN plc. He joined GKN in November 1999 as managing director of GKN Aerospace.

Born in Nelson, Lancashire, he attended Burnley College and the University of Central Lancashire, earning a bachelor's degree in business studies.

Prior to GKN, he had been with British Aerospace (BAE plc) since 1980, first as a contracts officer. He advanced into the Commercial Directorate, where, by February 1990, he had become commercial director, as well as having been appointed to the Military Aircraft Ltd board. He served, lastly, as group managing director of the New Business division.

Smith was created a Knight Bachelor in 2007. Smith joined Unitas Capital as a partner in 2012. Smith joined Rolls-Royce in 2016.

== Boards ==
- Former non-executive director of Scottish and Southern Energy plc.
- Served on the boards of:

Saab AB
Panavia GmbH
Eurofighter GmbH
SEPECA
Matra BAe Dynamics
Claverham Group Ltd (non-executive director)
GCHQ
Ministerial Sub-Committee on Smart Procurement, member

== Affiliations ==
- Fellow of the Royal Aeronautical Society
- Companion of the Chartered Management Institute
