= St Johns Beacon =

Radio and observation tower in Liverpool, England

St Johns Beacon Radio City Tower
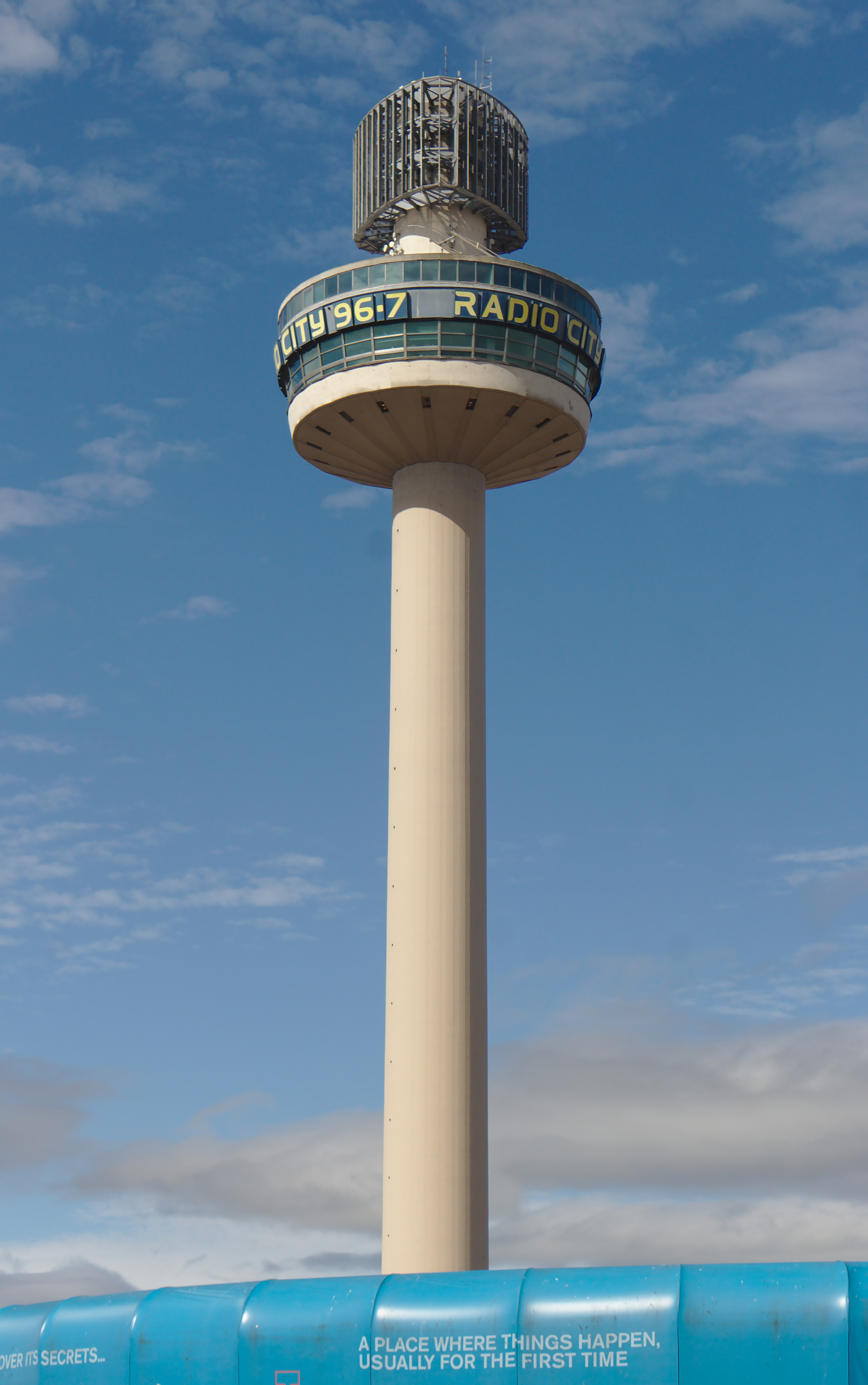
- St Johns Beacon, viewed from Lime Street in June 2021
- Alternative names: Radio City Tower; St John's Tower

General information
- Status: Temporarily closed
- Type: Observation platform Office facility
- Location: Liverpool, England, United Kingdom, 1 Houghton Street; Liverpool; L1 1RL, England
- Coordinates: 53°24′23″N 2°58′55″W
- Construction started: 1966
- Completed: 1969
- Opened: 1971
- Renovated: 1999–2000
- Closed: 31 December 2024
- Cost: £5 million (refurbishment)
- Owner: RivingtonHark

Height
- Roof: 138 m (453 ft)

Technical details
- Floor count: 5
- Lifts/elevators: 2

Design and construction
- Architects: James A. Roberts Associates, Birmingham
- Structural engineer: Scott Wilson Kirkpatrick

Other information
- Parking: St John's Shopping Centre

Website
- stjohnsbeacon.co.uk

St Johns Beacon (also known locally as the Radio City Tower) is a Grade II listed communications and observation tower in Liverpool, England. Designed by James A. Roberts Associates, it was built in 1969 and opened by Queen Elizabeth II. The tower is 138 metres (453 ft) tall, and is the second-tallest free-standing structure in Liverpool after the 40-storey West Tower. It has a 10 m (33 ft) long antenna on the roof, making it the tallest structure in Liverpool when antennas are included.

The building was listed at Grade II in November 2020, when Historic England said its design "embodies the technological bravura and spirit of the space age". It is shorter and newer than the BT Tower in London, another communications tower built with a revolving restaurant.

The building housed the studios and offices of local commercial radio station Radio City (now known as Hits Radio Liverpool) alongside its sister station, Greatest Hits Radio, from 2000 to 2024.

== Early history ==
At the top of the tower was a luxury revolving restaurant, the façade and floor of the restaurant revolving as one unit, while the roof was used as an observation platform for visitors. There are 558 stairs up to the top, and two lift shafts with lifts reaching the top in 30 seconds.

The tower is structurally independent of the adjacent shopping centre, with a simple foundation onto sandstone. The foundation is 18 metres (60 ft) in diameter, 5.2 m (17 ft) deep and begins 12 m (40 ft) below Houghton Street. It has a tapering shaft that was built using slip-formed concrete. The crow's nest structure at the top was added after the shaft was formed.

The original restaurant closed in 1979 for health and safety issues. It was re-opened, with a reduced capacity and additional fire prevention measures, during the early 1980s. The restaurant was eventually re-fitted as a Buck Rogers space-themed restaurant in 1983, but closed again for lack of business. After this, the observation deck and the restaurant remained closed.

In the following years, the tower lay empty and derelict. Often considered to be an eyesore or a white elephant by fellow Liverpudlians, blue "UFO style" neon strip lights were added to the perimeter of the tower in 1994 in an attempt to increase its attractiveness. These were later removed upon the refurbishment of the tower.

In late 1998, Radio City, owned and operated by the then Emap Radio, expressed interest in refurbishing the tower to house Radio City and Magic 1548, including their studios and required office space.

Work commenced in 1999 and was completed in the summer of 2000.

== Later history ==
The tower was refurbished between 1999 and 2000 at a cost of £5 million. It reopened as Radio City 96.7 (and Magic 1548) in August 2000. The outdoor observation deck, which had been located on the roof of the restaurant, was transformed into a second floor, holding the offices for the radio station. The studios were on the lower floor, which was previously the restaurant. The original revolving structure and machinery were left intact during the refurbishment. Brackets were added to lock the moving structure in place.

The tower has been known to sway in heavy winds. This is a design feature and common in construction within skyscrapers and tall buildings in order to prevent structural damage from wind pressure.

During the refurbishment between the first and second floors, the Radio City 96.7 lettering was added. Until 17 April 2024 it was illuminated in yellow at night. Following the rebranding of Radio City as Hits Radio, the signage is no longer illuminated.

Lights were added under the base of the crow's nest structure, which are illuminated all day and periodically change colour. The second floor windows are sometimes illuminated at night, often with a particular colour to mark certain events.

The refurbishment added an advertising framework at the top of the tower, designed for both a fabric banner and illuminated light boxes.

Window cleaning and exterior maintenance is performed by specialist teams, who descend down the side of the tower from the roof mounted Building Maintenance Unit (BMU).

The roof houses the local 10C Digital Audio Broadcasting multiplex for Liverpool. Hits Radio Liverpool and Greatest Hits Radio do not directly broadcast from the roof. Their FM signal is transmitted by the Allerton Park Transmitter, along with BBC Radio Merseyside on 95.8FM.

In 2017, the Liverpool-based tech startup Scan and Make organised the first edition of the art contest exhibition "Making Art 4.0" in the Radio offices.

In 2018, an artwork banner was displayed on the beacon's advertisement framework. It was titled Liverpool 2018, celebrating 10 years since the city's 2008 European Capital Of Culture events.

Radio City Talk ceased broadcasting on 31 May 2020, after it was deemed not financially viable due to low listening figures.

Until December 2024, the building housed the studios and offices for the regional programming of Hits Radio Liverpool and Hits Radio Lancashire, as well as the national weekday breakfast show for Greatest Hits Radio.

On 28 October 2024, Bauer Media announced that it would be vacating St Johns Beacon after 24 years, following a decision not to renew the lease. The final breakfast show to be broadcast from the building aired on 24 December 2024.

== St Johns Beacon Viewing Gallery ==
St John's Beacon viewing gallery logo

In 2010, the building's first floor was opened to members of the public. The gallery gave the opportunity to view a 360° panoramic view of Liverpool.

The viewing gallery closed in December 2024.

== Failed zip wire proposal ==
In late June 2020, Zip World proposed plans for a permanent £5 million zip wire to be installed in Liverpool City Centre, which would have started from the second floor of the Beacon and end on the roof of the Central Library. The project attracted mixed public opinions, with many people claiming that it would be a permanent defacing of one of the city's world famous landmarks. Others expressed concerns that the noise of the zip wire could disturb library users. The plans went before Liverpool City Council, which on 30 June 2020 approved them; however, on 2 September 2020 it was reported that Liverpool Mayor Joe Anderson was withdrawing permission for this use of the Central Library, effectively vetoing the proposal.

== Yellow Submarine attraction and redevelopment ==
In October 2026, Apple Corps, Liverpool City Council and the Liverpool City Region Combined Authority announced plans to redevelop the tower alongside the adjacent St John's Market site. Under the plans, the tower will house a visitor experience based on The Beatles' 1968 animated film Yellow Submarine. Backed by Paul McCartney and Ringo Starr, the project is scheduled to open in 2028.

== See also ==
- BT Tower
- List of tallest buildings and structures in Liverpool
- List of towers
- Architecture of Liverpool

Records
| Preceded by Royal Liver Building | Tallest Building in Liverpool; 1965 – 2008 | Succeeded by West Tower |
