= Wire FM =

Coordinates: 53.539099°N 2.699343°W

Greatest Hits Radio Liverpool & The North West (Warrington)
- Orrell; England
- Broadcast area: North Cheshire
- Frequency: FM: 107.2 MHz
- RDS: GRT_HITS

Programming
- Format: Classic Hits
- Network: Greatest Hits Radio

Ownership
- Owner: Bauer

History
- First air date: 1 September 1998
- Former names: Wire FM

Links
- Website: Greatest Hits Radio

Greatest Hits Radio Liverpool & The North West (Warrington) (formerly Wire FM) is an Independent Local Radio station serving the Warrington, Widnes and Runcorn areas of Cheshire.

Following its sale to Bauer Radio, the station was closed and merged with the Greatest Hits Radio network in September 2020.

== History ==
Wire FM logo used from 2010 to 2016

Final logo used from 2016 to 2020.

Wire FM's origins began in 1990 when two presenters at Warrington's hospital radio station, Stephen Cooper and Philip Houltby, decided to run an RSL station for the town. Cooper had previous RSL experience via Waves AM in Peterhead.

The station was duly organised and went on air as Warrington Festival of Music Radio (WFMR) for two weeks in May 1991. It broadcast from a borrowed portable cabin located behind the Warrington Town Hall Gates on 1602 kHz, with Matthew Newton & Mark Gabler among the presenting team.

The station was successful in both audience response and commercial respects, and further RSL broadcasts were made in the spring of 1992 and 1993. Stephen Armstrong-Smith and David Duffy joined the management team and a 14' touring caravan was converted into a mobile studio.

During 1994, the attraction of the caravan had waned. Funding for the Warrington Festival of Music had also decreased with the demise of its main supporter, the Warrington & Runcorn Development Corporation. In the 1994 broadcast presenters were also heard to refer to WFMR as Warrington's Favourite Music Radio.

The decision was made to move 'indoors', sever the link with the Festival, and switch to FM. This had significant risks, as costs for FM licences were higher, and new transmitters and studio equipment had to be bought. However, the broadcast went ahead during June 1994 from a 'Community House' on Nora Street in the Howley area of Warrington, borrowed from Warrington Borough Council.

=== RSL broadcasts ===
The move to FM saw a step change in the popularity of the station with the audience and advertisers. It was decided to repeat the broadcast during November 1994, and the decision was made to change the station name from WFMR to Warrington FM. It was renamed again as Wire FM, to reflect Warrington's wire manufacturing heritage.

At the beginning of 1995, Cheshire was added to the Radio Authority's list of locations where so-called 'Sallie' (Small Scale Alternative Location Licence) licences would be advertised. This brought new impetuous and further RSLs were run in June and November 1995. Throughout this period, programming followed a mainstream commercial format, along with regular community features and local news supplied by the Warrington Guardian.

During 1995, with the licence application pending, the Wire FM management team had initially formed an alliance with the Marcher Radio Group to bid for Warrington. However, Marcher were dropped in favour of the Independent Radio Group PLC (IRG), following their formation and subsequent successful bid for Wigan and St. Helens as Wish FM by Tony Dewhurst and Jeff Graham, who also authored the licence application. By this point, Stephen Cooper had left the team, and Stephen Armstrong-Smith had joined IRG as their regional engineer.

During 1996, Cheshire was advertised as the location for two potential radio stations. The remaining members of Wire FM's management team, Philip Houltby and David Duffy, assembled the bid in conjunction with IRG's licence bid team consisting of New Zealanders Kris Burford and Ande McPherson. Competition for the licence was expected to be strong and significant resources were allocated to the bid resulting in more than 250 letters of support being received and comprehensive research being undertaken and analysed by the most respected research organisations.

=== Extended coverage area ===
Following a review of the coverage pattern predicted for the High Warren Reservoir transmitter site, the strategic decision was made to include the Borough of Halton (Widnes and Runcorn) in the intended coverage area. To strengthen the bid in Halton, John Grindley (known on air as Phil Johnson) was invited to join the bid and bring his experience of the Halton FM RSL broadcasts to the team.

=== Licence bid ===
There was much discussion on Widnes and Runcorn's acceptance of the name 'Wire', however, the Radio Authority later indicated this was a key factor in awarding the licence. Application documents were submitted during May 1997 and the Radio Authority awarded the licence to Wire FM during November 1997.

Competing applications were :

- Warrington – Warrington FM (local consortium, supported by David Rodgers of Orchard FM)
- Warrington – Radio Warrington (Warrington Collegiate Institute-led bid backed by The Wireless Group)
- Halton – Fun FM (backed by The Bay)

Following the licence award, problems with securing an antenna site caused a six-month delay in getting on-air. The original space secured on the High Warren tower operated by Mercury Communications was to another user. But Orange were in the process of securing planning permission for a new, higher tower on close by land owned by Warrington Golf Course. A deal was struck and Orange were able to offer the station the prime antenna location at the top of the tower.

=== Station launch ===
The station launched under programme director Simon Wynne, who at the time was also PD of 1458 Lite AM in Manchester, and sales director Mark Collins.

Phil Johnson was the first voice on the station, presenting its weekday breakfast show. The first track to be played on the station was Lisa Stansfield's The Real Thing. Other launch presenters included Pete Pinnington (drive), Lee McGrath (evenings), Bobby Prior, John Seddon (sport) and Tony Johnson (Sunday night).

=== Ownership changes ===
In 1999, the owners of Wire FM, the Independent Radio Group, were brought by The Wireless Group in 1999. Six years later, TWG was taken over by UTV Media (later Wireless Group).

In February 2019, Wire FM was sold, along with Wireless's other local stations, to Bauer Radio.

=== Relocation ===
In early 2007, the station's owners approached UK media regulator OFCOM to ask permission to move the station's base from Warrington to the Haydock or Newton-le-Willows area of Merseyside as part of a plan to co-locate with two other stations from the Wireless Group group: Wish FM (Wigan and St Helens) and Tower FM (Bolton and Bury).

The original plan was abandoned but from the autumn of 2009, all three stations were based at studios in the Orrell area of Wigan.

== Station rebrand ==
On 8 February 2019, Wire FM and the Wireless Group's local radio stations were sold to Bauer Radio. The sale was ratified in March 2020 following an inquiry by the Competition and Markets Authority.

On 27 May 2020, it was announced that Wire FM will join Bauer's Greatest Hits Radio network.

On 13 July 2020, local programming outside weekday breakfast was replaced by networked output from the GHR network, with Wire FM retaining its own branding.

In September 2020, the station merged with several in the North West of England and North Wales, as Greatest Hits Radio North West. The station's local breakfast show was replaced by a regional drivetime show. Localised news bulletins, traffic updates and advertising were retained. The station's Orrell studios were closed.
