= Hits Radio Lancashire =

Coordinates: 53.8°N 2.6°W

- Manchester; United Kingdom
- Broadcast area: Lancashire
- Frequencies: FM: 97.4 MHz; DAB: 12A
- RDS: HITS_LANC
- Branding: Lancashire's Hits Radio; The Biggest Hits, The Biggest Throwbacks

Programming
- Format: CHR/Pop
- Network: Hits Radio

Ownership
- Owner: Bauer Media Audio UK
- Sister stations: Greatest Hits Radio Lancashire; Hits Radio Liverpool

History
- First air date: 5 October 1982; 43 years ago
- Former names: Red Rose Radio; Red Rose Rock FM; 97.4 Rock FM; Rock FM
- Former frequencies: 97.3 FM; 999 MW

Technical information
- Licensing authority: Ofcom

Links
- Webcast: Rayo
- Website: https://hellorayo.co.uk/hits-radio/lancashire/

Logo used until 2024.

Hits Radio Lancashire, formerly Rock FM, is an Independent Local Radio station, owned and operated by Bauer Media Audio UK as part of the Hits Radio network. It broadcasts to Lancashire, North West England.

As of March 2025, the station has a weekly audience of 188,000 listeners according to RAJAR.

== Overview ==
Rock FM logo used from 2008 to 2015.

Originally launched in 1982 as Red Rose Radio, transmitting on 97.3 MHz and 999 kHz (301m MW). The FM frequency transmission changed when the station split to 97.4 MHz in 1990.

In 1990, Red Rose Radio was split into two stations - Red Rose Rock FM using the FM frequency and Red Rose Gold on the medium wave frequency. Rock FM was given its name as the station was initially going to be based in Blackpool, Lancashire. However the agreement for the studio premises subsequently fell through and the station remained in Preston.

The managing director was Dave Lincoln, with Mark Matthews as programme director, and at that time the station was owned by the Miss World Group, later known as Trans World Communications (owned by Owen Oyston) and which eventually became part of Bauer Radio (previously EMAP Radio).

The total survey area of the station for RAJAR is broadly defined as western, southern and central Lancashire including parts of Greater Manchester and Merseyside, but the station is audible on FM from Cumbria down into Wales towards The West Midlands and minor parts of North Shropshire

From its launch, Rock FM was based at studios in a converted church (St. Paul's) in Preston. The station consistently rates as the number one commercial radio station in its target service area by reach, share and hours. Over a quarter of all adults in its market listen every week.

In January 2020, Bauer announced Rock FM would cease broadcasting from its Preston studios and co-locate with Hits Radio at Bauer's Northern headquarters in Manchester the following month. The station retains local news, advertising and charity staff at offices elsewhere in the city.

As of December 2023, the former studios at St Paul's Church are now used as office space.

On 16 November 2023, it was announced that Rock FM's weekday breakfast show - the station's sole remaining local programme - would be merged with Radio City in Liverpool and simulcast across the two stations.

As of January 2024, presenter Joel Ross continues with Bauer, with the breakfast show broadcast from Bauer's Liverpool studios. Rock FM retained its own local news bulletins, traffic updates and advertising.

=== Hits Radio rebrand ===
On 10 January 2024, station owners Bauer announced Rock FM would be rebranded as Hits Radio Lancashire from April 2024, as part of a network-wide relaunch involving 17 local radio stations in England and Wales.

=== End of regional programming ===
On 20 March 2025, Bauer announced it would end its regional Hits Radio breakfast show for the North West to be replaced by a new national breakfast show for England and Wales on 9 June 2025. Local news and traffic bulletins will continue.

The station's final regional programme aired on 6 June 2025 with breakfast presenter Joel Ross moving to a new national breakfast show on sister station Hits Radio 00s.

== Programming ==
Hits Radio network programming is broadcast and produced from Bauer’s London headquarters or studios in Manchester & occasionally Newcastle.

Local programming ended on 5 June 2025. At the time local programming ceased, it consisted of The Hits Radio Breakfast Show with Leanne & Joel, which was broadcast from Bauer's Liverpool studios at St Johns Beacon and later from Bauer’s central Manchester studios. The show also aired on sister station Hits Radio Liverpool.

=== News ===
Hits Radio Lancashire broadcasts local news bulletins for Lancashire hourly from 6am-7pm on weekdays, from 7am-1pm on Saturdays and Sundays. Headlines are broadcast on the half hour during weekday breakfast and drivetime shows, alongside traffic bulletins.

National bulletins from Sky News Radio are carried overnight with bespoke networked bulletins on weekend afternoons, originating from the Hits Radio Leeds newsroom.
