= Trans World Communications =

Investment vehicle of Owen Oyston

Trans World Communications (or TWC for short) was the investment vehicle of businessman Owen Oyston. It operated radio stations and played a part in the Miss World Beauty Pageant.

== About ==
Initially called The Red Rose Group because of its beginnings at Red Rose Radio in Preston, Trans World went on to purchase Radio Aire in Leeds, Red Dragon Radio in Cardiff and Piccadilly Radio in Manchester to form the UK's first radio group.

Perhaps TWC's biggest star was James Whale whose radio programme was 'networked' from Radio Aire in Yorkshire to Red Rose Radio in Lancashire in 1987 and even simulcast on ITV from Yorkshire Television's studios from 1989.

== Take over ==
TWC was later taken over by East Midland Allied Press. However, EMAP's take over of TWC was originally blocked by The Radio Authority after they ruled EMAP, who already owned 30% of Trans World, would breach local radio ownership restrictions as it meant they would hold eight radio franchises - two more than the legislation of the day allowed. The Guardian Media Group, which owned 20 per cent of Trans World, wanting to increase its stake but was prevented in doing so due to the national newspapers it owns.

EMAP went on to acquire further radio stations in the UK until its radio arm was eventually bought by the Germany-based Bauer Media Group in 2008.

Oyston's company also turned to the beauty business, taking over the Miss World Organisation and reforming it into Trans World Communications. In 1991, a boardroom battle forced him out and The Miss World brand has been privately owned by the Morley family since.
