= Wish FM =

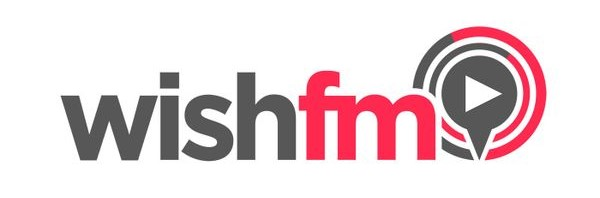
- Final logo used from 2016 till 2020.

Wigan, Greater Manchester, England; England
- Broadcast area: Wigan and St Helens
- Frequencies: FM: 102.4 MHz

History
- First air date: 1 April 1997
- Last air date: 31 August 2020

Technical information
- Transmitter coordinates: 53.5092°N 2.7197°W

Wish FM was an Independent Local Radio station serving Wigan in Greater Manchester and the St Helens area of Merseyside from studios in the Orrell area of Wigan.

Following its sale to Bauer Radio, the station was closed and merged with the Greatest Hits Radio network in September 2020.

== Overview ==
Logo used from 2004 to 2010.

Wish FM broadcast on 102.4 FM from a transmitter, powered by a wind generator, sited on Billinge Hill, St. Helens, Merseyside.

It began broadcasting on 1 April 1997, as the first licence applied for and won by Tony Dewhurst and Jeff Graham of the recently formed Independent Radio Group. The station took its name from the initials WIgan and St Helens.

The station was based in Orrell, Wigan, but in early 2007, the station's owners approached UK media regulator Ofcom to ask permission to move the station's base to Newton-le-Willows, Merseyside, as part of a plan to share a single building with two other stations from the UTV Radio group: Tower FM and Wire FM.

However, after following the sale of Stockport-based Imagine FM, UTV Media (now Wireless Group) decided to keep Wish FM in Orrell, and co-located Wire FM and Tower FM into the Orrell studios.

== Station rebrand ==
On 8 February 2019, Wish FM and the Wireless Group's local radio stations were sold to Bauer Radio. The sale was ratified in March 2020 following an inquiry by the Competition and Markets Authority.

On 27 May 2020, it was announced that Wish FM would join Bauer's Greatest Hits Radio network.

On 13 July 2020, local programming outside weekday breakfast was replaced by networked output from the GHR network, with Wish FM retaining its own branding.

In September 2020, Wish FM merged with six local stations in the North West of England and North Wales, as Greatest Hits Radio North West. The station's local breakfast show was replaced by a regional afternoon show. Localised news bulletins, traffic updates and advertising were retained. The station's Orrell studios were closed.
