= Hits Radio Liverpool =

British radio station based in Liverpool

Coordinates: 53.4062°N 2.9819°W

- Liverpool; United Kingdom
- Broadcast area: Merseyside, Cheshire and North Wales
- Frequencies: FM: 96.7 MHz; DAB: 10C
- RDS: HITS_LPL

Programming
- Format: CHR/Pop
- Network: Hits Radio

Ownership
- Owner: Bauer Media Audio UK
- Sister stations: Greatest Hits Radio Liverpool & The North West; Hits Radio Lancashire

History
- First air date: 21 October 1974
- Former names: 194 Radio City; 96.7 City FM; City FM; Radio City 96.7; Radio City

Technical information
- Licensing authority: Ofcom

Links
- Webcast: Rayo
- Website: Hits Radio Liverpool

Hits Radio Liverpool, formerly Radio City, is an Independent Local Radio station, owned and operated by Bauer Media Audio UK as part of the Hits Radio network. It broadcasts to Merseyside, Cheshire and parts of north Wales.

As of March 2025, the station has a weekly audience of 260,000 listeners according to RAJAR.

== History ==
=== Launch and early years ===
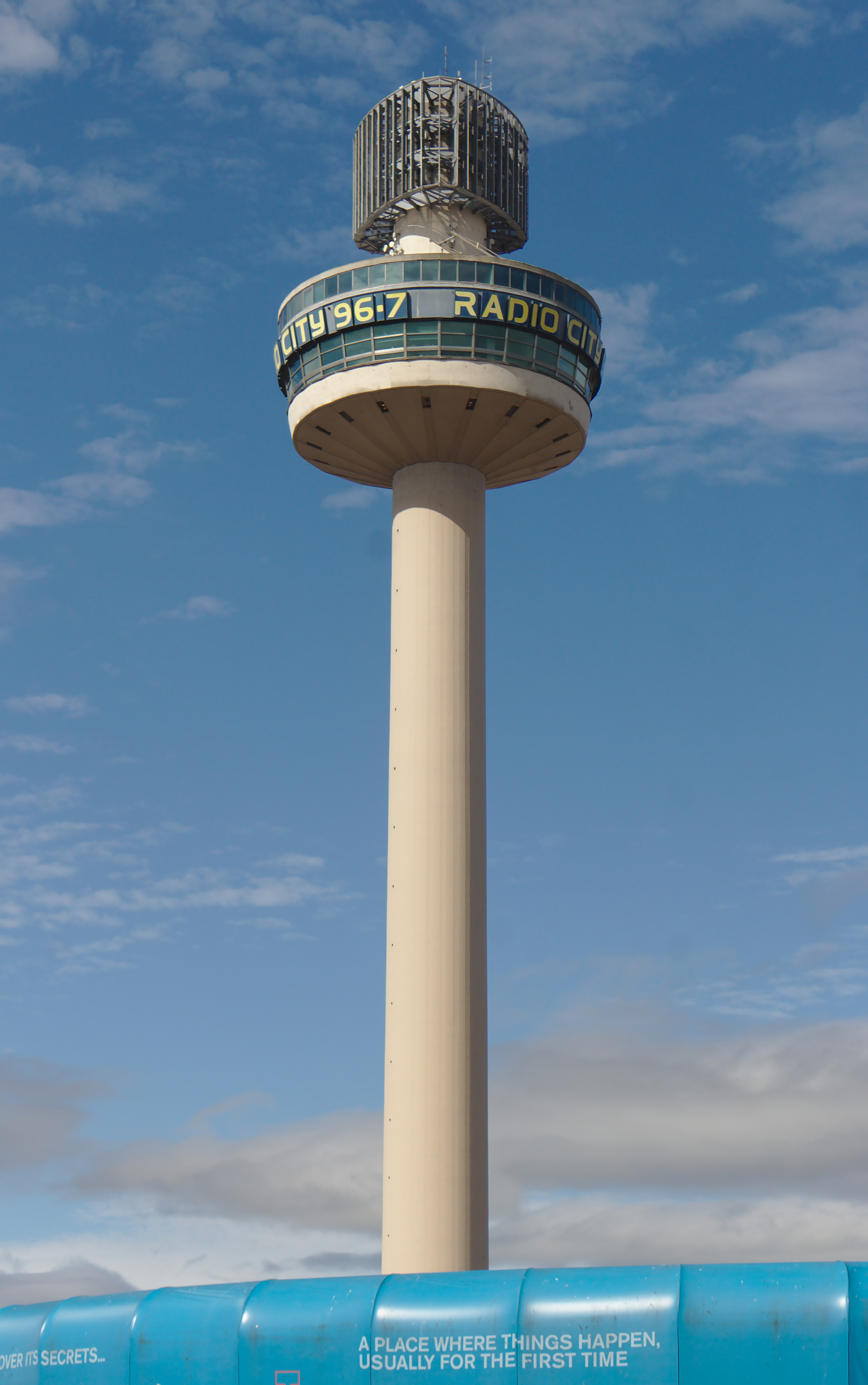
St Johns Beacon, home to Radio City and its sister stations from July 2000 until December 2024.

Radio City logo used from 2008 to 2015.

After the introduction of the Sound Broadcasting Act 1972 which allowed the legal operation of commercial radio in the UK, in 1974, Radio City (Sound of Merseyside) Ltd won the contract to broadcast the Independent Local Radio station for Liverpool and its surrounding areas, with studios originally based in Stanley Street in Liverpool City Centre.

194 Radio City began broadcasting at 5:58 am on 21 October 1974, with an announcement by its founding managing director Terry Smith (It's two minutes to six on Monday October 21st 1974. For the very first time, this is 194 Radio City broadcasting to Merseyside). The first song to be played on the station was Stevie Wonder's "You Are the Sunshine of My Life". As reflected in the name, the station originally broadcast on 1548 kHz AM, then known as 194 metres medium wave, from a transmitter at Rainford. The station was also given an FM frequency of 96.7 MHz, but did not begin broadcasting on FM until a few months later, after the transmitter was vandalised. In the early days of Marcher Sound, the evening programmes of the station were simulcasted to the fledgling station, so for a period in the 1980s, Radio City had in theory, four frequencies (Marcher Sound aired on 95.4 MHz and 1260 kHz).

=== Frequency split ===
In 1989, the Conservative government enforced new regulation to enable better choice by ceasing the simulcasting of radio stations on both AM and FM. Radio City split its frequencies by continuing its top 40 format on FM under the recently introduced new name, City FM. On AM, a new talk station was launched called City Talk 1548 AM. This was unusual as most stations launched 'golden oldie' stations on their former AM frequencies. The City Talk experiment proved short-lived and Radio City Gold launched in its place in 1991, later known as City Gold. The AM service rebranded as Magic 1548 on Monday 17 March 1997.

In 1991, the company was acquired by EMAP Radio, who renamed the main FM station back to a modern version of its original name, as Radio City 96.7, the name it used until 2014. The station left its original Stanley Street base and on Tuesday 18 July 2000, the station began broadcasting from St. John's Beacon, which in the past was a revolving restaurant and viewing platform.

The City Talk format was revived when, on 9 November 2006, it was announced by Ofcom that Radio City had beaten competition from rival broadcasters to win a new FM licence for a talk station for the Liverpool area. The new City Talk launched on 28 January 2008 and broadcasts on 105.9 FM. Due to poor listening figures, the station dropped most of its presenters and had a format change which meant, outside of peak listening hours such as breakfast and drivetime, the station broadcast a mix of classic hit music similar to the music played on sister station Magic 1548, although under the format change the station was not allowed to simulcast with Magic, only Radio City.

=== Sale to Bauer ===
In 2007, Emap announced the sale of its radio and publishing divisions to Bauer Media Group. This was completed in 2008 and Radio City then became part of the "Big City" Network, now the Hits Radio Network.

In September 2014, Bauer announced it would extend the Radio City brand by reviving the name on Magic 1548 as Radio City 2 and launching a new localised version of DAB station The Hits Radio, known as Radio City 3. The rebrand took place on 5 January 2015, with Radio City 3 due to launch on 19 January 2015. Radio City Talk was not affected.

This decision was later repealed in September 2017, when the Bauer City 3 branding was withdrawn in favour of The Hits across all Bauer City DAB Multiplexes. Radio City 2, which had moved to FM (swapping allocations with Radio City Talk) in December 2015, became Greatest Hits Radio Liverpool & The North West in January 2019.

Radio City logo used from 2015 to 2024.

In August 2019, following further Ofcom deregulation to local commercial radio stations, the station's local drivetime show was dropped in favour of networked programming from Hits Radio.

On 31 May 2020, sister station Radio City Talk ceased broadcasting as it was deemed financially unviable to continue to run due to low listening figures.

In November 2023, it was announced Radio City's weekday breakfast show - the station's sole remaining local programme - would be merged with Lancashire's Rock FM and simulcast across both stations. This began in January 2024. Radio City retained local news, traffic bulletins and advertising.

=== Hits Radio rebrand ===
On 10 January 2024, station owners Bauer announced Radio City would be rebranded as Hits Radio Liverpool from 17 April 2024, as part of a network-wide relaunch involving 17 local radio stations in England and Wales. The announcement signalled the end of the Radio City brand after nearly 50 years of broadcasting. The local breakfast show was unaffected by the rebrand.

=== Departure from St Johns Beacon ===
On 28 October 2024, Bauer announced that after 24 years, it would vacate its St Johns Beacon premises, following a decision not to renew the lease. The final show to be broadcast from St Johns Beacon aired on 24 December 2024.

=== End of regional programming ===
On 20 March 2025, Bauer announced it would end its regional Hits Radio breakfast show for the North West to be replaced by a new national breakfast show for England and Wales on 9 June 2025. Local news and traffic bulletins will continue.

The station's final regional programme aired on 6 June 2025 with breakfast presenter Joel Ross moving to a new national breakfast show on sister station Hits Radio 00s.

== Transmission ==
The 96.7 FM signal comes from the Allerton Park transmitter in south-east Liverpool, which also transmits Hits Radio Liverpool's sister station Greatest Hits Radio Liverpool & The North West on 105.9 FM as well as BBC Radio Merseyside on 95.8 FM.

There is also a transmitter in the Mersey (Queensway) Tunnel. There are DAB digital radio transmitters at St John's Beacon, Billinge Hill (in St Helens, which also carries Greatest Hits Radio Greater Manchester), and Hope Mountain (near Wrexham). The Billinge Hill site has the strongest digital signal.

Radio City Talk previously broadcast on Radio City's original AM frequency from a transmitter at the former Bebington/Bromborough Power Station site until 31 May 2020, when the station closed. The original AM site was located near Rainford , using a directional array of antennas beaming the signal southwest towards the city centre and the Wirral. This site was used from launch until 1994, when it was replaced by the omnidirectional mast at Bebington due to signal interference.

== Programming ==
Hits Radio network programming is broadcast and produced from Bauer’s London headquarters or studios in Manchester & occasionally Newcastle.

=== News ===
Hits Radio Liverpool broadcast local news bulletins hourly from 6 am – 7 pm on weekdays, and from 7 am – 1 pm on Saturdays and Sundays. Headlines are broadcast on the half hour during weekday breakfast and drivetime shows, alongside traffic bulletins.

National bulletins from Sky News Radio are carried overnight with bespoke networked bulletins on weekend afternoons, usually originating from the Hits Radio Leeds newsroom.

As Radio City, the station formerly aired sports programming, focusing largely on Liverpool FC and Everton FC. Until the end of the 2014–15 season, the station aired live match commentaries of both clubs.

Until 2020, the station aired a twice-weekly Legends phone-in on Monday and Thursday evenings during the football season, hosted by John Aldridge and Graeme Sharp. However due to the suspension of the 2019–20 Premier League, the show did not air in 2020.

== Notable past presenters ==
- John Bishop
- Alan Bleasdale
- Billy Butler (now at Liverpool Live Radio)
- John Kennedy (deceased)
- Graham Dene (now at Boom Radio)
- Phil Easton (deceased)
- Neil Fitzmaurice
- John Gorman
- Peter Levy
- Arthur Murphy (deceased)
- Anton Powers (now at Kiss)
- Pete Price
- Simon Ross (now at Greatest Hits Radio)
- Kev Seed
- Bill Shankly (deceased)
- Norman Thomas (deceased)
- Pete Waterman
