= Red Rose Radio =

Former radio station based in Preston, Lancashire, England

Red Rose Radio was an Independent Local Radio station serving Preston, Blackpool and surrounding areas in Lancashire, England. Launched in 1982 from studios in Preston, it evolved into two stations on FM and AM, underwent several rebrandings, and now operates as Hits Radio Lancashire and Greatest Hits Radio Lancashire. No local programming is produced. However Local News, Weather and Travel has been retained along with some local advertising.

The "Red Rose Radio" name was re-launched as a community radio station in 2022 on DAB and online.

== History ==
Red Rose Radio was the first UK Independent Local Radio station to be licensed for Lancashire by the Independent Broadcasting Authority (IBA). Although a company of that name was incorporated in 1978 (as Red Rose Radio Limited), the licence was awarded in the early 1980s. The IBA advertised the franchise as being for Preston and Blackpool.

The original service launched on 5 October 1982 on 301m medium wave (999 kHz) and 97.3 MHz VHF/FM. The first voice was that of chairman - and local businessman - Owen Oyston. Following the news bulletin, Red Rose Reports, Dave Lincoln opened the station playing Barbra Streisand's Evergreen.

Red Rose Radio acquired a former Anglican parish church, St Paul’s, in Preston which was adapted as the broadcast base for the station. In January 2020, current owners Bauer Radio, announced that they were closing the studios to consolidate broadcasting operations in Manchester.

The station's first Programme Controller was Keith Macklin, who was a well-known broadcaster and journalist across the North West. From launch, Keith fronted a two-hour daily lunchtime magazine programme, Midday With Macklin". At launch, the station operated a schedule from 6am until midnight. Macklin was also the voice of the station's closedown.

The transmission area includes the major Lancashire towns of Lancaster, Blackpool, Preston and Blackburn. By January 1985, the Radio Marketing Bureau reported the total Adult (15+) population in the area to be 900,000 people. In the early days, Red Rose Radio "drew in 60% of people listening to the radio".

Although originally broadcasting the same programming across both medium wave and FM, by the late 1980s UK Independent Radio was encouraged to 'split frequencies' to provide alternative services in their transmission areas. On 1 June 1990, Red Rose Radio launched two new services: Red Rose Rock FM (now Hits Radio Lancashire) and Red Rose Gold on AM/medium wave (now Greatest Hits Radio Lancashire).

In 1994, Trans World Communications sold the group of radio stations they owned in North West England, including Red Rose Radio, to the publishing group EMAP. In January 2008, EMAP agreed to sell their UK magazine and radio business to the German Publishing group, Bauer Media Group, who control the station today.

The AM service has been rebranded a number of times throughout its life. When split programming was first introduced at the start of the 1990s, the new AM station was called Red Rose 999 before adopting the name Magic 999 (as part of the Magic network) in 1997. From 2015, it was relaunched as Rock FM 2 and in January 2019 when it became Greatest Hits Radio Lancashire, part of the Greatest Hits Radio network.

== Relaunch of the Red Rose ==
Red Rose Radio was re-launched in 2022 on DAB in Lancashire and online. www.redroseradio.uk
