= Radio City Talk =

Coordinates: 53.4062°N 2.9819°W

Liverpool; England
- Broadcast area: Merseyside, Cheshire and North Wales
- Frequencies: DAB: 10C; AM: 1548 kHz

Programming
- Format: News/talk/sports/rock

Ownership
- Owner: Bauer Media Audio UK
- Sister stations: Radio City; Greatest Hits Radio Liverpool

History
- First air date: 28 January 2008; 18 years ago
- Last air date: 31 May 2020; 5 years ago
- Former frequencies: FM: 105.9 MHz

Radio City Talk (previously City Talk 105.9) was an Independent Local Radio station in Liverpool, England.

In May 2020, it was announced by Bauer that Radio City Talk would cease broadcasting, after concluding that the station was no longer financially viable to run.

The station ceased broadcasting on 1 June 2020 at 00:06.

== History ==
Radio City Talk had made a number of changes to its format during its history.

=== Initial format (January 2008 – June 2009) ===
The original team of presenters on the station included actors Margi Clarke and Dean Sullivan, horse racing commentator and drive time presenter Paul Jacobs, football personalities Ian St John and John Aldridge, broadcaster Kim Hughes who presented breakfast with Phil Easton, veteran talk show hosts Pete Price and Roy Basnett, and newspaper journalists Larry Nield and Brian Reade. Trisha Goddard also hosted a Sunday evening show called Talk to Trisha, broadcast down-the-line from the presenter's home in Norwich.

Regular news, sport and business bulletins were broadcast, as well as lifestyle, celebrity and comedy features.

In its first RAJAR released on the station's first anniversary, City Talk 105.9 had a weekly audience of 63,000 listeners and a total of 364,000 listening hours (averaging at 5.8 hours per listener). The business plan for the station anticipated the audience would be around 75,000 listeners, tuning in for 5 hours a week, producing 375000 listening hours each week. Furthermore, according to an analysis of RAJAR figures, the station only recorded a 4% listening share.

=== Second format (June 2009 – January 2010) ===
In March 2009, Ofcom published a request from Bauer Radio to change the format of City Talk. The new format would retain all-speech programming at weekday breakfast & drivetime and weekend late breakfast. On weekdays, non-peak output during daytime hours would be mixed speech and soft pop-led music. Outside of weekday daytime, the new format would allow shared programming with Bauer's other Liverpool stations. The move was taken due to concerns within Bauer about the commercial viability of City Talk as a format. Research conducted by Bauer in support of the move suggested that those listeners who were actively choosing not to listen to the station as an all-talk service would reconsider the station were music included alongside the speech content.

Ofcom granted permission for the format change on 12 May 2009, although the new licence still required the station to air late-night phone-ins and Saturday afternoon sports coverage, in addition to the daytime talk programming requested by Bauer. Bauer was also told that the simulcasting of Magic 1548 content onto the City Talk frequency would not be permitted, but that some programming elements could be shared with Radio City.

On 21 June 2009, the station went live with their new talk-music format.

=== Third format (January 2010 – December 2015) ===
In January 2010, the station changed its format again, to operate a news-and-music mix. This saw extended news bulletins airing every 20 minutes (updated hourly, with more frequent updates during major breaking events), and soft adult contemporary music in between bulletins. This format aired for much of the day, except during the remaining presenter-led shows, such as the Pete Price phone in on Sunday – Thursday evenings and sports coverage, simulcast with Radio City. Later, the station reintroduced live all-speech breakfast and drive time programmes on weekdays, presented by Mick Coyle and Adam Catterall.

=== Fourth & Final format and frequency switch (December 2015 – May 2020) ===
In July 2015, Bauer submitted a formal request to OFCOM to swap City Talk's service with that of Radio City 2. The company proposed reformating Radio City Talk as a rock music station incorporating local news and sports coverage on Radio City 2's current AM frequency of 1548 AM. The request, which also removes requirements for all-speech shows at peak times and a late night phone-in, was approved three months later.

The switchover to the new rock, sports and talk format and transmission on AM took place on Monday 7 December 2015. Radio City Talk relaunched with a full schedule of live shows on weekdays, presented by Steve Hothersall (The Kick Off), Mick Coyle (Liverpool Live) and Adam Caterall (Full Time) and the Pete Price 'Late Night City' show being relayed from Radio City 2. Weekend programming consisted of specialist, sport and music output.

== The earlier City Talk experiment ==
Radio City Talk was not the first time Radio City had operated a speech service for Liverpool. Radio City Talk previously existed Radio City's MW frequency, broadcasting between 1989 and 1991 as a daytime opt-out between the hours of 0700 and 1900 on weekdays, sharing content with Radio City's FM service outside these times. This approach differed from that taken by the other stations, which generally launched "oldies" format stations on their former AM frequencies.

Despite a speech format being suited to AM broadcasting, it was not a success so in 1991 the station was closed and Radio City followed the established format of introducing an oldies station - Radio City Gold 1548, which itself was later rebranded as part of the Magic AM network to Magic 1548. In 2015, the Magic AM stations were rebranded back to their local identities as part of the new Bauer City 2 network, and Magic 1548, which became Radio City 2 before switching frequencies with Radio City Talk.

== Coverage area ==
The station was targeted for listeners in North Wales, Cheshire and Liverpool however extensive broadcasts could be heard in Greater Manchester and Staffordshire.

== Demise ==
On 7 May 2020, Bauer Radio announced that Radio City Talk would cease broadcasting later in the month. Bauer had said that due to low listening figures, it was deemed not financially viable to keep the station running. On 29 May 2020, Radio City Talk presented its last weekday programming schedule. Its final broadcasting date was 31 May 2020. The last song to be played was Hey Jude by The Beatles and at 12:06 a.m. on 1 June 2020, Radio City Talk went silent.
