= Orrell, Greater Manchester =

Coordinates: 53.5319°N 2.7082°W

Orrell
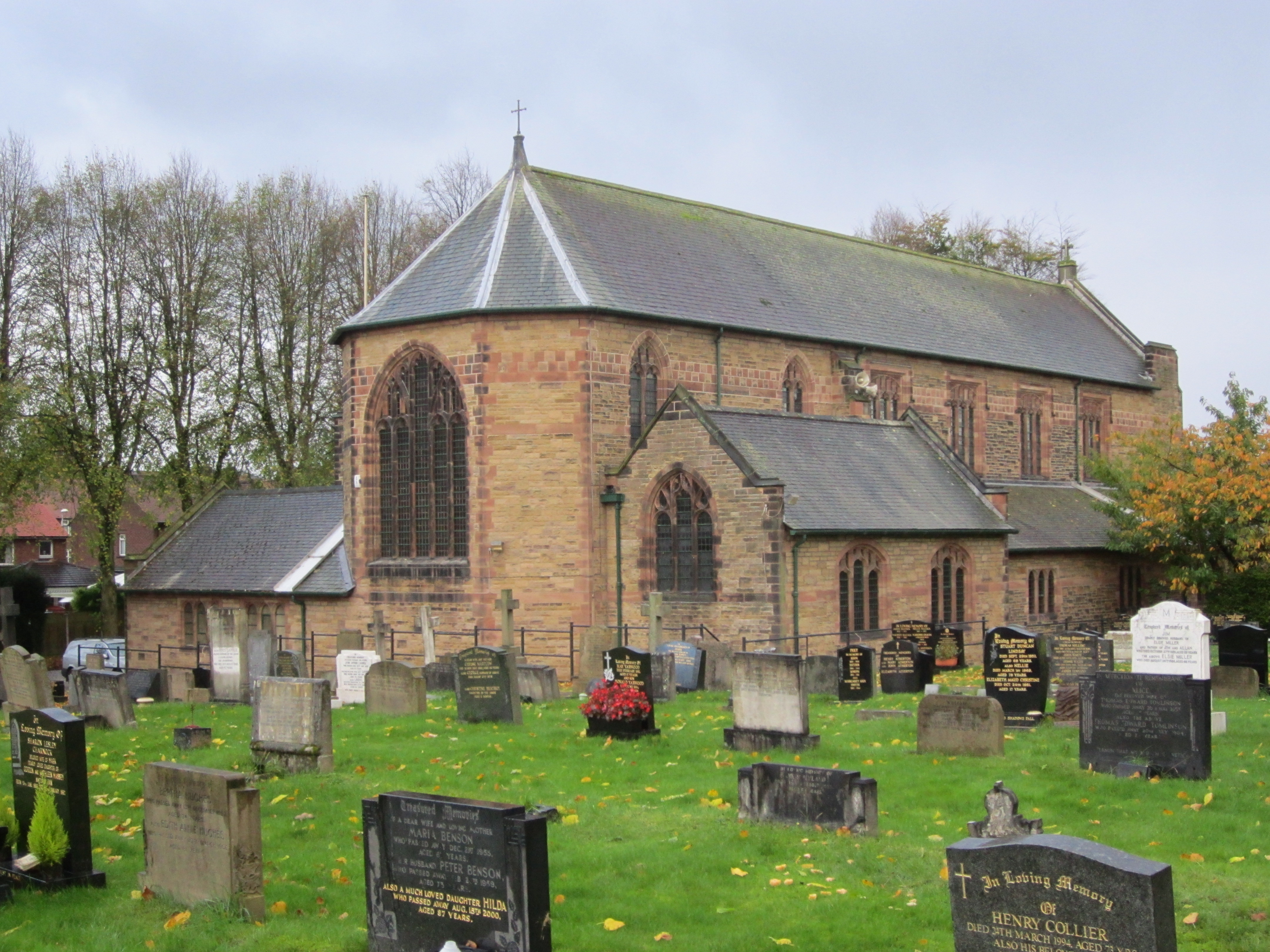
- St. Luke's Parish Church

- Location within Greater Manchester
- Population: 12,000
- OS grid reference: SD531051
- Metropolitan borough: Wigan
- Metropolitan county: Greater Manchester
- Region: North West
- Country: England
- Sovereign state: United Kingdom
- Post town: WIGAN
- Postcode district: WN5
- Dialling code: 01942; 01695
- Police: Greater Manchester
- Fire: Greater Manchester
- Ambulance: North West
- UK Parliament: Makerfield

Orrell is a suburb of Wigan in the Metropolitan Borough of Wigan, Greater Manchester, England. The population of the ward had fallen at the 2011 Census to 11,513. The area lies 3 miles (4.8 km) to the west of Wigan town centre. The area is contiguous with Pemberton.

Historically in Lancashire, Orrell was a centre of the coal mining industry, though today no evidence of the area's industrial past is present. The electoral ward of Orrell has a population of 11,203, however, the ward covers a larger area also containing parts of Billinge and Winstanley.

== History ==
Orrell derives from the Anglo Saxon ora and hyll, a hill where ore is dug. It has been variously recorded as Horul in 1212, Orel in 1292, Orhull in 1294 and Orul in 1307 and subsequently known as Orrell-in-Makerfield. It was the extreme north-west berewick of the manor of Newton-in-Makerfield before the Norman Conquest of England.

In 1212 the manor was held by Richard de Orrell but became divided and was acquired by the Hollands of Upholland and descended to the Lovels and subsequently to the Earls of Derby. After several changes of ownership it belonged to Roger Leigh of Aspull. Orrell was the family name of a number of landowners in the area and branches of the Orrell family held small estates here for centuries. There are records from 1558 showing William Orrell living at Orrell Hall.

=== Industrial history ===
The coal measures of the Lancashire Coalfield were mined extensively at the Orrell Collieries between 1740 and 1850. A tramroad modelled on John Blenkinsop's railway at Middleton was built in 1812 from the pits to the Leeds and Liverpool Canal at Crooke. Robert Daglish was its engineer. A cottage nail making industry flourished at the same time. Another employer was the Sandbrook cotton mill where raw cotton was spun into thread. No significant industry is present in the area which is primarily a residential suburb for commuters.

=== Post war ===
Divided by the M6 and M58 motorways, the area has developed two unofficial 'sections': the southern section with railway station and Orrell Rugby Union Club's former 'Edge Hall Road; and Orrell Post, at the northern side of the M58. The original Orrell 'post', signifying a halt on the turnpike road, is still outside the Stag public house at a crossroads. The area's proximity to Wigan town centre and its position at a junction of the M6, make it an attractive location from which to commute.

== Governance ==
From 1894 to 1974, Orrell formed its own local government district; Orrell Urban District, and lay within the administrative county of Lancashire.

With the coming of local government reforms in 1974, Orrell's urban district status was abolished and the area was amalgamated into the newly formed Metropolitan Borough of Wigan, in Greater Manchester.

Orrell forms part of the Makerfield parliamentary constituency, which is represented in the House of Commons by Labour Member of Parliament, Andy Burnham, since 2026.

== Geography ==
The area's northern section surrounds junction 26 of the M6 motorway. The M6 motorway passes north-south through the area and the section of Orrell to the east of the M6 directly adjoins the district of Pemberton. Orrell and Pemberton form one contiguous residential area.

Orrell is one of twenty five electoral wards that make up the Metropolitan Borough of Wigan. It is the most westerly ward in Greater Manchester. Orrell is part of the Wigan Urban Area.

== Education ==
St John Rigby College is situated at the northern edge of the Orrell area. St Peter's Catholic High School consistently top of the Wigan schools' league table is located on the adjacent road to Orrell Library. Dean Trust Wigan is located on the eastern side of the M6 Motorway.

== Community facilities ==
Orrell Library used to be located on Orrell Road but was closed in March 2010 and moved to the new nearby Abraham Guest High School, despite local attempts to keep the original site open. The former Orrell Library building on Orrell Road is now home to the local branch of 'Book Cycle', a volunteer-run community facility that allows users to exchange books for a small donation.

To the south of the area is Orrell Water Park, a disused water storage reservoir, which has now been turned to leisure use and attracts walkers, fishermen and picnickers.

The broadcasting studios of Wish FM, radio for the Wigan/St Helens area, were located in the area. on the eastern side of the M6. Wish FM discontinued its broadcast in 2020 when it merged with a number of other local stations to form Greatest Hits Radio North West. Its former studio building is now home to a training company, Expanse Learning.

== Transport ==
The area's principal road is the A577-Boothstown to Ormskirk. The M6 motorway runs north-south through the area. The easily accessible East Lancashire Road and M62 give access to Salford and Manchester. The M58 provides the Wigan area with a link to West Lancashire and the Metropolitan Borough of Sefton and the areas to the north the City of Liverpool. It was proposed that the Orrell area (Junction 26 of the M6) be the starting point of the A5225 Wigan and Hindley bypass road linking the M6 and the M58 with the M61 at Bolton.

Orrell railway station is located at the southern section of the area providing services eastbound to Manchester Victoria (passing through Wigan Wallgate) and westbound to Headbolt Lane, Kirkby (passing through Upholland and Rainford stations) connecting with Merseyrail Northern Line services.

== Sport ==
The area is the home of South Lancashire & Cheshire Division 2 side Orrell Rugby Union Football Club. The senior and junior academy sides of Wigan RLFC rugby league club play their home games at Edge Hall Road. Orrell left Edge Hall Road at the end of the 2006–07 season and began playing at St John Rigby College.

The Orrell Otters Football Club currently ply their trade in the South Lancs Counties Second Division after winning the Third Division championship in their debut season, and are also the current Houghton Memorial Cup holders after winning the trophy in 2010.

== Gallery ==
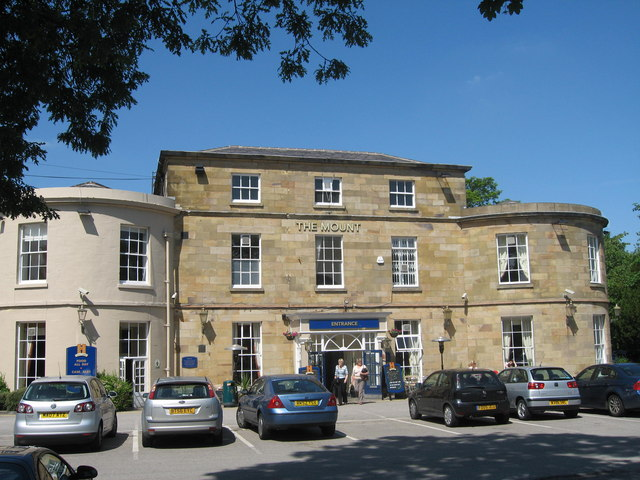
The Mount public house

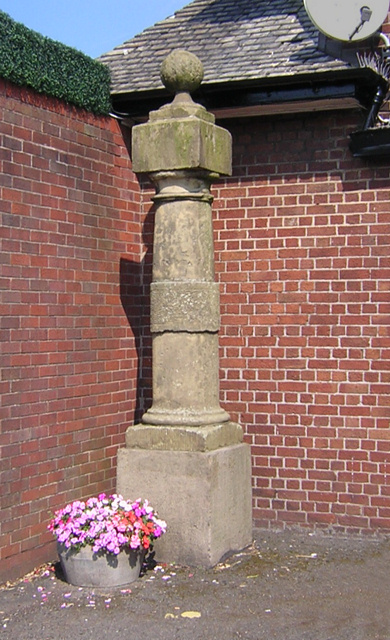
The post at Orrell Post

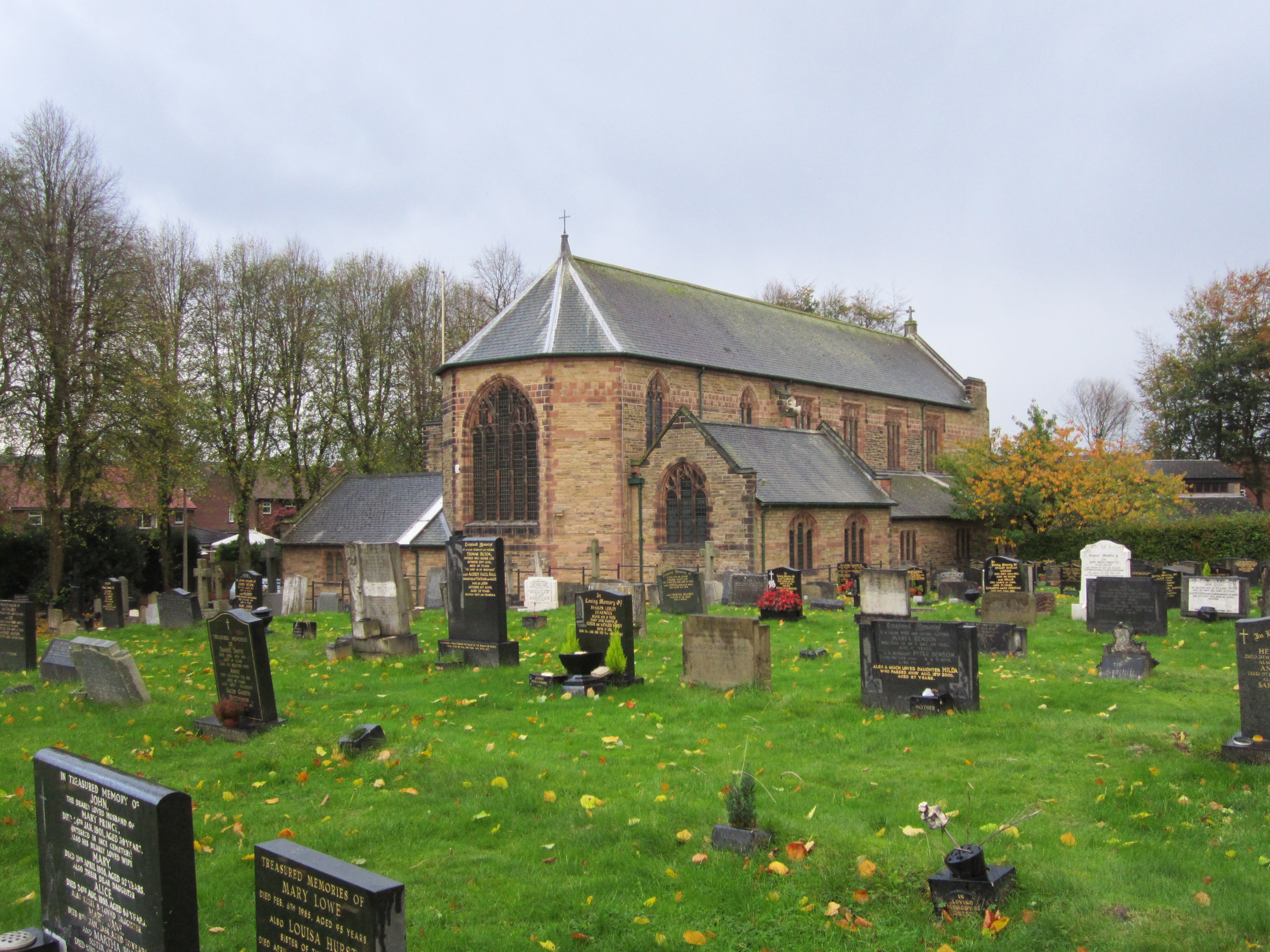
The parish church of St Luke's

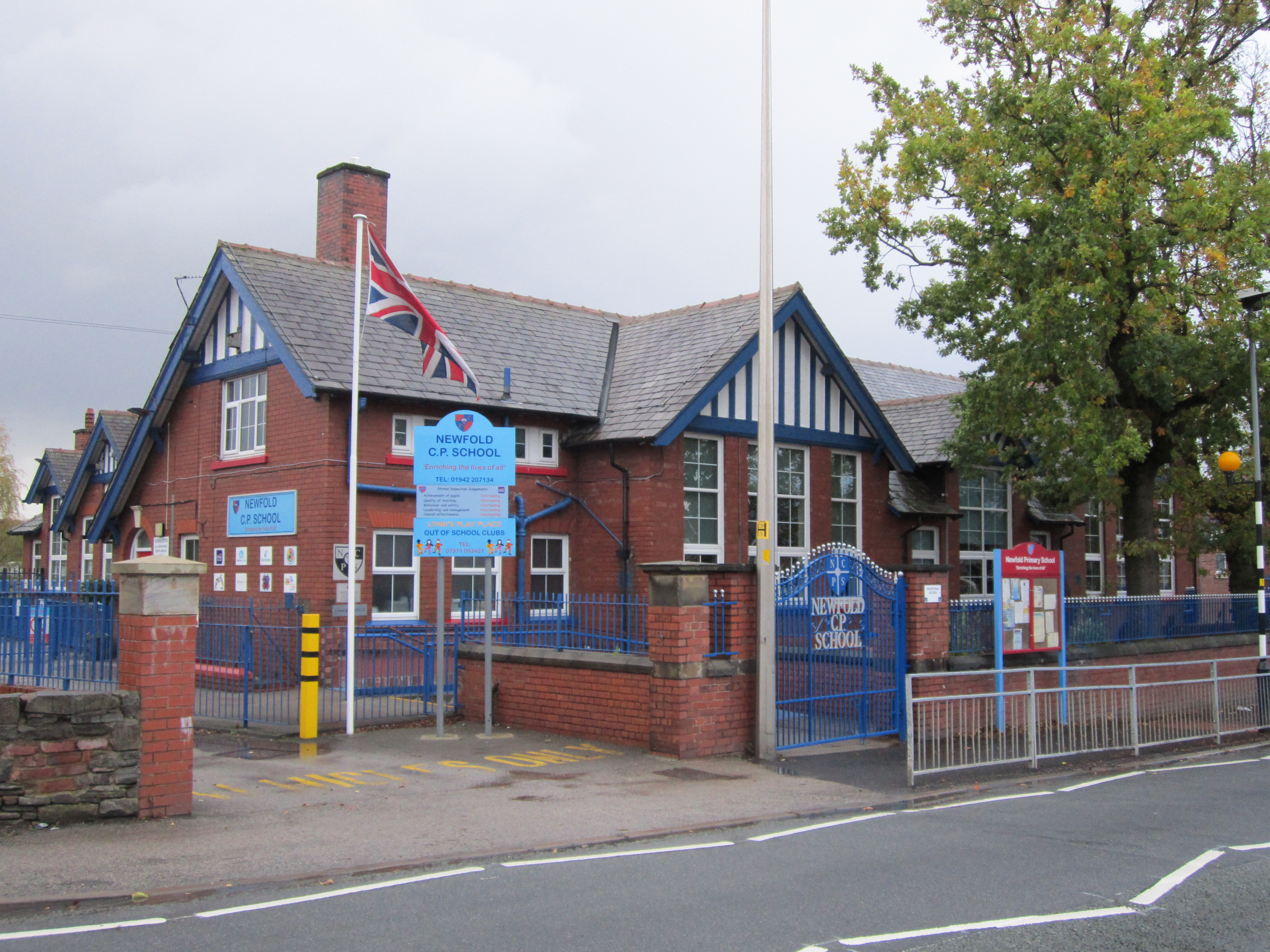
Newfold C.P. School

== See also ==
- Listed buildings in Orrell, Greater Manchester
- St Luke's Church, Orrell
