= Darryl Morris (presenter) =

English radio broadcaster

- Born: 7 September 1990 (age 36); Bolton, England
- Occupations: Broadcaster, journalist
- Known for: Radio, documentaries
- Website: www.darrylmorris.co.uk

Darryl Morris (born 7 September 1990) is an English radio broadcaster and documentary maker. He currently hosts the weekend late show on national speech radio station Times Radio.

Morris was raised in Horwich and attended Rivington and Blackrod High School.

Before joining Times Radio, he presented the Early Breakfast show on sister station Talkradio.

Morris started out on school radio, and was a youth presenter on the 4 episodes of BBC World Service series Generation Next. He had brief stints at Manchester-based radio station Key 103 and digital station The Hits Radio, as well as working for BBC Radio Manchester as a researcher.

In 2008, Morris appeared in Chicago Town Pizza television adverts.

In 2009, he joined Global Radio to work across the now rebranded Capital Manchester, formerly Galaxy Manchester, and XFM Manchester.

On 24 June 2012 he returned to Bauer Radio to host the simulcast The Late Show (Key 103, Rock FM and The Hits Radio).

He hosted Darryl Morris in the Morning, the breakfast show on The Hits and Bauer City 3 from 2013 until August 2015. He also hosted a Saturday talk show on Liverpool's Radio City Talk.

In 2015, Darryl Morris in the Morning moved for a short run on Rock FM, before Morris become presenter of Bauer Media Group's simulcast Evening Show in July 2016, broadcasting on 9 different radio stations including Key 103, Radio City and Metro Radio.

Morris was one of the first journalists on the scene of the Manchester Arena bombing, covering the event, its aftermath and writing extensively about its impact.

In 2019, Morris left music radio and moved into speech radio, joining national speech station Talkradio to host the overnight show before later moving to Early Breakfast and the weekend Evening Show.

In 2021, he produced and presented a documentary about manipulative web design, Dark Patterns, for BBC World Service.

In February 2023, Morris investigated the events surrounding the disappearance of Nicola Bulley, focusing on the role of TikTok sleuths and "grief junkies" who flocked to the scene.

In 2024, he presented a documentary about a man who claims to be God, God Next Door, for BBC Radio 4. Morris spent several years with the man and with the group of people who follow him.

In 2025, he presented the documentary We Are Not a Conspiracy School, in which he met and investigated a group of parents accused of running an illegal school for conspiracy theorists.

Morris has talked extensively about his childhood diagnosis of ADHD and the impact it has on his life and work. In 2024, he hosted an episode of The Story Podcast about the speculation surrounding over-diagnosis of ADHD.

He has had bylines in The Times, Grazia, and HuffPost and was a regular columnist for the Lancashire Evening Post. He occasionally contributes on BBC News, Sky News and Good Morning Britain, Jeremy Vine on Channel 5.

At the beginning of 2026 Morris took over the presenting duties on the YouTube programme History Undone on Times Radio where he replaced James Hanson. Morris in turn was replaced by Fergus McPhee in the spring of that year.

Morris lives in Manchester and London and is a season-ticket holder for Bolton Wanderers Football Club.
