= Brian Inglis =

Irish journalist, historian & TV presenter

- Inglis in a publicity shot for All Our Yesterdays
- Born: Brian St John Inglis; 31 July 1916; Dublin, Ireland
- Died: 11 February 1993 (aged 76); London, England
- Education: Magdalen College, Oxford; Trinity College, Dublin
- Occupations: Journalist; historian; author; television presenter
- Spouse: Ruth Wodeson (m. 1958; div. 1974)
- Children: 2

Brian St John Inglis (31 July 1916 – 11 February 1993) was an Irish journalist, historian and television presenter who worked in London. He was born in Dublin, Ireland, and retained an interest in Irish history and politics. He was best known to people in Britain as the presenter of All Our Yesterdays, a television review of events exactly 25 years previously, as seen in newsreels, newspaper articles, etc. He also presented the weekly review of newspapers known as What the Papers Say.

He joined the staff of The Spectator in 1954, and became editor in 1959, soon afterwards hiring the young Bernard Levin to write for the magazine. He continued as editor until 1962. He also had interests in the paranormal and alternative medicine.

== Early life and education ==
Brian St John Inglis was born in Dublin, into a middle-class professional Church of Ireland family. His father was Sir Claude Cavendish Inglis FRS, a hydraulic engineer who founded the Hydraulic Research Station, Wallingford; his mother was Lady Vera Inglis, née Blood. His maternal grandmother lived at the closed society of Malahide, north County Dublin. He spent his early years in India with his parents, before beginning boarding school in England. He was a grandson of J. R. Blood and thus a likely descendant of Thomas Blood, who attempted (unsuccessfully) to steal the British Crown Jewels. He found the life he was born into oppressive in its obsession with custom, style, privilege, respectability, and ostracism. Since the people around him were regarded as English invaders by the local Irish Catholics, and as Irish by society over in Britain, he felt alienated from, or was rejected by, everyone to whom he might claim a connection.

He attended the Dragon School in Oxford, Shrewsbury School, Trinity College, Dublin, and Magdalen College, Oxford. After service in the RAF during World War II, he studied for a PhD in History at Trinity College, Dublin. His thesis was the basis for his first book, Freedom of the Press in Ireland (1954).

== Adult life ==
He married Ruth Woodeson, the writer, in 1958, and they had a son and a daughter, later separating in 1972 and divorcing two years later. In 1962, he published his first memoir West Briton (a pejorative reference to the Anglo-Irish upper classes in Ireland, from whose cultural influence Inglis never entirely escaped). He was a founding member of the British-Irish Association, which became the British Association for Irish Studies.

In 1975, he wrote and narrated a unique sound archive of World War II for record label Cameo Classics, entitled Sounds of All Our Yesterdays. It was researched by his friend Bill Grundy, a producer of the Granada TV series All Our Yesterdays, which Inglis had presented from 1962 until 1973.

His interest in the paranormal began while working at The Spectator. In 1978, Inglis published Natural and Supernatural. With Arthur Koestler and Tony Bloomfield he co-founded the KIB Society to sponsor paranormal research (which was later renamed the Koestler Parapsychology Unit). He published a work on people who enter trance states (Trance: A Natural History of Altered States of Mind) and his last work, written as a tribute to Koestler dealt with the subject of synchronicity. It was entitled Coincidence: A Matter of Chance or Synchronicity?.

Inglis was a member of the Society for Psychical Research. He was a believer in clairvoyance and precognition. He claimed to have experienced precognitive dreams and was convinced Uri Geller had psychic powers. Inglis was a consultant on the 1981 Thames Television programme Mind Over Matter.

He published his final memoir, Downstart, in 1990. The title is taken from the preface to Immaturity by George Bernard Shaw, and is a play on the word upstart, as in one who pretends to a higher station in life than is merited.

== Reception ==
=== History ===
The historian J. C. Beckett gave Inglis's book The Story of Ireland (1956) a positive review and described it as an "attractive historical introduction to contemporary Ireland".

Inglis described the conditions of the poor during the Industrial Revolution in his book the Men of Conscience (1971). In a review Brian Heeney wrote whilst not entirely objective it is a "well-written tract, full of lore about the masses who suffered and the classes who oppressed them." Peter Stearns wrote that the book was well written but contained grand pretensions which make it bad history.

Inglis's biography of Roger Casement was well received. Michael McInerney described his research as comprehensive and "his approach sympathetic yet penetrating." The historian Patrick O'Farrell wrote the biography is of "considerable historiographical significance."

Inglis wrote about war over the opium trade in his book The Opium War (1976). Donald Gould gave the book a positive review describing it as a fascinating account. However, the historian John Fairbank concluded the book offered nothing new and covered less detail than other writers on the subject such as Peter Fay about warfare. Jacques Downs wrote the book was a respectable contribution to the subject but Fay's book would be preferred by historians.

=== Medicine ===
Inglis's book Revolution in Medicine (1958) is a criticism of modern medicine and its materialistic viewpoints and a defense of psychosomatic medicine and psychotherapy. William Sargant in the British Medical Journal wrote that the book was a case of special pleading and some of the information that Inglis cited was misleading. Sargant wrote although Inglis had criticized medicine for its preoccupation with physical treatment and psychotherapy should not be neglected it is only the "new empirical and mechanistic physical treatments" that have provided effective relief for suffering of many patients.

Glenn Sonnedecker in the American Scientist gave Inglis's book The Forbidden Game: A Social History of Drugs (1975) a negative review. Sonnedecker wrote that Inglis had made assumptions and conclusions without evidence and there was an uncritical use of sources. Inglis in his book The Diseases of Civilization (1981) attacked orthodox medical practice. Frank Lesser wrote the book was well referenced. However, the book received a negative review by Charles Fletcher in the Journal of Medical Ethics who wrote Inglis was biased and his information was often inaccurate.

Inglis defended non-orthodox forms of treatment for back pain in his book The Book of the Back (1978). Malcolm Jayson criticised the book claiming it was filled with errors and Inglis was too uncritically accepting of alternative therapies.

=== Psychical research ===
Michael McVaugh positively reviewed Inglis's book Natural and Supernatural (1977) describing it as a "thoroughly serious study" and the reader "will acquire an excellent understanding of the frame of mind of the informed psychical researcher in the early twentieth century." Karl Sabbagh gave the book a mixed review but concluded that the paranormal phenomena that Inglis endorsed was in contradiction to major tenets of modern science.

In 1978, the science writer John Emsley published an article on thallium which suggested that William Crookes endorsement of the medium Florence Cook and spiritualism may have been the result of mental disturbance caused by thallium poisoning. Inglis responded claiming Emsley's suggestion was a smear story and that Crookes's mind being affected by thallium poisoning was not true because at the same time as his psychical research he was conducting valuable scientific work.

Inglis wrote a negative review of C. E. M. Hansel's sceptical book on extrasensory perception and argued he had used discredited sources. Leonard Newman responded in the New Scientist stating Inglis had misrepresented the source material. Hansel wrote that Inglis had ignored the main part of his book and his claim that he had used "works long discredited" was untruthful.

In the early 1980s, Inglis was involved in a dispute with the skeptic Ruth Brandon over the mediumship of Daniel Dunglas Home in the New Scientist magazine.

Inglis described psychical research between the two world wars in his book Science and Parascience (1984). In a review Ivor Grattan-Guinness wrote it would be of interest to the "historian of science not only for its account of developments in one of the fringes of science but also for its case studies of conduct, ethical and unethical, by both scientists and outsiders." Arne Hessenbruch wrote the book contained valuable information but "the readability and scholarship are marred by awkwardly placed and often erroneous references."

Inglis in his book The Hidden Power (1986) invoked a conspiracy theory that established scientists have denied and suppressed evidence for the existence of a psi force. Inglis suggested that an underlying psi force could explain biological evolution, extrasensory perception, mediumship, psychokinesis, social behaviour of insects, religious experiences, telepathy amongst other mysteries. According to Inglis the untapped and untamed force sometimes works and sometimes doesn't, depending on the factors involved. Terry Hamblin gave the book a mixed review but criticized the book for endorsing spiritualistic activities such as ectoplasm and table tapping.

In 1988, the magician Bob Couttie criticised Inglis for deliberately ignoring evidence of fraud in mediumship. Couttie wrote that Inglis had not familiarised himself with magician techniques. The parapsychologist D. Scott Rogo complained that Inglis "had a bad habit in his writing of suppressing negative information about psychics and researchers he favored by failing to note cases of fraud that were uncovered."

Science writer Martin Gardner criticized Inglis for making "imbecilic" comments about alleged psychic "pseudopods" from the medium Eusapia Palladino. The physicist John Taylor wrote that Inglis had made remarks about physics that were untutored errors.

== Death ==
On 11 February 1993, Inglis died from a heart attack at the Royal Free Hospital in London, aged 76. He had just finished writing the obituary of his friend and colleague Bill Grundy.

== Publications ==
- Freedom of the Press in Ireland [IHS] (London: Faber & Faber, 1954)
- "Irish Double-Thought", in The Spectator, 188 (7 March 1952), p. 289
- "Smuggled Culture", The Spectator, 188 (28 November 1952), p. 726
- The Story of Ireland (London: Faber, 1956; second edition 1965; third edition 1970)
- Moran of the Leader, in Castleknock Chronicle (1956) [text of Thomas Davis Lecture];
- Revolution in Medicine (London: Hutchinson, 1958)
- "Moran of the Leader and Ryan of the Irish Peasant", in The Shaping of Modern Ireland, Conor Cruise O'Brien, ed., (London: Routledge & Kegan Paul, 1960);
- John Bull's Schooldays (London: Hutchinson, 1961)
- West Briton (London: Faber and Faber, 1962)
- Fringe Medicine (London: Faber and Faber, 1964)
- A History of Medicine ( Cleveland, OH: World Publishing Co., 1965)
- Roger Casement (London: Hodder & Stoughton, 1973)
- The Forbidden Game: A Social History of Drugs (London: Hodder & Stoughton, 1975)
- The Opium War (London: Hodder & Stoughton, 1976), ISBN 0-340-19390-5
- The Book of the Back (New York: Hearst Books, 1978)
- Natural and Supernatural: A History of the Paranormal from the Earliest Times To 1914 (London: Hodder & Stoughton, 1978)
- Natural Medicine (London: Collins, 1979)
- The Diseases of Civilisation (London: Hodder & Stoughton, 1981)
- Science and Parascience: A History of the Paranormal, 1914–1939 (London: Hodder & Stoughton, 1984)
- The Hidden Power (London: Jonathan Cape, 1986)
- The Paranormal: An Encyclopedia of Psychic Phenomena (London: Paladin, 1986)
- The Power of Dreams (London: HarperCollins Publishers Ltd, 1987)
- The Unknown Guest [with Ruth West] (London: Chatto and Windus, 1987)
- Trance: A Natural History of Altered States of Mind (London: Paladin, 1989), ISBN 0-586-08933-0
- Coincidence: A Matter of Chance - or Synchronicity? (London: Hutchinson, 1990)
- Downstart: The Autobiography of Brian Inglis (London: Chatto & Windus, 1990)

== Quotes ==
- On the Irish Famine: "If the British chose not to consider Ireland part of Britain, when such an emergency arose, they could hardly complain if the Irish did likewise" (The Story of Ireland, p. 140)
- "To punish drug takers is like a drunk striking the bleary face it sees in the mirror" (Postscript, The Forbidden Game: A Social History of Drugs (1975))
