= Bill Grundy =

English television presenter (1923–1993)

- Grundy in 1978
- Born: William Grundy; 18 May 1923; Manchester, Lancashire, England
- Died: 9 February 1993 (aged 69); Stockport, England
- Occupations: Journalist; broadcaster
- Years active: 1956-1986
- Known for: Today interview with the Sex Pistols
- Children: 6 (including Tim)

William Grundy (18 May 1923 – 9 February 1993) was an English journalist and broadcaster. As the host of Today, a regional magazine programme on Thames Television in London, he gained national attention for an interview with the Sex Pistols in 1976, during which the band swore and traded insults with him on live television. The interview effectively destroyed Grundy's career, elevated the Sex Pistols to notoriety, and signalled the arrival of mainstream punk rock.

== Biography ==
The son of a foreman at Gorton Locomotive Works (Gorton Tank), Grundy was born in Manchester in 1923 and educated at the University of Manchester, where he read geology.

He began his career as a geologist and as a part-time journalist. When Granada Television began broadcasting in May 1956, Grundy auditioned for the post of newsreader, which at first he held in tandem with his geological work. During his time at Granada, he established himself as a reporter and presenter for the station's regional programming, including People and Places, Northern Newscast, Scene at 6:30 and Granada in the North, alongside such contemporaries as Gay Byrne, Chris Kelly, Michael Parkinson, Mike Scott and Brian Trueman.

On the night of the assassination of John F. Kennedy, Grundy anchored a late-night news special for the Granada region, alongside Mike Scott, who broke the story on Scene at 6:30 that evening. He also fronted Granada's coverage of elections, the main political party conferences and the Trades Union Congress.

Grundy was also a producer at Granada, working on the long-running history series All Our Yesterdays and early editions of the current affairs programme World in Action.

In 1967, he produced a children's drama series, The Flower of Gloster (1967). The serial, about four youngsters who take a narrow boat from North Wales to London, was broadcast as a 13-part weekly series. Based on a 1911 book of the same name by E. Temple Thurston, it was Granada TV's first venture into colour. Grundy also wrote a book of the same name, basically an updated version of Thurston's original.

As well as writing a regular column for Punch magazine, Grundy played himself in the 1974 film version of Man About the House, and hosted the Today show in London, after moving from Granada to Thames. In 1975, he presented an educational programme called The Land for Independent Television's schools and colleges programming.

== The Today incident ==
=== Background ===
Queen were booked for the Today show of 1 December 1976, but they cancelled their appearance at the last minute due to vocalist Freddie Mercury needing emergency dental surgery. They were replaced by the punk band the Sex Pistols, appearing at short notice accompanied by their entourage. The show was broadcast live and uncensored on weekdays in the early evening, a time when spoken obscenities were forbidden.

=== The interview ===
A screenshot from Grundy's interview with the Sex Pistols on the Today show

The interview began with Grundy introducing the band, stating "they are as drunk as I am", although Grundy later denied to the press that he had been intoxicated during the interview.

The interview resumed following a playing of the music video for the song "Anarchy in the U.K.". Grundy was dismissive towards the band, speaking to viewers instead of directly to them and referring to them as "that group" in his challenging of what he felt was hypocrisy over the philosophy of punk. Initially, he received mocking but relatively innocuous responses from bassist Glen Matlock.

Grundy said "I am told... that that group... have received £40,000 from a record company.... Doesn't that seem to be slightly opposed to their anti-materialistic view of life?" Matlock replied "No, the more the merrier." When Grundy asked the band to explain further, Steve Jones quipped: "We fuckin' spent it, ain't we?" Grundy did not comment on the profanity but responded "I don't know; have you?" Matlock said that the money had all gone "down the boozer". Grundy then asked the band "Now, I want to know one thing: are you serious? or are you just trying to make me laugh?" in reference to their music, comparing them to musicians such as Beethoven, Mozart, Bach and Brahms. Johnny Rotten (John Lydon) sarcastically replied "They're all heroes of ours, ain't they?". When Grundy enquired further, Lydon went on, stating "Oh, they're wonderful people; Oh yes, they really turn us on!" Grundy responded with, "Well, suppose they turn other people on?", to which Lydon dismissively remarked, "That's just their tough shit." When challenged by Grundy, Lydon said, "Nothing – a rude word! Next question." Grundy insisted that Lydon repeat what he had said. When Lydon did so – "Shit" – Grundy tauntingly retorted, "Good heavens, you frighten me to death," to which Lydon called him "Siegfried" as Matlock muttered that Grundy was "like [a] dad... or [a] granddad."

Grundy then turned his attention to the female members of the band's entourage, known as the Bromley Contingent, which included Siouxsie Sioux. He asked, "What about you girls behind? Are you worried, or are you just enjoying yourself?" Sioux responded, "Enjoying myself". Grundy responded "Are you?", to which she and Simone Thomas chorused, "Yeah." Grundy responded, "Ah, that's what I thought you were doing." That prompted a large exhalation from a band member. Sioux said, "I always wanted to meet you", to which Grundy responded by saying, "Did you really? We'll meet afterwards, shall we?" Interpreting this as a sexual comment, Jones began openly insulting Grundy, calling him a "dirty sod" and a "dirty old man". Grundy told Jones "Go on, you've got another five seconds, say something outrageous", a challenge that Jones met by calling Grundy a "dirty bastard" and a "dirty fucker". Grundy responded, "What a clever boy!", and Jones added, "What a fucking rotter!" As the show ended and the credits rolled, Grundy mouthed, "Oh shit" as the band began dancing to the closing theme.

=== Immediate aftermath ===
Although Today was only a regional programme for London, it became a national story due to coverage and comment by the tabloid press. As a result, Grundy was suspended for two weeks. The head of programming for Thames, Jeremy Isaacs, described the incident as "a gross error of judgement" leading from "inexcusably sloppy journalism". The commercial television regulator of the day, the Independent Broadcasting Authority (IBA) accepted the franchise holder's argument that the incident could not have been prevented. In his defence, Grundy said he had set out "to prove that these louts were a foul-mouthed set of yobs. And that is what I did prove". Today was cancelled two months later. In a 2008 poll conducted by FremantleMedia, at that point Thames's parent company, the Today show interview was the most requested TV clip ever.

== Post-Today ==
The broadcast harmed Grundy's television career. By 1979, he was presenting a book review programme, A Better Read, broadcast on Sunday mornings.

His slot on What the Papers Say in the early 1980s was his last on network television, although he continued to present on BBC North West on such regional shows as Sweet and Sour and The Lancashire Lads into the mid-1980s. He also appeared as an interviewer in ITV's adaptation of A Kind of Loving in 1982 and worked on school programmes for Granada, including a stint presenting Politics - What's It All About?.

In July 1986, Grundy was lead compere for the Festival of the Tenth Summer at the newly opened Greater Manchester Exhibition Centre (GMEX), a week-long celebration of the anniversary of the Sex Pistols' performance at the Lesser Free Trade Hall. Grundy was chosen for the role by organiser Tony Wilson, in a nod to the Today incident and Grundy's association with the Sex Pistols.

Grundy died of a heart attack at a nursing home in Stockport, on 9 February 1993, aged 69.

He had four sons and two daughters. His son Tim Grundy was a radio presenter on Piccadilly Radio and Key 103, and a TV presenter, until his death in 2009.

Michael Parkinson, who worked with Grundy at Granada in the 1960s, described him as:

A difficult man to keep sober, but not to produce. He was one of the best front men I ever worked with...At his best he was a superb forensic interviewer...sadly, as his career drifted, he let drink overwhelm his personality.
