= Richard Best, Baron Best =

British peer (born 1945)

The Right Honourable The Lord Best OBE DL FAcSS
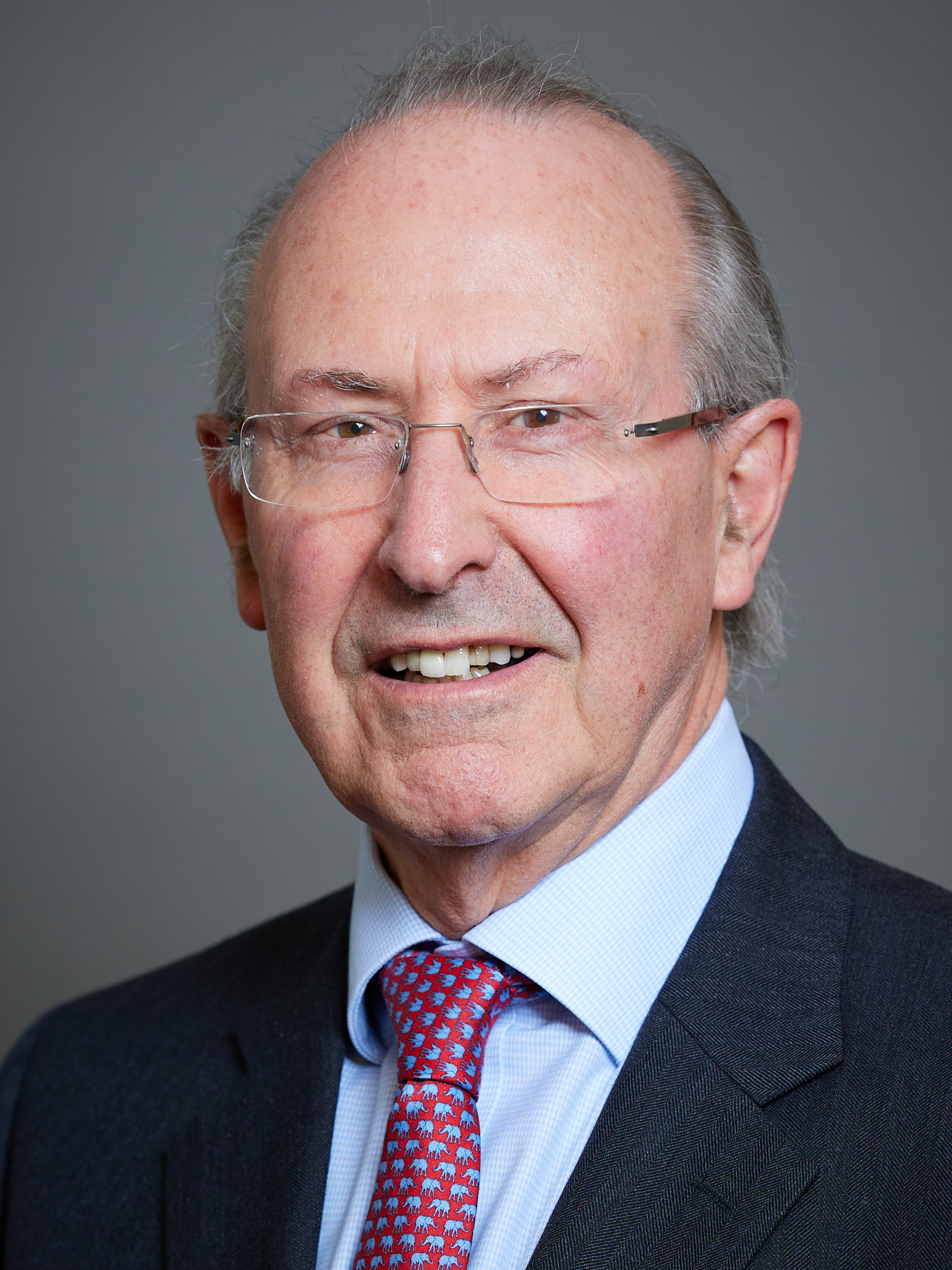
- Lord Best in 2022

Member of the House of Lords
- Lord Temporal
- Life peerage 4 June 2001

Personal details
- Born: 22 June 1945 (age 81)
- Party: None (crossbencher)
- Children: 4, including Will
- Education: University of Nottingham

Richard Stuart Best, Baron Best, OBE, DL, FAcSS (born 22 June 1945) is an independent Crossbench Member of the House of Lords with a special interest in housing issues.

== Biography ==
The son of Walter Best DL and Frances Chignell, Best was educated at Shrewsbury School and the University of Nottingham. He married Ima Akpan in 1970, divorcing in 1976. Best married Belinda Stemp in 1978 and has two daughters and two sons with his two wives. One of his sons, Will Best, is a television presenter.

From 1970 to 1973, Best served as director of the British Churches Housing Trust, then of the National Federation of Housing Associations 1973–1988. From 1988 to December 2006, he led the Joseph Rowntree Foundation and Joseph Rowntree Housing Trust. He has written extensively on housing and chaired commissions on housing for Northern Ireland, Westminster, Birmingham, Brent, Glasgow and Hull.

Best is a member of the House of Lords Industry and Regulators Committee, and has previously chaired the House of Lords Audit Committee between 2005 and 2010 and the Select Committee on Communications between 2014 and 2017. Lord Best has previously sat on the Built Environment Committee, EU Home Affairs Committee and the Economic Affairs Committee. He is also president of the Sustainable Energy Association and co-chairs the All Party Parliamentary Group on Housing and Care for Older People. Lord Best served as chair of the Hanover Housing Association 2006–2015, and chaired The Property Ombudsman between 2009 and 2017. He was president of the Local Government Association 2007–2016, Commissioner of the Rural Development Commission 1989–1998, trustee and treasurer of the Royal Society of Arts 2007–2014, and a member of the NCVO Advisory Council 2008–2016. Lord Best has also chaired the Oxford University Commission on Creating Healthy Cities (2022), the Affordable Housing Commission (2020) and the Devon Housing Commission (2024).

On 4 June 2001, Best was created a life peer as Baron Best, of Godmanstone in the County of Dorset. He sits as an independent crossbencher in the House of Lords.

== Honours ==
Best was appointed an Officer of the Order of the British Empire (OBE) in the 1988 New Year Honours.

He has been awarded honorary degrees from the Universities of York and Sheffield. In September 2014, he was elected a Fellow of the Academy of Social Sciences. He is also an Honorary Fellow of the RIBA. He is a Deputy Lieutenant (DL) of North Yorkshire.

Orders of precedence in the United Kingdom
Preceded by The Lord Ashcroft	Gentlemen; Baron Best	Followed by The Lord Rooker
