= Airmageddon =

- Genre: Game show; Comedy (series 2)
- Created by: Steve Carsey
- Presented by: Will Best; Rachel Stringer
- Narrated by: Colin Bryce (series 1); Jim Howick (series 2)
- Composer: Dobs Vye
- Countries of origin: United Kingdom; Canada
- Original language: English
- No. of series: 2
- No. of episodes: 22 (inc. 4 specials)

Production
- Executive producers: Steve Carsey; Ken Faier; Asaph Fipke; Richard Rowe; Hugh Lawton
- Producer: Andrew Norgate
- Editors: Ylva Garnert (series 1); Scott Edwards (series 2)
- Running time: 30 minutes
- Production companies: Conceive Media; DHX Media

Original release
- Network: CBBC (UK); Family Channel (Canada)
- Release: 20 February – 18 December 2016

Related
- Robot Wars

Airmageddon is a children's technological game show that aired on CBBC from 20 February to 18 December 2016. It was hosted by Will Best and Rachel Stringer. The show involves teams of children using radio-controlled drones.

== Format ==
Airmageddon follows a similar format to the Gauntlet/Trial/Arena format of the first and second series of Robot Wars. The show followed eight heats, two semi-finals and a grand final.

=== Resident drones ===
==== Air Marshall ====
The referee of the Airena, he announces the start of a challenge and makes sure that things are kept in order.

==== P.I.G. (Personalised Interactive Gyrocopter) ====
A pig-shaped drone who demonstrates how each challenge is done. He'll also oversee challenges if the Air Marshall is out of action.

==== G.U.A.R.D. (Giant Unmanned Aerial Reconnaissance Drone) ====
A large drone built for defensive purposes and is mentioned to not be the smartest.

==== D.R.A.GON (Direct Response Aerial Gyrocopter) ====
A prototype dragon-shaped drone who, true to his namesake, is armed with a flamethrower.

==== W.A.SP (Weaponised Assault Ship) ====
A wasp-shaped drone armed with a spark gun stinger.

==== B.U.G.s (Basic Unmanned Gyrocopter) ====
A trio of bug-shaped drones introduced for the second series to serve as distractive obstacles in the second round.

=== Challenges ===
==== Round 1 ====
===== Airsault Course =====
Information needed

==== Round 2 ====
===== The Drop =====
Information needed

===== Barrage Balloons =====
Information needed

===== Paintball Precision =====
Information needed

===== Slalom =====
Information needed

===== Wall Buster (Semi-finals) =====
Information needed

===== Bubble Burst (Grand final) =====
Information needed

===== Laps =====
Information needed

===== Bottle Bash =====
Information needed

===== Balloon Cutters =====
Information needed

==== Round 3 ====
===== Dogfight =====
Information needed

== Transmissions ==
=== Series ===
Series	Start date	End date	Episodes
1	20 February 2016	16 April 2016	11
2	14 August 2016	23 October 2016	11

=== Specials ===
Date aired	Title
23 April 2016	The Best of Series 1
19 June 2016	Father's Day Special
30 October 2016	The Best of Series 2
18 December 2016	Christmas Special
