= Dance Dance Dance (British TV series) =

British TV series (2017)

- Genre: Talent show
- Presented by: Alesha Dixon; Will Best
- Judges: Ashley Banjo; Tina Landon; Timor Steffens
- Country of origin: United Kingdom
- Original language: English
- No. of series: 1
- No. of episodes: 6

Production
- Running time: 90 minutes (inc. adverts)
- Production company: Talpa

Original release
- Network: ITV
- Release: 8 January – 12 February 2017

Dance Dance Dance is a British talent show that aired on ITV from 8 January 2017 to 12 February 2017. It was presented by Alesha Dixon and Will Best and judged by Ashley Banjo, Tina Landon, and Timor Steffens. It is based on the Dutch series of the same name. The show was cancelled after only one series.

== Cast ==
Series	Presenters		Judges		
1	Alesha Dixon	Will Best	Ashley Banjo	Tina Landon	Timor Steffens

== Celebrities ==
Celebrity	Known for	Partner	Status
Fiona Wade	Emmerdale actress	Ronnie Del Barrio	Eliminated 1st on 22 January 2017
Jess Wright	The Only Way Is Essex star	Duane Lamonte	Eliminated 2nd on 29 January 2017
JB Gill	Former JLS singer	Chloe Gill	Eliminated 3rd on 5 February 2017
Lucy-Jo Hudson	Former Coronation Street actress	Rohan Pinnock-Hamilton	Runners-up on 12 February 2017
Jonny Labey	Former EastEnders actor	Chrissy Brooke	Winners on 12 February 2017

== Scoring chart ==
Couple	Place	1	2	3	1+2+3	4	5	6
Jonny & Chrissy	1	53.0	52.0	54.0	159.0	54.0	89.5	120.0
Lucy-Jo & Rohan	2	49.0	51.0	53.0	153.0	54.0	81.5	117.0
JB & Chloe	3	48.0	49.0	49.5	146.5	52.5	81.0	
Jess & Duane	4	48.0	46.5	53.0	147.5	49.0		
Fiona & Ronnie	5	42.0	46.0	48.5	136.5			

Green scores indicate the highest score of the week.
Red scores indicate the lowest score of the week.
indicates the couple eliminated that week
indicates the winning couple
indicates the runner-up couple
indicates the third-place couple

=== Average chart ===
Rank by average	Place	Couple	Total points	Number of dances	Average
1	1	Jonny & Chrissy	422.5	15	28.2
2	2	Lucy-Jo & Rohan	405.5	15	27.0
3	3	JB & Chloe	280.0	11	25.6
4	4	Jess & Duane	196.5	8	24.5
5	5	Fiona & Ronnie	136.5	6	22.7

=== Results summary ===
Couple received the highest score from the judges
Couple who received the lowest score from the judges and was eliminated
Couple received the lowest score from the judges (no elimination)

Weekly results per couple
	Week 1	Week 2	Week 3	Week 4	Week 5	Week 6
Jonny & Chrissy	1st 53.0	1st 52.0	1st 54.0	=1st 54.0	1st 89.5	Winner; 120.0
Lucy-Jo & Rohan	2nd 49.0	2nd 51.0	2nd 53.0	=1st 54.0	2nd 81.5	Runner-up; 117.0
JB & Chloe	=3rd 48.0	3rd 49.0	4th 49.5	3rd 52.5	3rd 81.0	Eliminated (week 5)
Jess & Duane	=3rd 48.0	4th 46.5	3rd 53.0	4th 49.0	Eliminated (week 4)	
Fiona and Ronnie	5th 42.0	5th 46.0	5th 48.5	Eliminated (week 3)		
Eliminated	No Elimination		Fiona & Ronnie; Lowest Judges Score	Jess & Duane; Lowest Judges Score	JB & Chloe; Lowest Judges Score	Lucy-Jo & Rohan; Lowest Judges Score
Eliminated	No Elimination		Fiona & Ronnie; Lowest Judges Score	Jess & Duane; Lowest Judges Score	JB & Chloe; Lowest Judges Score	Jonny & Chrissy; Highest Judges Score

== Score summary ==
The "Order" columns lists the order of appearance each act made for every episode.

=== Week 1 (8 January) ===
Order	Act	Song	Judges' scores			Overall score	Combined score	Leaderboard
Order	Act	Song	Banjo	Landon	Steffens	Overall score	Combined score	Leaderboard
1	Jonny & Chrissy	"Scream" – Michael Jackson and Janet Jackson	8.5	9.0	8.5	26.0	53.0	1st
6	Jonny	"Rock Your Body" – Justin Timberlake	9.0	9.0	9.0	27.0	53.0	1st
2	JB & Chloe	"Thinking Out Loud" – Ed Sheeran	8.0	8.0	7.5	23.5	48.0	=3rd
7	Chloe	"Vogue" – Madonna	8.0	8.0	8.5	24.5	48.0	=3rd
3	Jess & Duane	"Jai Ho! (You Are My Destiny)" – AR Rahman and The Pussycat Dolls	6.5	7.5	7.5	21.5	48.0	=3rd
8	Duane	"OMG" – Usher	8.5	9.0	9.0	26.5	48.0	=3rd
4	Fiona & Ronnie	"(I've Had) The Time of My Life" – Bill Medley and Jennifer Warnes	6.5	6.5	6.5	19.5	42.0	5th
9	Fiona	"Umbrella" – Rihanna	7.5	8.0	7.0	22.5	42.0	5th
5	Lucy-Jo & Rohan	"Everybody (Backstreet's Back)" – Backstreet Boys	7.5	8.5	8.5	24.5	49.0	2nd
10	Lucy-Jo	"Crazy in Love" – Beyoncé	8.0	8.5	8.0	24.5	49.0	2nd

=== Week 2 (15 January) ===
Order	Act	Song	Judges' scores			Overall score	Combined score	Leaderboard
Order	Act	Song	Banjo	Landon	Steffens	Overall score	Combined score	Leaderboard
1	JB & Chloe	"Bye, Bye, Bye" – *NSYNC	7.5	8.0	7.5	23.0	49.0	3rd
6	JB	"Men in Black" – Will Smith	8.5	8.5	9.0	26.0	49.0	3rd
2	Chrissy	"...Baby One More Time" – Britney Spears	8.5	7.5	8.0	24.0	52.0	1st
9	Jonny & Chrissy	"Parachute" – Cheryl Cole	9.5	9.5	9.0	28.0	52.0	1st
3	Lucy-Jo & Rohan	"Shake a Tail Feather" – The Blues Brothers	8.5	8.5	8.5	25.5	51.0	2nd
10	Rohan	"Bad" – Michael Jackson	8.5	8.5	8.5	25.5	51.0	2nd
4	Jess	"Dirrty" – Christina Aguilera	8.0	8.0	8.0	24.0	46.5	4th
7	Jess & Duane	"Party Rock Anthem" – LMFAO	7.5	7.5	7.5	22.5	46.5	4th
5	Fiona & Ronnie	"#thatPower" – Will.i.am Ft. Justin Bieber	8.0	8.0	7.5	23.5	46.0	5th
8	Ronnie	"Livin' La Vida Loca" – Ricky Martin	7.5	7.5	7.5	22.5	46.0	5th

=== Week 3 (22 January) ===
One couple will be eliminated during each show from this point.

Order	Act	Song	Judges' scores			Overall score	Combined score	Leaderboard	Result
Order	Act	Song	Banjo	Landon	Steffens	Overall score	Combined score	Leaderboard	Result
1	Fiona	"Can't Get You Out of My Head" – Kylie Minogue	8.0	9.0	8.5	25.5	48.0	5th	Eliminated
9	Fiona & Ronnie	"Rhythm is a Dancer" – Snap!	7.5	7.5	7.5	22.5	48.0	5th	Eliminated
2	Jonny & Chrissy	"It's Like That" – Run-DMC Vs Jason Nevins	8.0	8.5	8.5	25.0	54.0	1st	Safe
6	Jonny	"Puttin' On The Ritz" – Blue Skies	9.5	10.0	9.5	29.0	54.0	1st	Safe
3	Chloe	"Rhythm Nation" – Janet Jackson	8.5	8.0	8.5	25.0	49.5	4th	Safe
7	JB & Chloe	"Naughty Girl" – Beyoncé	8.5	8.0	8.0	24.5	49.5	4th	Safe
4	Lucy-Jo & Rohan	"Footloose" – Kenny Loggins	8.5	9.5	8.0	26.0	53.0	=2nd	Safe
8	Lucy-Jo	"Bad Romance" – Lady Gaga	9.0	9.0	9.0	27.0	53.0	=2nd	Safe
5	Jess & Duane	"4 Minutes" – Madonna Ft. Justin Timberlake	8.5	8.0	8.5	25.0	53.0	=2nd	Safe
10	Duane	"Billie Jean" – Michael Jackson	9.5	9.5	9.0	28.0	53.0	=2nd	Safe

=== Week 4 (29 January) ===
Order	Act	Song	Judges' scores			Overall score	Combined score	Leaderboard	Result
Order	Act	Song	Banjo	Landon	Steffens	Overall score	Combined score	Leaderboard	Result
1	Jess	"Single Ladies (Put a Ring on It)" – Beyoncé	8.0	7.5	7.5	23.0	49.0	4th	Eliminated
8	Jess & Duane	"El Tango De Roxanne" – Moulin Rouge!	9.0	8.5	8.5	26.0	49.0	4th	Eliminated
2	Lucy-Jo & Rohan	"Candy Man" – Christina Aguilera	9.5	9.0	9.0	27.5	54.0	=1st	Safe
7	Rohan	"Yeah!" – Usher	9.0	9.0	8.5	26.5	54.0	=1st	Safe
3	JB & Chloe	"Remember the Time" – Michael Jackson	8.5	9.0	8.0	25.5	52.5	3rd	Safe
5	JB	"Treasure" – Bruno Mars	9.5	8.5	9.0	27.0	52.5	3rd	Safe
4	Chrissy	"Sorry" – Justin Bieber	9.5	9.0	9.5	28.0	54.0	=1st	Safe
6	Jonny & Chrissy	"Tilted" – Christine and the Queens	8.5	9.0	8.5	26.0	54.0	=1st	Safe

=== Week 5: Semi-final (5 February) ===
Order	Act	Song	Judges' scores			Overall score	Combined score	Leaderboard	Result
Order	Act	Song	Banjo	Landon	Steffens	Overall score	Combined score	Leaderboard	Result
1	Lucy-Jo	"Where Have You Been" – Rihanna	8.5	9.0	8.5	26.0	81.5	2nd	Safe
6	Rohan	"Get Ugly" – Jason Derulo	9.5	9.5	9.5	28.5	81.5	2nd	Safe
9	Lucy-Jo & Rohan	"Rolling in the Deep" – Adele	9.0	9.0	9.0	27.0	81.5	2nd	Safe
2	Jonny & Chrissy	"Me Against the Music" – Britney Spears Ft. Madonna	10.0	10.0	10.0	30.0	89.5	1st	Safe
4	Jonny	"Smooth Criminal" – Michael Jackson	9.5	10.0	10.0	29.5	89.5	1st	Safe
7	Chrissy	"Chandelier" – Sia	10.0	10.0	10.0	30.0	89.5	1st	Safe
3	JB	"Beautiful Monster" – Ne-Yo	9.5	9.0	9.0	27.5	81.0	3rd	Eliminated
5	Chloe	"Sax" – Fleur East	9.0	9.0	9.0	27.0	81.0	3rd	Eliminated
8	JB & Chloe	"WTF (Where They From)" – Missy Elliott Ft. Pharrell Williams	9.0	9.0	8.5	26.5	81.0	3rd	Eliminated

=== Week 6: Final (12 February) ===
Order	Act	Song	Judges' scores			Overall score	Combined score	Leaderboard	Result
Order	Act	Song	Banjo	Landon	Steffens	Overall score	Combined score	Leaderboard	Result
1	Rohan	"Singin' in the Rain" – Gene Kelly	10.0	10.0	9.5	29.5	117.0	2nd	Runners-up
3	Lucy-Jo & Rohan	"Shake a Tail Feather" – The Blues Brothers	9.5	9.5	10.0	29.0	117.0	2nd	Runners-up
5	Lucy-Jo	"Run the World (Girls)" – Beyoncé	10.0	9.5	10.0	29.5	117.0	2nd	Runners-up
7	Lucy-Jo & Rohan	"Love Yourself" – Justin Bieber	9.5	9.5	10.0	29.0	117.0	2nd	Runners-up
2	Jonny	"Caught Up" – Usher	10.0	10.0	10.0	30.0	120.0	1st	Winners
4	Jonny & Chrissy	"Scream" – Michael Jackson and Janet Jackson	10.0	10.0	10.0	30.0	120.0	1st	Winners
6	Chrissy	"Telephone" – Lady Gaga Ft. Beyoncé	10.0	10.0	10.0	30.0	120.0	1st	Winners
8	Jonny & Chrissy	"Try" – Pink	10.0	10.0	10.0	30.0	120.0	1st	Winners

== Ratings ==
Official ratings are taken from BARB. The figures for Episode 5 are not available as they are outside the Top 30 rated programmes for the week.

Episode	Airdate	Official rating (millions incl. HD & +1)	Rank
1	8 January 2017	4.70	16
2	15 January 2017	3.82	26
3	22 January 2017	4.00	19
4	29 January 2017	3.59	26
5	5 February 2017	—N/a	—N/a
6	12 February 2017	3.40	29

== International versions ==
The Dutch format has already been sold to broadcasters in China, Germany, Italy, Poland, Saudi Arabia, Thailand and the UK.

Region/country	Local title	Network	Winners	Judges	Main presenters
Germany	Dance Dance Dance	RTL	Series 1, 2016: Philipp Boy & Bene Mayr; Series 2, 2017: Luca Hänni & Prince Damien	Sophia Thomalla; DJ BoBo; Cale Kllay	Jan Köppen; Nazan Eckes
Italy	Dance Dance Dance	Fox Life / Fox (series 1–2); TV8 (series 2)	Series 1, 2016–17: Clara Alonso & Diego Dominguez; Series 2, 2018: Giulio Berruti & Cristina Marino	Luca Tommassini; Vanessa Incontrada; Deborah Lettieri (2); Daniel Ezralow (2); Former; Timor Steffens (1)	Andrea Delogu; Nicolò De Devitiis (2); Former; Diego Passoni (1)
Netherlands (original format)	Dance Dance Dance	RTL 4 (1–4); SBS6 (5)	Series 1, 2015: Pim Wessels & Pip Pellens; Series 2, 2016: Buddy Vedder & Robin Martens; Series 3, 2017: Marnix Lenselink & Zoey Ivory; Series 4, 2018: Soy Kroon & Holly Mae Brood; Series 5, 2019: O'G3NE	Timor Steffens; Igone de Jongh; Jan Kooijman (5); Former; Dan Karaty (1–4)	Jandino Asporaat (1–3, 5); Wendy van Dijk (5); Former; Chantal Janzen (1–4); Humberto Tan (4)
Poland	Dance Dance Dance	TVP2	Series 1, 2019: Adam Zdrójkowski & Wiktoria Gąsiewska; Series 2, 2020: Pamela Stefanowicz & Mateusz Janusz; Series 3, 2021: Roksana Węgiel & Oliwia Górniak	Ida Nowakowska; Augustin Egurrola (3); Joanna Jędrzejczyk (3); Former; Ewa Chodakowska (1); Robert Kupisz (1–2); Anna Mucha (2)	Małgorzata Tomaszewska (3); Aleksander Sikora (3); Former; Barbara Kurdej-Szatan (1); Tomasz Kammel (1−2); Tamara Gonzalez-Perea (2)
Saudi Arabia	Dance Dance Dance KSA	SBC	Series 1, 2019: ?	Fahed Al Ali; Naser Al Mansour; Rashed Salim; Abdallah Al Harbi	Hamed Al Zuhairi
Thailand	Dance Dance Dance Thailand	LINE TV	Series 1, 2018: ?	Au Auulala; Zyne Kitty K Carlos Hikaru Takanashi	Kathsepsawad Palakawong na Ayuthaya; Ticha Chumma
United Kingdom	Dance Dance Dance	ITV	Series 1, 2017: Jonny Labey & Chrissy Brooke	Ashley Banjo; Tina Landon; Timor Steffens	Alesha Dixon; Will Best

== See also ==
- Dance on television
