= Hits Radio Pride =

British national digital radio station

- Manchester; United Kingdom
- Broadcast area: United Kingdom
- Frequencies: DAB: 10C (Liverpool); 11B (North Cumbria, Wolverhampton & Shropshire); 11C (Birmingham, Glasgow); 12A (Lancashire); 12C (London 1, Manchester); 12D (Stoke & Stafford, Edinburgh)
- Branding: Loud & Proud Across The UK

Programming
- Format: LGBTQ+ programming
- Network: Hits Radio

Ownership
- Owner: Bauer Media Audio UK
- Sister stations: Hits Radio UK; Hits Radio Manchester; Greatest Hits Radio UK

History
- First air date: 28 August 2020

Links
- Webcast: Rayo
- Website: Hits Radio Pride

Hits Radio Pride is a national digital radio station owned and operated by Bauer as part of the Hits Radio network. It broadcasts across the United Kingdom. It was launched on 28 August 2020 as a pop up Pride station focusing on music for the LGBT community.

The station was sponsored by The Co-operative Bank for an initial run of 6 months. Additional content is produced by Reform Radio, as part of a grant awarded by the Audio Content Fund. Tough Talks’; is an 'intimate conversations between contributors from the LGBTQ+ community reflecting on the struggles that they face within society.'

Hits Radio Pride also works with LGBT+ helpline Switchboard to promote support services.

== History ==
On 29 July 2020, Bauer announced it was to launch a spinoff pop-up station under the Hits Radio brand.

Hits Radio Pride launched at 8:00AM on 28 August 2020. Its output is similar to its sister station Hits Radio UK, with a particular focus on artists and musicians loved by the LGBTQ+ community.

The concept for the station was first proposed in February 2020 by Ross Tilley, working across Bauer's Northern Ireland radio stations.

== DAB availability ==
Until 2024, the service had only been available on a select number of Bauer owned ensembles including Northern Ireland, Liverpool, Swansea, Bradford and Huddersfield, South Yorkshire, Stoke and London.

The station's DAB reach has now increased following Bauer's rebrand of its heritage station names to Hits Radio; as a result of this, areas where Hits Radio already broadcast have been given over to Hits Radio Pride. Since these rebrandings, the station has been available on many DAB more multiplexes across the UK, including Berkshire, Birmingham, Black Country & Shropshire, Bournemouth, Bradford, Cornwall, East Yorkshire & North Lincolnshire, Edinburgh, Glasgow, Lancashire, Leeds, Liverpool, London, Manchester, North Yorkshire, Sheffield, Stoke, Swansea, Tayside, Teesside and Tyne & Wear.
