= Will Best =

English television presenter (born 1985)

- Born: William Trevorian Stuart Best; 21 February 1985 (age 41); Wandsworth, London, England
- Occupation: Television presenter
- Years active: 2010–present
- Television: Suck My Pop (2010); Love Shaft (2012); Dance Dance Dance (2017); Big Brother (2023–present); Celebrity Big Brother (2024–present)
- Children: 1

William Trevorian Stuart Best (born 21 February 1985) is an English television presenter and entrepreneur. Best has presented numerous shows for Channel 4, ITV and the BBC including T4 on the Beach and Dance Dance Dance. He has also written articles for the HuffPost. In 2023, Best began co-hosting the ITV revival of Big Brother alongside AJ Odudu, and the pair began hosting the spin-off Celebrity Big Brother in 2024. He is a presenter on Hits Radio as of 2025.

== Early life ==
Best was born on 21 February 1985 in Wandsworth, London. He is the son of politician Richard Best, Baron Best and Belinda (née) Stemp. He has two sisters Jessica and Lucy. Prior to his television career, Best worked in advertising.

== Career ==
=== Television ===
Best's first presenting role came in 2010 when he co-presented the comedy music chat show Suck My Pop on Viva with Girls Aloud singer Kimberley Walsh.

From 2011 to 2012, Best was one of the presenters on T4. The same year, he presented the 4Music music show The Crush, taking over from Rick Edwards and presented dating show Love Shaft on E4. He also presented Got to Dance: Auditions Uncut, a spin-off of the dancing competition Got to Dance and The Gleekly.

In 2012 and 2013, Best presented the iTunes Festival for Channel 4 and E4 along with Nick Grimshaw, Annie Mac, Lauren Laverne and Tom Ravenscroft.

In 2015, Best presented the BBC Three documentary Is This Rape? Sex on Trial which tested a group of British teenagers to see if they can work out if a specially written drama about a sexual encounter is consensual sex or if a crime has been committed.

In 2017, Best co-presented the ITV talent show Dance Dance Dance alongside Alesha Dixon.

In 2022, Best appeared on Celebrity Coach Trip alongside friend and comedian Matt Richardson.

In April 2023, it was announced that Best would be hosting the ITV revival of Big Brother, alongside AJ Odudu, and they are set to present the spin-off Celebrity Big Brother from 2024 onwards.

In 2026, Best appeared as a contestant on the twenty-fourth series of Strictly Come Dancing, paired with professional Dianne Buswell.

=== Radio ===
On 5 December 2024, it was announced Best would join Hits Radio, presenting the Sunday morning show from 12 January 2025. On 11 April 2025, it was announced Best would join Fleur East and James Barr as a presenter of The Hits Radio Breakfast Show each weekday from 28 April.

=== Other ventures ===
In 2017, Best and his friend Henry Farnham set up a drinks company, Bloody Drinks, specialising in canned Bloody Mary cocktails, which was stocked in Waitrose, Sainsbury's, and a host of other shops and bars across the UK. During the COVID-19 pandemic, the company landed commercial deals with several major retailers, including Selfridges and Sainsbury's.

== Personal life ==
Best has been engaged to stylist Tobi Rose since 2024, having met in 2010. Their son, Sonny, was born in October 2026.

== Filmography ==
Year	Title	Role	Channel	Ref.
2010	Suck My Pop	Co-presenter	Viva	
2011–2012	The Crush	Presenter	4Music	
2012	Love Shaft	Presenter	E4	
2013–2014	Big Brother's Bit on the Side	Regular panellist	Channel 5	
2015	Is This Rape?: Sex on Trial	Presenter	BBC Three	
2016	Airmageddon	Co-presenter	CBBC	
2017	Dance Dance Dance	Co-presenter	ITV	
2022	Celebrity Coach Trip	Contestant	E4	
2023–present	Big Brother	Co-presenter	ITV2	
2023–present	Big Brother: Late & Live	Co-presenter	ITV2	
2024–present	Celebrity Big Brother	Co-presenter	ITV1	
2024–present	Celebrity Big Brother: Late & Live	Co-presenter	ITV2	
2026	Strictly Come Dancing	Contestant	BBC One	
