= Suck My Pop =

- Presented by: Kimberley Walsh; Will Best
- Country of origin: United Kingdom
- No. of series: 1
- No. of episodes: 12 (to 23 September 2010)

Production
- Running time: 60 minutes

Original release
- Network: Viva
- Release: 23 July – 22 October 2010

Suck My Pop is a British comedy music chat show presented by Kimberley Walsh (part of pop group Girls Aloud) and Will Best. It was a weekly show broadcast on Fridays at 7pm, between August and September 2010, covering music and celebrity news. It also included interviews and/or challenges with groups or singers.

The reception was mixed and the first two episodes didn't reach the top ten programs for Viva. The program was not renewed for a second series.
