= Star Radio (Cambridge and Ely) =

Radio station in Cambridge, England

Coordinates: 52.215243°N 0.149233°E

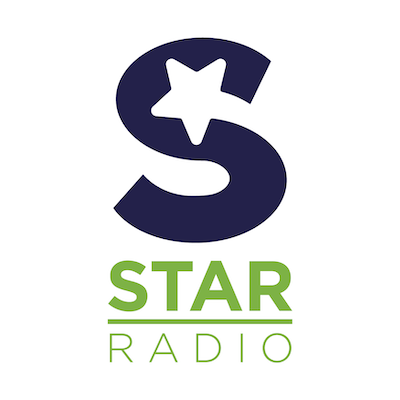
- Cambridge; England
- Broadcast area: Cambridgeshire, north-west Essex and south-west Suffolk
- Frequencies: FM: 100.7 MHz (Cambridge); 107.1 MHz (Ely); 107.3 MHz (Saffron Walden); 107.9 MHz (Haverhill); DAB: 11C (Cambridge), 12D (Peterborough)
- RDS: Star

Programming
- Format: CHR

Ownership
- Owner: Bauer Media Audio UK

History
- First air date: 23 March 1998
- Last air date: 3 March 2025

Links
- Website: www.star.radio

Star Radio was an Independent Local Radio station broadcasting on 100.7 MHz in Cambridge, 107.1 MHz in Ely, 107.3 MHz in Saffron Walden, and 107.9 MHz in Haverhill.

== History ==
The station was originally launched as "Cambridge Café Radio" in March 1998, having been established by broadcaster Tony Currie and other volunteers. Although the original aim was to become Cambridgeshire's first community radio station, the eventual license was a commercial one. On 23 November 1998, after acquisition by Dawe Media, it was relaunched as "Cambridge Red". Dawe Media was acquired by UKRD in 1999, and in July 2000 Cambridge Red was relaunched as 107.9 The Eagle.

In 2001, UKRD rebranded the station again to Star 107.9, in line with the rebranding of their other stations.

In 2003, Star 107.1/5 in Ely and The Fens split frequencies. 107.5 in Wisbech became Fen Radio 107.5, and 107.1 in Ely became a relay of Star 107.9. Because of this, the station adjusted their name to 107 Star FM. The name was adjusted again in 2004 to Star 107. Star 107 was rebranded in August 2005 as 'Star Radio' coinciding with the rebrand of the other 'Star' network stations in the UKRD Group.

In July 2013, the station renamed itself to Prince George Radio for one week to commemorate the birth of Prince George of Wales, with money donated to the local maternity hospital every time a presenter mentioned its previous name.

On 1 January 2017, the station was sold to Mid Anglia Media Ltd and in 2019 the licence was transferred to Light Blue Media Cambridge.

In July 2020, the station moved its main frequency to 100.7 MHz from 107.9 MHz and at the same time substantially increased its transmission power whilst relocating its transmitter to the Arqiva Madingley site. In November 2020, a new transmitter for Haverhill was switched on using the former 107.9 MHz frequency.

As of January 2021, the station was available across Cambridgeshire and Peterborough on DAB digital radio.

On 10 January 2025, it was announced that Bauer Media Audio UK had acquired the station, would cease local output, and rebrand it as a relay of Hits Radio. Star Radio officially ended on the evening of 3 March 2025 at midnight. The last three songs played before the station's closure were "Star People" by George Michael, "Waiting for a Star to Fall" by Boy Meets Girl, and "Stars" by Simply Red. However, a listener who recorded the final moments of the station reported that after these three tracks, "Beautiful Things" by Benson Boone was played shortly after midnight, just before the signal cut to static.

The station rebranded to Hits Radio Cambridgeshire on the evening of 3 March 2025 at midnight, with Hattie Pearson welcoming in the new listeners.

== Awards ==
In 2009 the station won both Station of the Year (under 300,000 listeners), and Presentation Newcomer for its mid-morning host Ryan Taylor at the Arqiva Commercial Radio Awards.

== Listening figures ==
As of September 2024, the station had a weekly audience of 35,000 listeners according to RAJAR.

== Former presenters ==
- Craig Stevens

== See also ==
- Fen Radio 107.5
- KL.FM 96.7
