= Tim Grundy =

English television and radio presenter (1958-2009)

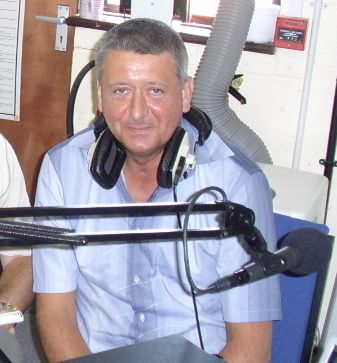
- Grundy, 2006
- Born: 4 July 1958; Manchester, Lancashire, England
- Died: 1 February 2009 (aged 50)
- Occupations: Television presenter; radio personality
- Website: timgrundy.co.uk (archived copy)

Timothy Grundy (4 July 1958 – 1 February 2009) was an English television and radio presenter. He was born in Manchester, Lancashire.

== Biography ==
Grundy was born to a Scottish mother and Bill Grundy, the broadcaster remembered for his expletive-filled interview with the Sex Pistols.

In 1975, at the age of 17, Tim began work as a tea boy at Piccadilly Radio in Manchester and over the next 14 years he rose to become the station's breakfast show presenter, and later, its programme controller. In September 1988, he was the first presenter on air upon the launch of Key 103 (now Hits Radio).

He was a journalist, whose folksy relaxed style made him a popular television presenter, where he worked predominantly for the Discovery Channel and other satellite broadcasting companies. His appearances were numerous, including from 1990: Showbiz People, People Today, See You Sunday, The Forum and Pebble Mill.

From 1995 onwards, he appeared in several of the by now highly successful Two's Country series, including Two's Country Cooking, Two's Country Spain, Two's Country Caribbean, Two's Country Eastern Europe, Two's Country Get Stuck In and Two's Country Ship to Shore, as well as Travelling Light (for Channel 4).

In 1999 he appeared in Great Estates, Two's Country which was renewed into five television series: Ship to Shore, Show People, Car Country, and What's in a Word? among others. On 11 August, Tim presented the Discovery Home and Leisure channel's live coverage of the total solar eclipse.

In 2000 he appeared in The Villagers, Cabin Fever, Last in the League and A Room with a Clue.

In October 2002, he was launch programme controller for Reading 107, where he also hosted the breakfast show.

Whilst working at Reading 107, he lived in the hamlet of Ufton Nervet and on 6 November 2004 he was one of the first on the scene of the Ufton Nervet rail crash, in which seven people died.

Grundy had two children and was chairman of the Children's Adventure Farm Trust. He also worked for other charities, including the Boys and Girls Welfare Society, until his death on 1 February 2009.

== Death ==
Grundy suffered heart failure in 2006, and was in a coma for several weeks. He was fitted with a defibrillator, and his health remained poor. In 2009, he was admitted to hospital with a minor injury, but deteriorated very quickly in hospital and died of blood loss and multiple organ failure.
