= Love Shaft =

British dating game show

- Presented by: Will Best
- Narrated by: Maria McErlane
- Country of origin: United Kingdom

Original release
- Network: E4

Love Shaft is a British speed-dating game show broadcast on E4. It is presented by Will Best and narrated by Maria McErlane.
