= Fen Radio 107.5 =

Wisbech; England
- Broadcast area: East Cambridgeshire
- Frequency: 107.5 MHz

Programming
- Format: AC

Ownership
- Owner: UKRD Group

History
- First air date: 3 October 1999
- Last air date: 31 July 2008

Fen Radio 107.5 was an Independent Local Radio station broadcasting from Church Mews, Wisbech in Cambridgeshire. While broadcasting as 'Star Fens' the station also covered the Ely and Littleport areas as well, until the 107.1 frequency was taken over by Star 107.9 (Cambridge) – their sister station.

The transmission mast was on an old water tower at Friday Bridge near the B1101, 4 miles (6.4 km) south of Wisbech.

The station announced that it would cease broadcasting at the end of July 2008, with owners UKRD handing back the licence to regulators Ofcom. Fen Radio was the third station to do this, following their sister station Star Radio in Stroud and River FM in Livingston. Fen Radio closed down at 6pm on Thursday 31 July 2008, playing Survivor's "Eye of the Tiger" as their last song, which was also the first when the station launched on 3 October 1999.
