= All Our Yesterdays (TV series) =

British television documentary series

Brian Inglis in a publicity shot for All Our Yesterdays

All Our Yesterdays is a British television series, produced by Granada Television, giving a historical account of the 1930s lead-up to the Second World War and of the war itself. It relied on film footage, and may be considered a precursor to the later Thames Television World at War production. The title of the series alludes to Macbeth's soliloquy in Act 5 Scene 5 after Lady Macbeth's death ("And all our yesterdays have lighted fools / The way to dusty death").

The series ran weekly from 1960 to 1973 and from 1987 to 1989. The format was a studio commentary, supported by newsreel clips that had been shown in cinemas 25 years ago that week. The final series concentrated on 1939. The years to 1964 focused on the build-up to the war, mixed with more light-hearted fare. The series continued, mostly with war footage, from 1964 to 1970. A measure of comic relief was provided by wartime cartoons, especially by Osbert Lancaster for the Daily Express, with captions read by actors.

The presenters were:

- James Cameron (1960 to 1961)
- Brian Inglis (1962 to 1973)
- Bernard Braden (1987 to 1989)

One wartime newsreel which found a new audience was "Hoch der Lambeth Valk". This propaganda film of a Nazi rally, with goose-stepping parades, had been re-edited, reversing some sequences, so the marchers appeared to be dancing "The Lambeth Walk". The effect became a favourite.

Only 47 episodes of the original series (1960–1973) survive, whereas the later series (1987–1989) survives complete.
