= Hits Radio Dorset =

Radio station in Bournemouth

- Logo used since 2024.
- Bournemouth; United Kingdom
- Broadcast area: Bournemouth, Poole and Christchurch
- Frequencies: FM: 107.6 MHz; DAB: 11B
- Branding: Dorset's Hits Radio; The Biggest Hits, The Biggest Throwbacks

Programming
- Format: CHR/Pop
- Network: Hits Radio

Ownership
- Owner: Bauer Media Audio UK
- Sister stations: Greatest Hits Radio South Coast; Hits Radio South Coast

History
- First air date: 26 June 1999 (as FM 107.6 The NRG)
- Former names: FM 107.6 The NRG; 107.6 The Fire; Fire 107.6; Fire Radio; Hits Radio Bournemouth & Poole

Links
- Website: Hits Radio Dorset

Hits Radio Dorset, formerly Fire Radio, is an Independent Local Radio station owned and operated by Bauer as part of the Hits Radio Network. It broadcasts to Bournemouth, Poole, and Christchurch, Dorset from studios outside its broadcast area, in Segensworth in Fareham.

The station was originally launched on 26 June 1999 by founding Directors James Bromley and David Harber as FM 107.6 The NRG, but changed name a year later following a dispute with French radio station NRJ. The station is now owned and operated by Bauer Radio

As of September 2024, the station broadcasts to a weekly audience of 29,000, according to RAJAR.

== History ==
The NRG FM 107.6 logo, 1999–2000

The NRG (Nerve Radio Group) was born out of the Bournemouth student station Nerve* Radio. The launch team included David and Emily at Breakfast, Max Hailey, Lloydie James Lloyd and Dan Lodge on the schedule. A range of specialist DJs were included in the schedule, such as Jay Ratchett, Ross EB, Jon Langford, Michael Artwell and Jez Welham. Specialist programmes also included Club Versive hosted by Boy George, and the Ministry of Sound Dance Party.

=== Name change ===
French broadcaster NRJ challenged "The NRG" over the use of the name as the pronunciation was the same. In discussion with the station's solicitors (Stephens Innocent) the station management agreed that although there was a "chance" that the Bournemouth station could win the challenge – and even if not, they could go to Appeal and "almost certainly" win – the costs involved in challenging one of Europe's biggest radio brands would be too high for a small station on the South Coast of the UK. Despite the notion of 'borrowing station names', Managing Director David Harber renamed the station "The Fire" after a Chicago-based station "WFYR" which had been 'off-air' for a number of years. The station changed name on Bonfire Night, 2000.

=== Studios ===
The station moved from the original studios in the Quadrant Shopping Centre, to purpose-built studios at the Picture House on Holdenhurst Road in Bournemouth in June 2007. The station now broadcasts from the Celador studios in Southampton.

=== Ownership ===
The station was sold by its original founders in October 2001 to Radio Investments Limited, which later became known as The Local Radio Company.

The Local Radio Company then sold Fire 107.6 to Westward Broadcasting in June 2009.

Celador Radio purchased Fire in July 2014. In February 2019, Fire was then sold to Bauer Radio.

=== Hits Radio Bournemouth and Poole ===
On 6 September 2021, Fire Radio was renamed Hits Radio Bournemouth and Poole with Fleur East at Breakfast and Jono Holmes on drivetime. Max and Jason moved to drivetime on Hits Radio Bristol & The South West launching on the same day.

== Programming ==
Hits Radio network programming is broadcast and produced from Bauer's London headquarters or studios in Manchester & occasionally Newcastle.

== News ==
Hits Radio Dorset broadcasts local news bulletins hourly from 6am-7pm on weekdays, and from 7am-1pm on Saturdays and Sundays. Headlines are broadcast on the half-hour during weekday breakfast and drivetime shows, alongside traffic bulletins.

National bulletins from Sky News Radio are carried overnight with bespoke networked bulletins on weekend afternoons, usually originating from the Hits Radio Leeds newsroom.

== Transmitters ==
=== Analogue (FM) ===
Transmitter Site	Frequency	Power	RDS Name	PI Code	Area
West Howe	107.6 MHz	1000W	__HITS__	C49F	Bournemouth, Poole & Christchurch

=== Digital (DAB) ===
Multiplex	Block	Area
Now Digital Bournemouth	11B	Bournemouth, Poole, Christchurch, West Dorset, North Dorset, South Dorset

== Slogans ==
- 'Today's Music'
- 'Bournemouth, Poole and Christchurch'
- 'Playing the very best Non-Stop 90s and now'
- 'Set your Radio on FIRE'
- 'You're on FIRE'
- 'Love the new FIRE 107.6'
- 'Only FIRE news is all local, all day'
- 'The hit music station for Bournemouth, Poole and Christchurch'
- 'The Most Hit Music'
- 'This is FIRE Radio'
- 'Bigger variety of hits'
- 'The Biggest Hits, The Biggest Throwbacks'
- 'Hits Radio is Coming to Bournemouth and Poole, New Name For Fire, Playing The Biggest Hits and The Biggest Throwbacks'
