= Hits Radio Cornwall =

Local radio station in Cornwall, England

- Redruth; England
- Broadcast area: Cornwall and West Devon
- Frequency: DAB: 11B
- Branding: Cornwall's Hits Radio; The Biggest Hits, The Biggest Throwbacks

Programming
- Format: CHR/Pop
- Network: Hits Radio

Ownership
- Owner: Bauer Media Audio UK
- Sister stations: Greatest Hits Radio Cornwall

History
- First air date: 3 April 1992; 33 years ago
- Former names: Pirate FM 102; Pirate FM
- Former frequencies: FM: 102.2 MHz (Caradon Hill); FM: 102.8 MHz (Redruth)

Links
- Website: Hits Radio Cornwall

Hits Radio Cornwall, formerly Pirate FM, is an Independent Local Radio station owned and operated by Bauer Media Audio UK as part of the Hits Radio network. It broadcasts to Cornwall and West Devon on DAB.

As of September 2024, the station broadcasts to a weekly audience of 88,000 according to RAJAR.

== Background ==
The station was launched in 1992 under the name of Pirate FM 102 with the voice of breakfast presenter Roger Day (a well-known ex-pirate DJ from Radio Caroline and Radio North Sea International). The station's launch Chief Executive was Mike Powell, who specified digital technology so advanced at the time that it was featured on the BBC science programme, Tomorrow's World.

Much of the early success of the station was due to the technical expertise of the first managing director Richard Lawley, who was also a graduate electronic engineer. He was succeeded by the station's initial sales director Joseph Swain. The station has also won numerous awards including 'Station of the Year' (in the 300,000 to 1 million potential audience category) at the 2003 and 2006 Sony Radio Academy awards.

In September 2005, the station's branding changed from The Southwest's Pirate FM to Cornwall's Pirate FM. Listenership appears to have increased in Cornwall following the move, however it reduced their audience in West Devon (including Plymouth, where Pirate FM had a separate office and studio prior to the rebrand). From "Quarter 4" 2006 Pirate FM's survey area (TSA) was reduced by removing Plymouth & most of West Devon, thus reducing the potential audience significantly but focusing on the core Cornish audience. Pirate FM remains as the number one station by audience reach despite the increased competition.

The Pirate Trust was the charitable arm of Pirate FM that raises thousands of pounds yearly for good causes in Cornwall with their 'Cornwall in Need Appeal'. Yearly fundraisers include the 'Garden Party' and the all-day on-air and online auction known as 'Radiothon'. Radiothon [2007] and Radiothon [2008] were both run in collaboration with free classifieds website itsmymarket.com

Almost all programming is produced and presented locally. From August 2014 until 2020, the station operated a second service on DAB, known as Pirate 2, which aired a series of weekly specialist talk shows, covering topics such as business, farming, education and health and wellbeing.

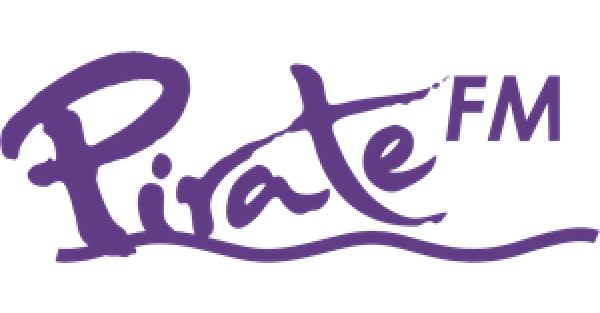
Pirate FM logo used from 2020 to 2024.

Until 2018, Pirate FM broadcast The Vodafone Big Top 40 chart show (previously The Pepsi Chart & Hit40UK) which was produced from Capital FM in London and syndicated across over 140 commercial radio stations in the UK. However, the show was withdrawn from syndication in 2018 and now broadcasts solely on Heart & Capital stations. The 'Hits UK' show is now presented on the station with Sam Thompson.

In February 2021, the station, along with Lincs FM, began syndicating the UK Chart Show, from Bauer's Hits Radio network, on Sunday afternoons. In recent years, the station has also shared a music playlist and many features with Hampshire-based sister station Wave 105.

== Station restructuring and rebrand ==
On 27 February 2024, station owners Bauer announced Pirate FM would be rebranded as Hits Radio Cornwall from 17 April 2024, as part of a wider relaunch involving 17 local radio stations in England and Wales.

The station would be available on DAB and online only and most of the station's local programming outside weekday breakfast will be replaced with programming from the Hits Radio Network, although local news, traffic bulletins and advertising will be retained.

Pirate's FM frequencies were taken over by a local variant of Greatest Hits Radio, which will include a local afternoon show for Cornwall, local news and traffic bulletins, alongside a largely networked schedule featuring weekday shows with Ken Bruce and Simon Mayo.

The changes were expected to lead to a number of redundancies with freelance contracts being placed under review.

It was later announced that Pirate presenters Scott Temple and Holly Day would host Greatest Hits Radio's local afternoon show. The pair left Bauer when the afternoon show was replaced by networked programming in October 2024.

On 20 March 2025, Bauer announced it would end its local Hits Radio breakfast show for Cornwall to be replaced by a new national breakfast show for England and Wales on 9 June 2025. Local news and traffic bulletins were retained but the station's Redruth studios were closed.

Hits Radio's final local programme for Cornwall aired on 6 June 2025.

Some former Pirate FM presenters, including Scott Temple and Saffy who had remained into the Hits/GHR era, were recruited by Nation Broadcasting to provide regional programming to the south-west when a dedicated Nation Radio Westcountry feed launched to digital radio in Cornwall, Devon and Somerset in March 2026.

== Programming ==
All programming airs via Bauer’s London headquarters or from studios in Birmingham, Liverpool, Manchester and Newcastle.

== Former presenters ==
- Scott Temple
- Holly Day
- Johnny Cowling
- Neil Caddy
- Saffy
- Matt Bunt
- Mark Chapple
- Allen Fleckney
- Bob McCreadie
- Tina Bessell
- Ian Polmear
- Dave Gould
- James Martin
- James Dundon
- Phil Angell
- Duncan Warren
- Robbie Dee
- Pam Spriggs
- Jane Friggens
- Roger Day
- Elliot Turner
- Jon Carter
- Steve Ryan
- Tony James
- Alan Gates

== News ==
Bauer's newsroom broadcasts local news bulletins hourly from 6am-7pm on weekdays, and from 7am-1pm on Saturdays and Sundays. Headlines are broadcast on the half-hour during weekday breakfast and drivetime shows, alongside traffic bulletins.

National bulletins from Sky News Radio are carried overnight with bespoke networked bulletins on weekend afternoons, usually originating from Bauer's Manchester newsroom.

== Branding ==
Hits Radio Cornwall has one current on air strapline: "The Biggest Hits, The Biggest Throwbacks"

005, made by jingle production company IQ Beats. It was a re-recording of a previous package made for Heart 106.2 in London.

Previous Pirate FM (Former name of Hits Radio Cornwall) straplines were "More music for Cornwall", "Real music variety", "Better variety, more music", "The world's greatest music", "Greatest memories, latest hits", "Love Cornwall, Love Music, Love Pirate FM" and "The latest technology, and the best records too".

Pirate FM adopted the Hits Radio Network slogan 'The Biggest Hits, The Biggest Throwbacks' in 2023, alongside 'Love Cornwall, Love Music'.

== Mascot ==
Intermittently since 1992, the station employed a mascot that accompanies the broadcast team to events.

From launch until the early 2000s, the character was known as "Jasper Parrot", while in recent years, Pirate revisited the concept with a parrot character, named "Dreckly" after an audience vote.

== Expansion ==
Pirate FM was one of the two stations that applied for the licence to serve Plymouth after the licence was handed back by Macquarie's Diamond FM.

The UKRD plan to extend Pirate's service under the name Plymouth's Pirate FM lost out to Radio Plymouth, which was also eventually acquired by Bauer Media Audio UK and merged with the Greatest Hits Radio network in its FM slots and the Hits Radio network on its former DAB slot.
