= Hits Radio =

UK contemporary radio network

- London (headquarters) Manchester Newcastle; United Kingdom
- Broadcast area: United Kingdom (digital)
- Frequencies: FM: 96.4 MHz – 107.9 MHz; DAB: 7D – 12D
- Branding: TSA's Hits Radio; The Biggest Hits, The Biggest Throwbacks

Programming
- Language: English
- Format: CHR/Hot AC

Ownership
- Owner: Bauer Media Audio UK
- Sister stations: Hits Radio Pride; Hits Radio 90s Hits Radio 00s

History
- First air date: 31 December 1973 (local stations); December 1999 (as Big City Network); April 2011 (as Bauer Place); January 2015 (as Bauer City 1); 4 June 2018 (as Hits Radio Network)
- Former names: Big City Network (2000–2011); Bauer Place (2011–2015); Bauer City 1 (2015–2018)

Links
- Webcast: Rayo
- Website: Hits Radio

Hits Radio is a network of 26 contemporary hit radio stations in the United Kingdom, owned and operated by Bauer Media Audio UK. The network launched in 2018 with the rebranding of Bauer's Manchester station Key 103 and its merger with The Hits, and since then various other local stations have been rebranded under the Hits Radio banner.

As of February 2025, the network has a combined reach of 6.77 million weekly listeners according to RAJAR.

The Hits Radio commercial portfolio, including stations such as Cool FM, has a combined reach of 12.4 million listeners.

== Overview ==
Hits Radio UK broadcasts on DAB in many parts of the UK and online. 25 localised variants air on FM and DAB across England and Wales.

As of May 2024, there are a total of 25 local radio stations in the network providing local programming, news, traffic and sport, along with networked output from Hits Radio UK.

The FM network of stations was formerly known as the Big City Network, Bauer Place and Bauer City 1. The national DAB station was formerly known as The Hits.

Until 17 April 2024, most of the stations broadcast under their local identities, such as Clyde 1 in Glasgow and Radio City in Liverpool. After this date, only the Scottish stations retained their heritage branding, with English and Welsh stations becoming localised outputs of Hits Radio.

== History ==
=== Before the network ===
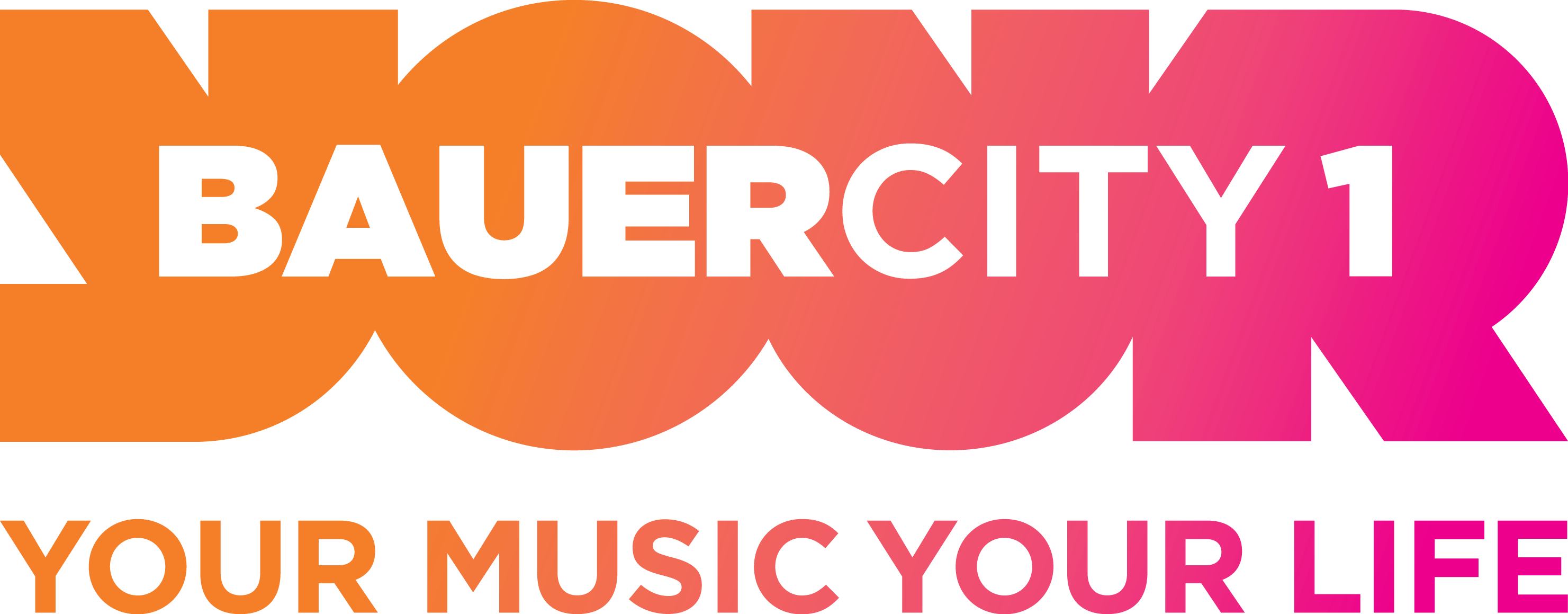
Former logo for the Bauer City 1 Network

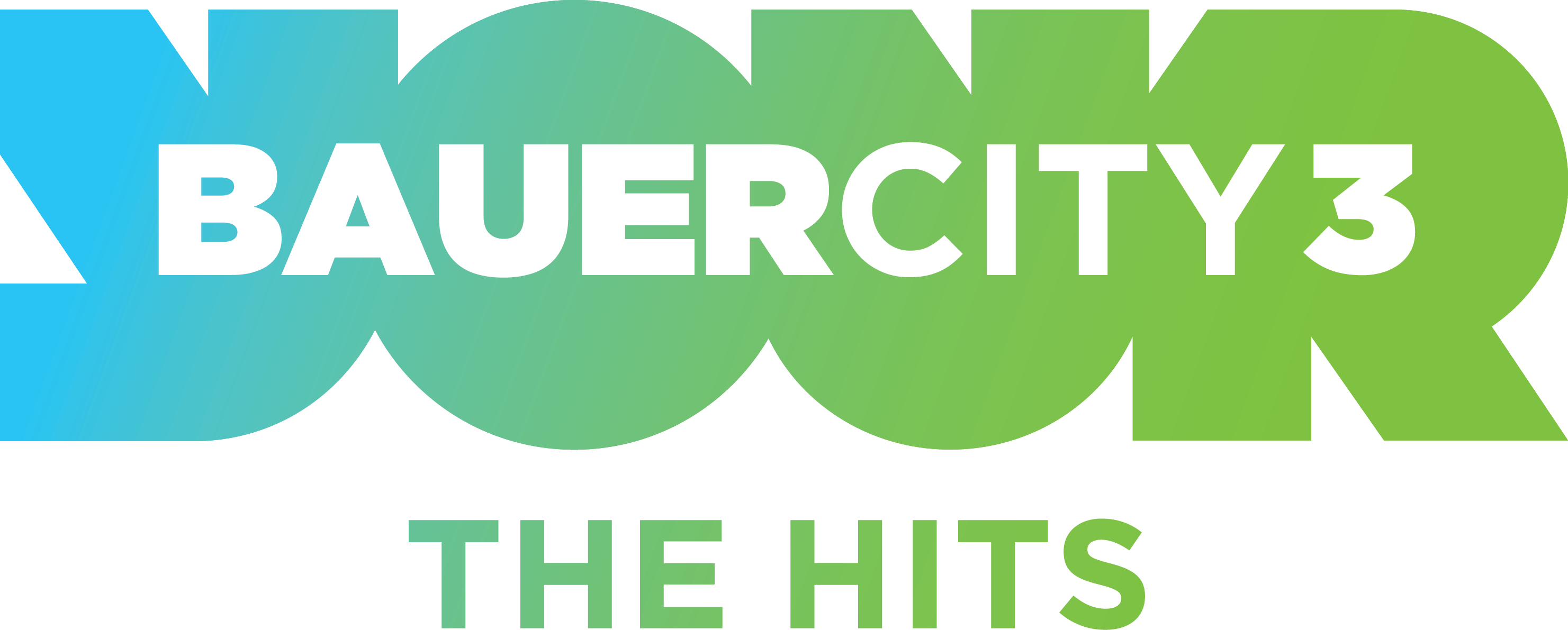
Former logo for the Bauer City 3 Network

Initially known as the Big City Network, and latterly Bauer Place and Bauer City 1, networked programming on Bauer's local FM stations in Northern England and Scotland was initially confined to off-peak night time and weekend timeslots.

In February 2014, the stations adopted a standardised audio identity package, produced by Wisebuddah, while retaining their local station branding. Two networked shows were also introduced across most stations - Old Skool and Anthems and In: Demand - produced from Key 103 in Manchester. Separate schedules for Northern England and Scotland were introduced in August 2015, followed in July 2017 by two networked mid-morning shows for most of the FM stations, produced from Manchester and Glasgow respectively. In February 2017, the Free Radio group of stations in the West Midlands began carrying off-peak programming from the Northern England network, replacing most of its own regional output from Birmingham.

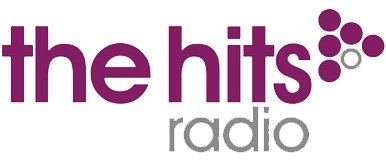
Old logo of The Hits radio

On 19 January 2015, The Hits formed the tagline of the locally branded Bauer City 3 network of radio stations in Northern England and Scotland. The local City 3 branding was dropped on 31 August 2017, in favour of the tagline becoming the name of a national station on all local DAB Multiplexes.

=== Launch ===
Bauer, on the 4 June 2018, rebranded and relaunched Key 103 in Manchester to Hits Radio Manchester a CHR-led music station aimed at 25-44 year olds. Hits Radio Manchester continued to provide local news & information, traffic bulletins and advertising on its local platforms - 103 FM, DAB and online.

The station was merged with national DAB station The Hits, which in turn was rebranded itself as Hits Radio UK to provide a single national service across the UK on DAB, Freeview and online. The station's programming networked across 24 local FM stations - all of which opt out at times for local output. Local weekend programming for most of the English stations was replaced with additional network output in July 2019, followed in September 2019 by the introduction of a networked Drivetime show.

=== Expansion ===
Gem in the East Midlands joined the network in July 2019 to carry late night and overnight programming from Manchester.

The Scottish network of stations introduced a networked Drivetime show at the end of March 2020, except for MFR and Radio Borders.

Five stations were acquired to join the network, of which four retained heritage branding: Pulse 1 (Bradford), Signal 1 (Stoke-on-Trent), The Wave (Swansea) and Fire Radio (Bournemouth). Pulse, Signal, and The Wave began carrying off-peak programming from the Hits Radio network on 15 June 2020. The fifth, The Breeze (Portsmouth, Southampton and Winchester) rebranded as Hits Radio under a licensing agreement with Nation Broadcasting. On 20 July 2020, Pulse 1, Signal 1 and The Wave officially joined the Hits Radio network.

On 31 August 2020, Radio Aire ceased broadcasting and moved to the sister Greatest Hits Radio network - it merged with twelve other stations to form Greatest Hits Radio Yorkshire.

The same day saw Hits Radio South Coast launch, thereby becoming the second FM station to be known on air as Hits Radio. The station had previously broadcast as The Breeze South Coast and the change is made following the purchase in 2019 of The Breeze network from Celador Radio. Nation Broadcasting replaced Hits Radio South Coast with their own Easy Radio South Coast programming from 19 September 2022, with Bauer providing Hits Radio content thereafter on the South Hampshire DAB multiplex.

In October 2020, it was announced that Hits Radio would launch in Suffolk, taking over the DAB capacity which had been used for Greatest Hits Radio since September (previously Town 102), in tandem with the relaunch of Ipswich 102 as Greatest Hits Radio. The change took place on 3 November, at the point Ipswich 102 (and Radio Plymouth) took the GHR affiliation. As in North Yorkshire, a localised feed of Hits Radio is provided, with the ability to split from the network programming content for localised branding, news material and advertising. Hits Radio Suffolk was withdrawn after 1 October 2022, with the capacity reverting to GHR, as a consequence of the FM frequency (the prior Ipswich 102) transitioning to Nation Radio Suffolk.

In November 2021, Bauer announced the two Free Radio breakfast shows - known as Hits at Breakfast - would be merged into one regional show across all four Free Radio licences. The merger was permitted under Ofcom's local content guidelines, although all four Free Radio licences retain opt-outs for local news, traffic updates and advertising.

In November 2022, it was announced that CFM in Cumbria would follow Radio Aire in transitioning from the Hits Radio network to Greatest Hits Radio, with the change slated to take place as of April 2023; CFM's local weekday show would remain, moved from breakfast to broadcast in an afternoon slot on GHR, with Hits Radio content continuing to be available in the area over DAB - replacing the localised digital-only version of GHR broadcast to Cumbria since the local DAB multiplex began broadcasting in late 2021. Around the same time as announcing the CFM change, Bauer confirmed that two of the relay transmitters of Signal 1 would transfer to carrying GHR from January 2023, with the station's main transmitter area - where GHR broadcasts on AM (formerly Signal 2) - retaining the Hits Network positioning.

In January 2023, Bauer announced that Radio Borders would follow CFM in transitioning from the Hits Radio network to Greatest Hits Radio, in April 2023.

In November 2023, Bauer announced that from January 2024, the two individual breakfast shows on both Radio City and Rock FM would come to an end and would be merged to form a simulcast show on both stations. The new show is presented by Joel Ross and Leanne Campbell and broadcast from Bauer's Liverpool studios at the Hits Radio Tower. The stations continue their separate branding and news bulletins.

=== Rationalisation ===
In January 2024, it was announced that fifteen of Bauer's local radio stations in England and Wales - which form part of the Hits Radio network - would be rebranded as Hits Radio from 17 April 2024. No changes are expected to the network's local, regional and national programming, including local news and traffic bulletins, as a result of the rebrand.

Kiss was replaced by Hits Radio at 10.00pm on 22 September 2024 across the West of England on 97.2 MHz, 101.0 MHz & 106.5 MHz, in London on 100.0 MHz and in Norfolk on 106.1 MHz. The first song that played on the former Kiss frequencies was Pink with Trustfall and Hattie Pearson was the presenter who launched the stations. The regional mid-morning show in the West of England ended on 25 October 2024, with the South of England show also ending on the 1 November 2024.

West FM (after 27 years) rebranded to 'Clyde 1 Ayrshire' from 16 September 2024; sharing all output with Clyde 1 whilst retaining local news, weather and travel bulletins. On 6 January 2025, Forth 1's breakfast show expanded, replacing MFR, Northsound 1 and Tay FM's separate local breakfast shows, Star Radio was acquired by Bauer on the 10 January, local output ended with the station becoming a relay of Hits Radio.

Local and regional Hits Radio breakfast shows for England and Wales are planned to be replaced by a national breakfast show on 9 June 2025. Local advertising, news and traffic bulletins will continue across all stations. Four main broadcasting hubs will be retained in London, Manchester, Glasgow and Belfast. These will be supported by smaller production centres in Edinburgh, Newcastle and Leeds. As a result, the following will cease: Aberdeen, Birmingham, Fareham, Inverness, Lincoln, Redruth, Sheffield and Swansea.

On 11 April 2025 it was announced Will Best would join Fleur East and James Barr as a presenter of The Hits Radio Breakfast Show each weekday from 28 April.

The remaining local and regional Hits Radio breakfast shows for England and Wales ended on 6 June 2025.

In early September 2025, new localised (for news and advertising, with programming from the Hits Radio network feed) variants of Hits Radio for fourteen areas of England and north Wales which had previously received Hits Radio UK on DAB began to operate online and on digital radio. In Suffolk this effectively led to the reintroduction of a dedicated Hits Radio Suffolk, which had previously been provided between 2020 and 2022. Hits Radio UK would become unavailable in England and Wales as a result, but continues to broadcast on four multiplexes in Scotland alongside the locally branded Hits network stations for these areas.

== Stations ==
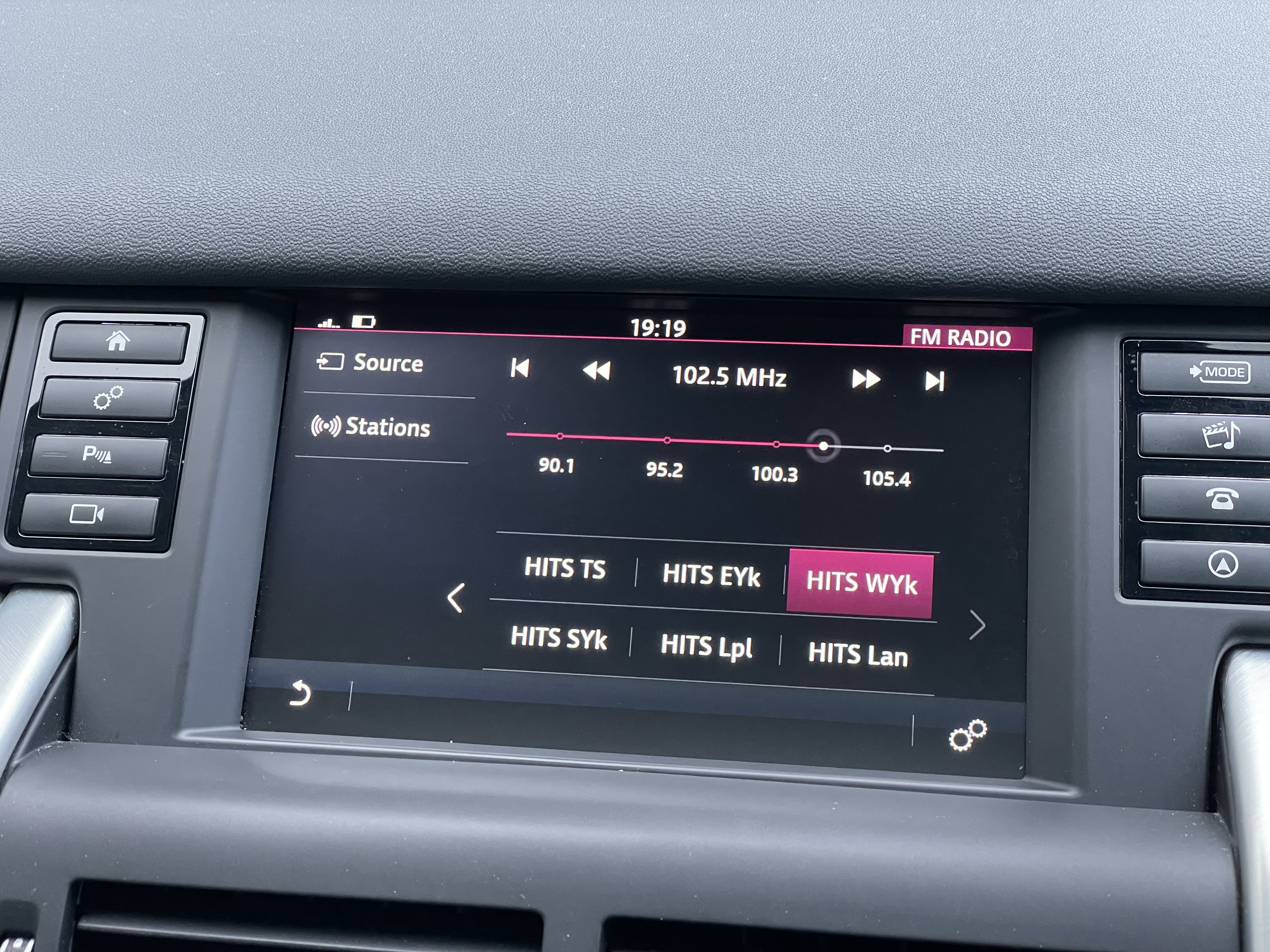
Hits Radio UK car Radio Data System display.

Hits Radio branded: UK	Studios	Formerly
UK	London, Manchester and Newcastle	The Hits

Hits Radio branded: England, Wales & Northern Ireland	Studios	Formerly
Birmingham	—N/a	Free Radio
Black Country & Shropshire	—N/a	Free Radio
Cambridgeshire	—N/a	Star Radio
Cornwall - DAB only	—N/a	Pirate FM
Coventry & Warwickshire	—N/a	Free Radio
Cumbria - DAB only	—N/a	CFM
Dorset	—N/a	Fire Radio
East Midlands - DAB only	—N/a	Gem
East Yorkshire & North Lincolnshire	—N/a	Viking FM
Herefordshire & Worcestershire	—N/a	Free Radio
Lancashire	—N/a	Rock FM
Lincolnshire - DAB only	—N/a	Lincs FM
Liverpool	—N/a	Radio City
London	London	Kiss 100
Manchester	Manchester	Key 103
North East	Newcastle	Metro Radio
Norfolk	—N/a	Kiss 105-108
Northern Ireland - DAB only	—N/a	—N/a
Oxfordshire	—N/a	Jack 3 & Chill
South Wales	—N/a	The Wave
South Yorkshire	—N/a	Hallam FM
Staffordshire & Cheshire	—N/a	Signal 1
Teesside	—N/a	TFM
West of England	—N/a	Kiss 101
West Yorkshire	Leeds	Pulse 1

Heritage branded: Scotland	Studios	Formerly
Clyde 1	Glasgow	—N/a
Clyde 1 Ayrshire	Glasgow	West FM
Forth 1	Edinburgh	—N/a
Northsound 1	Edinburgh	—N/a
MFR	Edinburgh	—N/a
Tay FM	Edinburgh	—N/a

== Spin-off stations ==
=== Hits Radio Pride ===
On 29 July 2020, Bauer announced a spinoff pop-up station to Hits Radio, Hits Radio Pride, which launched at 8am on 28 August 2020. The new station would be the first time a major radio broadcaster in the United Kingdom has launched a station that was targeted to the LGBTQ+ community. The service is taking capacity on a select number of Bauer owned ensembles including Northern Ireland, Liverpool, Swansea, Bradford, Stoke and London. Bauer acquired additional DAB capacity as part of the deal to buy Wireless Group's local radio portfolio in 2019.

In Liverpool, Hits Radio Pride took capacity previously used by Radio City Talk. In Northern Ireland the service replaced Magic Chilled.

The station was sponsored by The Co-operative Bank for an initial run of 6 months. Additional content is produced by Reform Radio, as part of a grant awarded by the Audio Content Fund. Tough Talks’; is an 'intimate conversations between contributors from the LGBTQ+ community reflecting on the struggles that they face within society.'

Hits Radio Pride also works with LGBT+ helpline Switchboard (UK) to promote support services.

The station started online and smart speaker test transmissions on 21 August 2020. It consisted of a looped promo featuring tracks from MNEK, Kylie Minogue, Calvin Harris, Kim Petras, Years & Years and Lady Gaga, along with promo trailers. The multiplex variation request submitted to Ofcom suggested the station would arrive on DAB multiplexes from 26 August 2020.

=== Hits Radio Chilled ===
On Monday 16 September 2024, at 7:00PM (UK) Hits Radio Chilled launched playing “laid back hits and throwbacks”. The first programme was hosted by the Irish singer-songwriter Cian Ducrot with his song ‘All for You‘ being the first song to be played on the station. News jingles had been playing for some weeks before. The station is a rebrand of Magic Chilled.

=== Hits Radio 90s & 00s ===
On 31 March 2025, Bauer launched two decades spin-off stations Hits Radio 90s and Hits Radio 00s.

On 9 June 2025, Steve & Karen's Breakfast Show, previously the North East regional Hits Radio breakfast show, moved to Hits Radio 90s, A breakfast show launched on Hits Radio 00s on the same date, hosted by Joel Ross.

=== Premium-only spin-off stations ===
Bauer offers additional spin-off stations under the Hits Radio brand to subscribers of its Rayo Premium service. The first two were Hits Radio Country and Hits Radio Dance with Hits Radio 10s becoming the latest addition.

== Programming ==
Network programming for England and Wales originates from Bauer's London headquarters or studios in Manchester & occasionally Newcastle.

In Scotland, it originates from Bauer's studios in Glasgow and Edinburgh.

Overnight programming and The Hits UK Chart on a Sunday airs across all Hits Radio stations in England, Wales and Scotland, originating from Bauer's London headquarters.

Until May 2022, CFM, Gem, MFR, Radio Borders and The Wave opted out of networked scheduling, during weekdays, and weekends respectively. This was replaced by networked programming.

As of 23 September 2024, Hits Radio in London, Norfolk and the West of England carry a revised version of the Hits Radio playlist, with some tracks replaced by remixed 'dance' versions; this is likely to fulfil the requirement for 'rhythmic' music on the former Kiss licences. Prior to September 2024, the local Bristol FM/DAB station and digital-only London service had followed the standard Hits playlist, which continues elsewhere.

- Scotland variations
  - Clyde 1 and Clyde 1 Ayrshire share a regional breakfast show.
  - Forth 1, MFR, Northsound 1 and Tay FM share a regional breakfast show.
  - Clyde 1 and Clyde 1 Ayrshire air Superscoreboard, with live football commentaries at weekends throughout the season, alongside a nightly magazine show on weekday evenings from 6 to 8 pm.
  - The Big Saturday Football Show airs on Saturday afternoons (2pm-6pm) on Forth 1, MFR, Northsound 1 and Tay FM. Whereas, Superscoreboard airs on Clyde 1 and Clyde 1 Ayrshire.

== News ==
Bauer's newsrooms across the UK air local news bulletins hourly from 6 am to 7 pm on weekdays and from 7 am to 1 pm on Saturdays and Sundays.

Headlines are broadcast on the half-hour during weekday breakfast and drivetime shows, alongside traffic bulletins. National bulletins air on Hits Radio UK.

At weekends, bespoke networked bulletins air from 2 pm (until 6 pm on Saturdays and 4 pm on Sundays) - separate bulletins are produced for England & Wales and for Scotland.

At all other times, mainly evening & overnight, hourly national bulletins originate from Sky News Radio in London.

== Notable presenters/shows ==
- Gemma Atkinson
- James Barr
- Will Best
- Wes Butters
- Sarah-Jane Crawford
- Fleur East
- Stephanie Hirst
- Joel Ross (Hits Radio 00s)
- Sam Thompson
- Brooke Vincent
- Owen Warner
- Kimberly Wyatt
- Steve & Karen's Breakfast Show (Hits Radio 90s)
