= D. Scott Rogo =

American writer and parapsychologist (1950–1990)

- Born: Douglas Scott Rogo; February 1, 1950; Los Angeles
- Died: August 18, 1990 (aged 40); Los Angeles
- Occupations: Writer, journalist, musician
- Writing career
- Pen name: D. Scott Rogo
- Period: 20th century
- Genre: Parapsychology

Douglas Scott Rogo (February 1, 1950 – August 18, 1990) was an American writer, journalist and researcher on subjects related to parapsychology. Rogo was murdered in 1990 at the age of 40. His case remains unsolved.

== Biography ==
He wrote or co-wrote 20 books and more than 100 magazine and journal articles, 7 books were reprinted in 2005 by Anomalist Books, Leaving the body was reprinted in 2008 by Simon & Schuster. Rogo was active at the Psychical Research Foundation (formerly at Durham, North Carolina) and at Maimonides Medical Center in Brooklyn, New York.

Born in Los Angeles, California, and educated at the University of Cincinnati and San Fernando Valley State College (now California State University, Northridge; he graduated summa cum laude from the latter institution in 1972. (His B.A. was in music; Rogo played the oboe and the English horn, and for two years played professionally with the San Diego Symphony and other ensembles.) Rogo served as a consulting editor for Fate Magazine for which he wrote a regular column; he advocated greater involvement by both researchers and skeptics in parapsychological research. He is most well known for his book written with Raymond Bayless titled Phone Calls From The Dead (1979) in which they describe an alleged paranormal phenomenon in which people report that they receive simple, brief, and usually single-occurrence telephone calls from spirits of deceased relatives, friends, or strangers.

In his book The Haunted Universe (1977) Rogo hypothesized that strange phenomena such as flying saucers and Bigfoot are really psychic projections that are produced by the minds of the observers themselves.

=== Death ===
Rogo was last seen alive on August 14, 1990. He was found by police in his home on August 16. He had been stabbed to death. There were no signs of a struggle although a number of Rogo's personal items were missing and his wallet was empty. The police later arrested 29-year-old John Battista. After an initial mistrial, he was tried and convicted of Rogo's murder in 1992. After lengthy appeals, his conviction was later overturned, due to prosecutorial misconduct, in 1996. His killer is still unknown and the case remains open.

=== Reception ===
In his memory, the Parapsychology Foundation established The D. Scott Rogo Award for Parapsychological Literature in 1992 to benefit authors working on manuscripts pertaining to parapsychology. The parapsychologist George P. Hansen wrote: "Scott was also a leading authority on the history of psychical research. In this I would estimate that there are only three or four people in the world who might be considered to be in his league. The breadth of his historical knowledge of the field was unsurpassed."

Rosemary Guiley has written "within the parapsychology establishment, Rogo was often faulted for poor scholarship, which, critics said, led to erroneous conclusions." The parapsychologist Douglas Stokes wrote that Rogo's Phone Calls From The Dead "was widely criticized in the parapsychological community for its generally sloppy and credulous nature."

Science writer Terence Hines has written Rogo was a proponent of pseudoscience as he had advocated a nonfalsifiable hypothesis in parapsychology.

Skeptical investigator Joe Nickell has heavily criticized Rogo for being "credulous". In his book Miracles: A Parascientific Inquiry Into Wondrous Phenomena, Rogo declared various cases to be evidence for genuine miracles. However, Nickell found possible naturalistic explanations that Rogo had ignored.

== Bibliography ==
=== Books authored by D. Scott Rogo ===
- NAD: A Study of Some Unusual “Other-World” Experiences. New York: University Books. 1970.
- A Psychic Study of “The Music of the Spheres” (NAD. Volume II). Secaucus, NJ: University Books. Inc. 1972.
- Methods and Models for Education in Parapsychology. Parapsychological Monograph No. 14. New York: Parapsychology Foundation, Inc. 1973.
- The Welcoming Silence: A Study of Psychical Phenomena and Survival of Death. Secaucus, NJ: University Books. 1973.
- An Experience of Phantoms. New York: Taplinger Publishing Company. 1974.
- Parapsychology: A Century of Inquiry. New York: Taplinger Publishing Company. 1975.
- Exploring Psychic Phenomena: Beyond Mind and Matter. Wheaton, IL: Theosophical Publishing House. 1976.
- In Search of the Unknown: The Odyssey of a Psychical Investigator. New York: Taplinger Publishing Company. 1976.
- The Haunted Universe: A Psychic Look at Miracles, UFOs and Mysteries of Nature. New York: New American Library. 1977.
- The Haunted House Handbook. New York: Tempo Books/Grosset & Dunlap. 1978.
- (Ed.) Mind Beyond the Body: The Mystery of ESP Projection. Harmondsworth, Middlesex, England: Penguin Books. 1978.
- Minds and Motion: The Riddle of Psychokinesis. New York: Taplinger Publishing Company. 1978.
- The Poltergeist Experience. Harmondsworth, Middlesex, England: Penguin Books. 1979.
- (Ed.) UFO Abductions: True Cases of Alien Kidnappings. New York: New American Library. 1980.
- ESP and Your Pet. New York: Tempo Books/Grosset & Dunlap. 1982.
- Miracles: A Parascientific Inquiry Into Wondrous Phenomena. New York: The Dial Press. 1982.
- Leaving the Body: A Complete Guide to Astral Projection. Englewood Cliffs, NJ: Prentice-Hall. 1983.
- Our Psychic Potentials. Englewood Cliffs, NJ: Prentice-Hall. 1984.
- The Search for Yesterday: A Critical Examination of the Evidence for Reincarnation. Englewood Cliffs, NJ: Prentice-Hall. 1985.
- Life After Death: The Case for Survival of Bodily Death. Wellingborough, Northamptonshire, England: Aquarian Press. 1986.
- Mind Over Matter: The Case for Psychokinesis: How the Human Mind Can Manipulate the Physical World. Wellingborough, Northamptonshire, England: The Aquarian Press. 1986.
- On the Track of the Poltergeist. Englewood Cliffs. NJ: Prentice-Hall, Inc. 1986.
- The Infinite Boundary: A Psychic Look at Spirit Possession, Madness, and Multiple Personality. New York: Dodd, Mead & Company. 1987.
- Psychic Breakthroughs Today: Fascinating Encounters with Parapsychology’s Latest Discoveries. Wellingborough, Northamptonshire, England: The Aquarian Press. 1987.
- The Return From Silence: A Study of Near-Death Experiences. Wellingtiorough, Northamptonshire, England: The Aquarian Press. 1989.
- Beyond Reality: The Role Unseen Dimensions Play in Our Lives. Wellingborough, Northamptonshire, England: The Aquarian Press. 1990.

==== Coauthored books ====
- Rogo, D. Scott, and Raymond Bayless. Phone Calls From the Dead. Englewood Cliffs, NJ: Prentice-Hall. 1979.
- Rogo, D. Scott, and Jerome Clark. Earths Secret Inhabitants. New York: Tempo Books/Grosset & Dunlap. 1979.
- Druffel, Ann, and D. Scott Rogo. The Tujunga Canyon Contacts. Englewood Cliffs, NJ: Prentice-Hall. 1980.
