= James Barr (presenter) =

British radio and television presenter

- Occupations: Radio DJ; TV presenter; podcaster; comedian
- Employers: Hits Radio; self-employed
- Known for: A Gay and a NonGay (podcast); Hits Radio Breakfast Show; MTV News

James Barr is British radio DJ, TV presenter, podcaster and comedian, who presents the podcast A Gay and a Non-Gay with Dan Hudson. Barr is an openly gay man and advocate for LGBT+ and mental health issues.

He has toured the UK with his comedy show Thirst Trap, as well as presented on MTV, and also hosts The Breakfast Show on Hits Radio with Fleur East and Will Best.

Barr has also written columns for Attitude magazine, as well as covered conversion therapy for the BBC, and hosted live coverage from the Isle of Wight Festival, Brighton Pride and Manchester Pride. He is a patron of several LGBT+ charities, including Student Pride.

== Career ==
=== Early work as a presenter ===
In 2017, Barr hosted the 2017 Student Pride Festival in London, alongside his role as a presenter on Heat Radio. Across his roles as a presenter on MTV, ambassador for Student Pride, A Gay and a NonGay podcast, and columnist for Attitude magazine, Barr has interviewed celebrities including Ariana Grande, Justin Bieber, Taylor Lautner, Chloe Grace Moretz, Troye Sivan, DNCE and Charli XCX, amongst others. He has also appeared as a panellist on Eurovision: You Decide and BBC Three docu-series I'm Coming Out. Barr and Kristen Meinzer briefly hosted a podcast called When Megan Met Harry: A Royal Wedding Cast, which covers the engagement and wedding of Prince Harry and Meghan Markle.

=== A Gay and a NonGay ===
Barr began the podcast A Gay and a NonGay in 2015, after his friend Talia moved abroad and asked him to look after her boyfriend Dan Hudson. The podcast centres around topical discussion from gay and non-gay perspectives, with James providing the gay perspective, and Dan Hudson providing the heterosexual perspective. According to Pods up North, the podcast has over two million listens as of 2020. The duo were due to take the show out on tour in 2020, but this was cancelled due to the COVID-19 pandemic. A Gay and a NonGay was nominated for the Best Entertainment Podcast in 2017 and won the Bronze Award for the 2018 Best Comedy Category at the British Podcast Awards. Since then, Barr has been part of the judging panel for the awards.

=== Comedy show Thirst Trap ===
In early 2019, Barr played a series of comedy shows at the Above the Stag Theatre, in Vauxhall, London. Titled Thirst Trap, Barr took the show to the 2019 Edinburgh Fringe Festival. After his appearance at the Edinburgh Fringe, it was reported that Barr would be working with STV Entertainment to develop Thirst Trap as a format.

=== Hits Radio Breakfast Show ===
In June 2019, it was announced that Barr would be joining the X Factor series 11 runner-up Fleur East, and radio host Greg Burns as the new hosts of the Hits Radio Breakfast Show, launching on 12 July 2019. The show is aimed at audiences aged 25–44. Six weeks after launch, it was announced that Barr, Burns and East would be taking the Saturday morning breakfast show; Saturday mornings with Fleur East, Greg and James features highlights from the weekday Hits Radio Breakfast Show.

=== Comedy show Sorry I Hurt Your Son (Said My Ex to My Mum) ===
In 2024, Barr's one-hour solo show Sorry I Hurt Your Son (Said My Ex to My Mum) premiered at the Edinburgh Festival Fringe and returned in 2025 in an expanded form. It drew on his own experience of domestic abuse in a same-sex relationship. Barr has described the show as “always about survival”, and says he consciously reframed his trauma into comedy so laughter could help defeat shame. The show has been performed more than 50 times in four countries, and was developed further with feedback from other comics and from guidance by writer-producer Russell T Davies.

== Personal life ==
During an interview with Celeb Mix Barr spoke about his coming out experience, noting that he experienced a negative reaction from his parents.

He has spoken in his stage work about the domestic violence he experienced in a long-term relationship.

== Awards and nominations ==
List of awards and nominations for James Barr
Award	Year (Note: Indicates the year of ceremony. Each year is linked to the article about the awards held that year, wherever possible.)	Recipient(s) and nominee(s)	Category	Result	Ref.
British Podcast Awards	2017	A Gay and a NonGay	Best Entertainment Podcast	Nominated	
British Podcast Awards	2018	A Gay and a NonGay	Best Comedy Podcast	Bronze	

== See also ==
- Hits Radio
- MTV News
