= Bauer City 3 =

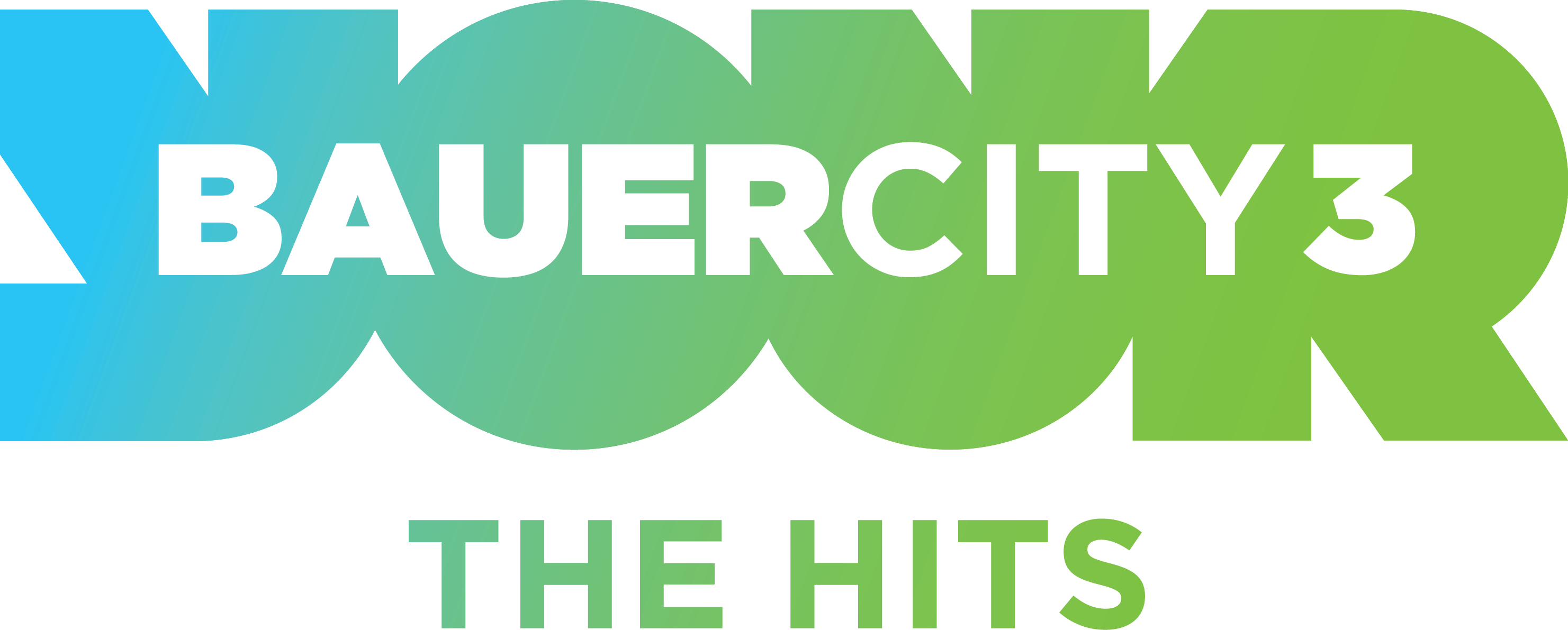
- United Kingdom
- Broadcast area: Scotland and Northern England
- Frequencies: DAB: 11B (Humberside, Liverpool, Teesside); 11C (Glasgow, Manchester, South Yorkshire, Tyne & Wear); 12A (Lancashire); 12D (Edinburgh, Leeds)
- Branding: Across The UK

Programming
- Language: English
- Format: Popular mainstream music

Ownership
- Owner: Bauer Media Audio UK
- Sister stations: Bauer City 1 (now Hits Radio Network); Bauer City 2 (now Greatest Hits Radio Network); The Hits (now Hits Radio UK)

History
- First air date: 19 January 2015
- Last air date: 31 August 2017

Links
- Website: The Hits (Now is Hits Radio website on Rayo; formerly Bauer Planet Radio)

Bauer City 3 (also known as The Hits) is a network of 12 popular mainstream music radio stations in Scotland and Northern England, owned and operated by Bauer Radio. This network was launched on January 19th 2015 with the national digital station, The Hits Radio absorbed into the new "City 3" network, before it was abolished and back broadcast to the national feed on 1 September 2017.

== Overview ==
From Monday 19 January 2015, The Hits on DAB was absorbed into the new Bauer City 3 network of stations. The new services were locally branded and identified, with the opportunity to split for individual local news, information, advertising and jingles, with The Hits content as a national programme feed.

Programming was broadcast among all Bauer City 3 stations in Scotland and Northern England, originating from the studios of Key 103 in Castlefield and Clyde 3 in Glasgow. Some other output was broadcast from Bauer's London Studios at Golden Square, Soho.

From 1 September 2017, the local City 3 branding of the stations on DAB was withdrawn, in favour of reverting to using The Hits name in all areas.

== Stations ==
- Clyde 3 (Glasgow and the West of Scotland)
- Forth 3 (Edinburgh, the Lothians and Fife)
- Hallam 3 (South Yorkshire and the North Midlands)
- Key 3 (Greater Manchester)
- Metro 3 Radio (Tyne and Wear, Northumberland and County Durham)
- MFR 3 (Scottish Highlands, Moray and Orkney)
- Radio Aire 3 (Leeds and West Yorkshire)
- Radio City 3 (Merseyside, Cheshire and North Wales)
- Rock FM 3 (Lancashire)
- Tay 3 (Tayside)
- The Hits (UK-wide on Freeview and online: now Hits Radio UK)
- TFM 3 (Teesside, County Durham and North Yorkshire)
- Viking 3 (East Yorkshire and Northern Lincolnshire)
