= Steve & Karen's Breakfast Show =

British radio show

- Genre: Music radio
- Running time: 240 minutes
- Country of origin: United Kingdom
- Language: English
- Home station: Hits Radio 90s Hits Radio 00s
- Hosted by: Steve Furnell & Karen Oxley
- Produced by: Danny Coucill
- Recording studio: Newcastle upon Tyne
- Original release: 1 June 1999
- Website: Steve & Karen's Breakfast Show

Steve & Karen's Breakfast Show is the Hits Radio 90s and Hits Radio 00s weekday breakfast show. It is presented by Steve Furnell and Karen Oxley (née Wight).

== History ==
The radio breakfast show began on Tuesday 1 June 1999 when Steve Furnell launched regional radio station Galaxy North East. Karen Oxley became his co-presenter in January 2001 after a year as senior broadcast journalist with the station.

Galaxy was rebranded as Capital North East on 3 January 2011 as part of a merger of Global Radio's Galaxy and Hit Music networks to form the nine-station Capital radio network. Furnell and Oxley were retained at the relaunched station.

On 14 July 2011, Metro Radio breakfast presenter Tony Horne left, prior to his contract ending. Furnell and Oxley were announced as his replacements two months later, remaining at Capital until 23 December 2011. The Steve & Karen Breakfast Show aired on Metro for the first time on 6 June 2012 after 5 months of being off-air due to a clause in the contracts issued by their previous employers, Global Radio.

The show resumed airing in Teesside and North Yorkshire on Monday 8 April 2013 when TFM merged with Metro and ceased all local programming apart from news.

On 17 April 2024 both Metro Radio and TFM were rebranded to Hits Radio with Steve & Karen’s Breakfast Show unaffected.

From 10-14 February 2025, no local breakfast programming was broadcast from studios in Newcastle. Instead, London based networked programming was relayed. This is because of the new Media Act which now allows 24/7 programming from outside the broadcast area.

On 20 March 2025, Bauer announced it would end its regional Hits Radio breakfast show for the North East and replace it with a new national breakfast show for England and Wales on 9 June 2025. However the pair will then present a new national breakfast show on DAB spin-off station Hits Radio 90s, and will be produced from Bauer's Newcastle studios.

On 10 June 2026, Bauer announced Steve & Karen's Breakfast Show would also broadcast on Hits Radio 00s, replacing Joel Ross' breakfast show. The music played during the show will remain specific to each station's decade.

== Awards and nominations ==
=== Arqiva Commercial Radio Awards ===
Year	Award	Entry	Result
2013	Breakfast Show of the Year (under 2 Million TSA)	Steve & Karen's Breakfast Show	Gold
2013	Presenter of the Year (under 2 Million TSA)	Steve Furnell & Karen Oxley	Gold
2014	Presenter of the Year (under 2 Million TSA)	Steve Furnell & Karen Oxley	Gold
2015	Presenter of the Year (under 2 Million TSA)	Steve Furnell & Karen Oxley	Silver

=== Sony Radio Academy Awards ===
Year	Award	Entry	Result
2013	Breakfast Show of the Year (under 10 million)	Steve & Karen's Breakfast Show	Silver

== Features ==
=== Current features ===
The show currently uses the following features in its broadcasts:

- First Bit Last Bit - Listeners get to hear the first bit and last bit of a song, film, tv show, advert or something else; and have to figure out what it is.
- Whose Mug Is It? - Steve or Karen have to use three words to describe the picture of someone famous dead or alive such as a celebrity, TV character, movie star, singer, historical figure, cartoon character or something else; without naming the picture from an envelope and have to figure out what it is and the caller has to name the correct picture of someone famous once they listened to the three words, winning a Steve and Karen Breakfast Show Mug.
- The Wonky Minute - Listeners come on and have to answer 10 questions correctly in one minute to win £1,000.
- Smashed Bits - Listeners get to hear two different pieces of audio smashed together and then they have to figure out the correct answers they end up with.
- Charva Choons - Every Friday, at 9:30am, listeners choose their favourite Charva Choon, a song typically heard in the club scene in the 90s and 00s.

=== Previous features ===
- Hummer Bummer - Steve or Karen hum a song and a caller must answer correctly.
- Missing Link - Karen gives a caller two things for them to guess the link.
- Morning Glory - Answer a question correctly and win the 'Morning Glory'.
- Tombola of Doom - Two contestants compete in answering some random questions in a certain amount of time. The player with the most points wins an 'I took on the Tombola of Doom and won' t-shirt.
- Baby Jukebox Generator - A song from the year a caller's child was conceived is played.
- Birthday Bangers - Call in if it’s your birthday for a treat and to choose a song from either Steve or Karen’s selections.
