= Hits Radio Manchester =

British radio station

- Manchester; United Kingdom
- Broadcast area: Greater Manchester
- Frequencies: FM: 103.0 MHz; DAB: 12C
- RDS: HITS_MCR
- Branding: Manchester’s Hits Radio; The Biggest Hits, The Biggest Throwbacks

Programming
- Format: CHR/Pop
- Network: Hits Radio

Ownership
- Owner: Bauer Media Audio UK
- Sister stations: Hits Radio UK; Hits Radio Pride; Greatest Hits Radio Manchester & The North West; Greatest Hits Radio North West

History
- First air date: 2 April 1974; 52 years ago
- Former names: Piccadilly Radio (1974–1988); Key 103 (1988–2018)
- Former frequencies: FM: 97.0 MHz; AM: 1151 kHz; 1152 kHz

Links
- Webcast: Hits Radio Manchester Player
- Website: Hits Radio Manchester

Hits Radio Manchester, formerly Key 103, is an Independent Local Radio station owned and operated by Bauer Media Audio UK as part of the Hits Radio network. It broadcasts to Greater Manchester.

As of September 2024, the station has a weekly audience of 311,000 listeners according to RAJAR.

== History ==
=== Piccadilly Radio ===
Originally known as Piccadilly Radio, the station commenced broadcasting from studios at Piccadilly Plaza in Manchester city centre at 5am on Tuesday 2 April 1974 - the fifth Independent Local Radio station to launch and the first of its kind in northern England. The first presenter on air was Roger Day and the first song played on air was "Good Vibrations" by The Beach Boys.

In early 1987, due to a nationwide reorganisation of the FM band, Piccadilly moved its VHF (FM) frequency from 97 to 103 FM. A year later, the Government and the IBA began encouraging all ILR stations with multiple frequencies to provide split programming in order to increase listener choice and competition.

=== Key 103 ===
Key 103 logo from 2008 to 2013

Piccadilly split its services into two on Saturday 3 September 1988. Key 103 launched at midday on 103 FM while the original Piccadilly Radio service continued on 1152 AM.

The first presenters on air were Tim Grundy and Rebecca Want. Other presenters included Peter Baker, Adrian Bell, Tony Michealides, Stu Allan. The first jingle package was produced by Stowe Bowden Wilson and featuring voiceovers from Steve Coogan. The first song played upon launch was Alive and Kicking by Simple Minds.

Positioning itself as Music, not music, Key 103 aimed at an upmarket audience with a mix of AOR and chart music and high-end specialist output including arts and business programming, comedy and weekly jazz, folk and classical music shows.

The station later opted for a more mainstream format with presenters from Piccadilly 1152 (later Piccadilly Gold) switching to the FM station, and in 1990, the station was rebranded as Piccadilly Key 103. The Piccadilly branding was gradually dropped during the 1990s.

In 1994, the station's owners Transworld Radio Group were bought by EMAP. Two years later, both Key 103 and its AM sister station moved from the Piccadilly Plaza studios to new headquarters at Castle Quay in Castlefield.

=== Hits Radio Manchester ===
On 18 April 2018, station owners Bauer Media announced Key 103 would be rebranded and relaunched as Hits Radio Manchester, a CHR-led music station aimed at 25-44 year olds on Monday 4 June 2018.

The station was merged with The Hits Radio to provide a single national service across the UK on DAB, Freeview and online - as Hits Radio UK In Manchester, Hits Radio continues to provide local news & information, traffic bulletins and advertising on its local platforms - 103 FM, DAB and online.

The Key 103 branding was phased out from Friday 25 May 2018 as the station entered a transition period ahead of the launch of Hits Radio at 6am on Monday 4 June 2018. The first song played on air - decided by an online poll via the Manchester Evening News - was "Greatest Day" by Take That.

The former Key branding was retained by the sister AM station, which rebranded as Key Radio on the same day as the launch of Hits Radio Manchester. The following January, the Key branding was retired when the station rebranded as Greatest Hits Radio Manchester.

== Technical ==
The station broadcasts on the analogue frequency 103 FM via a transmitter at Saddleworth, from where broadcasting commenced upon the launch of Piccadilly Radio on 2 April 1974.

The DAB signal is broadcast from transmitters located at Winter Hill and City Tower, Manchester on the CE Manchester multiplex. With the addition of Sutton Common, near Macclesfield, the DAB signal has a reliable coverage area that includes Greater Manchester, South Lancashire, most of Cheshire, parts of North East Wales and Merseyside, with much better reception than the FM frequency can provide as 103.0 suffers from co-channel interference from other stations on nearby frequencies.

In May 2016, two additional digital transmitters were launched at Littleborough and Saddleworth.

== Programming ==
Hits Radio network programming is broadcast and produced from Bauer’s London headquarters or studios in Manchester & occasionally Newcastle.

Hits Radio UK opts out from Manchester's local service for national news bulletins, traffic updates, relevant information and advertising on its national DAB and TV platforms.

=== News ===
Hits Radio Manchester airs hourly local news bulletins on the hour from 6am-7pm on weekdays and 7am-1pm at weekends. Headlines air at 30 minutes past the hour during Hits Radio Breakfast on weekdays, alongside regular traffic bulletins at breakfast and drive.

Syndicated national bulletins from Sky News Radio in London are carried overnight. Bespoke networked bulletins also air on weekend afternoons, produced from the Hits Radio Leeds newsroom.

== Presenters ==
=== Notable current presenters ===
- Fleur East (Hits Radio Breakfast)
- Angellica Bell (Hits Radio Breakfast; maternity cover)
- Gemma Atkinson and Mike Toolan (weekday drivetime)
- Wes Butters (Sunday mornings)
- Sarah-Jane Crawford (The UK Chart Show, cover)
- Stephanie Hirst (Saturday nights, Sunday evenings)
- Sam Thompson (weekday evenings)
- Owen Warner (Friday Night Hits)

=== Notable past presenters ===
- Stu Allan (deceased)
- Rich Clarke (now at BBC Radio Berkshire and Magic Radio)
- Robin Galloway (now at Pure Radio Scotland)
- Tim Grundy (deceased)
- Lucy Horobin (later at Heart Dance)
- Gethin Jones
- Jason King JK (now at Heart London)
- Geoff Lloyd
- Timmy Mallett
- Scott Mills
- Pete Mitchell (deceased)
- Justin Moorhouse
- Darryl Morris (now at Times Radio)
- Steve Penk (now at Happy Radio UK)
- Karl Pilkington (later at XFM London)
- Joel Ross (now at Hits Radio)
- James Stannage (deceased)
- Mike Sweeney (now at BBC Radio Manchester)
- David Vitty
- Becky Want
