= Hits Radio UK =

British national digital radio station

- Logo used since 2024
- Manchester London; United Kingdom
- Broadcast area: United Kingdom
- Branding: The Biggest Hits, The Biggest Throwbacks

Programming
- Language: English
- Format: CHR/Pop
- Network: Hits Radio

Ownership
- Owner: Bauer Media Audio UK
- Sister stations: Hits Radio Manchester; Greatest Hits Radio UK

History
- First air date: 1 April 2003 (as The Hits)
- Former names: The Hits Radio; The Hits

Links
- Website: Hits Radio UK

Hits Radio UK, formerly The Hits, is a British digital radio station based in Manchester and London, England, owned and operated by Bauer Media Audio UK as part of the Hits Radio network. It broadcasts across the United Kingdom.

As of September 2024, the station has a weekly audience of 4.6 million listeners according to RAJAR.

The station provides the network feed for all Hits Radio network stations.

== Overview ==
The national station launched on 1 April 2003 as The Hits. The station was rebranded on 4 June 2018 as Hits Radio UK. It relays its programming to the Hits Radio network, opting out with UK wide news & information, traffic bulletins and advertising.

Hits Radio UK broadcasts on DAB in many parts of the UK and online.

== Technical ==
The launch of Hits Radio UK in 2018 saw the station added to DAB multiplex transmissions in a number of local areas - mostly those served by Arqiva's NOWdigital multiplexes, as well as being made available on the CE Birmingham multiplex (replacing 'Magic Soul') and in stereo in London (replacing Kerrang! Radio and Absolute Radio 70s, which were removed on 23 May and replaced with a Hits Radio UK placeholder).

Hits Radio UK replaced The Hits on Bauer's DAB multiplexes and on the Arqiva-operated commercial Freeview multiplex. In addition, the new network was provided over the Sky satellite TV platform, on a channel previously occupied by Absolute Radio 70s.

On 13 December 2023, Hits Radio was removed from Sky, along with every other radio station owned by Bauer Media on the platform, including Absolute Radio, Absolute Radio 80s, Absolute Radio 90s, Absolute Radio Classic Rock, Hits Radio, Greatest Hits Radio, Kiss, Magic, Jazz FM and Planet Rock.

On 2 April 2024, Hits Radio was removed from Freeview, along with other Bauer Media radio stations on the platform, including Greatest Hits Radio, Kerrang! Radio, Kiss, Kiss Fresh, Kisstory and Magic Radio.
