= List of years in British radio =

The following is a list of years related to the indexing of British radio. Each year is annotated as a reference point.

== 1920s ==
- 1920 in British radio – January - The first informal and spasmodic broadcasts in the United Kingdom are made by the Marconi Company from Chelmsford in England. These broadcasts include both speech and music.
- 1921 in British radio –
- 1922 in British radio – The British Broadcasting Company is formed and on 14 November, the UK's first BBC broadcasts from London (station 2LO) take place.
- 1923 in British radio – First outside broadcast, the British National Opera Company's production of The Magic Flute from Covent Garden.
- 1924 in British radio –
- 1925 in British radio – First broadcasts from the long wave Daventry transmitting station and station 5XX becomes the first British radio station to achieve near national coverage: the first step in the establishment of the BBC National Programme.
- 1926 in British radio –
- 1927 in British radio – The British Broadcasting Company becomes the British Broadcasting Corporation, when it is granted a Royal Charter; First live sports broadcast on the BBC, a rugby union international. The first football commentary takes place a week later.
- 1928 in British radio – The first edition of The Daily Service is broadcast. It was originally called A Short Religious Service but was renamed The Daily Service later in the year
- 1929 in British radio – First broadcast of Week in Westminster.

== 1930s ==
- 1930 in British radio – The majority of the BBC's existing radio stations are regrouped to form the BBC National Programme and the BBC Regional Programme.
- 1931 in British radio –
- 1932 in British radio – The Empire Service (precursor of the World Service) launches, broadcasting on shortwave from Daventry's Borough Hill; King George V becomes the first monarch to deliver a Christmas Day message by radio.
- 1933 in British radio –
- 1934 in British radio – The new high-power longwave transmitter at Droitwich takes over from Daventry 5XX as the main station radiating the BBC National Programme.
- 1935 in British radio –
- 1936 in British radio – The Lisnagarvey transmitter begins service, broadcasting the Northern Ireland Regional Programme of the BBC.
- 1937 in British radio – The BBC makes its first outside broadcast when it covers the Coronation of King George VI and Queen Elizabeth at Westminster Abbey in London; Following the alteration of frequencies at the BBC's Washford transmitter to enable it to radiate separate regional services for Wales and the West of England, a new Welsh Regional Programme begins.
- 1938 in British radio –
- 1939 in British radio – The BBC Home Service starts broadcasting at the outbreak of the Second World War.

== 1940s ==
- 1940 in British radio – The BBC Forces Programme launches; First broadcast of Sunday Half Hour.
- 1941 in British radio –
- 1942 in British radio – First broadcast of Desert Island Discs.
- 1943 in British radio – Forces Broadcasting Service begins broadcasting.
- 1944 in British radio –
- 1945 in British radio – The BBC Light Programme starts broadcasting; First broadcast of Today in Parliament.
- 1946 in British radio – The BBC Third Programme launches and the BBC General Forces Programme closes; First broadcast of Down Your Way, Letter from America and Woman's Hour.
- 1947 in British radio – First broadcast of Round Britain Quiz.
- 1948 in British radio – First broadcast of Any Questions? and Sports Report.
- 1949 in British radio – First broadcast of A Book at Bedtime.

== 1950s ==
- 1950 in British radio – First broadcast of The Archers and Listen with Mother.
- 1951 in British radio –
- 1952 in British radio – All UK radio stations enter obituary mode following the death of King George VI.
- 1953 in British radio – The Coronation of Queen Elizabeth II is broadcast on the BBC Home Service and BBC Light Programme, with seven hours of coverage provided.
- 1954 in British radio – First broadcast of Children's Favourites.
- 1955 in British radio – Opening of the UK's first VHF/FM transmitter; first broadcast of From Our Own Correspondent.
- 1956 in British radio –
- 1957 in British radio – First broadcast of The Today Programme and Test Match Special.
- 1958 in British radio –
- 1959 in British radio – First broadcast of The Navy Lark, Sing Something Simple and Your Hundred Best Tunes.

== 1960s ==
- 1960 in British radio – First broadcast of Farming Today.
- 1961 in British radio –
- 1962 in British radio – First broadcast of The Men from the Ministry .
- 1963 in British radio –
- 1964 in British radio – The off-shore pirate station Radio Caroline goes on air as does Manx Radio, the Isle of Man's national radio station; first broadcast of I'm Sorry, I'll Read That Again.
- 1965 in British radio – First broadcast of The World at One, Petticoat Line and Round the Horne.
- 1966 in British radio – Terry Wogan makes his UK broadcasting debut on BBC Light Programme; the first regular stereo radio transmissions begin; Pirate station Swinging Radio England goes on air.
- 1967 in British radio – The UK Parliament passes the Marine Broadcasting Offences Act 1967 making it illegal for a British subject to be associated with off-shore pirate radio; the BBC's national stations are relaunched and BBC Radio 1 starts broadcasting; BBC Local Radio launches in Leicester; first broadcast of The Official Chart, The Radio 2 Breakfast Show and Just a Minute.
- 1968 in British radio – BBC Radio Nottingham hosts the UK's first ever radio phone-in.; First broadcast of The Living World.
- 1969 in British radio – Annie Nightingale makes her debut on BBC Radio 1 and is the station's first female presenter; first broadcast of Waggoners' Walk and The Organist Entertains.

== 1970s ==
- 1970 in British radio – United Biscuits launches its own radio station, United Biscuits Network, which is broadcast round the clock to the company's four factories; First broadcast of PM, The World Tonight and You and Yours.
- 1971 in British radio – The Open University begins broadcasts on the BBC; First broadcast of Lines from My Grandfather's Forehead.
- 1972 in British radio – The Independent Broadcasting Authority is formed, paving the way for the launch of Independent Local Radio; A decision by the government to restrict the BBC to twenty local radio stations, the corporation closes BBC Radio Durham and its resources are transferred to Carlisle where BBC Radio Carlisle, later BBC Radio Cumbria, is launched; First broadcast of Milligna (or Your Favourite Spike) and I'm Sorry I Haven't a Clue.
- 1973 in British radio – The first commercial radio stations start broadcasting, with London's LBC the first to go on air on 8 October, followed eight days later by the launch of Capital Radio; First broadcast of The Foundation Trilogy, Kaleidoscope, Newsbeat and Hello Cheeky.
- 1974 in British radio – Independent Local radio expands into mote areas with the launches of BRMB, Piccadilly Radio, Metro Radio, Swansea Sound, Radio Hallam, Radio City; Regular programmes for the Black and Asian communities launch on BBC Local radio stations in London and Leicester respectively.
- 1975 in British radio – BBC Radio Ulster begins broadcasting; First broadcast of The News Huddlines and Good Morning Ulster.
- 1976 in British radio – Independent Local Radio begins in Northern Ireland when Downtown Radio, begins broadcasting to the Belfast area; First broadcast of Quote... Unquote and The Burkiss Way.
- 1977 in British radio – BBC Radio Cymru begins broadcasting; First broadcast of Money Box, The News Quiz and Sport on Four.
- 1978 in British radio – BBC Radio Wales and BBC Radio Scotland begin broadcasting, the BBC's national radio stations change their MW and LW frequencies; First broadcast of The Hitchhiker's Guide to the Galaxy, Good Morning Wales and Good Morning Scotland.
- 1979 in British radio – BBC Radio 2 starts 24-hour broadcasting, having previously closed down between 2am and 5am; United Biscuits Network closes after nine years on air; First broadcast of Science in Action, Feedback, The Food Programme, Breakaway.

== 1980s ==
- 1980 in British radio – CBC in Cardiff becomes the first of the second tranche of Independent Local Radio stations to start broadcasting and is the first new ILR station since 1976; First broadcast of Radio Active.
- 1981 in British radio – First broadcast of Steve Wright in the Afternoon.
- 1982 in British radio – Regional programming on BBC Radio 4 ends; Last broadcast of Listen with Mother and Junior Choice.
- 1983 in British radio – First broadcast of In Business and Sounds of the 60s.
- 1984 in British radio – The BBC conducts five trials of community stations in Greater Manchester. Each trial, which covers a specific area of Greater Manchester, lasts for a few weeks; First broadcast of Delve Special.
- 1985 in British radio – Ranking Miss P becomes Radio 1's first black presenter; First broadcast of After Henry and Pirate Radio Four.
- 1986 in British radio – The Home Office sanctions six experiments of split programming on Independent Local Radio; First broadcast of Loose Ends and Last broadcast of Pirate Radio Four.
- 1987 in British radio – BBC Radio 1 starts broadcasting on FM in London; First broadcast of Flying the Flag and Citizens and Last broadcast of Radio Active and Delve Special.
- 1988 in British radio – BBC Radio 1 starts broadcasting on FM in many areas of the UK; local commercial stations start introducing gold services on their MW frequencies; Launch of the Radio Data System; First broadcast of The Big Fun Show, Whose Line Is It Anyway?, Saturday Night Fry and The Beeb's Lost Beatles Tapes.
- 1989 in British radio – BBC Radio Wiltshire launches, First broadcast of The Mary Whitehouse Experience and Last broadcast of After Henry.

== 1990s ==
- 1990 in British radio – Launch of BBC Radio 5 using the MW frequencies of BBC Radio 2, which thereby becomes the first national station in the UK broadcast only on FM; First broadcast of And Now in Colour, Jazz Parade, Flywheel, Shyster, and Flywheel, The Moral Maze and Formula Five.
- 1991 in British radio – The Radio Authority succeeds the Independent Broadcasting Authority as the UK's commercial radio regulator; Radio 4 News FM provides rolling news coverage throughout the Gulf War; Radio 1 becomes a 24-hour station, having previously closed down overnight; First broadcast of Essential Selection, On the Hour and 6-0-6.
- 1992 in British radio – The UK's first national commercial radio station, Classic FM, starts broadcasting, BBC Radio 3 stops broadcasting on MW; First broadcast of No Commitments, Room 101, The Mark Steel Solution and Knowing Me Knowing You with Alan Partridge and Last broadcast of Down Your Way, Flying the Flag, Flywheel, Shyster, and Flywheel and On the Hour.
- 1993 in British radio – Virgin 1215 starts broadcasting; First broadcast of Wake Up to Wogan, The Masterson Inheritance, The Pepsi Chart, Essential Mix and Harry Hill's Fruit Corner and Last broadcast of Jazz Parade and Knowing Me Knowing You with Alan Partridge; final broadcast of Steve Wright in the Afternoon on Radio 1.
- 1994 in British radio – BBC Radio 5 is relaunched as BBC Radio 5 Live, the first regional commercial stations start broadcasting; Radio 1 stops broadcasting on mediumwave; First broadcast of Wake Up to Money, Up All Night, Collins and Maconie's Hit Parade, Julie Enfield Investigates, Lee and Herring and Alan's Big One and Last broadcast of Room 101 and Formula Five; Steve Wright begins presenting The Radio 1 Breakfast Show.
- 1995 in British radio – The UK's first national commercial speech station Talk Radio starts broadcasting; First broadcast of Private Passions, Sunday Night at 10 and Change at Oglethorpe and Last broadcast of The Masterson Inheritance, Lee and Herring and Alan's Big One; Chris Evans succeeds Steve Wright as presenter of The Radio 1 Breakfast Show.
- 1996 in British radio – First broadcast of Chambers, Comedy Quiz, The David Jacobs Collection and Parkinson's Sunday Supplement and Last broadcast of Change at Oglethorpe and The Mark Steel Solution.
- 1997 in British radio – After Chris Evans leaves The Radio 1 Breakfast Show the show is presented by Mark and Lard for a few months, then by Zoe Ball and Kevin Greening; Chris Evans joins Virgin Radio and begins hosting a rival breakfast show on the same day Ball and Greening start theirs; Evans's Ginger Media Group subsequently buys Virgin from Richard Branson; First broadcast of Blue Jam and Westway and Last broadcast of Harry Hill's Fruit Corner, Collins and Maconie's Hit Parade and Comedy Quiz.
- 1998 in British radio – An overhaul of the BBC Radio 2 schedule sees several new presenters join the network; John Dunn retires as presenter of Radio 2's Drivetime programme and is succeeded by Johnnie Walker; Kevin Greening leaves The Radio 1 Breakfast Show, leaving Zoe Ball to present the show by herself; Virgin Radio begins simulcasting an hour of its breakfast show content with Sky One; Last broadcast of Week Ending, Kaleidoscope, Breakaway and Dance Band Days.
- 1999 in British radio – Launch of the Digital One multiplex; Britain's first £1m prize is given away on a segment of Chris Evans's Virgin breakfast show; Steve Wright in the Afternoon returns on BBC Radio 2 six years after programme's final broadcast on BBC Radio 1; Birmingham station BRMB stages the controversial Two Strangers and a Wedding competition; Cliff Richard's single The Millennium Prayer reaches number one in the UK charts despite being banned from the playlist of many radio stations; Last broadcast of Julie Enfield Investigates.

== 2000s ==
- 2000 in British radio – The first annual BBC Radio 2 Folk Awards are held; Chris Evans sells his Ginger Media Group to SMG plc for £225m; Zoe Ball leaves The Radio 1 Breakfast Show and is succeeded by Sara Cox; First broadcast of Sounds of the 70s and The Jo Whiley Show.
- 2001 in British radio – Compass FM launches, Chris Evans is sacked by Virgin Radio for poor timekeeping; Saga 105.7 FM, the first radio station aimed at an over-50 listening audience, is launched in Birmingham.
- 2002 in British radio – BBC 6 Music launches on 11 March, BBC 1Xtra on 16 August, and BBC 7 on 15 December; Jimmy Young leaves Radio 2 after 30 years as its lunchtime presenter; Last broadcast of The Pepsi Chart.
- 2003 in British radio – Jeremy Vine succeeds Jimmy Young as Radio 2's lunchtime presenter; Death of Alan Keith who, at 94, is Britain's oldest and longest serving radio presenter; Launch of Saga 106.6 FM in Nottingham.
- 2004 in British radio – Ofcom takes over the regulation of British radio from The Radio Authority; Chris Moyles takes over the breakfast show on Radio 1, while Scott Mills takes over as presenter of the network's drivetime show; 100.7 Heart FM presenter Tushar Makwana dies in hospital following a hit-and-run incident during a botched robbery attempt at his home; Final broadcast of Letter from America, radio's longest-running speech programme.
- 2005 in British radio – BBC Radio 3 twice clears its schedule to devote several days to the music of a single composer, with Ludwig van Beethoven and Johan Sebastian Bach; London's 102.2 Jazz FM closes after fifteen years on air and is replaced by 102.2 Smooth FM; The UK's first Islamic radio station, Islam Radio, is established in Bradford, West Yorkshire.
- 2006 in British radio – GMG Radio acquires the Saga Radio Group; Chris Evans succeeds Johnnie Walker as presenter of Radio 2 Drivetime; Last broadcast of It's Been a Bad Week.
- 2007 in British radio – All Saga stations are relaunched as Smooth Radio, with the London and Manchester Smooth FM stations also rebranding to Smooth Radio; Classic Gold and Capital Gold merge to create Gold; The RNIB launches Insight Radio, Europe's first radio station for blind and partially sighted listeners; Last broadcast of Parkinson's Sunday Supplement.
- 2008 in British radio – Virgin Radio is rebranded as Absolute Radio following its acquisition by Times of India; GMG Radio relaunches Jazz FM on DAB.
- 2009 in British radio – Terry Wogan presents his final edition of Wake Up to Wogan after announcing his plans to leave the Radio 2 Breakfast Show; Sunday Night at 10 presenter Malcolm Laycock leaves Radio 2 following a disagreement with his producer over programme content, and is succeeded by Clare Teal.

== 2010s ==
- 2010 in British radio – Smooth Radio is relaunched as a national station on DAB; Chris Evans takes over as Radio 2 breakfast presenter with The Chris Evans Breakfast Show, while Simon Mayo becomes Drivetime presenter; First Broadcast of Weekend Wogan.
- 2011 in British radio – BBC 7 is relaunched as BBC Radio 4 Extra; Simon Bates joins Smooth Radio to present Simon Bates at Breakfast and resurrects his Our Tune feature; Launch of Smooth 70s and Absolute Radio 70s; Last broadcast of The Jo Whiley Show on Radio 1.
- 2012 in British radio – GMG Radio (owners of Smooth and Real Radio) is acquired by Global Radio (the owner of stations such as Capital and Heart); Birmingham's BRMB and several sister stations are rebranded under the Free Radio banner.
- 2013 in British radio – Smooth 70s is closed after nearly two years on air; First broadcast of Sounds of the 80s and last broadcast of The David Jacobs Collection as David Jacobs leaves Radio 2.
- 2014 in British radio – Jazz FM stops broadcasting nationally on DAB from New Year's Day, but continues to air in London; London's LBC is launched as a national talk station on DAB; Smooth Radio is relaunched as a number of local stations; Simon Bates leaves Smooth after three years; London One Radio is launched to cater for London's Italian community.
- 2015 in British radio – Magic launches on Digital One; The VIP Lounge launches as an online station for blind and partially sighted listeners; Ken Bruce celebrates 30 years with Radio 2 and Last Broadcast of Weekend Wogan.
- 2016 in British radio – Launch of the second digital multiplex; Jazz FM returns to broadcasting nationally on DAB; Wireless Group launches Virgin Radio UK; Insight Radio is rebranded as RNIB Connect Radio; Robbie Shepherd retires as host of BBC Radio Scotland’s Take the Floor show after presenting for 35 years; Terry Wogan dies suddenly aged 77.
- 2017 in British radio – Radio Caroline is granted an Ofcom licence to broadcast on mediumwave to Sussex and North Essex; Nigel Farage joins LBC to present The Nigel Farage Show; First broadcast of Brexitcast.
- 2018 in British radio – Eddie Mair leaves Radio 4's PM programme and moves to LBC to present a Drivetime show; Chris Evans and Simon Mayo leave Radio 2; First broadcast of Radio 1 Breakfast with Greg James and Last broadcast of The Sunday Hour.
- 2019 in British radio – John Humphrys retires as presenter of Radio 4's Today programme; Zoe Ball takes over as presenter of The Radio 2 Breakfast Show while Sara Cox begins presenting Radio 2 Drivetime; Chris Evans joins Virgin Radio UK to present the Breakfast Show; Simon Mayo joins Scala Radio and is its inaugural presenter; The Danny Baker Show comes to an end after Baker is fired from BBC Radio 5 Live; Brexitcast begins airing on television in a late night Thursday slot on BBC One while continuing to air on radio.

== 2020s ==
- 2020 in British radio – The BBC announces major changes to the schedule across the network due to the COVID-19 pandemic; Rhod Sharp steps down as presenter of BBC Radio 5 Live's Up All Night after presenting the programme since its launch in 1994; BBC Radio 5 Live Sports Extra repeats live coverage of the 2019 Cricket World Cup; All regional Sam FM stations along with many other local English commercial stations become Greatest Hits Radio; Compass FM closes down at the same time for the same reason after 19 years; Radio Caroline broadcasts the Queen's Christmas Message for the first time, 56 years after its first request to do so was turned down; First broadcast of Sounds of the 90s and last broadcast of Brexitcast.
- 2021 in British radio – Woman's Hour celebrates its 75th year with a special message from The Queen; Boom Radio is launched to target baby boomers; UK radio stations enter obituary mode following the death of Prince Philip on 9 April; The first DAB multiplex for the Channel Islands begins broadcasting; Nick Grimshaw leaves BBC Radio 1 after 14 years with the station; RAJAR publishes its first set of post-COVID audience figures following an 18-month hiatus; Comedian Iain Lee launches the online station Radio Anywhere; Janice Long dies aged 66; The recording and release of many radio programmes are expected to be delayed due to the COVID-19 pandemic.
- 2022 in British radio – Permanent small-scale DAB multiplexes begin to go on air; The first full-time radio simulcast of a TV station begins when GB News Radio is launched on Digital One; Plans are announced to close BBC Radio 4's long wave service, BBC Radio 5 Live's medium wave frequency and BBC Radio 4 Extra as a cost-saving measure; The Queen's Platinum Jubilee is celebrated on radio; Boom Radio launches the companion station Boom Light; Steve Wright in the Afternoon ends after 41 years, with a mid-90s break of six years, on air; All UK radio stations enter obituary mode second year running following the death of Queen Elizabeth II on 8 September.
- 2023 in British radio – Figures released by BBC Sounds show there were 57.7 million listens to its content between 20 December 2022 and 2 January 2023; Absolute Radio stops broadcasting on MW; BRMB is relaunched in Birmingham; Broadcaster Paul O'Grady dies suddenly, aged 67; Changes are implemented in BBC Local Radio leading to greater networking of shows and the departure of many long-standing and well-known presenters; Commercial radio in the UK marks its 50th anniversary.
- 2024 in British radio – Launch of Boom Rock, which recreates the voice of Tommy Vance using artificial intelligence; the BBC announces the launch of four new national DAB stations and draws criticism from the commercial sector; BBC Radio 4's long wave opt-outs will end ahead of the switching-off of the station's long wave signal; Steve Wright dies suddenly two days before Valentines Day, aged 69; Johnnie Walker dies suddenly on New Years Eve, aged 79.
- 2025 in British radio – First broadcasts of Together with Gareth Malone and Next Level with DanTDM on Classic FM and Sunday Roast on KISS, and Final broadcasts of Your Place And Mine after 34 years and Trevor Nelson's Rhythm Nation after 6 years; Andy Ball dies suddenly on 28 January; Henry Kelly dies suddenly aged 78.
- 2026 in British radio – BBC Radio 4 ends its longwave broadcasts. The first Radio 2 in the Park event to be conducted in Scotland takes place at City Park, Stirling, having been rescheduled from between 7 and 9 August is held between 11 and 13 September to avoid it clashing with local events following the dismissal of Scott Mills. Sounds of the 80s and Sounds of the 90s on BBC Radio 2 move to earlier times of 6pm and 8pm respectively.

== Timelines of radio by history ==
=== Radio stations ===
- Timeline of the BBC
  - Timeline of BBC Local Radio
  - Timeline of BBC Radio London
  - Timeline of BBC Radio 1
  - Timeline of BBC Radio 2
  - Timeline of BBC Radio 3
  - Timeline of BBC Radio 4
  - Timeline of BBC Radio 5 Live
  - Timeline of the BBC World Service
- Timeline of Absolute Radio
- Timeline of Capital Radio
- Timeline of Classic FM
- Timeline of the Heart Radio Network
- Timeline of Hits Radio
- Timeline of Kiss
- Timeline of Magic
- Timeline of Smooth Radio

=== Radio companies ===
- Timeline of Bauer Radio
- Timeline of Global Radio

=== Nations ===
- Timeline of radio in Northern Ireland
- Timeline of radio in Scotland
- Timeline of radio in Wales
- Timeline of radio in England

=== Cities ===
- Timeline of radio in London
- Timeline of radio in Manchester

=== Other ===
- Timeline of BBC Radio News
- Timeline of digital audio broadcasting in the UK
- Timeline of independent radio in the United Kingdom
