= 1959 in British radio =

This is a list of events from British radio in 1959.

== Events ==
- The BBC Third Programme becomes available in Wales on VHF from Wenvoe transmitting station.

== Programme debuts ==
- 3 April
  - Pick of the Week on the BBC Home Service (1959–Present)
  - We're in Business (comedy series starring Peter Jones) on the BBC Home Service (1959–1960)
- 29 April – The Navy Lark on the BBC Light Programme (1959–1977)
- 3 July – Sing Something Simple on the BBC Light Programme (1959–2001)
- 25 November – Your Hundred Best Tunes on the BBC Light Programme (1959–2007)

== Continuing radio programmes ==
=== 1930s ===
- In Town Tonight (1933–1960)

=== 1940s ===
- Music While You Work (1940–1967)
- Sunday Half Hour (1940–2018)
- Desert Island Discs (1942–Present)
- Family Favourites (1945–1980)
- Down Your Way (1946–1992)
- Have A Go (1946–1967)
- Housewives' Choice (1946–1967)
- Letter from America (1946–2004)
- Woman's Hour (1946–Present)
- Twenty Questions (1947–1976)
- Any Questions? (1948–Present)
- Mrs Dale's Diary (1948–1969)
- Take It from Here (1948–1960)
- Billy Cotton Band Show (1949–1968)
- A Book at Bedtime (1949–Present)
- Ray's a Laugh (1949–1961)

=== 1950s ===
- The Archers (1950–Present)
- Educating Archie (1950–1960)
- Listen with Mother (1950–1982)
- The Goon Show (1951–1960)
- From Our Own Correspondent (1955–Present)
- Pick of the Pops (1955–Present)
- The Clitheroe Kid (1957–1972)
- My Word! (1957–1988)
- Test Match Special (1957–Present)
- The Today Programme (1957–Present)

== Ending this year ==
- 29 December – Hancock's Half Hour (1954–1959)

== Births ==
- 9 January – Andy Kershaw, world music presenter (died 2026)
- 11 April – John Myers, radio executive and presenter (died 2019)
- 22 May – Graham Fellows, comedy performer
- 6 June – Josie Lawrence, actress
- 2 October – Kevin Eldon, comedy actor

== Deaths ==
- 26 January – Larry Stephens, comedy scriptwriter (born 1923)
- 6 April – Collin Brooks, journalist and broadcaster (born 1893)

== See also ==
- 1959 in British music
- 1959 in British television
- 1959 in the United Kingdom
- List of British films of 1959
