= 1953 in British radio =

This is a list of events from British radio in 1953.

== Events ==
- 6 January – The Broadcasting Council for Wales meets for the first time.
- 2 June – The Coronation of Queen Elizabeth II is broadcast on the BBC Home Service and the BBC Light Programme, with seven hours of coverage provided; John Snagge is one of the commentators.
- 7 September – The BBC Third Programme broadcasts A Very Great Man Indeed, the first of seven comedy plays (to 1959) by Henry Reed featuring the fictitious lesbian avant-garde composer Hilda Tablet (played by Mary O'Farrell), with music by Donald Swann.
- 9 November – Morecambe and Wise get their first broadcast series, You're Only Young Once, on the BBC Home Service.
- 12 November – Writers Frank Muir and Denis Norden introduce the dysfunctional family of The Glums into comedy series Take It from Here and they become the most popular segment of the show. For this series, Joy Nichols has been replaced in the cast by singer Alma Cogan and actress June Whitfield (who plays Ron Glum's long-term fiancée Eth).
- Late 1953 – Lesley Saweard joins the cast of BBC serial The Archers to take over the part of Christine Barford which she plays until 2019, making her the world's longest-serving soap opera actor in any medium.

== Programme debuts ==
- 2 May – Variety Playhouse on the BBC Home Service (1953–1962)
- 29 July – A Life Of Bliss on the BBC Home Service (1953–1969)
- 2 August – Brain of Britain (as part of What Do You Know?) on the BBC Light Programme (1953–Present)
- 21 September – Journey into Space on the BBC Light Programme (1953–1958)
- 9 November – You're Only Young Once on the BBC Home Service (1953–1954)

== Programme endings ==
- May – PC 49 on the BBC Light Programme (1947–1953)

== Continuing radio programmes ==
=== 1930s ===
- In Town Tonight (1933–1960)

=== 1940s ===
- Music While You Work (1940–1967)
- Sunday Half Hour (1940–2018)
- Desert Island Discs (1942–Present)
- Family Favourites (1945–1980)
- Down Your Way (1946–1992)
- Have A Go (1946–1967)
- Housewives' Choice (1946–1967)
- Letter from America (1946–2004)
- Woman's Hour (1946–Present)
- Twenty Questions (1947–1976)
- Any Questions? (1948–Present)
- Mrs Dale's Diary (1948–1969)
- Take It from Here (1948–1960)
- Billy Cotton Band Show (1949–1968)
- A Book at Bedtime (1949–Present)
- Ray's a Laugh (1949–1961)

=== 1950s ===
- The Archers (1950–Present)
- Educating Archie (1950–1960)
- Listen with Mother (1950–1982)
- The Goon Show (1951–1960)

== Births ==
- 2 January – Iain Pattinson, comedy writer (d. 2021)
- 6 January – Paul Mayhew-Archer, comedy writer and producer
- 22 February – Geoffrey Perkins, comedy producer (d. 2008)
- 21 April – Jim Lee, radio continuity announcer and newsreader
- 1 June – Tim Bentinck, Australian-born actor and aristocrat
- 16 June – David Owen Norris, classical pianist, composer, academic and broadcaster
- 26 October – Roger Allam, actor
- 29 October – Lorelei King, American-born actress

== Deaths ==
- 9 April – C. E. M. Joad, philosopher and broadcaster (born 1891)
- 6 May – Harold Warrender, actor and quiz show host (born 1903)
- 30 September – Robert Mawdesley, stage and radio actor (born c.1900)
- 9 November – Dylan Thomas, Welsh poet and radio broadcaster (born 1914)

== See also ==
- 1953 in British music
- 1953 in British television
- 1953 in the United Kingdom
- List of British films of 1953
