= 1958 in British radio =

This is a list of events from British radio in 1958.

== Events ==
- 16 January – Ronald Mason produces and directs one of Brian Friel's earliest plays, A Sort of Freedom, for the BBC Northern Ireland Home Service.
- 29 March – The first averaged BBC Top 20 chart is broadcast on Pick of the Pops.
- 1 April – BBC Radiophonic Workshop created.
- 22 April – "Sunday Afternoon at Home", one of the most famous episodes of the radio comedy series Hancock's Half Hour, is broadcast on the BBC Light Programme for the first time.
- 2 July – The first radio ballad, The Ballad of John Axon, created by Ewan MacColl, Peggy Seeger and Charles Parker, is broadcast on the BBC Home Service.
- 28 August – Anton Bruckner's Symphony No 4 is performed at the BBC Proms, the first complete Bruckner symphony to be played in the concert series since 1903.
- 29 September – The BBC Light Programme's broadcasting hours are extended once again, now going on air 30 minutes earlier, at 6:30 a.m.

== Programme debuts ==
- 17 July – The Flying Doctor on the BBC Light Programme (1958–1963)

== Continuing radio programmes ==
=== 1930s ===
- In Town Tonight (1933–1960)

=== 1940s ===
- Music While You Work (1940–1967)
- Sunday Half Hour (1940–2018)
- Desert Island Discs (1942–Present)
- Family Favourites (1945–1980)
- Down Your Way (1946–1992)
- Have A Go (1946–1967)
- Housewives' Choice (1946–1967)
- Letter from America (1946–2004)
- Woman's Hour (1946–Present)
- Twenty Questions (1947–1976)
- Any Questions? (1948–Present)
- Mrs Dale's Diary (1948–1969)
- Take It from Here (1948–1960)
- Billy Cotton Band Show (1949–1968)
- A Book at Bedtime (1949–Present)
- Ray's a Laugh (1949–1961)

=== 1950s ===
- The Archers (1950–Present)
- Educating Archie (1950–1960)
- Listen with Mother (1950–1982)
- The Goon Show (1951–1960)
- Hancock's Half Hour (1954–1959)
- From Our Own Correspondent (1955–Present)
- Pick of the Pops (1955–Present)
- The Clitheroe Kid (1957–1972)
- My Word! (1957–1988)
- Test Match Special (1957–Present)
- The Today Programme (1957–Present)

== Births ==
- 29 January – Linda Smith, comedian (died 2006)
- 12 February – Michael Fenton Stevens, comedy actor
- 22 February – Gordon Kennedy, Scottish actor and director
- 3 May – Sandi Toksvig, Danish-born British comedy performer
- 14 May – Jan Ravens, actress and impressionist
- 29 June – Mark Radcliffe, radio broadcaster
- 30 July – Liz Kershaw, presenter
- 21 September
  - Simon Mayo, presenter
  - Penny Smith, presenter
- 7 October – Emily Buchanan, radio & tv journalist
- 5 December – Shaun Prendergast, actor
- 11 December – Pete Mitchell, presenter (died 2020)

== See also ==
- 1958 in British music
- 1958 in British television
- 1958 in the United Kingdom
- List of British films of 1958
- O'Gorman
