= 1955 in British radio =

This is a list of events from British radio in 1955.

== Events ==
- 17 April – Opening of Hancock's Half Hour 2nd series on BBC radio. Two days before it is due to be recorded Tony Hancock walks out of a theatre performance suffering from "nervous exhaustion" and flies to Rome. Harry Secombe is brought in at short notice to replace him in the radio series and stars in the first three episodes, making a guest appearance in the fourth (10 May) when Hancock returns. Andrée Melly joins the regular cast playing a French character.
- 2 May – Opening of Wrotham transmitting station in Kent, the UK's first VHF/FM transmitters.
- 22 September – The character Grace Archer is killed in a fire in the BBC radio serial The Archers, a spoiler for the launch of ITV on the same day.
- The Welsh Home Service becomes available on VHF from the Wenvoe transmitting station.

== Programme debuts ==
- 4 October – Pick of the Pops (1955–Present)
- From Our Own Correspondent (1955–Present)

== Continuing radio programmes ==
=== 1930s ===
- In Town Tonight (1933–1960)

=== 1940s ===
- Music While You Work (1940–1967)
- Sunday Half Hour (1940–2018)
- Desert Island Discs (1942–Present)
- Family Favourites (1945–1980)
- Down Your Way (1946–1992)
- Have A Go (1946–1967)
- Housewives' Choice (1946–1967)
- Letter from America (1946–2004)
- Woman's Hour (1946–Present)
- Twenty Questions (1947–1976)
- Any Questions? (1948–Present)
- Mrs Dale's Diary (1948–1969)
- Take It from Here (1948–1960)
- Billy Cotton Band Show (1949–1968)
- A Book at Bedtime (1949–Present)
- Ray's a Laugh (1949–1961)

=== 1950s ===
- The Archers (1950–Present)
- Educating Archie (1950–1960)
- Listen with Mother (1950–1982)
- The Goon Show (1951–1960)
- Hancock's Half Hour (1954–1959)

== Births ==
- 5 January – Jimmy Mulville, producer
- February – Dirk Maggs, Jersey-born radio producer
- 14 March – Felicity Finch, actress and reporter
- 5 April – Janice Long, née Chegwin, disc jockey (died 2021)
- 22 May – Dale Winton, broadcast presenter (died 2018)
- 31 May – Lynne Truss, writer, broadcaster and scriptwriter
- 14 June – Paul O'Grady, broadcast presenter and comedy performer (died 2023)
- Approximate date – Christopher Douglas, comedy actor-writer

== See also ==
- 1955 in British music
- 1955 in British television
- 1955 in the United Kingdom
- List of British films of 1955
