= 1957 in British radio =

This is a list of events from British radio in 1957.

== Events ==
- 25 July – Patricia Greene joins the cast of BBC's The Archers to play the character Jill Archer, which she will continue to do until shortly before her death in 2026.
- 2 September – The BBC Light Programme starts broadcasting at breakfast and now goes on-air each day, apart from Sunday, at 7am.
- 30 September –
  - Network Three launches, providing a service of adult educational programmes. It broadcasts on the frequencies of the Third programme, and is on air for 75 minutes each day, resulting in the Third Programme coming on air a little later in the evening.
  - The BBC Home Service's lighter content transfers to the Light Programme.
- September – For the first time, a chart rundown with the format of running through the charts of the week, playing the top tens from various music papers plus entries to top 20s, is introduced as part of Pick of the Pops.
- 28 October – The Today programme launches on the BBC Home Service as a programme of "topical talks" to give listeners an alternative to listening to light music which the Home Service had previously broadcast at breakfast.

== Programme debuts ==
- 1 January – My Word!, series run, on the BBC Home Service (1957–1988)
- April – The Clitheroe Kid, series run, on the BBC Home Service (1957–1972)
- Summer – Test Match Special on the BBC Third Programme (1957–Present)
- 28 October – The Today Programme on the BBC Home Service (1957–Present)
- Semprini Serenade on the BBC Light Programme (1957–c1982)

== Continuing radio programmes ==
=== 1930s ===
- In Town Tonight (1933–1960)

=== 1940s ===
- Music While You Work (1940–1967)
- Sunday Half Hour (1940–2018)
- Desert Island Discs (1942–Present)
- Family Favourites (1945–1980)
- Down Your Way (1946–1992)
- Have A Go (1946–1967)
- Housewives' Choice (1946–1967)
- Letter from America (1946–2004)
- Woman's Hour (1946–Present)
- Twenty Questions (1947–1976)
- Any Questions? (1948–Present)
- Mrs Dale's Diary (1948–1969)
- Take It from Here (1948–1960)
- Billy Cotton Band Show (1949–1968)
- A Book at Bedtime (1949–Present)
- Ray's a Laugh (1949–1961)

=== 1950s ===
- The Archers (1950–Present)
- Educating Archie (1950–1960)
- Listen with Mother (1950–1982)
- The Goon Show (1951–1960)
- Hancock's Half Hour (1954–1959)
- From Our Own Correspondent (1955–Present)
- Pick of the Pops (1955–Present)

== Station debuts ==
- 30 September – Network Three

== Births ==
- 28 January – Frank Skinner, comedy performer
- 16 March – Trevor Harrison, actor
- 22 March – Michael Mosley, Indian-born science presenter (died 2024)
- 12 May – Victor Lewis-Smith, broadcaster, producer, comedy presenter and columnist (died 2022)
- 9 July – Paul Merton, né Martin, comedy performer and broadcast panel show participant
- 24 August – Stephen Fry, comedy actor and broadcast panel show participant
- 7 August – Daire Brehan, Irish-born actress, broadcaster and barrister (died 2012)
- 13 September – Sally Boazman, BBC Radio 2 travel news reporter
- 3 October – Tim Westwood, DJ
- October – Moray Hunter, Scottish comedy writer-performer
- 24 November – Edward Stourton, radio news presenter (died 2026)
- 7 December – Winifred Robinson, radio presenter
- 9 December – Maria McErlane, comedy actress and radio presenter
- Approximate date – Garry Richardson, radio sports presenter

== Deaths ==
- 8 February – Mabel Constanduros, comedy actress and scriptwriter (born 1880)
- 1 May – Robb Wilton, character comedian (born 1881)
- 9 March – Rhoda Power, children's broadcaster (born 1890)
- 22 July – Robert Moreton, actor, scriptwriter and comedian, suicide (born 1922)

== See also ==
- 1957 in British music
- 1957 in British television
- 1957 in the United Kingdom
- List of British films of 1957
