= 1952 in British radio =

This is a list of events from British radio in 1952.

== Events ==
=== January ===
- 22 January – First broadcast of The Goon Show under this title on the BBC Home Service. Michael Bentine leaves the cast at the end of this series (15 July). After the start of the third series (11 November), Spike Milligan, the principal writer, suffers a nervous breakdown and is absent from performing and writing credits from the episodes commencing 9 December into 1953.

=== February ===
- 6 February – Following the death of King George VI, discovered at 7.30am, the BBC broadcasts the news (read by John Snagge) at 11.15am; the news is repeated seven times, every 15 minutes, and then the BBC goes silent for five hours.
- 15 February – State funeral of George VI: The funeral procession through London and ceremony inside St George's Chapel, Windsor Castle, are broadcast on BBC radio. The commentary by Richard Dimbleby subsequently receives comment for its poignancy.

=== March to July ===
- No events.

=== August ===
- 26 August – Hit radio series Welsh Rarebit, broadcast from the BBC Cardiff studios, transfers to television.

=== September ===
- 26 September – Comedy series In All Directions is first broadcast on the BBC Home Service. Unusually for this period, the script originates from improvisation between the two stars, Peter Ustinov and Peter Jones, edited by Frank Muir and Denis Norden. In the series, which continues to 1955, Jones originates his spiv character Dudley Grosvenor.

=== October ===
- 15 October – First broadcast of a series of Sherlock Holmes, with Carleton Hobbs in the title role, which will continue intermittently until 1969.

=== November ===
- No events.

=== December ===
- No events.

== Programme endings ==
- July – Calling All Forces, on the BBC Light Programme (1950–1952)

== Continuing radio programmes ==
=== 1930s ===
- In Town Tonight (1933–1960)

=== 1940s ===
- Music While You Work (1940–1967)
- Sunday Half Hour (1940–2018)
- Desert Island Discs (1942–Present)
- Family Favourites (1945–1980)
- Down Your Way (1946–1992)
- Have A Go (1946–1967)
- Housewives' Choice (1946–1967)
- Letter from America (1946–2004)
- Woman's Hour (1946–Present)
- Twenty Questions (1947–1976)
- Any Questions? (1948–Present)
- Mrs Dale's Diary (1948–1969)
- Take It from Here (1948–1960)
- Billy Cotton Band Show (1949–1968)
- A Book at Bedtime (1949–Present)
- Ray's a Laugh (1949–1961)

=== 1950s ===
- The Archers (1950–Present)
- Educating Archie (1950–1960)
- Listen with Mother (1950–1982)

== Births ==
- 4 February – Harriet Cass, radio newsreader and announcer
- 11 March
  - Douglas Adams, writer (The Hitchhiker's Guide to the Galaxy) (d. 2001))
  - James Fleet, actor
- 12 March – Chris Needs, Welsh radio host (d. 2020)
- 23 May – Dillie Keane, cabaret writer-performer and broadcaster
- 11 September – Catherine Bott, soprano and music presenter
- 10 December – Clive Anderson, broadcast presenter, comedy writer and barrister
- 26 December – Jon Glover, actor

== Deaths ==
- 19 April – Steve Conway, singer (b. 1920)

== See also ==
- 1952 in British music
- 1952 in British television
- 1952 in the United Kingdom
- List of British films of 1952
