= 1954 in British radio =

This is a list of events from British radio in 1954.

== Events ==
- 25 January – First broadcast of Dylan Thomas's radio play Under Milk Wood, two months after its author's death, with Richard Burton as 'First Voice', on the BBC Third Programme.
- 18 September – The Last Night of the Proms for the first time features the subsequently almost-invariable second-half coupling of Sir Henry Wood's 1905 Fantasia on British Sea Songs, Sir Edward Elgar's 1902 setting of "Land of Hope and Glory", Sir Hubert Parry's 1916 setting of William Blake's "Jerusalem", and "Rule, Britannia!".
- BBC Light Programme Saturday morning music request programme Children's Favourites, presented by Derek McCulloch ("Uncle Mac"), replaces Children's Choice.

== Programme debuts ==
- 2 November – Hancock's Half Hour on BBC radio (1954–1959 on radio)
- Antony Hopkins Talking About Music on the BBC Third Programme (1954–1992)

== Continuing radio programmes ==
=== 1930s ===
- In Town Tonight (1933–1960)

=== 1940s ===
- Music While You Work (1940–1967)
- Sunday Half Hour (1940–2018)
- Desert Island Discs (1942–Present)
- Family Favourites (1945–1980)
- Down Your Way (1946–1992)
- Have A Go (1946–1967)
- Housewives' Choice (1946–1967)
- Letter from America (1946–2004)
- Woman's Hour (1946–Present)
- Twenty Questions (1947–1976)
- Any Questions? (1948–Present)
- Mrs Dale's Diary (1948–1969)
- Take It from Here (1948–1960)
- Billy Cotton Band Show (1949–1968)
- A Book at Bedtime (1949–Present)
- Ray's a Laugh (1949–1960)

=== 1950s ===
- The Archers (1950–Present)
- Educating Archie (1950–1960)
- Listen with Mother (1950–1982)
- The Goon Show (1951–1961)

== Births ==
- 28 May – Andy Hamilton, comedy scriptwriter and performer
- 8 July – Mark Tavener, scriptwriter (d. 2007)
- 26 August – Steve Wright, DJ (d. 2024)
- 27 August – Andrew Marshall, comedy scriptwriter
- 21 November – Nigel Ogden, theatre organist (d. 2026)
- 27 November – Arthur Smith, comedian and radio presenter
- 1 December – Alan Dedicoat, newsreader and broadcast announcer
- David Miles, newsreader and broadcast announcer

== See also ==
- 1954 in British music
- 1954 in British television
- 1954 in the United Kingdom
- List of British films of 1954
