= 1948 in British radio =

This is a list of events from British radio in 1948.

== Events ==
=== January ===
- 3 January – Sports Report, the world's longest-running sports radio programme, debuts on the BBC Light Programme.
- 5 January – The first episode of Mrs Dale's Diary, the first significant British radio serial drama, is broadcast on the Light Programme.
- 28 January – The Copleston–Russell debate, a debate between Bertrand Russell and Frederick Copleston on the existence of God, is broadcast by the BBC.

=== February ===
- No events.

=== March ===
- 23 March – Radio comedy Take It from Here, written by Frank Muir and Denis Norden and starring Jimmy Edwards, is first broadcast on the Light Programme; this first series is set in a fictitious commercial radio station office.

=== April ===
- 12 April – Philosopher C. E. M. Joad is caught travelling by train without a valid ticket which ends his career as a BBC Radio broadcaster.
- 21 April – Ralph Vaughan Williams' Symphony No. 6 is premiered by the BBC Symphony Orchestra conducted by Sir Adrian Boult at the Royal Albert Hall in London and broadcast on the Home Service.

=== May to September ===
- No events.

=== October ===
- 12 October – Topical debate programme Any Questions? is first broadcast on the West of England Home Service chaired by Freddie Grisewood; originally intended to run for six fortnightly editions only, it will still be on the air weekly (on BBC Radio 4 nationally) 75 years later.

=== November ===
- No events.

=== December ===
- 26 December – The first series of the BBC's annual Reith Lectures, Bertrand Russell on Authority and the Individual, begins broadcasting on the Home Service.
- 28 December – For the second series of Take It from Here, writers Muir and Norden begin to adopt its familiar three-part sketch show format.

=== Undated ===
- Steuart Wilson becomes head of music at the BBC and Harman Grisewood replaces George Barnes as controller of the BBC Third Programme.

== Debuts ==
- 3 January – Sports Report (BBC Light Programme, 1948–Present)
- 5 January – Mrs Dale's Diary (BBC Light Programme, 1948–1969)
- 23 March – Take It from Here (BBC Light Programme, 1948–1960)
- 1 May – Top of the Form (BBC Light Programme, 1948–1986)
- 12 October – Any Questions? (BBC Home Service, 1948–Present)
- The McCooeys (1948–1955)

== Programme endings ==
- 29 March – Monday Night at Eight (BBC Home Service, 1937–1948)

== Continuing radio programmes ==
=== 1930s ===
- In Town Tonight (1933–1960)

=== 1940s ===
- Music While You Work (1940–1967)
- Sunday Half Hour (1940–2018)
- Desert Island Discs (1942–Present)
- Family Favourites (1945–1980)
- Down Your Way (1946–1992)
- Have A Go (1946–1967)
- Housewives' Choice (1946–1967)
- Letter from America (1946–2004)
- Woman's Hour (1946–Present)
- Twenty Questions (1947–1976)

== Births ==
- 8 March – Gyles Brandreth, writer, broadcaster and politician
- 14 April – Rob Cowan, classical music presenter
- 29 May – Michael Berkeley, composer and classical music broadcaster
- 9 June – Nick Clarke, news presenter (died 2006)
- 18 June – Philip Jackson, actor
- 25 August – Harriett Gilbert, radio arts presenter
- 30 August – Robin Lustig, radio news presenter
- 13 December – Andy Peebles, DJ (died 2025)
- 22 December – Noel Edmonds, broadcast presenter and producer
- Paul Lewis, financial broadcaster

== See also ==
- 1948 in British music
- 1948 in British television
- 1948 in the United Kingdom
- List of British films of 1948
