= 1946 in British radio =

This is a list of events from British radio in 1946.

== Events ==
=== January ===
- 3 January – American-born Nazi propagandist William Joyce is hanged, unrepenting, at HM Prison Wandsworth in London for high treason for his English-language wartime broadcasts on German radio.
- 20 January – Composer Granville Bantock writes to fellow composer Rutland Boughton criticising the BBC Music Department's attitude towards some newer composers.

=== February ===
- No events.

=== March ===
- 5 March – Have A Go with Wilfred Pickles and his wife, Mabel, is introduced; it is the first British quiz show to offer prizes (although these are limited to a few pounds and some home-made produce). Initially broadcast as Have a Go, Joe! on BBC Home Service North until August, from 16 September it is produced by BBC Manchester for national transmission on the Light Programme.
- 24 March – BBC Home Service radio in the UK broadcasts Alistair Cooke's first American Letter. As Letter from America, this programme will continue until a few weeks before Cooke's death in 2004.

=== April ===
- No events.

=== May ===
- No events.

=== June ===
- The BBC's regional director for Wales tells Welsh MPs that there is "not enough talent... to sustain a full continuous programme".

=== July ===
- No events.

=== August ===
- No events.

=== September ===
- 29 September – The BBC Third Programme launches at 6pm. The evenings-only service is devoted to broadcasting cultural and intellectual content, serious classical music and programming about the arts. Its first controller is George Barnes and its chief announcer is Alvar Lidell.

=== October ===
- 7 October – The BBC Light Programme transmits the first episodes of two daily programmes:
  - The magazine Woman's Hour (initially presented by Alan Ivimey), which will still be running nearly 80 years later.
  - The early-evening 15-minute serial thriller Dick Barton, which will achieve a peak audience of 20 million, predominantly schooboys.
- The BBC begins broadcasting a 2-month comedy series Heigh-Ho, its first script by Frank Muir, featuring Peter Waring, Kenneth Horne and Charmian Innes, and produced by Charles Maxwell; no further series is commissioned after Waring's criminal convictions come to light.

=== November ===
- No events.

=== December ===
- December – BBC correspondent Edward Ward with a sound engineer is landed on Bishop Rock lighthouse to give a report on life there but is trapped there for a month by the weather.
- 31 December – BBC General Forces Programme closes down.

=== Unknown ===
- The BBC adopts the Paris Theatre, a former cinema in London's Regent Street, as a studio for recording comedy and other shows before a live audience.
- Bush DAC90 bakelite radio introduced in the UK: it becomes the best-selling model for some years.

== Station debuts ==
- 29 September – The BBC Third Programme

== Closing this year ==
- 31 December – BBC General Forces Programme

== Debuts ==
- 4 January – Housewives' Choice (1946–1967)
- 5 March – Have A Go (1946–1967)
- 24 March – Letter from America (1946–2004)
- 7 October
  - Dick Barton – Special Agent (1946–1951)
  - Woman's Hour (1946–Present)
- 29 December – Down Your Way (1946–1992)

== Continuing radio programmes ==
=== 1930s ===
- In Town Tonight (1933–1960)

=== 1940s ===
- Music While You Work (1940–1967)
- Sunday Half Hour (1940–2018)
- Desert Island Discs (1942–Present)
- Family Favourites (1945–1980)

== Births ==
- 25 January – Pete Price, Merseyside media personality and radio presenter
- 4 February – Peter Allen, radio broadcaster
- 18 February – Michael Buerk, journalist and broadcast presenter
- 22 March – Jonathan James-Moore, radio comedy producer (died 2005)
- 5 April – Russell Davies, journalist, jazz musician and broadcast presenter
- 11 April – Bob Harris, broadcast music presenter
- 17 April – Henry Kelly, Irish-born broadcast presenter
- 7 May – Michael Rosen, children's poet and radio presenter
- 26 May – Simon Hoggart, journalist and broadcaster (died 2014)
- 2 June – Sean Street, radio broadcaster and poet
- 26 August – Alison Steadman, comedy actress
- 7 October – Jenny Abramsky, BBC Director of Audio and Music
- 13 October – Edwina Currie, Conservative politician, author and radio personality
- 31 December – Eric Robson, broadcast presenter
- Sue Limb, scriptwriter

== Deaths ==
- 3 January – William Joyce, 39, American-born propagandist
- 16 October – Sir Granville Bantock, 78, composer

== See also ==
- 1946 in British music
- 1946 in British television
- 1946 in the United Kingdom
- List of British films of 1946
