= 1973 in British radio =

This is a list of events in British radio during 1973.

== Events ==
=== January ===
- Test transmissions for the London music and entertainment Independent Local Radio licence using the VHF frequency 95.8 MHz for FM from the Croydon transmitter and the MW frequency 557 kHz (539 m) for AM from London Transport's Lots Road Power Station, Chelsea, begin. The location of the medium-wave transmitter and the frequency used are only temporary until a new high-powered medium-wave station at Saffron Green, Barnet, is completed. These tests commence a month prior to the IBA awarding the licence to Capital Radio.

=== February ===
- 4 February – David Rudkin's original radio play Cries from Casement as His Bones are Brought to Dublin is broadcast by the BBC, produced by John Tydeman with Norman Rodway in the title role.

=== March ===
- No events.

=== April ===
- 8 April – Kenny Everett briefly returns to BBC Radio 1 before moving to Capital Radio later in the year.
- 9 April – The first edition of daily arts (and, originally, science) review programme Kaleidoscope is broadcast on BBC Radio 4.

=== May ===
- No events.

=== June ===
- 1 June – Tony Blackburn presents his final Breakfast Show for Radio 1, having fronted the show since the station went on air in 1967.
- 4 June
  - Noel Edmonds succeeds Tony Blackburn as host of the Radio 1 Breakfast Show.
  - Tony Blackburn moves to the mid-morning slot and one of the new features of his show is an hour of records that charted in the same year. The feature is called The Golden Hour.
- 29 June – Programmes For Schools are broadcast on all Radio 4 frequencies for the final time. From next term they are aired only on VHF.

=== July ===
- 2 July –
  - Woman's Hour is transferred from BBC Radio 2 to BBC Radio 4.
  - BBC Radio 4 begins broadcasting hourly news bulletins during the day on weekdays.
- 13 July – Actor James Beck participates in the recording of two episodes of the first series of BBC Radio 4's adaptation of the sitcom Dad's Army as Private Walker for broadcast in 1974. The following day, he is taken ill, dying three weeks later.
- 23 July – The very first Radio 1 Roadshow takes place. It comes from Newquay, Cornwall and is hosted by Alan Freeman.

=== August ===
- No events.

=== September ===
- 10 September – Newsbeat bulletins air on BBC Radio 1 for the first time.

=== October ===
- 8 October
  - LBC (London Broadcasting) becomes the first legal Independent Local Radio station in the United Kingdom when it begins broadcasting at just before 6 am, providing talk radio to the London area.
  - At 6 am, the very first Independent Radio News bulletin is broadcast.
- 16 October – Capital Radio begins broadcasting a music-based general entertainment service to the London area.

=== November ===
- No events.

=== December ===
- 23 December – I'm Sorry, I'll Read That Again airs its last episode.
- 31 December
  - Radio Clyde, the first independent local radio station outside London, and the first in Scotland, begins broadcasting to the Glasgow area.
  - The first edition of Good Morning Scotland is broadcast. It replaces Today in Scotland which had been aired as an opt-out of BBC Radio 4’s Today programme.

== Station debuts ==
- 16 May – URB 963 (student radio station at University of Bath)
- 8 October – LBC
- 16 October – Capital Radio
- 24 November – BBC Radio Carlisle
- 31 December – Radio Clyde

== Changes of station frequency ==
Station	Moved from	Moved to
BBC Radio Oxford	94.9FM	95.2FM

== Programme debuts ==
- 11 January – Byron's Don Juan read by Ronald Pickup on BBC Radio 3 (1973)
- 7 April – Hello Cheeky on BBC Radio 2 (1973–1979)
- 9 April – Kaleidoscope on BBC Radio 4 (1973–1998)
- 6 May – The Foundation Trilogy on BBC Radio 4 (1973)
- 5 June – What Ho! Jeeves on BBC Radio 4 (1973–1981)
- 10 June – Frankie Howerd on BBC Radio 2 (1973–1975)
- 10 September – Newsbeat on BBC Radio 1 (1973–Present)
- 31 December – Good Morning Scotland on BBC Radio Scotland (1973–Present)

== Continuing radio programmes ==
=== 1940s ===
- Sunday Half Hour (1940–2018)
- Desert Island Discs (1942–Present)
- Down Your Way (1946–1992)
- Letter from America (1946–2004)
- Woman's Hour (1946–Present)
- A Book at Bedtime (1949–Present)

=== 1950s ===
- The Archers (1950–Present)
- The Today Programme (1957–Present)
- The Navy Lark (1959–1977)
- Sing Something Simple (1959–2001)
- Your Hundred Best Tunes (1959–2007)

=== 1960s ===
- Farming Today (1960–Present)
- In Touch (1961–Present)
- The Men from the Ministry (1962–1977)
- Petticoat Line (1965–1979)
- The World at One (1965–Present)
- The Official Chart (1967–Present)
- Just a Minute (1967–Present)
- The Living World (1968–Present)
- The Organist Entertains (1969–2018)

=== 1970s ===
- PM (1970–Present)
- Start the Week (1970–Present)
- Week Ending (1970–1998)
- You and Yours (1970–Present)
- I'm Sorry I Haven't a Clue (1972–Present)

== Ending this year ==
- 23 December – I'm Sorry, I'll Read That Again (1964–1973)

== Births ==
- 27 January – Lucy Porter, comedian
- 12 March – Mishal Husain, broadcast news presenter
- 24 April – Gabby Logan, radio and television presenter
- 8 May – Marcus Brigstocke, comedian
- 14 May – Clare Teal, jazz singer and radio presenter
- 24 May – Matthew Rudd, radio presenter
- 2 June – Arlo White, sports commentator
- 20 August – Stephen Nolan, Northern Ireland broadcaster
- September – Tim Harford, economist
- 17 September – Jason Mohammad, Welsh radio and television sports presenter
- 3 October – Grace Dent, broadcaster, restaurant critic and YA author
- 11 October – Mark Chapman, broadcaster and newsreader

== Deaths ==
- 6 June – Jimmy Clitheroe, comic entertainer, overdose (born 1921)
- 27 October – Howard Marshall, radio commentator (born 1900)

== See also ==
- 1973 in British music
- 1973 in British television
- 1973 in the United Kingdom
- List of British films of 1973
