= 1988 in British radio =

This is a list of events in British radio during 1988.

== Events ==
- 1988 sees regular evening programming begin to appear on weeknights on BBC local radio. The programming tends to be regional rather than local with the same programme networked on all the stations in that area. Consequently, these stations are now providing local/regional programming on weeknights until midnight.

=== January ===
- Undated in January
  - BBC Radio 1 has a ‘’More Music Day’’ which limited presenter chat to news, weather and travel. It has been designed as an answer to those thinking that DJs talk too much, but has not been repeated.
  - Radio Tees is relaunched as TFM.
- 15 January – Less than a year after their introduction, the World Service News bulletins on BBC Radio 3 are broadcast for the final time.

=== February ===
- 1 February – Radio 4's long-wave frequency is adjusted from 200 kHz to 198 kHz.

=== March ===
- 2 March – Soundtrack on BBC Radio 4 is inaugurated with broadcaster Glyn Worsnip’s autobiographical audio diary of living with a serious medical condition, A Lone Voice, attracting substantial listener engagement.

=== April ===
- 1 April – Sue Lawley replaces Michael Parkinson as host of Desert Island Discs.
- 11 April – BBC Somerset Sound launches as an opt-out station from BBC Radio Bristol, broadcasting on BBC Radio Bristol's former MW frequency of 1323AM.

=== May ===
- 17 May – Mike Smith presents the Radio 1 Breakfast Show for the final time. It is a special presented from Gatwick Airport in which the winners of the Sound Experience competition prepare to embark on a trip to Walt Disney World.
- 23 May – Simon Mayo takes over as presenter of the Radio 1 Breakfast Show.

=== June ===
- 1 June – County Sound becomes the first station to introduce full time split programming on FM and AM. On FM, County Sound is renamed as County Sound Premier with a brand new oldies station called County Sound Gold launching on MW. This is to be the format used by most stations when they end simulcasting with their chart and contemporary music format continuing on FM with a new oldies station launching on MW.

=== July ===
- 1 July – The Superstation launches an overnight sustaining service on a number of ILR stations around the country at 10pm. The service would run until 6am each morning.
- 2 July – Capital Gold starts broadcasting, initially as a weekend only service. Tony Blackburn launches the station on 1548AM at 7am.

=== August ===
- 12 August – Radio Clyde launches a weekend-only chart music service on FM, with the full Radio Clyde service continuing on MW.
- 29 August – BBC Radio 1 borrows BBC Radio 2’s FM frequencies on a bank holiday afternoon for the final time.

=== September ===
- 1 September
  - The Radio 1 FM 'switch on' day which sees three new transmitters brought into service covering central Scotland, the north of England and the Midlands. With 65% of the UK now covered by the station's new FM frequency, the pop group Bros fly around the country in a helicopter to encourage listeners to switch over.
  - To coincide with the switch-ons, Top of the Pops is simulcast on Radio 1 for the first time giving listeners the chance to hear the programme in stereo.
- 3 September – At midday, Manchester station Piccadilly Radio splits into two services. Piccadilly Radio is relaunched as an oldies station on MW called Piccadilly Gold with a new station, Key 103, launching on FM.
- 20 September – The Radio Data System (RDS) launches, allowing car radios to retune automatically, display station identifiers and switch to local travel news.
- 29 September
  - BBC Radio 1 'borrows' BBC Radio 2's FM frequencies on a weeknight for the final time.
  - Radio 1 starts broadcasting on FM in South Wales and the west of England.
- Undated in September – The Independent Broadcasting Authority announces the launch of incremental radio. The new licenses will cover areas which are already served by an ILR (Independent Local Radio) station and will offer output not already available on ILR, such as specialist music, programmes for a specific section of the community or for smaller areas than ILR stations currently broadcast to.

=== October ===
- 1 October – BBC Radio 1 extends broadcasting hours, closing down at 2 am instead of midnight.
- 4 October – Launch of GEM-AM, the result of a split between Radio Trent and Leicester Sound's FM and medium wave frequencies.
- 7 October – After 18 years on air BBC Radio London closes at 7 pm. Test transmissions begin immediately for its replacement, BBC GLR, which launches on 25 October.
- 9 October – The BBC announces that a fifth national network will launch on the MW frequencies of BBC Radio 2.
- 30 October
  - BBC Radio Manchester is renamed BBC GMR.
  - The Asian Network launches as a 70 hours-a-week service on the MW transmitters of BBC Radio Leicester and BBC Radio WM.

=== November ===
- 1 November – Capital Gold becomes a full time station, having been a weekend-only service since July.
- 25 November – BBC Radio 1 starts broadcasting on FM in Belfast and Oxfordshire. To mark the event, the breakfast show and Simon Bates programmes are broadcast live from the two areas.

=== December ===
- 4 December – Ocean Sound creates two new radio stations as part of the relaxing of ILR licensing rules. Aimed as a direct competitor for BBC Radio 1, Power FM becomes the UK's first 24-hour non-stop chart hit music station, broadcasting to Southampton and Winchester using the 103.2FM frequency. The Gold AM replaces Ocean Sound on medium-wave. It is a pacey, lively radio station playing a mixture of music from the '60s and '70s. Ocean Sound continues its full service operation on the 96.7 FM and 97.5 FM frequencies.
- Undated in December – The Independent Broadcasting Authority announces the areas which will be served by incremental radio with the first five of the 20 licenses to be offered the following month.

== Station debuts ==
- 11 April – BBC Somerset Sound
- 1 June – Premier Radio and County Sound Gold
- 1 July – The Superstation
- 2 July – Capital Gold (weekends only – full time from 1 November)
- 3 September – Key 103 and Piccadilly Gold
- 3 October – BBC Radio Gloucestershire
- 4 October – GEM-AM
- 25 October – BBC GLR
- 31 October – Viking Gold
- 15 November – Brunel Classic Gold
- November – Supergold
- 4 December – Power FM and The Gold AM

== Programme debuts ==
- January – The Big Fun Show on BBC Radio 4 (1988)
- 2 January – Whose Line Is It Anyway? on BBC Radio 4 (1988)
- 13 February – Lenin of the Rovers on BBC Radio 4 (1988–1989)
- 30 April – Saturday Night Fry on BBC Radio 4 (1988)
- 21 July – Uncle Mort's North Country on BBC Radio 4 (1988)
- 1 September – Top of the Pops on BBC Radio 1 (as a simulcast from BBC1) (1988–1991)
- 25 September – Thirty Minutes Worth on BBC Radio 2 (1988)
- 1 October – The Beeb's Lost Beatles Tapes on BBC Radio 1 (1988)
- October – All in the Mind on BBC Radio 4 (1988–Present)
- 1 November – Second Thoughts on BBC Radio 4 (1988–1992)
- November – Megamix on BBC World Service (1988–1998)
- Newshour on BBC World Service (1988–Present)

== Continuing radio programmes ==
=== 1940s ===
- Sunday Half Hour (1940–2018)
- Desert Island Discs (1942–Present)
- Down Your Way (1946–1992)
- Letter from America (1946–2004)
- Woman's Hour (1946–Present)
- A Book at Bedtime (1949–Present)

=== 1950s ===
- The Archers (1950–Present)
- The Today Programme (1957–Present)
- Sing Something Simple (1959–2001)
- Your Hundred Best Tunes (1959–2007)

=== 1960s ===
- Farming Today (1960–Present)
- In Touch (1961–Present)
- The World at One (1965–Present)
- The Official Chart (1967–Present)
- Just a Minute (1967–Present)
- The Living World (1968–Present)
- The Organist Entertains (1969–2018)

=== 1970s ===
- PM (1970–Present)
- Start the Week (1970–Present)
- Week Ending (1970–1998)
- You and Yours (1970–Present)
- I'm Sorry I Haven't a Clue (1972–Present)
- Good Morning Scotland (1973–Present)
- Kaleidoscope (1973–1998)
- Newsbeat (1973–Present)
- The News Huddlines (1975–2001)
- File on 4 (1977–Present)
- Money Box (1977–Present)
- The News Quiz (1977–Present)
- Breakaway (1979–1998)
- Feedback (1979–Present)
- The Food Programme (1979–Present)
- Science in Action (1979–Present)

=== 1980s ===
- In Business (1983–Present)
- Sounds of the 60s (1983–Present)
- After Henry (1985–1989)
- Loose Ends (1986–Present)
- Flying the Flag (1987–1992)
- Citizens (1987–1991)

== Ending this year ==
- February – The Big Fun Show (1988)
- 6 February – Whose Line Is It Anyway? (1988)
- 4 June – Saturday Night Fry (1988)
- 31 December – The Beeb's Lost Beatles Tapes (1988)

== Closing this year ==
- 7 October – BBC Radio London (1970–1988)

== Births ==
- 9 January – Glyn Wise, Welsh broadcast personality, runner-up, Big Brother 2006
- 9 April – Dotty, born Ashley Charles, rapper and DJ
- 3 November – Jamie Laing, broadcast presenter, investor and television actor

== Deaths ==
- 6 February – Marghanita Laski, writer and radio panellist (born 1915)
- 27 February – Basil Boothroyd, scriptwriter (born 1910)
- 15 April – Kenneth Williams, comic actor (born 1926)
- 7 July – Jimmy Edwards, comic actor (born 1920)
- 21 August – Chris Gittins, character actor (born 1902)
- 28 October – Jack de Manio, presenter (born 1914)

== See also ==
- 1988 in British music
- 1988 in British television
- 1988 in the United Kingdom
- List of British films of 1988
