= 1940 in British radio =

This is a list of events from British radio in 1940.

== Events ==
=== January ===
- 7 January – The BBC Forces Programme begins broadcasting in the United Kingdom; it becomes the most popular channel among civilians at home as well as its primary target audience.

=== February ===
- 7 February – The BBC Overseas Service begins Bulgarian language programming, the first of 18 new foreign-language service it will introduce by the end of the year.
- 25 February – The Proud Valley is the first known film to have its premiere on radio when the BBC broadcasts a 60-minute version.
- 29 February – Welsh Rarebit first broadcast by the BBC from its Cardiff studio; the resident 25-strong male voice choir, the Lyrian Singers, premieres the song "We'll Keep a Welcome" with music by the programme's producer Mai Jones.

=== March ===
- 20 March – Antisemitic MP Archibald Maule Ramsay uses a Parliamentary question to set out the times and frequency of nightly broadcasts by the 'New British Broadcasting Service', a Nazi propaganda radio station broadcasting from Germany.

=== April ===
- 9 April – The BBC Overseas Service begins Danish and Norwegian programming.
- 11 April – The BBC Overseas Service begins Dutch language programming.

=== May ===
- May – The evacuated BBC Radio Variety Department relocates to Bangor in north Wales from where it will broadcast until August 1943.
- 10 May (9.00 pm) – Neville Chamberlain makes the first public announcement of his resignation as Prime Minister of the United Kingdom, and his replacement by Winston Churchill, on the BBC Home Service.
- 11 May – The BBC Overseas Service begins Hindi programming.
- 14 May – BBC reporter Charles Gardner working in Reims incorporates the live sounds of a German air raid in a broadcast report.

=== June ===
- 2 June – Secretary of State for War Anthony Eden gives a radio address claiming success of the Dunkirk evacuation.
- 5 June – Yorkshire-born novelist and playwright J. B. Priestley broadcasts his first Sunday evening radio Postscript, "An excursion to hell", on the BBC Home Service, marking the role of the pleasure steamers in the Dunkirk evacuation, just completed.
- 8 June – BBC airs the first weekly episode of Radio Rhythm Club, a programme of jazz and rhythm music presented by Charles Chilton. On 29 June, it broadcasts its first associated jam session.
- 18 June
  - General Charles de Gaulle, de facto leader of the Free French Forces in World War II, uses the airwaves of the BBC to make his Appeal of 18 June from London to the French people for resistance to the German occupation of France.
  - Prime minister Winston Churchill repeats his "This was their finest hour" speech, made earlier in the day to the House of Commons, on the BBC Home Service.
- 23 June – Music While You Work debuts on the BBC Home Service (mornings) and BBC Forces Programme (afternoons).
- 26 June – Secretary of State for War Anthony Eden broadcasts to the British people.
- June – Mrs Olive Baker (mistress of Barry Domvile) is arrested for distributing leaflets promoting Nazi propaganda station Reichssender Hamburg in Britain. She tries to commit suicide in prison and is sentenced to five years' imprisonment.

=== July ===
- 13 July – BBC newsreaders first identify themselves by name on air, beginning with Frank Phillips on today's lunchtime bulletin.
- 14 July – The BBC Home Service 9.00 pm news bulletin includes a vivid account of an air battle over the English Channel recorded live the previous day by reporter Charles Gardner. The bulletin is preceded by a speech by Churchill, "The War of the Unknown Warriorsˮ, and followed by J. B. Priestley's Postscript describing the seaside resort of Margate in wartime.
- 19 July
  - Adolf Hitler makes a peace appeal ("appeal to reason") to Britain in an address to the Reichstag, broadcast simultaneously in English translation by Paul Schmidt. BBC German-language broadcaster Sefton Delmer unofficially rejects it at once and Lord Halifax, British foreign minister, flatly rejects peace terms in a broadcast reply on 22 July.
  - Radio Caledonia, ostensibly a nationalist anti-government station of a Scottish Peace Front but in fact a black propaganda operation of the Nazi Büro Concordia, begins broadcasting to Scotland, presented by Donald Grant. It continues nightly broadcasts intermittently until 24 July 1942, although with poor reception.
- 28 July – The BBC Overseas Service begins broadcasting Radio Oranje, supported by the Dutch government-in-exile, to the German-occupied Netherlands.

=== August ===
- August – This year's National Eisteddfod of Wales becomes a purely radio event, with broadcasts on the BBC Home Service.
- 10 August – This and the following year's abbreviated seasons of The Proms are without sponsorship by the BBC.

=== September ===
- 2 September – The BBC Overseas Service begins broadcasting Burmese programming.
- 28 September – The BBC Overseas Service begins broadcasting Radio Belgique/Radio Belgie, supported by the Belgian government in exile, to German-occupied Belgium.

=== October ===
- 15 October – Seven staff are killed when an attempt to eject a delayed-action German bomb from Broadcasting House in London fails. Listeners to the nine o'clock evening news bulletin hear a dull thud as it explodes but newsreader Bruce Belfrage continues unperturbed though covered in debris.

=== November ===
- 12 November – The BBC Overseas Service begins broadcasting the BBC Albanian Service.

=== December ===
- 8 December – Explosion of a land mine outside Broadcasting House in central London causes the BBC's European service to be evacuated to its Maida Vale Studios.

== Station debuts ==
- 7 January: BBC Forces Programme (1940–1944)

== Debuts ==
- 13 January – Garrison Theatre, BBC Home Service, later Forces Programme (1940–1941)
- 29 February – Welsh Rarebit, BBC Forces Programme (1940–1944, 1948–1952)
- 23 June – Music While You Work, BBC Home Service and BBC Forces Programme (1940–1967)
- 14 July – Sunday Half Hour, BBC Home Service (1940–2018)
- Summer – The Kitchen Front, BBC Home Service

== Programme endings ==
- Band Waggon, BBC (1938–1940)

== Continuing radio programmes ==
=== 1930s ===
- In Town Tonight (1933–1960)

== Births ==
- 2 February – David Jason, broadcast comedy actor
- 1 April – Annie Nightingale, radio music presenter (died 2024)
- 10 April – Gloria Hunniford, Northern Irish broadcast presenter
- 21 May – Ronan O'Rahilly, Irish-born media entrepreneur (died 2020)
- 11 July – Tommy Vance, born Richard Weston, radio music presenter (died 2005)
- 17 July – Tim Brooke-Taylor, broadcast comedy performer (died 2020)
- September – Dickie Arbiter, royal broadcast presenter
- 13 November – Wally K. Daly, radio scriptwriter (died 2020)

== Deaths ==
- 9 April – Mrs. Patrick Campbell, actress, 72
- 30 October – Hilda Matheson, pioneering radio talks producer, 52 (Graves' disease)

== See also ==
- 1940 in British music
- 1940 in British television
- 1940 in the United Kingdom
- List of British films of 1940
