= Timeline of BBC Radio News =

A timeline of notable events relating to BBC Radio News.

== 1920s ==
- 1922
  - 18 October – The British Broadcasting Company is formed.
  - 14 November – First BBC broadcasts from London (station 2LO) and the opening day saw the broadcast of the very first BBC News bulletin. Wishing to avoid competition, newspaper publishers persuaded the government to ban the BBC from broadcasting news before 7pm and to force it to use wire service copy instead of reporting on its own.
- 1923
  - No events.
- 1924
  - No events.
- 1925
  - No events.
- 1926
  - 4 May – The General strike begins and the BBC broadcasts five news bulletins a day as no newspapers are published.
- 1927
  - No events.
- 1928
  - No events.
- 1929
  - 6 March – Week in Westminster is broadcast for the first time.

== 1930s ==
- 1930
  - No events.
- 1931
  - No events.
- 1932
  - No events.
- 1933
  - No events.
- 1934
  - Following it gaining the right to edit its own bulletins, the BBC creates its own news operation.
- 1935
  - No events.
- 1936
  - No events.
- 1937
  - No events.
- 1938
  - 3 January – The BBC begins broadcasting its first foreign-language radio service, in Arabic.
- 1939
  - Creation of BBC Monitoring.

== 1940s ==
- 1940
  - 11 May – The BBC starts a news service in Hindi.
- 1941
  - No events.
- 1942
  - No events.
- 1943
  - No events.
- 1944
  - No events.
- 1945
  - 9 October – The first edition of Today in Parliament is broadcast.
- 1946
  - BBC Radio bulletins began to be began simulcast on television with a still picture of Big Ben.
- 1947
  - No events.
- 1948
  - 12 October – The first edition of Any Questions? is broadcast, initially broadcast as a six-week fortnightly series, a six-programme series on West of England Home Service.
- 1949
  - September – Any Questions? becomes a weekly programme, still broadcast for the West Country but with a national repeat six days later.

== 1950s ==
- 1950
  - September – Any Questions? starts being broadcast live across the UK on the BBC Light Programme with the repeat on the Home Service.
- 1951
  - No events.
- 1952
  - No events.
- 1953
  - 2 June – The coronation of Queen Elizabeth II in Westminster Abbey is broadcast by the BBC and is broadcast on both the Home Service and on The Light Programme.
- 1954
  - October – Any Answers? a feedback spin-off from Any Questions?, is broadcast on the Home Service for the first time.
- 1955
  - The first edition of From Our Own Correspondent is broadcast.
- 1956
  - No events.
- 1957
  - 28 October – The Today programme is broadcast on the Home Service for the first time. It is intended as an alternative series of "topical talks", broadcast as an alternative to light music. It is broadcast in two 20-minute slots.
- 1958
  - No events.
- 1959
  - No events.

== 1960s ==
- 1960
  - 19 September – A new evening news and comment programme called Ten O’Clock debuts on the Home Service.
- 1961
  - No events.
- 1962
  - No events.
- 1963
  - 31 August – The Today programme becomes part of the BBC's current affairs department and starts to adopt a more newsier format.
- 1964
  - No events.
- 1965
  - 4 October – The World at One is broadcast on the Home Service for the first time.
- 1966
  - No events.
- 1967
  - 17 September – The World This Weekend is broadcast on the Home Service for the first time.
  - 30 September – BBC Radio 1 is launched and a news service of bulletins on the half-hour, as opposed to on the hour is created for the new station. At the same time, the Light Programme, the third network (Network Three / the Third Programme) and the Home Service are renamed Radios 2, 3 and 4 respectively.
- 1968
  - No events.
- 1969
  - 10 July – The BBC publishes a report called "Broadcasting in the Seventies" proposing the reorganisation of programmes on the national networks and replacing regional broadcasting on BBC Radio 4 with BBC Local Radio.

== 1970s ==
- 1970
  - 3 April – For the first time, both airings of Any Questions are broadcast on Radio 4. Previously, the station had only broadcast the Saturday repeat as the Friday night debut broadcast had been on BBC Radio 2.
  - 6 April – The first editions of PM and The World Tonight are broadcast on Radio 4.
  - 10 April – The first broadcast of a new news and current affairs programme Analysis.
- 1971
  - No events.
- 1972
  - No events.
- 1973
  - 10 September – Newsbeat bulletins air on BBC Radio 1 for the first time.
- 1974
  - No events.
- 1975
  - 9 June – Proceedings in the Parliament of the United Kingdom are broadcast on radio for the first time.
- 1976
  - No events.
- 1977
  - 2 May – BBC Radio 4 launches a new breakfast programme Up to the Hour. Consequently, The Today Programme is reduced from a continuous two-hour programme to two 25-minute slots.
  - 1 July – The BBC launches its first ever 30-minute news bulletin when schedule changes to BBC Radio 4 see the 15-minute 6pm bulletin on weekdays doubled in length, a change which sees the bulletin's name changed from the generic News title, used for all news bulletins, to The Six O'Clock News. The weekend 6pm news bulletin remains as a 15-minute broadcast and continues to be listed as News.
  - 2 October – The first edition of personal finance programme Money Box is broadcast.
- 1978
  - 3 April – Permanent radio broadcasts of proceedings in the House of Commons begin. Radio 4 marks the first day with an afternoon of live coverage. The station goes on to broadcast Prime Minister's Questions for the next year.
  - 3 July – After just over a year on air, Up to the Hour is cancelled. Consequently, Today once again becomes a continuous two-hour programme. Also, a new weekday 6am News Briefing is introduced.
- 1979
  - No events.

== 1980s ==
- 1980
  - Summer – Due to the continued expansion of BBC Local Radio, regional news bulletins on Radio 4 end, apart from in the south west as this is now the only part of England still without any BBC local station.
- 1981
  - No events.
- 1982
  - 31 December – The last regional opt-out programming on Radio 4 ends when the final edition of Morning Sou'West is broadcast ahead of the forthcoming launch of BBC Radio Devon and BBC Radio Cornwall.
- 1983
  - 1 February – In Business is broadcast on Radio 4 for the first time.
- 1984
  - No events.
- 1985
  - No events.
- 1986
  - No events.
- 1987
  - 3 January – The Today programme is extended to six days a week when it launches a Saturday edition.
  - 9 February – The 9am and 5pm news bulletins on BBC Radio 3 are replaced by a ten-minute bulletin from the BBC World Service. The bulletins are titled World Service News.
- 1988
  - 15 January – After less than a year, the World Service news bulletins broadcast on Radio 3 are axed.
  - June – After 66 years at Broadcasting House, the BBC Radio News operation moves to BBC Television Centre.
- 1989
  - No events.

== 1990s ==
- 1990
  - 8 January – A new 30-minute news programme News 90 replaces the teatime edition of Newsbeat on Radio 1.
- 1991
  - 17 January–2 March – Radio 4 News FM, the first rolling BBC Radio news service is on air during the first Gulf War. It broadcasts on BBC Radio 4’s FM frequencies with the regular scheduled service continuing on long wave.
  - 16 September – The main BBC Radio 4 service moves from long wave to FM as FM coverage has now been extended to cover almost all of the UK. Opt-outs, which include live news coverage aired outside of the regularly scheduled news programmes, such as live coverage of Prime Ministers Questions, are transferred to long wave.
- 1992
  - late March-7 April – Radio 4 long wave opts out of the main Radio 4 schedule to provide additional coverage of the latest developments in the general election campaign. Called Campaign Report, the coverage runs for around four hours each weekday, as three separate programmes airing mid-morning, early afternoon and early evening.
  - 15 October – The BBC announces plans to launch a continuous news service on BBC Radio 4’s long wave frequency. The date of 5 April 1994 is set as the launch date. The plan would result in Radio 4 broadcasting exclusively on FM.
- 1993
  - There is widespread opposition to the BBC's plans to launch a rolling news service on Radio 4’s long wave frequency, not least due to Radio 4 still not being universally available on FM. The proposals to launch the service on long wave are dropped.
- 1994
  - 10 January – The teatime edition of Newsbeat returns to Radio 1 after four years away. The bulletin airs in its old slot, 5:30pm to 5:45pm.
  - 25 March – The Financial World Tonight is broadcast on Radio 4 for the final time, ahead of its move to the new news and sport station BBC Radio 5 Live.
  - 28 March – At 5am, BBC Radio 5 Live launches. The new 24-hour station replaces the old service's educational and children's programmes with a new rolling news service, whilst retaining the sports programmes from the old Radio 5.
- 1995
  - 27 September – The BBC begins regular Digital Audio Broadcasting, from the Crystal Palace transmitting station. Among the channels offered is a relay of events in Parliament.
- 1996
  - No events.
- 1997
  - 31 August – Regular programming on the BBC's radio and television stations is abandoned to provide ongoing news coverage of the death of Diana, Princess of Wales. Radio 4 airs a special programme from BBC Radio News which is also carried on BBC Radio 2, BBC Radio 3 and BBC Radio 5 Live.
  - 6 September – Live coverage of the funeral of Princess Diana is broadcast on all of the BBC national radio networks, as well as on all BBC Local and National radio stations.
- 1998
  - 22 March – 5 Live's late night news bulletin News Extra and phone-in/talk show After Hours are broadcast for the final time. The next day a new three hour late show called Late Night Live launches and Up All Night is extended to become a four-hour show.
  - 6 April – As part of an extensive shake-up to BBC Radio 4's schedules, the weekday editions of The Today programme are extended by 30 minutes to three hours., a Saturday edition of PM is launched and The Week in Westminster is replaced by a new programme, broadcast on Sunday late evenings called The Westminster Hour.
  - 19 April – A new Sunday morning current affairs programme Broadcasting House launches.
- 1999
  - 3 April – The first edition of a weekend world news programme Global is broadcast on Radio 5 Live.
  - 4 April – Radio 5 Live launches a new "Sunday Service of morning political news".

== 2000s ==
- 2000
  - 14 November – The audio relay on DAB of BBC Parliament closes.
- 2001
  - No events.
- 2002
  - 6 April – The Weekend News debuts on Radio 5 Live. The new programme replaces Global.
  - 29 April – Wake Up to Money which had previously been part of Morning Reports, becomes a programme in its own right and is extended from 15 to 30 minutes. Consequently, Morning Reports now broadcasts for 30 minutes.
  - 2002 sees the launch of four new digital spin-off stations, two of which carry news. BBC Radio 1Xtra habits own specific news service called 1Xtra News and BBC Radio 6 Music broadcasts news bulletins at half past the hour.
- 2003
  - No events.
- 2004
  - No events.
- 2005
  - No events.
- 2006
  - 23 April – The Radio 4 UK Theme is used for the last time, amid controversy over its axing by Radio 4 controller Mark Damazer. It is axed to make way for a 'pacy news briefing'.
- 2007
  - 29 July – Long-running obituary programme Brief Lives is broadcast on Radio 5 Live for the final time.
  - 12 October – iPM is broadcast for the first time. It airs after the Saturday edition of the main programme.
- 2008
  - No events.
- 2009
  - 9 January – The Midday News is broadcast on Radio 5 Live for the final time.

== 2010s ==
- 2010
  - 5 September – Long running evening news programme The Weekend News ends and is replaced by hour-long programmes, including 5 Live Investigates, Pienaar's Politics and a new business show On the Money.
- 2011
  - 7 November – The World at One is extended from 30 to 45 minutes.
- 2012
  - September – Cuts result in BBC Radio 1Xtra losing its news service 1Xtra News. Instead, the station simulcasts the Newsbeat bulletins broadcast on sister station Radio 1 with bespoke bulletins only broadcast during the weekday breakfast show.
- 2013
  - 16 May – Debut of Question Time Extra Time on BBC Radio 5 Live. The programme, including an audio broadcast of the evening's edition of BBC One's Question Time, is presented by Stephen Nolan and John Pienaar, who take a look at the topics raised by Question Time.
- 2014
  - Wake Up to Money on Radio 5 Live is extended from 30 minutes to 45 minutes. Consequently, Morning Reports is shortened from 30 minutes to 15 minutes.
- 2015
  - No events.
- 2016
  - No events.
- 2017
  - No events.
- 2018
  - No events.
- 2019
  - No events.

== 2020s ==
- 2020
  - 29 January – BBC News announces it will shed 450 posts, including roles from BBC Radio 5 Live, as part of £80m worth of savings being made by the BBC.
  - 20 March – Rhod Sharp presents Up All Night on BBC Radio 5 Live for the final time. He had presented the programme since the station's first night on air, more than 25 years earlier.
  - 23 March – In order to prioritise resources during the COVID-19 pandemic, 5 Live suspends overnight programmes between 1am and 5 am and carries the output of BBC Radio London. This continues until early July when 5 Live resumes its overnight programming on weekdays with Dotun Adebayo replacing Rhod Sharp, and the programme no longer being called Up All Night.
  - April – Due to COVID-19, BBC Radio 5 Live's news bulletins are shared with BBC Radio 2. Three minute bulletins are broadcast on the hour, with extended five minute bulletins at breakfast and on weekday early evenings.
  - Having been on air since Radio 5 Live launched, Morning Reports, the 5am news bulletin, is axed as part of cost-cutting measures. The bulletin is replaced by an extended Wake Up to Money, which now broadcasts for the full 5am hour.
  - 10 December – BBC Radio 5 Live's Question Time Extra Time is broadcast for the final time.
- 2021
  - 9 April – All BBC radio networks interrupt normal schedules to announce the death of Prince Philip, Duke of Edinburgh, interrupting programming at 12:07PM. The programme airs on all networks until around 5pm.
- 2022
  - 8 September – Just after Buckingham Palace announces the Death and state funeral of Elizabeth II, all BBC radio stations - local and national - begin broadcasting a special news programme reporting on Her Majesty's death. The programme continues until the following morning, after which stations start to break away from the continuous news coverage.
  - 19 September – All BBC radio stations broadcast live coverage of the state funeral of Queen Elizabeth II.
- 2023
  - No events.
- 2024
  - BBC News launches a 24-hour digital radio station on BBC Sounds, initially for the General Election but it later evolves into a station mixing the flagship news programmes from BBC News Channel, BBC Radio 4, BBC Radio 5 Live and BBC World Service
- 2025
  - No events.
- 2026
  - September – The Saturday edition of Today will be solo anchored.
  - By the end of 2026, The Midnight News on BBC Radio 4 will end. It will be replaced by a short news summary and broadcasts of podcasts.
- 2027
  - April –
    - The World Tonight on BBC Radio 4 will end and be replaced with a simulcast of BBC World Service’s Newshour.
    - Weekend Breakfast on BBC Radio 5 Live will be shortened to a two-hour programme.

== See also ==
- Timeline of BBC Television News
