= 1936 in British radio =

This is a list of events from British radio in 1936.

== Events ==
- 20 January – Death of King George V: The BBC suspends regular programming that evening and announcer Stuart Hibberd reads the medical bulletin issued by the King's physician Lord Dawson of Penn containing the words "The King's life is moving peacefully towards its close."
- 21 January – Death of King George V: German musician Paul Hindemith goes to a BBC office that morning and in six hours writes Trauermusik ("Mourning Music"), for viola and orchestra. It is performed that evening in a live BBC broadcast with Adrian Boult conducting the BBC Symphony Orchestra and the composer as soloist.
- 26 January – Death of King George V: The BBC broadcasts a service to the memory of the King from the Concert Hall in Broadcasting House, London.
- 20 March – The Lisnagarvey transmitting station begins service, broadcasting the BBC Regional Programme for Northern Ireland on a frequency of 977 kHz.
- 27 May – Announcement that the BBC is to construct Broadcasting House, Belfast.
- 1 August – Lieutenant commander Thomas Woodrooffe commentates for the BBC at the opening ceremony of the 1936 Summer Olympics in Berlin. Harold Abrahams also commentates on events.
- 12 October – The Burghead transmitting station begins service, broadcasting the Scottish BBC Regional Programme to the north of Scotland on a frequency of 767 kHz.
- 3 December – Abdication crisis: King Edward VIII proposes to make a BBC broadcast to his people seeking public support for a morganatic marriage. His prime minister, Stanley Baldwin, vetoes the broadcast as unconstitutional. Although coverage of the crisis in the British media is self-censored, Alistair Cooke broadcasts on it extensively to the United States.
- 11 December – In a worldwide radio broadcast, the former King, now Prince Edward, makes a speech from Windsor Castle explaining the reasons for his abdication of the throne earlier in the day, introduced by John Reith in person.

== Births ==
- 2 March – John Tusa, Czech-born broadcast presenter and administrator
- 30 March – John Tydeman, radio drama producer (died 2020)
- 28 April – Robbie Shepherd, Scottish broadcaster (died 2023)
- 12 May – Peter Goodwright, comedic impressionist (died 2020)
- 16 May – Roy Hudd, comedy performer (died 2020)
- 1 August – Laurie Taylor, sociologist and radio presenter
- 20 November – Bill Wallis, character actor (died 2013)
- 12 December – Denise Coffey, actress (died 2022)
- 21 December – Peter Tinniswood, broadcast comedy scriptwriter and novelist (died 2003)
