= 1933 in British radio =

This is a list of events from British radio in 1933.

== Events ==
- 10 March – The BBC holds a memorial concert for its late Director of Music, Percy Pitt, in The Concert Hall of Broadcasting House, London.
- 28 May – Washford transmitting station begins broadcasting the BBC Regional Programme for the West of England.
- 6 August – Benjamin Britten's Phantasy Quartet, Op. 2 (written in 1932 when the composer was an 18-year-old music student) is premiered in a BBC broadcast with Léon Goossens, its dedicatee, as oboist.
- 16 August – The BBC unveils a Compton organ in The Concert Hall of Broadcasting House, London.
- 28 August – For the first time, the BBC broadcasts the description of a wanted criminal suspect – Stanley Hobday who has committed murder in the course of a burglary in West Bromwich. He is recognised from the description near Carlisle and in due course tried and executed.
- 28 October – Broadcast of the earliest surviving BBC location recording, Night on London’s River: Westminster to the Docks.
- BBC executive Colonel Alan Dawnay begins to meet with the head of MI5, Sir Vernon Kell, to trade information informally on potentially subversive staff.
- The BBC acquires a roller skating rink in west London and begins its reconstruction as the Maida Vale Studios.

== Debuts ==
- 18 November – In Town Tonight begins on the BBC National Programme.

== Births ==
- 16 April – Joan Bakewell, broadcaster
- 12 December – Tony Brandon, presenter
