= 1938 in British radio =

This is a list of events from British radio in 1938.

== Events ==
- 3 January – The BBC Empire Service, which began in 1932, transmits its first programme in a foreign language: Arabic.
- 13 January – The BBC makes a radio broadcast of a matinee performance of the musical Me and My Girl live from the Victoria Palace Theatre in London, following the cancellation of a sporting event.
- 30 September – Lieutenant commander Thomas Woodrooffe commentates for BBC radio on Neville Chamberlain's return from signing the Munich Agreement.
- 25 December – The BBC broadcasts He That Should Come, a nativity play by Dorothy L. Sayers.

== Debuts ==
- 5 January – Band Waggon, BBC (1938–1940)

== Births ==
- 6 February – David Rayvern Allen, radio producer and cricket writer (died 2014)
- 17 February – Jo Kendall, radio comedy actress (died 2022)
- 27 June
  - Juliet Ace, Welsh scriptwriter (died 2025)
  - Alan Coren, humourist (died 2007)
- 6 July – Tony Lewis, Welsh cricketer and sports presenter
- 3 August – Terry Wogan, Irish-born broadcaster (died 2016)
- 10 September – "Diddy" David Hamilton, born David Pilditch, broadcaster
- 28 October – David Dimbleby, broadcaster
- 1 November – Malcolm Laycock, radio presenter and producer (died 2009)
- 13 December – Chris Emmett, radio comedy actor
