= 1929 in British radio =

This is a list of events from British radio in 1929.

== Events ==
- April – Peter Eckersley is forced to resign as chief engineer of the BBC because of his affair with Dorothy "Dolly" Clark, estranged wife of BBC programme planner and conductor Edward Clark, and then divorcing his own wife.
- 6 November – Week in Westminster debuts on the BBC Home Service; it will still be running more than 90 years later.
- Tatsfield Receiving Station – formally the BBC Engineering Measurement and Receiving Station – begins operation on the North Downs in Surrey.
- Welsh language radio begins to be broadcast from the BBC's Daventry transmitter.
- A BBC production of Pirandello's The Man with the Flower in His Mouth is probably the first of many radio plays in which John Gielgud will appear.

== Births ==
- 13 January – Colin Morris (died 2018), Methodist minister and religious broadcaster.
- 27 April – Derek Chinnery (died 2015), British radio controller.
- 19 July – Denis Goodwin (suicide 1975), English comedy scriptwriter and radio presenter.
- 25 September – Ronnie Barker (died 2005), English comic actor.
- 25 November – Tim Gudgin (died 2017), English sports results announcer.
- 29 November – Derek Jameson (died 2012), English newspaper editor and broadcaster.
- 28 December – Brian Redhead (died 1994), English radio current affairs presenter.
