= 1937 in British radio =

This is a list of events from British radio in 1937.

== Events ==
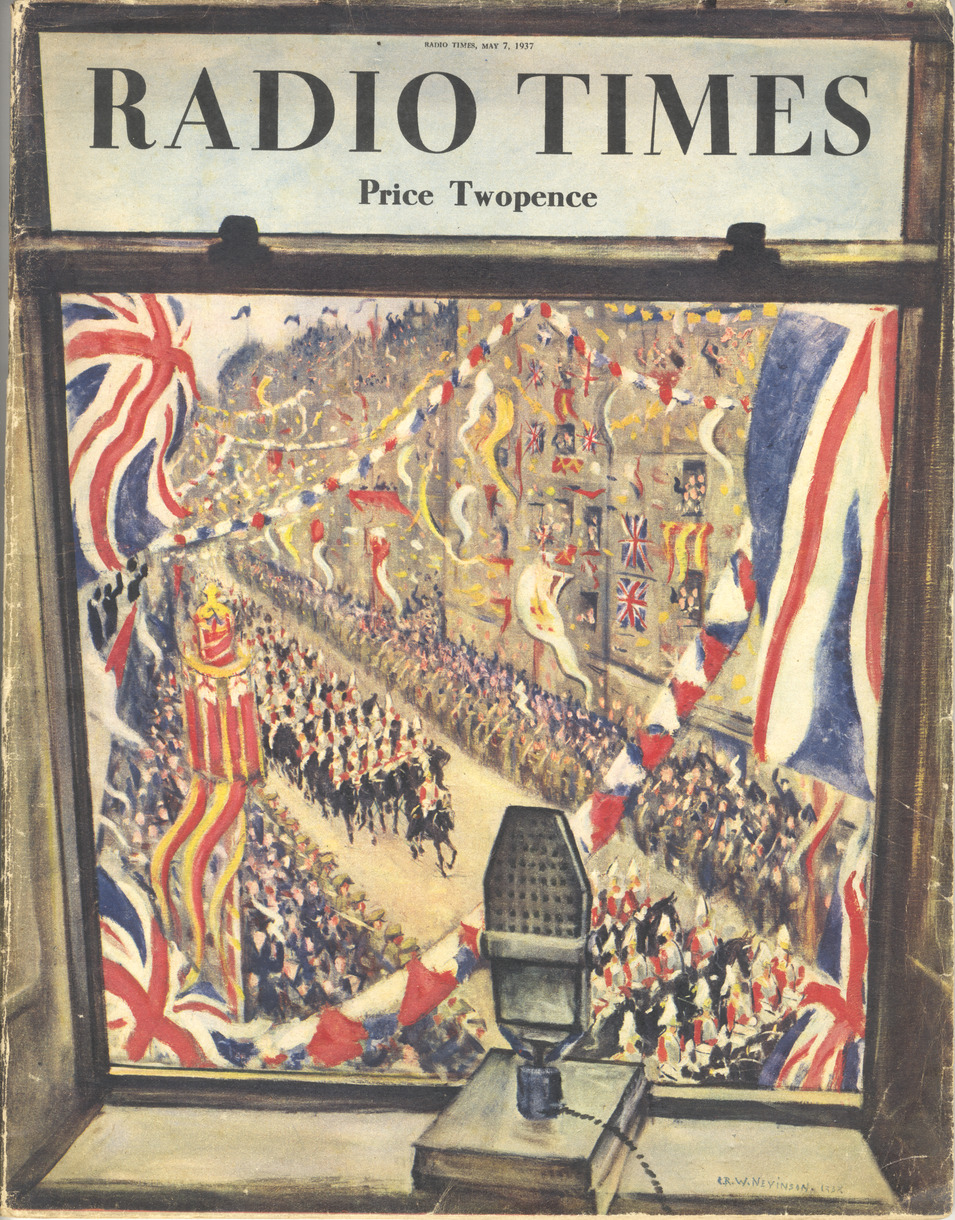
Cover of the 7 May 1937 edition of Radio Times, drawn by C. R. W. Nevinson, marking the first coronation to be broadcast

- January – Lancashire comedian Robb Wilton first appears on BBC radio as Mr Muddlecombe, J.P., continuing through several series until 1948.
- April – The magazine and variety programme Monday Night at Seven launches on the BBC National Programme. In 1939, it becomes Monday Night at Eight.
- 12 May – Coronation of King George VI and Queen Elizabeth at Westminster Abbey in London. The event is covered by BBC outside broadcasts.
- 20 May – Commentating on the illumination of the naval ships at the Coronation Review of the Fleet at Spithead for the BBC, lieutenant commander Thomas Woodrooffe, having enjoyed hospitality on his old ship HMS Nelson, rambles, repeating variations of the phrase "the whole Fleet's lit up", until the broadcast is faded out early.
- 4 July – Following the alteration of frequencies at the BBC's Washford transmitter to enable it to radiate separate regional services for Wales and the West of England, a new Welsh Regional Programme begins, broadcast from Washford on 1050 kHz and Penmon on 804 kHz.
- 19 October – The BBC Regional Programme for the North East and Cumbria (a variant of the North Region) begins transmissions from Stagshaw. It will broadcast a documentary Hadrian's Wall with script by W. H. Auden
- 25 November – The Inter Regional Spelling Competition is broadcast ax part of the BBC's Children's Hour, the origin of the regular quiz Regional Round.
- The BBC National Programme begins broadcasting the police detection series Inspector Hornleigh Investigates, featuring S. J. Warmington in the title role, which proves very popular.

== Births ==
- 16 February – Peter Hobday, broadcast news presenter (died 2020)
- 13 May – Trevor Baylis, inventor of the windup radio (died 2018)
- 20 July – Michael Oliver, radio arts presenter (died 2002)
- 9 November – Roger McGough, poet and radio presenter
- 10 or 30 December – Piers Plowright, radio documentary producer (died 2021)
- 11 December – Stephen Moore, actor (The Hitchhiker's Guide to the Galaxy) (died 2019)
- 17 December – Brian Hayes, Australian-born radio phone-in presenter (died 2025)
