= Julie Enfield Investigates =

- Genre: Radio drama
- Running time: 30–45 minutes
- Country of origin: United Kingdom
- Language: English
- Home station: BBC Radio 4
- Syndicates: BBC Radio 4 Extra
- Starring: Imelda Staunton
- Written by: Nick Fisher
- Directed by: Richard Wortley
- Original release: 11 August 1994 – 25 May 1999
- No. of series: 5
- No. of episodes: 22
- Audio format: Stereo
- Website: www.bbc.co.uk/programmes/b00dn9jp

Julie Enfield Investigates is a series of British radio dramas originally broadcast on BBC Radio 4 between 1994 and 1999. Written by Nick Fisher and starring Imelda Staunton as DSI Enfield, there were five stories: Terminus (1994), The Smithfield Murders (1995), The Net And The Canal (1996), The Leaves Of The Dead (1997) and Murder West One (1999).

The first four runs were serials of four or five 30 minute episodes. Murder West One consists of four self-contained 45-minute cases. As an initial one-off, Terminus didn't carry the 'Julie Enfield Investigates' prefix. Trademarks running through all the stories are a very dark, almost Gothic, sense of horror, and an unusual narrator (in the case of Terminus, the railway station in which the murders take place). The Smithfield Murders begins with an adapted quotation from Oliver Twist: "Filth and fat, and blood and foam. Unwashed unshaven squalid figures move to and fro, among the steam that rises from the reeking bodies, mingling with the fog that seemed to rest upon the chimney tops, hung heavily above." The series is occasionally repeated on BBC Radio 4 Extra.

== Episode lists ==
Series	Episode	Title	First broadcast
Terminus	1	Corpse	11 August 1994
Terminus	2	Busker	18 August 1994
Terminus	3	Playing Games	25 August 1994
Terminus	4	Fury	1 September 1994
Terminus	5	Clue	8 September 1994
The Smithfield Murders	1	Filth And Fat And Blood And Foam	2 November 1995
The Smithfield Murders	2	Blue Bummarees	9 November 1995
The Smithfield Murders	3	Chef's Special	16 November 1995
The Smithfield Murders	4	A Mushroom Diet	23 November 1995
The Smithfield Murders	5	A Passion For Hunting Something	30 November 1995
The Net And The Canal	1	Waking Up To Nessun Dorma	16 May 1996
The Net And The Canal	2	Communicating With The President	23 May 1996
The Net And The Canal	3	Tarantulas In Trojan Horses	30 May 1996
The Net And The Canal	4	Beyond The Firewall	6 June 1996
The Leaves Of The Dead	1	Proverbs And Punctures From Hell	7 August 1997
The Leaves Of The Dead	2	Stacks And Baps And Amulets	14 August 1997
The Leaves Of The Dead	3	Welcome To The Nightmare	21 August 1997
The Leaves Of The Dead	4	Pyramids In The Spider	28 August 1997
Murder West One	1	A Cure For Death	4 May 1999
Murder West One	2	The Art Of The Matter	11 May 1999
Murder West One	3	Five Star Killing	18 May 1999
Murder West One	4	Soho Espresso	25 May 1999
