= 1935 in British radio =

This is a list of events from British radio in 1935.

== Events ==
- 17 February – The Droitwich medium-wave transmitter begins service in England, broadcasting the Midland Regional Programme of the BBC on a frequency of 1013 kHz.
- 8 August – The successful musical show The Air-do Wells appears in the evening schedule and is featured prominently in the Radio Times. The show is produced by Max Kester, with Effie Atherton, accompanied by Jean Colin, Marjorie Stedeford, Brian Lawrance and Ronald Hill.
- 9 August – The Air-do Wells feature again prominently in the schedule and within the Radio Times for the 'listeners weekend' schedule. The show results in Effie Atherton and her crew touring America with the same format and name of the show during 1936.
- 10 December – The first broadcast commentary on a snooker match (Joe Davis v. Horace Lindrum) is given in the BBC Regional Programme.
- The BBC establishes its first Gaelic department.
- Alistair Cooke becomes London Correspondent for U.S. broadcaster NBC, each week recording a 15-minute radio dialogue for American listeners on life in Britain, under the series title of London Letter.

== Births ==
- 23 March – Barry Cryer, comedy scriptwriter and performer (died 2022)
- 15 May – Tony Butler, radio sports presenter in the west midlands (died 2023)
- 26 May – Sheila Steafel, South African-born actress (died 2019)
- 22 June – Walter Love, Northern Irish broadcaster (died 2024)
- 28 July – Simon Dee, born Cyril Henty-Dodd, DJ (died 2009)
- 10 October – Judith Chalmers, broadcast presenter (died 2026)
- 24 October – Mark Tully, India correspondent (died 2026)
- 15 November – Gillian Reynolds, radio critic
- 18 December – Rosemary Leach, actress (died 2017)
