= 1931 in British radio =

This is a list of events from British radio in 1931.

== Events ==
- 10 January–4 April – Behind the Screen, a serial written by members of the Detection Club, is broadcast on the BBC National Programme.
- 17 May – Moorside Edge transmitting station in west Yorkshire begins broadcasting the BBC North Regional Programme on 626 kHz and, from 12 July, the BBC National Programme on 995 kHz.
- 8 September – W. B. Yeats makes his first BBC talk, an introduction to his version of King Oedipus broadcast from its Belfast studio.
- 13 September – Westerglen transmitting station begins broadcasting the BBC Regional Programme for Scotland.
- Autumn – The BBC subsumes all its adult education radio broadcasts under the title The Changing World transmitted in the early evening and lasting around 25 minutes each; presenters will include T. S. Eliot, Harold Nicolson, Julian Huxley and William Beveridge who also author accompanying pamphlets.

== Births ==
- February – Patricia Greene, actress (died 2026)
- 2 February – Les Dawson, comedian (died 1993)
- 18 February – Ned Sherrin, broadcaster and entertainer (died 2007)
- 7 June – Michael Bakewell, radio and television producer and scriptwriter (died 2023)
- 9 December – Ian McIntyre, Scottish journalist and BBC Radio executive (died 2014)
- Edward Taylor, scriptwriter
- Neville Teller, dramatist
