= Collins and Maconie's Hit Parade =

British radio programme (1994–1997)

- Running time: 1 hour
- Country of origin: United Kingdom
- Language: English
- Home station: BBC Radio 1
- Hosted by: Andrew Collins; Stuart Maconie
- Starring: David Quantick
- Produced by: Wise Buddah
- Original release: 19 May 1994 – 8 June 1997
- No. of episodes: 74

Collins and Maconie's Hit Parade is a radio programme that aired from 19 May 1994 to 8 June 1997. There were 74 hour-long episodes and it was broadcast on BBC Radio 1. It starred Andrew Collins and Stuart Maconie, with regular comedy input from fellow NME journalist David Quantick. Produced by BBC Radio 1 DJ Mark Goodier's production company Wise Buddah, it was essentially a revival of the defunct round table format, in which the week's new singles are assessed by two regular guest contributors, predominantly music journalists, such as Caitlin Moran, Adrian Deevoy and John Harris of Q magazine.

The series won a Sony Radio Academy Award in 1995.
