= Comedy Quiz =

BBC radio programme

- Genre: Comedy radio
- Running time: 30 minutes
- Country of origin: United Kingdom
- Language(s): English
- Home station: BBC Radio 4
- Starring: Pam Ayres; Bernard Cribbins; Jim Bowen
- Original release: July 1996 – December 1997
- No. of episodes: 12

Comedy Quiz was a radio programme that aired from July 1996 to December 1997. There were 12 half-hour episodes and it was broadcast on BBC Radio 4. It starred Pam Ayres, Bernard Cribbins, and Jim Bowen.
