= Sam FM =

Sam FM may refer to:

- S.A.M.: Simply About Music, a 24-hour satellite-driven format produced by Westwood One
- Sam FM (South Coast), an adult hits format radio station broadcasting to a stretch of the English South Coast
- Sam FM (Bristol), an English language adult hits format radio station in Bristol, United Kingdom
- Sam FM (Swindon), a local radio station in Swindon, United Kingdom
