= Lesley Saweard =

British actress (born 1934)

- Born: 13 August 1934 (age 91); Grimsby, Lincolnshire, England
- Occupation: Actress
- Years active: 1953–2019
- Known for: The Archers (1953–2019)
- Spouse: Geoffrey Lewis (m. 1956; died 1997)

Lesley J. Saweard (born 13 August 1934) is a British retired actress. She played Christine Barford in the long-running radio soap opera, The Archers, from 1953 until 2019.

== Early life ==
Saweard was born in Grimsby, Lincolnshire to parents William and Hilda (née Kiddle).

== Career ==
Saweard began her career as a teacher, and also appeared in the local amateur dramatic society ‘Playgoers’. In 1953, she began playing the role of Christine Barford (the sister of established character Phil Archer) in BBC Radio 4 soap opera The Archers; she remained on the programme until 2019, apart from a break during the 1960s, between 1962 and returning in 1968.

As of 2024, she was a volunteer for the Lincoln and Lindsey Blind Society, which produces an audio version of the newspapers in and around Louth.

== Personal life ==
Saweard lives in Louth. In 1956, she married Geoffrey Lewis, whom she met on The Archers two years before. They had two children before his death in 1997.
