= 1928 in British radio =

This is a list of events from British radio in 1928.

== Events ==
- 2 January – The BBC broadcasts The Daily Service – a 15-minute act of Christian worship – for the first time, from its Savoy Hill studios in London. The programme will still be broadcast five mornings a week on BBC Radio 4 (LW) until it transfers to Radio 4 Extra in 2024.
- 11 November – Live broadcast of National Service of Remembrance in Whitehall, London, first made by the BBC.
- 24 December – First Festival of Nine Lessons and Carols to be broadcast from King's College Chapel, Cambridge, by BBC Radio.
- The BBC Dance Orchestra is formed under the leadership of Jack Payne.

== Births ==
- 1 June – Bob Monkhouse, comedy writer-performer and television game show host (died 2003)
- 6 June – R. D. Wingfield, novelist and radio dramatist (died 2007)
- 19 June – Barry Took, comedy writer and broadcast presenter (died 2002)
- 2 July – John Timpson, journalist and radio presenter (died 2005)
- 3 July – Edward Greenfield, classical music critic and presenter (died 2015)
- 13 August – John Tidmarsh, journalist and radio presenter (died 2019)
- 17 September – Brian Matthew, disc jockey (died 2017)
- 20 October – Michael O'Donnell, physician, journalist, medical campaigner and broadcaster (died 2019)
