= 1934 in British radio =

This is a list of events from British radio in 1934.

== Events ==
- 23 February
  - Edward Elgar dies, leaving unfinished his Symphony No. 3, commissioned by the BBC Symphony Orchestra, who will premiere its realised version in 1998.
  - Benjamin Britten's unaccompanied choral variations A Boy Was Born, Op. 3 (written in 1932/3 when the composer was a 19-year-old music student) are premiered in a BBC radio concert of contemporary music with Leslie Woodgate conducting the Wireless Chorus and choirboys of St Mark's, North Audley Street, London.
- 6 September – The BBC's most powerful long-wave transmitter, Droitwich Transmitting Station, starts transmitting regularly at 200 kilohertz, following test transmissions from 8 May. From 7 October it takes over from Daventry 5XX as the main station radiating the BBC National Programme.
- 8 October – Alistair Cooke takes over from Oliver Baldwin as the BBC's film critic.
- 29 November – Marriage of Prince George, Duke of Kent, to Princess Marina of Greece and Denmark at Westminster Abbey, the first wedding to be broadcast live on radio.
- 25 December – King George V delivers his third Christmas Message.

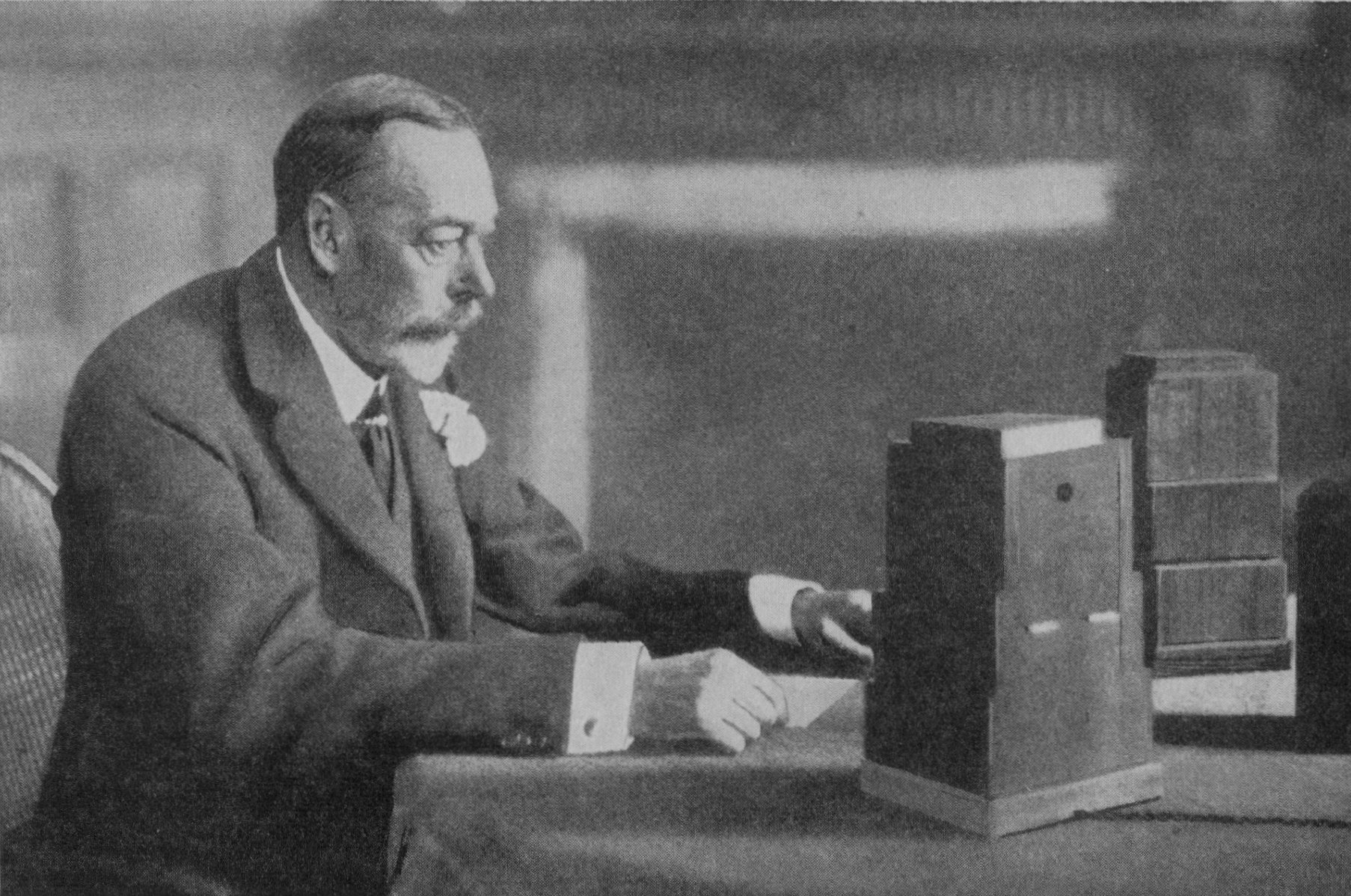
King George V at the microphone, Christmas 1934

- A former London roller skating rink reopens as the BBC's Maida Vale Studios which becomes the home of the BBC Symphony Orchestra.
- The Northern Studio Orchestra is renamed the BBC Northern Orchestra.
- EKCO introduces its distinctive circular bakelite radio cabinets in the United Kingdom.

== Births ==
- 10 January – Sheila Tracy (née Lugg), broadcast presenter, previously swing trombonist (died 2014)
- 4 March – John Dunn, radio presenter (died 2004)
- 5 June – Bryon Butler, radio football correspondent (died 2001)
- 26 August – Gordon Clough, radio journalist (died 1996)
- 18 December – Michael Freedland, journalist, biographer and broadcaster in London (You Don't Have To Be Jewish) (died 2018)

== Deaths ==
- 14 May – Norman Clapham, radio comedian as John Henry, suicide (born 1879)
