= 1926 in British radio =

This is a list of events from British radio in 1926.

== Events ==
- 16 January – A British Broadcasting Company radio play by Ronald Knox about workers' revolution in London causes a panic among those who have not heard the preliminary announcement that it is a satire on broadcasting.
- 4 May – The British Broadcasting Company broadcasts five news bulletins a day as no newspapers are published due to the general strike. John Reith, the BBC's general manager, resists government attempts to take it over during the strike.
- 4 September – Opening of first Radiolympia show of consumer radio apparatus at Olympia, London. The first mains-powered (AC) radio receiver, the Gambrell Baby Grand, is launched.
- 7 October – The first edition of Choral Evensong is relayed by the British Broadcasting Company from Westminster Abbey; it will still be broadcast regularly in its centenary year as the BBC's longest-running outside broadcast programme.
- 31 December – The British Broadcasting Company is dissolved and its assets transferred to the non-commercial and crown-chartered British Broadcasting Corporation.

== Births ==
- 27 January – Fritz Spiegl, Austrian-born flautist, radio broadcaster, writer and theme tune composer (died 2003)
- 22 February – Kenneth Williams, comic actor (died 1988)
- 19 May – David Jacobs, broadcast presenter (died 2013)
- 23 May – Desmond Carrington, disc jockey and actor (died 2017)
- 27 August – Pat Coombs, comic stooge (died 2002)
- 8 September – Ronald Mason, radio drama producer (died 1997)
- 20 October – Austen Kark, managing director, BBC World Service (died in rail accident 2002)
- 31 October – Jimmy Savile, disc jockey, broadcast presenter, philanthropist and serial sex offender (died 2011)
