= RNIB Connect Radio =

Scotland
- Broadcast area: United Kingdom
- Frequencies: FM: 101.0 MHz (in the Glasgow area); Freeview: 730

Programming
- Format: News, music, blind news, talking newspapers, audiobooks, talk radio

Ownership
- Owner: RNIB

History
- First air date: 2003

Links
- Website: Official site

RNIB Connect Radio (previously Insight Radio) is a British radio station that is part of the Royal National Institute of Blind People and was Europe's first radio station for blind and partially sighted listeners. It broadcasts 24 hours a day, 7 days a week online, on 101.0 FM in the Glasgow area and on Freeview channel 730. Live shows make up around half of the station's output, with the overnight schedule being used as a showcase for the best music, features, interviews and articles from the past few days. Most of the presenters are blind or visually impaired. From 2007 until early 2016, it was known as Insight Radio.

Although the station's main studios are based in Scotland, the station broadcasts to people across the UK and around the world, with many listeners in the United States and Canada. Other studios are in Grimaldi House in London.

== History ==
The radio station started as an online service called VIP on Air in November 2003, broadcasting for 2 hours a day, and later extending this to a 4-hour broadcast day. In 2007 the service was completely re-vamped, renamed and re-launched as Insight Radio.

The name VIP on Air was changed for a number of reasons. VIP in this context stands for Visually Impaired People, but could be easily misunderstood. Also, as the station was broadcasting only on the internet at the time, it wasn't actually 'on air' at all.

After broadcasting as Insight Radio for a number of years, the station became RNIB Connect Radio in 2016.

=== Big Brother ===
In 2008, a former member of staff from Insight Radio, Michael Hughes, became a contestant on the TV show Big Brother. He finished in second place.

== Awards ==
In 2024 RNIB Connect Radio was named Community Station of The Year when the station won the Gold Award at the Radio Academy Arias.

In 2007, The Insight Show (which later became The Daily Lunch) won the Silver Sony Award for the Internet Programme Award.

== See also ==
- In Touch – a programme on BBC Radio 4 for people who are blind or partially sighted
- RPH Australia – a network of similar radio services in Australia
- ACB Radio – a similar American service
- Radio reading service – a similar New Zealand service
