= Alan's Big One =

Short-lived British radio series

- Running time: 1 hour
- Country of origin: United Kingdom
- Language: English
- Home station: BBC Radio 1
- Hosted by: Alan Davies
- Original release: 1994 – 1995
- No. of episodes: 13

Alan's Big One FM is a short radio series that ran from 1994 to 1995. There were 13 hour-long episodes and it was broadcast on BBC Radio 1. The host was Alan Davies.
