= 1932 in British radio =

The following is a list of events from British radio in 1932.

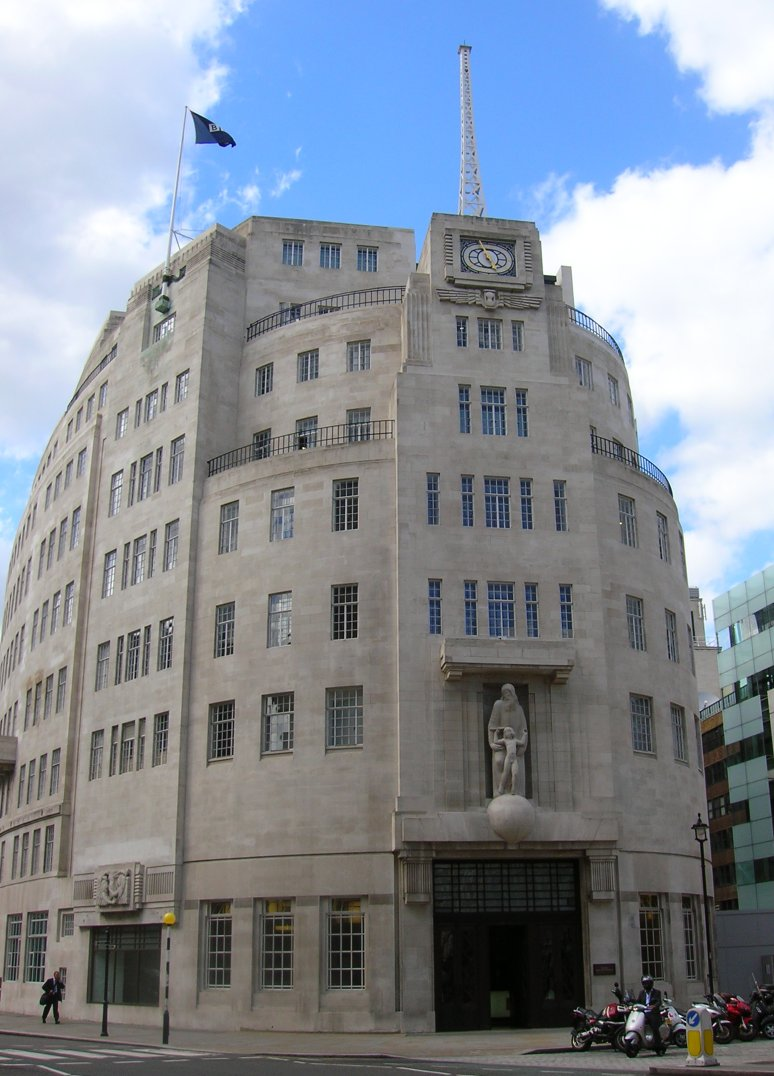
Broadcasting House

== Events ==
- 15 March
  - First BBC radio broadcast from the new Broadcasting House in London; all programmes transfer from 15 May.
  - The BBC Dance Orchestra first broadcasts under the direction of Henry Hall.
- May – Radio Luxembourg begins high-powered longwave test transmissions aimed directly at the British Isles (which prove, inadvertently, to be the first radio modification of the ionosphere).
- 15 October – First performance before an audience in The Concert Hall of Broadcasting House.
- 17 October – Novelist J. B. Priestley delivers a radio talk "To a Highbrow" (urging listeners to be "broadbrow"), part of an attack on Virginia Woolf and her circle.
- 30 November – The BBC begins a series of radio broadcasts to mark the 75th birthday of composer Sir Edward Elgar.
- 19 December – The BBC Empire Service, later known as the BBC World Service, begins broadcasting using a shortwave radio facility at its Daventry transmitting station.
- 25 December – Inaugural Royal Christmas Message delivered by King George V from Sandringham House; scheduled for approximately 3:05pm; the text has been written by Rudyard Kipling.

== Births ==
- 19 January – George MacBeth, Scottish-born poet and radio poetry producer (died 1992)
- 28 January – Norman de Mesquita, sports commentator (died 2013)
- 25 April – Shirley Gee, radio dramatist (died 2016)
- 4 September – Dinsdale Landen, actor (died 2003)
- 17 October – David Willey, BBC foreign correspondent (died 2026)

== Deaths ==
- 23 November – Percy Pitt, BBC Director of Music (born 1869)
