= Week in Westminster =

BBC Radio 4 programme

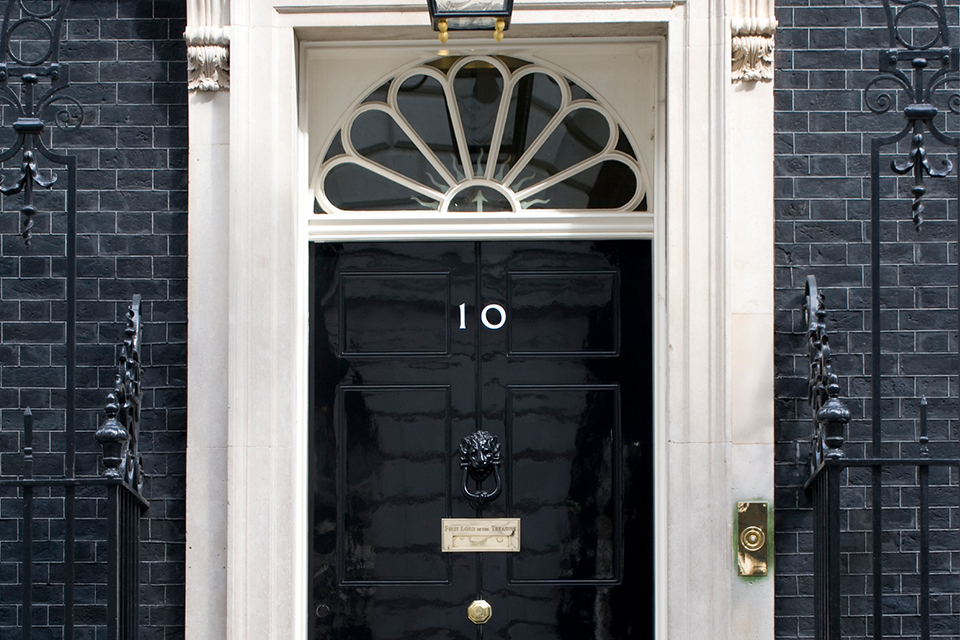
10 Downing Street, residence of the Prime Minister

The Week in Westminster is a weekly political radio programme, which is broadcast on Saturdays on BBC Radio 4.

It is the fifth longest-running radio broadcast on British radio, between Daily Service (2 January 1928) and Sunday Half Hour (14 July 1940).

== History ==
=== Women in parliament ===
It was first broadcast on 6 November 1929 on the BBC Home Service. Ramsay MacDonald was the prime minister at the time, after the 1929 General Election on 30 May 1929, when the Labour Party had won the most seats (287) in a general election for the first time. The 1929 general election was known as the Flapper Election because it was the first general election in which women over 21 had been allowed to vote. The Representation of the People (Equal Franchise) Act 1928 had been given Royal Assent on 2 July 1928. Men were also allowed to vote when over the age of 21. Only in the Representation of the People Act 1969 would the age be lowered to 18, but people aged under 21 could not stand as MPs.

Women's broadcasting on the Home Service had been initiated by Hilda Matheson OBE (7 June 1888- 30 October 1940). The programme was at 10:45 am on each Wednesday and first known as The Week in Parliament.

As parliament, and its affairs, was thought to be a new institution to most women by the patriarchal-run BBC, it was decided to create a radio programme whereby female MPs would broadcast short talks to the nation's women, to help them familiarise the parliamentary processes and significances. The first presenter was Scottish. Margaret Bondfield was the first British female cabinet minister, when she became Minister of Labour in June 1929. Lord Reith approved of the programme, and wrote of it, "it is chiefly for the benefit of housewives but covering also a large mixed audience of shift-workers, unemployed, invalids, etcetera".

In 1931, male MPs were also given a slot on the programme to expound their opinions. The programme had become more well known by then. In the late 1930s the programme's producer was Guy Burgess, later found to be a Soviet spy.

=== World War II ===
During the Second World War, the programme had an (enforced) eighteen-month break.

=== Wider coverage ===
Margaret Thatcher gave the broadcast on 10 April 1965. By the late 1960s presenters other than actual MPs, such as political journalists, were given slots. In the late 1990s, the Controller of Radio 4 moved the programme to late Thursday nights. A protest ensued and it was restored to Saturday mornings.

== Content ==
The programme today is not presented by actual MPs, as it was before the 1960s, but by political journalists. They interview a small group of backbench MPs in the studio, interspersed with other features. It is broadcast for 30 minutes on Saturday mornings, usually at 11:00 am, and is available as a podcast. It is not broadcast when parliament is in recess.

Audio broadcasting from the Houses of Parliament began in 1976. Television entered the House of Lords in 1985, and the House of Commons in 1989.

=== Regular hosts ===
- Isabel Hardman
- Anushka Asthana
- Steve Richards

== See also ==
- Category:British political journalists
- Politics Live, on BBC Two at weekday lunchtimes, with a relatively similar format.
- The Westminster Hour, on Sunday nights on Radio 4, with a regular in-house presenter
- Yesterday in Parliament, broadcast since 1947
- Political podcast
