= Kaleidoscope (British radio series) =

BBC Radio 4 arts programme

Kaleidoscope was a BBC Radio 4 arts programme which ran for 25 years from 1973. It ended with the major schedule changes that occurred in April 1998, when it was replaced by Front Row.

== History ==
When originally launched on 2 April 1973, as part of a re-organisation of the Radio 4 schedules under network controller Tony Whitby, it was intended to be a nightly review of what was new in theatre, books, cinema, painting, architecture, and scientific advance, but the programme had dropped its science coverage by the beginning of May 1974.

=== In the schedules ===
Kaleidoscope started out being broadcast between 22.30 and 23.00 each weekday night (allowing it to include live reviews of first nights). Early presenters were alternately Kenneth Robinson and Brian J. Ford. The programme subsequently ran in a variety of slots over the years, including mid-evening, in the lead up to the 22.00 news, and in mid-afternoon (the latter starting out as a repeat of the previous night's edition). By the end of its run, on 3 April 1998, it was being broadcast between 16.05 and 16.45 each weekday afternoon, with a revised 30-minute repeat at 21.30.

Until 3 May 1980 an additional Saturday edition at 17.00 (22.15 from 29 September 1979) reprised the week's highlights, and then – following a gap of more than 10 years – the programme returned to Saturdays from the start of 1991 (initially at 20.45, then at 19.20 from 14 September), but with the difference that each edition was now a "special" devoted to a single theme.

== Presenters ==
Presenters included:

- Paul Allen
- Michael Billington
- Quentin Cooper
- Ronald Harwood
- Waldemar Januszczak
- Tim Marlow
- Sheridan Morley
- Michael Oliver
- Nigel Rees
- Robert Dawson Scott
- Brian Sibley
- Paul Vaughan
- Lynne Walker
- Natalie Wheen
