= Thomas Woodrooffe =

British naval officer, broadcaster and writer

Thomas Borries Ralph Woodrooffe (24 January 1899 – 25 March 1978) was a British naval officer, broadcaster and writer. He was born in Adelaide, Cape Province, South Africa, to George Borries Woodrooffe (1868–1923) and Elizabeth McFarlan "Bessie" Jameson (1872?–1941). He joined the Royal Navy in 1917 and served on HMS Resolution during the last year of World War I. He rose to the rank of Lieutenant-Commander and left the Navy in 1933.

After his retirement he became a commentator for BBC Radio. He was one of its main commentators during the 1930s, covering amongst many other events the opening ceremony of the 1936 Summer Olympics and Neville Chamberlain's return from Munich in 1938.

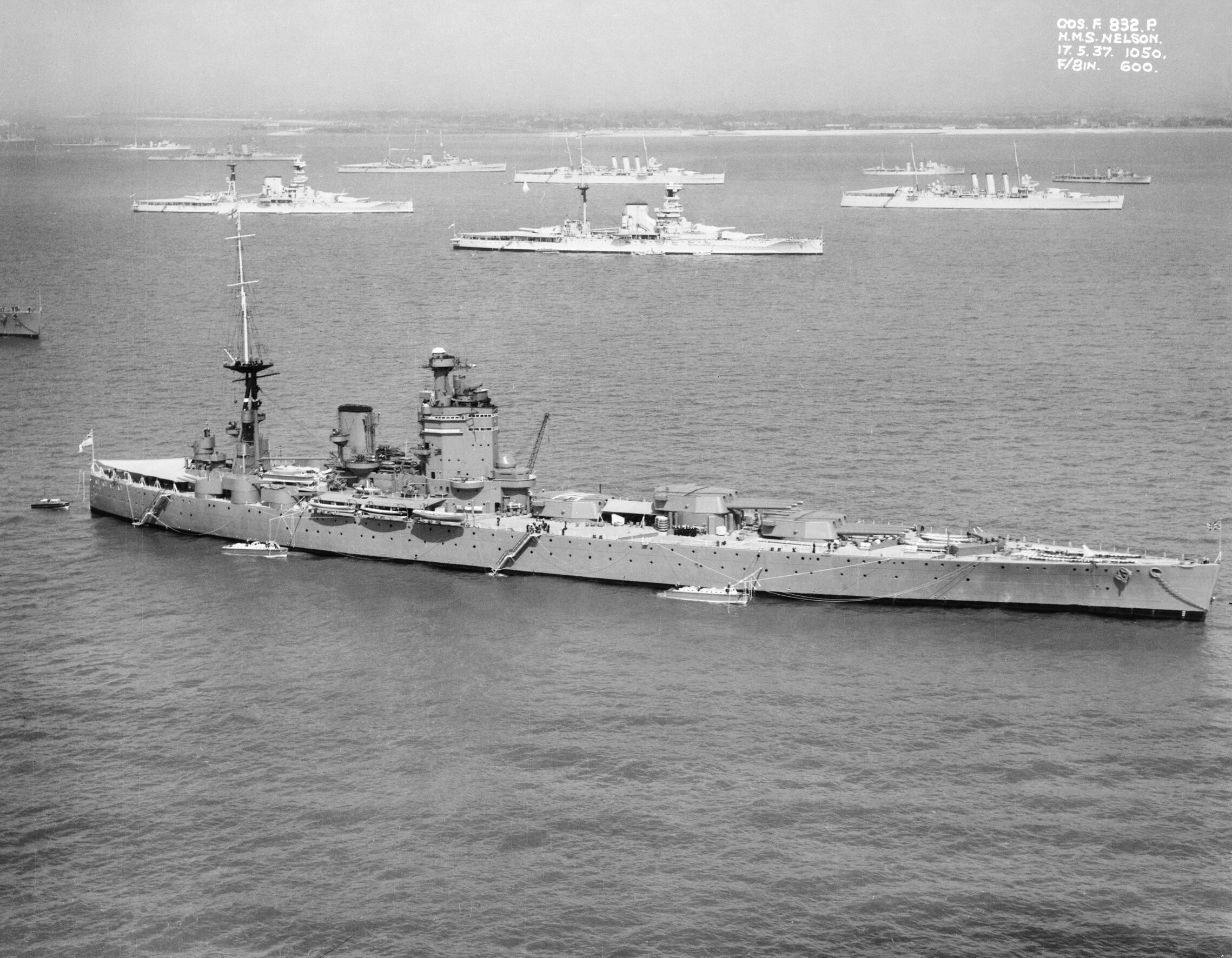
HMS Nelson off Spithead for the 1937 Coronation Fleet Review

In 1937, he commentated on the Coronation Review of the Fleet at Spithead from his old ship the battleship HMS Nelson. He had met some of his former colleagues before the broadcast for a drink, and was inebriated while giving his commentary. He repeatedly said "the fleet's lit up", and at one point he told listeners "I'm sorry, I was telling some people to shut up talking." His incoherence was such that he was taken off air after a few minutes and suspended for a week by BBC Director-General Sir John Reith. The BBC later said that he was "tired and emotional".

A year later his phrase "the fleet's lit up" was used as the title of a musical comedy, and in 1940 Hubert Gregg wrote the song "I'm Going To Get Lit Up When The Lights Go up in London". Parts of Woodrooffe's commentary were used by the British rock band Public Service Broadcasting in their track Lit Up.

Woodrooffe continued to work for the BBC, and in 1938 he was the main commentator at the FA Cup Final between Preston North End and Huddersfield Town, the first to be televised. After 29 minutes of extra time it was still 0–0 and Woodrooffe said "If there's a goal scored now, I'll eat my hat." Seconds later Preston was awarded a penalty from which George Mutch scored. Woodrooffe kept his promise, appearing on the BBC television programme Picture Page the following week and eating a hat-shaped cake.

Woodrooffe rejoined the Admiralty in September 1939. In 1940, he served briefly as Commanding Officer of the light cruiser HMS Coventry. He spent the rest of World War II in the Press Division of the Admiralty.

Woodrooffe also wrote books on naval history, including River of Golden Sand (1936), Best Stories of the Navy (1941) and Vantage at Sea: England's Emergence as An Oceanic Power (1958). He married Ida Helen Duncan (1900–1981) in 1927. He died in Kensington at the age of 79.
