= From Our Own Correspondent =

- Genre: Current affairs
- Running time: 23–30 minutes
- Country of origin: United Kingdom
- Language: English
- Home station: BBC World Service; BBC Radio 4
- Hosted by: Kate Adie (BBC Radio 4); Pascale Harter (BBC World Service)
- Produced by: Andrea Protheroe
- Edited by: Tony Grant
- Original release: 1955 – Present
- Website: World Service edition Radio 4 edition
- Podcast: BBC podcast

From Our Own Correspondent is a weekly BBC radio programme in which BBC foreign correspondents deliver a sequence of short talks reflecting on current events and topical themes in the countries outside the UK in which they are based. The programme offers the BBC's correspondents around the world a chance to give a personal account of events from the epoch-making to the inconsequential.

From Our Own Correspondent is broadcast in two editions – one on the BBC World Service and one on BBC Radio 4 – and the programme was one of the first to be made available by the BBC as a podcast.

The programme was first commissioned in 1955. A book entitled From Our Own Correspondent: A celebration of 50 years of the BBC Radio Programme was published in 2005 with a selection of the show's reports for each continent. A related series, From Our Home Correspondent, was presented by Mishal Husain and focussed on stories by British domestic correspondents and was broadcast between 2016 and 2020.

== Presenters ==
The programme was, for many years, presented by the Radio 4 and World Service announcers as part of their duties, but is now fronted by former BBC correspondents:

=== Current ===
| Years | Presenter | Current role |
|---|---|---|
| 1998–present | Kate Adie | BBC Radio 4 presenter |
| 2012–present | Pascale Harter | BBC World Service presenter |

=== Past ===
- Alan Johnston (January 2008 – November 2011; BBC World Service)
