= Billy Cotton Band Show =

British radio programme

The Billy Cotton Band Show is a Sunday lunchtime radio programme which was broadcast on the BBC Light Programme from 1949 until 1968.

The band leader, Billy Cotton, was a Cockney character who started each show with the cry "Wakey-Wake-aaaay!", followed by the band's signature tune "Somebody Stole My Gal".

The show transferred to BBC Television in 1956, usually on Saturday evenings at 7.00 pm. It ran, under various names, until 1968.

Regular entertainers included Alan Breeze, Kathie Kay, and the pianist Russ Conway. Pianist Mrs Mills made her first television appearance on the show. An additional regular act was the Leslie Roberts Silhouettes, recruited to the line-up before the television series began

Terry Jones and Michael Palin, both later to become members of Monty Python, wrote jokes for the show.

== Links ==
- The Billy Cotton Band Show at IMDb
