= Have a Go =

BBC radio quiz show (1946–1967)

The show featured on the cover of the Radio Times on 1 December 1950 - Wilfred Pickles with a contestant

Have a Go was a BBC Radio show that ran from 1946 to 1967. Hosted by Wilfred Pickles and co-presented with his wife Mabel (née Myerscough), it involved the couple travelling to venues around the UK and speaking to members of the public, who were then invited to answer quiz questions in the hope of winning a small amount of money. It was the first quiz show in Britain to offer such a prize.

== Format ==
The show toured Britain performing in towns and villages in local halls or canteens. It was accompanied by a pianist on stage who provided musical links and catch tunes. Members of the audience would join in to sing the opening song. Volunteers would step up and be interviewed by Wilfred Pickles about their lives before he asked them a general knowledge question. They would receive a prize whether they answered right or wrong, but more if they were right. The question was carried forward to the next contestant if it was answered incorrectly.

Pickles' presentation style resulted in catchphrases such as "How do, how are yer?", "Are yer courting?", "What's on the table, Mabel?" and "Give him the money, Mabel" or "Give him the money, Barney". There would also often be items of local produce awarded in addition to the money, hence the catchphrase "What's on the table, Mabel?"

The programme's popularity was such that at one time it attracted an estimated 20 million listeners weekly.

For six years the pianist for the programme was Violet Carson.

The theme song (composition and lyrics by Jack Jordan) went:

"Have a go, Joe, come on and have a go, You can't lose owt, it costs you nowt, To make yourself some dough. So hurry up and join us, don't be shy and don't be slow. Come on Joe, have a go!"
