= Housewives' Choice =

Housewive's Choice
- Genre: Record requests
- Running time: 9:00 am–9:55 am
- Country of origin: United Kingdom
- Language(s): English
- Home station: BBC Light Programme
- Hosted by: Various guest presenters each week
- Created by: Norman Collins
- Original release: 4 January 1946 – 29 September 1967
- Opening theme: "In Party Mood" by Jack Strachey

Housewives' Choice was a BBC Radio record request programme, broadcast every weekday morning between 1946 and 1967 on the BBC Light Programme. It played a wide range of mostly popular music intended to appeal to housewives at home during the day. Like many other BBC radio shows in the era of very limited broadcasting competition, it achieved huge audiences, and is closely identified with the time in the public mind.

== Theme ==
The distinctive theme music was "In Party Mood" by Jack Strachey. This music, much like "Puffin' Billy", the theme to Junior Choice, has latterly been used frequently in other media as a signifier for 1950s Middle England, for example in a number of TV adverts and in the Comic Strip's parodies of the Famous Five, Five Go Mad in Dorset and Five Go Mad on Mescalin.

== Conception and presentation ==
The programme was conceived by the Controller of the Light Programme, Norman Collins, who had heard a similar programme on Swedish radio.

The show had a different presenter − often referred to at the time as a compere − every week who was either a BBC staff announcer, contracted broadcaster, actor, comedian, singer, or musician. Amongst the more than 250, mostly male, presenters were a number who made repeated appearances including Bryan Michie, Roy Rich, Godfrey Winn, Robert McDermott, Richard Murdoch, John Slater, Gary Miller, Kenneth Horne, Sam Costa, Desmond Carrington and David Jacobs. One of the most popular was George Elrick, who sang his own lyrics over the theme music, beginning with "Dooodle-dum-de-doodle-dum" and ending with "I'll be with you all again tomorrow morning", or "I'll be in bed tomorrow morning" on Fridays.

== Cancellation and legacy ==
The programme ended when the Light Programme was replaced by BBC Radio 1 and BBC Radio 2 in 1967. Its short-lived successor, Family Choice, was broadcast on both Radios 1 and 2, but by September 1969, had also ended.

In 1982, a radio series called When Housewives Had The Choice?, with Russell Davies, Maureen Lipman and Julie Covington, looked back over the Housewives' Choice years, and a spin-off album of the most frequently requested tunes was released. This 1980s radio show also produced a full set of lyrics to the original housewives choice theme tune sung by Julie Covington. The lyrics contrasted the austere life of a housewife in the 1940s to that of the affluent 1980s.

There have been two one-off revivals of the programme on BBC Radio 2, in 1990 with George Elrick and in 1995 with Roy Hudd.
