= Music While You Work =

Radio programme

- Genre: Popular music; Light music
- Running time: 30 mins (10:30 am – 11:00 am)
- Country of origin: United Kingdom
- Language: English
- Home station: BBC Home Service (1940–1964); BBC Forces Programme (1940–1944); BBC General Forces Programme (1944–1945); BBC Light Programme (1945–1967)
- Original release: 23 June 1940 – 29 September 1967
- Opening theme: "Calling All Workers" by Eric Coates

Music While You Work was a daytime radio programme of continuous live popular music broadcast in the United Kingdom twice daily on workdays from 23 June 1940 until 29 September 1967 by the BBC. Initially, the morning edition was generally broadcast on the BBC Home Service at 10:30am, with the afternoon edition at 3pm on the Forces/General Forces Programme - and after the war on the BBC Light Programme. Between August 1942 and July 1945, a third edition was broadcast at 10:30pm for night-shift workers. From October 1940 a theme tune, Calling All Workers by Eric Coates, was adopted to begin and end each episode, arranged by the performers of the day.

The programme began in World War II with the idea that playing non-stop popular/light music at an even tempo would help factory workers become more productive. It was also a key part of the BBC's strategy of mobilizing popular music in support of Britain's war effort, with the aim of encouraging "ordinary British people [to] unite in the common cause of victory".

Music While You Work originally consisted of live music (light orchestras, dance bands, brass and military bands and small instrumental ensembles). Many combinations made hundreds of appearances, notably Pasquale Troise and his Banjoliers, George Scott-Wood and His Music, Cecil Norman and the Rhythm Players, Bernard Monshin and his Rio Tango Band, Anton and his Orchestra, Bill Savill and his Orchestra and Jack White and his Band.

Although the programme became very popular with domestic audiences and later with motorists, it was aimed first and foremost at the factories, and strict rules were applied: predominantly familiar pieces, nothing lethargic, consistent volume, avoidance of overloud drumming (which could sound like gunfire), and generally cheerful programmes to which workers could whistle or sing. The first edition featured Dudley Beaven playing the BBC Theatre Organ,, but organs were dropped two years later because their less abrasive sound could not be heard clearly above factory noise and over the specially installed Tannoy speakers. Jazz was discouraged as, by its very nature, it often deviates from the melody, which had to be clear at all times. The song "Deep in the Heart of Texas" was banned from the show, because of the potential danger of production line workers taking their hands away from their work or banging their spanners on the machinery to perform the four hand-claps in the chorus.

In 1963, in order to make studios more available during the day, it was decided that the shows would be pre-recorded (often in the evening or on Sundays). Music While You Work ended in 1967 when the BBC Light Programme transformed into BBC Radio 2. It was revived for a week to mark the BBC's 60th anniversary in October 1982 and then as a regular part of Radio 2 from January 1983 to January 1984. There were two short revivals in 1990 and 1991, and a final one-off programme in 1995. The music also featured in the background of the 'Harry Enfield & Chums/Harry Enfield's Television Programme' sketch shows during the 'Mr. Cholmondley-Warner' skits, themselves a parody of 1940s culture and attitudes. The concept of the programme was evoked during BBC Radio 3's "Light Fantastic" 2011 season with a live broadcast of light music from a factory in Irlam performed by the BBC Philharmonic, reminiscent of Music While You Work and Workers' Playtime. This one-off programme differed from the original series as it was staged before an audience and the items were announced.

A radio documentary on the programme, The Music Factory, was first broadcast in September 2002. Serenade Radio broadcasts historic reruns of the programme at 9.30am on weekdays.

== See also ==
- Workers' Playtime
- Muzak
