= Book at Bedtime =

BBC Radio 4 programme

Book at Bedtime (A Book at Bedtime until 9 July 1993) is a long-running radio programme that is broadcast on BBC Radio 4 each weekday evening between 22:45 and 23:00.

The programme presents readings of fiction, including modern classics, new works by leading writers, and literature from around the world. Books are abridged and typically serialised over one or two weeks and occasionally three, usually read by well-known actors. Occasionally, from a collection of short stories, five stories from the book will be selected and one broadcast each evening.

== History ==
The series began on the BBC Light Programme on 31 January 1949, billed for the first week only as "Late-Night Serial", with the first instalment of a 15-part reading of the John Buchan novel The Three Hostages, read by Arthur Bush.

There was a break after 29 March 1957, but the programme returned under its old title, now on the BBC Home Service, on 2 April 1962; the Home Service had in fact been broadcasting weekday evening 15-minute readings since 19 September 1960, but not under the Book at Bedtime heading.

== See also ==
- Book of the Week
