= In Town Tonight =

BBC radio programme

- Running time: 30 minutes (7:30 pm – 8:00 pm)
- Country of origin: United Kingdom
- Language(s): English
- Home station: BBC National Programme; BBC Home Service
- Original release: 18 November 1933 – 17 September 1960
- Audio format: Mono
- Opening theme: "Knightsbridge March" by Eric Coates

In Town Tonight is a BBC radio programme that was broadcast on Saturday evening from 1933 to 1960 (except for a period of 26 weeks in 1937 when The BBC presents the ABC was broadcast instead). It was an early example of a chat show, originally presented by Eric Maschwitz.

Its theme music was "Knightsbridge March" by Eric Coates. Its introductory sequence had a voice crying "Stop" to interrupt the sound of busy central London, before an announcer said "Once more we stop the mighty roar of London's traffic...." At the end of the programme the voice would say: "Carry on, London."

A series of outside broadcast spots were included in the 1940s: "Standing on the Corner" with Michael Standing, then "Man on the Street" with Stewart MacPherson and Harold Warrender, and "On the Job" with John Ellison, later Brian Johnston; Johnston continued in the segment "Let's Go Somewhere" from 1948 to 1952. As part of this he stayed alone in the Chamber of Horrors, rode a circus horse, lay under a passing train, was hauled out of the sea by a helicopter and was attacked by a police dog.

The 1000th episode, on 6 August 1960, included appearances by Errol Flynn, Gary Cooper, Jane Russell, and Doris Day: this was a few weeks before it ended. Towards the end of its run the programme was simultaneously broadcast on BBC Television, presented by John Ellison. Antony Bilbow and Nan Winton were the last presenters of the programme and carried on in its successor which began after a missing week. After its demise the programme was replaced by In Town Today, which was broadcast at lunchtime and ran until 1965.

== Sources ==
- Donovan, Paul (1992), The Radio Companion. London: Grafton, pp. 133–34
