= Letter from America =

Weekly radio programme on the BBC

Letter from America was a weekly fifteen-minute spoken word radio series broadcast on BBC Radio 4 and its predecessor, the Home Service, and around the world through the BBC World Service. From its first edition to its last, it was presented by Alistair Cooke, who would speak of a topical issue in the US, tying together different strands of observation and anecdote and often ending on a humorous or poignant note. The series ran from 24 March 1946 to 20 February 2004, making it the longest-running speech radio programme hosted by one individual.

== History ==
Letter from America had its origin in London Letter, a 15-minute talk for American listeners on life in Britain that Alistair Cooke recorded during the 1930s while working as London correspondent for NBC. London Letter came to an end when Cooke emigrated to America in 1937, but it was not long before he suggested to the BBC the idea of continuing the idea in reverse. A prototype, Mainly About Manhattan, was broadcast intermittently from October 1938, but the idea was shelved with the outbreak of World War II in September 1939.

The first American Letter was broadcast on 24 March 1946, initially confirmed for only 13 instalments, after Cooke had given a one-off talk under that title in the series Sunday Newsletter on 25 November 1945. The change of title to Letter from America came on 30 September 1949. The series lasted for 2,869 broadcasts over nearly 58 years and gathered an enormous audience, being broadcast not only in Britain and in many other Commonwealth countries, but throughout the world by the BBC World Service.

On 2 March 2004, at the age of 95, following advice from his doctors, Cooke announced his retirement from Letter from America; he died less than a month later, on 30 March 2004, at his home in New York City. Five years later, BBC Radio 4 premiered Americana, touted as the successor to Letter from America, however it lasted less than three years, ending in the autumn of 2011.

== Availability ==
A compilation of the programme's transcripts was published in 2004. In 2012 the BBC made over 900 full episodes freely available online. The BBC also broadcast a documentary by Alvin Hall about Letter from America.

In March 2014, the BBC announced it had recovered over 650 lost editions of the programme, recorded by two listeners, Roy Whittaker in Cornwall and David Henderson in Warwickshire.

In 2024 University of Warwick professor Tim Lockley discovered three more complete and two partial episodes dating from the late 1940s and the early 1950s.
