= Down Your Way =

- Country of origin: United Kingdom
- Language: English
- Home station: BBC Home Service; BBC Radio 4
- Hosted by: Stewart MacPherson; Richard Dimbleby; Franklin Engelmann; Brian Johnston
- Original release: 29 December 1946 – 13 December 1992
- Opening theme: "Horseguards, Whitehall" by Haydn Wood

Down Your Way was a BBC radio series which ran from 29 December 1946 to 1992, originally on the Home Service, later on BBC Radio 4, usually being broadcast on Sunday afternoons. It visited towns and villages around the United Kingdom, spoke to residents and played their choice of music.

== History ==
=== Listener-centred ===
Down Your Way was initially hosted by Stewart MacPherson, who presented the first twelve shows, but in 1947, after brief hosting spells by Lionel Gamlin and Wynford Vaughan-Thomas, Richard Dimbleby took over its presentation, continuing until 1955. Mary Fisher, the first female mayor of Harrogate, was interviewed by Dimbleby on the show in 1949. Franklin Engelmann presented the show until his death in 1972, when Brian Johnston took over until 1987. In 1975, despite then being the second most popular programme on radio, it was taken off the air as an 'economy measure'. It was subsequently reinstated, after a storm of popular protest.

=== Celebrity-centred ===
From 1987 until its demise in 1992 Down Your Way had a different celebrity host every week, who would visit a place of significance in their own lives – effectively turning it into 'Down My Way' and blending it into the then-emerging celebrity culture.

== Presentation and response ==
Down Your Way's well-remembered signature tune was "Horse Guards, Whitehall" by Haydn Wood.

In the early 1980s the show was satirised on The Kenny Everett Television Show as "Up Your Way", a saccharine television version presented by "Verity Treacle". In 1984, it was parodied by Radio Active as "Round Your Parts".
