= 2013 in British radio =

This is a list of events in British radio during 2013.

== Events ==
=== January ===
- 1 January – Adele's recording of "Make You Feel My Love" is named the UK's number one song of all time in Heart's first ever Hall of Fame Top 500.
- 3 January
  - It is reported that Gaydar Radio owner QSoft Consulting will leave the radio business and hand its DAB licences to Manchester community station Gaydio.
  - Breakdown service Green Flag agrees a six-figure deal to sponsor Absolute Radio's traffic and travel bulletins for six months.
- 5 January
  - BBC Radio 1's Mary Anne Hobbs joins 6 Music to present weekend breakfasts.
  - BBC Local Radio stations in England and the Channel Islands begin a new Saturday evening show titled BBC Introducing. Hosted by a local presenter on each station, the programme's aim is to promote musicians from the area.
  - Radio 4 marks the 40th anniversary of the United Kingdom's membership of the European Economic Community with a special programme: 40 Years in Europe: How Was It for You?.
- 7 January
  - Debut of the BBC's networked Local Radio Evening programme, hosted by former Classic FM presenter Mark Forrest.
  - Former Spice Girl Emma Bunton joins Jamie Theakston as co-host of the breakfast show on Heart London. Heart Solent breakfast presenters JK and Lucy replace Neil Bentley on Drivetime.
  - Former Heart London presenter Harriet Scott joins BBC London 94.9 as the early weekday breakfast show presenter.
- 9 January – Former Controller of BBC Radio 5 Live, Adrian van Klaveren, will take charge of the BBC's programming to mark the upcoming centenary of the First World War, Broadcast magazine reports.
- 10 January
  - Deputy Prime Minister Nick Clegg joins LBC 97.3 for a weekly live phone-in with presenter Nick Ferrari.
  - Radio 1 Breakfast Show presenter Nick Grimshaw hosts the 2013 BRIT Awards nominations ceremony at London's Savoy Hotel.
  - Test transmissions for DAB+ are under way in the Brighton area, reports the Radio Today website.
- 11 January – Ofcom is inviting applications for community radio licences to operate on medium wave, a move that will keep the frequency in use until at least 2020, reports Radio Today.
- 13 January – Jameela Jamil becomes the new presenter of The Official Chart on BBC Radio 1; she replaces Reggie Yates, who had left the programme the previous month..
- 14 January – Smooth Radio overhauls its schedule. Changes include the introduction of a new movie programme on Saturdays and documentary slot on Sunday afternoons. Daryl Denham becomes weekend breakfast presenter as Pat Sharp takes over Carlos's afternoon show. In turn, Carlos succeeds Andy Peebles as weekday evening presenter, with the latter becoming a weekend presenter.
- 16 January – The BBC Trust finds that Steve Wright's Sunday Love Songs breached the rules on accuracy after inviting listeners to submit dedications despite it being pre-recorded.
- 20 January – BBC sports presenter Clare Balding succeeds Aled Jones as the host of Radio 2's Good Morning Sunday.
- 21 January – South Wales station Nation 80s changes its name to Nation Hits, a move allowing the station to air a broader range of music, reports Radio Today. It is the station's third rebranding since 2009.
- 29 January – BBC Radio 5 Live presenter Shelagh Fogarty is panicked while live on air when a mouse is spotted in the studio.

=== February ===
- 4 February – Aled Jones is signed up by Classic FM to present a Sunday morning programme from March.
- 6 February – Bauer Media buys the digital station Planet Rock for a sum estimated to be between £1m and £2m.
- 10 February – Les Ross returns to radio in Birmingham with a Sunday afternoon show on Big City Radio.
- 11 February – BBC Radio 2 celebrates the 50th anniversary of the recording of The Beatles' album Please Please Me with "Twelve Hours to Please Me" in which today's musical artists pay homage to the album.
- 14 February
  - The Competition Commission publish their preliminary findings into the Global Radio takeover of GMG Radio, recommending a full or partial sale of the now renamed Real and Smooth Radio Ltd.
  - Former head of BBC News Helen Boaden is appointed Director of BBC Radio by incoming BBC Director-General Tony Hall. She will take up the position from April.
- 18 February – BBC journalists stage a one-day strike over compulsory redundancies.

=== March ===
- 4 March – James Whale is to leave London's LBC 97.3 after five years as its drivetime presenter after LBC did not renew his contract.
- 5 March – LBC's evening presenter Iain Dale will take over the drivetime show when James Whale leaves the station, it is announced.
- 8 March – 95.8 Capital FM hires former BBC Radio 1 journalist Dominic Byrne to work on its breakfast show with presenters Dave Berry and Lisa Snowdon.
- 14 March – Global Radio announces that Jenni Falconer will join Heart to host a Sunday morning show, replacing Jason Donovan who is taking a break from the network to tour in the musical Priscilla: Queen of the Desert.
- 22 March – In a rare move for a radio station, and to celebrate the 40th anniversary of the release of Pink Floyd's The Dark Side of the Moon, Smooth 70s plays the album in its entirety.
- 27 March – The Competition Commission is scheduled to publish its final report into Global Radio's takeover of GMG Radio.
- 29 March – BBC journalists stage a twelve-hour strike, disrupting television and radio news programmes.
- 31 March – The Archbishop of Canterbury Justin Welby presents a two-hour special Easter Sunday breakfast programme on Classic FM.

=== April ===
- 7 April – Former BBC Radio 4 newsreader Charlotte Green joins Classic FM to host a weekly Sunday morning programme, Charlotte Green's Great Composers.
- 11 April
  - Radio 2 Breakfast Show presenter Chris Evans is forced to hand over to a colleague after losing his voice live on air.
  - It is reported that Gold presenter Neil Francis has been suspended from the network for comments he made about comedian Jim Davidson on Facebook.
- 12 April – Radio 1 Controller Ben Cooper announces that the station's Radio 1 Chart Show will not air "Ding-Dong! The Witch Is Dead", a song which charted following an internet campaign in the wake of the death of former Prime Minister Margaret Thatcher on 8 April. Instead a portion of the song will air as part of a news item.
- 15 April – Bauer increases networking on its Yorkshire Magic stations with a networked breakfast show coming from Magic 828 in Leeds.
- 23 April – Absolute Radio have removed Absolute Radio 60s and Absolute Classic Rock from several DAB platforms in England and Wales, but the stations continue to broadcast in London and online, the Radio Today website reports.

=== May ===
- 2 May – The Scotsman reports that Glasgow comedian Susan Calman has spoken out after she received death threats following her attempt to lampoon the Scottish independence debate on a recent edition of Radio 4's The News Quiz.
- 10 May – BBC Radio Stoke presenter Paula White is taken off air after slurring her words and appearing to sound drunk while presenting her final weekday afternoon show.
- 12 May
  - As a panel reviews the Sunday papers on BBC Radio 4's Broadcasting House the programme cuts to a ten-second extract of the gospel song Jesus Put a Yodel in My Soul, forcing presenter Paddy O'Connell to apologise for the unexpected interruption.
  - Actor Larry Lamb joins LBC 97.3 and begins presenting a Sunday morning show.
- 16 May – Debut of Question Time Extra Time on BBC Radio 5 Live. The programme, including an audio broadcast of the evening's edition of BBC One's Question Time, is presented by Stephen Nolan and John Pienaar, who take a look at the topics raised by Question Time.
- 17 May – UK Independence Party leader Nigel Farage hangs up during an interview with Good Morning Scotland which he describes as "insulting and unpleasant". He was speaking on the programme following angry protests in Edinburgh the previous day.

=== June ===
- 3 June – The BBC issues an apology after an edition of Radio 5 Live's Fighting Talk featured a debate on whether sports presenter Clare Balding, who is gay, could be "cured" of her sexuality.
- 5 June
  - Ofcom awards five new community radio licences for stations in Northern Ireland.
  - Health and beauty retail chain Superdrug launches an in-store radio station.
- 12 June – Mayor of London Boris Johnson will join LBC to host a monthly phone-in show, it is confirmed.
- 14 June – Kerrang! 105.2's final day of broadcasting on FM in the West Midlands. The 105.2 frequency is taken over by Planet Rock simulcasting from London. Kerrang! continues on DAB, but with content aired from London from 17 June.

=== July ===
- 1 July – Bauer's Scottish MW stations start to receive a networked breakfast show form Glasgow presented by Robin Galloway. Consequently, there is now no local programming on any of these stations.
- 5–7 July – Jazz FM's inaugural Love Supreme Festival, the first greenfield jazz festival to be held in the UK for twenty years, is held at Glynde Place in East Sussex.
- 7 July – BBC sports commentator John Inverdale says he has written to Ladies Wimbledon champion Marion Bartoli to apologise for saying she was "never going to be a looker". He made the comments on BBC Radio 5 Live during the build-up to the previous day's match.
- 8 July – After eight years, BBC Local Radio returns to Dorset when a breakfast show for the county, as an opt-out from BBC Radio Solent, is launched.
- 16 July – BBC presenter Mishal Husain will join Radio 4's Today programme as a core member of its presenting team, the BBC announces. Fellow Today host James Naughtie will take on the additional role of presenting Good Morning Scotland for BBC Radio Scotland as the referendum on Scottish independence approaches.
- 26 July – Digital radio is switched on in Northern Ireland allowing a further 1.4 million listeners to hear stations such as Smooth 70s, Absolute Radio 90s and Jazz FM.

=== August ===
- 4 August – David Jacobs presents the final edition of Radio 2's The David Jacobs Collection after fifteen years. He is stepping down from the role for health reasons.
- 8 August – Smooth Radio hires Andi Peters to present a Sunday lunchtime show.
- 13 August – Sony end their sponsorship agreement with the Radio Academy Awards.
- 27 August – The MXR regional digital radio multiplex for the West Midlands is switched off after 12 years on air.
- 28 August
  - Ofcom finds Liverpool's Radio City 96.7 in breach of broadcasting rules after a listener complained about a feature called Neil or No Neil in which presenter Dave Kelly phones numbers in the United States to ask if there is anyone there named Neil.
  - A contemporary recording of Martin Luther King Jr.'s 1963 speech "I Have a Dream" is aired by Radio 4 and the BBC World Service to make its 50th anniversary.

=== September ===
- 3 September – It is reported that the actress Naomi Watts walked out of a radio interview with Simon Mayo because she was uncomfortable with him asking her about her portrayal of Diana, Princess of Wales in the biopic, Diana.
- 25 September – A Radio 4 news item about a bondage workshop at a village hall becomes an internet hit.
- 28 September
  - Former BBC Radio 4 newsreader, now Classic FM presenter, Charlotte Green makes her debut reading the classified football results on BBC Radio 5 Live and the World Service. Her appointment was announced on 6 August.
  - Radio 3 announces a raft of new weekend programmes. They include a new concert series Live in Concert, a new film music programme called Sound of Cinema, a chance to hear highlights of the weekday lunchtime concerts, consistent times for the station's jazz programming and a new Monday night slot for Opera on 3.
- 30 September – Radio 2 overhauls its schedule.

=== October ===
- 1 October – Smooth Radio is moved to Global Radio's Leicester Square headquarters in London and given a makeover.
- 3 October – Global Radio announces that Smooth 70s will close less than a week after Smooth programming moved to its London headquarters.
- 5 October – Sara Cox becomes a regular presenter on Radio 2 with Sounds of the 80s, a new programme dedicated to hits of the 80s.
- 6 October – Actress Tina Hobley begins presenting a Sunday Morning show on Smooth Radio.
- 7 October
  - Choice FM is rebranded as Capital Xtra.
  - London-based digital station IBC Tamil is found in breach of Ofcom licence conditions following a complaint about a "highly partial" and unreliable news item.
- 17 October
  - Radio Exe suspends Robin Thicke's "Blurred Lines" from its playlist after singer Charlotte Church criticised it as being derogatory to women in an address to the 2013 Radio Festival. They also request listener feedback on whether it should be banned.
  - Former BBC Radio Norfolk presenter Michael Souter is convicted of a series of historical accounts of sexual abuse against boys following a trial at Norwich Crown Court. He is subsequently jailed for 22 years.
- 18 October – Two digital transmitters are switched on in Gloucestershire, allowing DAB broadcasting to begin in the county.
- 25 October – The BBC hosts 100 Women, a day of debate and discussion across radio, television and online featuring a hundred women from around the world.
- 27 October – As the clocks go back an hour at the end of British Summer Time, a glitch at Radio 2 sees the second hour of Bob Harris's late night/early morning show being simultaneously aired with another segment of the show.

=== November ===
- 1 November – Broadcasting of Paul Gambaccini's America's Greatest Hits is suspended from its Saturday night slot on Radio 2 after the presenter is arrested as part of the Operation Yewtree investigation. Gambaccini himself takes the decision not to go on air following media interest in his arrest. He also steps down temporarily as host of Radio 4's music quiz Counterpoint. A year later, it is announced that no charges will be brought against Gambaccini and he much later receives damages from the Crown Prosecution Service.
- 5 November – Internet station Solid Gold Gem celebrates a year on air. The station hires American presenter Ted Bradford to present a one-off weekend show to mark the occasion.
- 15 November – Sara Mohr-Pietsch presents Radio 3 Breakfast for the final time. She leaves the show to become presenter of Radio 3's Wigmore Hall lunchtime concerts and to present Sunday afternoon programme The Choir. She is replaced on 2 December by weekend breakfast presenter Clemency Burton-Hill.
- 28 November – A BBC local radio guest in the North West who claims to have been a disc jockey on Radio Caroline North during the 1960s is challenged as a fake during an on-air interview.
- 29 November – Robbie Vincent announces he will leave Jazz FM. His final show airs on Sunday 1 December.

=== December ===
- 12 December – Nick Ferrari and Charlotte Green are among six radio personalities inducted into the Radio Academy Hall of Fame.
- 19 December – Fearne Cotton apologises to Radio 1 listeners after a microphone left on during a track picks up one of her Christmas party guests swearing.
- 31 December – A financial report released by Global Radio shows the company paid £69m for the purchase of GMG Radio.

== Station debuts ==
- 27 April – Chris Country
- 7 May – Kisstory and KissFresh

== Programme debuts ==
- 16 May – Question Time Extra Time on BBC Radio 5 Live (2013–Present)
- 5 October – Sounds of the 80s on BBC Radio 2 (2013–Present)
- Unknown – The Show What You Wrote on BBC Radio 4 (2013–Present)

== Continuing radio programmes ==
=== 1940s ===
- Sunday Half Hour/The Sunday Hour (1940–2018)
- Desert Island Discs (1942–Present)
- Woman's Hour (1946–Present)
- A Book at Bedtime (1949–Present)

=== 1950s ===
- The Archers (1950–Present)
- The Today Programme (1957–Present)

=== 1960s ===
- Farming Today (1960–Present)
- In Touch (1961–Present)
- The World at One (1965–Present)
- The Official Chart (1967–Present)
- Just a Minute (1967–Present)
- The Living World (1968–Present)
- The Organist Entertains (1969–2018)

=== 1970s ===
- PM (1970–Present)
- Start the Week (1970–Present)
- You and Yours (1970–Present)
- I'm Sorry I Haven't a Clue (1972–Present)
- Good Morning Scotland (1973–Present)
- Newsbeat (1973–Present)
- File on 4 (1977–Present)
- Money Box (1977–Present)
- The News Quiz (1977–Present)
- Feedback (1979–Present)
- The Food Programme (1979–Present)
- Science in Action (1979–Present)

=== 1980s ===
- Steve Wright in the Afternoon (1981–1993, 1999–2022)
- In Business (1983–Present)
- Sounds of the 60s (1983–Present)
- Loose Ends (1986–Present)

=== 1990s ===
- The Moral Maze (1990–Present)
- Essential Selection (1991–Present)
- Essential Mix (1993–Present)
- Up All Night (1994–Present)
- Wake Up to Money (1994–Present)
- Private Passions (1995–Present)
- In Our Time (1998–Present)
- Material World (1998–Present)
- Scott Mills (1998–2022)
- The Now Show (1998–Present)

=== 2000s ===
- BBC Radio 2 Folk Awards (2000–Present)
- Big John @ Breakfast (2000–Present)
- Sounds of the 70s (2000–2008, 2009–Present)
- Kermode and Mayo's Film Review (2001–2022)
- A Kist o Wurds (2002–Present)
- Fighting Talk (2003–Present)
- Jeremy Vine (2003–Present)
- Annie Mac (2004–2021)
- Fearne Cotton (2009–2015)
- Elaine Paige on Sunday (2004–Present)
- The Bottom Line (2006–Present)
- The Christian O'Connell Breakfast Show (2006–Present)
- The Unbelievable Truth (2006–Present)
- Radcliffe & Maconie (2007–Present)
- Geoff Lloyd's Hometime Show (2008–2017)
- The Media Show (2008–Present)
- Newsjack (2009–Present)
- Paul O'Grady on the Wireless (2009–2022)
- Alan and Mel's Summer Escape (2009–2020)

=== 2010s ===
- Weekend Wogan (2010–2015)
- The Chris Evans Breakfast Show (2010–2018)
- Graham Norton (2010–2020)
- Simon Mayo Drivetime (2010–2018)
- Simon Bates at Breakfast (2011–2014)
- The Third Degree (2011–Present)
- BBC Radio 1's Dance Anthems (2012–Present)
- Late Night Graham Torrington (2012–2020)
- The Radio 1 Breakfast Show with Nick Grimshaw (2012–2018)

== Ending this year ==
- 29 March – The Strand (2008–2013)
- 4 August – The David Jacobs Collection (1996–2013)
- 5 September – Ambridge Extra (2011–2013)
- 29 September – Sunday Night at 10 (1998–2013)

== Closing this year ==
| Date | Station | Debut(s) |
|---|---|---|
| 25 March | NME Radio | 2008 |
| 30 July | Yorkshire Radio | 2006 |
| August | Smash Hits Radio | 2002 |
| 6 October | Smooth 70s | 2011 |

== Deaths ==
- 1 January – Christopher Martin-Jenkins, 67, British journalist and cricket correspondent (Test Match Special)
- 2 January – Charles Chilton, 95, English radio presenter and producer
- 3 February – David Oates, 50, BBC sports commentator
- 8 February – Patricia Hughes, 90, BBC radio continuity announcer and newsreader
- 12 February – Reg Turnill, 97, journalist and BBC aerospace correspondent
- 22 March – Brian Tansley, 61, journalist and broadcaster in the East Midlands
- 3 April – Lee Halpin, 26, radio presenter and documentary film maker
- 21 April – Douglas Mounce, 65, British radio presenter (BBC Radio Devon)
- 11 May – Arnold Peters, 87, actor
- 8 June – Mark Turnbull, 50, presenter on BBC Radio Tees
- 11 June – Rory Morrison, 48, newsreader and continuity announcer on BBC Radio 4
- July – Dave Hickman, 54, broadcaster on BRMB, 100.7 Heart FM and 105.7 Smooth Radio
- 25 July – Norman de Mesquita, 81, sports commentator (died 2013)
- 29 August – Cliff Morgan, 83, Welsh rugby union player, sports commentator and broadcasting executive
- 2 September – David Jacobs, 87, British broadcaster
- 24 September – Anthony Lawrence, 101, BBC Radio Far East correspondent
- 19 November – Ray Gosling, 74, broadcast documentary maker
- December – Mike Baker, 65, British broadcaster (Beacon Radio, Saga 105.7FM)
