= Media in Birmingham =

The city of Birmingham, England is home to an evolving media industry, including news and magazine publishers, radio and television networks, film production and specialist educational media training. The city's first newspaper was published in 1732.

== Publishing ==
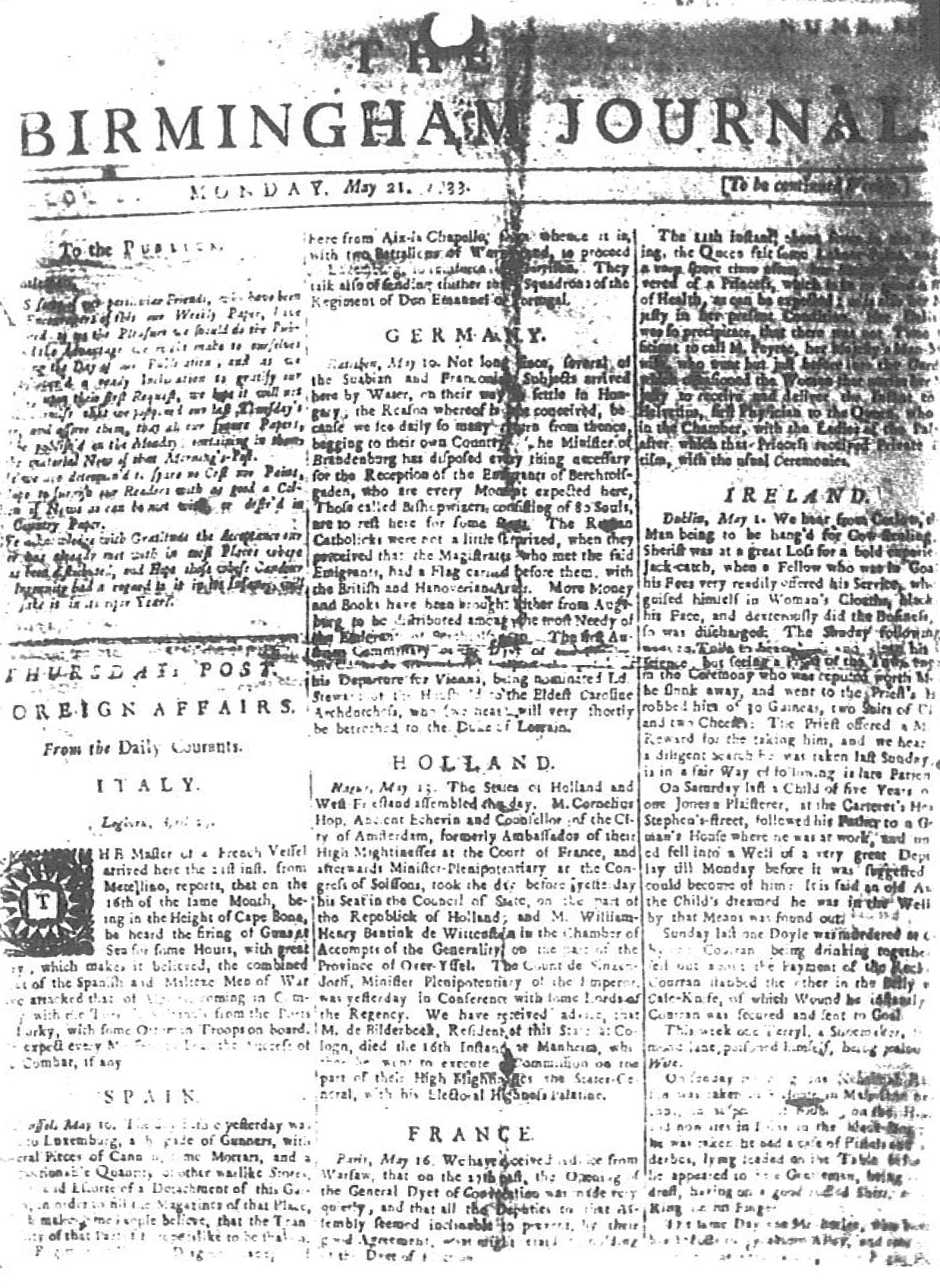
Birmingham's oldest known newspaper: the Birmingham Journal of 21 May 1733

=== History ===
The first known Birmingham newspaper was the Birmingham Journal, which was published by Thomas Warren from 1732 and whose early contributors included Samuel Johnson. The most notable of the town's early newspapers however was Aris's Birmingham Gazette, which was founded in 1741 and continued publishing until 1956.

=== Contemporary ===
Birmingham has two main local newspapers—the Birmingham Post and the Birmingham Mail—as well as the Sunday Mercury, all owned by Reach plc (formerly Trinity Mirror).

In 2018, the Birmingham Mail rebranded their online digital operations as BirminghamLive.

Reach plc additionally own What's On Magazine Group, running since 1986 and currently producing six monthly regional entertainment titles, including What's On Birmingham and LGBT+ publication Midlands Zone.

Reach plc is contracted to publish Forward (formerly Birmingham Voice), the Birmingham City Council's free newspaper distributed to homes, community centres and public buildings. Reach plc previously published the now defunct Birmingham News, a weekly freesheet distributed to homes in the suburbs.

Birmingham has three mainstream digital-only news publishers; I Am Birmingham established in 2009, Birmingham Updates established in 2011, and BirminghamWorld established in 2021. I Am Birmingham is run as a non-profit news publication by independent professional journalists. Birmingham Updates is run as a commercial business enterprise by Updates Media. BirminghamWorld is run as one of many national titles by National World.

Several hyperlocal newspapers serve Birmingham, including the Birmingham Advertiser and the Sutton Coldfield Observer, which serves Sutton Coldfield and parts of Erdington. Independent news publisher Erdington Local additionally serves the Erdington area in both print and online format.

Birmingham is the hub for various national ethnic media, including The Phoenix Newspaper, The Sikh Times, Desi Xpress, and The Asian Today.

National entertainment news publisher Ikonz is based in Birmingham, one of few outside London.

Birmingham culture and lifestyle publications include music magazine Bearded, Fused Magazine, Birmingham Living, Style Birmingham, SixtyNine Degrees, and Dluxe magazine.

== Radio ==
Local radio stations include BBC Radio WM, BBC Asian Network, Hits Radio Birmingham and Greatest Hits West Midlands, 102.2 Capital FM Birmingham, Heart West Midlands, Absolute Radio, and Smooth Radio. The city has a community radio scene, with stations including BRMB, New Style Radio, Switch Radio, Scratch Radio, Raaj FM, and Unity FM. With the rise of internet stations, Birmingham now also has independent radio stations like Brum Radio, serving local, independent and alternative music and arts which doesn't fit the commercial radio format.

=== History ===
Birmingham was the first British city outside London to have a radio service from the newly formed British Broadcasting Company, with the Birmingham station 5IT starting regular broadcasting from its Witton base at 17:00 on 15 November 1922, one day after 2LO started daily BBC broadcasting from London and one hour before the 18:00 launch of Manchester's 2ZY. 5IT pioneered many innovations in early broadcasting, launching Children's Hour in 1922, developing sophisticated methods of programme control and employing the first full-time announcers in 1923. The station's first announcer on its opening night was its general manager Percy Edgar, who was to be the dominant figure in Birmingham broadcasting and the BBC's most influential regional director until his retirement in 1948.

5IT moved its studios from Witton to a former cinema in New Street in 1923, moving again in 1926 to a completely new building in Broad Street with two studios – one of the largest the country. 1927 saw the low-powered city station 5IT replaced by the BBC Midland Region – the first of the BBC's regional services – broadcast from the new Borough Hill high powered transmitter near Daventry. The Broad Street studios now controlled and made programmes for a region stretching across central England from The Potteries to Norfolk.

As Director of the Midland Region Percy Edgar fought against the efforts of Lord Reith to increase control over the BBC from London, writing to Reith in 1929 that "the ever growing policy of centralisation in London has clearly gone a good deal further and more rapidly than public opinion here is prepared to accept" and positioning himself almost as an independent entrepreneur within the wider organisation.

By 1935 the Midland Region was producing 40% of its broadcast material locally, more than either of the other English regions or even the national regions of Scotland, Wales and Northern Ireland. With 14 producers it was largest BBC department outside London. Notable programmes included the detective series Paul Temple which was produced in Birmingham and broadcast nationally from 1938 until 1968. and Midland Parliament, which broke new ground in allowing the on-air discussion of controversial topics by members of the public.

On 30 October 1988, The Asian Network was launched on the MW transmitters of BBC Radio WM and BBC Radio Leicester with a combined output of 70 hours per week, and was extended to 86 hours a week in 1995 and on 4 November 1996 the station became a full-time service, on air 18 hours a day, and was relaunched as BBC Asian Network. The station's key target audience are listeners aged 15–35 of South Asian descent. The station has production centres in London (Broadcasting House) and Birmingham (The Mailbox). In mid-2017, BBC Asian Network's management was merged with that of BBC Radio 1Xtra, creating a super-network for two of the UK's largest ethnic minority groups.

The Archers, the world's longest running radio soap, is recorded in Birmingham for BBC Radio 4.

=== Commercial radio ===
There are two dominating radio stations in Birmingham, Hits Radio Birmingham and Heart West Midlands.

BRMB was the fourth commercial ILR (Independent Local Radio) station to go on the air, after LBC, Capital, and Radio Clyde. Broadcasting a mix of popular music with local news, live football coverage, information and specialist output, the station became popular among residents in Birmingham and later, in 1986, changed its main FM frequency from 94.8 to 96.4. Presenters included Ed Doolan, Les Ross, Phil Upton and Tony Butler. Les Ross was the UK's longest-serving breakfast presenter, presenting BRMB's flagship weekday breakfast show from March 1976 to March 1989, followed by a second stint between August 1993 and September 2002.

In 2012, Orion Media announced that BRMB would be rebranded as Free Radio Birmingham, along with its sister West Midlands stations Beacon, Mercia and Wyvern. The BRMB brand was phased out on Wednesday 21 March 2012 in preparation for the rebrand, which took place at 7pm on Monday 26 March 2012.

Heart 100.7 was the first Heart station to launch in the UK, from studios in Birmingham. It began broadcasting on 6 September 1994, and was the UK's third Independent Regional Radio station, five days after Century Radio North East (now Heart North East) and Jazz FM North West (now Smooth North West).

Global Radio announced plans in 2008 to rebrand most of its stations to Heart, following the takeover of GCAP Media. Today, there are over twenty Heart stations throughout the UK.

Orion Media, owners of Free Radio Birmingham, have their offices based in Brindleyplace. Global Radio, owners of Heart West Midlands, Capital Birmingham and Smooth West Midlands, also have their offices based in Brindleyplace. In May 2016 Orion Media sold to media giant Bauer Media, who now own the Free Radio brand.

== Television ==
=== History ===
The launch of the Sutton Coldfield transmitting station in December 1949 made the Birmingham area the first in Britain outside London to receive a television service.

The most notable achievement of the early years of Birmingham television was Cathy Come Home, described by the BBC itself as "the most famous and groundbreaking TV drama ever made", and judged the second greatest British television programme of the twentieth century in a 2000 survey of broadcast industry professionals by the British Film Institute. First broadcast in 1966 and largely a Birmingham production, it was produced by Balsall Heath-born Tony Garnett, directed by Nuneaton-born Ken Loach, and was the first example of the hard-hitting, high-brow television drama that was to feature strongly in Birmingham's broadcast output over the following decades.

Birmingham and the West Midlands was one of the first areas to receive programming from the new ITV network in 1956. The network's original representatives were Associated TeleVision (ATV) who served the area during the week and ABC Weekend TV who broadcast at the weekends. In 1968, ATV won the contract to serve the area seven days a week and built new studios off Broad Street at the heart of the city featuring the landmark Alpha Tower.

In 1982, ATV was reorganised and became Central Independent Television, which was rebranded as Carlton Central in 1999 and again as ITV Central in 2004. ITV's Birmingham studios produced several shows, including Tiswas, Crossroads and Bullseye, until the complex was closed in 1997, and Central moved to its current Gas Street studios. This was also the main hub for CITV, until the network's children's programming was moved to Manchester in 2004. Central's output from Birmingham now consists of only the West and East editions of the regional news programme Central Tonight.

Other television programmes to have been made or filmed in Birmingham include Blockbusters, Boon, Survivors, Brum, Dalziel & Pascoe, Father Brown, Land Girls, New Faces, Pot Black, Rosie & Jim, The Sky at Night, Spitting Image, The Golden Shot, Woof!, WPC 56, One Born Every Minute, and Gladiators.

=== Current stations and programmes ===
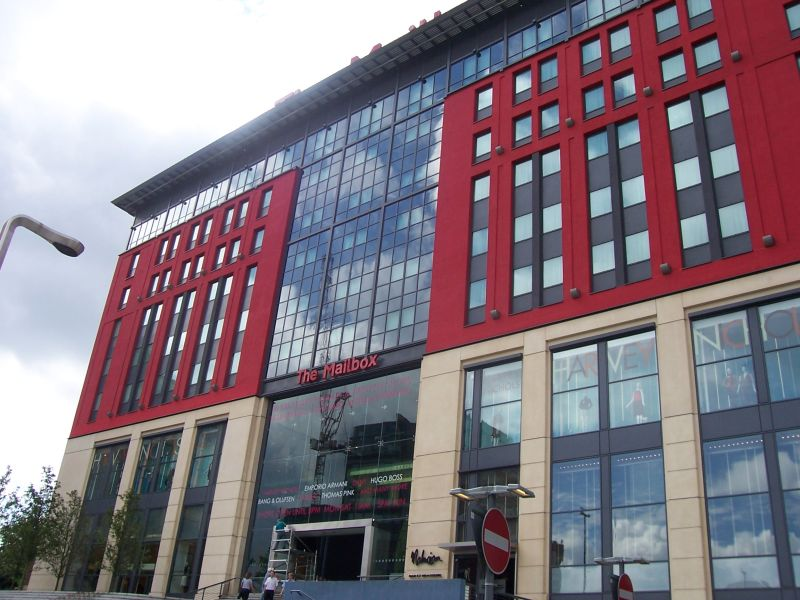
The Mailbox, the BBC's current Birmingham headquarters

The BBC has two facilities in the city. It is the regional headquarters and television centre for BBC West Midlands, which produces Midlands Today and local editions of Inside Out and The Politics Show; and the BBC Local Radio service BBC Radio WM.

BBC Birmingham production centre, based in Mailbox Birmingham, is one of only three in England outside London producing programmes for national broadcast. As of August 2012, most of The Mailbox facility sat unused after the BBC moved the factual departments to Bristol and Cardiff.

In 2018, Birmingham became the second base for BBC Three, following a BBC investment of £10m to allow the online-only platform to commission and publish some of its short-form content in the city, including its Amazing Humans series. The channel also films comedy series Man Like Mobeen in Birmingham.

The BBC Drama Village, based in Selly Oak, is a production facility specialising in television drama and is the home of nationally networked programme Doctors.

Birmingham-based BBC Two television crime drama Peaky Blinders, created by Brummie native film director Steven Knight, is partly filmed in the city, where it has had several of its red carpet premieres.

Birmingham used to be the largest source of nationally networked programmes to BBC One outside London, contributing 8.8% of the channel's first-run originated network hours in 2007, with its 3.6% share making it the fourth largest contributor outside London to BBC Two.

ITV Central have their Gas Street Studios in the city, though the site only produces regional programming; network production from Birmingham for ITV having ceased in 2005.

BSkyB have a base at the University of Birmingham's campus in Edgbaston, including a news bureau and a studio with broadcast, editing and production facilities, covering an area from Mid-Wales to Norfolk and from Sheffield to Oxford.

Following the collapse of City8 in November 2014, Big Centre TV was established, launching on 28 February 2015. On 3 October 2016, Made Television announced it had purchased Big Centre TV for an undisclosed sum, relaunching it as Made in Birmingham on 8 November 2016. In November 2017, the channel cut output and ten staff were made redundant. On 2 January 2018, Made in Birmingham ceased broadcasting on digital satellite and was replaced by a generic Made Television networked feed. On 19 August 2018, Made in Birmingham re-branded as Birmingham TV, in line with parent company Made Television re-branding as Local Television Ltd.

The Sikh Channel, which broadcasts across Europe, Africa and Asia, is based in the city's Aston area.

Birmingham has an independent television production sector, with companies including Maverick Television, who produce Embarrassing Bodies and How to Look Good Naked; and North One Television, whose productions include Fifth Gear and The Gadget Show.

=== Channel 4 relocation bid ===
In May 2018, Birmingham was included in a bid to secure and host the partial relocation of national broadcaster Channel 4. Birmingham's bid was submitted by the West Midlands Combined Authority alongside that of Coventry.

In July 2018, Birmingham made the final shortlist of six cities selected by the broadcaster for possible relocation of its national headquarters or the creation of two creative hubs, moving 300 staff and hundreds of millions of pounds worth of TV programming to the selected city. The relocation from London to Birmingham by Channel 4 has been estimated to create 3,412 jobs in the region, while accountancy estimations suggest the move could directly boost the local economy by £2.3bn between 2021 and 2030. The other five cities shortlisted are Greater Manchester, Bristol, Glasgow, Cardiff and Leeds. Channel 4 will be relocating in 2019.

As of 27 September 2018, the decision from Channel 4 HQ had been delayed, with West Midlands Mayor Andy Street announcing the decision would now be expected in November 2018.

== Film ==
=== Talent ===
Albert Austin (born 13 December 1881 or 1885) was an actor, film star, director and script writer, primarily in the days of silent movies. He was born in Birmingham. He worked for Charlie Chaplin's Stock Company and played supporting roles in many of Chaplin's films, and working as his assistant director.

=== Films ===
Birmingham is the location for several British and international film productions including Felicia's Journey (1999), which used locations in the city that had been used in Take Me High (1973) to contrast the changes in the city.

With Britain having no significant film industry outside London until the 1990s, BBC Birmingham has been seen as "the nearest Britain had to an integrated regional film culture", producing challenging films that attracted both large national audiences and critical approval, such as Philip Martin's Gangsters (1975), a surreal but gritty portrayal of Birmingham's multicultural criminal underworld, and David Rudkin and Alan Clarke's Penda's Fen (1974), which explored the pagan mythology and Mercian identity of the English Midlands.

In recent decades many films have been set in Birmingham exploring aspects of the city's culture and identity. Take Me High (1973), which starred Cliff Richard as a merchant banker reluctantly posted to Birmingham from London, celebrated regionality and used Birmingham's high-rise architecture and then-new post-war redevelopment as a symbol of a gleaming future contrasted against old-fashioned values. 25 years later, Atom Egoyan's Felicia's Journey (1999), adapted from the novel by William Trevor and described by the Guardian as "a small, low-key, atmospheric masterpiece" used many of the same landmarks, but this time as symbols of decay, depicting "two lost souls ... subjugated to the vast inhuman industrial landscape of the city". I Bought a Vampire Motorcycle (1989) used the city's heritage of motorcycle manufacture and heavy metal music to frame a spoof horror movie, a genre also represented by Adam Trotman's Demagogue (1998), and Jon Wright's Tormented (2009).

Birmingham's highly multicultural population has been a theme common to many films set in the city. Handsworth Songs (1986), directed by John Akomfrah, was an experimental documentary that wove together a mosaic of first-hand interviews, archive film and recreated scenes to explore the issues surrounding the Handsworth riots of the 1980s. Knights and Emeralds (1986) centred around racial tensions in the rivalry between West Midlands bands. The controversial 2009 musical 1 Day, a fictionalised depiction of gang culture in Birmingham, was not screened in the city's cinemas amid concerns that it may have provoked unrest among local gangs. Other films with scenes shot in Birmingham include Prostitute (1980), Clockwise (1986), Brassed Off (1996), Sex Lives of the Potato Men (2004), Clubbed (2009), Danny and the Human Zoo (2015), The Girl with All the Gifts (2016), American Assassin (2017), Kingsman: The Golden Circle (2017), Jawbone (2017), and Ready Player One (2018).

=== Enterprise and legacy ===
In the 1920s, Oscar Deutsch opened his first Odeon cinema in the UK, in Perry Barr. By 1930, the Odeon brand was a household name and still thrives today.

The Electric on Station Street opened on 27 December 1909, and is the oldest independent working cinema in the UK; continuing to operate, despite multiple threats of closure over the years.

In 1931, the Birmingham Film Society was established, with an inaugural screening on 18 January 1931 at the Hampton Cinema in Livery Street.

The largest cinema screen in the West Midlands was located at Millennium Point in Birmingham's Eastside, and opened in September 2001 as an IMAX format screen. Unable to maintain commercial viability as large 3D screens became commonplace across commercial cinema multiplexes, the IMAX screen was closed and downgraded in September 2011, before its replacement Giant Screen Cinema was closed in January 2015.

Screen West Midlands, the regional screen agency for the West Midlands, is based in the city's Jewellery Quarter.

Film Birmingham is the Birmingham City Council's Film and Television office, handling queries and filming requests from national and international productions.

The city's primary film festival, the Birmingham Film Festival, was co-founded by filmmaker Kevin McDonagh and actor Dean Williams in 2015 and has been held every year since. It patrons include Peaky Blinders creator Steven Knight and advertising executive Trevor Beattie, whilst its Grand Jury has featured judges including actress Kia Pegg and filmmakers Michael B. Clifford and Joanna Quinn.

== Education ==
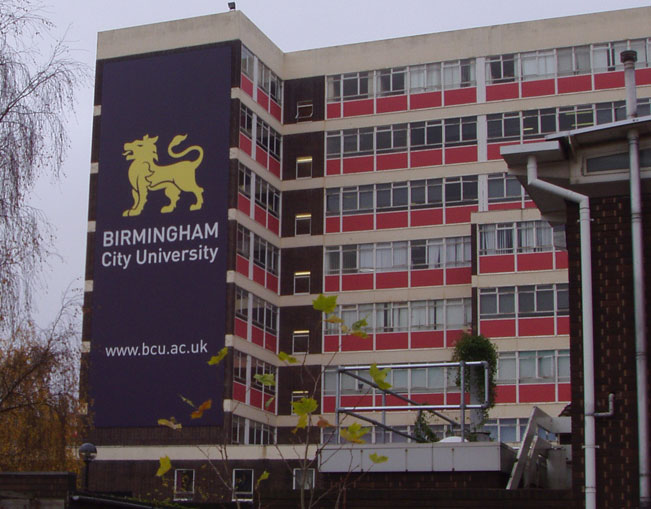
Birmingham City University, which became a Skillset Media Academy in 2007

The provision for media education and training in Birmingham has been acknowledged by Skillset, the sector skills council for the creative media industries.

Birmingham City University (BCU) received accreditation as a Skillset Media Academy in 2007, and its courses at Millennium Point (TEE), Birmingham Institute of Art and Design (BIAD) and the Birmingham School of Media offer theoretical, practical and vocational studies in areas such as television and film, music and audio production, and interactive media.

Further education institutions such as South Birmingham College and Birmingham Metropolitan College house extensive media production facilities and maintain close industry links. Established in 2003, the CSV Media Clubhouse's portfolio of courses comprises industry-standard multimedia production training.

The University of Birmingham's Centre for Contemporary Cultural Studies, founded in 1964 and closed in 2002, produced key theorists and research in media and cultural studies. The university still provides undergraduate and postgraduate education in this field as of 2010, through its Department of Sociology.

== See also ==
- List of libraries in Birmingham, West Midlands

== Bibliography ==
=== Broadcast ===
- Bird, Kenneth (1972), From Pioneers to Pebble Mill - BBC 1922-1972, Birmingham: British Broadcasting Corporation
- Briggs, Asa (2000) [1961], The Birth of Broadcasting, The History of Broadcasting in the United Kingdom, vol. I, London: Oxford University Press, ISBN 0-19-212926-0
- Briggs, Asa (2000) [1965], The Golden Age of Wireless, The History of Broadcasting in the United Kingdom, vol. II, London: Oxford University Press, ISBN 0-19-212930-9
- Briggs, Asa (2000) [1978], Sound and Vision, The History of Broadcasting in the United Kingdom, vol. IV, London: Oxford University Press, ISBN 0-19-212967-8
- Hennessy, Brian; Hennessy, John (2005), The emergence of broadcasting in Britain, Lympstone: Southerleigh, ISBN 0-9551408-0-3

=== Film ===
- Edgar, Justin (2004), "Take Me Higher: Birmingham and Cinema", in Kennedy, Liam (ed.), Remaking Birmingham: the visual culture of urban regeneration, London: Routledge, pp. 117–122, ISBN 0-415-28838-X
