= Elliott Webb =

British radio presenter (born 1971)

Elliott Webb (born 15 April 1971 in Worcester) is an English radio presenter.

== Early career ==
Webb started his career in 1989 at Radio Wyvern in Worcester where he presented the evening show. From there he briefly presented the late night show at Severn Sound in Gloucester and then moved to MFM 103.4 to present evenings again.

In 1991 he moved to Bradford to work at the newly re-launched Pulse of West Yorkshire. He hosted various shows until he took over presenting duties for Breakfast with co-host Debbie Lindley until his departure in 1996.

More early starts followed with his move to Galaxy 101 in Bristol which had recently been acquired by Chrysalis Radio. As part of a major revamp for the station Webb hosted the Breakfast Show with Sally Bailey until March 1997.

== BRMB ==
In April 1997 Webb moved to BRMB, Birmingham to present the evening show and provide holiday cover for the then breakfast host, Les Ross. It was during one of these cover periods in 1999 that Webb hosted the notorious Two Strangers and a Wedding contest where people competed to win the chance to marry a complete stranger. Carla Germaine and Greg Cordell were the chosen couple who tied the knot having met only minutes before. The contest received condemnation from many but generated worldwide publicity for the station. It was later the subject of two networked ITV documentaries and gained much press coverage.

Webb eventually took over the breakfast show full-time following the departure of Ross in 2002. After 12 years, Webb was axed from BRMB in October 2009 following the purchase of the station by new owner Orion Media.

== Hit40UK and 95.8 Capital FM ==
In 2003 Webb covered presenting duties for the nationally broadcast chart show Hit40UK. He has also presented the Capital FM produced and networked weekly entertainment show Seven and the Capital FM weekend breakfast show.

== Current radio work ==
Since leaving BRMB, Webb has been working as a freelance presenter for a variety of BBC and commercial stations. Regular shows include weekday mid-mornings on BBC Hereford & Worcester and Sunday afternoon on Heart Gloucestershire. He also covers shows on BBC Radio WM, BBC Radio Shropshire and BBC CWR. From 3 November 2014, Webb hosted the breakfast show full-time with Toni McDonald following the departure of Howard Bentham on BBC Hereford and Worcester. Webb currently hosts the Daytime show on BBC Hereford and Worcester, with his producers Kalpana Boodhoo and Charlotte Broadbent. A most recent project involved Webb attempting to brew his own cider with apples and pears from the station's car park.

== Television ==
Webb has presented and contributed to a wide variety of TV shows throughout his career. These include regional news bulletins for Yorkshire Television's Calendar, Two Strangers and a Wedding documentaries for ITV, The Home Health Show for Discovery Home and Health, The Last Word for ITV Central and the weekly studio debate show Central Extra also for ITV Central.

== Flaps podcast ==
Along with former BRMB producer Mark Newman, Webb is a presenter and producer of the award-winning Flaps podcast which discusses topics of interest to private and general aviation pilots. He was also a holder of a private pilot licence, which has now lapsed.

== Awards ==
- 2011 Sony Radio Awards - Best Internet Programme - Bronze
- 2007 Sony Radio Awards - The Interactive Programme Award - Silver
- 2006 GCap Media Awards - Best Interactive Bit
- 2005 New York Radio Festival - Best Music/Personality Show - Silver
- 2005 New York Radio Festival - Best Comedy/Humour Personality - Bronze
