= Caroline Martin =

British radio presenter

Caroline Martin is a British radio presenter. She presents the weekend breakfast show on BBC Local Radio in the West of England, and a late-night show on some weekdays for the Wolverhampton radio station WCR FM.

== Early life ==
Martin was born in Cambridge, England. She grew up near Cambridge. She was named after Radio Caroline, a radio station at which she would later work.

== Career ==
Martin began to broadcast on Radio Caroline, a pirate radio station off the coast of the East of England, in May 1986. Martin was 17 or 18 when she was on the Ross Revenge ship of Radio Caroline when its crew were brought to safety during a storm.

She presented on Contact 94, a radio station which broadcast to the Channel and Islands and part of France in the late 1980s and early 1990s.

As of 1996, she was co-presenting a show on Invicta Supergold in Kent with Dave Asher.

In 2006, Martin, who was then working at the original BRMB, and Elliott Webb, were involved in a student by the radio station where two people were married on the same day on which they met; the two people who got married were chosen by judges from a shortlist. Martin co-presented the breakfast show on the original BRMB with Elliott Webb until 2009. Prior to leaving BRMB to work at BBC WM 95.6 (now known as BBC Radio WM), Martin presented The Sanctuary, a late-night talk and phone-in show which was broadcast on the original BRMB and other commercial radio stations in the West Midlands region.

In November 2012, Martin started presenting a show between midday and 2pm on weekdays on BBC WM 95.6 (now known as BBC Radio WM). On the show, she took calls, SMS messages and other text-based contributions from listeners about various topics; she also had a "dilemma" feature on the show. When changes were made to BBC Local Radio schedules to make most shows four hours in duration, Martin presented between 10am and 2pm Monday-Thursday on the station. Martin then presented the late-night show between 10pm and 1am on Sunday to Thursday evenings (and Friday mornings) across the whole of the West Midlands and East Midlands regions on BBC Local Radio. However, her Sunday night/Monday morning programme was not broadcast in the East Midlands region. In the latter half of 2023, when a new late-night show began to be broadcast across all BBC Local Radio stations, Martin moved to presenting the weekend breakfast show on BBC Radio Gloucestershire, BBC Radio Bristol, BBC Radio Somerset and BBC Radio Wiltshire. In November 2023, Martin began presenting The Sanctuary again on WCR FM in Wolverhampton; since the show began to be broadcast on WCR FM, she has presented the show on Monday and Wednesday evenings from 10pm until midnight.

== Personal life ==
Martin's co-presenter at Invicta Supergold, Dave Asher, was Martin's romantic partner at some point, and they had a son together. She also had several children with another romantic partner, Adam Bridge, who was at one point the controller of BRMB, where Martin also worked.

In a 2006 interview, she described herself as a being particularly fond of the music of Fleetwood Mac.

In 2012, she publicly expressed her anger at the unprovoked violent physical assault of her 19-year-old son in Tamworth, Staffordshire.
