= Buzz FM =

- Birmingham; England
- Frequency: 102.4 FM

Programming
- Format: Popular, Jazz, Soul, Asian, Reggae, Calypso, Hip Hop and others

History
- First air date: 14 May 1990
- Last air date: 31 December 1994

Buzz FM was a United Kingdom radio station which was on the air between 1990 and 1994. It was broadcast to Birmingham on 102.4 MHz, and was launched as the city's fourth radio station after BBC Radio WM, BRMB and Xtra AM. The signal came from a transmitter on the roof of Metropolitan House in Edgbaston.

== History ==
The station began broadcasting on 14 May 1990 with a view to providing Birmingham with a locally orientated service that would give priority to the city as opposed to the West Midlands as a whole. In addition, Buzz FM promised to offer listeners a wide range of music that it felt was being ignored by other stations. Daytime programming would be taken up with shows that catered for a multi-ethnic audience, while night time broadcasting would be given over to specialist shows. Listeners to Buzz FM could expect to hear music as diverse as easy soul, contemporary jazz, hip hop, reggae, calypso and classical music.

The first show, the Breakfast Show, was hosted by Welsh broadcaster Mark Williams, and there were high hopes for Buzz, but within six months the station was experiencing difficulties. A massive shortfall in advertising revenue meant that it was losing money, and there were also problems with reception. The frequency that had been specified by the Independent Broadcasting Authority coupled with the relatively low output of its transmitter (when compared to its rivals) made listening a frustrating business. Listeners living on the fringes of its catchment area could expect interference from stations in neighbouring areas, while motorists (part of the station's target-audience) also experienced difficulties in receiving the signal.

A number of attempts were made to rectify the station's problems. Radio Clyde invested around one million pounds into the station and increasing its holding to 96 per cent by April 1992. The recession continued to dent advertising, and the station was still losing hundreds of thousands of pounds; at the end of 1992, the station was once again sold on, this time to former pirate radio DJ Chris Cary, for £1 as well as a commitment to back up the station's debts.

Under Cary, Lindsay Reid was Chief Engineer, Alistar Cochrane was Head of Sales and Head of News and Features was Sybil Fennell - well known for her longstanding work with London news station LBC. Birmingham native John Ryan was brought in from local radio in Ireland to present the breakfast show; by the middle of 1993, the financial losses were under control, and Buzz FM started to go into profit. At this time Buzz FM sounded like a very slick, commercial and vibrant station in a radio market that was becoming increasingly competitive. But, once again, problems with reception were causing issues for its long-term success. There were several management shake-ups, however, audience figures and revenue failed to improve significantly. Not even the recruitment of some former BRMB presenters (including Brendan Kearney and Graham Torrington) helped to improve the station's fortunes. On 11 November 1993 at 5:15 pm, the station was dramatically taken off air by owner Chris Cary. He arrived at the station with removal trucks and took away the broadcasting equipment. Two weeks later, on 25 November 1993 at 10:24 pm, Buzz FM relaunched under new owner Muff Murfin.

The station's licence was due to expire at the end of 1994; Murfin filed for a renewal, and the Radio Authority had offered a new frequency (102.2 MHz) and stronger technical facility for the next franchise term, but competing applicants showed up. Birmingham Country Radio proposed a country music station; Eagle Radio suggested a dance music station; and Choice FM, modelled on a similar station in London, proposed a service focusing on Afro-Caribbean and ethnic communities in the Birmingham area. In April, the Radio Authority selected Choice FM's bid for the new licence term beginning in 1995. Buzz FM ceased broadcasting at midnight on 31 December 1994. Choice FM began a few moments later.

Choice FM Birmingham was on the air for four years before being renamed as Galaxy 102.2 after it was bought out by Chrysalis. The station was subsequently relaunched and re-branded as Capital Birmingham on 3 January 2011 as part of a merger of Global Radio's Galaxy and Hit Music networks to form the nine-station Capital radio network.
