= Birmingham School of Media =

- Former names: Department of Media and Communication
- Type: Media school
- Established: 2004
- Affiliations: Birmingham City University, Faculty of Performance, Media and English
- Vice-Chancellor: Philip Plowden
- Head of school: Sarah Jones
- Academic staff: Faculty of Arts, Design and Media
- Location: Birmingham, West Midlands, England, United Kingdom
- Campus: Urban
- Website: mediacourses.com

Birmingham School of Media, known informally as BCU Media, is a school of Birmingham City University in the city of Birmingham, England. It is part of the Faculty of Arts, Design and Media, which also includes the Birmingham School of Acting, the Birmingham Conservatoire, and the School of English.

It was one of the first in the country to teach media studies and has accredited status as a Skillset Media Academy. In August 2013, the School moved into the new, purpose-built, Parkside facility, at Birmingham City University's City Centre Campus, next to the Millennium Point complex.

Subjects taught at the school include communications, the creative industries, event management, interactive media, journalism, photography, popular music, public relations, radio, and television. Alongside provision for undergraduate and postgraduate education, the school teaches short courses geared towards the media industry.

The school includes an academic research centre, Birmingham Centre for Media and Cultural Research.

== History ==
The school was formerly known as the Department of Media and Communication, and was part of the Birmingham Institute of Art and Design (BIAD) until a re-organisation of the university's faculties in mid-2008.

Until August 2013, the school was based on the first, second, third and fourth floors of the Baker Building at the university's City North Campus in Birmingham's Perry Barr area.

In 2009, the school's introduction of master's degrees focusing on multimedia and entrepreneurial skills for journalists and photographers was cited by the Poynter Institute as a demonstration of how the university was "leading the way in 21st-century journalism education". A postgraduate degree in social media was criticised in the popular press, though staff at the school argued its relevance and scholarliness.

== Alumni ==
- Smitthi Bhiraleus (MA Media Production) – television executive
- Paul Bradshaw (BA Media 1998) – online journalist and media academic
- Marverine Cole (PGDip Broadcast Journalism 2003) – television and radio presenter and news reporter
- Kirsten O'Brien (BA Media and Communication 1993) – television presenter
- Mary Rhodes (BA Media and Communication (Television) 1990) – television presenter
- Margherita Taylor (BA Media and Communication) – radio and television presenter

== See also ==
- Education in Birmingham
- Media in Birmingham
