= Choice Digital =

UK radio station

United Kingdom
- Broadcast area: UK and Ireland

Programming
- Format: Commercial Radio
- Affiliations: Choice FM

Ownership
- Owner: Global Radio

Links
- Website: choicefm.com

Choice Digital was the digital variant of London radio station Choice FM, which could previously be heard via DAB Digital Radio in many locations around the UK and on Sky Digital channel 0114 and online at its website.

In October 2013, this station ceased to exist and was replaced with the national DAB station Capital Xtra.

== DAB digital radio multiplexes ==
- DRG London (Greater London)
- MXR North East (North East England)
- MXR North West (North West England)
- MXR Severn Estuary (South Wales and West of England)
- MXR West Midlands (West Midlands)
- MXR Yorkshire (Yorkshire)

== See also ==
- Choice FM
- List of radio stations in the United Kingdom
