= Adrian Goldberg =

English journalist

- Born: Northfield, Birmingham, England
- Education: Birmingham University
- Occupations: Journalist, radio presenter

Adrian Goldberg (born in Harborne, Birmingham) is an English journalist, radio and television presenter. He currently hosts the Byline Times Podcast, Where's The Money Gone? podcast about the business of football (with Charlie Methven) and The Liquidator Podcast, a West Bromwich Albion fan podcast.

== Family background ==
Adrian is the son of Rudolph Goldberg, a German immigrant who fled from the Nazi regime as a 13-year-old child with his 11-year-old brother Werner, thanks to one of the last Kindertransport arranged by Sir Nicholas Winton. Rudolph Goldberg's parents and other relatives were killed at Auschwitz concentration camp during the Holocaust, to whom he later erected a memorial in the Jewish section at Witton Cemetery. After serving in the British Army in the latter part of World War II, in 1950 Rudolph Goldberg married Kitty and had four children: John, Marion, Judith and Adrian. The family latterly settled in Northfield, Birmingham, where Rudolph died in 2012 aged 87.

== Career ==
Goldberg was a presenter of the Breakfast Show on BBC Radio WM. He also presented The Politics Show on BBC TV for the Midlands region, and was a reporter on the BBC TV consumer programme Watchdog. Goldberg continues to write a regular column for the Birmingham Mail.

In 2006, Goldberg resigned from BBC Radio WM, in order to launch The Stirrer, a news and campaigning website for Birmingham and the Black Country, declaring himself to be "on a mission". He also formed production company Kick in the Grass, which produced a documentary about disquiet in the world of football – Manchester DisUnited. In July 2007, Goldberg was listed at number 41 in the Birmingham Post's annual Power 50 of the people they consider the most powerful and influential in the West Midlands.

In August 2008, Goldberg joined Talksport and presented the overnight 1 am – 6 am slot from Monday to Thursday. After closing down The Stirrer, he left Talksport in September 2010 to present 5 Live Investigates, a current affairs programme for Radio 5 Live. The programme ran until May 2019, with the final episode covering fire risks in tower blocks.

He returned to BBC Radio WM to present a Saturday morning phone-in programme, before taking over Ed Doolan's BBC Radio WM Monday to Thursday lunch-time shows from September 2011. From February 2012, Goldberg's show moved to the 9 am – midday slot.

He left BBC Radio WM again in September 2014, ostensibly to concentrate on making and contributing to network radio and television programming, having suggested he enjoyed his Radio 5 Live Investigates programmes and making a BBC Radio 4 documentary. He also occasionally reported on BBC News.

In December 2014, it was announced he was returning to BBC WM to present the breakfast show again, from the end of February 2015. He left BBC WM for the final time to date in February 2017, citing other broadcasting commitments.

As of 2022, Goldberg hosts a show on alternative radio station 'Brum Radio' titled Adventures in Music, and a weekly podcast for the Byline Times.

== Personal life ==
Goldberg has a degree in English from Birmingham University. He has three daughters, and is a supporter of West Bromwich Albion Football Club.
