= Frank Stewart Gospel Hour =

The Frank Stewart Gospel Hour is a former radio show heard on BBC Radio WM, BBC CWR and BBC Radio Stoke.

== History ==
Stewart started by appearing on the Roots Rock and Reggae show on BBC Radio WM, hosting a five-minute spot on the popular show. Due to the demand, Stewart was given his own air time by the BBC to produce and host his own gospel show on Sunday nights. The Frank Stewarts Gospel Hour was Britain's longest-running Gospel, broadcasting to a wide audience, black and white.

=== About Frank Stewart ===
Frank Stewart was part of an acoustic gospel octet called the Singing Stewarts. Their calypso-style music paved the way for funkier forms of gospel when British church music still consisted largely of ancient hymns. The Singing Stewarts are no longer playing together. Stewart was also a writer for the Caribbean Times newspaper.

Frank Stewart died on Monday 2 April 2012 in hospital with family members by his side.
