= Smitthi Bhiraleus =

Thai businessman

- Born: Bangkok, Thailand
- Occupations: CEO and managing director of VERY TV and MTV Thailand

Smitthi Bhiraleus (Thai: สมิทธิ เพียรเลิศ) is the founder, CEO and managing director of VERY TV and MTV Thailand. In early 2003, he joined Channel [V] Thailand as a general manager and was awarded a place in Thailand's top 50 young executive list in 2003, 2004 and 2005 by Manager Newspaper Group. He resigned from Channel [V] Thailand in early 2006 to set up his own company VERY Inc, the current partner of MTV Asia Networks, and launched a Thai version of MTV, MTV Thailand, on True Visions under this company on 16 May 2008.

Bhiraleus attended Satit Prasanmit Junior High School in Bangkok, Thailand. He then moved to the UK and studied at Sherborne School. Smitthi graduated from high school and enrolled at University College London, where he was awarded a first-class honours degree. He then obtained a master's degree in media production from Birmingham City University.
