= WCR FM =

101.8 WCR FM Wolverhampton Community Radio
- Wolverhampton; England
- Frequency: 101.8 FM
- RDS: WCR FM

History
- First air date: 30 March 2007

Links
- Webcast: Listen Live
- Website: www.wcrfm.com

101.8 WCR FM is a community radio station that broadcasts to the city of Wolverhampton, England, on the VHF frequency of 101.8 MHz under an Ofcom - Community Radio licence, at 6:00 a.m. on 30 March 2007 originally from studios in the Newhampton Arts Centre. Jason Forrest hosted the first show with Beverley Knight's 'Greatest Day’ being the first song played. WCR FM aims to be a vibrant, informative and hyperlocal station providing the city with an alternative service with a mix of speech, specialist and niche programming.

It operates from a purpose developed three-studio broadcast, production and training complex on the second floor of the Mander Centre following a move from their launch studios at Newhampton Arts Centre in April 2022.

Programme content is primarily produced in-house with a degree of syndicated programming from external sources. Wolverhampton has a mixed-race population of approximately 260,000 and although primarily an English-language station, WCR FM also offers a broadcasting platform for various ethnic and community groups.

== Notable presenters ==
- Les Ross
- Caroline Martin

== History ==
WCR FM is related to Wolverhampton Campus Radio, WCR AM, which broadcast to the Wulfrun campus of Wolverhampton College.
