= Tony Butler (broadcaster) =

British sports broadcaster (1935–2023)

Tony Butler, born Robin Anthony E. Butler (15 May 1935 – 14 July 2023) was a British sports broadcaster from Birmingham. He was one of the first stars of local radio in Britain, known for a distinctive local accent and sometimes controversial style.

In 2007, he was honoured by the Sony Radio Academy with a Lifetime Achievement Award.

== Early career ==
Tony Butler was born in Wolverhampton on 15 May 1935. He began his journalistic career in local papers in Birmingham before beginning to contribute to BBC national and regional radio in the 1960s. His strong regional accent caused problems at the staid BBC, and he later recalled how he was encouraged to soften his natural accent. At one point the BBC even provided elocution lessons.

== BRMB ==
In 1974, he was hired to be the first sports editor at Birmingham's new independent (i.e. non-BBC) radio station BRMB, one of a handful of commercial stations to launch at that time. With BRMB striving to offer something different from the established BBC radio stations, Butler was encouraged to speak informally on the air, emphasising rather than hiding his accent.

After being sent on a tour of radio stations in Canada and the US, Butler noticed the success of the forthright North American broadcasters and, back in the UK, he began to develop a similar aggressive manner on the air, offering controversial opinions and arguing with callers to his shows. In another innovation imported from across the Atlantic, Butler began to offer sports fans the opportunity to call into his shows with their opinions of their teams' performances, giving birth to his boast that he was the inventor of the football phone-in.

Butler's much repeated catchphrase "On 'yer bike" was used to cut off callers whose opinions he disagreed with, whilst his competitions would tax listeners with questions such as "How many yards of elastic are there in a golf ball?". During live coverage of football games, fans were encouraged to "get those prayer mats out" to help their ailing teams. Similar encouragement was offered through frequent playing of "The Butler Theme Tune" (in reality Hurricane Smith's "Theme from an Unmade Silent Movie").

Butler's outspokenness and unique radio shows soon made him one of Birmingham's most recognised voices. It helped that the late 1970s and early 1980s were a particularly good time for local sport, with five of the West Midlands' teams enjoying top-flight football. Butler and his team of reporters were also able to cover memorable European campaigns for Aston Villa, West Bromwich Albion and Wolverhampton Wanderers. His abrasive style, locally well-known, was brought to national attention after being worked into the routines of Birmingham comic Jasper Carrott, who often liked to poke fun at the homespun nature of BRMB's programming at the time.

In 1984, Butler was sacked from BRMB after a row with fellow broadcaster Brian Savin, who is disabled. Savin had sent a note to Butler complaining about coverage of a cricket match over-running into his show; Butler was said to have found the content of the note offensive and confronted Savin, grabbing him by the neck during the ensuing argument. The dismissal of such a high-profile personality was front-page news in Birmingham, and programmes on BRMB were severely affected as some of Butler's former colleagues walked out on strike.

Butler later commented that the matter had been blown out of all proportion, claiming that he remained friends with Savin. He preferred to attribute the sacking to a general falling-out with BRMB management.

== BBC ==
Following his sacking, Butler was snapped up more or less immediately by the BBC local TV news programme Midlands Today often reporting on the lighter items and demonstrating a much softer side to his nature than anyone had hitherto seen. He also presented successful local TV shows Sporting Butler, Boating Butler and Biking Butler, travelling around the region meeting people with an interesting story to tell.

In 1987, Tony Inchley was appointed Manager of ailing BBC Radio WM, at a time when the BBC was under pressure from the government to justify its provision of local radio services. Inchley swiftly revamped the BBC station's output, hiring a number of personalities and recruiting Butler to restart his Friday night football phone-in in direct competition with BRMB's George Gavin, Butler's former deputy.

Butler was subsequently promoted to host the prestigious breakfast show, replacing Ed Doolan (who then began his hugely popular lunchtime show). Under Butler, Radio WM's breakfast show was a mix of current affairs, information and phone-in competitions, the presenter able to show his versatility switching from interviewing politicians to chatting with callers. He gave away eggcups and mugs to the same callers week in week out. He continued to host the Friday night football phone-in.

However, Butler was still unable to shake off his controversial image; in 1989 Radio WM's reporters found themselves banned from covering Wolverhampton Wanderers games after the club accused Butler of making racist comments about one of their black players, Shane Westley.

When Tony Inchley announced his retirement, Butler felt his time was up, so he decided to leave.

== Xtra AM ==
In 1994 Butler moved back to commercial radio, hosting the breakfast show on BRMB spin-off station Xtra-AM, giving him the opportunity to play more music. During this time he also co-hosted Xtra's Friday night football phone-in, along with sports editor Tom Ross.

== Back to the BBC ==
The purchase of Xtra-AM by the Capital Radio group saw the end to most of the locally produced programming, and so in 1998, Butler made his way back to Radio WM. Firstly, presenting a Saturday lunchtime show, before taking over his Monday – Thursday evening football phone-in show from 7 to 8 pm and the Sportsnight show on Mondays from 8 to 10 pm.

== Birmingham Live TV ==
In 1998 Butler joined local cable TV station Birmingham Live TV, a regional affiliate of MGN's L!VE TV. As part of the sports team, he presented the local sports bulletins on the channel, as well as going out to interview sporting figures across the West Midlands. He also hosted a live phone-in show on the channel every Friday night called 'Butler's Sports Special'. He remained at Birmingham Live until its closure in November 1999.

== Controversy at BBC Radio WM ==
Butler courted additional controversy on BBC Radio WM, broadcast on 28 March 2007. He stated that women should not be in war zones and, commenting on kidnapped British sailor Faye Turney, said that were she decapitated, "it would serve her right."

His outburst prompted a barrage of complaints from listeners, and led the BBC to issue an apology.

== Retirement ==
Butler announced in April 2009 that he would retire at the end of the 2008–09 football season, commenting "I think you know when it's time to retire, and I'm on my bike."

== Return to commercial radio ==
In August 2009, after Orion took control of BRMB and Gold, it was announced by Tom Ross that Butler would be returning to co-host the football phone-in on Friday nights.

In August 2012, Ross revealed that Butler had finally ended his broadcasting career due to ill health. Ross paid tribute to Butler in an emotional telephone interview with his predecessor on his opening football phone-in show of the 2012–13 season, thanking him for bringing him to BRMB over thirty years earlier.

== Death ==
Butler died on 14 July 2023, at the age of 88.
