= Capital Xtra =

British radio station

Coordinates: 51.51007°N 0.12929°W

Capital XTRA
- London; England
- Broadcast area: United Kingdom
- Frequencies: DAB: 11D (England, Wales and Northern Ireland; DAB: 12A (Scotland); FM: 96.9 MHz (South London); FM: 107.1 MHz (North London); Sky (UK only): 0112; Freesat: 720; Virgin Media: 959
- RDS: CAP XTRA

Programming
- Format: Grime/hip hop/R&B

Ownership
- Owner: Global Radio
- Sister stations: Capital XTRA Reloaded; Capital FM; Capital Dance; Capital Chill

History
- First air date: 31 March 1990 (as Choice FM); 7 October 2013 (as Capital XTRA)

Links
- Webcast: Global Player
- Website: CapitalXtra.com/radio

Capital XTRA (formerly Choice FM) is a British digital radio station owned and operated by Global. It broadcasts on 96.9 and 107.1 FM in Greater London, and nationally on DAB, Global Player and television platforms. It specialises in hip hop, grime and R&B music, and is a commercial competitor to BBC Radio 1Xtra.

As of February 2026, the station broadcasts to a weekly audience of 1.9 million listeners, according to RAJAR.

== History ==
Choice FM logo until 2013.

=== Choice 96.9 ===
Choice 96.9 began as an independent company in March 1990, broadcasting from studios in Trinity Gardens, Brixton. It was Britain's first 24-hour black music radio station with a licence, covering South London. The group won a second licence (see Buzz FM) in 1995, bringing a local version of their London offering to Birmingham, on 102.2 FM - in place of Buzz FM.

The advent of digital radio in the UK saw Choice, which already had an active webstream, joining the new MXR consortium and launching a DAB service which anchored London output with news inserts produced by the consortium's news service DNN.

The Birmingham licence was sold to Chrysalis Radio in 1999 and became Galaxy Birmingham, but Choice expanded within the capital in May 2000 when a largely independent North London licence was awarded for Choice 107.1, with the intention of reaching a larger Afro-Caribbean audience outside the limited range of the coverage from Brixton. The station was now broadcasting from Borough High Street, Borough, London.

Having previously been a minority shareholder, Capital Radio Group took full control of the station in February 2004 and moved the station's base from the target service area to the group's central studios in London's Leicester Square. The move resulted in a community march from the coverage area and their studios. It was accused of selling out as some of their DJs were removed and replaced by their Kiss counterparts who play some electronic music.

By 12 October 2004, Capital had received and implemented a merger of their FM licences, operating a service across the capital on the two frequencies and cutting back on the North London-specific music requirements.

Following their takeover of Choice, Capital Radio Group merged with GWR to form GCap Media in 2005. Choice was flagged up as one of the key brands of the new larger network, and the station was made available to digital TV viewers via its addition to Sky (and later to Virgin Media).

GCap were subsequently taken over by Global Radio, who already owned the Galaxy Network of dance/urban music stations. Despite the separate music format and branding, Choice was marketed to advertisers as part of the Galaxy network for package advertising deals. In 2010 Global Radio announced that the Galaxy network stations would be networked with 95.8 Capital FM, leaving Choice as a standalone brand again.

=== Capital XTRA ===
Logo until 2022.

On 3 October 2013, Global announced that Choice would be rebranded as Capital XTRA on 7 October, sister station to Capital and using a naming scheme in reference to BBC Radio 1 and its sister station Radio 1Xtra.

A number of high-profile signings were made, at launch including former BBC Radio 1 and 1Xtra DJ Tim Westwood, and subsequently Kiss FM DJ Jez Welham for the station's flagship show, Capital XTRA In The Morning.

Initially, the station introduced dance music alongside the urban offering provided by Choice FM. However, ratings, particularly in London, suffered, leading to a move back towards the mixture of primarily black music genres that is now heard on the station, which proved successful between 2014 and 2020 in the UK radio listening measurement system, RAJAR.

Capital XTRA refreshed its weekend schedule at the start of 2018, hiring Afrobeats artist and DJ Afro B to host the Afrobeats show previously hosted by DJ Abrantee, and student radio winner Robert Bruce for a new UK-music led programme, 'Homegrown'. In a coup for the station, legendary hip-hop presenter DJ Semtex moved from BBC Radio 1Xtra to host the same slot on Capital XTRA in October 2018.

In September 2019, a new weekday Breakfast show was launched, hosted by former evening presenter Yinka Bokinni, and Shayna-Marie Birch-Campbell.

On 5 August 2022, Capital XTRA confirmed that Yinka Bokinni had quit the station. Evening show host Robert Bruce was subsequently confirmed to co-host the breakfast slot with incumbent presenter Shayna-Marie. Omah Howard replaced Robert Bruce on the evening show.

On 1 September 2023, Manny Norte announced he would step down his mid morning weekday show to focus on his weekend shows with immediate effect. He presented the weekday slot for over 10 years with Omah Howard replacing him.

On 2 September 2023, Remel London announced she would leave the station being replaced by Jourds

=== Capital XTRA Reloaded ===
A spin-off station, Capital XTRA Reloaded, was launched on 2 September 2019. It featured former Galaxy Birmingham presenter Sacha Brooks as host of the station's flagship show. Available nationally on DAB+, the station plays non-stop old skool hip-hop and R&B anthems.

=== Listening figures ===
Having launched with 850,000 listeners, Capital XTRA reached a peak of 1.9 million listeners across the UK in 2019. Following management changes in 2020, listenership dropped to an estimated 1.3 million people. As of 2025, the station broadcasts to a weekly audience of 2 million, according to RAJAR.

== Programming ==
At Capital XTRA's peak, thematic programming included 'Reloaded', a daily hour of uninterrupted old-skool Hip-Hop and R&B anthems, "Homegrown", a focus on emerging UK talent including interviews and guest mixes, and "Chilled", a slow-jamz segment on weeknights and Sunday mornings. Since listening figures began falling in 2021, the majority of such programming has been axed, with output favouring a hegemonic playlist.

Capital Xtra Current Presenters:

- Dynamic, weekdays 1am-4am
- Jojo Silva, weekday Early Breakfast 4am - 6:30am
- Robert Bruce and Shayna Marie, weekdays 6:30am - 10am (Capital Xtra Breakfast)
- Omah Howard, weekdays 10am - 1pm & Saturday 1pm - 4pm
- Toni Phillips, weekdays 1pm - 4pm
- Yasser, weekdays 4pm - 7pm & Saturday 9am - 1pm
- Kamila Rose, weekdays 7pm - 10pm
- Leah Davis, weekdays 10pm - 1am
- Teeshow, Friday 7pm - 9pm
- DJ Semtex, Friday 9pm - 11pm
- Kennedy Taylor, Friday 11pm - 1am
- Temi Jonah, Saturday & Sunday 1am - 6am
- Glory, Saturday & Sunday 6am - 9am
- Jourds, Saturday & Sunday 4pm - 7pm
- Manny Norte, Saturday 7pm - 11pm and Sunday (The Norte Show) 7pm - 10pm
- Afro B, Saturday 11pm - 1am (Afrobeats with Afro B)
- Zeze Millz Sunday 9am - 12pm
- Lisa Maffia, Sunday 12pm - 4pm (Reloaded Sunday with Lisa Maffia)
- Ras Kwame Sunday, 10pm - 1am (The Reggae Recipe)

Capital Xtra Cover Presenters:

- Indiyah Polack (Capital Xtra Breakfast cover for Shayna Marie)
- Andrew Mensah (Late night, afternoon, & weekend cover)
- Lesziah (Late night, overnights, early breakfast & weekday/weekend cover)
- Issra (Late night, overnights, early breakfast & weekday/weekend cover)

== Events ==
Between 2016 and 2025, Capital XTRA hosted a number of events to complement its radio broadcasts, including:

- Homegrown Live; an artist-led event which featured performances from UK talent at Koko, Camden. Previous performers include AJ Tracey, Aitch, Dappy, Hardy Caprio, Stefflon Don and WSTRN.

- Capital XTRA Upfront Live; was a live music event held on 26 September 2023 at KOKO, Camden. Hosted by Robert Bruce and Shayna Marie, it featured performances from Davido, NSG (group), Strandz, and Debbie, with DJ Manny Norté. The event also included a £1,000 prize giveaway for attendees.

- Capital XTRA Comedy Club; is an annual charity in support of Global’s Make Some Noise. Held at Lola’s at The Hippodrome in London, the shows feature top comedians and are hosted by Andrew Mensah. The 2024 and 2025 lineups included acts like Axel Blake, Babatunde Aléshé and Kae Kurd, with all proceeds supporting UK charities tackling issues like poverty and mental health.

== See also ==
- List of radio stations in the United Kingdom
