= Harriet Scott (broadcaster) =

English radio presenter (born 1972)

- Born: Harriet Scott; 23 January 1972 (age 54)
- Presenting career
- Station: Magic Radio
- Time slot: Weekdays 6 am – 10 am
- Stations: BRMB; Virgin Radio; Heart; Heart London
- Style: Presenter
- Country: United Kingdom

Harriet Scott (born 23 January 1972) is a British radio presenter with Magic Radio, presenting the Weekday Breakfast show.

== Career ==
After studying History at Hull University, Scott became a production assistant for BBC Radio Humberside. A move to GWR followed, after which she worked at a number of other stations, including Viking FM, 2-Ten FM, and BRMB in Birmingham.

It was while at BRMB in 1997 that she began to move into television, becoming the travel presenter for ITV Central in the West Midlands. She went on to spend several years at Virgin Radio.

In 2002, she joined Heart as a co-presenter of Heart Breakfast on Heart London alongside Jonathan Coleman. In February 2005 she was joined to co-present Heart Breakfast by Jamie Theakston who was replacing Coleman. The duo won a Sony Radio Silver Award for Best Entertainment Show and Radio Presenters of the Year at the Arqiva Commercial Radio Awards. Between April and July 2011 she was maternity cover for Emma Bunton on Heart each Saturday drivetime. On 30 November 2012 she left the station.

Scott made her debut on BBC London 94.9 sitting in for Simon Lederman on Sunday 2 December 2012, 10 pm to 2 am. and Ray Khan on the Overnight Show on Sunday 23 December 2012, 2 am to 6 am. In late December 2012 Scott was announced as the new early breakfast show presenter. On 7 January 2013 she began presenting Weekday Early Breakfast on the station and continued until January 2014 when James Max took over.

She has been a cover presenter on the same station for Vanessa Feltz on her mid-morning radio show, Penny Smith on the Breakfast Show, Joanne Good on the afternoon show and Gaby Roslin's Sunday late afternoon entertainment show, most recently in July 2014.

Scott made her debut on BBC Radio 2 on 1 March 2014 covering for Anneka Rice on the Saturday morning show and exactly a month later made her debut on BBC Three Counties Radio sitting in for Nick Coffer, 12 noon to 3 pm.

In June 2014, Scott presented on BBC Northampton sitting in twice on the Summer Saturday late afternoon show, 3 pm to 6 pm.

In 2015, she joined Magic Radio presenting Weekend Breakfast.

In September 2017, she began presenting Magic Breakfast on Magic Radio alongside Ronan Keating, running Monday to Fridays, 6 am to 10 am. Keating stepped down from the show in July 2024 with Scott continuing to present the show alongside a range of guest hosts until a permanent co-host was announced. In October 2024, it was announced that Gok Wan would be Scott's new permanent co-host from January 2025.

== Personal life ==
In 1998 Harriet was involved in a well-publicised affair with Mike Hollingsworth, who was married to TV presenter Anne Diamond at the time. She subsequently married David Bloom in 2009 and together they have two sons. However they are now divorced They lived in north London
