= BRMB =

British radio station

- Birmingham; United Kingdom
- Broadcast area: Birmingham
- Frequencies: FM: 89.1 MHz; DAB; Freeview: 277
- Branding: Birmingham's Original Station

Programming
- Language: English
- Format: Community Radio

Ownership
- Owner: Murfin Music International
- Sister stations: Big City Radio

History
- First air date: 19 February 1974 (original); 4 September 2023 (present)

Links
- Website: BRMB

BRMB (an abbreviation of Birmingham Broadcasting) is a British radio station based in Aston, Birmingham, which is owned and operated by Murfin Music International. It broadcasts on 89.1FM in Aston and surrounding areas, on DAB throughout Birmingham, and online via the station's website and mobile apps.

Originally launched on 19 February 1974, BRMB was one of the first Independent Local Radio stations to go on air in the UK. It was acquired by Capital Radio in 1993, and subsequently sold to Orion Media in 2008. Orion announced a rebrand of BRMB and its sister stations to Free Radio in 2012, and the BRMB name disappeared in March 2012 when it became Free Radio Birmingham.

On 17 August 2023, Ofcom gave approval for Big City Radio, a Birmingham-based community station, to relaunch as BRMB on 4 September 2023; Paul Young's "Come Back and Stay" was the first song to be played following the relaunch, and Jimmy Franks presented the first programme.

The original 1974 station launched the careers of many presenters who went on to become household names, both in the Midlands and beyond. Past presenters on BRMB include Les Ross, Tony Butler, Ed Doolan, Graham Torrington, Jeremy Kyle, Phil Upton, Caroline Martin and Elliott Webb. Butler is regarded as the inventor of the football phone-in, while Kyle went on to become a television presenter. BRMB also launched the Birmingham Walkathon, an event first staged in 1983 to raise money for charity, and which continues to be held to the present day.

== History ==
=== Original station: 1974–2012 ===
==== Early days ====
BRMB was first launched on 19 February 1974, on 261 metres medium wave, (1152kHz) and 94.8 MHz FM, and was based in Aston Road North at Radio House, a building previously used as television studios by ATV and ABC Weekend Television. BRMB was the fourth independent local commercial radio station to begin broadcasting in Britain, after LBC, Capital Radio and Radio Clyde. Broadcasting a mix of popular music with local news, live football coverage, information and specialist output, the station became popular amongst residents in Birmingham and later changed its main FM frequency from 94.8 to 96.4 in 1987.

The original station name, BRMB, was not an initialism (contrary to popular belief – some believed it stood for Birmingham Radio, Midlands Broadcasting). Instead, the original company, Birmingham Broadcasting Ltd., wanted something that combined a US-style call-sign with the company name – e.g. Birmingham – (BRM) and Broadcasting – (B); equalling BRMB.

In January 1978, BRMB began to advertise job vacancies available in the Birmingham area, doing so in association with the Job Centre in Erdington. The campaign won the support of John Goulding, the Minister for Employment at the time. In 1981, BRMB was approached by the spina bifida charity ASBAH and invited to join ATV in hosting a fundraising event in Birmingham's Chamberlain Square. The event, which featured appearances by Jasper Carrott and Noel Gordon, raised £82,000, and was considered to have been a huge success. BRMB were keen to hold other charity events after that, and in May 1983, staged the first Birmingham Walkathon. The walk, which took place around the city's Outer Circle bus route, saw around 24,000 participants raise £225,000 for Mencap. The Walkathon became an annual event until 1992, and has been staged sporadically since then.

==== Acquisition by Capital ====
In 1988, as a response to government disapproval of the simulcasting of programming on both FM and mediumwave, a sister station was launched on the 1152 kHz frequency. Xtra AM became BRMB's 'gold' service, playing classic hits, while BRMB itself began to cater for a younger audience. At this stage, BRMB was part of Midlands Radio plc, which was bought out along with Radio Trent, Leicester Sound and Mercia Sound by Capital Radio in 1993. However, they sold the other stations to the GWR Group whilst Capital kept hold of BRMB and Xtra AM. Xtra was on the air for nine years until the majority of its programming was switched to London, where it was simulcast with Capital Gold.

On 30 August 1993, and shortly after its acquisition by Capital Radio Group, BRMB held "Party in the Square", an event featuring a music concert in Birmingham's Centenary Square, which was attended by 23,000 people. Acts who participated in the event included Belinda Carlisle, Rick Astley, Lulu and Bad Boys Inc, and at the time it was the largest ever pop music event to be staged in Birmingham city centre. Although the event was deemed to be a success, police had concerns over safety, as well as the disruption closing the square would cause, so in 1995 the event was renamed "Party in the Park" and moved to the city's Cofton Park. It would later move to Cannon Hill Park and finally Alexander Stadium. "Party in the Park" would feature many well known singers and groups of the day, including the Spice Girls, Eternal, East 17, Hear'Say and Westlife. The 1998 event, titled "People's Party", was held on 16 May to coincide with the 24th G8 summit, which was held in Birmingham that year. Acts at the People's Party included Lionel Richie, All Saints, Louise and 5ive. A concert was also held on the same day at Symphony Hall to entertain world leaders, and broadcast to Cannon Hill Park via satellite link. The concert featured Mick Hucknall, Chris Rea and Jools Holland.

In January 1999, BRMB staged its "Two Strangers and a Wedding" competition in which contestants entered a competition to marry a complete stranger. The event attracted criticism from church leaders, including The Rt Rev Mark Santer, the Bishop of Birmingham, who accused BRMB of "reducing a sacred decision to a media event". The winners, Greg Cordell and Carla Germaine, were married in a Registry Office ceremony at Birmingham's Hyatt Hotel, before embarking on an all-expenses paid honeymoon in the Bahamas, and being given a year's free use of a car and luxury apartment on their return to the UK. The couple separated three months later. Germaine later met and married Jeremy Kyle, then a BRMB disc jockey. BRMB ran the competition again in 2006. Craig Cooper and Rebecca Duffy, the couple chosen to get married, separated four months later.

In April 2001, presenter Tim Shaw was investigated by the Radio Authority over a suicide caller hoax on his late night show, when he appeared to leave the studio in order to talk the caller out of jumping from a bridge. In August 2001, four participants in a competition where contestants were invited to sit on blocks of dry ice to win tickets to a music festival were taken to hospital with burns. Three of them were required to undergo skin graft surgery and have prolonged hospital stays. BRMB's parent company, Capital Media Group, was fined £15,000 over the incident following a hearing at Birmingham Magistrates' Court in January 2003. In October 2007, BRMB was criticised by media watchdog Ofcom for running a competition "in a manner designed to obscure the true nature of the prize" after they had invited listeners to enter a contest to watch the 2007 UEFA Champions League final in Athens in May of that year. The venue had turned out to be a Greek restaurant in Birmingham named Athens rather than the Greek capital, something Ofcom described as a "serious breach" of its broadcasting regulations.

In 1998, BRMB moved from its Aston premises to studios at Brindleyplace near Broad Street In Birmingham City Centre. In September 2004, Capital Radio Group and GWR Group agreed a merger plan that would give them a 36% of the radio market. The deal, worth £700m, was given approval by the Office of Fair Trading in December 2004. The matter was not referred to the Competition Commission after the newly created GCap Media agreed to sell Century 106 in Nottinghamshire.

==== The Orion Years ====
On 6 June 2008, GCap Media was acquired by Global Radio. The Office of Fair Trading subsequently referred the acquisition to the Competition Commission due to potential "conflict of interests" issues in the West Midlands (and in other areas). On 8 August 2008, Global announced that BRMB would be sold along with other West Midlands owned GCap/Global stations Mercia FM, Wyvern FM, Heart 106 and Beacon Radio. In May 2009, the station was sold officially to a company backed by Lloyds Development Capital and Phil Riley, himself a former BRMB presenter during the 1980s who later became chief executive of Chrysalis Radio. Riley's company was named Orion Media.

Orion brought in Paul Kaye as programme director, who had previously held that post at Wyvern FM, and who helped to facilitate a refresh in 2010, bringing back some of the features BRMB listeners had enjoyed in the past, such as late night talk shows, football coverage and the BRMB Walkathon. In November 2010, the station held BRMB Live, a music concert at Birmingham's LG Arena at which 14 acts were featured, including The Script, The Saturdays, Olly Murs, Alexandra Burke, James Blunt and The Wanted. The event returned for November 2011, with acts including Cher Lloyd, Matt Cardle, Ed Sheeran, JLS, Pixie Lott, and Emeli Sande.

On 9 January 2012, Orion Media announced that BRMB would be rebranded as Free Radio Birmingham, along with its sister West Midlands stations Beacon, Mercia and Wyvern. At the time, Riley cited the difficulty in promoting several individual radio stations as the reason for the name change, as well as the rebranding of rivals such as Heart and Smooth. The decision to rename the station, along with the choice of new name, were questioned by Dorothy Hobson, senior media lecturer at the University of Wolverhampton, who cited an almost 100% brand recognition for BRMB in the West Midlands area: "All radio is free, this is not newspapers or subscription digital TV...This feels very much like a decision made by a committee." The BRMB brand, together with neighbouring stations Mercia, Beacon and Wyvern, were phased out on Wednesday 21 March 2012 in preparation for the rebrand, which took place at 7pm on Monday 26 March 2012. At the time of its rebrand, RAJAR estimated that BRMB reached an average weekly audience of 359,000 listeners. Orion Media was acquired by Bauer Media in May 2016, while Phil Riley went on to launch Boom Radio in February 2021. In November 2021, Bauer announced that Free Radio Birmingham would be moving out of Brindleyplace to smaller studios at 54 Hagley Road. In January 2024, Bauer Media announced that Free Radio would rebrand to become part of the national Hits Radio network from April.

=== Relaunch: 2023 ===
Following the successful relaunch of Radio Wyvern in Worcester, producer Muff Murfin began planning a BRMB relaunch, and hired Paul Ellery, Wyvern's Programme Director, to help facilitate the project. On 17 August 2023, it was announced that the UK's media regulator, Ofcom, had given Big City Radio, a community station in Birmingham, approval to rebrand as BRMB. The station, which relaunched on 4 September 2023 at 11.52am, broadcasts on Big City Radio's 89.1FM frequency, as well as on DAB in Birmingham, while Big City Radio continued as an online station. Andy Street, the Mayor of the West Midlands, took part in BRMB's first show following its relaunch, appearing alongside Les Ross. The opening programme was presented by Jimmy Franks, with the first song to be played following the relaunch being "Come Back and Stay" by Paul Young. In February 2024, Jimmy Franks also presented a special programme to mark the 50th anniversary of BRMB's original launch. He was joined by former breakfast show presenter Suzi Becker.

== Notable presenters ==
Presenters such as Les Ross, Tony Butler, Ed Doolan, Graham Torrington, Jeremy Kyle, Phil Upton, Caroline Martin and Elliott Webb became regulars on the station. Les Ross was the UK's longest-serving breakfast show presenter, presenting BRMB's flagship weekday breakfast show from March 1976 to March 1989, followed by a second stint between August 1993 to September 2002. He was succeeded by Elliott Webb, who presented the show from 2002 to 2007. Webb was joined by Caroline Martin, who co-presented with him from 2006, then presented the show herself following his departure. Later breakfast show presenters included Jo Russell, who joined from Absolute Radio in late 2009 to present The Jo Show on weekday mornings, followed by John Fox and Giuliano Casadei, known as Foxy & Giuliano, who moved from drivetime to present the breakfast show in 2010, and continued to present the show following the rebrand to Free Radio. Giuliano left Free Radio Breakfast in May 2016, and Foxy in November 2016.

Robin Valk was the station's head of music. He and John Slater presented programmes on BRMB, in which they promoted local music.

Sports broadcaster Tony Butler is regarded as the inventor of the football phone-in, presenting the format several years before it appeared on stations such as Talksport and BBC Radio 5 Live, while former heads of sport George Gavin and Tom Ross also found fame on the station when it began broadcasting live commentary of West Midlands football matches every Saturday afternoon. Ian Crocker was also involved in the coverage early on.

Brian Savin had several roles at BRMB, including as a presenter, producer, Head of Music, and Deputy Programme Controller; he was also Head of Creative Services for ten years and went on to launch Saga 105.7FM in 2001. An infamous row between Savin and Tony Butler led to Butler being sacked from the station in 1984 after he was alleged to have grabbed Savin around the neck during the argument.

Jenny Wilkes joined BRMB from university to present a youth magazine programme, before moving to BBC Radio WM in 1982, where she presented a long-running Soul and Motown show, as well as working on Midlands Today. Graham Torrington joined BRMB in the 1980s, and went on to present shows at a number of other radio stations, mostly as a late night presenter playing love songs. Andy Hollins and Brendan Kearney presented a Sunday morning show during the early 1990s. The programme made news headlines in December 1991 after the pair were heard to storm out of the studio following an on-air row which erupted during a review of the year. Margherita Taylor joined BRMB after winning a talent search for a new presenter. Television presenter Jeremy Kyle (known to listeners as Jezza) was also a disc jockey on BRMB, joining in 1997 to present a late night agony uncle-style phone-in after sending the station a demo tape. The show was a success and led to him presenting Jezza's Virgin Confessions, a similar programme airing throughout the UK on Virgin Radio.

Phil Upton did two stints as a BRMB presenter, starting in the 1990s while studying at the University of Central England, then again in 2003 following some time with Heart. Harriet Scott, who co-presented Heart Breakfast for a decade, presented a show for BRMB before being offered the role of drivetime presenter on Virgin Radio by its then owner, Chris Evans. Comedian Graham Mack presented a show on BRMB, but walked out in 2001 following an on air argument with his producer, Adam Bridge, over the Eminem track "Stan", which Mack did not want to play because the artist was on probation at the time for possession of a concealed weapon. Comedian Tom Binns worked for BRMB during the 2000s, but was sacked in December 2009 after interrupting the broadcast of that year's Queen's Speech to tell listeners "Two words: Bor-ing".

Among the presenters to appear on the relaunched BRMB is former BBC presenter Bob Brolly, who joined in October 2023 to present Bob Brolly's Irish Show on Sunday afternoons. During the same month it was also announced BRMB planned to hire a number of other former BBC Local Radio presenters, including Jimmy Franks, once the BRMB's "flying eye" traffic reporter who later worked at BBC Radio WM, who would join initially to present a show on Saturday lunchtimes, and Ryan Kennedy, a former Beacon Radio breakfast presenter who later worked for BBC Radio Shropshire, who would join the weekend presenting team. Birmingham actor Andre Stewart Daniel would also join to present a soul vibes and R&B show on Friday and Saturday evenings. In August 2024, BRMB announced that Les Ross would relaunch his breakfast show, Les Ross in the Morning, on weekdays from late September. On 1 November 2024, Prince Akwasi, a former radio personality from Ghana, joined BRMB to present a soul and R'n'B show on Friday nights, having secured the job after visiting the station and expressing his admiration for Les Ross.

== Features ==
In October 2024, BRMB produced A Space to Speak Your Mind, a programme for broadcast on 10 October to coincide with World Mental Health Day. The programme, which highlights the help and support available for those experiencing mental health issues, was produced in association with Birmingham Mind, and also released as a podcast.

== Criticism ==
On 6 October 2025, Ofcom found BRMB in breach of its broadcasting licence for not airing enough content reflecting the ethnic communities of the Aston area. The finding came after Ofcom listened to a week of programming from June 2025. In response, BRMB said its output reflects the diversity of the community it serves.
