= Anthony Lawrence (journalist) =

British journalist (1912–2013)

- Born: Anthony John Lawrence; 12 August 1912; Wimbledon, England
- Died: 24 September 2013 (aged 101); Hong Kong
- Occupation: Journalist
- Notable credit: Chief News Correspondent for BBC News
- Title: OBE
- Spouses: Sylvia; Irmgard Noll
- Children: 1

Anthony John Lawrence, OBE (12 August 1912 – 24 September 2013) was a British journalist. His most high-profile role was that of chief Far East correspondent for BBC Radio during the Vietnam War. He died in Hong Kong on 24 September 2013.

== Early life ==
Lawrence was born in Wimbledon, London, the fourth of five children. Lawrence described his primary school as being "in a rough neighbourhood" where the headmaster periodically had to make appeals for shoes to give some of the poorer pupils, who would otherwise come to school barefoot. He later attended King's College School. Lawrence believed journalism was in his blood, with an uncle and his grandfather both having worked in newspapers, and following on secondary school he worked for a variety of London weeklies.

He served in World War II in the British Army, in the Royal Artillery in Europe, where he achieved the rank of captain. He was later assigned to the British Forces' Information Control Unit in Germany.

== Journalism career ==
Lawrence claimed to have been inspired to enter journalism by his "wicked uncle" Arthur Lawrence, a successful journalist, editor and author, and Diplomatic Correspondent of the Daily Mail. Lawrence began his career in journalism with local newspapers before the interruption of World War II. In Germany at the end of the war in 1945, his career was renewed first when he was involved in the launch of Die Zeit, and later when he joined the BBC World Service in London in 1945. He was posted to Singapore as the BBC Radio Far East correspondent in 1956, and was then transferred to Hong Kong in 1958. The Radio Times referred to him as "a BBC man of the old school: courtly, cultured, gentle, polite.”

During his period with the BBC, Lawrence was involved with two documentaries, "Born Chinese" and "From Our Correspondent". He remained with the service until 1973, and continued after this with the occasional contribution, including BBC World Service live coverage of the ceremony of Hong Kong's transition from British to Chinese rule in 1997. He was interviewed in 1972 on the BBC radio programme Desert Island Discs by Roy Plomley. Toward the end of his news career he wrote his first book, Foreign Correspondent.

== Family life ==
Lawrence lost his first wife, Sylvia, who was expecting their first child, while she was in a hostel for expectant mothers. This was during the Second World War, and the building received a direct hit in an air raid; she had ironically gone there for fear of the raids.

Lawrence married a German woman, Irmgard Noll, in 1946, and frequently referred in interviews to the importance of his second wife's support and assistance during his career in the Far East. His son Alex, aged 8 at the time of his move to Singapore, was "bribed" to accept the transition with the offer of a pet monkey. On their move to Hong Kong, Alex had to be sent to boarding school in England. Lawrence outlived both his wife Irmgard (who died in 2001) and son Alex.

== Retirement ==
Lawrence retired to Hong Kong, and continued to be active, including authorship of several more books. His activities included a period as President of the Foreign Correspondents' Club, and involvement as a volunteer with the International Social Service[], where he became chairman in 1988, and which has a refuge named after him. Lawrence was active in support for education programmes for Vietnamese refugee children detained in Hong Kong, and also urged the authorities to action in reuniting immigrant families from Mainland China.

Lawrence was awarded an OBE in the 2013 New Year Honours List for services to the community in Hong Kong. He turned 100 in August 2012.

== Works ==
- Foreign Correspondent, autobiography published by George Allen & Unwin, 1972, ISBN 0-04-915022-7
- "China: in Farbe”, Sudwest, 1980, ISBN 3-517-00731-5
- ”The Love of China”, Crown, 1980, ISBN 0-517-28796-X
- China: the long march, published by Knapp, 1986, ISBN 0-7924-4141-9 (with Brian Brake)
- ”The Fragrant Chinese”, published by The Chinese University Press, 1993, ISBN 962-201-572-7.
