= VERY TV =

- Country: Thailand
- Broadcast area: Thailand
- Headquarters: Bangkok, Thailand

Ownership
- Owner: VERY ENTERTAINMENT

History
- Launched: 16 May 2011; 14 years ago

Links
- Website: http://very.co.th/

VERY TV is a 24-hour music and entertainment channel owned by VERY ENTERTAINMENT. On air on TrueVisions Channel 64 and 79. The channel originally started its broadcast on May 16, 2011. VERY TV reaches an audience of 8 million viewers in Thailand.

== List of programs ==
- U Made
- Teen Circle
- On-air Live
- VRZO
