= Big City Radio =

89.1FM Big City Radio
- England

Technical information
- Transmitter coordinates: 52.5013°N 1.8882°W

Big City Radio (formerly Aston FM) is a British community radio station based in Aston, Birmingham. The station, owned and operated by Murfin Music International, broadcasts from Aston and surrounding areas, on DAB+ and online via the station's website and mobile apps.

The station launched on 3 September 2007 as Aston FM, later rebranding as Big City Radio.

In November 2017 Big City Radio changed its mainstream output from classic contemporary music to 'Urban' and 'Specialised' programming.

In September 2022, the station began to tease a relaunch of the former Birmingham ILR brand BRMB on its website and social media. On 17 August 2023, it was announced that the UK's media regulator, Ofcom, had given Big City Radio approval to rebrand as BRMB. The station, which would relaunch on 4 September 2023 at 11.52am, was to broadcast on Big City Radio's 89.1FM frequency, as well as on DAB in Birmingham, while Big City Radio continued as an online station. Andy Street, the Mayor of the West Midlands, was scheduled to take part in BRMB's first show following its relaunch.

On 20 March 2024, it was reported that Ofcom had fined Big City Radio £1,200 after finding it in breach of its Key Commitments for not broadcasting enough local content, including news, travel, weather, community information and sport. The findings related to the pre-BRMB station, and followed an investigation after Ofcom received a complaint about Big City Radio's output.

== Notable presenters ==
Notable past presenters at the station include long-established West Midlands radio personality Les Ross who hosted Big City's breakfast show for four months from December 2009. He later returned to present a Sunday afternoon show for the station.
