= Graham Torrington =

British DJ (born 1960)

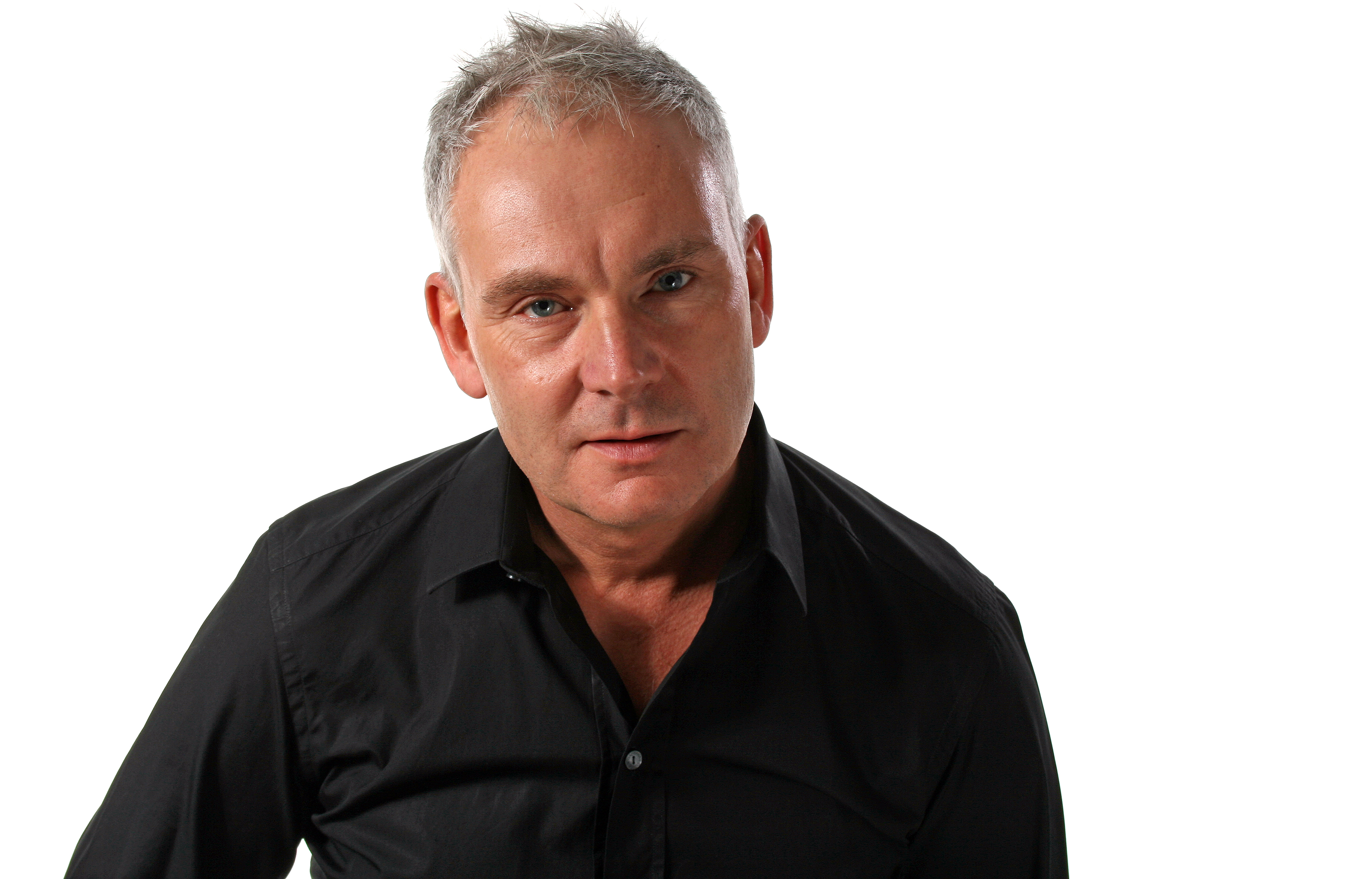
- Born: 1960 (age 65–66); Birmingham, England
- Presenting career
- Style: Talk radio
- Country: United Kingdom
- Website: www.boomradiouk.com/graham-torrington/

Graham Torrington (born 1960) is a British radio presenter and broadcaster.

== Radio work ==
=== Romantica ===
After starting out as a hospital radio presenter, Torrington joined Birmingham's BRMB in the 1980s to cover an overnight programme for Steve Dennis. He was with the station for several years during the late 1980s and early 1990s, and through most of his tenure there presented a late night programme of love songs called Romantica. The show had previously been hosted by Charley Neal, who went on to become a weather presenter at Central Television. Torrington presented the programme on Saturdays for a while after Neal, but moved to host the station's lunchtime show in 1989, as well as a Sunday morning programme. Romantica was presented by Nick Hennigan for a while, but the show was relaunched with Torrington in 1990 and aired on Sunday evenings. Romantica used an instrumental version of Luther Vandross's Any Love as its opening theme tune. Torrington continued his weekday presenting, moving to the Drivetime show, then in 1992 he started hosting a late night show from Mondays to Thursdays. This programme contained a love songs strand titled The Love Zone. Torrington left the station in 1993 after its acquisition by the Capital Radio Group when he and several other presenters were axed by incoming managing director Richard Park. He moved to Buzz FM, taking Romantica with him, and he was made the station's Programme Controller. He later launched Kix 96 in Coventry.

=== Late Night Love ===
The majority of Torrington's radio career has been within the commercial radio industry. Presenting on stations such as BRMB and more recently on Global Radio (formerly GCap Media's) The One Network where Torrington presented the nightly relationship show, Graham Torrington's Late Night Love for 12 years. The show regularly attracted more than 1 million listeners across the UK on 41 radio stations and earned Torrington a Sony Radio Academy Award and the award for "Best Talk Show Host" at the New York Radio Festival Awards in 2008. Following Torrington's move to the BBC, fans of Late Night Love campaigned for him to return to late night radio, which prompted Torrington to start producing a weekly podcast version of the show.

Late Night Love made a brief return to radio in 2012 when Torrington joined Smooth Radio to present the programme on Sunday evenings. The programme began in January 2012 and aired for three months.

The show is now broadcast on Berkshire and North Hampshire's Glow Radio

=== BBC Radio ===
Torrington joined BBC Radio Bristol in 2008, and hosted the mid-morning talk-based radio programme on BBC Radio Bristol from 2009 to 2011. In May 2010 Graham Torrington's Late Night Relationship Show, which was a new take on the previous "Late Night Love" broadcast on Global Radio (formerly GCap Media's) The One Network, returned to BBC local radio in the West Country. The show was broadcast across seven BBC radio stations BBC Devon, BBC Cornwall, BBC Bristol, BBC Somerset, BBC Wiltshire, BBC Gloucestershire, BBC Jersey and BBC Guernsey between 10 pm and 1 am on Saturday and Sunday nights.

Following his time with Smooth Radio in early 2012 Torrington joined Birmingham's BBC Radio WM as a presenter, hosting a late night weekday programme of music and conversation from 16 April 2012. He also returned to BBC Devon to present Graham Torrington's Late Night Love Songs, a programme syndicated to stations across the West Country on Saturday and Sunday evenings. From Sunday 14 October 2012 till Thursday 29 October 2020, he has presented a late night programme called Late Night Graham Torrington on BBC Radio WM and BBC CWR airing from Sunday to Thursday nights. BBC Hereford and Worcester, BBC Radio Stoke and BBC Radio Shropshire have also aired the show since January 2013. From May 2015 the show was also extended to broadcast on BBC Radio Nottingham, BBC Radio Leicester and BBC Radio Derby. Torrington's last show for the BBC was aired on 29 October 2020.

Other Radio Work

September 2017 joined Super Yacht Radio to voice track an evening show

From studios in Palma De Mallorca to the Global Super Yacht Community

In February 2021 he joined Boom Radio broadcasting from his home in Catalonia, Spain.

On 15 August 2022 it was confirmed he would join North Derbyshire Radio to cover Late Night Love for three weeks while regular presenter Richard Spinks was away. From 3 October 2022 he joined MKFM in Milton Keynes to present Late Night Graham Torrington from Sundays to Thursdays, with MKFM planning to syndicate the show at a later date. He also continues to present on Boom Radio on Fridays and Saturdays.

== Television work ==
Torrington's TV work includes appearances on national gaming TV channel Gala TV and as host of Looking For Love, which aired on ITV's Meridian and Anglia TV regions.

== Awards ==
- World Medal – New York Festival Radio Programming Awards (2000)
- Silver Sony Award (2002)
- Best Regional Programme – Royal TV Society Awards (2002)
- Best Talk Show Host – New York Festival Radio Programming Awards (2008)
- Best Radio Personality (Network/Syndicated) – New York Festival Radio Awards (2018)
