= Two Strangers and a Wedding =

Radio competition

The Two Strangers and a Wedding logo as found at the website.

Two Strangers and a Wedding is a radio competition created and first hosted in Australia.

In order to win the competition, two contestants who have not met or made contact with each other must be chosen by the station's listeners. They then have to get married legitimately to win prizes.

== Australian competitions ==
The first promotions were held in Adelaide and Sydney, Australia on 2Day FM and SAFM and then on several other Australian stations in 1998. The couple involved in the 1998 SAFM Adelaide competition (James, Paul and Amanda) were Thomas Balacco and Helen Boyer, who soon split after three days on their honeymoon in Bali. It was reported that Helen had an affair with local TV show Today Tonight's reporter whilst in Bali covering the honeymoon story for Channel 7. Thomas Balacco who lived at West Beach, employed as an electrician, was media dubbed "Adelaide's Most Eligible", later met Valeska Farrow in 1999 and married in March 2001. The couple have 1 son and 1 daughter.

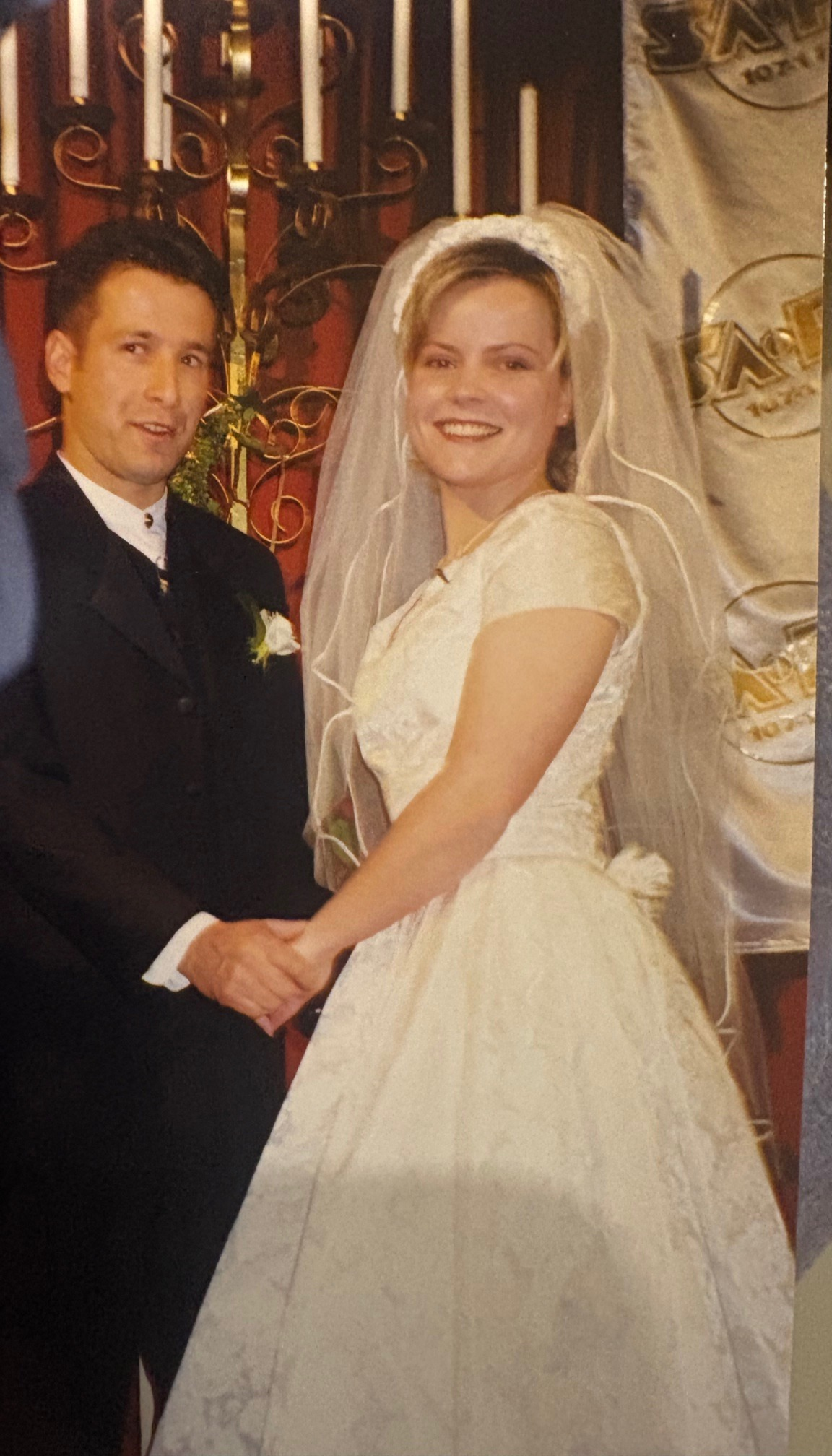
SAFM Thomas + Helen

The couple involved in the two-day FM promotion were Glenn Emerton and Lief Bunyan. Glenn Emerton later met Naomi Kennedy and married in March 2006.

== UK competitions ==
Birmingham radio station BRMB has married two sets of couples, and both of these contests have sparked a national interest. In 1999, the first couple were matched by a panel of relationship counsellors and astrologers, including astrologer Russell Grant. The groom was 28-year-old Greg Cordell, a sales manager, and his chosen bride was Carla Germaine, a 23-year-old former model. Also to make it to the last four girls was her long-term schoolfriend Joanna Scragg who later married successful banker Rob Cook.

The couple married, on air nationally and online; however, they split soon after the wedding. Carla later met and married Jeremy Kyle, who at the time was one of the radio station's DJs. They have 2 daughters and a son together. It was announced in September 2015 that they have since separated.

Later on in 2006, another couple were married. Again, the station received national interest. Becky, 28, and Craig, 30, were chosen for the stunt. Despite protests against the wedding, the two were married. The couple flew to Bermuda the day after the wedding for their honeymoon.

Four months later on 7 May 2006, the News of the World reported the couple had split, but not divorced. These reports were confirmed on the morning radio show The Big Brum Breakfast, when Becky (the bride) was interviewed.

== New Zealand competitions ==
New Zealand radio station The Edge ran a similar competition where they married Zane Nichol and Paula Stockwell in 1999, they now have two sons and a daughter.

In 2003, The Edge also married Steve Veix and Kersha Taylor. Again, the two are also still together and have a son, Mitchell. In early 2006, it was revealed that due to Steve's long days working on the couple's farm, Kersha suffered post-natal depression which she has since beaten. On Wednesday 16 January 2008, Kersha gave birth to their second son Finn.

The Edge ran 3 Strangers and a Wedding in 2007 where the bride has to pick which man out of 2 she will marry on the actual wedding day. Chantelle Swanson picked Paul Court as her groom on 27 September 2007 in Auckland, New Zealand. In March 2010 Chantelle gave birth to the couple's first child Taylor Thomas Court on Sunday 7 March 2010. He weighed 8 pounds, 12 ounces.

== Other competitions ==
95.5 WPLJ, a New York radio station, in 2006 married a couple. They were together for six months before divorcing.

Similar contests have been run in Los Angeles, Budapest, Hungary and in Estonia. 95.5 KLOS in Los Angeles also ran, a variant of the competition called "Three Strangers and a Wedding" in 2007, this time the twist was that the Bride had to choose her groom in 60 seconds based on first looks. The couple split up after 1 week. She has a nickname of the Naughty Nurse.

Most recently WTMX in Chicago ran 2 Strangers – Is Love Blind and the final couple refused to get married at the altar claiming marriage was too serious to be entered into via a radio competition.

The two most successful European 'social experiments' were held in Dublin on 98FM where the final couple are still together and have a child and in Budapest, Hungary where the couple from Danubius Radio are now media celebrities attending chat shows and film premieres.

More recently '2 Strangers' has also run successfully in on the WIL Cornbread show in St Louis, Energy FM on Calgary & and Kaya FM Johannesburg.

In Sept/Oct of 2008, Energy 101.5 of Calgary, Alberta, Canada ran Two Strangers and A Wedding. The Bride and Groom were to get married the last week of October. At the altar they opted out of marriage. They were to go on a date after the wedding and also spent a weekend with his family. No new info has been given since then.

In February 2009, a contest was launched by Waterford regional station Beat 102-103. There were 85 entrants, with the winners meeting minutes before the ceremony in April. The ceremony was legally void, since three months' notice is required. However, provision was made for a future legal ceremony and use of a shared house. The couple went to Portugal for a week's "honeymoon", accompanied by station staff. Upon their return, they split up, with the "bride" commenting, "I'm definitely not going to see him again."

== 2 Strangers TV ==
Strangers over the years has appeared on TV many times.

- Channel 9 Australia 1998
- BBC TV News, ITV TV News, SKY News & Have I Got News for You February 1999
- ITV '2 Strangers & a Wedding' two-episode special 2 March 1999
- TV3 Ireland '2 Strangers & a Wedding' Special
- RTL TV Hungary & TV2 Hungary 2004
- ABC TV America 2007 & CBS TV coverage 2007

The TV format of 2 Strangers and a Wedding is represented internationally by Small World International Format Television LLC and was showcased at international content market MipTV in 2009.

== Criticisms and controversy ==
- Birmingham's Churches Together accused BRMB of "reducing a sacred and momentous decision to a media event", before the 1999 wedding of Greg and Carla.
