= Norman de Mesquita =

British sports journalist and broadcaster

Samuel Norman Bueno de Mesquita (28 January 1932 – 25 July 2013) was a British sports journalist and broadcaster who specialized in the coverage of cricket and ice hockey. De Mesquita spearheaded the growth of ice hockey in the United Kingdom during the 1950s. From c. 1972 until 1975 de Mesquita produced and presented a seasonal BBC Radio London series titled The Play's the Thing, a fortnightly review of London's amateur theatre scene.

He was educated at Christ’s College, Finchley and after National Service in the RAF he worked in various jobs including sales and advertising before his passion for sport took over. His appetite for cricket was stirred by attending the Victory Test at Lord's in 1945, and he watched at least one day of every Lord's Test from then until his death. He also became involved in ice hockey after going to a match at Wembley's Empire Pool in 1946, going on to become a referee. He was Wembley's announcer for ice hockey and snooker.

In 1970 de Mesquita joined the newly formed BBC Radio London, becoming sports editor. He was included in the BBC Radio commentary team for the 1979 Prudential World Cup. From 1973 to 2000 he wrote for The Times on cricket, football and ice hockey, and in more recent years was an ever-present in the Lord's media centre as Wisden's Middlesex correspondent.

In 1999, he suffered a brain infection which left him unable to speak. After months of speech therapy, he made a partial recovery, but he never regained the clarity that made him such a good broadcaster and announcer.
