= Xtra AM =

Former British radio station

Birmingham and Coventry; England
- Frequencies: 1152 kHz in Birmingham; 1359 kHz in Coventry

Programming
- Format: Oldies

Ownership
- Owner: Midlands Radio plc

History
- First air date: 4 April 1989
- Last air date: 1993 in Coventry, April 1998 in Birmingham

Xtra AM was an Independent Local Radio station which was on the air between 1989 and 1998. It was broadcast to much of Birmingham, Coventry and Warwickshire and was the 'oldies' station which took over the mediumwave frequencies of both BRMB (serving Birmingham) and Mercia FM (Coventry and Warwickshire). The programming came from the BRMB studios in Aston, Birmingham, and the signal was relayed from the Langley Mill transmitter (Birmingham) and Shilton (Coventry). The Coventry station was acquired in 1993 by GWR Group and replaced by Classic Gold, while the Birmingham station continued until 1998 when it was replaced by Capital Gold.

== History ==
The station was launched on the morning of 4 April 1989, as a response to government disapproval of the simulcasting of programming on FM and medium wave. Xtra AM became a 'gold' station and targeted listeners in the 35 to 50 age range, while BRMB and Mercia both began to cater for a younger audience. The new AM service was launched to much fanfare with its inaugural host, Les Ross, conducting a spoof interview with Elvis Presley as part of its publicity.

Xtra AM quickly became popular with its audience and was soon rivalling its FM counterparts. Despite this, however, BRMB maintained the larger proportion of the audience share. One of the key ingredients in this success was the appointment of Les Ross as the station's breakfast host: a well liked and respected broadcaster in the region, when Ross left BRMB to move to Xtra AM, he took many of his listeners with him. He remained with the station for four years, before making a return to BRMB following a programming shake-up in 1993.

As well as playing what it termed 'classic hits', Xtra AM also carried a mini playlist of 12 songs from the current Top 40 which were deemed to fit with its music profile. Regional news, weather, events and community information, as well as local advertising were separate for the Birmingham and Coventry areas, but programming was simulcast in both areas. BRMB's well respected sports coverage was moved over to the new station, where Tom Ross continued to cover the region's sports events.

Presenters on the station included many who were already established personalities in the West Midlands region. During Xtra AM's nine years on air, besides Ross, these included Annie Othen, Ted Elliott, Tony Butler, Adrian Stewart, Dave Hickman, Mick Wright, Guy Jogoo and Noddy Holder (who hosted a popular Sunday afternoon show playing music from the 1970s). Jimmy Savile was also heard on the station, presenting a syndicated oldies show (also taken by a number of other commercial stations) based on his previous BBC Radio 1 show. Mike Hollis had been on BRMB before going to Radio Luxembourg and returned to Xtra AM after Luxembourg's English service closed and David Hamilton was also heard on the station.

== Closure ==
Capital Radio acquired Midlands Radio plc in 1993, and then decided to sell off the majority of the stations that belonged to the group. Capital retained BRMB, but Mercia FM was included in those to be sold. Consequently, the two Xtra AM frequencies experienced a parting of the ways. GWR Group purchased the Coventry station and as a result it was announced that Xtra AM in Coventry was to close, with the 1359 kHz frequency joining the Classic Gold Network. Xtra AM continued in Birmingham, however, on 1152 kHz, and the presenters urged Coventry listeners to retune to that frequency; this contributed to GWR pulling the plug on Xtra AM using 1359, earlier than provisionally agreed.

With the 1994 launch of 100.7 Heart FM, listeners were given greater choice, while the quality of broadcasting on the FM services was preferable to the poor reception often experienced on the mediumwave band. Ratings for Xtra AM gradually fell throughout the mid-1990s before the end finally came in April 1998. The majority of the Xtra AM team were made redundant, the station renamed Capital Gold Birmingham, and the bulk of programming was switched to London and simulcast from Capital Gold. The only local programming to remain was a four-hour afternoon show and Tom Ross's sports coverage.

On 3 August 2007, the station, along with the rest of the Capital Gold network, was replaced by a new network called simply Gold, the result of the merger of the Classic Gold and Capital Gold networks under one owner, GCap Media.
