= Radio Wyvern =

Radio station in Worcester, England

Coordinates: 52.1940°N 2.1945°W

- Worcester; England
- Broadcast area: Herefordshire and Worcestershire
- Frequencies: FM: 106.7 MHz; DAB: 12A; Freeview: 277
- RDS: WYVERN

Programming
- Format: CHR

Ownership
- Owner: Youth Community Media
- Sister stations: Wyvern Timeless Classics

History
- First air date: 13 January 2008 (18 years ago)

Links
- Website: www.radiowyvern.co.uk

Radio Wyvern, formerly 106.7 Youthcomm Radio, is a community radio station, licensed by Ofcom, broadcasting to Worcester, England, on 106.7FM, DAB Digital Radio in Herefordshire and Worcestershire, and online.

Youthcomm Radio was established in 1996, and officially launched its FM service on Sunday 13 January 2008 after broadcasting online for seven years prior. Initially established by Worcestershire County Council and Worcestershire Youth Service, the station later fell victim to funding cuts and was at the brink of closure in early 2018. However Muff Murfin was called to take over control of the station.

In 2019, Ofcom granted many community radio stations across the UK permission for the installation of extra transmitters or coverage improvements to existing transmitters. Youthcomm Radio was given clearance for an increase of transmitter power, and transmitting equipment upgrades to improve the coverage of the 106.7FM service.

== Programming ==
Wyvern broadcasts from purpose built studios above the former Youth Centre in Swanpool Walk in the Saint Johns area of Worcester, with their transmitter located on the top of a local Primary School. Due to the elevated location of the transmitter, this provides a large coverage area, spanning across the county of Worcestershire and beyond.

The station plays a mix of music, mainly consisting of chart pop hits, dance and RnB. They also play popular hits from the past 30 years as part of their "Throwbacks" selection, which is usually broadcast between 9 and 10AM on the Owen Lowe breakfast show, and from 6PM on weekend evenings.

An hourly news, weather and sports bulletin is provided by Radio News Hub with local news bulletins written and provided locally by Shaun Moore.
