= Les Ross =

British radio DJ (born 1949)

Les Ross MBE
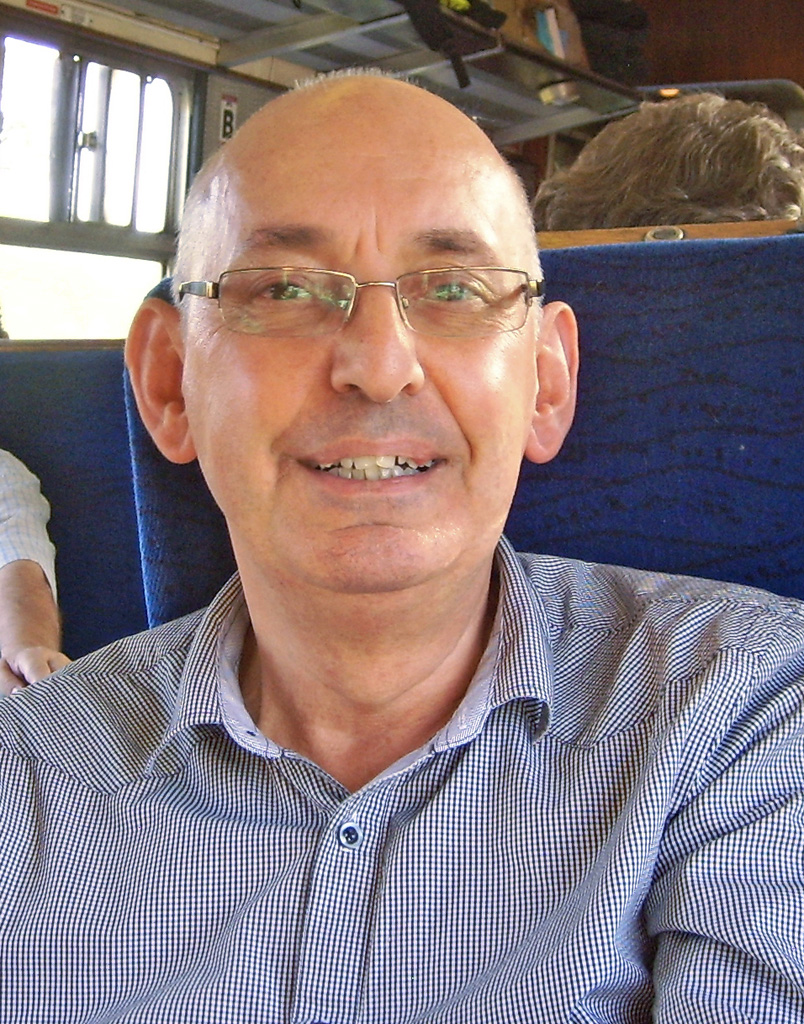
- Ross in 2011
- Born: Birmingham, UK
- Presenting career
- Show: Boom Radio
- Stations: Previously BBC Radio WM, BBC Radio Tees, BRMB
- Style: Radio presenter
- Country: United Kingdom

Leslie Ross MBE (né Meakin; born 7 February 1949) is a British disc jockey in the West Midlands. He currently presents radio programmes on BRMB and Boom Radio.

== Early life ==
Born in Birmingham, Ross wanted to be a DJ writing to the general manager of Radio Luxembourg at age 11.

He attended King Edward VI Aston School in Aston, Birmingham and left with 10 O Levels. His first job after school was at IBM, but he left after one year. His next job was as a clerk at Witton Cemetery.

At age 17, Ross won a DJ competition run by the Birmingham Evening Mail, defeating Johnnie Walker, who was the runner-up.

== Career ==
=== BBC Radio WM ===
In 1970 Ross joined BBC Radio Birmingham (which became BBC Radio WM in 1980), presenting a 90-minute Saturday morning show with John Henry called "The Ross and Henry Show". The show's format included a studio audience and interactive elements, competitions and phone-in requests.

The breakfast show, entitled "On the Move", was unique at the BBC at the time, due to its early 5am start time. The BBC national networks did not start broadcasting until 6am, making Ross the only presenter on the air in the UK during that hour. The Radio Birmingham transmitter at 5.5 kW was the most powerful local radio transmitter in the country located at Sutton Coldfield.

=== Radio Tees and BRMB ===
In 1974, Ross's initial application to BRMB was rejected and he subsequently joined Radio Tees in the Northeast of England presenting their breakfast show in the summer of 1975. Ross also presented a Saturday morning music show with record librarian Wincey Willis as co-presenter. In March 1976, Ross returned to Birmingham and joined BRMB, taking over the breakfast show from Adrian Juste, who had left to join BBC Radio 1.

Ross won many awards, including 'Independent Radio Personality of the Year Award' in 1986, and in 1997 he received a Sony Award for an outstanding contribution to radio. He was appointed Member of the Most Excellent Order of the British Empire (MBE) in the 1996 Birthday Honours for services to radio broadcasting.

=== Revolver ===
Ross also co-hosted Revolver, a British music series made by ATV in Birmingham that ran for eight episodes on the ITV network in 1978, alongside Peter Cook.

=== Xtra AM and return to BRMB ===
With the launch of sister station Xtra AM in 1989, Ross moved on to present there for four years. In August 1993, Ross returned to BRMB to host the Breakfast show. After 26 years of broadcasting, on Friday 27 September 2002, Ross presented his final BRMB Breakfast show, live from Birmingham International station. As 9 o'clock approached, he boarded a Virgin Trains West Coast train hauled by electric locomotive no. 86259 especially named 'Les Ross' to mark the end of his BRMB radio career.

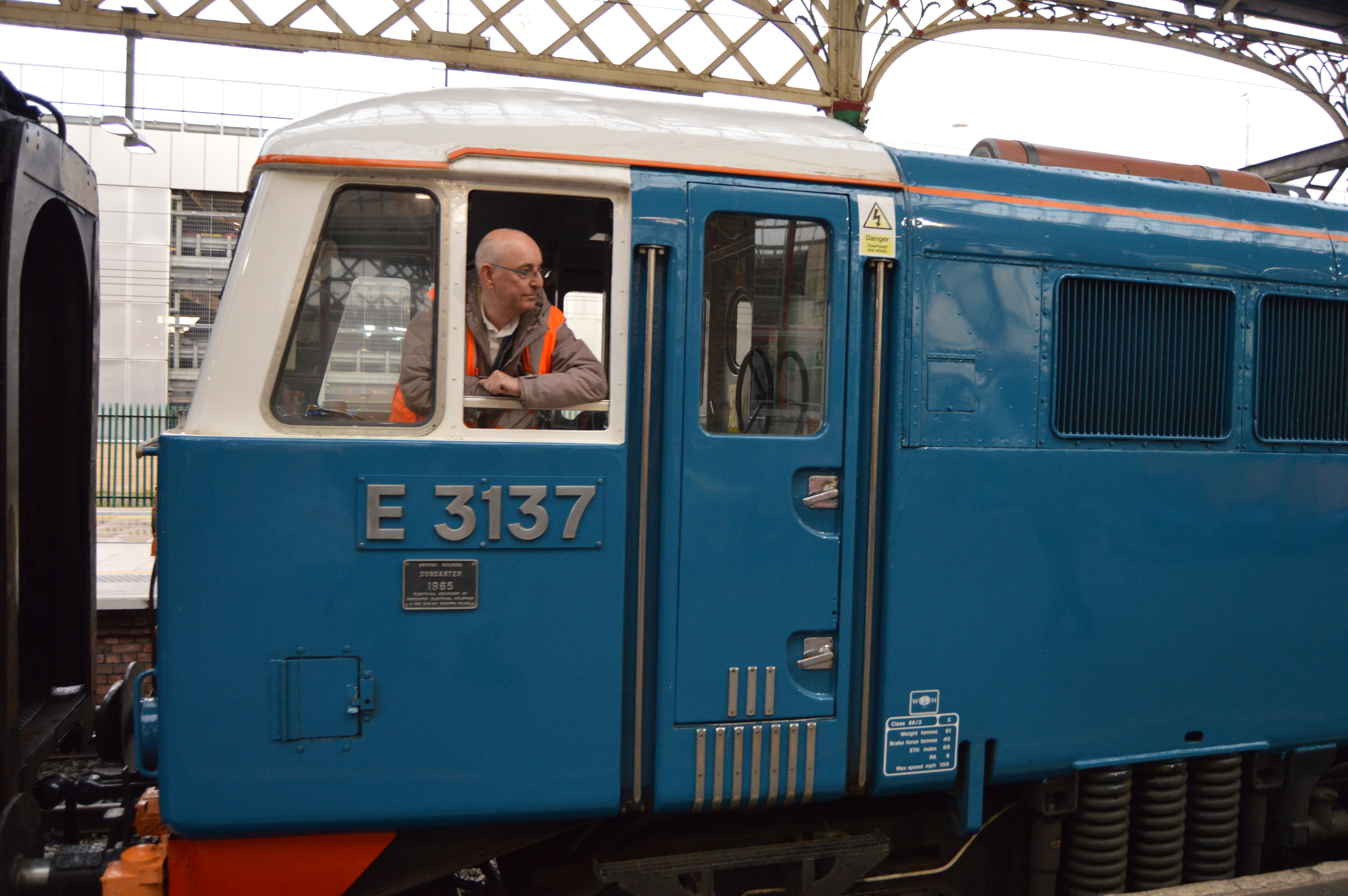
Les Ross looking out of the rear cab onboard his namesake locomotive no 86259 "Les Ross"

He later purchased and preserved this locomotive in operational condition following its retirement from regular passenger service. Locomotive 86259 has been returned to mainline use and sees use on various rail tours, painted in its original 1960s British Rail electric blue livery.

=== Saga 105.7 ===
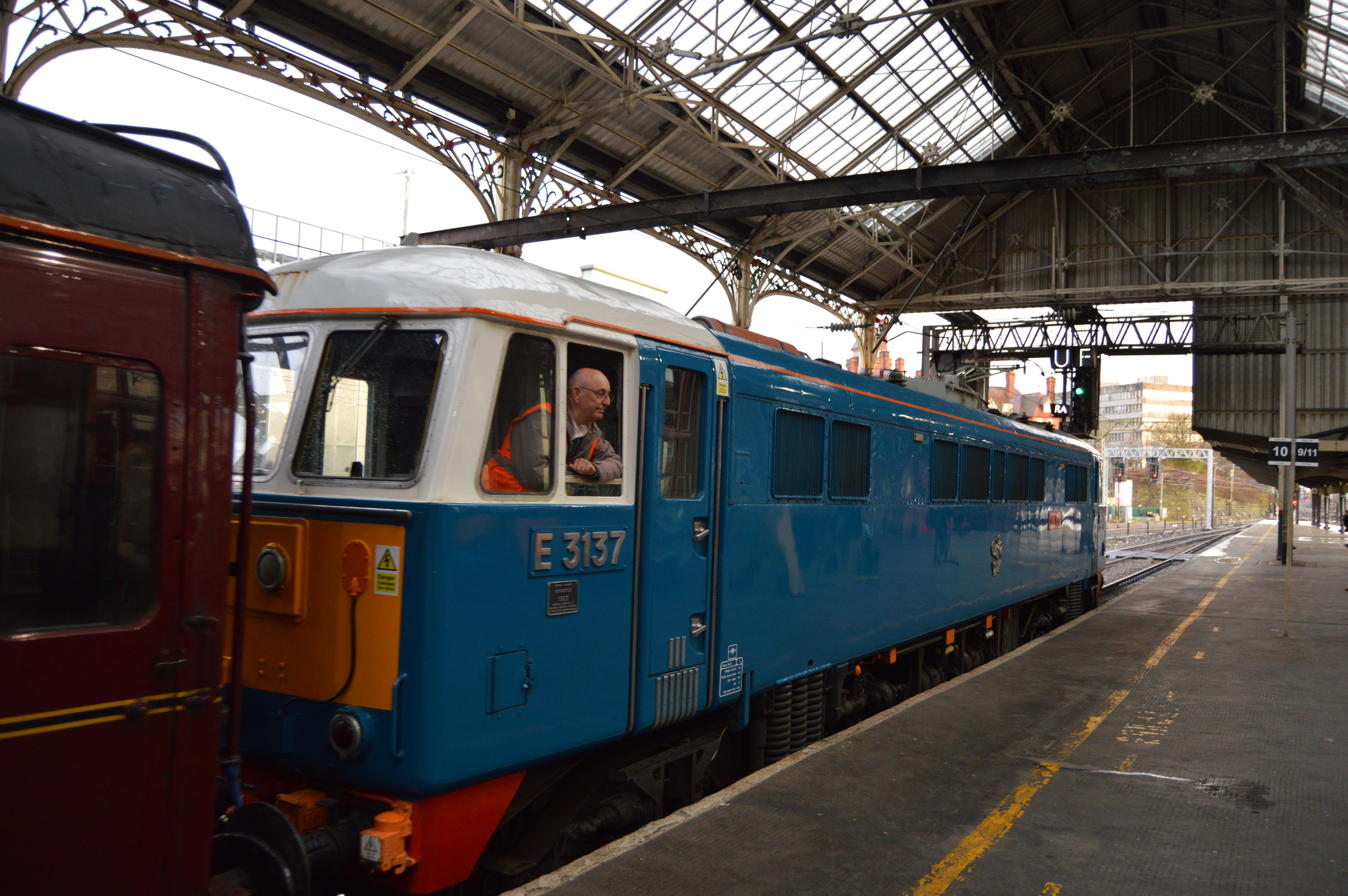
BR Class 86 no 86259 "Les Ross" departing Preston with her owner Les Ross on board in her rear cab.

On Monday 6 January 2003, Ross took over from David Hamilton, on Birmingham's Saga 105.7 FM breakfast show. However, in December 2004, Ross quit the station as he said the station management was guilty of sending "nannying" e-mails which were turning him into a "robo-jock" and was apparently barred from drinking coffee during his early show.

=== Back to the BBC Radio ===
BBC Radio WM re-hired Ross to present a weekly show on Sundays from 9 am to midday. On Sunday 6 February 2005, Ross presented his first weekly show on BBC Radio WM. He would also cover for various holidaying presenters on the station including Adrian Goldberg, Ed Doolan and Danny Kelly. Ross later hosted the afternoon show permanently.

In addition to his Sunday morning show, on Saturday 23 July 2005, Ross also took over the Saturday Breakfast show from 6 to 9 am.

=== Back on daily ===
Ross took over the Monday to Friday 1 to 4 pm slot from Danny Kelly on WM on Tuesday 10 April 2007.

In early 2009, the show went out from 2 to 4 pm on weekdays.

On 7 December 2009, Ross returned to the airwaves when he became the presenter of the Big City Breakfast Show on Birmingham's Big City Radio 89.1. He hosted his final show for the station on Friday 26 March 2010. He returned to the station on 10 February 2013 to front a Sunday afternoon show.

In April 2015, Ross started broadcasting on Wolverhampton's 101.8 WCRFM.

=== Boom Radio and WCR FM ===
In February 2021, a new national station called Boom Radio was launched on DAB and online, catering to the 'boomer generation'. He originally hosted a Sunday morning show from 10am–12noon. He currently presents a show on Sunday afternoons between 4 and 6pm. Ross also presents a Sixties show on WCR FM in Wolverhampton on Sundays 12–2pm.

In June 2023, Ross announced that he had been diagnosed with prostate cancer two years before, in July 2021. After a five-hour operation to have his prostate removed, in September 2021, he is now clear of the disease.

=== Return to BRMB ===
In August 2024, it was announced that Ross would return to BRMB, which had been relaunched in 2023, to present his weekday breakfast show, Les Ross in the Morning, from late September. He was also heard on BRMB on 4 September to celebrate the first anniversary of its relaunch.
