= Ed Doolan =

- Born: Edwin Myer Doolan; 20 July 1941; Sydney, Australia
- Died: 16 January 2018 (aged 76)
- Occupation: Radio broadcaster
- Years active: 1970–2017
- Spouse: Christine Doolan

Edwin Myer Doolan MBE (20 July 1941 – 16 January 2018) was an Australian born naturalised British radio presenter who was a veteran of Birmingham's first commercial radio station BRMB, and subsequently the BBC. At the BBC he presented a weekly show trawling through his broadcast archives from noon until 1 pm on BBC Radio WM on Sunday lunchtime. He was honoured by the British Radio Academy, earning a place in the Radio Hall of Fame. He was presented with Honorary Doctorates from Birmingham's three universities and was the first person to have ever achieved that honour.

On Doolan's lunchtime show of 22 February 2011 he announced he was cutting down on the number of shows he would be presenting, stating he could no longer "continue the current work schedule".

His lunchtime show was on a Friday only from 9 September 2011, and he began presenting a new 9 am – 12 noon Sunday show from 11 September 2011, before reducing his workload even further and switching to a Sunday lunchtime show.

It was announced that Ed Doolan had died in his sleep on the morning of 16 January 2018. He had been suffering from dementia.

== Career ==
After a ten-year career as a school teacher in Sydney, Edinburgh and from 1967 at Highgate Junior School in London, he moved to Cologne in Germany, taking his first step into broadcasting with Radio Deutsche Welle, the German World Service, in August 1970. While in Cologne he worked freelance for BFBS Germany as the quizmaster in Top Marks, a British schools quiz programme similar to the BBC's Top of the Form in UK.

From 1974 until 1981 Doolan worked at BRMB Birmingham's first commercial radio station, then moved to BBC Radio WM in 1982. Doolan began his consumer programme on BBC Radio WM in 1988. Well known for pioneering social action broadcasting, tackling dishonest and cavalier traders on behalf of the consumer, Doolan also took on the big utilities, the councils of the West Midlands and even areas of national government if an injustice was done. He was also a writer and television presenter who has featured on news programmes BBC Midlands Today and has written approaching 950 weekly columns for the Birmingham Mail.

On his consumer show, Doolan aimed to 'make a difference' to the less fortunate with his radio and charity work. He has been heavily involved in many charities carrying his name. Doolan had a large collection of radio and television programmes on cassette, such as reel to reel, VHS, CD and DVD. He discovered a 1968 "Christmas Night with the Stars" containing a ten-minute lost segment of Dad's Army

In 1993, Doolan co-presented the live and local TV talk show Central Weekend Live, but preferred radio to television. Famous people Doolan interviewed included: Telly Savalas, Rolf Harris, Leonard Nimoy, Slim Dusty, Jim Davidson, Ian Smith, Princess Anne, and all high-profile West Midland politicians since 1974.

Doolan interviewed every British Prime Minister since Sir Alec Douglas-Home (1963), except Harold Wilson.

In January 2015 Doolan revealed that he had been coping with dementia for two years, and that was the reason why he had stopped working on live radio, although he plans to continue working "as long as the BBC will let me". He says ″Up till now I've kept pretty quiet about this because I wasn't quite sure how to approach it. But I think if what's happening to me is happening to other people who can come out and say this is me, this is what's happening, then people don't get frightened by it.″.

== Death ==
Doolan died in the early hours of 16 January 2018.

His funeral was held on the afternoon of 5 February 2018 in a private ceremony in Redditch. A memorial service was held at Birmingham Cathedral on 17 May 2018.
