= BBC Radio WM =

Coordinates: 52.4759°N 1.9050°W

- Birmingham; England
- Broadcast area: West Midlands and south Staffordshire
- Frequencies: FM: 95.6 MHz; DAB: 11B (Black Country and Shropshire); DAB: 11C (Birmingham); Freeview: 714
- RDS: BBC WM

Programming
- Language: English
- Format: Local news, talk, music and sport

Ownership
- Owner: BBC Local Radio, BBC West Midlands

History
- First air date: 9 November 1970
- Former names: BBC Radio Birmingham (1970–1981); BBC WM (1981–2020)
- Former frequencies: 828 MW; 1458 MW
- Call sign meaning: British Broadcasting Corporation Radio West Midlands

Technical information
- Licensing authority: Ofcom

Links
- Website: BBC Radio WM

BBC Radio WM is the BBC's local radio station serving the West Midlands conurbation, an urban area centred on Birmingham, Wolverhampton, Solihull, and the Black Country in the English Midlands.

It broadcasts on FM (95.6 MHz), DAB, digital television, and on the internet via BBC Sounds. (Note: Some sports commentary is not available online.) It is broadcast from the BBC studios at The Mailbox in Birmingham city centre, and is primarily transmitted from the station near Sutton Coldfield in Birmingham.

According to RAJAR, the station has a weekly audience of 193,000 listeners and a 2.2% share as of December 2023.

== History ==
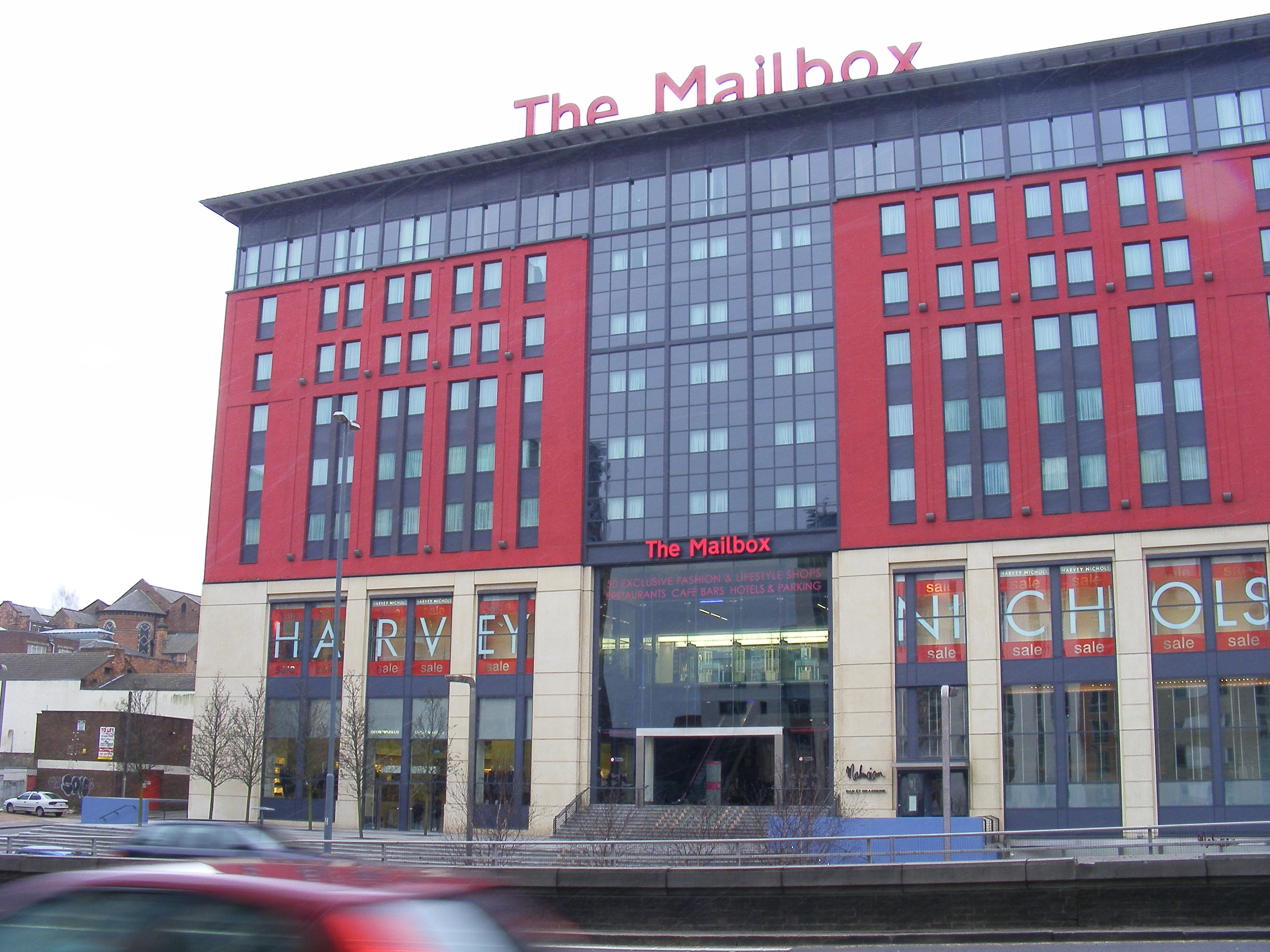
The Mailbox, home to BBC Radio WM's studios in Birmingham

The station launched as BBC Radio Birmingham on 9 November 1970 and on 23 November 1981, the station changed its name to BBC WM to reflect that the station broadcasts to a wider area than just Birmingham. This date also saw the station launch a second MW transmitter to improve MW reception in Birmingham.

A short-lived service called WM Heartlands ran between early 1989 and 1991 serving the 'Heartlands' area of East Birmingham using the 1458 medium wave frequency. It ran as an experiment, opting out from 8 am until 12 am. Further wavelength splitting took place later in 1989 when on 30 October 1989, the BBC Asian Network launched as a part-time service on MW and in 1996, the Asian Network became a full time service. Consequently, at this point, BBC WM stopped broadcasting on MW.

In the 1990s, as an economic measure, BBC WM took over BBC Coventry & Warwickshire in Coventry and Warwickshire. On 3 September 2005, CWR resumed the production of separate programming between 5 am and 10 pm each weekday (6 am to 6 pm at weekends).

Until 2004, BBC WM was broadcast from the Pebble Mill studios, in Edgbaston. On 4 July that year, the station moved to the new BBC Birmingham city centre offices in The Mailbox. Its facilities include two broadcast studios, a talk studio, an operations and production area, and a studio shared with the BBC Asian Network.

=== BBC Radio Wolverhampton ===
BBC Radio Birmingham logo

On 15 January 2021, BBC Radio Wolverhampton launched as a temporary sister station. The service provided eight hours of opt-out programming for listeners in Wolverhampton and the surrounding area each weekday until 31 March 2021.

== Technical ==
The service is broadcast across the West Midlands on 95.6 FM and DAB from the Sutton Coldfield transmitting station situated north of Birmingham.

It also broadcasts on Freeview TV channel 714 in the BBC West Midlands region and streams online via BBC Sounds.

The county of Staffordshire does not have its own designated BBC Local Radio so it is served by 3 different stations: mid and north Staffordshire is served by BBC Radio Stoke, East Staffordshire is served by BBC Radio Derby and south Staffordshire is served by BBC Radio WM.

== Programming ==
BBC Radio WM logo, used from 2020 to 2022.

Local programming is produced and broadcast from the BBC's Birmingham studios from 6 am to 10 pm on Mondays to Saturdays and from 6 am to 6 pm on Sundays.

Off-peak programming, including the late show from 10 pm to 1 am, is simulcast across all BBC Local Radio stations across England.

During the station's downtime, BBC Radio WM simulcasts overnight programming from BBC Radio 5 Live

== Notable presenters ==
- Gordon Astley
- Malcolm Boyden
- Tony Butler
- Carl Chinn (1994–2012)
- Alan Dedicoat (1979–1983)
- Ed Doolan (1982–2017)
- Adrian Goldberg (2003–2006, 2010–2017, 2018–2020)
- Alex Lester (2017–2020)
- Stuart Linnell
- Janice Long (2000–2010)
- Andrew Peach (2008–2011)
- Peter Powell (1970–1975)
- Les Ross (1970–1976, 2005–2009)
- Sunny and Shay (2014–2020)
- Tim Smith
- Frank Stewart (1990s–20??)
- Graham Torrington (2012–2020)
- Tony and Julie Wadsworth
- Jenny Wilkes (1982–2019)
- Ed James
