= Timeline of Kiss =

A timeline of notable events relating to Kiss, a British commercial radio station operated by Bauer Media.

== 1980s ==
- 1985
  - October – The first broadcasts of Kiss as a pirate station take place, initially broadcasting at the weekend across south London but is soon broadcasting across the capital on 94 FM.
- 1986
  - Kiss expands its broadcasting hours when it adds a Friday schedule.
  - Founder Gordon Mac sells shares to ten of the station's DJs, including Tim Westwood, Jonathan More, Norman Jay, Trevor Nelson.
- 1987
  - No events.
- 1988
  - November – The Department for Trade and Industry announces that a series of new stations in areas which already have an Independent Local Radio station will be licensed. Pirate stations are allowed to apply as long as they cease broadcasting and Kiss mounts a campaign to win one of the licenses.
  - 31 December – Kiss holds its 'coming off air' night at Dingwalls, Camden.
- 1989
  - 12 July – Kiss is unsuccessful in its initial bid for a London-wide licence, losing out to Jazz FM.
  - December – A second batch of London-wide incremental licenses are awarded and this time Kiss is successful.

== 1990s ==
- 1990
  - 1 September – Kiss 100 starts broadcasting as a legal, licensed station. Gordon Mac leads a countdown in the studio, and the first official record played is 'Pirates Anthem' by Shabba Ranks and Cocoa Tea. Norman Jay hosts the first full show.
  - 9 September – Kiss holds its launch party at Highbury Fields.
- 1991
  - No events.
- 1992
  - Emap takes full control of Kiss 100.
- 1993
  - October – Norman Jay leaves Kiss.
- 1994
  - 2 March – Kiss launches its jungle music show with DJs on rotation, starting with Fabio & Grooverider.
  - 16 October – Kiss 102 launches in Manchester. Kiss licenses the brand name to licensee Faze FM but the station is fully independent of the London station.
  - November – Danny Rampling takes his Lovegroove Dance Party to BBC Radio 1.
- 1995
  - Another original presenter Dave Pearce leaves for BBC Radio 1.
- 1996
  - Trevor Nelson, who had been involved with the station since its time as a pirate, is the latest presenter to join BBC Radio 1.
- 1997
  - 14 February – Faze FM launches Kiss 105 across Yorkshire. The station shares some of its programming with Kiss 102.
  - April – Judge Jules becomes the latest DJ to move to BBC Radio 1.
  - 29 September – Faze FM, the owner of Kiss 102 and Kiss 105, is bought by Chrysalis Radio and the stations are rebranded Galaxy 102 and Galaxy 105 respectively.
  - December – Gordon Mac stands down as Managing Director.
- 1998
  - 28 March – Kiss' founder Gordon Mac presents his final show for the station.
  - Gilles Peterson leaves to join BBC Radio 1.
  - 18 December – Original presenter Steve Jackson is sacked, resulting in a legal case the following August on grounds of racial discrimination.
- 1999
  - January – Controversial changes are made to the station following Emap's decision to align the station with the rest of its operations. The on-air changes lead to criticisms from presenters and listeners who feel that the station is losing its musical direction. The changes see Bam Bam take over as presenter of the breakfast show.

== 2000s ==
- 2000
  - 26 June – Kiss TV launches.
  - September – John Digweed makes his debut on Kiss 100.
- 2001
  - Steve Smart joins.
- 2002
  - No events.
- 2003
  - Graham Gold leaves, having presented a Friday night show for the past decade.
- 2004
  - No events.
- 2005
  - Logan Sama joins to present a weekly grime show.
  - 21 June – Following Emap's purchase of Scottish Radio Holdings, it acquires dance stations Vibe 101 and Vibe 105-108.
- 2006
  - April – Bam Bam is fired shortly before the station is handed a then record fine of £175,000 (equivalent to £302,000 in 2025) for a series of breaches which include prank calls being broadcast on his show without the consent of the 'victims.'
  - Robin Banks replaces Bam Bam as host of the breakfast show.
  - 6 September –
    - Due to falling listener figures, Kiss is relaunched with a renewed focus on dance music.
    - Vibe 101 and Vibe 105–108 are rebranded Kiss 101 and Kiss 105-108. Emap had become owners of the Vibe stations the previous year due to its purchase of Scottish Radio Holdings.
  - 22 October – The Kiss network becomes one of the broadcasters who air a new chart show called the Fresh 40 chart show. It counts down the top 40 r'n'b and dance songs and is broadcast against commercial radio's Hit40uk chart and the BBC Radio 1 Sunday afternoon chart show.
- 2007
  - May – Rickie Haywood Williams and Melvin Odoom replace Robin Banks as host of the breakfast show.
- 2008
  - 29 January – Bauer completes the purchase of EMAP's radio, television and consumer media businesses, purchasing the assets for £1.14bn.
- 2009
  - 1 March – The final edition of the Fresh 40 chart is broadcast.

== 2010s ==
- 2010
  - December – Ofcom approves a request from owners Bauer Radio to drop local programming from the three Kiss stations, creating a national service on the condition that Kiss becomes available on 35 DAB multiplexes on the day local information is dropped, rising to 38 within 3 months of the changes.
- 2011
  - January – John Digweed's show, called Transitions since the mid 2000s, is broadcast on Kiss for the final time.
- 2012
  - November – David Rodigan leaves, having been with the station since it launched in 1990. He resigns following a decision to move his reggae show to a later slot.
  - 27 December – Kiss 100 launches on the Digital One national DAB multiplex.
- 2013
  - 7 May – Kiss Fresh launches. It is available on Freeview and online but not on any DAB multiplexes.
  - 12 May – Kisstory launches as a full-time station, again just on Freeview and online.
- 2014
  - Logan Sama leaves for BBC 1Xtra.
  - September – DJ EZ leaves after presenting a UK garage show for the station for the past 14 years.
  - 12 December – Kisstory and Kiss Fresh start broadcasting on DAB for the first time when the appear on the Greater London I DAB multiplex.
- 2015
  - January – Kisstory launches on many local multiplexes across the UK.
- 2016
  - 26 February – Kiss is launched in Norway and Finland. Content is managed by local teams. In Finland, Kiss is broadcast on FM and in Norway Kiss and Kisstory are broadcast on DAB.
  - 29 February – Kisstory is one of the launch stations on the semi-national Sound Digital multiplex.
  - 1 May – Kiss Fresh takes over some of the local slots vacated by Kisstory when it launched on Sound Digital.
- 2017
  - 10 July – Kiss Fresh launches nationally on the Digital One multiplex. Its schedule and playlist is refreshed to differentiate it from the main Kiss station. However the station's carriage on this multiplex lasts for less than months when it is replaced on 6 November by Magic Christmas.
- 2018
  - January –
    - Kiss launches two new online on-demand stations – KISS Jams and KISS Grime.
    - Some changes to the late night schedules take place on the main station and new specialist shows launch on Kiss Fresh.
  - 26 November – Kiss breakfast presenters Rickie Haywood Williams, Melvin Odoom and Charlie Hedges will leave the station at the end of the year to succeed Charlie Sloth on the evening show on BBC Radio 1.
- 2019
  - 2 January – Tom Green and Daisy Maskell take over as co-presenters of the breakfast show.
  - 11 February – Kisstory moves from the semi-national SDL multiplex to the more widely available Digital One multiplex.
  - March – Kiss Fresh is removed from the majority of local multiplexes resulting in DAB carriage for the station all-but coming to an end. The station does retain its carriage on Freeview.
  - August – Bauer establishes a suite of online-only streaming audio services spun off from its radio brands, including three new Kiss stations – Kiss Dance, Kiss Garage and Kiss Ibiza. Kiss Dnce would later amend its branding to 'Kiss Dance', whilst Kiss Ibiza would subsequently go off air to make way for an urban music stream, Kiss Jams, later returning on a separate fourth stream.

== 2020s ==
- 2020
  - 23 June – Tom Green and Daisy Maskell announce they will be leaving the breakfast show, with Daisy becoming the host of the new Kiss Fresh breakfast show and Tom moving to the Hits Radio network. They will be replaced on 3 August by Jordan Banjo and Perri Kiely.
  - 7 September – Tatum McGreal joins the station, and the Kiss Hype Chart is introduced.
  - 31 October – Kiss, Kisstory, and Kiss Fresh unite for the KISS Haunted House Party's first simulcast across the entire Kiss Network.
- 2021
  - No events.
- 2022
  - 27 May – Bauer Media announce plans to launch a subscription service for Absolute Radio and Kiss, allowing listeners to access commercial free content for a monthly fee.
- 2023
  - 11 July – Ofcom gives Bauer Media permission to change KISS Radio to Greatest Hits Radio on three of its four FM frequencies in the East of England. Kiss will continue on FM in Norwich.
  - 13 December – Kiss was removed from Sky and Virgin Media, along with Absolute Radio, Absolute Radio 80s, Absolute Radio 90s, Absolute Radio Classic Rock, Hits Radio, Greatest Hits Radio, Magic, Jazz FM and Planet Rock.
- 2024
  - 13 March – Sam Sax, a DJ who mixes saxophone with house music, is named Kiss's Chosen One as the station's search for a new DJ concludes.
  - 2 April – Kiss was removed from Freeview along with Kisstory, Kiss Fresh, Hits Radio, Greatest Hits Radio, Magic and Kerrang! whilst Absolute Radio remains on Freeview until 10 May.
  - 1 July – Kiss TV closes after 26 years, along with The Box, 4Music, Magic and Kerrang! TV, as part of Channel Four Television Corporation's plans to become a digital-first public service streamer by 2030.
  - 7 August – Bauer announces that KISS will be replaced by Hits Radio on FM in London, Norfolk and the West of England later in the year.
  - 16 September – Kisstory R&B launches as a mainline station after being-on air for two years as part of Kiss Premium. At the same time, Kiss Garage and Kiss Bliss become premium-only stations.
  - 22 September – Hits Radio replaces Kiss on FM in London, the west and in Norwich. This means that the station no longer broadcasts on FM.
  - 27 September – The final edition of the Kiss Hype Chart airs, with Dancing in the Flames by The Weeknd at its #1 spot.
  - 30 September – Kiss officially launches a new brand campaign; with it, a new tagline: 'The Biggest Dance and R&B'.
  - 25 October – Specialist DJ Ben Malone presents his final show on Kiss. He is replaced by Cool FM DJ Hix.
  - 30 October – The final Kiss Haunted House party is held.
  - 24 November – Cool FM host Evanna Maxted presents her first show on Kiss, having joined as a permanent cover presenter.
  - 18 December – Harriet Rose and Henrie Kwushue present their final show on Kiss after only one year.
  - 27 December – Specialist DJ Sam Divine presents her final show on Kiss.
  - 30 December – Kisstory presenter Justin Wilkes joins Kiss.
- 2025
  - 2 January – Specialist DJ 'DJ S.K.T.' presents his final show on Kiss.
  - 4 January – Specialist DJ TCTS presents his final show on Kiss.
  - 5 January – Specialist DJs Mollie Collins and Davda present their final shows on Kiss.
  - 6 January – Kiss content director Rebecca Frank initiates a major shake-up in Kiss' schedule, which includes a reduction in specialist airtime and the re-allocation of several daytime presenters, such as Jordan Lee, who replaces Marvin Humes after his transferral to Kisstory.
  - 2 March – Television celebrities Pete Wicks and Olivia Attwood join Kiss together to host a new Sunday afternoon show.
  - 5 March – A new jingle package is rolled out across the Kiss network, which includes, for the first time, a sonic logo for the Kiss brand.
  - 31 March –
    - Kiss and Kisstory will begin broadcasting via DAB+, and in stereo.
    - Kiss Fresh is rebranded as Kiss Xtra.
  - 26 May – The 'Kiss 100 Chart' is broadcast, counting down 100 songs as voted for by listeners on Rayo.
  - 1 June – The final 'SuperKISSTORY' show is broadcast on Kiss.
  - 15 June – Michael Lewis presents his final show on Kiss after roughly 17 years on the station. Michael continues to present the Kisstory weekday breakfast show.
  - 24 July – Thursday night specialist DJ Shosh presents her final show. Scott Garcia takes over from 31 July.
- 2026
  - 5 January – Kiss content director Paul Gerrard reformats Kiss into a CHR station, but asserts Kiss' retention of its focus on dance and hip-hop music. With this change, Kiss is given a new tagline, 'The Best Vibes & Energy', replacing its short-lived predecessor.
  - 30 January – Jordan Banjo and Perri Kiely present their final breakfast show. Tyler West and Chloe Burrows take over from 2 February.
  - 9 April – Thursday night specialist DJ Scott Garcia leaves Kiss after only 8 months.
  - 10 April – Friday night specialist DJ Fred V leaves Kiss.
  - 11 April – Friday & Saturday night specialist DJ Majestic leaves Kiss after 6 years to start a new show on Kiss Dance.
  - 12 April – Bauer unveils new logos for the Kiss network as it seeks to exploit the growing popularity of digital media.
  - 16 April – Several new shows are announced by Bauer across the Kiss network, including a new 'Friday Night KISS' show with Rio Fredrika. It is also confirmed that the shows of DJ Q, Anton Powers, Mark Knight and Ace are moving to Kiss Dance and Kiss Xtra respectively.
