= 1997 in British radio =

This is a list of events in British radio during 1997.

== Events ==
=== January ===
- 6 January – Leicester Sound moves frequency and increases transmitter power.
- Undated in January
  - Chris Evans leaves the Radio 1 Breakfast Show after being sacked.
  - Tracks by the boy band East 17 are removed from the playlists of at least eleven radio stations following recent comments from their lead singer Brian Harvey about his use of the drug ecstasy. In an interview with Independent Radio News he had claimed to have taken twelve tablets in one evening and then driven, prompting condemnation in the House of Commons from Prime Minister John Major. Harvey was sacked from the band on 17 January, despite making a full apology for the comments.
- 30 January – Speaking on BBC Radio 1 in defence of Brian Harvey, musician Noel Gallagher claims that drugs are "like getting up and having a cup of tea in the morning".

=== February ===
- Undated in February – Emap launches a network of Magic stations on its MW frequencies across the north of England. They replace stations such as Great North Radio and Great Yorkshire Gold.
- 17 February –
  - Mark and Lard become the Radio 1 breakfast show's new presenters.
  - Jo Whiley begins presenting a weekday lunchtime show on Radio 1.

=== March ===
- 17 March – After broadcasting a temporary service called 1278 and 1530 AM West Yorkshire, Classic Gold launches in Bradford and Halifax/Huddersfield. The station is a simulcast of the Classic Gold network heard on MW in central and southern England with a local breakfast show supplemented by local news and information throughout the day.

=== April ===
- 5 April – Pick of the Pops returns to the BBC. The programme is aired on Saturday afternoons on Radio 2 with Alan Freeman returning as host. The programme had last been on the BBC on BBC Radio 1 at the end of 1992 and throughout most of the intervening period it had been broadcast on Capital Gold.

=== May ===
- No events.

=== June ===
- 30 June – The British Forces Broadcasting Service ends its transmission to Hong Kong ahead of the colony's handover of Sovereignty to China.

=== July ===
- 28 July – Chris Moyles becomes the new host of the Early Breakfast Show on BBC Radio 1.

=== August ===
- Undated in August – Talk Radio broadcasts live sport for the first time when it begins its live coverage of the Football League.
- 31 August – Regular programming is interrupted to provide ongoing news coverage of the death of Diana, Princess of Wales. Radios 2, 3, 4 and BBC Radio 5 Live broadcast a joint programme presented by Peter Allen and James Naughtie.

=== September ===
- 1 September – BBC Southern Counties Radio is relaunched. The all-speech format is dropped and the station reverts to a more traditional mix of music and speech.
- 6 September – Many UK radio stations broadcast live coverage of the Funeral of Diana, Princess of Wales.
- 29 September – Following the purchase of Faze FM, owner of Kiss 102 and Kiss 105, by Chrysalis Radio, the dance music stations are renamed Galaxy 102 and Galaxy 105.

=== October ===
- 13 October – Mark and Lard are replaced as Radio 1 breakfast presenters by Zoë Ball and Kevin Greening. Mark and Lard are moved to an afternoon presenting slot. On the same day Chris Evans begins presenting a rival breakfast show on Virgin Radio.

=== November ===
- 17 November – Launch of the Broadcast Radio website.

=== December ===
- 9 December – Chris Evans's media production company, Ginger Media Group buys Virgin Radio from Richard Branson for £85m. Branson had planned to sell the station to Capital Radio, but Evans, who had not wanted to work for the station, launched a rival bid.

=== Undated ===
- BBC News Centre, including radio news, relocates to Television Centre, London.

== Station debuts ==
- 6 January – West FM
- February – 1278 and 1530 AM West Yorkshire
- 12 February –
  - Magic 1161
  - Magic AM
- 14 February – Kiss 105
- 19 February –
  - Magic 1152
  - Magic 1170
- 17 March – Magic 1548
- 1 April – Wish FM
- 4 May – Yorkshire Dales Radio
- 23 May – Lochbroom FM
- 1 September –
  - XFM London
  - KMFM Medway
- 21 September – KMFM Canterbury
- 23 September – Century 106
- 29 September – KMFM Shepway and White Cliffs Country
- 7 October – 107.7 The Wolf
- 11 October – KMFM Medway
- 12 October – Dune FM
- 20 October – European Klassik Rock
- 23 October – Star 107.7
- 17 November – Sovereign FM
- 22 November – Vibe 105–108
- 28 November – Star FM 107.2
- 6 December – Waves Radio

== Changes of station frequency ==
Station	Moved from	Moved to
Leicester Sound	103.2FM	105.4FM

== Programme debuts ==
- 14 November – Blue Jam on BBC Radio 1 (1997–1999)
- Unknown – Westway on the BBC World Service (1997–2005)

== Continuing radio programmes ==
=== 1940s ===
- Sunday Half Hour (1940–2018)
- Desert Island Discs (1942–Present)
- Letter from America (1946–2004)
- Woman's Hour (1946–Present)
- A Book at Bedtime (1949–Present)

=== 1950s ===
- The Archers (1950–Present)
- The Today Programme (1957–Present)
- Sing Something Simple (1959–2001)
- Your Hundred Best Tunes (1959–2007)

=== 1960s ===
- Farming Today (1960–Present)
- In Touch (1961–Present)
- The World at One (1965–Present)
- The Official Chart (1967–Present)
- Just a Minute (1967–Present)
- The Living World (1968–Present)
- The Organist Entertains (1969–2018)

=== 1970s ===
- PM (1970–Present)
- Start the Week (1970–Present)
- Week Ending (1970–1998)
- You and Yours (1970–Present)
- I'm Sorry I Haven't a Clue (1972–Present)
- Good Morning Scotland (1973–Present)
- Kaleidoscope (1973–1998)
- Newsbeat (1973–Present)
- The News Huddlines (1975–2001)
- File on 4 (1977–Present)
- Money Box (1977–Present)
- The News Quiz (1977–Present)
- Breakaway (1979–1998)
- Feedback (1979–Present)
- The Food Programme (1979–Present)
- Science in Action (1979–Present)

=== 1980s ===
- In Business (1983–Present)
- Sounds of the 60s (1983–Present)
- Loose Ends (1986–Present)

=== 1990s ===
- The Moral Maze (1990–Present)
- Essential Selection (1991–Present)
- No Commitments (1992–2007)
- The Pepsi Chart (1993–2002)
- Wake Up to Wogan (1993–2009)
- Essential Mix (1993–Present)
- Up All Night (1994–Present)
- Wake Up to Money (1994–Present)
- Julie Enfield Investigates (1994–1999)
- Private Passions (1995–Present)
- Chambers (1996–1999)
- Parkinson's Sunday Supplement (1996–2007)
- The David Jacobs Collection (1996–2013)

== Ending this year ==
- 24 April – Harry Hill's Fruit Corner (1993–1997)
- June – Collins and Maconie's Hit Parade (1994–1997)
- December – Comedy Quiz (1996–1997)

== Closing this year ==
- 12 February – Great Yorkshire Gold (1989–1997)
- 19 February – Great North Radio (1989–1997)
- 17 March – 1278 and 1530 AM West Yorkshire (1997)

== Deaths ==
- 16 January – Ronald Mason, 70, radio drama producer
- 20 January – Dennis Main Wilson, 72, broadcast comedy producer
- 2 February – Godfrey Baseley, 92, radio executive
- 4 April – Mike Raven ((Austin) Churton Fairman), 72, DJ, actor and sculptor
- 26 June – Charlie Chester, 83, stand-up comedian and broadcast presenter
- 19 September – Jack May, 75, actor

== See also ==
- 1997 in British music
- 1997 in British television
- 1997 in the United Kingdom
- List of British films of 1997
