= Will Cozens =

British radio presenter and DJ

Will Cozens is a British radio presenter and DJ formerly employed by Global Radio as a presenter on Capital & Capital London

Cozens was spotted by the Bauer Radio owned Kiss 100, after featuring on Channel 4's Soundclash, originally he presented weekends and early breakfast and later also evenings on Kiss 101 and Kiss 105-108. He has interviewed Chipmunk, Chris Brown, Estelle, Tinie Tempah and more at Kiss 100.

He joined Global Radio on 3 January 2011 as a presenter on Capital. Cozens has hosted a number of shows on Capital FM including the late show, overnights, early breakfast, Saturday nights, Saturday drivetime, weekend afternoons, weekend early breakfast and Capital London weekend breakfast. Between 21 November and 30 December 2011, he covered the Capital London drivetime show from 4 pm to 7 pm. During his time at Capital, he has also previously covered the evening show, afternoons and mid mornings. Cozens most recently presented weekends 5 am-9 am. He left the radio station in April 2022 after a new schedule was announced.

He was a pundit in the BBC Sound of 2010 and Sound of 2011 poll.

Cozens is also an electronic music DJ.

He obtained a Law Degree at University making sure he specialised in entertainment law, specifically including defamation, slander, libel and even Ofcom.
