= Capital Yorkshire =

Radio station in Leeds, England

Coordinates: 53.799814°N 1.556454°W

- Leeds; United Kingdom
- Broadcast area: South Yorkshire & North Derbyshire, West Yorkshire, North Yorkshire, East Riding of Yorkshire & Northern Lincolnshire
- Frequencies: DAB: 11B Bradford & Huddersfield; DAB: 10D Bauer Humberside; DAB: 12D Bauer Leeds; DAB: 10C MuxCo North Yorkshire; DAB: 11C Bauer Sheffield; FM: 105.1 MHz Emley Moor; FM: 105.6 MHz Bradford; FM: 105.6 MHz Tapton Hill; FM: 105.8 MHz High Hunsley
- RDS: CAPITAL
- Branding: Yorkshire’s No.1 Hit Music Station

Programming
- Format: Contemporary hit radio
- Network: Capital

Ownership
- Owner: Global

History
- First air date: 14 February 1997
- Last air date: 21 February 2025

Links
- Webcast: Global Player
- Website: www.capitalfm.com/yorkshire/

Capital Yorkshire was a regional radio station owned by Global as part of the Capital network. It broadcast to South Yorkshire & North Derbyshire, West Yorkshire, North Yorkshire, the East Riding of Yorkshire and Northern Lincolnshire.

Capital Yorkshire was the largest regional British radio station outside of London.

== Technical ==
Capital Yorkshire broadcast on 105.8 MHz FM at a power of 9.6 kW from High Hunsley, which covered the East Riding of Yorkshire and Northern Lincolnshire and on 105.1 MHz FM at a power of 2.4 kW from Emley Moor, which covered West Yorkshire. It also had two filler transmitters, both on 105.6 MHz FM, one from Idle at 0.5 kW which covered Bradford and the other from Tapton Hill at 0.24 kW covering Sheffield.

DAB broadcasts were formerly provided on the MXR 12A Yorkshire region multiplex from nine transmitters, with the strongest signal from Emley Moor, and other DAB signals from Belmont, Bilsdale, Acklam Wold (North Yorkshire), and Tapton Hill. With the closure of the MXR multiplex in 2015, Capital rolled down to being delivered over the five local area multiplexes around Yorkshire and the Humber, enabling continuation of essentially region-wide coverage.

A version of Galaxy Yorkshire's output was also broadcast in various other areas on DAB as Galaxy Digital, with the UK's ID to replace the Yorkshire one and the regional Yorkshire adverts replaced by UK-wide adverts. (In some cases, a cut down song would be played to fill in for all or part of the commercial break.) This service was aired in a number of areas which did not have their own Galaxy service (including London and the East Midlands), and was also broadcast on Sky and Virgin Media until 15 November 2010 when it was replaced with LBC News 1152. Galaxy was removed from the London DAB multiplex on 16 November 2010, replaced by The Arrow (the only Global station brand not transmitted in London at that time.)

== History ==
=== Galaxy Yorkshire ===
The station launched at 1.05 pm on 14 February 1997 as Kiss 105, but became Galaxy 105 later that year after a take over by the Chrysalis Group, then in 2006 it became simply Galaxy Yorkshire. Launched as a dance music station, later years saw the playlist expanded to incorporate urban music genres.

The stations strapline was altered to "passion for music, passion for life" to reflect its new target demographic which had been changed from 15–29 to 15–34. This was reinforced by the playing of more old school "Galaxy Anthems" – similar to Bauer rival Kiss's "Kisstory". In 2008 it was rebranded as a mainstream station along with all the other Galaxy Stations with a new 'Love Music' strapline before becoming "Yorkshire's No. 1 Hit Music Station" in July 2010.

=== Capital Yorkshire ===
The station was rebranded as Capital Yorkshire on 3 January 2011 as part of a merger of Global Radio's Galaxy and Hit Music networks to form the nine-station Capital network. On 20 June 2014, long serving Capital Breakfast presenter Simon Hirst left Global Radio after 14 years.

On 26 February 2019, Global confirmed the station's local breakfast and weekend shows would be replaced with networked programming from April 2019. The weekday Drivetime show was retained alongside news bulletins, traffic updates and advertising.

On 21 February 2025, Capital Yorkshire broadcast its final programme following further Ofcom-sanctioned deregulation which removes the final requirements for locally produced programming in England. Consequently, JoJo, who co-presented what was the one remaining local programme, Adam & JoJo, leaves, having been at the station since it launched as Kiss 105 28 years earlier, in 1997.

== Programming ==
All programming is broadcast and produced from Global's London headquarters.

Global's newsroom broadcasts hourly localised news updates from 6am-6pm on weekdays and 8am-12pm at weekends.

== News ==
Global's Newsroom broadcasts regionally-focused news updates each hour from 5 am–6 pm on weekdays and 6 am–12 pm at weekends. These bulletins feature a mix of regional, national and international news. Regional travel news is also broadcast at certain times of the day.

The Leeds newsroom also produces bulletins for Communicorp-owned Heart Yorkshire along with other broadcast centres.

== Former notable presenters ==
- Bam Bam
- Sacha Brooks
- Rich Clarke
- David Dunne (Hed Kandi & Nu Cool)
- Andi Durrant
- Riley & Durrant
- Boy George
- Stephanie Hirst
- Nemone
- Adil Ray
- Adele Roberts
- Steve Sutherland
- Margherita Taylor
- Tiësto
- Jez Willis
