= Sunset 102 =

- England
- Broadcast area: Manchester
- Frequency: 102 MHz

Programming
- Format: Dance

History
- First air date: 22 October 1989
- Last air date: October 1993

Sunset 102 was a radio station broadcasting to Manchester, England between 1989 and 1993.

== History ==
Sunset 102 launched as the first of a series of stations in areas which were already served by an Independent Local Radio station. Known as Incremental radio stations, they had to offer output not already available on ILR, such as specialist music or unique programmes for a specific section of the community. Sunset chose to offer a service of dance music and local community programming.

One of the station's founders was Mike Shaft, who was Managing Director and Programme Controller. The station proved popular with listeners, but Shaft left the station in 1990 due to disagreement with some members of the Board about the direction that the station was taking.

In May 1993, the Radio Authority prematurely terminated Sunset's licence, apparently accusing the station of providing inaccurate information about its financial and management affairs. In August 1993, the station reportedly had its transmission facilities withdrawn by NTL for non-payment. Following a brief return to the air, the liquidator was called in and the station fell silent in October 1993.

The liquidator was later to re-apply on behalf of Sunset Radio for its re-advertised licence - but lost out to Faze FM, who had proposed a dance music format. Faze used the name Kiss 102 for their station which they licensed from London station Kiss 100. It was later sold to Chrysalis Radio and re-branded to Galaxy 102. Their owners were then bought by Global Radio and the station became part of the Galaxy Network.

On 3 January 2011, Galaxy, along with Global's Hit Music Network and several other stations were all rebranded to form the Capital network. Other than the weekday drivetime shows and local news, the majority of Capital's output was networked from London.

== Relaunch ==
At 7am on Monday 12 October 2015 the station relaunched as The New Sunset Radio streaming on the internet and DAB Digital radio, in the Manchester area, as part of a 9-month trial that includes several other stations.

The output is similar with many of the original DJs including Mike Shaft, Steve Quirk and Audrey L. Hall.

== Sunset DJs/presenters ==
- Ray Rose
- Pete Baker
- Duncan Smith
- Steve Quirk
- Jagger & Woody
- Mix Factory (Higgy, Mark XTC, Dave Pullen, Keith Biggs, Stubby)
- Andy Wiz****
- Hacienda DJs (Dave Rofe, Pete Robinson)
- Mike Lewis
- Hewan Clarke
- Dave Mason
- Massey & Frankie Shields
- Simon M
- 808 State
- Mike Shaft
- DJ Leaky Fresh

Dave Croft

- Terry Christian
- Liam Howlett
- Sami B
- Paul Hollins
- Deval
- Greg Edwards
- Paul Harvey
- Cousin Matty
- Laney D
- Clash FM - DJ Carlos (Renegade FM), DJ Jay Wearden, DJ Moggy, JFMC (MC)
- Larry Benji
- DJ Clarkee
- Limit FM - Rick Jones, Reka
