= Capital Manchester =

Coordinates: 53.480543°N 2.253398°W

- Manchester; England
- Broadcast area: Greater Manchester, Cheshire and Lancashire
- Frequencies: FM: 102.0 MHz; DAB: 12C (Manchester); 12A (Lancashire)
- RDS: CAPITAL
- Branding: Manchester's No.1 Hit Music Station

Programming
- Format: Contemporary hit radio

Ownership
- Owner: Global
- Sister stations: Heart North West; Smooth North West

History
- First air date: 16 October 1994

Links
- Website: Capital Manchester

Capital Manchester was a local radio station owned and operated by Global Radio as part of the Capital radio network. The station broadcast from their studios at Global's Manchester HQ in the XYZ Building in Spinningfields, Manchester.

In April 2019, the station was merged with 2BR in Lancashire to form Capital Manchester and Lancashire.

== History ==
The 102 MHz frequency in Manchester has a chequered background. Initially it was occupied by Sunset 102 which included regular shows from house music innovators 808 State and a Saturday evening rave show from Sammy B; both were cited by Dave Haslam in City Life to have been instrumental in reflecting and developing the early rave culture in the city. However, due to occasional threats of violence on air and other breaches of the licence the station was closed.

The licence was re-advertised and quickly won by Faze FM who launched Kiss 102 on 16 October 1994. The licence win was spearheaded by Eugene Perera's Level Broadcast, aided by Mike Powell's Infinity Radio consultancy, and included shareholders UKRD, Eastern Counties Newspaper Group and 3i. Gary Burton, who had presented at Radio Trent for much of the 1980s and early 1990s, was Kiss 102's first breakfast presenter.

The station became a victim of its own success when just months after opening a second station, Kiss 105 in Yorkshire, the station's board accepted a £17.6 million takeover bid from the Chrysalis Group in 1996 for a company that had cost just £600k to set up three years earlier.

Chrysalis rebranded the station as Galaxy 102 in 1997. Eleven days after the transfer of ownership, as a direct result of EMAP, the Kiss brand owners refused to franchise the Kiss name to Chrysalis. The music policy was toned down, integrating R'n'B into the playlist and dispensing with many of the specialist programmes and presenters. Nevertheless, their investment in advertising and change of music policy was able to grow the audience further.

The station was rebranded as Capital on 3 January 2011 as part of a merger of Global Radio's Galaxy and Hit Music networks to form the nine-station Capital network.

On 1 June 2017, local programming moved from Salford to new studios at the XYZ Building in the Spinningfields district of Manchester City Centre. Capital Manchester shares facilities with sister station Heart North West and two Communicorp-owned stations, Smooth North West and Radio X 90s.

On 26 February 2019, Global confirmed the station would be merged with 2BR in East and Central Lancashire. As of April 2019, local output consists of a three-hour Drivetime show on weekdays, alongside news bulletins, traffic updates and advertising. Capital Manchester's local breakfast and weekend shows were replaced with network programming from London.

== Technical ==
The transmitter is on top of the City Tower in Piccadilly in Manchester, the same place as the transmitter for Radio X and Radio X 90s. All 3 services share the same broadcast antenna system which is located on the centre tower and is illuminated with red Aircraft warning lights at night.

=== Breakfast show presenters ===
Capital Manchester (2011–2019)

- Rob Ellis (Capital Breakfast with Rob Ellis, 2011–2019)

Galaxy 102 (1997–2011)

- Rob Ellis (The Rob Ellis Show, 2007 - 2011)
  - Co-presented with Rachel Burke-Davies, Nigel "Wingman" Clucas, and 'Stand Up' Alex Boardman
- Wes Butters (2005–2007)
  - Co-presented with Alex Boardman and 'Irish Alan' Toner
- Simon "Nicksy" Nicks (Nicksy in the Morning, 2000–2005)
  - Co-presented with Lynsey Horn and 'Irish Alan' Toner
- Adam Cole (1997–2000)

Kiss 102 (1994–1997)

- Adam Cole (1997)
- Gary Burton (1994–1996)

== Notable presenters ==
- Mike Cartwright Radio CK travel reporter
- Sacha Brooks
- Wes Butters
- Rich Clarke
- Andi Durrant
- Stephanie Hirst
- Darryl Morris
- Dave Kelly
- Adele Roberts
- Steve Sutherland
- Margherita Taylor
- Tiësto
