= Mi-Soul =

Mi-Soul Radio
- England
- Broadcast area: London
- Frequency: 12A (London DAB)

Programming
- Format: Soul / R&B / House / Reggae

History
- First air date: 27 June 2015 (DAB)

Links
- Webcast: mi-soul.com/radioplayer/
- Website: mi-soul.com/

Mi-Soul is a radio station on DAB and online playing soul, R&B, house and other genres including hip-hop, reggae and DnB.

Mi-Soul was founded by Gordon Mac (formerly Kiss FM and Colourful Radio), with long-time business partner Martin Strivens. Having left Colourful in June 2011, Mac launched Mi-Soul as an internet radio station in July 2012. It commenced broadcasting on the Switch London 2 digital radio network on 27 June 2015.

Mi-Soul presenters and DJs include: Lindsay Wesker, Jazzie B, Jumpin Jack Frost, Brandon Block, and Dave VJ (formerly of Kiss); Femi Fem, Mastermind, Greg Edwards (formerly Capital Radio); George Kay, Craig Williams, Jigs, Jon Jules, Calvin Francis, and Natty B (formerly Choice FM); Ronnie Herel, and Michael Angol (formerly Solar Radio); and Mike Vitti (formerly Jazz FM) and Chris Philips. Other presenters to have appeared include the late Colin Faver and Paul 'Trouble' Anderson.

As of December 2023, the station broadcasts to a weekly audience of 161,000 listeners, according to RAJAR.
