= Nemone =

British radio presenter (born 1972)

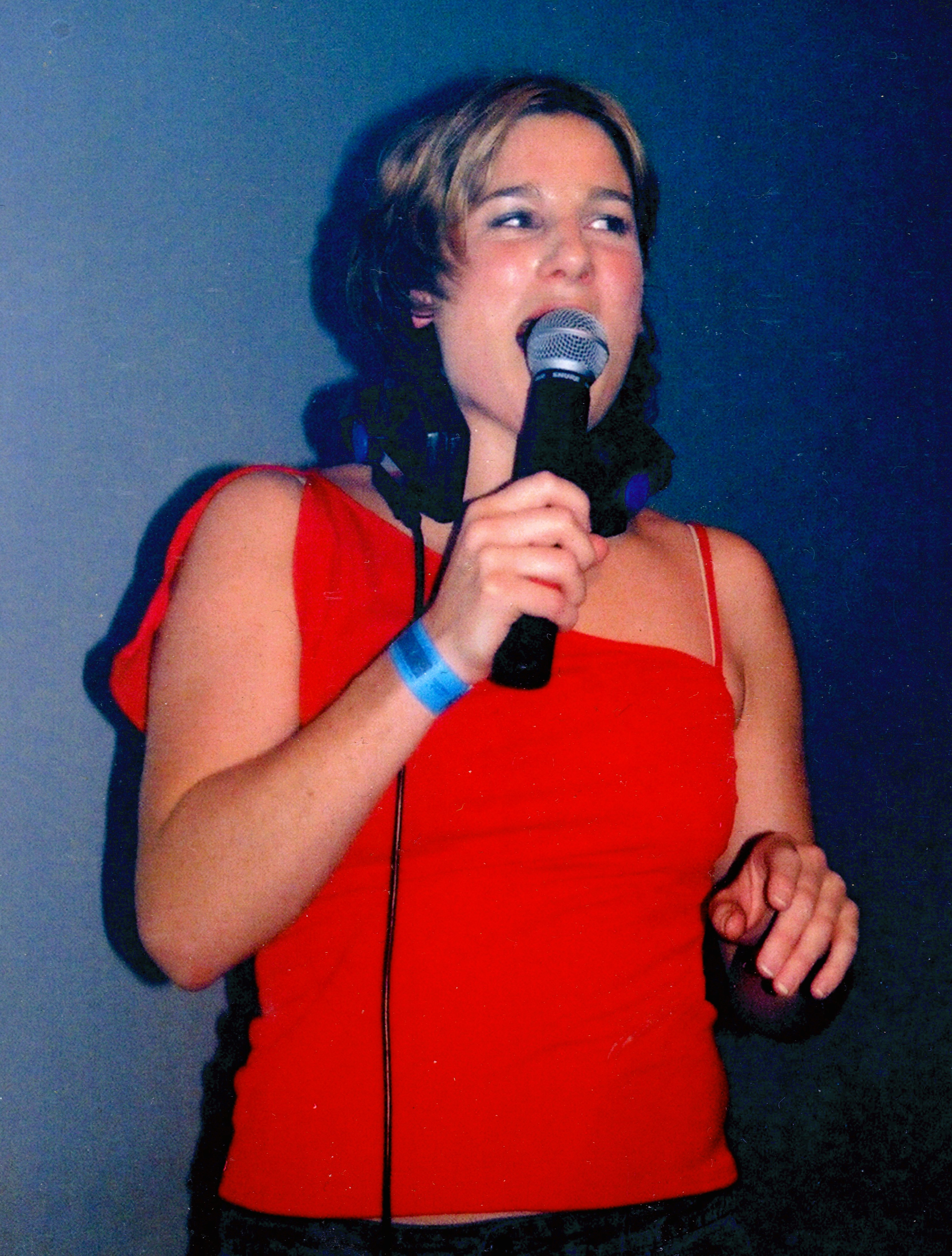
- Nemone presenting at Radio 1 live event in 2001
- Born: Nemone Metaxas; 3 November 1972 (age 53); Chester, England
- Other name: Nemone
- Education: Victoria University of Manchester
- Occupations: Radio presenter, disc jockey, television presenter, integrative psychotherapist
- Years active: 1996–present
- Children: 2

Nemone Metaxas (born 3 November 1972), often billed simply as Nemone, is an English DJ, radio presenter and television presenter. She is a former track and field athlete.

== Early life and family ==
Nemone was born 3 November 1972 in Chester, England. Her Greek father's maternal ancestral village is in Sykia (Συκέα) and the family name is Anastasakis.

== Career ==
=== Broadcasting ===
After finishing her degree in psychology at the Victoria University of Manchester in 1995, Nemone worked as a research assistant in a psychiatric ward. She went on to become a receptionist at Kiss 102 in Manchester where she learned production and broadcasting skills in her spare time. In 1997, she became the presenter and producer of The Word radio programme as Kiss 105 went on the air. She subsequently presented Galaxy 102 FM's Morning Show, Network Chill Out Show and The Galaxy Chart for Manchester. She later left as the anchor of the Morning Show for a job at BBC Radio 1.

Nemone joined BBC Radio 1 in October 2000 initially hosting the Saturday breakfast show. She filled in for Jo Whiley's weekday morning show in 2001 while Whiley was on maternity leave. She then took the weekend afternoon slot which she hosted from Autumn 2001 through to the end of 2003. After a revamp of the Radio 1 daytime schedule from early 2004, Nemone replaced Scott Mills on the overnight show (4 am – 7 am). She left Radio 1 in September 2005; Jason King, Joel Ross, Fearne Cotton, and Reggie Yates took over her early morning slot.

Nemone joined BBC Radio 6 Music on 3 October 2005, she began presenting the Dream Ticket show as well as filling in on 6 Music's drive time show when Steve Lamacq was away. Nemone took over Vic McGlynn's weekday lunchtime show, weekdays in the 3 – 4 pm slot on 4 September 2006. She could also be heard covering various shows on BBC Radio 2. Cerys Matthews filled in for her after she began six months maternity leave on 6 July 2009. After Matthews herself went on maternity leave on 24 November, the show was presented by either Chris Hawkins or Andrew Collins. In July 2009, Nemone gave birth to a baby girl and returned to the station on 1 February 2010.

When pregnant with her second child in 2011, Nemone moved from weekdays to take over the weekend breakfast show. She returned after a short maternity leave.

In April 2013, Nemone started to present a specialist dance and electronic music show on BBC Radio 6 Music – Nemone's Electric Ladyland, later The 6 Mix with Nemone. The 6 Mix with Nemone ended 27 March 2021.

Nemone has broadcast on BBC Radio 4.

Nemone participated with her daughter in the Bumps & Babies Mile in Battersea Park for Sport Relief 2010 along with Denise Van Outen, Carly Cole, Gail Emms, Natasha Kaplinsky and Kim Medcalf.

=== Television ===
Nemone co-hosted the BBC One television programme 101 Ways to Leave a Gameshow alongside Steve Jones.

Nemone was one of the contestants on Celebrity Mastermind aired on 20 August 2017 on BBC One. Her specialist subject was the children's books of Roald Dahl, and she came 2nd in the show.

Also, on screen, Nemone has hosted the X Games in Barcelona and Ski Sunday in Livigno for the television show Grandstand.

=== Athletics ===
Nemone is a former champion 400 metres runner. In 1999 she won the Greater Manchester Championships. In 2000 she qualified for the British Championships and competed in the 400m British Olympic trials.

Nemone decided to bid to run for the Greek Olympic team for the 2004 Summer Olympics. Her training was filmed for the BBC Three television programme My Big Fat Greek Olympic Dream.
