= Steve Sutherland (DJ) =

British DJ (died 2020)

Steve "Smooth" Sutherland (15 July 1961 – 10 July 2020) was a British DJ. He produced music in various genres, including R&B Hip Hop, 2 step vocals, 4x4, and grime.

== DJ career and radio shows ==
Sutherland was a club DJ, radio presenter, voiceover artist, and television presenter. He did much work in clubs and radio shows within the Urban genre. He has released 12 'live' studio albums, seven of which have reached the Top 40 compilation charts in the UK. Sutherland has won four MOBO Awards.

Sutherland got his first break in radio via an introduction from the former BBC Radio 1 producer Ivor Etienne, (who dubbed him 'Steve 'Smooth' Sutherland'), to the former controller of Radio 1, Matthew Bannister, to host a four-hour radio show encompassing Hip Hop, R&B, Soul, UK Garage, Dancehall and House. He enlisted Seamus Haji after that brief foray and did various radio mixes for Kiss 100, before London's Choice FM approached him in 2000. He then brought co-host Asha on board; the duo had one of the most successful shows on Choices' new sister station Choice 107.1, with two shows during the week. Sutherland quickly picked up on the craft of running a successful radio program and went on to guest-host other shows on Choice FM 96.9.

After only five months at Choice FM, he won his 1st best DJ award at the MOBO Awards ceremony, where he was approached by various radio stations. He left Choice FM to host a networked Sunday show on Galaxy FM and was offered the 9 pm – 1 am time slot, following the stations headlining talent Hed Kandi. The popularity of his radio show quickly began to overtake competitive shows on other stations (in the Rajarratings), where he quickly gained a large fan base. The Steve Sutherland Show broadcast every Saturday and Sunday night on the entire Galaxy Network (Galaxy Birmingham, Galaxy Manchester, Galaxy North East, Galaxy Scotland, Galaxy South Coast, Galaxy Yorkshire and Galaxy Digital).

On 1 December 2008, Global Radio, owners of Galaxy Radio, suspended Sutherland along with his producer, after a number of listeners complained about offensive lyrics on a song played on his Saturday night show at 9:58 pm on 29 November 2008. The song was "Arab Money" by Busta Rhymes. Following a one-week suspension and a full investigation, Ofcom, the independent regulator and competition authority for the UK communications industries, deemed that Sutherland and Galaxy Radio were not in breach of industry codes or regulations. The report concluded that "the programme was not in breach of Rule 2.3" and "noted that the practice of sampling content from a diverse range of sources is common in this genre of music."

Sutherland's weekly shows on 'Galaxy FM' continued until the station network was rebranded Capital FM in 2011.

A founding DJ of urban club brand Twice As Nice, he held residencies at Pacha Ibiza, Ministry of Sound, Gatecrasher and Cookies and Cream London.

== Death ==
Sutherland died on 10 July 2020, aged 58.

== Awards ==
- 2000: Sutherland was voted winner of the "Best Club DJ" at the MOBO Awards in London.
- 2002: Steve Sutherland was voted winner of the "Best Club & Radio DJ" at the MOBO Awards
- 2004: Sutherland was voted winner of the "Best Club DJ" at the MOBO Awards
- 2006: Sutherland was voted winner of the "Best Club & Radio DJ" at the MOBO Awards
