= Colourful Radio =

Commercial radio station

- England
- Broadcast area: London, Birmingham, Manchester
- Frequency: DAB

Programming
- Format: Soul / Reggae / Speech

History
- First air date: 30 May 2006 (commercial broadcast)

Links
- Website: www.colourfulradio.com

Colourful Radio is a UK commercial radio station broadcasting on DAB across London, Birmingham, Manchester as well as online. Colourful Radio's output is split between news, current affairs and urban music hit-list.

== History ==
Founded in 2002 by Kofi Kusitor MBE, Colourful Radio was officially revealed in January 2004 as one of the UK's first internet audio streams. Legal commercial broadcast licences for London-wide and UK DAB were also gained in the same year.

In September 2005, Henry Bonsu (former presenter on BBC London 94.9) joined the station as presenter of its Drivetime show.

Following a live presenter-led pilot in October 2005, Colourful Radio officially launched as a fully-fledged legal commercial radio station on 30 May 2006 with a mostly speech-heavy schedule online and on BSKYB satellite.

In August 2008, Gordon Mac (formerly director of Kiss FM) joined to refresh the station line up and help improve its music output.

Colourful Radio officially launched on London DAB on 2 March 2009, with Gordon Mac as Head of Station, and Henry Bonsu as Director and Head of Programmes.

In June 2011, Gordon Mac decided to leave Colourful in order to start a new venture Mi-Soul.

The demise of Choice FM in October 2013, left Colourful Radio as the only legal commercial radio station in the black music market.

In 2014, the station moved to new studios in Southwark.
