= Galaxy (radio network) =

- United Kingdom
- Broadcast area: Birmingham, South Wales, County Durham, Hampshire, Isle of Wight, Manchester, Northumberland, Glasgow for (Scotland), Tyne and Wear, Yorkshire, UK
- Frequencies: FM: 100-106 MHz, DAB in some areas, Virgin Media - 919; RDS: _Galaxy_ or Galaxy__
- Branding: '*TSA's* No.1 Hit Music Station'

Programming
- Language: English
- Format: Rhythmic CHR

Ownership
- Owner: Global Radio
- Sister stations: Heart, The Hit Music Network

History
- First air date: 28 April 2008
- Last air date: 3 January 2011

Links
- Website: Galaxy Radio (Redirects to Capital FM)

Galaxy was a radio network owned by Global Radio and broadcast across the British Isles on FM in regional areas of England and Scotland, through the digital platform with Sky and DAB and online respectively. Local relays included: Galaxy Birmingham, Galaxy Manchester, Galaxy North East, Galaxy Scotland, Galaxy South Coast and Galaxy Yorkshire. Programming was networked throughout the stations from Leeds – excluding weekday breakfast/drivetime and weekend mornings. On Monday 28 April 2008, Galaxy was rebranded as a mainstream station by Creative Spark, with a brand new layout including a fresh logo and a completely new show schedule.

Galaxy Scotland (formerly known as XFM Scotland), launched on Saturday 7 November 2008, and Galaxy South Coast (rebranded from Power FM), launched on Saturday 22 November 2008, as the two new radio stations to join the Galaxy Network which was part of Global Radio's plans to simplify radio stations they own and expand other radio stations across the UK.

Galaxy used RCS Selector and Master Control as its music playout system. According to RAJAR figures, Galaxy was the 7th most listened to radio station in the UK.

The network was rebranded and merged with The Hit Music Network on 3 January 2011 to form The Capital FM Network, comprising nine stations in London, Scotland, South East Wales, the West & East Midlands and northern & southern England broadcasting under the Capital FM identity. Local programming on the hit music stations is now restricted to news bulletins, with breakfast and drive shows coming from Leicester Square.

== History ==
The first Galaxy station, Galaxy Radio was launched in 1990 in Bristol broadcasting from studios in Portland Square on the 97.2 FM frequency. The station became a key rival to the city's GWR FM station and was operated by the Chiltern Radio Group under the "Hot FM" brand. The line up at the time included Andy Gelder, Rik Scott, Keith Francis (Gooden) Station and programme manager, Andy Beeley, Tristan B, Bob Prince, Tin Tin and Roni Size. It quickly became the most successful dance music station in the UK and was reaching half of all 16- to 24-year-olds in the city every week. In 1994, the station was awarded the licence to broadcast on the new Severn Estuary frequency on 101 MHz serving South Wales and the West of England areas and was rebranded as Galaxy 101. Chrysalis Radio purchased the station in 1996 and in 1997 expanded the network by buying the Faze FM operated stations which were Kiss 102 in Manchester (which became Galaxy Manchester) and Kiss 105 in Yorkshire (which became Galaxy Yorkshire) respectively. In 1998, black community station Choice FM was acquired in Birmingham and became Galaxy Birmingham. Chrysalis Radio scored another success in 1999 with the Radio Authority's award of the North East regional licence to Galaxy North East. However, Galaxy 101's success in Bristol was starting to falter, and the station was sold to the GWR Group in 2002, becoming Vibe 101 (now Kiss 101). On 7 November 2008, Xfm Scotland became Galaxy Scotland after Global Radio purchased GCap.

With Galaxy renaming their stations in 2006 to their respective areas of Birmingham, Manchester, North East, Yorkshire and Digital, they introduced a new "Up for It" image but at the same time being a more grown-up station. This is reflective in Galaxy's demographic now increasing from the 15–29 age range to the 15–34 age range.

The owners of Galaxy, Global Radio, did have aims to expand the radio brand across the UK by introducing new stations but only two occurred for Scotland with Galaxy Scotland and for the south coast of England with Galaxy South Coast before it was decided to roll out the Capital FM brand instead.

In August 2009, following Chill being taken off air, Galaxy replaced the station on numerous networks in different areas including Bournemouth, Cambridge, Cardiff, Norwich, Peterborough, Southend and more.

Until 14 November 2010, Galaxy Yorkshire was available on Sky channel 0112 and Virgin Media channel 919. Galaxy was due to be available on various platforms like Freeview, (channel 724) and Freesat. but never came into effect.

=== Strapline ===
Galaxy has gone through various strap-lines. From "Today's Dance Non-Stop", to "Today's Best Dance & More" to "The New Mix" to "No. 1 for Dance & RnB". Then, on Friday 21 March 2008, the radio station changed their "Passion for Music, Passion for Life" strap-line slogan to "Love Music".

As of 11 July 2010, Galaxy changed its slogan to "TSA's No. 1 Hit Music Station" inline with Capital London.

=== Revival within Global Player ===
On 7 July 2023, the Galaxy brand, having retired twelve years prior, returned to use with the launch of a new 'Live Playlist' stream on Global Player called "Galaxy of Stars", including predominantly chart dance and RnB tracks from Galaxy's heyday in the 90s and 00s.

== Galaxy Dance Anthems ==
In 2007, Galaxy released a three-disc box set called Galaxy Dance Anthems featuring 50 club classics.

== Galaxy Chart Shows ==
The first chart show to be broadcast on Galaxy Radio was Hit40UK. After this, the Fresh 40 chart was broadcast across the brand, but was cancelled soon after. A replacement chart, The Galaxy 40, was introduced and produced by Galaxy Radio. It was networked across all Galaxy radio stations. The chart show consisted of the latest and most popular dance, R&B, rap and pop hits from Galaxy stations and the public. The final Galaxy 40 show was broadcast on 7 June 2009, leaving the commercial Big Top 40 Show to take over the airwaves, although unlike the Fresh 40 and the Galaxy 40, Big Top 40 is based on iTunes downloads and airplay.

== Programming ==
The Galaxy Network schedule in December 2010 was:

=== Networked presenters ===
- Greg Hughes (weekday overnights & early breakfast)
- Sacha Brooks (weekday and Saturday mornings)
- Ant Payne (weekday and Saturday afternoons)
- Adele Roberts (Sunday to Thursday nights, Sunday overnight)
- Andi Durrant (Friday mid-evening, Saturday evening)
- Martyn 'Mash' Henderson (Friday night)
- David 'Nu Cool' Dunne (Saturday overnight)
- Adam O'Neil (Saturday drivetime)
- Steve Sutherland (Saturday night)
- Tiësto (Sunday early overnight)
- James Cusack (Saturday breakfast)
- Carl Hughes (Saturday afternoon)
- Wayne C McDonald (Tuesday night)

=== Syndicated presenters ===
- Rich Clarke (The Vodafone Big Top 40)
- Kat Shoob (The Vodafone Big Top 40)

=== Former presenters ===
- Keith Francis (Gooden)
- Rik Scott
- Andy Beeley
- Steve Martin UK
- Richard Forrest UK

- Miranda Rae (British radio DJ)

=== Note(s) ===
- Philippa Collins and Mark Chadwick were the voiceover artists for Galaxy during its "No.1 for Dance & RnB" era (c.2005–2006), continuing through the "Passion for Music, Passion for Life" strap-line refresh. Prior to Mark, Paul Hayes was the male station voice. In late 2006, Galaxy began its transition to Dan Lee as the station's male voice with him introducing new tracks and voicing promos. The following year, Lola Rose-Maxwell joined him after Philippa Collins departed to become the voice of XFM (now Radio X). Together, Dan and Lola formed Galaxy's final voiceover duo, remaining the station voices throughout the "Love Music" era and the later "TSA's No.1 Hit Music Station" strap-line changes.
- The Monday to Friday 0100 – 0400 slot was presented by Tom Ferguson until his departure to Channel 4 Radio.
- Matt Spokes was the presenter of Monday to Saturday afternoons until his departure to Key 103. Interim cover was provided by Sunday afternoon presenter Ant Payne from November 2010 with Payne's original slot covered by various DJ's.
- Michael Blades, Matt Foister, Carl Hughes and Will Smith were cover presenters in the latter half of 2010; with contracted DJ's leaving or absent.

== Capital ==
On 3 January 2011, The Galaxy Network and The Hit Music Network merged to create Capital, with the branding of "95 – 106 Capital FM, The UK's No.1 Hit Music Station" but the stations ID locally as [freq] Capital. Local news hours have been extended and local advertising remains locally sold. All programming, with the exception of weekday breakfast/drivetime and weekend afternoons, originates from Capital studios in Leicester Square, London. Specialist dance music programming remains on overnights excluding Sunday. Galaxy fell silent on 30 June 2015 when a MXR Yorkshire ensembles was closed and Capital moving to local multiplexes.
