= Capital Birmingham =

Birmingham; England
- Broadcast area: Birmingham
- Frequencies: FM: 102.2 MHz; RDS: Capital; DAB

Programming
- Format: Contemporary hit radio / Urban contemporary

Ownership
- Owner: Global
- Sister stations: Heart West Midlands; Smooth West Midlands

History
- First air date: 1 January 1995
- Last air date: 8 April 2019

Technical information
- Transmitter coordinates: 52.4732°N 1.9194°W

Links
- Website: Capital Birmingham

Capital Birmingham was a local radio station owned and operated by Global as part of the Capital radio network. It broadcasts to Birmingham from studios at Brindleyplace in Birmingham City Centre.

In April 2019, Capital Birmingham was merged with a sister station in the East Midlands to form Capital Midlands.

== History ==
The station began broadcasting as Choice FM on 1 January 1995, after taking over the licence previously operated by Buzz FM. Four years later, Choice was renamed as Galaxy after it was bought out by Chrysalis. Galaxy was sold off to Global Radio in June 2007 in a £170 million deal which saw the group take over The Arrow, LBC and Heart.

The station was relaunched and re-branded as 102.2 Capital on 3 January 2011 as part of a merger of Global Radio's Galaxy and Hit Music networks to form the nine-station Capital radio network. In April 2013, the station along with Heart West Midlands moved to new studios at Eleven Brindleyplace in central Birmingham.

=== Station merger ===
On 26 February 2019, Global confirmed the station would be merged with Capital East Midlands. As of Monday 8 April 2019, the regional output consists of a three-hour Drivetime show on weekdays, alongside news bulletins, traffic updates and advertising. Local breakfast and weekend shows were replaced with networked programming from London.

== Format ==
Unlike other stations on the Capital network, the 102.2 Capital licence was to cater primarily for Urban contemporary black music rather than a 'contemporary/chart music-led service'. The radio station format stated that the service should provide 'a rhythmic-based music and information stations primarily for listeners of African or afro-Caribbean origin, but with cross over appeal to young white fans of urban contemporary black music'.

On 1 July 2011, Global Radio requested to change the formats of Capital Birmingham and Capital Scotland which have obligations from previous owners - this is to enable all nine Capital stations to be inline. On 17 November 2011 it was announced Ofcom approved two format change requests.

In February 2014, the station resumed opting out of networked programming for two hours each week, broadcasting an overnight specialist show featuring Afro-Caribbean music.

Capital Birmingham's transmitter is located at Metropolitan House on the A456. It is also available on DAB via the Birmingham, Coventry, and Wolverhampton, Shrewsbury and Telford multiplexes.

== Notable former presenters ==
- Edith Bowman
- Sacha Brooks
- Rich Clarke
- David Dunne
- Andi Durrant
- Stephanie Hirst
- Dave Kelly
- Adele Roberts
- Steve Sutherland
- Margherita Taylor
- Tiësto
