= Paul 'Trouble' Anderson =

- Born: 28 September 1959; East London, England
- Died: 2 December 2018 (aged 59)
- Genres: Soul, Disco, Funk, House
- Occupation(s): DJ, producer

Paul 'Trouble' Anderson (28 September 1959 – 2 December 2018) was a British DJ, playing soul, disco, funk, and house music and known for his long-running Kiss FM show. He worked as a dance music DJ in clubs from 1979 until his death in 2018. He produced a number of mix albums and remixed records by other artists.

== Biography ==
Anderson was born in East London.

In 1985 he helped found Kiss FM, the UK's first legal dance music radio station, with Gordon Mac. From 1990 to 1998 he hosted a prime time Saturday Kiss FM show from 9 to 11 pm. Mixmag called the show "the official start to any night out happening in London Town during the 1990s"; Radio Today called it "a pre-clubbing ritual for a whole generation of nineties Londoners"; Greg Wilson called it "something of a pre-clubbing institution for Londoners, Paul undoubtedly one of the most influential DJs of the period."

From 2012 up until his death, Anderson played on Mi-Soul, the London radio station set-up by Mac.

He died on 2 December 2018, aged 59.

== Discography ==
=== Mix albums ===
- The Sound Of New York (Eightball, 1994)
- Creative Garage (with Noel Watson) (Club Masters, 1996)
- Trouble On The Dancefloor (X:treme, 1997)
- Trouble's House (R2, 2000)

=== Compilation albums ===
- Classic House Mastercuts Volume 2 (Mastercuts, 1994)

=== Singles ===
- "Greedy T" (Unquantize, 2017)
