= 1997 in British music =

This is a summary of 1997 in music in the United Kingdom, including the official charts from that year.

== Summary ==
Oasis released their highly anticipated third album, Be Here Now, on 21 August (in the UK). It sold 695,761 copies in its first three days and 813,000 copies in its first week. As of 2023, it is the fastest-selling album in UK history. Radiohead's third album, OK Computer, was released in June and topped the UK Albums Chart for two weeks. Met with widespread critical acclaim, it was voted the greatest album of all time by Q Magazine readers barely months after its release.

Compared to just five years earlier, singles sales were very high this year. From 22 June right through to the end of the year, every single #1 sold at least 100,000 copies a week. Like the previous year, 24 singles topped the chart, double as many as 1992.

The Spice Girls continued their success from 1996, once again getting three number ones. The first was the double A-side songs "Mama" and "Who Do You Think You Are"; the latter of which was the Comic Relief single for 1997. This ensured the group became the first act to have their first four singles all reach number 1. This was followed by "Spice Up Your Life" in October, and "Too Much" in December, which once again gave them the Christmas number one single. They had now become the first act to have their first six singles reach number 1, but this run would be broken in 1998, with "Stop" only reaching #2. Spice Girls also had great success on the album charts as Spice and Spiceworld were two of the top five best sellers of 1997.

The Backstreet Boys released their second international album Backstreet's Back. The album was a massive success reaching number two and selling over 800,000 copies in the U.K. The three singles released from the album were massive hits with "Everybody (Backstreet's Back)" reaching number 3 and "As Long as You Love Me" also reaching number three and staying in the charts for 19 weeks.

Six singles released this year went on to sell over a million. The first to do so was Puff Daddy & Faith Evans' "I'll Be Missing You", a tribute to the late rapper The Notorious B.I.G. In November and December, three consecutive number ones all sold over a million, for only the third time in UK chart history (it had previously happened in 1984 and 1995/6). These were Aqua's "Barbie Girl", the Children in Need charity single "Perfect Day", and "Teletubbies say "Eh-oh!", the theme tune to the popular children's television series Teletubbies. In addition, All Saints' "Never Ever" was released in November and also sold over a million, though it wouldn't reach number one until January 1998.

In November, The Prodigy released "Smack My Bitch Up", which received huge international media attention, due to the fact that many people believed it to be misogynistic and / or that it promotes violence against women. Some stores refused to stock the single and / or album from which it came, and some radio stations refused to play it. A graphic video showing bad behaviour on the part of the protagonist in the music video led to its showing on television being greatly restricted.

By far the biggest-selling single of the year, though, came from Elton John. In August, Diana, Princess of Wales, was killed in a car crash. At her funeral, John played a rewritten version of "Candle in the Wind" known as "Candle in the Wind 1997", a song originally written about Marilyn Monroe (made #11 in 1974, with a live version reaching #5 in 1988). When released this year, it quickly overtook 1984's "Do They Know It's Christmas?" to become the biggest selling UK single ever, selling 4.86 million copies, and the biggest selling in the world, selling 37 million. It continues to hold the record to this day.

Andrew Glover's string quartet The Fickle Virgin of Seventeen Summers was one of several new classical works by British composers. Others included Geoffrey Burgon's City Adventures, a percussion concerto written for Scottish virtuoso Evelyn Glennie and premièred by her during the 1997 Proms season. One of the UK's most prolific classical composers, Wilfred Josephs, died on 17 November. In April, Nigel Kennedy, now calling himself simply Kennedy, returned to the stage at the Royal Festival Hall after a five-year absence from the concert stage resulting from neck surgery. Towards the end of the year, veteran composer Sir Michael Tippett developed pneumonia while visiting Sweden, which would lead to his death early in 1998.

== Events ==
- 9 January – David Bowie performs his 50th Birthday Bash concert (the day after his birthday) at Madison Square Garden, New York City, USA with guests Frank Black, the Foo Fighters, Sonic Youth, Robert Smith of the Cure, Lou Reed, and Billy Corgan of the Smashing Pumpkins, with the opening act Placebo. Proceeds from the concert went to the Save the Children fund.
- 30 January – Noel Gallagher courts controversy in an interview in which he claimed that taking drugs was "like having a cup of tea in the morning".
- 12 February – David Bowie receives a star on the Hollywood Walk of Fame in Hollywood, USA.
- 18 February – Brian Harvey is sacked from East 17 after his controversial comments on a radio interview in which he appeared to be condoning the use of the drug ecstasy.
- 11 March – Paul McCartney receives his knighthood from Queen Elizabeth II.
- 30 March – The Spice Girls launch Britain's new television channel, Channel 5.
- 10 April – Nigel Kennedy, now calling himself simply Kennedy, returns to the stage at the Royal Festival Hall after a five-year absence from the concert stage resulting from neck surgery.
- 3 May
  - Five's musical career begins after auditions are held in London, UK to find potential band members, with over 3,000 hopefuls showing up to audition.
  - The Spice Girls attend the Cannes Film Festival to announce their plans to hit the big screen with Spiceworld: The Movie. A photo call on top of the Hotel Martinez entrance brings the area to a standstill.
  - At the 42nd Eurovision Song Contest, held in Dublin's Point Theatre, the UK win with "Love Shine a Light", sung by Katrina and the Waves.
- 11 May – The Spice Girls perform their first British live gig for the Prince's Trust 21st anniversary concert at the Manchester Opera House They break royal protocol by kissing The Prince of Wales (now Charles III) on the cheeks and even pinching his bottom.
- 15 May
  - The Spice Girls' album Spice reaches number one on the US charts, making them the first British act to top the charts with a debut album.
  - While his single "Return of the Mack" climbs up the US Charts, Mark Morrison is sentenced to three months in prison, for threatening a police officer with a stun gun.
  - The Heroes Symphony by Philip Glass is performed for the first time at the Royal Festival Hall.
- 28 June – The Haçienda club in Manchester closes. It is later demolished and turned into flats, whilst still retaining the "Hacienda" name.
- September – Ten-year-old Nicola Benedetti begins her studies at the Yehudi Menuhin School for young musicians under Lord Menuhin and Natasha Boyarskaya.
- 6 September – Elton John performs "Candle in the Wind" at the Funeral of Diana, Princess of Wales; John Tavener's Song for Athene is performed at the same ceremony, with soprano Lynne Dawson as soloist.
- 13 September – Release of Elton John's "Candle in the Wind" remade as a charity tribute to Diana, Princess of Wales. It becomes the second best-selling single of all time worldwide, after "White Christmas".
- 14 August – Il Rozzo Martello for chorus by Peter Maxwell Davies, setting the words of Dante and Michelangelo, is performed for the first time in The Queen Elizabeth Hall, London.
- 28 September – The world premiere of James MacMillan’s Vigil Symphony, at the Barbican Centre, with the London Symphony Orchestra conducted by Mstislav Rostropovich.
- 1 October – Asyla for orchestra by Thomas Adès is performed for the first time, at Birmingham Symphony Hall.
- 6 October – Aphex Twin courts controversy with the video to his single "Come to Daddy'". The video is banned by TV networks for being "too frightening".
- 14 October – The world premiere of Paul McCartney's Standing Stone at the Royal Albert Hall with the London Symphony Orchestra and a 120 member choir, conducted by Lawrence Foster.
- 28 October – The Concerto Conciso for piano and ten players by Thomas Adès is performed for the first time in Birmingham.
- 3 November – The Spice Girls release Spiceworld, their second number-one album, making the group the first British band since the Beatles to have two albums in the US chart at the same time. Spice and Spiceworld have amassed enough sales for one out of every two people in Britain to own a Spice Girls album.
- 6 November – The Spice Girls make the decision to take over the running of the group and drop Simon Fuller as their manager.
- 9 November – Sufi Dance for guitar by Jonathan Harvey is performed for the first time, at Nottingham University.
- 17 November – The Prodigy release their controversial single "Smack My Bitch Up", which is censored by BBC Radio 1, and the X-rated video is banned from daytime television, except for a brief, late-night rotation on MTV before being removed from broadcast two weeks later.
- 20 November – Gary Glitter is arrested after indecent images were found on his computer that he took to a branch of PC World in Bristol for repair. His planned performance for Children in Need is cancelled, and his appearance in Spiceworld: The Movie is removed from the film as a result.
- 29 November – The Verve and their manager refuse to allow The Chart Show to show the video for their song "Lucky Man" unless the show is redesigned for them.
- 4 and 5 December – Black Sabbath perform a pair of reunion shows in their hometown of Birmingham, England. They are the first full-length concerts by the original lineup of the band since 1978.
- 26 December – The Spice Girls release their big screen debut Spiceworld: The Movie, starring Richard E. Grant, Roger Moore, Elton John and Stephen Fry. The movie makes £6.8m in its first week of release.
- 31 December – Composers Richard Rodney Bennett and Elton John are among those receiving knighthoods in the New Year's Honours List.

== Charts ==
=== Number-one singles ===
Chart date (week ending)	Song	Artist(s)	Sales
4 January	"2 Become 1"	Spice Girls	301,000
11 January	"2 Become 1"	Spice Girls	113,000
18 January	"Professional Widow"	Tori Amos	80,000
25 January	"Your Woman"	White Town	119,500
1 February	"Beetlebum"	Blur	120,000
8 February	"Ain't Nobody"	LL Cool J	80,000
15 February	"Discothèque"	U2	125,000
22 February	"Don't Speak"	No Doubt	195,000
1 March	"Don't Speak"	No Doubt	140,000
8 March	"Don't Speak"	No Doubt	85,000
15 March	"Mama" / "Who Do You Think You Are"	Spice Girls	248,000
22 March	"Mama" / "Who Do You Think You Are"	Spice Girls	152,000
29 March	"Mama" / "Who Do You Think You Are"	Spice Girls	85,000
5 April	"Block Rockin' Beats"	The Chemical Brothers	84,700
12 April	"I Believe I Can Fly"	R. Kelly	51,000
19 April	"I Believe I Can Fly"	R. Kelly	76,000
26 April	"I Believe I Can Fly"	R. Kelly	87,000
3 May	"Blood on the Dance Floor"	Michael Jackson	85,000
10 May	"Love Won't Wait"	Gary Barlow	92,000
17 May	"You're Not Alone"	Olive	75,000
24 May	"You're Not Alone"	Olive	74,000
31 May	"I Wanna Be the Only One"	Eternal featuring Bebe Winans	150,000
7 June	"MMMBop"	Hanson	260,000
14 June	"MMMBop"	Hanson	120,000
21 June	"MMMBop"	Hanson	86,000
28 June	"I'll Be Missing You"	Puff Daddy & Faith Evans featuring 112	109,000
5 July	"I'll Be Missing You"	Puff Daddy & Faith Evans featuring 112	156,000
12 July	"I'll Be Missing You"	Puff Daddy & Faith Evans featuring 112	167,000
19 July	"D'You Know What I Mean?"	Oasis	377,000
26 July	"I'll Be Missing You"	Puff Daddy & Faith Evans featuring 112	124,000
2 August	"I'll Be Missing You"	Puff Daddy & Faith Evans featuring 112	127,000
9 August	"I'll Be Missing You"	Puff Daddy & Faith Evans featuring 112	100,000
16 August	"Men in Black"	Will Smith	182,000
23 August	"Men in Black"	Will Smith	133,000
30 August	"Men in Black"	Will Smith	122,000
6 September	"Men in Black"	Will Smith	105,000
13 September	"The Drugs Don't Work"	The Verve	105,000
20 September	"Candle in the Wind 1997" / "Something About the Way You Look Tonight"	Elton John	658,000
27 September	"Candle in the Wind 1997" / "Something About the Way You Look Tonight"	Elton John	1,546,688
4 October	"Candle in the Wind 1997" / "Something About the Way You Look Tonight"	Elton John	1,067,000
11 October	"Candle in the Wind 1997" / "Something About the Way You Look Tonight"	Elton John	572,000
18 October	"Candle in the Wind 1997" / "Something About the Way You Look Tonight"	Elton John	274,000
25 October	"Spice Up Your Life"	Spice Girls	321,000
1 November	"Barbie Girl"	Aqua	190,000
8 November	"Barbie Girl"	Aqua	239,000
15 November	"Barbie Girl"	Aqua	190,000
22 November	"Barbie Girl"	Aqua	165,000
29 November	"Perfect Day"	Various Artists	385,082
6 December	"Perfect Day"	Various Artists	274,706
13 December	"Teletubbies say "Eh-oh!""	Teletubbies	317,000
20 December	"Teletubbies say "Eh-oh!""	Teletubbies	230,000
27 December	"Too Much"	Spice Girls	252,000

=== Number-one albums ===
Chart date (week ending)	Album	Artist	Sales
4 January	Spice	Spice Girls	375,000
11 January	Spice	Spice Girls	119,000
18 January	Spice	Spice Girls	65,000
25 January	Spice	Spice Girls	54,000
1 February	Evita	Madonna	49,000
8 February	Glow	Reef	55,000
15 February	White on Blonde	Texas	47,000
22 February	Blur	Blur	92,000
1 March	Attack of the Grey Lantern	Mansun	48,000
8 March	Spice	Spice Girls	72,000
15 March	Pop	U2	152,000
22 March	Spice	Spice Girls	62,000
29 March	Spice	Spice Girls	65,000
5 April	Spice	Spice Girls	85,000
12 April	Spice	Spice Girls	59,000
19 April	Dig Your Own Hole	The Chemical Brothers	62,793
26 April	Ultra	Depeche Mode	43,000
3 May	Tellin' Stories	The Charlatans	68,000
10 May	Tellin' Stories	The Charlatans	33,000
17 May	Spice	Spice Girls	23,700
24 May	Blood on the Dance Floor: HIStory in the Mix	Michael Jackson	37,000
31 May	Blood on the Dance Floor: HIStory in the Mix	Michael Jackson	30,000
7 June	Open Road	Gary Barlow	58,000
14 June	Wu-Tang Forever	Wu-Tang Clan	26,000
21 June	Middle of Nowhere	Hanson	24,000
28 June	OK Computer	Radiohead	136,500
5 July	OK Computer	Radiohead	48,200
12 July	The Fat of the Land	The Prodigy	316,951
19 July	The Fat of the Land	The Prodigy	98,000
26 July	The Fat of the Land	The Prodigy	66,000
2 August	The Fat of the Land	The Prodigy	49,000
9 August	The Fat of the Land	The Prodigy	36,000
16 August	The Fat of the Land	The Prodigy	30,500
23 August	White on Blonde	Texas	30,000
30 August	Be Here Now	Oasis	696,000
6 September	Be Here Now	Oasis	235,000
13 September	Be Here Now	Oasis	95,000
20 September	Be Here Now	Oasis	64,000
27 September	Marchin' Already	Ocean Colour Scene	64,000
4 October	Be Here Now	Oasis	48,000
11 October	Urban Hymns	The Verve	250,054
18 October	Urban Hymns	The Verve	97,000
25 October	Urban Hymns	The Verve	63,500
1 November	Urban Hymns	The Verve	56,000
8 November	Urban Hymns	The Verve	61,000
15 November	Spiceworld	Spice Girls	192,000
22 November	Spiceworld	Spice Girls	91,228
29 November	Let's Talk About Love	Céline Dion	91,000
6 December	Let's Talk About Love	Céline Dion	91,000
13 December	Spiceworld	Spice Girls	121,000
20 December	Let's Talk About Love	Céline Dion	142,000
27 December	Let's Talk About Love	Céline Dion	219,918

=== Number-one compilation albums ===
Chart date (week ending)	Album
4 January	Now 35
11 January	Now 35
18 January	The Annual II Mixed by Judge Jules & Boy George
25 January	The Annual II Mixed by Judge Jules & Boy George
1 February	The Annual II Mixed by Judge Jules & Boy George
8 February	The Annual II Mixed by Judge Jules & Boy George
15 February	In the Mix 97
22 February	The Annual II Mixed by Judge Jules & Boy George
1 March	Club Mix 97 2
8 March	Club Mix 97 2
15 March	The Soul Album
22 March	The Best Album in the World...Ever! 5
29 March	Dance Nation 3 – Pete Tong & Judge Jules
5 April	Now 36
12 April	Now 36
19 April	Now 36
26 April	New Hits 1997
3 May	New Hits 1997
10 May	New Hits 1997
17 May	New Hits 1997
24 May	Big Mix 97
31 May	Big Mix 97
7 June	Smash Hits Summer 97
14 June	The Best Club Anthems...Ever!
21 June	The Best Club Anthems...Ever!
28 June	The Best Club Anthems...Ever!
5 July	The Best Club Anthems...Ever!
12 July	The Best Disco Album in the World...Ever!
19 July	The Best Disco Album in the World...Ever!
26 July	Now 37
2 August	Now 37
9 August	Now 37
16 August	Now 37
23 August	Fresh Hits 1997
30 August	Fresh Hits 1997
6 September	Fresh Hits 1997
13 September	Ibiza Uncovered
20 September	Ibiza Uncovered
27 September	Ibiza Uncovered
4 October	Kiss in Ibiza 97
11 October	Ibiza Uncovered
18 October	Big Mix 97 – Volume 2
25 October	The Best Anthems...Ever!
1 November	Now Dance 97
8 November	Huge Hits 1997
15 November	The Annual III Mixed by Pete Tong & Boy George
22 November	The Annual III Mixed by Pete Tong & Boy George
29 November	Now 38
6 December	Now 38
13 December	Diana Princess of Wales – Tribute
20 December	Diana Princess of Wales – Tribute
27 December	Diana Princess of Wales – Tribute

== Year-end charts ==
=== Best-selling singles ===
Based on sales from 30 December 1996 to 28 December 1997.

No.	Title	Artist	Peak position	Sales
1	"Candle in the Wind 1997"/"Something About the Way You Look Tonight"	Elton John	1	4,770,000
2	"Barbie Girl"	Aqua	1	1,500,000
3	"I'll Be Missing You"	Puff Daddy & Faith Evans featuring 112	1	
4	"Perfect Day"	Various Artists	1	1,000,000+
5	"Teletubbies Say Eh-Oh!"	Teletubbies	1	
6	"Men in Black"	Will Smith	1	
7	"Don't Speak"	No Doubt	1	
8	"Torn"	Natalie Imbruglia	2	813,000
9	"Tubthumping"	Chumbawamba	2	
10	"Spice Up Your Life"	Spice Girls	1	
11	"MMMBop"	Hanson	1	
12	"D'You Know What I Mean?"	Oasis	1	
13	"Never Ever"	All Saints	3 (Note: Reached number 1 in 1998)	
14	"I Believe I Can Fly"	R. Kelly	1	
15	"Mama"/"Who Do You Think You Are"	Spice Girls	1	
16	"I Wanna Be the Only One"	Eternal featuring BeBe Winans	1	600,000+
17	"Freed from Desire"	Gala	2	
18	"Where Do You Go"	No Mercy	2	
19	"Sunchyme"	Dario G	2	
20	"Free"	Ultra Naté	4	
21	"Encore une fois"	Sash!	2	
22	"Too Much"	Spice Girls	1	
23	"Time to Say Goodbye (Con Te Partirò)"	Sarah Brightman & Andrea Bocelli	2	
24	"Bellissima"	DJ Quicksilver	4	
25	"As Long as You Love Me"	Backstreet Boys	3	
26	"Baby Can I Hold You"/"Shooting Star"	Boyzone	2	
27	"Ecuador"	Sash! featuring Rodriguez	2	
28	"Wind Beneath My Wings"	Steven Houghton	3	
29	"Don't Let Go (Love)"	En Vogue	5	
30	"Stay"	Sash! featuring La Trec	2	
31	"Lovefool"	The Cardigans	2	
32	"The Drugs Don't Work"	The Verve	1	
33	"Tell Him"	Barbra Streisand & Celine Dion	3	
34	"Together Again"	Janet Jackson	4	
35	"2 Become 1"	Spice Girls	1	
36	"You Might Need Somebody"	Shola Ama	4	
37	"You're Not Alone"	Olive	1	
38	"Everybody (Backstreet's Back)"	Backstreet Boys	3	
39	"Angels"	Robbie Williams	5 (Note: Reached number 4 in 1998)	
40	"C U When U Get There"	Coolio featuring 40 Thevz	3	
41	"Your Woman"	White Town	1	
42	"Never Gonna Let You Go"	Tina Moore	7	
43	"Bitter Sweet Symphony"	The Verve	2	
44	"Remember Me"	Blue Boy	8	
45	"Closer than Close"	Rosie Gaines	4	
46	"Stand by Me"	Oasis	2	
47	"Professional Widow (It's Got to Be Big)"	Tori Amos	1	
48	"Picture of You"	Boyzone	2	
49	"Say What You Want"	Texas	3	
50	"I'll Be There for You"	The Rembrandts	5 (Note: Reached number 3 in 1995)	

=== Best-selling albums ===
Based on sales from 30 December 1996 to 28 December 1997.

No.	Title	Artist	Peak position	Sales
1	Be Here Now	Oasis	1	1,500,000
2	Urban Hymns	The Verve	1	1,315,000
3	Spice	Spice Girls	1	1,230,000+
4	Spiceworld	Spice Girls	1	1,060,000+
5	White on Blonde	Texas	1	1,000,000+
6	The Fat of the Land	The Prodigy	1	
7	Let's Talk About Love	Celine Dion	1	
8	OK Computer	Radiohead	1	
9	Greatest Hits	Eternal	2	550,000
10	The Best of Wham!: If You Were There...	Wham!	4	
11	Ocean Drive	Lighthouse Family	3	
12	Backstreet's Back	Backstreet Boys	2	
13	Older	George Michael	7 (Note: Reached number 1 in 1996)	
14	Postcards from Heaven	Lighthouse Family	2	
15	Sheryl Crow	Sheryl Crow	5	
16	Travelling Without Moving	Jamiroquai	4 (Note: Reached number 2 in 1996)	
17	Fresco	M People	2	
18	Lennon Legend: The Very Best of John Lennon	John Lennon	4 (Note: Reached number 3 in 1998)	
19	Paint the Sky with Stars	Enya	4	
20	All Saints	All Saints	5 (Note: Reached number 2 in 1998)	
21	Blue Is the Colour	The Beautiful South	3 (Note: Reached number 1 in 1996)	
22	Like You Do... Best of the Lightning Seeds	The Lightning Seeds	5	
23	Evita	Madonna/Various Artists	1	
24	Everything Must Go	Manic Street Preachers	2	
25	Pop	U2	1	
26	Tragic Kingdom	No Doubt	3	
27	Falling into You	Celine Dion	2 (Note: Reached number 1 in 1995)	
28	Secrets	Toni Braxton	10	
29	Blur	Blur	1	
30	Their Greatest Hits	Hot Chocolate	10 (Note: Reached number 1 in 1993)	
31	Marchin' Already	Ocean Colour Scene	1	
32	Do It Yourself	The Seahorses	2	
33	Stoosh	Skunk Anansie	9	
34	Always on My Mind: Ultimate Love Songs	Elvis Presley	3	
35	(What's the Story) Morning Glory?	Oasis	17 (Note: Reached number 1 in 1995)	
36	Glow	Reef	1	
37	The Big Picture	Elton John	3	
38	Tellin' Stories	The Charlatans	1	
39	K	Kula Shaker	7 (Note: Reached number 1 in 1996)	
40	It's My Life – The Album	Sash!	6	
41	Left of the Middle	Natalie Imbruglia	5	
42	Before the Rain	Eternal	3	
43	Open Road	Gary Barlow	1	
44	Come Find Yourself	Fun Lovin' Criminals	7	
45	The Very Best of Sting & The Police	Sting & the Police	11 (Note: Reached number 1 in 2002)	
46	Jagged Little Pill	Alanis Morissette	11 (Note: Reached number 1 in 1996)	
47	Mother Nature Calls	Cast	3	
48	Shelter	The Brand New Heavies	5	
49	Dig Your Own Hole	The Chemical Brothers	1	
50	The Very Best of the Bee Gees	Bee Gees	11 (Note: Reached number 6 in 1990)	

=== Best-selling compilation albums ===
Based on sales from 30 December 1996 to 28 December 1997.

No.	Title	Peak position	Sales
1	Now 38	1	920,000
2	Diana, Princess of Wales: Tribute	1	700,000
3	Now 37	1	600,000
4	Now 36	1	600,000
5	The Annual III	1	400,000+
6	The Full Monty Original Soundtrack	3	350,000
7	The Greatest Hits of 1997	2	
8	The Best '60s Album in the World... Ever! III	5	
9	The Annual II	1	
10	Ibiza Uncovered	1	

== Classical music ==
- Thomas Adès – Asyla
- Geoffrey Burgon – City Adventures
- Peter Maxwell Davies – Concerto for Piano and Orchestra
- Alun Hoddinott – Spectrum 2: Lizard
- Graham Waterhouse – Celtic Voices and Hale Bopp

== Opera ==
- Mark-Anthony Turnage – Twice Through the Heart

== Musical films ==
- Cabaret Neiges Noires

== Births ==
- 23 January – Shaheen Jafargholi, actor and singer
- 18 February – Ramz, rapper and singer
- 16 February – Charlie Green, singer
- 7 April – Laura van der Heijden, cellist
- 7 July – James Marriott, musician and YouTuber
- 7 October – Lauren Platt, singer and 2014 X Factor semi-finalist
- 24 October – Raye, R&B singer-songwriter

== Deaths ==
- 22 January
  - Ivor Kirchin, bandleader, 92
  - Billy Mackenzie, singer-songwriter (Associates), 39 (suicide)
  - Wally Whyton, singer-songwriter and broadcaster (The Vipers Skiffle Group), 67
- 10 February – Brian Connolly, vocalist (The Sweet), 51 (liver failure)
- 18 February – Eric Fenby, music teacher, composer, and amanuensis of Frederick Delius, 90
- 7 March – Alfred Nieman, pianist and composer, 82
- 4 June – Ronnie Lane, bassist (The Small Faces), 51 (multiple sclerosis, pneumonia)
- 7 June – Paul Reade, composer, 54
- 19 July – Frank Farrell, bassist, vocalist and songwriter, 50
- 4 August – Alexander Young, singer-songwriter, 58 (lung cancer)
- 10 August – Conlon Nancarrow, composer, 84
- 4 September – Belle Stewart, Scottish singer, 91
- 8 September – Derek Taylor, press agent for the Beatles, 65
- 10 October – George Malcolm, pianist, organist, conductor and composer, 80
- 6 November – Epic Soundtracks, singer-songwriter and drummer (Swell Maps), 38 (cause unknown)
- 17 November – Wilfred Josephs, composer, 70
- 21 November – Robert Simpson, composer, 76
- 6 December – George Chisholm, Scottish jazz trombonist, 82
- 11 December – Simon Jeffes, classical guitarist, 48 (brain tumour)

== Music awards ==
=== Brit Awards ===
The 1997 Brit Awards winners were:

- Best British producer: John Leckie
- Best soundtrack: Trainspotting
- British album: Manic Street Preachers – Everything Must Go
- British breakthrough act: Kula Shaker
- British dance act: The Prodigy
- British female solo artist: Gabrielle
- British group: Manic Street Preachers
- British male solo artist: George Michael
- British single: Spice Girls – "Wannabe"
- British video: Spice Girls – "Say You'll Be There"
- International breakthrough act: Robert Miles
- International female: Sheryl Crow
- International group: The Fugees
- International male: Beck
- Outstanding contribution: Bee Gees

=== Mercury Music Prize ===
The 1997 Mercury Music Prize was awarded to Roni Size/Reprazent – New Forms.

== See also ==
- 1997 in British radio
- 1997 in British television
- 1997 in the United Kingdom
- List of British films of 1997
