= David Dunne (DJ) =

British DJ

- Born: 1962 (age 63–64)
- Occupations: DJ and Broadcaster

David Dunne (born 1962) is a UK Club DJ, radio presenter and former head of music at MTV from Manchester.

== Career ==
David Dunne's DJ career spans more than thirty years on radio and as a club DJ. In 1989, he found himself showcasing music from legendary clubs like the Hacienda on Manchester's Piccadilly Radio with his "Isometric Dance Class" show, which was the first show on legal FM radio in the UK solely dedicated to the new and growing genre of House music. At that time he gave DJs such as Justin Robertson, Mike Pickering and Jon DaSilva their first radio exposure. He moved to London in 1990 where he worked as a TV producer and then as a TV plugger for Phonogram records and was responsible for getting acts from the Talkin Loud stable, founded by Gilles Peterson, onto national TV.

In 1992, he moved back to Manchester to work for So What Arts, the management company for Simply Red and worked on their hugely successful "Stars" tour project.

In 1994, he then became one of the founder staff members at Faze FM who operated both Kiss 102 & Kiss 105 as Head of Music and Morning Presenter, programming the music and broadcasting on both stations in both Manchester and Yorkshire. Following a takeover by Chrysalis Radio Kiss became Galaxy and he continued to present on the stations, though he moved back to London shortly afterwards to take up the role of Head of Music for MTV UK. He later joined national station long wave radio station Atlantic 252 to present "BPM" - a dance music show. Then, in October 1998, he was given the job of repositioning the station to attract 15- to 24-year-olds as programme controller. This gave him the freedom to allow rising DJs DJ Lottie, DJ Touche, Eddy Temple Morris & James Hyman their first radio shows.

Following the closure of Atlantic by the new owners, he joined Ministry of Sound as Managing Director of their digital radio station and radio syndication business in London.

Following that, he worked at TrusttheDj.com and then joined Wise Buddah as a consultant for development in July 2000 and between 2003 and 2010 worked for Hed Kandi. His role involved producing and presenting the Hed Kandi radio shows on the Galaxy Network until January 2010 and DJing internationally as one of their most popular resident DJs. The radio show since syndicated to over 34 stations internationally.

David also presented a Sunday morning chill out show on Galaxy called "Nu Cool". which ran from 2005 to January 2011.

He produced and presented a new Ibiza flavoured radio show during Summer 2010 for the UK Club Brand, Pukka Up Ibiza and currently also produces and presents a syndicated radio show with DJ Andy Daniels, called "The Triple Dee Radio Show". This is now on over 45 stations around the world. He also presented and produced a podcast for the events website, Skiddle.com. He has remixed and produced music with Andy Daniels as Triple Dee for artists such as Simply Red, Cevin Fisher, Solu Music and Timmy Vegas.

During 2011-12 on Friday evenings at 8pm on Gaydio 88.4 FM in Manchester, he presented "The Anthems Show" and also presented shows on BBC Radio Manchester during Summer 2011. His Club work continues, with monthly residencies in Manchester at Funkademia and Boxed: Music plus guest spots around the city.

In April 2012, he joined UTV Radio as Group Head of Music, then went to work at Bauer as Music Manager for the BC2 Network and Gem 106 in 2017.
