= Colin Faver =

Background information
- Born: 24 December 1951; London, United Kingdom
- Died: 5 September 2015 (aged 63)
- Genres: Acid house, house, techno, breakbeat hardcore
- Occupations: DJ, label owner, producer

Colin Faver (24 December 1951 – 5 September 2015) was a British club and radio DJ, best known for his 1990s cutting-edge show on London's Kiss FM, and an important role in the development of British club culture.

== Biography ==
Colin Faver was born in East London, and originally started out working in the Small Wonder record shop in Walthamstow. He became a big fan of punk rock, post-punk and new wave. His first 'DJ break' was when he asked to stand in for the regular DJ at London's Marquee Club.

In the late 1970s/early 1980s, he was part of Final Solution with Kevin Millins, a concert promotion company which presented bands including Throbbing Gristle, New Order, Joy Division, Echo & the Bunnymen, Thompson Twins, A Flock of Seagulls, Bauhaus and Culture Club.

== Nightclub Residences ==
Between 1982 and 1988, Faver was resident at Camden Palace (with Evil Eddie Richards), where he played a heady mix of soul, disco, hip hop, Hi-NRG, electro and early house music and at the Hedonism parties in early 1988. At that time he was one of the founder members of then pirate radio station Kiss FM, where he brought the same selection of music onto the radio. Faver held down residencies at clubs such as Pyramid and Rage at Heaven, The Wag, as well as regular guest slots at clubs such as Shoom (run by fellow Kiss DJ Danny Rampling), Nude at The Haçienda in Manchester, and increasingly travelling around the UK to play at raves especially during the acid house and Second Summer of Love period of 1988/1989.

== Kiss 94 & 100 FM ==
Faver was one of the original founding presenters of Kiss FM, once a pirate station from 1985 which became legal in 1990. His show was focused on techno, house and breakbeat hardcore. Both his and fellow DJ Colin Dale's groundbreaking early 1990s shows on the station are regularly credited as being an important education and influence.

His Demo DAT section on the show became increasingly important to showcase new and unsigned British material, and it was through this that both Digeridoo by Aphex Twin, and the debut EP by Force Mass Motion would first get played. Both would also be released on the Rabbit City Records label that he and DJ/producer Gordon Matthewman (aka DJ Edge) started in 1991. The first release on the label was their own production Cutter Mix / Beyond Control.

Between 1992 and 1993, Faver ran the midweek London techno clubnight Knowledge at the SW1 Club with Jane Howard, partner Brenda Russell, and Colin Dale.

== After Kiss 100 ==
Faver departed Kiss in June 1997. From 2006 to 2012, he hosted regular shows playing house and soul on Solar Radio. His most recent radio broadcasting was on the London station Mi-Soul in 2014.

== Death ==
Faver died of multiple organ failure on 5 September 2015.

== Discography ==
- Cutter Mix / Beyond Control (as Razorboy & Mirrorman with Gordon Edge) (Rabbit City, 1991)
- Techmix: On the Decks with Colin Faver (DJ Mix) (Kickin Records, 1998)
- Rewind: The Classics Volume 2 (DJ Mix) (UCMG, 2000)
