= Fresh 40 =

UK radio show

Fresh 40 was a networked dance and urban music singles chart show broadcast on a number of UK commercial radio stations every Sunday from 4pm to 7pm. The show was produced by Somethin' Else. The radio show was launched on Sunday 22 October 2006, and counted down the top 40 R'n'B and dance songs in the chart. Schedule-wise, the programme competed against BBC Radio 1's official chart show. It was also broadcast at the same time as its sister show, hit40uk (which was rebranded The Big Top 40 Show on 15 June 2009).

The last show is thought to have been Sunday, 1 March 2009 with Justin Wilkes.

The show, hosted by Dynamite MC, was broadcast on some of commercial radio's dance and urban stations such as the Kiss Network, Galaxy Network, Oxford's FM 107.9, Fire 107.6 and 107.6 Juice FM. Amongst the features in the show is what was branded as The Top 10 Throwdown, consisting of the Top 10 played out 'in-the-mix' and commercial-free. The Top 10 Throwdown was mixed by DJ Fidget Kid. Fresh 40 was sponsored by UK national drugs advice group FRANK.
