= Bam Bam (radio presenter) =

British radio personality

- Born: Peter Jarrod Poulton; 2 January 1970 (age 56); Chester, England
- Other names: Bam Bam; Peter Jarrod
- Occupation: Radio personality
- Known for: Bam Bam Breakfast on Kiss 100; The Bam Bam Show (Podcast); Evenings on Capital Radio; Bam Bam at Breakfast on SAMfm

Peter Jarrod Poulton (born 2 January 1970), known professionally as Bam Bam and briefly as Peter Jarrod, is a British radio personality.

== Career ==
Poulton began his radio career at the age of 16 when he joined Radio City in Liverpool, where he worked as a technician. His first full-time presenter's role was with Marcher Sound in Wrexham, North Wales. In 1993 he joined the now defunct Sunset Radio in Manchester as a presenter and commercial producer. By 1994 he had moved to Atlantic 252 where he presented the mid-morning show. In 1995 he moved to Invicta FM in Kent and presented the evening show. He later went to Kiss 105 in Yorkshire where he launched the station as breakfast show presenter. He stayed with Kiss 105 for its entire existence, moving across the Pennines to its newly branded sister station Galaxy 102 after the sale of both stations to the Chrysalis group in 1997.

In March 1998 Poulton moved to Virgin Radio where he stayed until September of the same year.

In January 1999 he went on to present the Bam Bam Breakfast on London's Kiss 100 with co-host Rob Hayes, also known as Streetboy. He hosted the show for seven years, and was the first to achieve market leadership over the dominant Chris Tarrant at Capital Breakfast, in the 15–24 demographic. The show won multiple Sony Radio Academy Awards, along with New York Festival and CRCA industry awards.

Poulton was fired in April 2006 whilst on annual leave, shortly before the station received a fine of £175,000 from the industry regulator, Ofcom, after a series of breaches of the broadcasting code during his show. Poulton was replaced by Robin Banks, who was also subsequently fired.

In March 2007, Poulton joined London's Capital 95.8 and presented the station's evening show Monday to Friday with co-hosts Rob Hayes and Kat Shoob. On 6 December 2007, Radio Today reported that Poulton had left Capital. In its nine-month run, his show increased the number of listeners to Capital Radio, during its broadcast hours, by 55%.

Poulton also did a network show on GCap Media's One Network, called "Saturday Night Bam Bam".

Between September 2006 and November 2007, Poulton and Rob Hayes worked together on a podcast from THESHOW.com. Originally called the "Bam Bam Daily" and later the "Bam Bam Show", the programme could be downloaded daily as an MP3 file. It included content which would have been unbroadcastable on normal radio such as "The Bam Bam Answer phone", "Kat Shoob World News",. and various pranks played by Hayes, including a number of meetings with Hari Krishnas. The show included regular input from James Max (The Apprentice and LBC) and Council Dweller Dave.

== 2008–2011 ==
On 14 March 2008, he was broadcasting live on BBC London 94.9 renamed "Bam" and with a different show format, standing in for Danny Baker. That August, as Peter Jarrod, he returned to Virgin Radio to cover for Iain Lee and Geoff Lloyd. The show used the same music format as Poulton's former Capital show. The following January, Poulton presented his first breakfast show in over two years as cover for Christian O'Connell on Absolute Radio. On 26 March 2011 he did a one-off evening show on BRMB in Birmingham and across the Orion Media network.

== 2011 onwards ==
On 4 July 2011 Bam Bam joined a new station on the South coast of England, JACK fm (later SAM FM). He presented Bam Bam at Breakfast on weekdays from 5 am to 10 am with his co hosts Hayley and Justin (aka Welshy). In RAJAR figures announced in early 2012, it was confirmed that he had raised listening figures on Jack FM by 52%.

As of 4 September 2017, Bam Bam no longer hosts the Sam FM radio show.

Between March 2019 and December 2024 Bam hosted a weekday daytime show on Virgin Radio UK. In January 2025 he moved to Kisstory and started a new show along with Streetboy.

== Personal life ==
Born in Chester, Poulton has lived in the London Borough of Barnet with his girlfriend and their two children since 2003.
