= London Greek Radio =

Ethnic radio station in London

Coordinates: 51.6022°N 0.1743°W

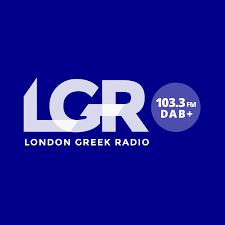
- London; England
- Broadcast area: Greater London, Birmingham and Manchester
- Frequencies: FM: 103.3 MHz (London); DAB+: 9A (London); 9A (Birmingham); 10B (Manchester)
- RDS: LGR

Programming
- Format: Greek and English

History
- First air date: 8 October 1983 (as a pirate station); 13 November 1989 (as a legal station)

Links
- Website: www.lgr.co.uk

London Greek Radio (LGR) is an Independent Local Radio station for London's Greek community, most of which forms part of the ethnically diverse Cypriot community. It broadcasts in both Greek and English on 103.3 FM in London and is also available on DAB in London, Birmingham and Manchester.

LGR was first founded in October 1983 by Chris Harmanda and George Power (later to set up Kiss FM), and started life as a pirate radio station. On 13 November 1989, it commenced legal broadcasting as part of the Independent Broadcasting Authority incremental radio licenses. It initially shared its frequency with another former pirate station, WNK. They become the first stations to share a frequency and they alternated every four hours. This continued until 1993 when WNK went into liquidation and closed down.

It is currently based in the North London suburb of Finchley. The station has a focus on Greek and Cypriot music, with some music sung in Armenian and Turkish. It includes news from the Cyprus Broadcasting Corporation (CyBC). It serves advertising for many Greek and Cypriot run businesses in and around North London. LGR has recently increased its English language air-time due to a lack of Greek-speaking young Londoners listening, particularly in the evenings as part of the New Generation show.

According to market research from 2007, its audience today consists mainly of Greek Cypriots and other Greeks, as well as Turkish, Armenian and Maronite Cypriots. Listeners also include other people of Middle Eastern and Mediterranean ancestry, especially Arabs and Jews, and Italians.

== See also ==
- British Cypriots
- Greeks in the United Kingdom
