= Eddie Richards =

British DJ

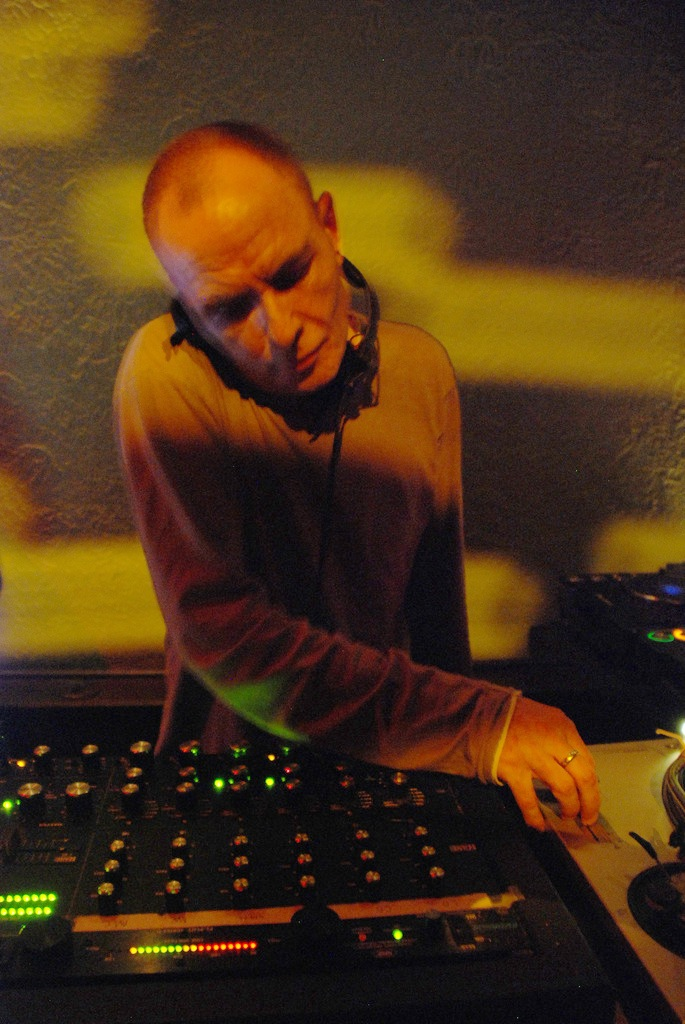
- Eddie Richards performing in 2007

Background information
- Also known as: Evil Eddie Richards, Jolly Roger
- Born: Amersham, Buckinghamshire, United Kingdom
- Genres: Dance music
- Occupations: DJ, Producer
- Years active: 1980s–present
- Website: http://www.eddierichards.net

Eddie Richards, also known as Evil Eddie Richards and Jolly Roger, is a British DJ. He was one of the first DJs to champion house music back in the mid-1980s and one of the United Kingdom's original mix DJs at London's Camden Palace. Richards is considered the "Godfather" of a subgenre of house, known as Tech house.

== Biography ==
Richards was born in Amersham, Buckinghamshire, England. He came to prominence in the 1980s as a DJ at the Camden Palace in London; he credits Colin Faver for getting him a residency at the club. He became resident DJ at Clink Street (alongside Mr. C), where he played a major role in introducing house music to the UK, and he has been called Britain's "godfather of house".

From April 1989 to July 1990, Richards ran a local clubnight, "Outer Limits", at the Nightclub Rayzels in Bletchley, Milton Keynes. In June 1990, he set up the DJ agency Dy-na-mix.

Later, Richards devoted more time to music production, releasing and licensing tracks with labels in the UK, Europe & US including End Recordings, Hypervinyl, SoCo Audio, Northern Lights, LHB, & own labels Lunar Tunes, Dy-na-mix & Storm.

Besides his long-standing residency at Wiggle, a series of London underground parties, he spins regularly at Fabric in London and has been included in the Fabric mix albums.

== Tech House ==
The roots of Tech House can be traced to the United Kingdom in the early 1990s after the explosion of Acid house. Tech House was seen as the direct alternative to acid house, as it did not have the high energy to be played as much at raves that was commonly seen through other genres at the time, and therefore, the subgenre seemingly did not reach its full potential right away.

Richards began experimenting with the genre and helped it gain prominence by DJ'ing with Mr. C at the Paul Stone and Clink Street RIP parties in 1988, then seen as the counterpart to the Shoom events.

The Clink Street Parties that Richards and Mr. C threw pioneered a road for the Tech House events that followed. Richards became one of three residents at the Iconic Wiggle parties in the early 90s, along with the Drop Parties and Heart and Soul/Release events. Tech House shortly thereafter was incubated.

After playing at Clink Street and Heaven in London and The Haçienda in Manchester, Richards headlined the Second Summer of Love parties such as Sunrise, Energy and Helter Skelter. Remix and production work led to the release of club classics such as "Acid Man" in 1988, which reached number 23 in the UK singles charts, followed by other remixes of Ralphi Rosario, Orbital and The Shamen.

== Discography ==
- "Acid Man" (as Jolly Roger) (10 Records, 1989)
- "Why Can't We Live Together" (as Jolly Roger) (Desire Records, 1989)
- The Dark EP (Visitor / N.E.W.S, 2002)
- 9660 EP (Household Digital, 2003)
- Fabric 16 (DJ Mix) (Fabric London, 2004)
- Classics EP (Bla Bla Music, 2010)
- "Soul Is Life / Mbaby" (Storm Recordings, 2014)
- "Yeyo / Aaaiii" (Storm Recordings, 2014)
- "Dream2 / Imove" (Storm Recordings, 2015)
- Lost in Time (as a Remix on Lost in Time) (Asia Music, 2017)
- Nocturnal EP (Sweatbox Records, 2019)
