= Kiss 101 =

Former radio station in Bristol, England

Coordinates: 51.4531°N 2.5955°W

- Bristol; England
- Broadcast area: South Wales and West of England
- Frequencies: 101 MHz

Programming
- Format: Electronic dance music R&B; Hip hop

Ownership
- Owner: Kiss Network, Bauer Radio

History
- First air date: 6 September 2006
- Last air date: 31 December 2010

Technical information
- Repeater: 97.2 MHz (Central Bristol)

Kiss 101 was a radio station in Bristol, England that broadcast to South Wales and the West of England, playing pop, dance, hip hop, urban, R&B and electronic music.

== History ==
The station started broadcasting as a pirate radio station called For the People or FTP, which later secured a licence to broadcast to the city of Bristol in 1990 on 97.2 MHz FM. After only a year on air, it was acquired by the Chiltern Radio Group and was renamed Galaxy 97.2. The station manager was Keith Francis (Gooden), who also presented the 1000–1400 weekday programme. Galaxy 97.2 "The Hot FM" quickly gained popularity and achieved a 50% reach in the 15–24 target demographic. It became the UK's best-performing dance music station in terms of reach, hours and share.

On 4 September 1994, the group won the UK's first regional licence and Bristol's Galaxy 97.2 became Galaxy 101, broadcasting to an area stretching from Swansea in Wales through Bristol and south into Somerset on 101.0 MHz FM. Since reception of the new service was poor in central Bristol, the station was permitted by the Radio Authority to retain its 97.2 transmitter, which beforehand was separately licensed.

In October 1995, the station became part of Chrysalis plc, who invested £1 million in Galaxy 101.

Galaxy 101 was sold to GWR Group and Scottish Radio Holdings in 2002 and rebranded Vibe 101, but this purchase was subsequently vetoed by the Competition Commission over concerns regarding control of the Bristol radio advertising market. The Commission ordered GWR to sell their stake, which was bought by Scottish Radio Holdings later that year. In July 2005, Scottish Radio Holdings was in turn taken over by the Emap group, owners of the Kiss brand that Galaxy 102 and Galaxy 105 were formerly licensed to use.

Vibe 101 (latterly broadcasting as Vibe FM) was relaunched as Kiss 101 on 6 September 2006 as Emap integrated the stations of the former SRH into its own portfolio. Kiss 101 launched simultaneously with the re-branding of sister station Vibe 105–108 to Kiss 105-108, and a relaunch of Kiss 100. All three new Kiss stations started to carry a new blue Kiss logo, and the core music genre was changed to focus more on Dance. Kiss 105-108 and Kiss 101 retained many shows presented by the DJs who previously presented under the Vibe brand, but also offered shows that were networked across all three stations at the same time.

Emap gained clearance from the UK communications regulator Ofcom to network programming between Kiss 101, Kiss 105-108 and Kiss 100. The company also pledged to significantly increase the amount of specialist programming on the former Vibe stations, with the minimum weekly amount of specialist output stated on the (former) Vibe licences more than doubling from 16 to 36 hours.

Emap sold its radio and consumer magazine businesses, including the Kiss stations, to Bauer Verlagsgruppe on 29 January 2008, as part of the complete breakup and sale of the company to various suitors. Consequently, Emap Radio now operates as Bauer Radio. Thus Bauer became the fifth company to have owned "101" in six years.

In December 2010, all the local programming of Kiss 101 (which already restricted to weekday breakfast & drive) was dropped to make the main station Kiss 100 a national service.

== Notable presenters ==
Presenters broadcasting on Kiss 101 include Will Cozens.

== Transmitters ==
The station broadcast on 101.0 MHz FM from the Mendip transmitter in Somerset at a power of 40 kW, using the most powerful commercial FM transmitter in the UK. This transmitter is, however, highly directional with the maximum permitted effective radiated power (ERP) being directed towards the northwest to ensure delivery of a strong signal into South East Wales, particularly Cardiff, Newport and Bridgend. This also appears to be in order to penetrate the Welsh Valleys which lie immediately to the north of Cardiff, and to deliver signal towards settlements at the heads of the valleys such as Merthyr Tydfil.

In all other directions, Ofcom's published technical parameters indicate that the radiated power is as little as 400 watts, particularly to the east in order to minimise interference to Classic FM's Wrotham, Kent FM transmitter on the adjacent frequency of 100.9 MHz which serves much of South East England.

Kiss 101 also used a filler transmitter for much of Bristol and the immediately surrounding area on 97.2 MHz FM at a power of 200 W, mixed polarisation, located on the concrete communications tower at Purdown, immediately to the west of the M32 motorway, towards the north of the city. The same site is also used by The Breeze for their only transmitter. The transmitter broadcasts on the frequency originally used by the station before it won the regional Severn Estuary licence in 1994 and thus clearance to also transmit on 101.0 from Mendip. Prior to this award, the station served Bristol only, with a coverage area no larger than that of The Breeze.

Kiss 101 was formerly also carried on DAB on the MXR Severn Estuary multiplex until its closure in 2013. Kiss 100 can still be heard, nationally, on DAB as it is carried on the Digital One multiplex.

== See also ==
- Kiss Network
- Kiss 100 London
- Kiss 105-108
- Kiss TV
