= Incremental Radio (IBA) =

British radio licence category

Incremental Radio was a new type of radio licence given out by the IBA (Independent Broadcasting Authority) in the United Kingdom between 1989 and 1990. In essence, these were additional radio services introduced into areas already served by an ILR (Independent Local Radio) station.

The new stations had to offer output not already available on ILR, such as specialist music or unique programmes for a specific section of the community, which meant radio stations covering a niche interest (e.g. Jazz music) could legally get on AM/FM. Pirates could apply as long as they closed by the end of 1988 and long established pirate stations, such as Kiss FM, complied in the hope of winning a licence.

== History ==
An initial announcement of the scheme was made in September 1988, and was followed the next month by an invitation for interested parties to contact the IBA. Just before Christmas 1988, the IBA published details of the geographical locations of the licences. On 10 January 1989, the IBA advertised the first five of the twenty licences it planned to offer, in Manchester, Hounslow (West London) who wanted to serve local ethnic groups, and from bidders in Bristol, Rutland and Stirling who could propose any format. The closing batch for this first round of applications was 13 March 1989, the winners to be announced in April.

The IBA had advertised a second batch of five licences on 6 February 1989, consisting of ethnic services in Coventry and Haringey, and any format for the Isle of Wight, Sunderland and Tendring. Applications for these had to be submitted by 10 April 1989, with the winners announced in May.

On 6 March 1989, the IBA held a press conference at its Knightsbridge office to announce the third batch of licences it was advertising – an ethnic service for the whole of London, an ethnic station for Bradford, and services for any format in Belfast, Kettering and Stockport. The closing date for these was 8 May 1989 (except for London which was 5 June) and the winners to be announced one month later.

In October 1989, Sunset Radio in Manchester became the first Incremental radio station to go on air. The last Incremental radio station to launch was Wear FM, which started broadcasting in November 1990.

It set a new blueprint for how future licences would be issued in the nineties. Written applications were followed up with additional questioning by IBA staff rather than face to face board presentations made to Authority members, as was the case with ILR.

== List of incremental licences (in order of on-air date) ==
- Sunset Radio – Manchester – 22 October 1989
- Sunrise Radio (1413 AM) – West London – 5 November 1989
- London Greek Radio/WNK (Wicked, Neutral and Kicking) – North London – 13 November 1989

London Greek Radio and WNK shared the 103.3 FM frequency, and alternated every four hours. Each had their own premises, but the timesharing agreement proved inconvenient for WNK, as listeners preferred the full-time pirates. WNK went into liquidation in 1993, meaning LGR no longer had to timeshare. Furthermore, in July 1992, it was revealed that the licence shared by London Greek Radio and WNK in North London was to only go to one station when it was re-advertised in 1993.

- Sunrise Radio – Bradford – 9 December 1989
- KFM – Stockport – 17 February 1990
- Jazz FM – London – 4 March 1990
- Radio Thamesmead – 18 March 1990
- Choice FM – South London – 31 March 1990
- KCBC – Kettering – 6 April 1990
- Belfast Community Radio – 6 April 1990
- Isle of Wight Radio – 15 April 1990
- FTP (For the People) – Bristol – 21 April 1990
- Buzz FM – Birmingham – 14 May 1990
- Centre Sound – Stirling – 4 June 1990
- Airport Information Radio – Heathrow & Gatwick airports – 25 June 1990
- East End Radio – Glasgow – 25 June 1990

East End Radio subsequently had its licence revoked on 30 August 1991, when it transferred ownership of its license to a third party without the Radio Authority's approval.

- Spectrum Radio – London – 25 June 1990

The London licence, for the AM medium wave band, was specifically designated for use by a number of different ethnic minority broadcasters who would share a single channel. The IBA would act as a broker for these groups, bringing them together to form a management team that would run the station co-operatively.

- Melody Radio – London – 9 July 1990
- Radio Harmony – Coventry – 28 August 1990
- Kiss 100 – London – 1 September 1990
- Mellow 1557 – Tendring – 7 October 1990
- Wear FM – Sunderland – 5 November 1990

=== Incremental radio licences that didn't make it to air ===
RWL (Radio West Lothian) - was awarded an incremental licence and was due to go on air in 1990 on 1368 MW, but didn't make it to air. It failed to find sufficient financial backing and handed back the licence.
