= List of British films of 1997 =

A list of British films released in 1997.

== 1997 ==
Title	Director	Cast	Genre	Notes
1997
Bean	Mel Smith	Rowan Atkinson, Peter MacNicol, Pamela Reed	Comedy	
Bent	Sean Mathias	Lothaire Bluteau, Clive Owen	Drama	Co-production with Japan
The Borrowers	Peter Hewitt	John Goodman, Jim Broadbent, Celia Imrie	Fantasy	
Bring Me the Head of Mavis Davis	John Henderson	Rik Mayall, Jane Horrocks	Comedy	Entered into the 20th Moscow International Film Festival
Career Girls	Mike Leigh	Katrin Cartlidge, Lynda Steadman	Drama	
Darklands	Julian Richards	Craig Fairbrass, Jon Finch	Horror	
The Designated Mourner	David Hare	Mike Nichols, Miranda Richardson	Drama	
Driftwood	Ronan O'Leary	James Spader, Anne Brochet	Thriller	Co-production with the Republic of Ireland
Event Horizon	Paul W. S. Anderson	Laurence Fishburne, Sam Neill	Sci-fi/horror	
Face	Antonia Bird	Robert Carlyle, Ray Winstone	Crime drama	
FairyTale: A True Story	Charles Sturridge	Florence Hoath, Elizabeth Earl, Phoebe Nicholls	Historical fantasy	Based on the legend of the Cottingley Fairies
Fever Pitch	David Evans	Colin Firth, Ruth Gemmell	Sports/comedy	
Fierce Creatures	Fred Schepisi	John Cleese, Jamie Lee Curtis, Kevin Kline	Comedy	
The Fifth Element	Luc Besson	Bruce Willis, Milla Jovovich, Gary Oldman, Chris Tucker, Ian Holm	Science fiction action	
Food of Love	Stephen Poliakoff	Richard E. Grant, Nathalie Baye	Comedy	
Firelight	William Nicholson	Sophie Marceau, Stephen Dillane, Kevin Anderson, Lia Williams, Dominique Belcourt, Joss Ackland	Period romance	Co-production with the US
The Full Monty	Peter Cattaneo	Robert Carlyle, Mark Addy	Comedy	
A Further Gesture	Robert Dornhelm	Stephen Rea, Alfred Molina	Thriller	
G.I. Jane	Ridley Scott	Demi Moore, Viggo Mortensen, Anne Bancroft	Action drama	Co-production with the US
The Gambler	Károly Makk	Michael Gambon, Jodhi May	Biopic	
The Girl with Brains in Her Feet	Roberto Bangura	Amanda Mealing, Joanna Ward	Sport	
The Hanging Garden	Thom Fitzgerald	Chris Leavins, Kerry Fox	Drama	Co-production with Canada
The House of Angelo	Jim Goddard	Edward Woodward, Peter Woodward	Historical	
Lawn Dogs	John Duigan	Mischa Barton, Sam Rockwell	Drama	Final Rank film
Loop	Allan Niblo	Andy Serkis, Susannah York, Tony Selby	Romance/comedy	
Love and Death on Long Island	Richard Kwietniowski	John Hurt, Jason Priestley	Drama	Screened at the 1997 Cannes Film Festival
The Matchmaker	Mark Joffe	Janeane Garofalo, David O'Hara	Romance/comedy	
Metroland	Philip Saville	Christian Bale, Emily Watson	Comedy	
Mrs Brown	John Madden	Judi Dench, Billy Connolly	Biopic	Screened at the 1997 Cannes Film Festival
Mrs Dalloway	Marleen Gorris	Vanessa Redgrave, Natascha McElhone	Drama	
My Son the Fanatic	Udayan Prasad	Om Puri, Rachel Griffiths, Akbar Kurtha	Drama	
Nil by Mouth	Gary Oldman	Ray Winstone, Kathy Burke	Drama	Entered into the 1997 Cannes Film Festival
Photographing Fairies	Nick Willing	Toby Stephens, Rachel Shelley, Edward Hardwicke	Fantasy	
Preaching to the Perverted	Stuart Urban	Guinevere Turner, Tom Bell, Christien Anholt	Comedy	
Regeneration	Gillies MacKinnon	Jonathan Pryce, Jonny Lee Miller	World War I	
The Serpent's Kiss	Philippe Rousselot	Ewan McGregor, Greta Scacchi	Drama	
Shooting Fish	Stefan Schwartz	Dan Futterman, Stuart Townsend, Kate Beckinsale	Comedy	
Sixth Happiness	Waris Hussein	Firdaus Kanga, Souad Faress	Drama	
So This Is Romance?	Kevin W. Smith	Reece Dinsdale, Victoria Smurfit	Comedy/romance	
Spice World	Bob Spiers	Spice Girls, Richard E. Grant, Roger Moore	Comedy	
The Tango Lesson	Sally Potter	Sally Potter, Pablo Verón	Drama/dance	
Tomorrow Never Dies	Roger Spottiswoode	Pierce Brosnan, Jonathan Pryce, Michelle Yeoh	Spy/action	
Twin Town	Kevin Allen	Llŷr Ifans, Rhys Ifans, Dorien Thomas	Black comedy	Entered into the 47th Berlin International Film Festival
Welcome to Sarajevo	Michael Winterbottom	Stephen Dillane, Woody Harrelson, Goran Višnjić	Drama	Entered into the 1997 Cannes Film Festival
Wilde	Brian Gilbert	Stephen Fry, Jude Law	Biopic	Co-production with Germany & Japan
The Wings of the Dove	Iain Softley	Helena Bonham Carter, Alison Elliott, Linus Roache	Literary drama	
The Woodlanders	Phil Agland	Emily Woof, Rufus Sewell	Drama	

== See also ==
- 1997 in film
- 1997 in British music
- 1997 in British radio
- 1997 in British television
- 1997 in the United Kingdom
- List of 1997 box office number-one films in the United Kingdom
