= Mick Cartwright =

English footballer (born 1946)

Personal information
- Full name: Michael Cartwright
- Date of birth: 9 October 1946 (age 80)
- Place of birth: Birmingham, England
- Position: Full back

Youth career
- Coventry City

Senior career*
| Years | Team | Apps | (Gls) |
| 1967–1969 | Notts County | 16 | (0) |
| 1967–1968 | → Bradford City (loan) | 1 | (0) |
- Dover
| Total | | 17 | (0) |
- * Club domestic league appearances and goals

Michael Cartwright (born 9 October 1946) is an English former professional footballer who played as a full back.

== Career ==
Born in Birmingham, Cartwright played for Coventry City, Notts County, Bradford City and Dover.

He played for Bradford City between November 1967 and January 1968, making 1 appearance in the Football League.

== Sources ==
- Frost, Terry (1988). Bradford City A Complete Record 1903–1988. Breedon Books Sport. ISBN 0-907969-38-0.
