= Sacha Brooks =

British radio personality

Sacha Brooks is a British radio presenter and DJ from Nottingham.

== Biography ==
Sacha's radio career started on the pirate radio station Globe 107.7fm in Nottingham and she went on to launch Choice 102.2 in Birmingham. She relocated to Japan where she spent three years as a DJ before returning to the United Kingdom to join Vibe 105 – 108. She was then poached by Galaxy Birmingham to host "The Flava Zone" before being promoted to the Galaxy network based in Leeds, where she originally did the afternoon show before being moved up to the mid-morning one.

Galaxy was rebranded as Capital on 3 January 2011. She is now the weekday drivetime and until 17 September 2011 the Saturday mid-morning presenter on Capital Birmingham (previously Galaxy Birmingham). She also presented a networked Dubstep/Funky/R&B show each Sunday 2-5 am on Capital network from 1 May 2011 until 15 July 2012, however this show continues to air locally on Capital Birmingham every Friday 2-4 am. She also hosted a Saturday mid-morning program from 9 am-1 pm on Capital Xtra, but shortly afterwards, it was taken over by Vick Hope.

On 30 August 2019, Global Radio launched a new station ‘Capital XTRA Reloaded’ (launched Monday 2 September) whereby Sacha was selected to be the first presenter on the station. As a result of which she ceased working for Capital in Birmingham on the drive time show, which Global replaced with ‘Tom & Claire’ (originally from Capital East Midlands). Now Sacha presents the breakfast show on Capital XTRA Reloaded from 8am-12pm Monday-Friday.

Sacha Brooks presented her final show on Capital Xtra Reloaded on 26 May 2023 after deciding to hang up her headphones.
