= Scottish Radio Holdings =

Scottish media company owning radio stations

Scottish Radio Holdings plc
- Company type: Public limited company
- Industry: Media
- Founded: 3 February 1971; 55 years ago (as Radio Clyde); 9 February 1994; 32 years ago (as Scottish Radio Holdings)
- Defunct: 21 June 2005; 20 years ago
- Fate: Bought by EMAP Radio, newspaper division bought by Johnston Press
- Headquarters: Glasgow, Scotland
- Parent: Bauer Media Audio UK

Scottish Radio Holdings plc (SRH), previously Radio Clyde Holdings plc, was a Scottish media company which owned 22 radio stations, and around 30 local newspapers in the United Kingdom and the Republic of Ireland.

== History ==
SRH had its origins in the 1970s when Glasgow was awarded the third licence for a commercial station in the UK. As a result, in 1973 Radio Clyde began broadcasting. Unlike the two existing commercial stations (both in London), Radio Clyde was an immediate success. This was helped in part by strong financial backers that included Sean Connery and Jackie Stewart.

In 1991 laws controlling the ownership of commercial stations were relaxed. Clyde then merged with Radio Forth and immediately floated on the London Stock Exchange.

The company changed its name from Radio Clyde Holdings to Scottish Radio Holdings on 9 February 1994.

In October 1995 SRH acquired Morton Newspapers – which owned around 20 newspapers in Northern Ireland – for £11.2 million. Morton's operations became part of SRH's Score Press subsidiary, which had been founded earlier that year. Since then SRH expanded operations by acquiring further publications in Scotland and the Republic of Ireland.

In 1998, SRH established another subsidiary called Score Digital to operate DAB multiplexes. On 3 September 1999, it was granted the licence to broadcast in Glasgow. The multiplex aired on 31 May 2000 and was officially opened by Sharleen Spiteri on 7 June 2000. Score Digital was the sole applicant for the licence to broadcast a DAB ensemble in Edinburgh, which it received on 10 March 2000, before the multiplex started broadcasting on 31 October 2000. It also submitted the only bid for the Northern Ireland licence on 25 July 2000, which was awarded in October 2000, and the ensemble started broadcasting on 24 September 2001. It was successful in its application to operate a multiplex in Dundee and Perth, with the licence awarded on 6 September 2001 over a competing bid by Switchdigital. Score Digital was granted a licence to broadcast in Inverness in December 2001 and the multiplex aired on 22 August 2003. It also operated a multiplex in Ayr.

=== Purchase by Emap ===
SRH had a network of 22 stations when it was acquired by rival media group Emap on 21 June 2005. The newspaper titles published by SRH, collectively known as Score Press, was sold to Johnston Press for £155 million. The group's newspaper interests were sold off as were the firm's radio operations in the Republic of Ireland. SRH's UK radio operations were integrated into those of Emap with the two SRH-owned Vibe FM stations becoming Kiss 101 and Kiss 105-108. The group's FM stations in Scotland formed a local version of the Big City Network which Emap were already operating in England. Emap also took on SRH's AM stations in Scotland, Wave 105 on England's south coast, and two stations in Northern Ireland from SRH.

In December 2007, Emap announced that their consumer media interests including radio stations would be sold to Hamburg based Bauer Media Group.
