= Kiss 105 =

Defunct radio station

- England
- Broadcast area: Yorkshire, England
- Frequencies: 105.1 MHz; 105.6 MHz (Sheffield & Bradford); 105.8 MHz (East Riding of Yorkshire)

Programming
- Language: English
- Format: Dance

Ownership
- Owner: Faze FM
- Sister stations: Kiss 102 (Manchester)

History
- First air date: 14 February 1997

Technical information
- Transmitter coordinates: 53.79981°N 1.55645°W

Kiss 105 was a dance music radio station based in Leeds, West Yorkshire. It was part of a new breed of regional radio stations as opposed to Independent Local Radio.

== History ==
The licence, covering the Yorkshire and Humberside region, was one of the biggest in the UK outside London, and it was won by Faze FM, who already operated Kiss 102 in Manchester. EMAP who owned London's Kiss 100 gave Faze permission to license the name.

The station was launched by Bam Bam at 1.05 pm on 14 February 1997 and the first track played was 'I Like It (Lisa Marie Vocal Experience)' by Angel Moraes. Most programming came from Leeds but some specialist shows, especially at the weekend, were simulcast on both Kiss stations.

Later in 1997, both stations were sold to Chrysalis Radio who rebranded the stations as Galaxy 105 as the brand licence required them to relinquish the name.

== Technical ==
A total of four transmitters were used to cover the whole of Yorkshire. The East Riding of Yorkshire is served by 105.8, Sheffield by 105.6, Bradford by 105.6 and a general Yorkshire transmitter on 105.1 FM. The studios were based at Joseph's Well, Hanover Walk, Park Lane in Leeds, West Yorkshire and are still used for Capital Yorkshire. Some of the programmes were shared with the Manchester station.

== DJs/presenters ==
- BamBam
- Tony Fisher
- Rob Tissera
- Jo-Jo (Now at Capital Yorkshire – part of Capital Yorkshire Drivetime alongside Adam O’Neill, weekdays 4–7pm )
- Alex Pepper
- Graeme Park
- Jez Willis
- David Dunne
- Andi Durrant
- Anthony Collins
- James Blessing
- Sara Fellows (News)
- Lisa Moskaluk (News)
- John-Paul Glover (aka JP)
- Jay Smith
- Nemone Metaxas
- Ambient Alliance aka Ste p & DjayH (Drum And Bass Show)
