= Faze FM =

Faze FM Radio Ltd.
- Trade name: Fase FM
- Company type: Limited company
- Industry: Media
- Genre: Radio
- Founded: Manchester, England (1993)
- Defunct: 1997
- Fate: Acquired 1997
- Successor: Chrysalis Group
- Headquarters: Manchester, England
- Area served: North of England
- Key people: Guy Hornsby; Mike Gray; Julian Martin; Eugene Perera
- Products: Kiss 102; Kiss 105

Faze FM Radio Ltd was the owner of two dance music radio stations in the North of England.

It operated Kiss 102 in Manchester and Kiss 105 in Yorkshire from 1994 to 1997 before being taken over by Chrysalis Group.

== History ==
Faze FM Radio Ltd was incorporated in 1993 by Eugene Perera's Level Broadcast Ltd. A licence application for the Manchester ILR with shareholders Level Broadcast, Mike Powell's UKRD, Eastern Counties Newspaper Group and 3i was successful and Faze FM Radio Ltd launched as Kiss 102 in November 1994. At launch, Guy Hornsby was managing director, Mike Gray, programme controller, Julian Martin, sales controller and Eugene Perera, marketing director. A further successful licence application for the Yorkshire regional licence resulted in the launch of Kiss 105 in 1997. Initially the group employed just 17 staff, but this grew to over 120 individuals working full and part-time in programming, sales, marketing, administration, finance and engineering.

The Kiss 102/105 dance music format was the brainchild of two highly experienced UK radio programmers, Mike Gray and Guy Hornsby, who first worked together at the original BBC Radio London where they produced the station's leading DJ presenters Robbie Vincent and Tony Blackburn.

Despite staying true to its roots and playing "thumping dance music" at breakfast time, a move perceived of in the radio industry at the time as unlikely to be popular, the station achieved a 10% share of the total available audience, and its yellow oblong car stickers could be seen proudly displayed by an enthusiastic audience across the entire region.

Following approaches by most of the country's key media players, Faze FM was purchased by the Chrysalis Group (now Global Radio) for £17.6m just over four years after the company had been founded with an initial investment of £600k. The stations were renamed as Galaxy after the purchase, and in 2011 Global Radio re-branded them both Capital Manchester and Capital Yorkshire as part of the new Capital network.

== Branding ==
Faze licensed the "Kiss" brand from Kiss 100 in London and commissioned radio ident company Alfasound to make their jingles. Two custom packages were made, the first was called "Danceman" and the follow-up was called "Music is Life".

== Notes ==
- UKRD helped getting the licences
- Built the studios
