= Kiss 102 =

Dance music radio station in Manchester, England

England
- Broadcast area: Manchester
- Frequency: 102 MHz

Programming
- Format: Dance

Ownership
- Owner: Faze FM

History
- First air date: 16 October 1994

Kiss 102 was a dance music radio station based in Manchester, England.

== History ==
The frequency was originally issued to Sunset 102 Radio - The Kickin FM but that suffered some financial problems. In May 1993, the Radio Authority made a decision to prematurely terminate Sunset's licence, apparently accusing the station of providing inaccurate information about its financial and management affairs. In August 1993 the station reportedly had its transmission facilities withdrawn by NTL for non-payment. Following a brief return to the air the liquidator was called in and Sunset's frequency finally fell silent. The liquidator was later to re-apply on behalf of Sunset Radio for its re-advertised licence. Faze FM won the re-advertised licence for Manchester. Like Sunset, Faze FM's remit was to broadcast dance music, licensing the brand name "Kiss" from London station Kiss 100FM and the station launched as Kiss 102 on the 16 October 1994. The licence win was spearheaded by Eugene Perera's Level Broadcast and included shareholders UKRD, Eastern Counties Newspaper Group and 3i. The format was the brainchild of two highly experienced UK radio programmers - Managing Director, Guy Hornsby and Programme Director, Mike Gray who first worked together at the original BBC Radio London where they produced the station's highest profile presenters Tony Blackburn and Robbie Vincent.

Kiss 102 station won awards for its coverage of social issues and was acknowledged by writers like Dave Haslam and commentators such as Tony Wilson as helping to prolong and grow dance music in Manchester. The station achieved a 10 per cent reach at its height (RAJAR, Q2, 1997), giving heritage station Key103 its first serious commercial competitor in the city.

Unusually for a small UK radio station aimed at the youth market, it had a dedicated news service (at one point providing a news-reading service to its sister station in London Kiss 100), a nightly entertainment magazine sponsored by The Guardian, and was noted by Independent Radio News for its coverage of the 1996 Provisional Irish Republican Army bombing of the city and also for its policy of linking sport and music for example with the Manchester United Red Cafe and the Manchester Giants shows. It was also noteworthy for its policy of social integration, led by the influence of the club scene which brought about sponsorship of such events as the Manchester Mardi Gras during its years of greatest expansion. In common with other specialist music stations it handed over many hours of output to club DJs, artists and music producers who had little or no experience of radio presentation leading to ground-breaking - if at times anarchic - entertainment from groups like Fat City Records, Autechre and 808 State.

== DJs/presenters ==
- David Dunne
- Graeme Park
- 808 State
- Marcus Intalex
- Nemone
- Dominic Byrne
- The Haçienda
- Mark Ovenden
- Autechre
