= Kiss (UK radio station) =

British radio station based in London

Coordinates: 51.51598°N 0.13844°W

- The station's logo since May 2026
- London; United Kingdom
- Frequencies: DAB+: 11D/12A Digital One (UK); DAB+: 12C London 1

Programming
- Format: CHR
- Network: Kiss Network

Ownership
- Owner: Bauer Media Audio UK
- Sister stations: Kisstory; Kiss Xtra; Kiss Dance; Absolute Radio; Greatest Hits Radio; Heat Radio; Hits Radio; Jazz FM; Kerrang! Radio; Magic; Planet Rock

History
- First air date: 7 October 1985 (as a pirate); 1 September 1990 (as a legal station)
- Former names: Kiss FM; Kiss 100
- Former frequencies: 97.2 MHz (Bristol); 100.0 MHz (London); 101.0 MHz (Severn Estuary); 105.6 MHz (Cambridge, Central Cambridgeshire, and South Cambridgeshire); 106.1 MHz (Norwich); 106.4 MHz (North Essex, Suffolk and Norfolk); 107.7 MHz (Peterborough, North West Norfolk and South Lincolnshire)

Links
- Webcast: Rayo
- Website: KISS

Kiss is a British digital radio station owned and operated by Bauer Media Audio UK as part of the Kiss Network. Kiss broadcasts nationally to the UK via DAB digital radio, as well as on Bauer's Rayo platform.

The station started in 1985 as a pirate radio station, Kiss FM, before becoming the UK's first legal black and dance music specialist radio station in 1990 as Kiss 100, broadcasting in London on 100.0 FM. Kiss became a digital-only station in 2024 when its FM frequencies in London, Norfolk and the west of England were taken over by Hits Radio.

According to RAJAR, the station broadcasts to a weekly audience of 1.288 million as of February 2026.

== Early history ==
=== Pirate roots ===
Kiss FM first broadcast 7 October 1985 as a pirate radio station, initially to South London then across the whole city, on 94FM. Kiss FM was founded by Gordon "Mac" McNamee, George Power (of London Greek Radio), and Tosca Jackson, with its engineer Pyers Easton. Transmitting seven-days from the start, it would be regularly taken off-air by the authorities and so became a weekend operation shortly afterwards.

The station developed a cult and committed following across Greater London, with figures in the press at the time stating that the station commanded some 500,000 listeners while operating as an unlicensed pirate station, and an Evening Standard readers' poll in 1987 put Kiss second, behind Capital Radio. Gordon Mac approached a successful London club promoter, Guy Wingate, to discuss ways of improving the Kiss FM profile. As a result, Wingate launched the very successful Kiss nights at the Wag Club (which included the first ever UK acid house party – an idea put forward by Colin Faver and Danny Rampling, both DJs on the station). These nights increased the station's credibility with its target audience and Wingate joined the Kiss team, followed shortly thereafter by Lindsay Wesker. Kiss would also run its own night at Dingwalls and adopted the slogan Radical Radio.

Mac and ten of the DJs on the station including Norman Jay, Jonathan More, Colin Faver, Trevor Nelson, and Tim Westwood would become "shareholders" in a company called Goodfoot Promotions, with Mac heading up the station as its majority holder. By 1988, Kiss was at its strongest with a DJ line-up which had become the cream of London's clubland, and in that December, Mac and the other shareholders would announce that they would decide to close down in order to apply for a legal licence. This was in response to the UK Government and Independent Broadcasting Authority (IBA) announcement that twenty new "incremental radio" licences would be advertised, including one for London. Stations were told that they would have to voluntarily closedown when applying, and so on New Year's Eve 1988, the final broadcast went out with an outside broadcast at Dingwalls.

Legal launch, 1st Sept 1990 from the documentary 'Radical Radio'

Kiss would submit a strong application with widespread support from listeners, clubs, record labels and music magazines, however on 12 July 1989, the IBA instead awarded the licence to Jazz FM.

=== Legal licence ===
Despite the temptation to return to the air again illegally, Kiss held off as the IBA had said they would make more licences available, which they did in September 1989. Kiss re-prepared their application, but this time got the backing and majority investment of media group EMAP. On 17 December 1989, the IBA announced that Kiss had been awarded a licence on their second attempt.

Kiss established its new studios and office on Holloway Road, and on 1 September 1990, Kiss began legal broadcasting as Kiss 100. Gordon Mac led a countdown in the studio to the official launch at 12pm; the first tune played being "Pirates Anthem" by Cocoa Tea and Shabba Ranks, followed by Norman Jay hosting the very first full show.

The Channel 4 documentary Radical Radio followed Kiss as it came off air as a pirate station, gained its licence, built its new studios, and commenced legal broadcasting.

=== Kiss 101 (Bristol) ===
Starting out as a Bristol pirate radio station, it became part of the Galaxy Radio network broadcasting to South Wales and the West of England, playing pop, dance, hip hop, urban, R&B and electronic music as Galaxy 101. It was eventually bought by EMAP and became Kiss 101 in September 2006 and part of the Kiss network.

=== Kiss 102 (Manchester) and Kiss 105 (Yorkshire) ===
The Faze FM group licensed the name and logo from Kiss 100 to launch Kiss 102 in Manchester in October 1994. In February 1997, it expanded into Yorkshire launching Kiss 105. The group was later sold to Chrysalis Radio, and by September 1997 both stations became part of the Galaxy Radio network.

=== Kiss 105–108 (East Anglia) ===
The East Anglian and Severn Estuary versions of Kiss were previously known as Vibe FM with DJs Nikki Elise and Ric Groves. EMAP bought the stations from Scottish Radio Holdings in August 2005, and rebranded them in September 2006.

In July 2023, Ofcom approved Bauer's request to the change the format of Kiss in the East of England. This meant that from the 12th September 2023, Kiss on 105.6 (Cambridge), 106.4 (Ipswich and Suffolk) and 107.7 (Peterborough) would have its format changed and carry Greatest Hits Radio instead. Kiss would however continue to broadcast on FM to Norwich and Norfolk across 106.1 effectively becoming a small local licence instead of a regional one. The change was approved despite opposition from Nation Broadcasting and Star

=== EMAP rebranding and criticism ===
EMAP took full control of Kiss 100 as early as 1992, but with Mac having left the station in March 1998, EMAP would embark on a rebranding of the station and to align it with the rest of its radio operations.

In December 1998, one of the station's most popular DJs, Steve Jackson, was dismissed resulting in a high-profile court case, whilst the changes led to criticism from both former presenters and listeners alike, concerned that Kiss 100 was losing its musical direction. DJs Coldcut, Bob Jones, and Manasseh quit the station in January 1999 in protest at the changes being implemented. Other DJs at this time were being lured away by the increasingly dance-oriented BBC Radio 1.

Mark Story (previously of Magic 105.4) was appointed as the new Director of Music Programming, along with moving the Kiss studios and office to EMAPs main premises at Mappin House, Central London, and creating a new logo. Andy Roberts became Kiss Programme Director.

In July 1999, The Independent reported: "In preparation for the new ad campaign, the biggest in the station's history, EMAP has spent twelve months changing the output of the station. Over ten DJs have parted company with the station, including Steve Jackson, who won the Sony breakfast show award this year. In the words of Mr Cox [EMAP marketing director], the music on the station has been "smoothed out"."

=== Ofcom record fine ===
In June 2006, Kiss 100 was fined £175,000 (equivalent to £302,000 in 2025) by media regulator Ofcom, a record fee for any UK commercial radio station. Ofcom punished Kiss 100 for "numerous and serious breaches" of broadcasting codes after receiving ten complaints from April to November 2005. They involved prank calls on the Bam Bam breakfast show where consent was not sought from the "victims" and controversial material aired when children were likely to be listening. Kiss 100 said it accepted the findings and apologised for any offence

=== Second rebranding and Kiss network ===
EMAP introduced a second major revamp of the Kiss brand on 6 September 2006. This included a new logo designed by oddlondon, a renewed focus on dance music, more specialist shows and a new website for all three Kiss stations, replacing the previous website.

The relaunch was implemented simultaneously with the rebranding of Kiss 100's sister dance stations, Vibe 101 and Vibe 105–108 as Kiss 101 and Kiss 105-108 respectively. Changes at Kiss 100 were introduced to address falling listener figures and to keep the station competitive in the highly contested London market. Roberts became its Group Programme Director.

A year later, EMAP sold its radio division to Bauer Radio.

=== DAB changes and Rodigan departure ===
In December 2010, Ofcom approved the request from Bauer to drop local programming content from the three Kiss stations, creating a national service on the condition that Kiss would be available on 35 DAB multiplexes around the UK on the day local information is dropped, rising to 38 within three months of the changes.

On 27 December 2012, Kiss 100 appeared nationally on Digital One's national DAB multiplex.

David Rodigan, who had been with Kiss since its legal launch in 1990, resigned in November 2012, citing the "continued marginalisation of reggae music" on the station.

Under Roberts, Kiss extended its stations, launching Kisstory in May 2013.

=== Norway and Finland ===
On 26 February 2016, Kiss was launched in Norway rebranded from The Voice Hiphop & RnB Norway and Finland.

=== FM changes ===
In January 2023, station owners Bauer submitted plans to Ofcom to change the format of the FM frequencies held by Kiss on 105.6 MHz (Cambridge), 106.4 MHz (Suffolk) and 107.7 MHz (Peterborough). The application was approved in July 2023, with the frequencies becoming relays of Greatest Hits Radio, leaving Kiss on 100 MHz (London), 97.2 MHz (Bristol), 101 MHz (Severn Estuary) and 106.1 MHz (Norwich).

In August 2024, Bauer announced that Kiss would be replaced on FM in London, the Severn Estuary and Norwich by Hits Radio, with Kiss retaining its frequency in Bristol. Then on 20 September 2024, Bauer announced that the switch will take place on 23 September, sooner than expected as it was believed that Bauer would wait until the new Media Act became law, eliminating the need to make a format change request to Ofcom. It was also announced that the 97.2 frequency in Bristol will also carry Hits Radio. On 22 September 2024, at 10 pm, Kiss became digital only.

=== DAB+ Switchover ===
In February 2025, it was announced that Kiss, along with Kisstory and several other Bauer-owned stations would be switched to stereo DAB+ from 31 March 2025.

== Programming ==
Programming is produced and broadcast from Bauer's London headquarters at The Lantern.

== Logo history ==
Kiss FM logo from 1985 to 1989

Kiss FM logo from 1990 to 1999

Kiss FM logo from 1999 to 2006

Kiss logo from 2006 to 2026

== DJs/presenters ==
=== Pirate and early legal era ===
From 1985, DJs and presenters have included: Norman Jay, Coldcut (Matt Black & Jonathan More), Paul Trouble Anderson, Colin Faver, Judge Jules, Tim Westwood, Jazzie B, Steve Jackson, Trevor Nelson, Lisa I'Anson, Danny Rampling, and Richie Rich. At its legal launch and early 1990s, this would also include Graham Gold, Dave Pearce, David Rodigan, Patrick Forge, Somethin' Else (Chris Phillips & Jez Nelson), and Gilles Peterson.

=== Mid to late 1990s ===
In the mid-late 1990s, DJs and presenters have included: Tall Paul, Matt Jam Lamont, Dreem Teem, Fabio & Grooverider, Pete Wardman, Brandon Block, Jumpin Jack Frost, Kenny Ken, DJ Hype, Ray Keith, R-Solution (4hero & Kirk Degiorgio), Tony De Vit, and Slipmatt.

=== 2000s ===
Since 2000, DJs and presenters have included: Bam Bam, Andy C, John Digweed, Ali B, Robin Banks, Adam F, DJ EZ, Carl Cox, DJ Hype, Logan Sama, DJ Hatcha, Paul Oakenfold, Armin van Buuren, Rickie Haywood Williams, Melvin Odoom, Charlie Hedges, Hed Kandi, Philip George, DJ S.K.T, Jordan Banjo and Perri Kiely, Andi Durrant, Danny Lee and Tyler West.

== See also ==
- Kiss Does... Rave
