= Kiss 105-108 =

London; England
- Broadcast area: East of England
- Frequencies: 105.6 MHz FM (Cambridge); 106.1 MHz FM (Norwich); 106.4 MHz FM (Ipswich & Colchester); 107.7 MHz FM (Peterborough)
- Branding: KISS

Programming
- Format: Dance / hip hop / R&B

Ownership
- Owner: Kiss Network, Bauer Radio

History
- First air date: 6 September 2006
- Last air date: 23 September 2023

Links
- Website: KISS FM UK

Kiss 105-108 was an Independent Local Radio station serving East Anglia from the Kiss Network. All programming after 2010 was networked from the national station KISS.

== History ==
The station was founded by the Essex Radio Group, who at the time owned a handful of local radio stations, the largest being Essex FM (now Heart East). Shortly after the group was bought by Daily Mail and in 1998 acquired by DMGT.

In 2000, the Essex Radio Group concern of DMGT was purchased by the GWR Group, (now 'Global') in a joint venture with Scottish Radio Holdings (SRH). At this point in time the GWR group also acquired Galaxy 101 in Bristol (Renamed to Vibe 101) from the Chrysalis media group (now 'Global'), extending the Vibe brand to South Wales and the West. For ownership reasons, the two Vibe stations were 'owned' by Vibe Radio Holdings, a company invented by and jointly owned by GWR and SRH. SRH bought both Vibe stations outright from GWR in 2003.

In June 2005, the EMAP group acquired SRH. Emap's radio stations and public magazines was then bought by Bauer in January 2008.

In July 2023, Ofcom approved Bauer's request to change the programming transmitted on 105.6 MHz (Cambridge), 106.4 MHz (Suffolk) and 107.7 MHz (Peterborough) transmitters to Greatest Hits Radio, leaving Kiss on 106.1 MHz (Norwich). The change was approved despite opposition from Nation Broadcasting and Star on the basis that Bauer could demonstrate market demand for the change of format.

== Audience figures ==
The station achieved RAJAR 11 consecutive quarterly year on year increases whilst local programmed during key dayparts (under Programme Director Glen White with Stuart Grant on the breakfast show and Michael Lewis on Drivetime) from 2007 to 2010.

== Technical ==
=== FM ===
Suffolk, Norfolk, Cambridgeshire, North Essex 106.4 FM Mendlesham transmitting station Main Transmitter.

North East Norfolk 106.1 FM Stoke Holy Cross Filler Transmitter.

Cambridgeshire 105.6 & 107.7 FM Madingley & Gunthorpe Filler Transmitters.

The station had four transmitters in the East of England, Mendlesham transmitting station in Suffolk on 106.4 at 20KW which could be heard across Suffolk, Norfolk, Cambridgeshire and North Essex. It also had three filler transmitters provided to serve the major cities and surrounding towns. From Stoke Holy Cross near Norwich on 106.1 at 4KW to North Walsham, Wymondham and Great Yarmouth. From Madingley near Cambridge on 105.6 at 1KW to Ely, Newmarket and St Ives and Gunthorpe in Peterborough on 107.7 at a lower power of 200W, which can be heard across the whole of Greater Peterborough, Market Deeping, Crowland, Spalding, Yaxley and Whittlesey.

Kiss 105-108 could frequently be heard across South Lincolnshire, South Essex, and even the edge of Bedfordshire and Greater London, although it did not serve these areas.

=== DAB ===
Kiss 105-108 broadcast on DAB format to Cambridge, Norwich and Peterborough, however this was replaced by a national relay of Kiss 100 in 2013.

== See also ==
- Kiss Network
- Kiss TV
