= Chrysalis Group =

UK media company

logo

Chrysalis Group was a UK media company that was founded by Chris Wright, chairman, and Terry Ellis. Wright was named in Sunday Times Rich List 2009 of the 1,000 richest persons in the UK. Previously having interests in television, books and radio, Chrysalis now focuses on the areas of music publishing, music recording, artist management and entertainment product distribution. The music branch includes The Hit Label, Echo and Papillon Records.

The television arm was sold to All3Media in 2003. Chrysalis Records was sold to EMI in 1991, Chrysalis' song publishing was acquired by BMG Rights Management in September 2010. Universal Music Group absorbed most of EMI in 2012. The record label was then bought by the Warner Music Group. They in turn sold the Chrysalis Books Group to Anova Books, including the imprints Batsford and Robson Books, in 2005. On 25 June 2007 Chrysalis Radio was sold for £170 million to Global Radio.

Blue Raincoat Music bought most of Chrysalis from Warner Music in May 2016. In August 2019, Reservoir Media Management acquired Blue Raincoat.

== See also ==
- Chrysalis Music
