= 1997 in the United Kingdom =

Events from the year 1997 in the United Kingdom. This year is noted for a landslide general election victory for the Labour Party under Tony Blair; the handover of Hong Kong, the largest remaining British colony, to China, with Hong Kong become an administrative region of China; and the death of Diana, Princess of Wales.

== Incumbents ==
- Monarch – Elizabeth II
- Prime Minister
  - John Major (Conservative) (until 2 May)
  - Tony Blair (Labour) (starting 2 May)

== Events ==
=== January ===
- 6 January – Allegations of a Conservative MP's extramarital affair appear in the News of the World newspaper a week after Conservative Prime Minister John Major put "the family" at the heart of his campaign. Jerry Hayes – married with two children – denies the allegations.
- 7 January – 2.5 million people take part in a phone-in vote as part of an ITV debate on the British monarchy. A 2-1 majority vote in favour of retaining the institution.
- 9 January – British yachtsman Tony Bullimore is rescued in the Southern Ocean five days after his boat capsized in freezing waters.
- 15 January
  - Diana, Princess of Wales, calls for an international ban on landmines.
  - The strengthening economy is reflected in a national unemployment total of 1,884,700 for last December – the lowest level since January 1991. The Conservative government who are mired in allegations of sleaze are still behind Labour in the opinion polls as the general election looms.
- 16 January
  - The Conservative Party government loses its majority in the House of Commons following the death of Iain Mills, MP for Meriden.
  - Chris Evans resigns from BBC Radio 1 after his request for a four-day week is refused. Since joining the station as a breakfast-time DJ in 1995 Evans had boosted audience numbers by 700,000.
- 17 January
  - A jury at the Old Bailey rules that 86-year-old Szymon Serafinowicz is unfit to stand trial on charges of murdering Jews during The Holocaust.
  - East 17 singer Brian Harvey is dismissed from the band after publicly commenting that the drug Ecstasy is safe.
- 20 January – Death of Labour Party MP Martin Redmond ends the government's minority. On the same day, the party promises not to raise income tax if, as seems likely, it wins the forthcoming general election.
- 30 January – An underground anti-road protest ends as the last protester, known as "Swampy" (Daniel Hooper), emerges from the network of tunnels beneath the A30 extension site in Devon.

=== February ===
- 4 February – Moors Murderer Myra Hindley is informed by Home Secretary Michael Howard that she will never be released from prison. Hindley, who has now been in prison for more than 30 years, was issued with a whole life tariff in 1990 by the then Home Secretary David Waddington but not informed of the ruling until just over two years ago.
- 6 February – The Court of Appeal rules that Mrs Diane Blood of Leeds can be inseminated with her dead husband's sperm. Mrs Blood has been challenging for the right to use the sperm of her husband Stephen since just after his death two years ago.
- 12 February – A 23 year old British soldier is shot dead in Northern Ireland. Lance Bombardier Stephen Restorick is shot by a sniper while manning a checkpoint in Bessbrook (County Armagh); he is the last British soldier to be killed by the Provisional IRA.
- 14 February – The Daily Mail newspaper names and accuses five young men of the murder of Stephen Lawrence on its front page the day after a coroner's inquest finds that the teenager had been unlawfully killed in an unprovoked racist attack by five white youths in April 1993.
- 15 February – Murder of Billie-Jo Jenkins, a 13 year old girl, in Hastings, East Sussex, who is beaten to death at the family home. Her stepfather Siôn Jenkins is convicted of her murder in 1998 but formally acquitted after a hung jury at a second retrial in 2006.
- 22 February – Scientists at the Roslin Institute announce the birth of a cloned sheep named Dolly seven months after the fact.
- 24 February – At the Brit Awards 1997, Geri Halliwell wears her iconic Union Jack dress.
- 27 February
  - The government loses its Commons majority again after a Labour victory at the Wirral South by-election.
  - The Firearms (Amendment) Act 1997, together with the Firearms (Amendment) (No. 2) Act 1997 of 27 November, prohibit personal ownership of almost all handguns.

=== March ===
- 10 March – 160 vehicles are involved in a motorway pile up on the M42 motorway at Bromsgrove, Worcestershire. Three people are killed and 60 injured.
- 17 March – John Major announces that the general election will be held on 1 May. Despite the opinion polls having shown a double-digit Labour lead continuously since late 1992, Major is hoping for a unique fifth successive term of Conservative government by pinning his hopes on a strong economy and low unemployment – no incoming government since before the First World War has inherited economic statistics as strong as the ones that Labour will should they win the election.
- 18 March – The Sun newspaper, a traditional supporter of the Conservative Party, declares its support for Tony Blair and Labour, condemning the Conservatives as "tired, divided and rudderless" – a stark contrast to its support for them in the run-up to the 1992 election where it waged a high-profile campaign against the then Labour leader Neil Kinnock and following the Conservative victory, claimed responsibility for the result.
- 23 March – Unemployed continues to fall and now stands at just over 1,800,000 – its lowest level since December 1990.
- 30 March – Channel 5, Britain's fifth terrestrial television channel and its first new one since the launch of Channel 4 in November 1982, is launched.
- 31 March – BBC preschool children's television series Teletubbies first airs.

=== April ===
- April – Nursery Education Voucher Scheme introduced, guaranteeing a government-funded contribution to the cost of preschool education for 4-year-olds.
- 1 April – Following the handover of ScotRail to National Express, the final British Rail passenger service, the Caledonian Sleeper to Fort William, reaches its destination, ending the process of privatisation of passenger services brought about by the Railways Act 1993.
- 8 April
  - BBC journalist Martin Bell announces that he is to stand as an independent parliamentary candidate against Neil Hamilton in the Tatton constituency on an anti-corruption platform.
  - A MORI opinion poll shows Conservative support at a four-year high of 34%, but Labour still look set to win next month's general election as they have a 15-point lead.
- 29 April – The last MORI poll before the election tips Labour for a landslide victory as they gain 48% of the vote and a 20-point lead over the Conservatives.

=== May ===
- 1 May – General election:
  - The Labour Party under Tony Blair defeat the incumbent Conservative government under Prime Minister John Major in a landslide result, winning an all-time record for any party of 418 seats, with a swing of −10.23 points.
  - Several high-profile Conservative MPs, including seven Cabinet ministers lose their seats, as do all Conservative MPs in Scotland and Wales. Michael Portillo, who was tipped by many to be the next leader of the Conservatives, is among those who lose their seats. The Conservatives fail to make any gains.
  - A record 120 women enter parliament, including 101 female Labour MPs.
  - Mohammad Sarwar, elected for Labour in Glasgow Govan, becomes the first ever Muslim MP.
- 2 May – Labour being the largest party holding a majority following the general election, Conservative John Major resigns and Tony Blair is appointed Prime Minister of the United Kingdom by The Queen.
- 3 May – Katrina and the Waves win the Eurovision Song Contest (held in Dublin) with the song Love Shine a Light, the first time the UK has won the competition since 1981.
- 6 May – New Chancellor of the Exchequer, Gordon Brown announces that the Bank of England, central bank of the UK, is to assume independent responsibility for UK monetary policy.
- 19 May – The new Labour government announces that it will prohibit tobacco sponsorship of sporting events.

=== June ===
- June – Ford enters the growing compact coupe market with its Puma, which uses the same chassis as the Ka and Fiesta.
- 2 June – The Halifax Building Society floats on the London Stock Exchange. Over 7.5 million customers of the Society become shareholders of the new bank, the largest extension of shareholders in UK history.
- 12 June – Law Lords declare that former Home Secretary, Michael Howard, acted illegally in raising the minimum sentence of the two juveniles who committed the murder of James Bulger, Robert Thompson and Jon Venables, to 15 years. They also strip the government of setting minimum terms for prisoners aged under 18 who had received life or indefinite prison sentences.
- 19 June
  - The High Court of Justice delivers judgement, largely in favour of McDonald's, in the libel case of McDonald's Corporation v Steel & Morris ("the McLibel case"), the longest trial in English legal history, against two environmental campaigners.
  - William Hague is elected as the leader of the Conservative Party.
- 23 June – Construction begins on the Millennium Dome in Greenwich.
- 25 June – An auction of dresses owned by Diana, Princess of Wales, in Manhattan raises more than £2 million for charity.
- 26 June – Publication of J. K. Rowling's first Harry Potter fantasy novel, Harry Potter and the Philosopher's Stone, in London by Bloomsbury Publishing, in an edition of 500 copies.
- 30 June - Essex band The Prodigy released The Fat of the Land which broke a Guinness World Record for the fastest selling dance album of all time.

=== July ===
- 1 July – The UK transfers sovereignty over Hong Kong, the largest remaining British colony, to the People's Republic of China as the 99 years lease on the territory formally ends. This event is widely considered by historians and commentators to mark the end of the British Empire, the largest imperial endeavour in the history of mankind, with Hong Kong, now part of SAR.
- 2 July – Chancellor Gordon Brown launches the first Labour budget for nearly 20 years, which includes a further £3billion for education and healthcare, as well as a £3.5billion scheme to get single mothers, under 25's and long term unemployed people back into work.
- 4 July – Russian carmaker Lada announces the end of exports to the United Kingdom after 23 years and some 350,000 sales of its low-priced, low-specification cars, which at their peak sold more than 30,000 cars a year but managed just over 6,000 sales last year.
- 6–11 July – 1997 nationalist riots in Northern Ireland: there is violence in nationalist areas after an Orange Order parade is allowed down the Garvaghy Road in Portadown by the Royal Ulster Constabulary as part of the Drumcree conflict.
- 19 July – The IRA declares a ceasefire.
- 30 July – Sunderland's Stadium of Light, the largest football club stadium to be built in England since the 1920s, is opened by the Duke of York.
- 31 July
  - Education (Schools) Act abolishes the Assisted Places Scheme (free or publicly-subsidised places for qualifying children attending fee-paying independent schools).
  - At the Uxbridge by-election, John Randall holds the seat for the Conservatives.

=== August ===
- 2 August
  - John Major's Prime Minister's Resignation Honours are announced.
  - The comedy film Bean is released in movie theaters.
- 14 August – Derby County F.C. move into their new Pride Park stadium, but their inaugural match against Wimbledon in the FA Premier League is abandoned in the second half due to floodlight failure.
- 21 August – The new Oasis album, Be Here Now, is released – selling a record of more than 350,000 copies on its first day.
- 27 August
  - An international survey shows that British rail fares are the most expensive in the world and have risen by 12% since privatisation.
  - Stoke City F.C. move into their new Britannia Stadium, which is officially opened by football legend Sir Stanley Matthews.
- 31 August – Reports emerge in the early hours of the morning that Diana, Princess of Wales, has been injured in a car crash in Paris which has claimed the life of Dodi Fayed, the Harrods heir. Within four hours, it is confirmed that Diana has died in hospital as a result of her injuries.

=== September ===
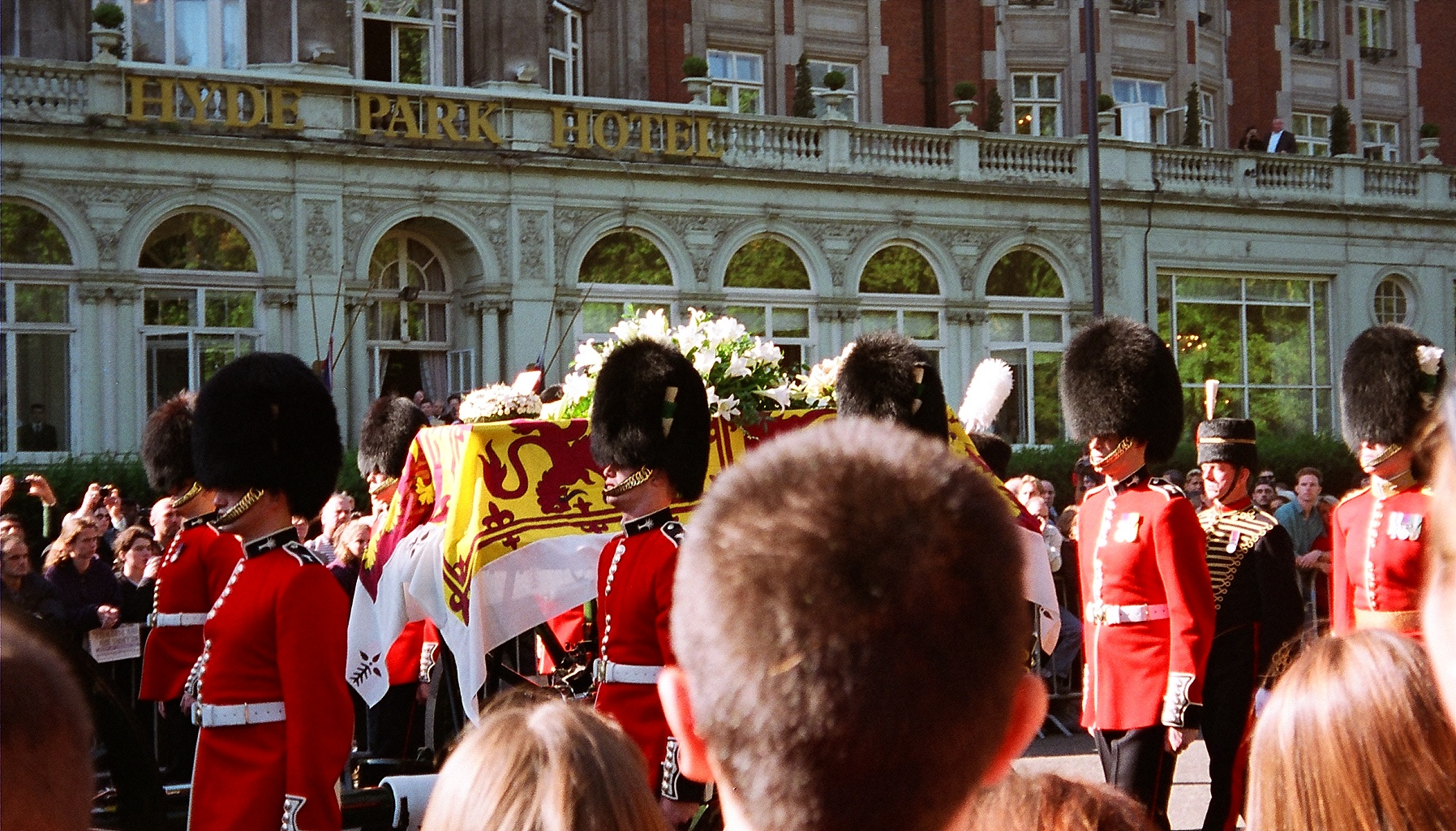
The funeral cortege of Diana, Princess of Wales

- 1 September
  - French investigators reveal that Diana's driver, Henri Paul, who was also killed, was over the drink-driving limit and had been travelling at speeds in excess of 100 mph before the crash that killed her. The only survivor of the crash is bodyguard Trevor Rees-Jones, who is seriously ill in hospital. Lawyers for Mohamed Al-Fayed, father of Dodi Al-Fayed, lay the blame on the paparazzi who were pursuing the vehicle.
  - A new style of fifty pence coin is introduced.
  - Reebok Stadium, the new home of Bolton Wanderers F.C., is opened by deputy Prime Minister John Prescott.
- 2 September – 18 year old West Ham United footballer Rio Ferdinand is dropped from the England squad after being convicted of a drink-driving offence.
- 5 September – The Queen makes a nationwide broadcast in tribute to Diana, Princess of Wales, following widespread criticism of the Royal Family's response to her death.
- 6 September – The funeral of Diana, Princess of Wales takes place at Westminster Abbey, London followed by a private burial at the estate of the Earls Spencer in Althorp, Northamptonshire. The Earl Spencer, brother of Diana, attacks the Royal Family's and the media's treatment of Diana in his funeral eulogy. TV coverage of the funeral is hosted by both BBC 1 and ITV, attracting an audience of more than 32,000,000 which falls just short of the national TV audience record set by the England national football team's victorious World Cup final in 1966.
- 7 September – Clyde Auditorium in Glasgow (the "armadillo"), designed by Foster and Partners, is completed.
- 9 September – A 40-year-old woman from Bradford in West Yorkshire wins £14,000 damages after suing her ex-husband for rape in what is the first civil action of its kind in Britain.
- 11 September – Referendum in Scotland on the creation of a national Parliament with devolved powers takes place. On two separate questions, voters back the plans both for a national Parliament and for it to have limited tax raising powers.
- 12 September – Newspapers report that an operation carried out in February by neurosurgeon Steve Gill during which a woman's head was temporarily detached from her spine has been a success
- 13 September – Release of Elton John's Candle in the Wind remade as a tribute to Diana, Princess of Wales. This will be the second best-selling single worldwide of all time.
- 14 September – Conservative Party leader William Hague receives criticism for accusing Prime Minister Tony Blair of exploiting the recent death of Diana, Princess of Wales for political advantage.
- 15 September – The ITV detective drama series Prime Suspect which stars actress Helen Mirren wins the Emmy award in the US for best mini-series.
- 16 September – A bomb explodes outside an RUC station in Markethill, County Armagh a day after the start of Northern Ireland peace talks. The IRA deny responsibility.
- 17 September
  - Police investigating the death of Diana, Princess of Wales reveal that the car in which she was travelling may have collided with a white Fiat Uno seconds before hitting a concrete pillar.
  - The Ulster Unionists (the largest loyalist party in Northern Ireland) agree to take part in peace talks that involve Sinn Féin.
- 18 September
  - Welsh devolution referendum on the creation of a national Assembly takes place. Voters in Wales narrowly back the plans.
  - Opening of Sensation exhibition of Young British Artists from the collection of Charles Saatchi at the Royal Academy in London. A portrait of Moors murderer Myra Hindley created from children's handprints by artist Marcus Harvey is removed from display after vandal attacks.
- 19 September – Seven die and 139 are injured in the Southall rail crash when a passenger train passes a danger signal and collides with a freight train.
- 25 September
  - A Saudi court sentences British nurse Lucille McLauchlan to eight years in prison and 500 lashes for being an accessory to the murder of Australian nurse Yvonne Gilford in December the previous year. Fellow British nurse Deborah Parry is charged with murder and could face the death penalty if found guilty. Ms Gilford's brother Frank, is reported to be willing to accept £750,000 in "blood money" for Ms Parry's life to be spared if she is found guilty. Foreign Secretary Robin Cook condemns the sentence of flogging against Ms McLauchlan as "wholly unacceptable in the modern world".
  - RAF pilot Andy Green breaks the land speed record at Black Rock in the Nevada desert. His ThrustSSC jet car sets an average speed of 714 mph, 81 mph faster than the previous record.
- 29 September – British scientists state that they have found a link between Creutzfeldt–Jakob disease and eating of BSE-infected meat.

=== October ===
- 1 October – The final LTI FX4 London taxicab is produced after 39 years.
- 4 October – The BBC introduces its new corporate logo across the corporation, as well as new idents for BBC1 and BBC2.
- 15 October – Andy Green driving the ThrustSSC sets a new land speed record of 763.035 mph (1227.99 km/h), the first time the sound barrier is broken on land.
- 24 October – WPC Nina Mackay, 25, is stabbed to death in Stratford, London, when entering a flat to arrest a Somali asylum seeker who was due to be deported.

=== November ===
- 4 November – BBC News launches a full-time online news service, having already created special websites for the 1995 budget as well as this year's general election and the death of Diana, Princess of Wales.
- 6 November – Labour hold the Paisley South by-election despite a swing of 11.3% to the SNP.
- 9 November – BBC News 24 has launched at 5:30pm for the first night after the final closedown for BBC1.
- 12 November – Brazil's Supreme Court refuses to extradite the Great Train Robber Ronnie Biggs to Britain.
- 17 November – Six Britons are among the 58 people killed by terrorists in the Valley of the Kings, Egypt.
- 20 November
  - The Queen and The Duke of Edinburgh celebrate their 50th wedding anniversary.
  - At the Winchester by-election, Mark Oaten holds the seat for the Liberal Democrats.
- 24 November – The British Library opens its first public reading room at its new London site on the Euston Road.

=== December ===
- 3 December – Andrew Evans, who was convicted of the 1972 murder of 14-year-old Judith Roberts in Tamworth, Staffordshire, has his conviction overturned by the Court of Appeal after the hearing is told he was being treated for depression when he confessed to the crime, and there is no other evidence against him.
- 10 December – John E. Walker wins the Nobel Prize in Chemistry jointly with Paul D. Boyer "for their elucidation of the enzymatic mechanism underlying the synthesis of adenosine triphosphate (ATP)".
- 11 December – The Royal Yacht Britannia is decommissioned after 44 years in service.
- 12 December – The official BBC website is launched.
- 16 December – Beef Bones Regulations 1997 restrict the sale of beef on the bone in response to the UK bovine spongiform encephalopathy outbreak.
- 18 December – The bill to establish the Scottish Parliament unveiled by Secretary of State for Scotland Donald Dewar.
- 19 December
  - William Hague marries Ffion Jenkins.
  - Moors murderer Myra Hindley loses a High Court appeal against the whole life tariff which was imposed on her by Home Secretary David Waddington in 1990 and later confirmed by Waddington's successor Michael Howard.
- 22 December
  - The government announces an independent inquiry into the BSE crisis.
  - Twelve people are arrested during protests by disabled people outside Downing Street.
- 23 December – Rover Group produces the final Rover 100 after 17 years.
- 24 December – Will Straw, son of Cabinet minister Jack Straw, is arrested on suspicion of supplying cannabis.
- 27 December – Ulster Loyalist leader Billy Wright is shot dead in the Maze Prison. Prisoners of the Irish National Liberation Army are believed to have been responsible for Wright's murder.
- 31 December – Singer Elton John and football legend Tom Finney are among the men receiving knighthoods in the New Year's Honours List.

=== Undated ===
- The Weare prison ship is berthed in Portland Harbour as a temporary overflow facility.
- The WOW! Awards organization is founded.
- The Tenants' and Residents' Organisations of England organization is officially recognised.

== Publications ==
- Iain Banks' novel A Song of Stone.
- Ted Hughes' poetry Tales from Ovid.
- Ian McEwan's novel Enduring Love.
- Terry Pratchett's Discworld novel Jingo.
- Philip Pullman's His Dark Materials young-adult fantasy novel The Subtle Knife.
- J. K. Rowling's novel Harry Potter and the Philosopher's Stone.

== Births ==
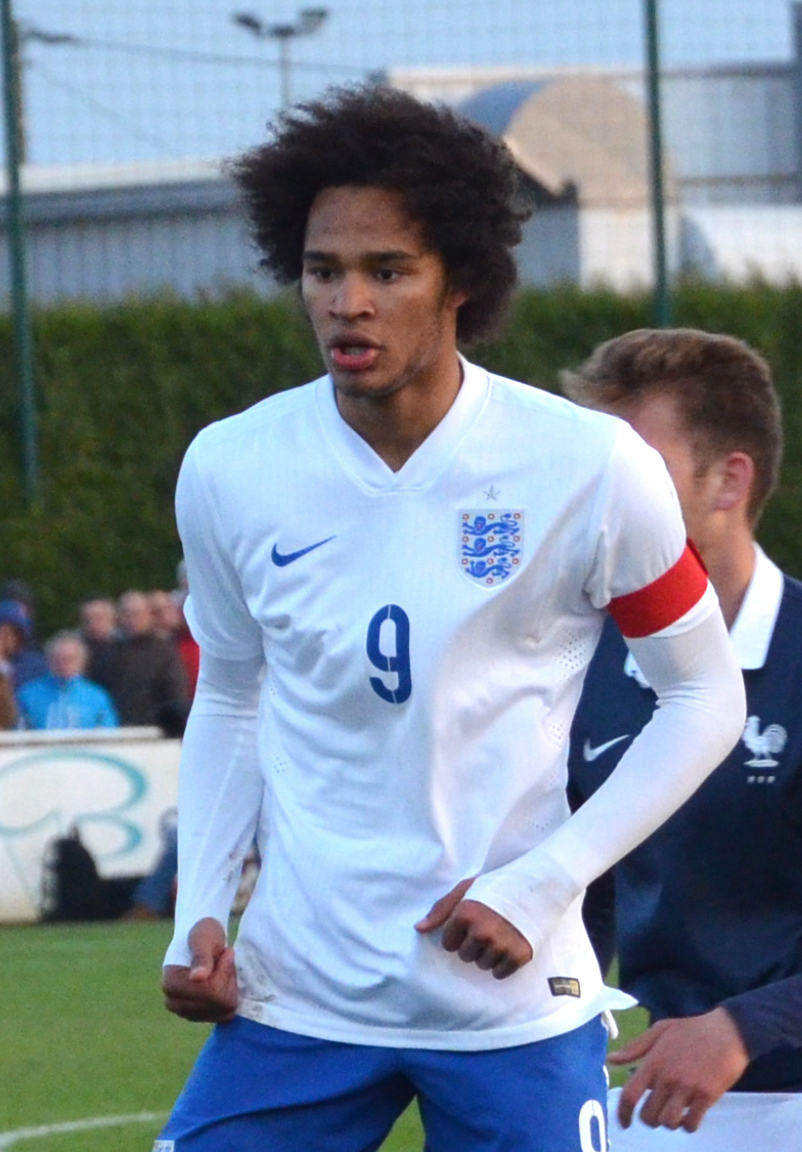
Izzy Brown

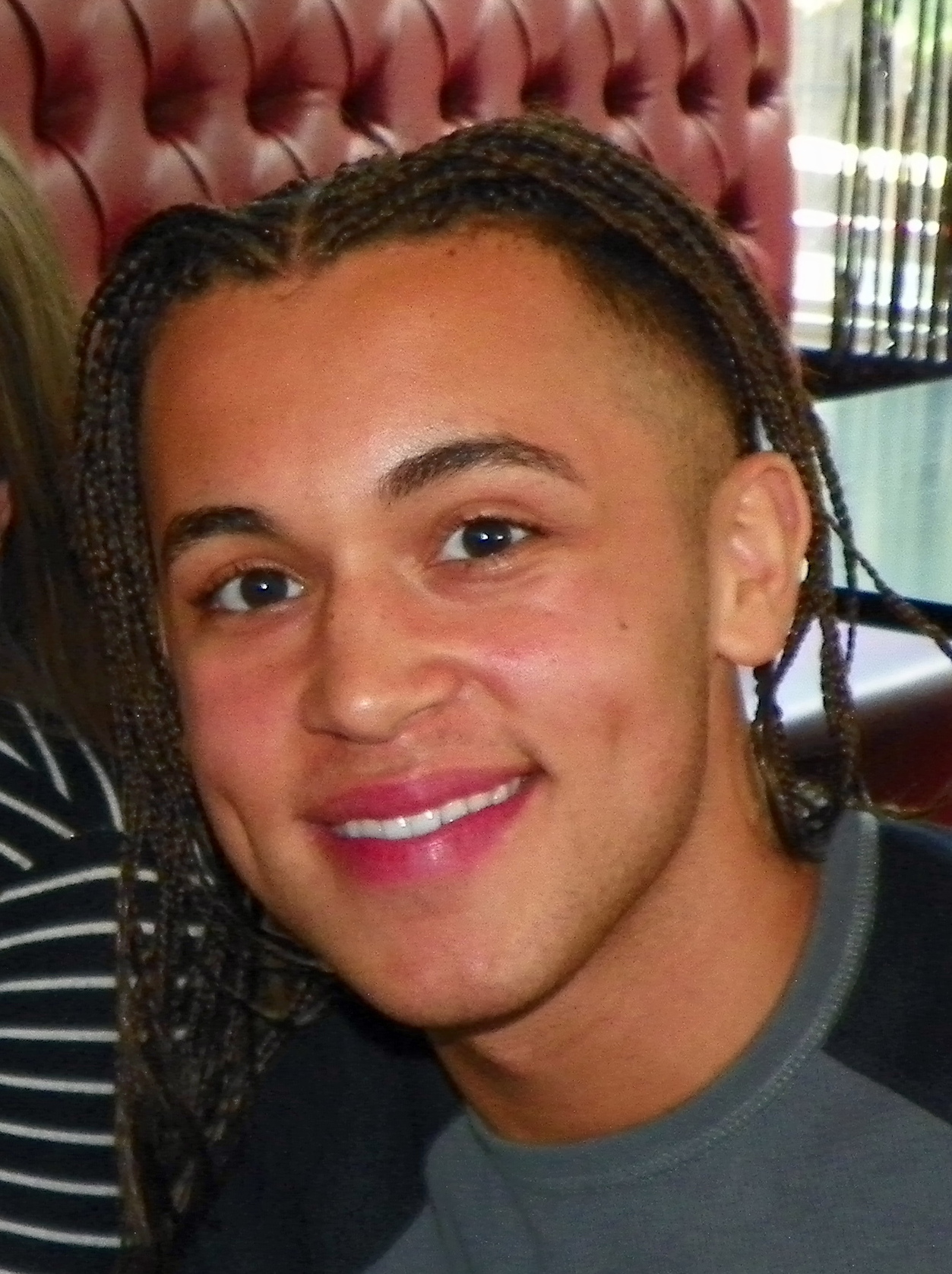
Shaheen Jafargholi

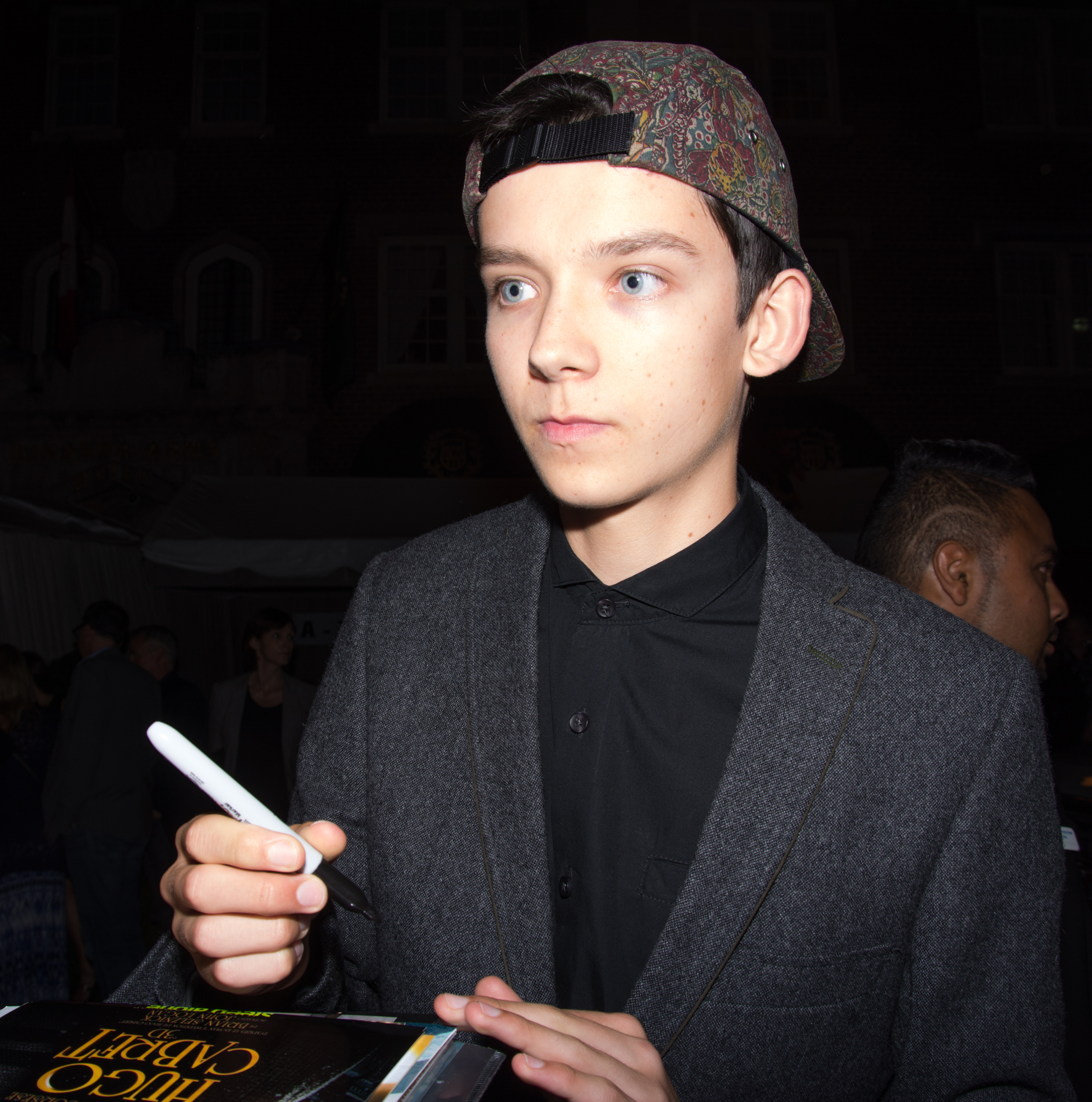
Asa Butterfield

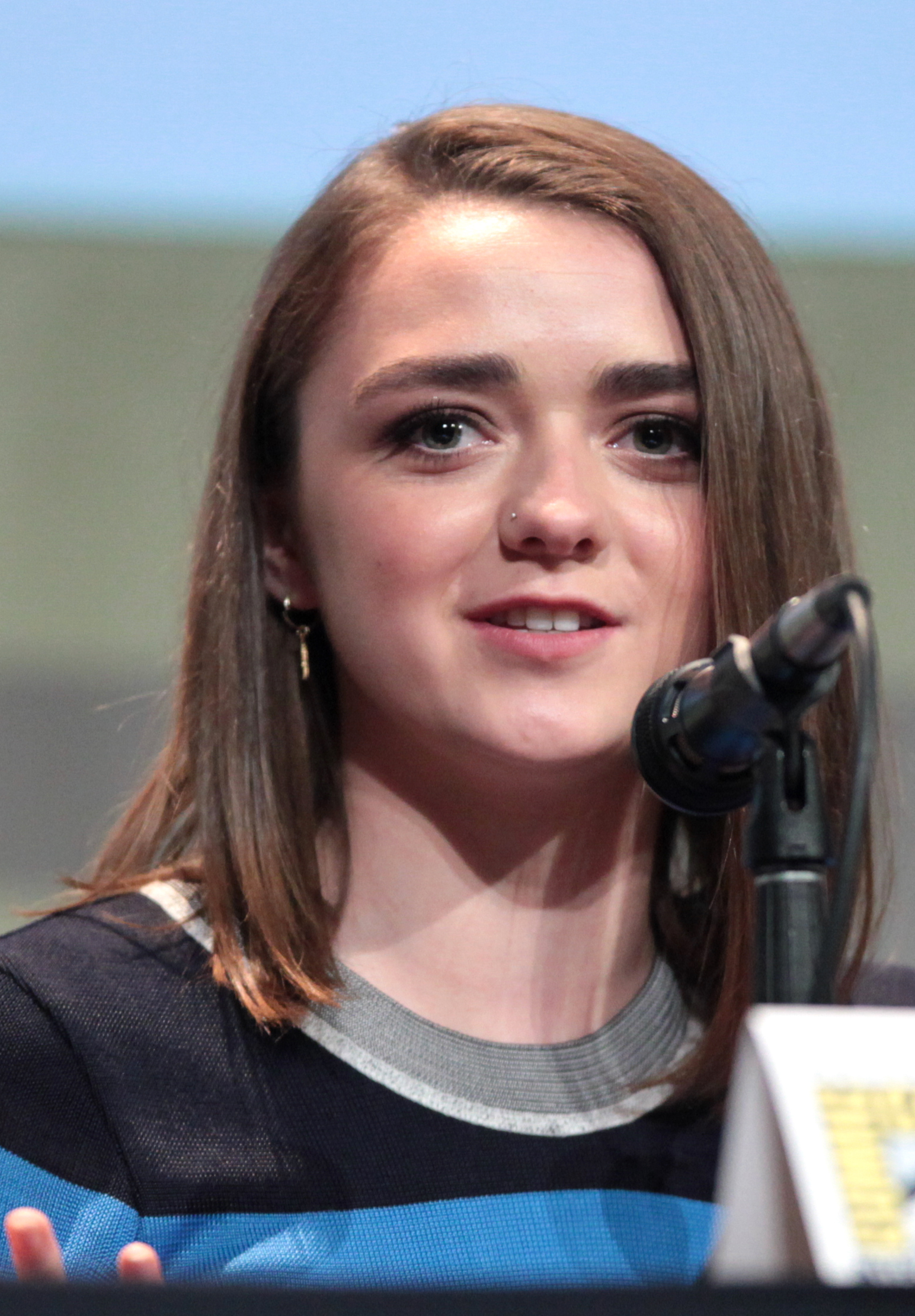
Maisie Williams

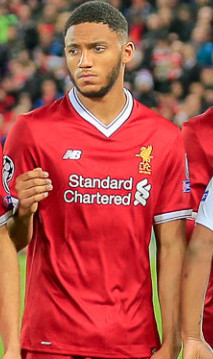
Joe Gomez

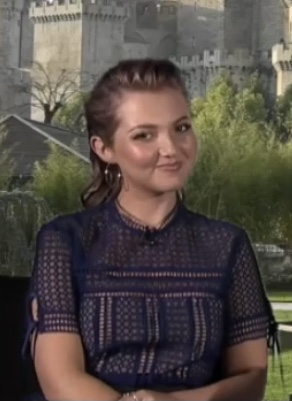
Mia McKenna-Bruce

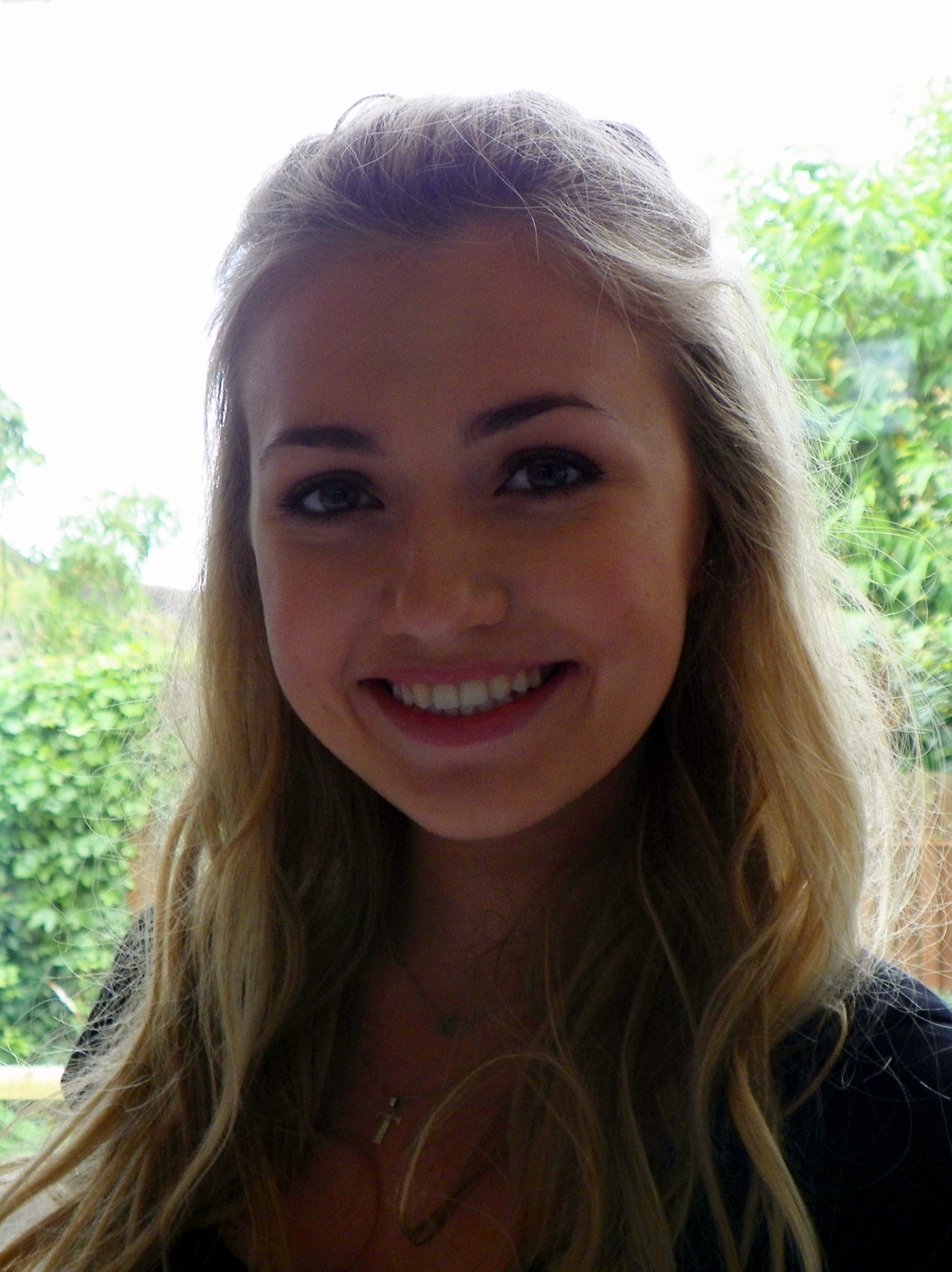
Tilly Keeper

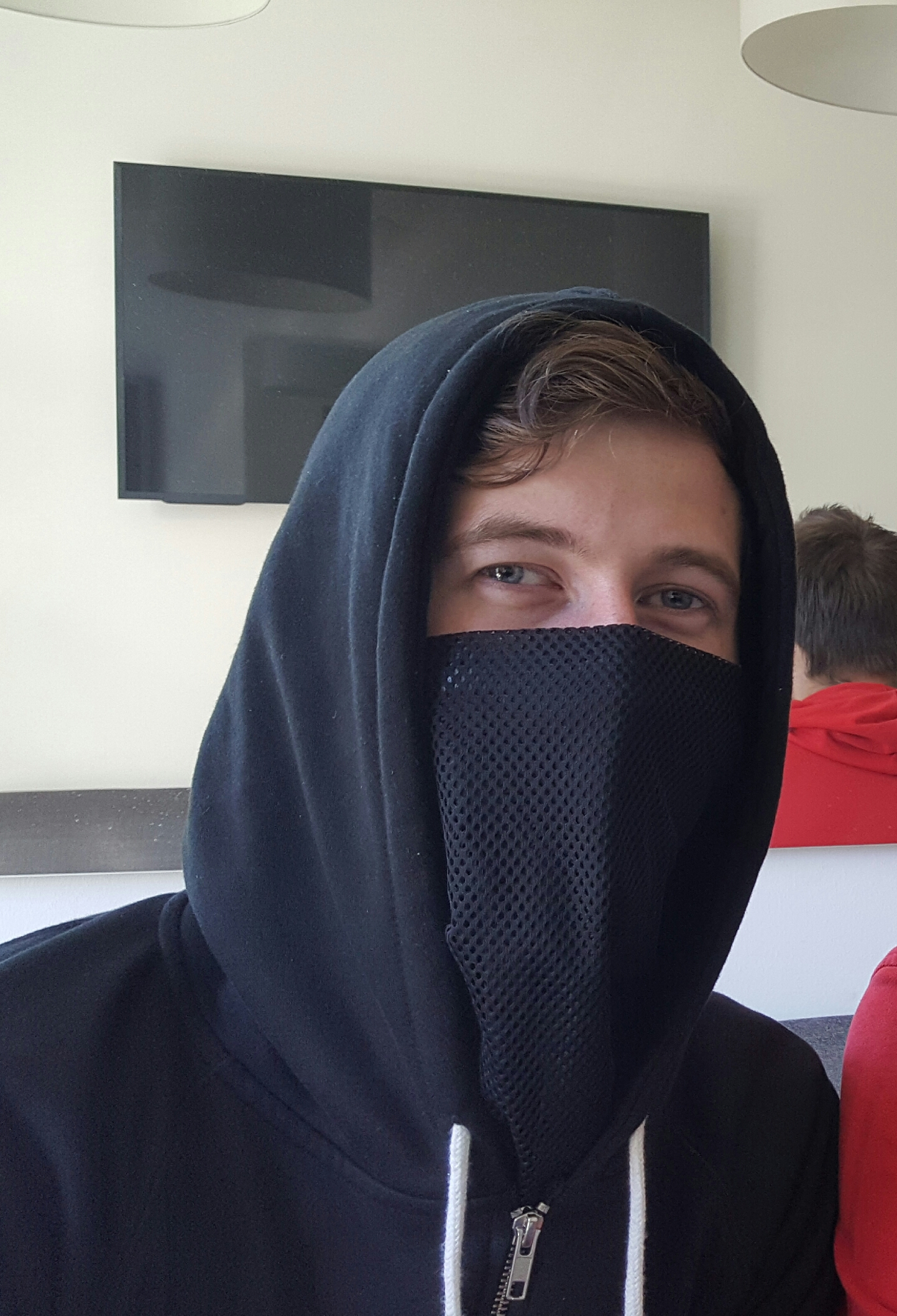
Alan Walker

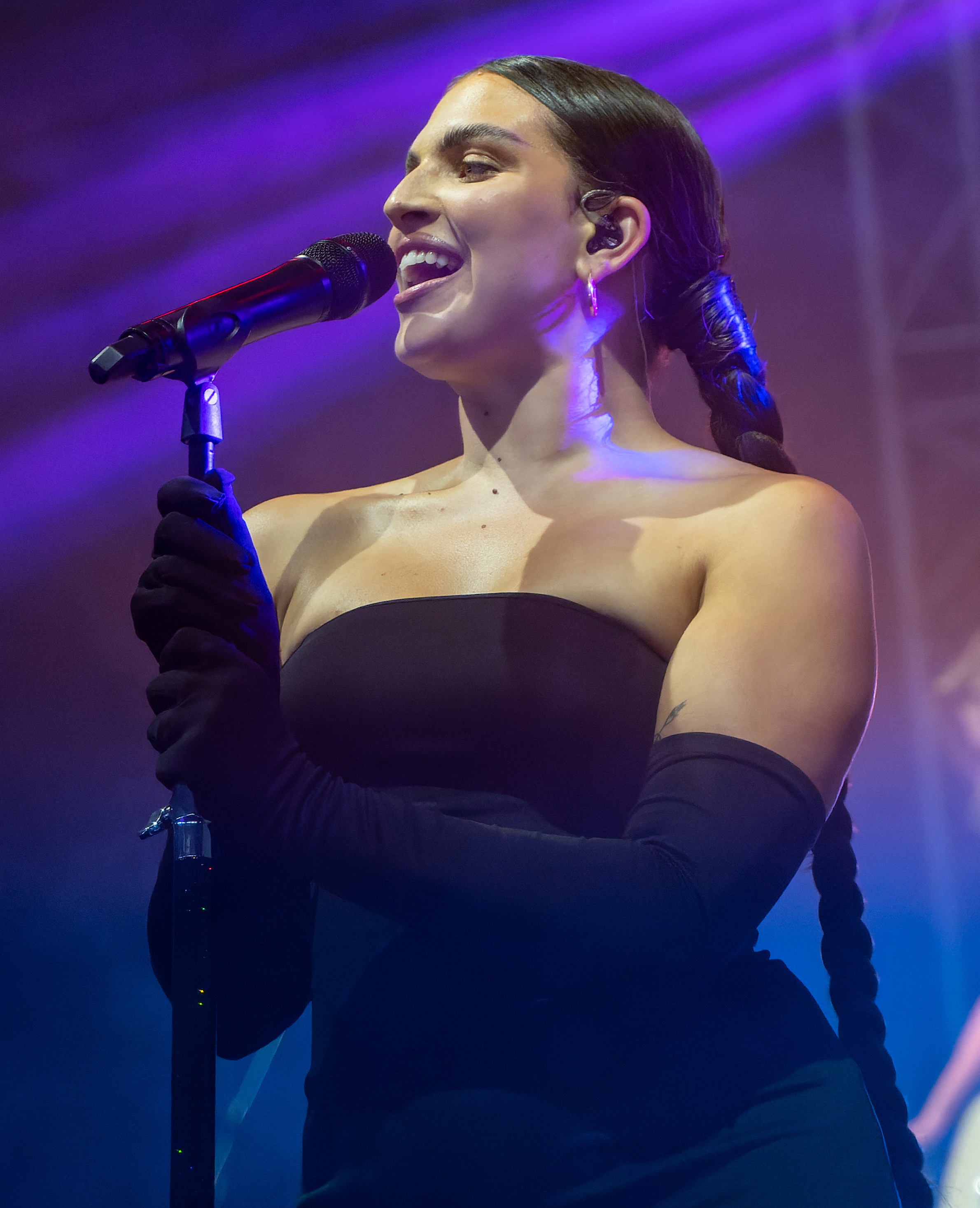
Mae Muller

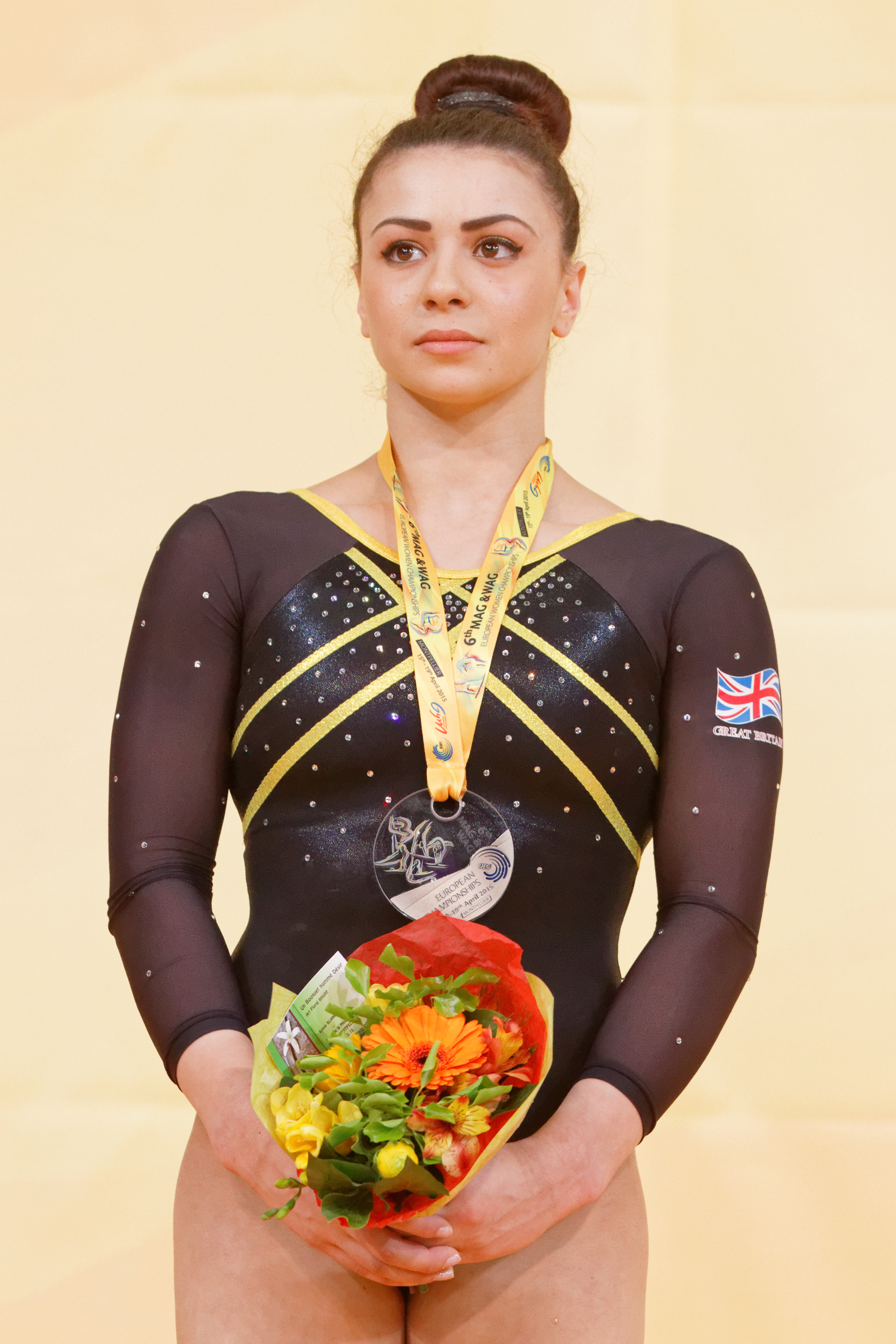
Claudia Fragapane

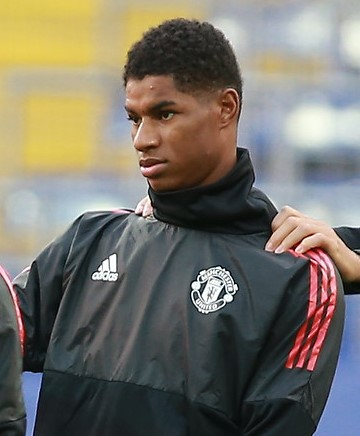
Marcus Rashford

- 1 January – Charlie Fellows, gymnast
- 3 January
  - Joe Morrell, footballer
  - Jordan Thompson, footballer
- 7 January
  - Izzy Brown, footballer
  - Kyle Stanger, actor
- 11 January – Demetri Mitchell, footballer
- 23 January
  - Sophie Hahn, Paralympic sprinter
  - Shaheen Jafargholi, actor and singer
  - Giorgio Rasulo, footballer
- 29 January – Olivia Morris, actress
- 2 February
  - Ellie Bamber, actress
  - Cameron Borthwick-Jackson, footballer
  - Gabby George, footballer
- 3 February – Lewis Cook, footballer
- 5 February – Patrick Roberts, footballer
- 8 February
  - Venus Angelic, singer and vlogger
  - Dalton Smith, boxer
  - Anton Walkes, footballer (died 2023)
- 10 February
  - Adam Armstrong, footballer
  - Lauren Mote, actress
- 12 February – Connor Mahoney, footballer
- 16 February – Charlie Green, singer
- 17 February – Josef Craig, Paralympic swimmer
- 18 February
  - Bradley Collins, footballer
  - Jonathan Haggerty, Muay Thai kickboxer and former ONE Flyweight Muay Thai and current ONE Bantamweight Muay Thai World Champion
  - Jack Rowan, actor
- 21 February – Arwel Robson, rugby union player
- 23 February – Luke Amos, footballer
- 2 March – Matt Weston, skeleton racer
- 4 March – Freddie Woodman, footballer
- 8 March – Kevin Nisbet, footballer
- 12 March – Dean Henderson, footballer
- 14 March – Brad Taylor, cricketer
- 15 March – Jonjoe Kenny, footballer
- 21 March – Nat Phillips, footballer
- 22 March – Harry Wilson, footballer
- 23 March – Aidan Davis, dancer
- 24 March – George Thomas, footballer
- 29 March – Leah Williamson, footballer
- 1 April
  - Asa Butterfield, actor
  - Cian Harries, footballer
  - Olivia Smart, ice dancer
- 3 April – Mitchell Rao, cricketer
- 7 April – Laura van der Heijden, cellist
- 8 April – Keira Walsh, footballer
- 11 April
  - Max Clegg, speedway racer
  - Tully Kearney, swimmer
- 13 April – Kyle Walker-Peters, footballer
- 15 April – Maisie Williams, actress
- 6 May – Duncan Scott, swimmer
- 16 May – Cloe and Holly Mackie, actresses
- 19 May – Olivia Arben, model
- 23 May – Joe Gomez, footballer
- 11 June – Jorja Smith, singer
- 12 June – Gabrielle Jupp, artistic gymnast
- 19 June
  - Sheyi Ojo, footballer
  - Molly Windsor, actress
- 28 June – Connor Edwards, rugby union player
- 3 July – Mia McKenna-Bruce, actress
- 7 July – Viddal Riley, boxer
- 8 July
  - David Brooks, footballer
  - Lauran Hibberd, singer-songwriter
- 13 July – Shayon Harrison, footballer
- 18 July – Fionn Whitehead, actor
- 4 August – Mollie Green, footballer
- 5 August – Clara van Wel, singer-songwriter
- 8 August – Scott Wright, footballer
- 16 August – Tilly Keeper, actress
- 24 August – Alan Walker, English-Norwegian music producer and DJ
- 25 August – Holly Gibbs, actor
- 26 August – Mae Muller, singer-songwriter
- 29 August – Ainsley Maitland-Niles, footballer
- 30 August – Dael Fry, footballer
- 10 September – Paul Smyth, footballer
- 14 September – Dominic Solanke, footballer
- 16 September
  - Amy-Leigh Hickman, actress
  - Oscar Lloyd, actor
- 22 September – Jake Clarke-Salter, footballer
- 23 September
  - Callum Connolly, footballer
  - George Panayi, cricketer
- 24 September – Tosin Adarabioyo, footballer
- 28 September – Ben Green, cricketer
- 1 October
  - Aimee Knight, politician and transgender activist
  - Hamza Choudhury, footballer
- 2 October – Tammy Abraham, footballer
- 8 October
  - Josh Kerr, Olympic middle-distance runner
  - Ben White, footballer
- 10 October – Kieran Dowell, footballer
- 20 October – John Bell, Scottish actor
- 22 October – Joe Rodon, footballer
- 23 October
  - Tallulah Greive, Australian-born Scottish actress
  - Ezri Konsa, footballer
- 24 October
  - Claudia Fragapane, gymnast
  - Raye, pop singer-songwriter
- 26 October – Ryan Patel, cricketer
- 27 October
  - Jess Carter, footballer
  - Eden Taylor-Draper, actor
- 30 October – Sean Longstaff, footballer
- 31 October – Marcus Rashford, footballer
- 5 November
  - Chris Mepham, footballer
  - Greg Taylor, footballer
- 6 November – Hero Fiennes Tiffin, actor
- 9 November – Matthew Fisher, cricketer
- 10 November – Daniel James, footballer
- 14 November – Axel Tuanzebe, footballer
- 15 November
  - Catie Munnings, rally driver
  - Josh Tongue, cricketer
- 17 November – James Whitley, Paralympic skier
- 18 November – Ovie Ejaria, footballer
- 29 November – Michael-Joel David Stuart, actor
- 3 December – Hayley Okines, activist
- 5 December – Sophie Simnett, actress
- 9 December – Harvey Barnes, footballer
- 18 December – Max Holden, cricketer
- 30 December – Michael Newberry, footballer (died 2024)

== Deaths ==
=== January ===
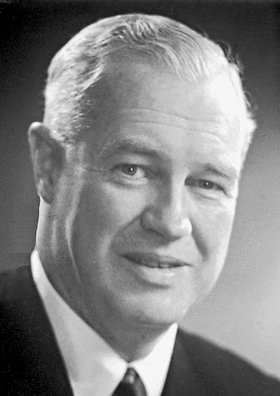
Alexander R. Todd

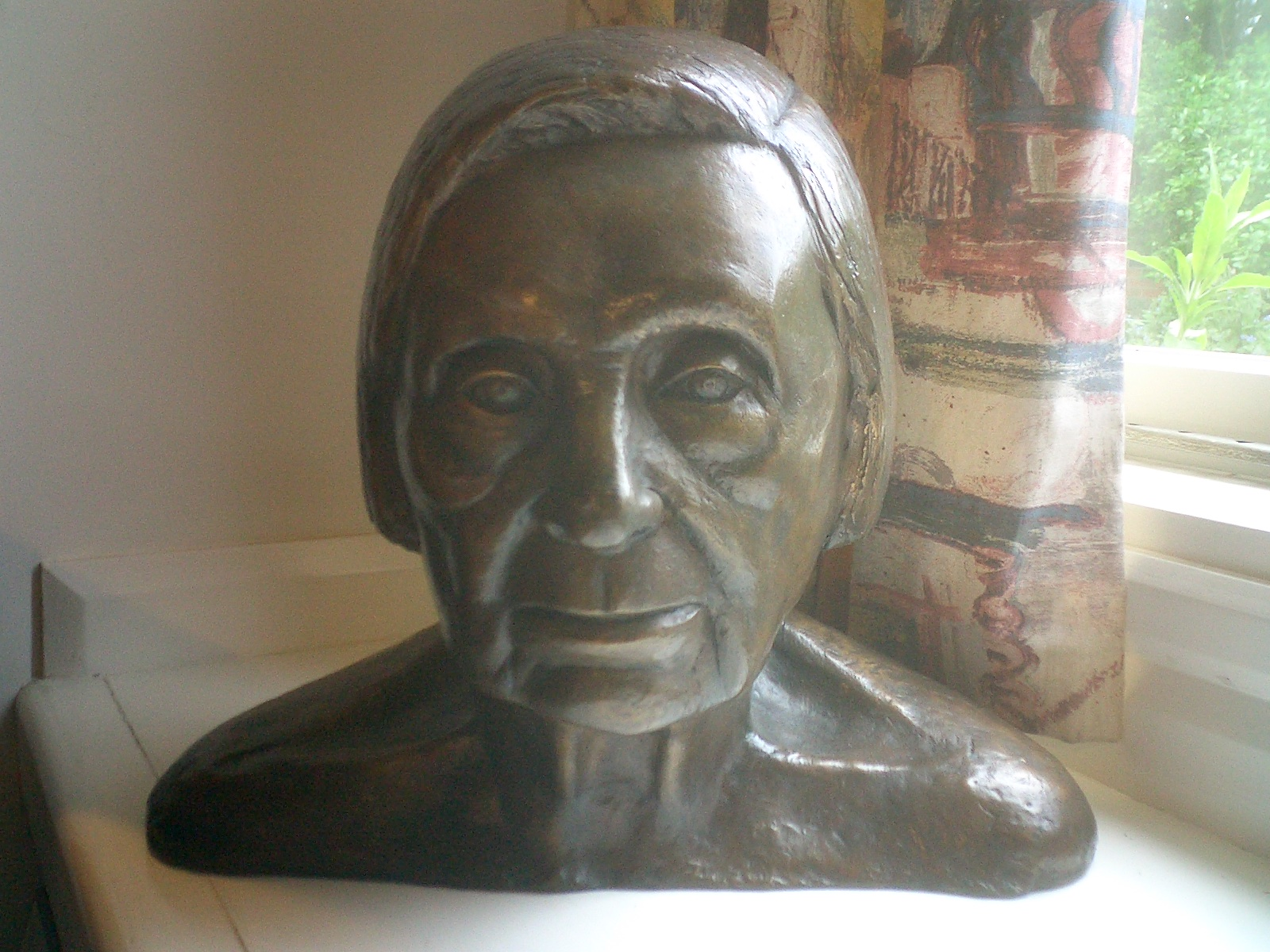
Myfanwy Piper

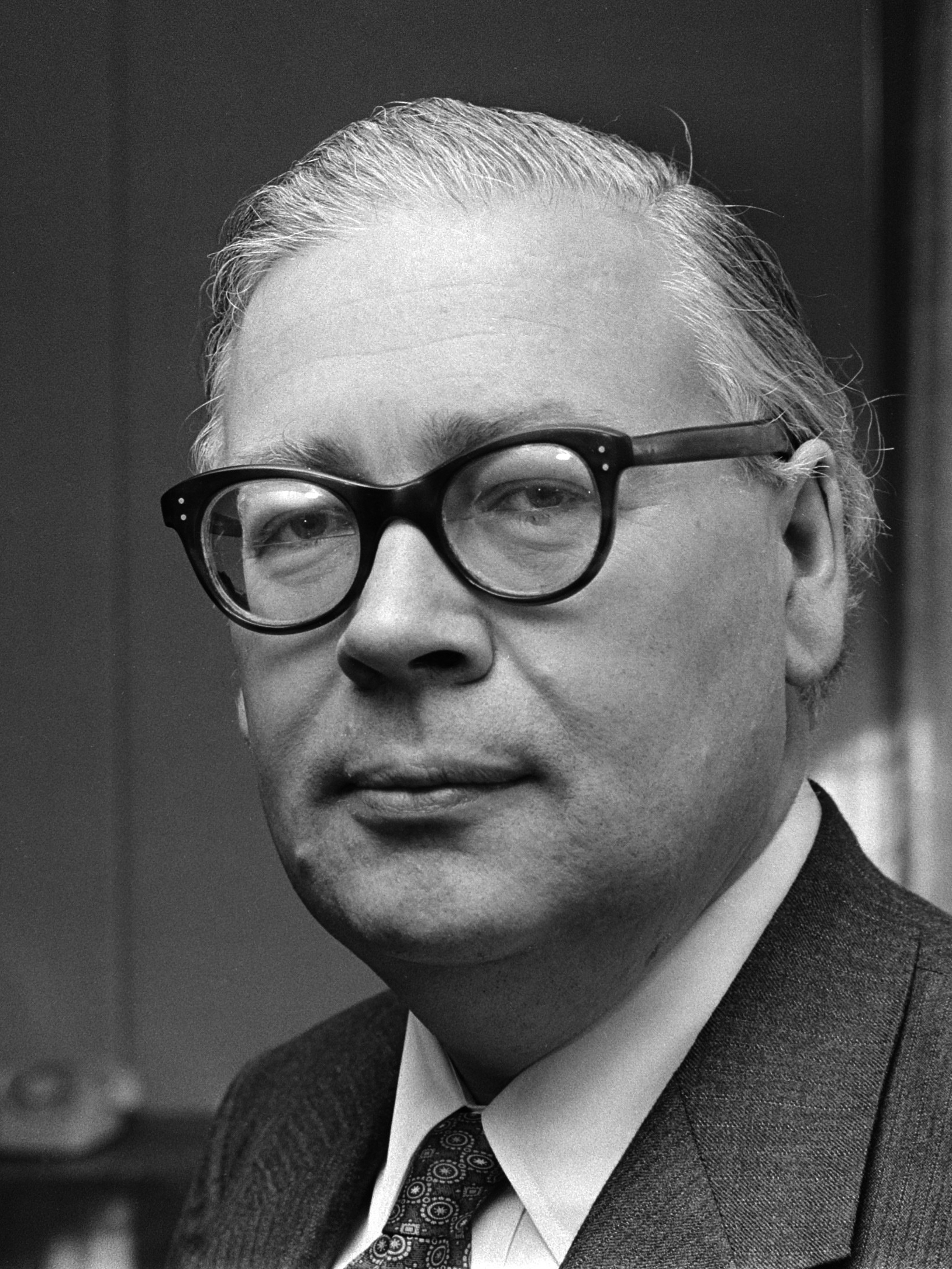
Geoffrey Rippon

- 1 January
  - Graham Kersey, cricketer (born 1971); died in a car crash
  - Joan Rice, actress (born 1930)
- 5 January – V. C. Wynne-Edwards, zoologist (born 1906)
- 7 January
  - Patricia McLaughlin, Northern Irish politician (born 1916)
  - Christopher Mayhew, politician (born 1915)
- 8 January – Sir James Fraser, 2nd Baronet, Scottish surgeon (born 1924)
- 10 January
  - Elspeth Huxley, author, journalist, broadcaster and government advisor (born 1907)
  - Alexander R. Todd, Baron Todd, Scottish biochemist (born 1907)
- 11 January
  - Rosalind Hill, historian (born 1908)
  - Jill Summers, music hall performer and comic actress (born 1910)
- 16 January
  - Iain Mills, politician (born 1940)
  - Martin Redmond, politician (born 1937)
  - Willie Yeadon, railway historian (born 1907)
- 18 January – Myfanwy Piper, art critic, opera librettist, and wife of John Piper (born 1911)
- 19 January – Richard E. Jennings, comic book artist (born 1921)
- 20 January
  - Dennis Main Wilson, broadcast producer (born 1924)
  - Edith Haisman, Titanic survivor (born 1896)
- 21 January – John Glyn-Jones, actor (born 1908)
- 22 January
  - Billy Mackenzie, Scottish singer-songwriter (born 1957); suicide
  - Wally Whyton, musician and television personality (born 1929)
- 23 January – David Waller, actor (born 1920)
- 27 January
  - Cecil Arthur Lewis, author and last surviving air ace of World War I (born 1898)
  - David Townsend, English cricketer (bonr 1912)
- 28 January – Geoffrey Rippon, Baron Rippon of Hexham, politician (born 1924)
- 30 January
  - Henry Bentinck, 11th Earl of Portland, peer (born 1919)
  - Nicholas Mallett, television director (born 1945)
- 31 January
  - Raymond Coxon, artist (born 1896)
  - Hans Tisdall, artist (born 1910, German Empire)

=== February ===
- 2 February – Godfrey Baseley, radio executive, creator of The Archers (born 1904)
- 7 February – John Baker, musician and composer (born 1937)
- 9 February
  - Brian Connolly, Scottish singer-songwriter (born 1945)
  - Barry Evans, actor (born 1943)
- 12 February
  - Nora Beloff, journalist and political writer (born 1919)
  - James Cossins, actor (born 1923)
- 16 February – Jack Wilson, rower (born 1914)
- 17 February – Kenny Graham, jazz saxophonist and composer (born 1924)
- 18 February – Eric Fenby, pianist, organist, conductor, composer and music teacher, aide to Frederick Delius (born 1906)
- 21 February – Kenneth Rowntree, artist (born 1915)
- 23 February – Frank Launder, film director and producer (born 1906)
- 24 February
  - Wolfgang Heinrich Johannes Fuchs, mathematician (born 1915, German Empire)
  - Ernest C. Pollard, professor of physics and astrophysics (born 1908)
- 25 February
  - Scott Forbes, actor and screenwriter (born 1920)
  - Arthur Hewlett, actor (born 1907)
- 27 February – William Gear, Scottish painter (born 1915)

=== March ===
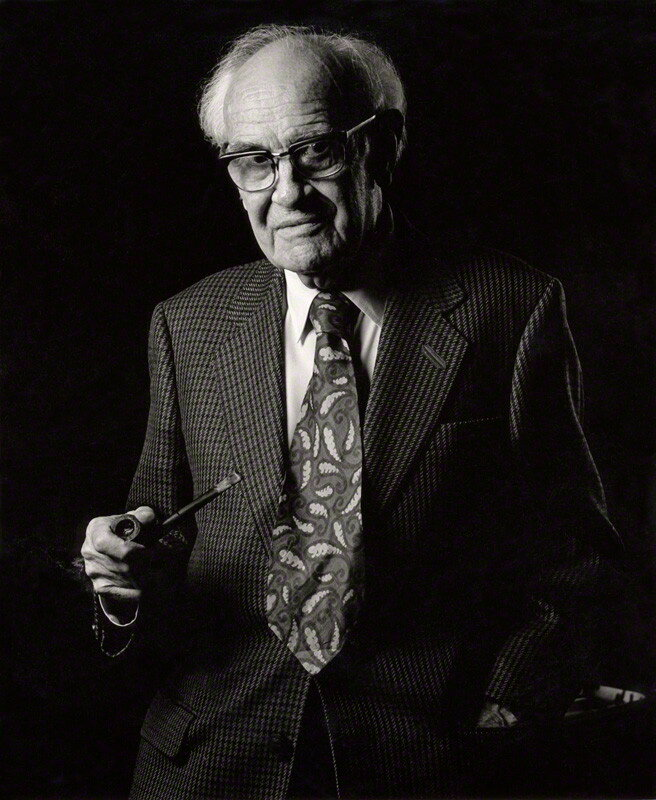
V. S. Pritchett

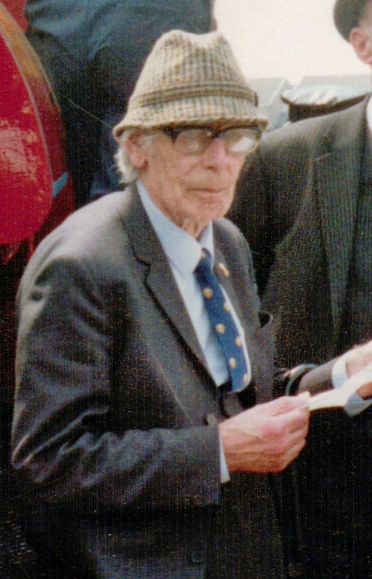
Reverend W. Awdry

- 2 March
  - Douglas Blackwood, publisher and World War II pilot (born 1909)
  - Sir Horace Cutler, politician, Leader of the Greater London Council (1977–1981) (born 1912)
- 3 March – Eric Edwards, Baron Chelmer, solicitor (born 1914)
- 4 March – Joe Baker-Cresswell, Royal Navy officer and aide-de-camp to King George VI (born 1901)
- 6 March
  - Rosalyn Boulter, actress (born 1917)
  - Ursula Torday, novelist (born 1912)
- 9 March
  - Terry Nation, Welsh screenwriter (born 1930)
  - Dame Veronica Wedgwood, historian (born 1910)
- 11 March – Robert Browning, Byzantine historian (born 1914)
- 12 March – William Hare, 5th Earl of Listowel, peer and politician (born 1906)
- 13 March – Ronald Fraser, actor (born 1930)
- 16 March – John Montague Stow, colonial official (born 1911)
- 18 March – Erik de Mauny, journalist and author (born 1920)
- 20 March – V. S. Pritchett, writer and literary critic (born 1900)
- 21 March – Rev. W. V. Awdry, children's writer (born 1911)
- 25 March – C. J. F. Williams, philosopher (born 1930)
- 27 March – George Malcolm Brown, geologist (born 1925)
- 29 March
  - George William Gregory Bird, physician (born 1916)
  - Norman Pirie, biochemist (born 1907)
  - Ellen Pollock, actress (born 1902)

=== April ===
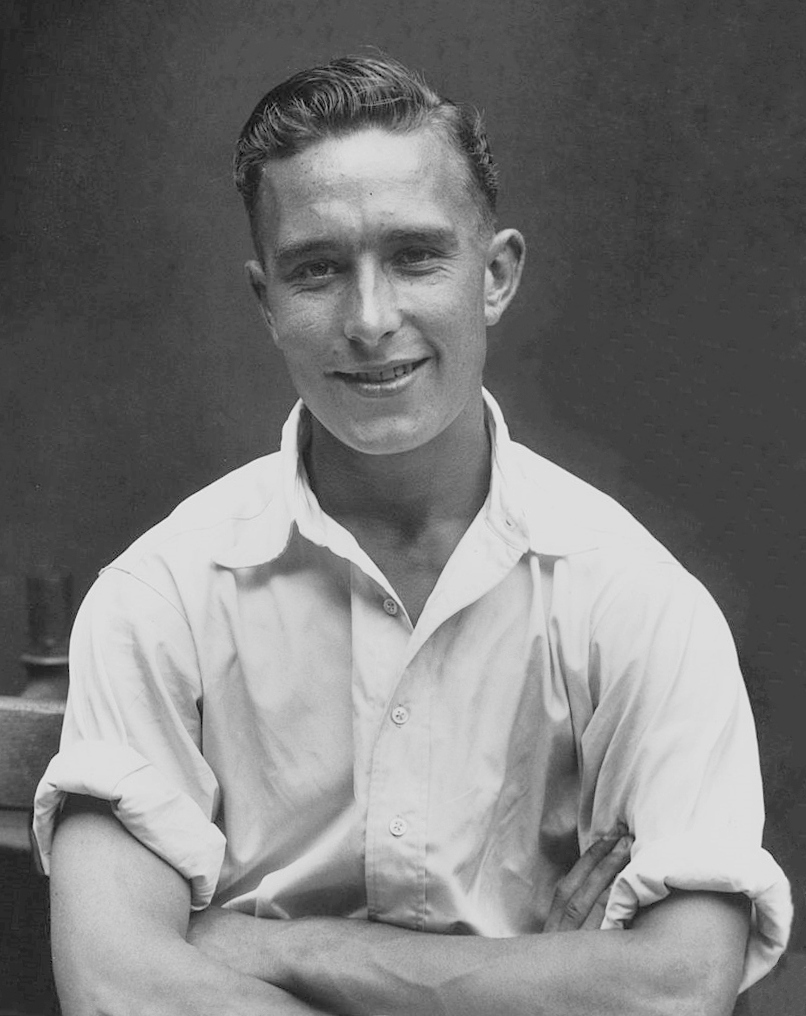
Denis Compton

- 1 April – Norman Carr, English environmentalist and author (born 1912)
- 2 April – Reg Lewis, English footballer (born 1920)
- 4 April – Mike Raven, radio disc jockey, writer and sculptor (born 1924)
- 5 April – Richard Clifton-Dey, artist (born 1930)
- 6 April – David Keith-Lucas, aeronautical engineer (born 1911)
- 9 April – Sir Geoffrey Hardy-Roberts, Army officer, politician and courtier (born 1907)
- 10 April
  - Alan Gibson, journalist, writer and broadcaster (born 1923)
  - Glanville Williams, Welsh legal scholar (born 1911)
- 12 April – James Ross, Scottish surgeon (born 1911)
- 18 April – Edward Barker, cartoonist (born 1950)
- 22 April – Reg Gammon, English painter and illustrator (born 1894)
- 23 April
  - Denis Compton, footballer and cricketer (born 1918)
  - Nancy Seear, Baroness Seear, English politician (born 1913)
- 25 April – Dudley Pope, author (born 1925)
- 27 April
  - Bunny Roger, couturier and socialite (born 1911)
  - Peter Winch, philosopher (born 1926)
- 28 April – Peter Taylor, Baron Taylor of Gosforth, lawyer and judge, Lord Chief Justice of England (1992–1996) (born 1930)
- 29 April – Isabel Graham Bryce, public servant (born 1902)

=== May ===
- 3 May
  - Hughie Green, radio and television presenter and actor (born 1920)
  - Sir John Junor, journalist (born 1919)
- 5 May – George Burns, Army officer (born 1911)
- 6 May – John Edwards Hill, mammologist (born 1928)
- 8 May
  - Pat Hughes, tennis player (born 1902)
  - Michael Shersby, politician (born 1933)
- 11 May – Genine Graham, actress (born 1926)
- 13 May – Laurie Lee, poet and author (born 1914)
- 17 May – Chris Julian, motorcycle racer (born 1937); gyrocopter accident
- 20 May – Don Parker, racing driver (born 1908)
- 23 May – Alison Adburgham, fashion journalist and author (born 1912)
- 25 May – Syd Bidwell, Labour politician (born 1917)

=== June ===
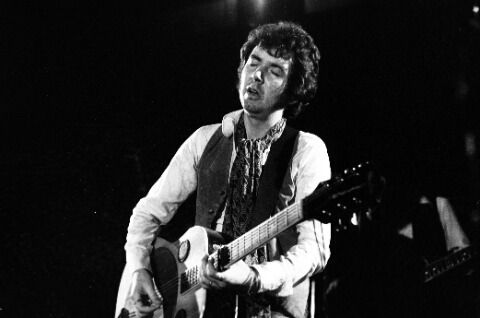
Ronnie Lane

- 2 June – Eddie Thomas, Welsh boxer (born 1925)
- 4 June – Ronnie Lane, musician and songwriter (born 1946)
- 6 June – Richard Neilson, diplomat (born 1937)
- 7 June – Paul Reade, composer (born 1943)
- 14 June – Helena Sanders, cultural activist, politician and poet (born 1911)
- 15 June
  - Nicholas Danby, organist (born 1935)
  - George Denholm, World War II air ace (born 1908)
- 19 June – Julia Smith, television producer (born 1927)
- 22 June – Don Henderson, actor (born 1931)
- 24 June – Leonard B. Strang, professor of paediatric sciences (born 1925)
- 26 June – Charlie Chester, radio and television presenter, comedian and writer (born 1914)
- 27 June
  - W. O. G. Lofts, researcher and author (born 1923)
  - Harrison Marks, glamour photographer (born 1926)
- 28 June – Hubert Lamb, climatologist (born 1913)
- 29 June – Marjorie Linklater, Scottish arts and environment campaigner (born 1909)
- 30 June – Dame Sylvia Crowe, landscape architect (born 1901)

=== July ===
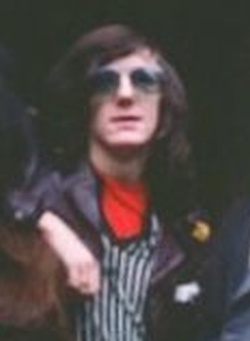
Frank Farrell

- 4 July
  - William Cadogan, 7th Earl Cadogan, peer and soldier (born 1914)
  - Bevis Reid, Olympic athlete (born 1919)
  - John Zachary Young, biologist (born 1907)
- 7 July – Royston Tickner, English actor (born 1922)
- 9 July – Sir David Pitblado, Private Secretary to the Prime Minister (1951–1956) (born 1912)
- 10 July – Ivor Allchurch, former footballer (born 1929)
- 11 July
  - Felix Barker, drama critic and historian (born 1917)
  - Alfred Mellows, rower (born 1922)
- 15 July
  - Alan J. Charig, palaeontologist (born 1927)
  - Rosamund Greenwood, actress (born 1907)
- 16 July – Ron Berry, Welsh novelist (born 1920)
- 17 July – Arthur Jepson, English cricketer and footballer (born 1915)
- 18 July – Sir James Goldsmith, financier and politician, founder of the Referendum Party (born 1933)
- 19 July – Frank Farrell, rock bassist (born 1947)
- 22 July
  - Vincent Hanna, Northern Irish journalist (born 1939)
  - Kevin Howley, football referee (born 1924)
- 24 July
  - Brian Glover, actor (born 1934)
  - Bill Shine, actor (born 1911)
- 25 July – Peter Carmichael, fighter pilot (born 1923)
- 27 July – Isabel Dean, actress (born 1918)
- 28 July – Rosalie Crutchley, actress (born 1920)
- 29 July – Jack Archer, former sprinter (born 1921)

=== August ===
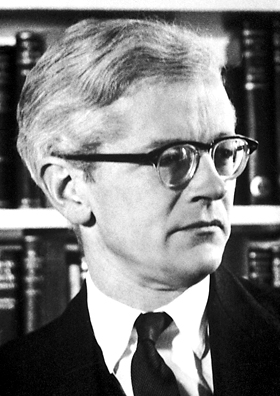
John Kendrew

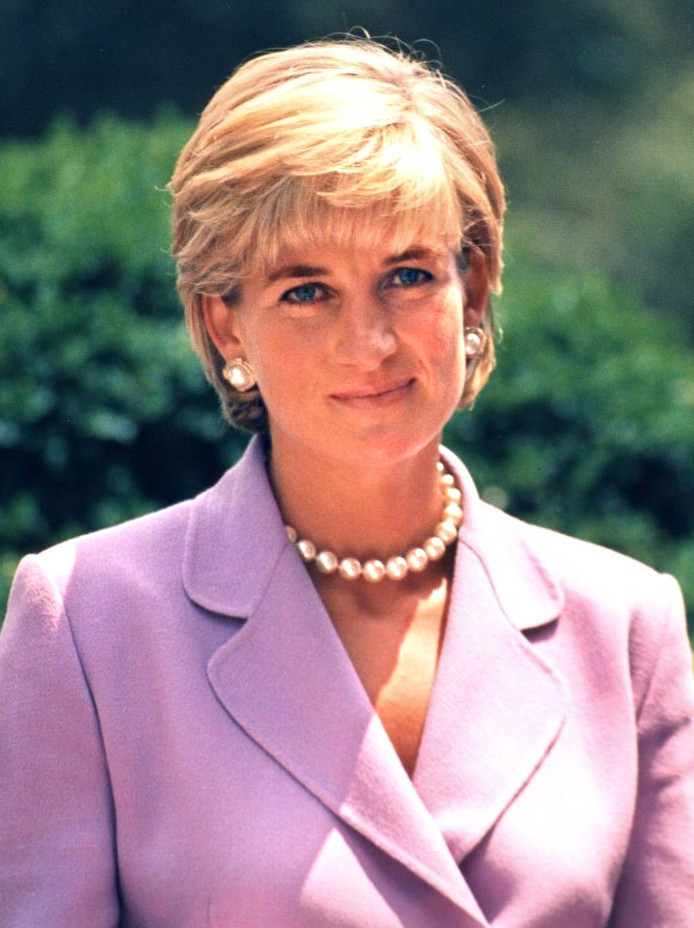
Diana, Princess of Wales

- 2 August
  - John Churcher, Army major-general (born 1905)
  - Rhydwen Williams, novelist, poet and Baptist minister (born 1916)
- 4 August
  - Dick Bush, cinematographer (born 1931)
  - Tom Eckersley, poster artist and design teacher (born 1914)
  - Alexander Young, Scottish musician (born 1938)
- 13 August
  - Marjorie Lynette Sigley, artist, writer, actress, choreographer and theatre director (born 1928)
  - Carel Weight, English painter (born 1908)
- 14 August
  - John Elliot, author, screenwriter and television producer (born 1918)
  - Charlie Fleming, Scottish footballer (born 1927)
- 18 August – Don Knight, actor (born 1933)
- 19 August – Robson Lowe, philatelist and stamp dealer (born 1905)
- 21 August – William Jopling, leprologist (born 1911, Italy)
- 22 August – Robin Skelton, academic, writer, poet and anthologist (born 1925)
- 23 August – John Kendrew, molecular biologist, recipient of the Nobel Prize in Chemistry (born 1917)
- 24 August – Louis Essen, physicist (born 1908)
- 31 August
  - Dodi Fayed, Egyptian film producer and heir to Harrods department store (born 1955); died in Paris car crash
  - Diana, Princess of Wales (born 1961); died in hospital after being seriously injured in the same crash

=== September ===
- 4 September
  - Jeffrey Bernard, journalist (born 1932)
  - Belle Stewart, Scottish singer (born 1906)
- 6 September – P. H. Newby, novelist (born 1918)
- 7 September – Edwin Brock, poet (born 1927)
- 8 September – Derek Taylor, journalist and record producer (born 1932)
- 9 September – Rowland George, Olympic rower (born 1905)
- 12 September – Leonard Maguire, actor (born 1924)
- 14 September – Andrew Fountaine, far-right activist (born 1918)
- 16 September
  - Terence Cooper, actor (born 1933)
  - Gerry Turpin, cinematographer (born 1925)
- 17 September – Brian Hall, actor (born 1937)
- 19 September – Jack May, actor (born 1922)
- 21 September – Maurice Kaufmann, actor (born 1927)
- 22 September
  - Ruth Picardie, journalist and editor (born 1964)
  - George Thomas, 1st Viscount Tonypandy, politician, Speaker of the House of Commons (1976–1983) (born 1909)
- 25 September – Paul Bernard, television director (born 1929)
- 28 September – David Gill, film historian (born 1928)
- 30 September – Graeme MacDonald, television producer and executive (born 1930)

=== October ===
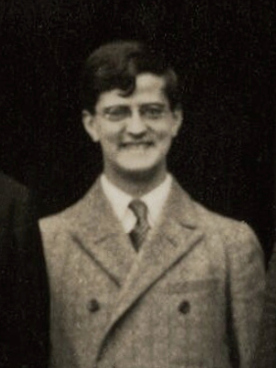
A. L. Rowse

- 3 October – A. L. Rowse, historian (born 1903)
- 4 October – Anne Strachan Robertson, Scottish archaeologist, numismatist and writer (born 1910)
- 5 October
  - Andrew Keir, Scottish actor (born 1926)
  - Debbie Linden, glamour model and actress (born 1961); heroin overdose
- 6 October – Adrienne Hill, actress (born 1937)
- 9 October – Michael Cummings, newspaper cartoonist (born 1919)
- 10 October – George Malcolm, pianist, organist, harpsichordist, composer and conductor (born 1917)
- 13 October
  - Ian Stuart Black, novelist, playwright and screenwriter (born 1915)
  - Richard Mason, British novelist (born 1919)
  - William Staveley, Royal Navy officer (born 1928)
- 14 October
  - George Forrest, classicist and academic (born 1925)
  - Henry Pelling, historian (born 1920)
- 15 October – Macdonald Critchley, neurologist (born 1900)
- 19 October
  - Harold French, actor, film director and screenwriter (born 1897)
  - Arthur Ibbetson, cinematographer (born 1922)
- 20 October – Ron Tarr, actor (born 1936)
- 23 October – Kim Lim, sculptor and printmaker (born 1936, Singapore)
- 24 October – Michael Balfour, actor (born 1918)
- 29 October – Len Beurton, communist and Soviet spy (born 1914)
- 31 October – Wilfrid Oulton, Royal Air Force officer (born 1911)

=== November ===
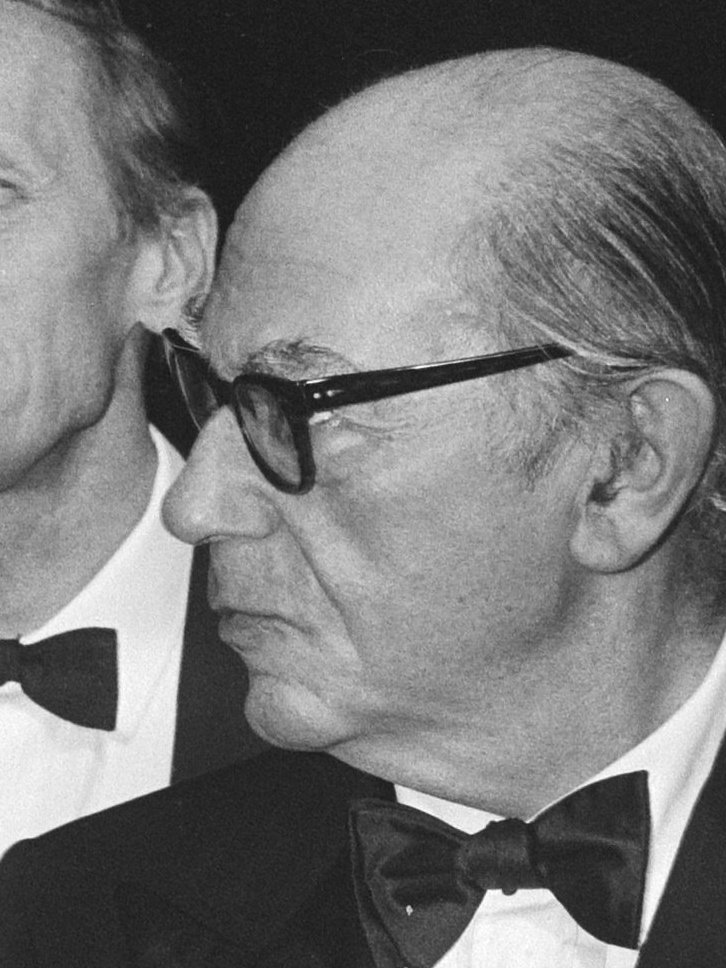
Isaiah Berlin

- 2 November – Harold Plenderleith, Scottish art conservator and archaeologist (born 1898)
- 5 November
  - Sir Isaiah Berlin, philosopher and sociologist (born 1909, Russian Empire)
  - Philip Roberts, Army major-general (born 1906)
- 6 November
  - Annie Llewelyn-Davies, Baroness Llewelyn-Davies of Hastoe, politician (born 1915)
  - Epic Soundtracks, musician (born 1959); drug overdose
- 8 November – Michael Ward, actor (born 1909)
- 9 November – Leonard Matthews, publisher and editor (born 1914)
- 16 November – Roy Sheffield, English cricketer (born 1906)
- 17 November – Wilfred Josephs, composer (born 1927)
- 18 November
  - Jean Conan Doyle, Women's Royal Air Force officer (born 1912)
  - Joyce Wethered, Lady Heathcoat-Amory, golfer (born 1901)
- 19 November
  - Mary Bernheim, biochemist (born 1902)
  - Alfred Roome, film editor (born 1908)
- 21 November
  - Jack Purvis, actor (born 1937)
  - Robert Simpson, composer (born 1921)
- 23 November – Henry Wilson, Baron Wilson of Langside, Scottish lawyer and politician (born 1916)
- 25 November
  - James H. Ellis, engineer and cryptographer (born 1924)
  - Jon Silkin, poet (born 1930)
- 27 November – Eric Laithwaite, electrical engineer (born 1921)
- 30 November
  - Glyn Dearman, actor (born 1939); accident
  - Mary Fergusson, civil engineer (born 1914)

=== December ===
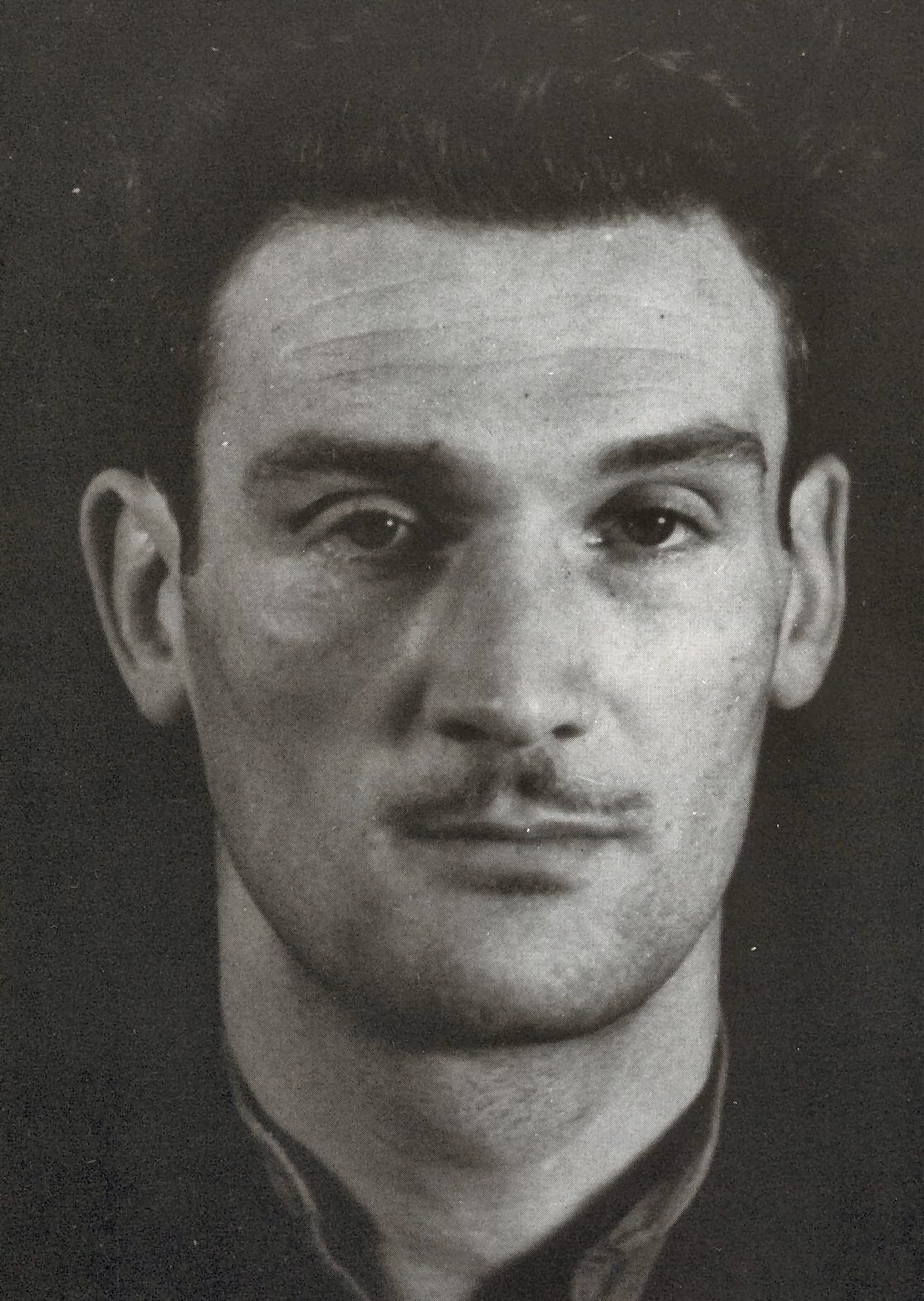
Eddie Chapman

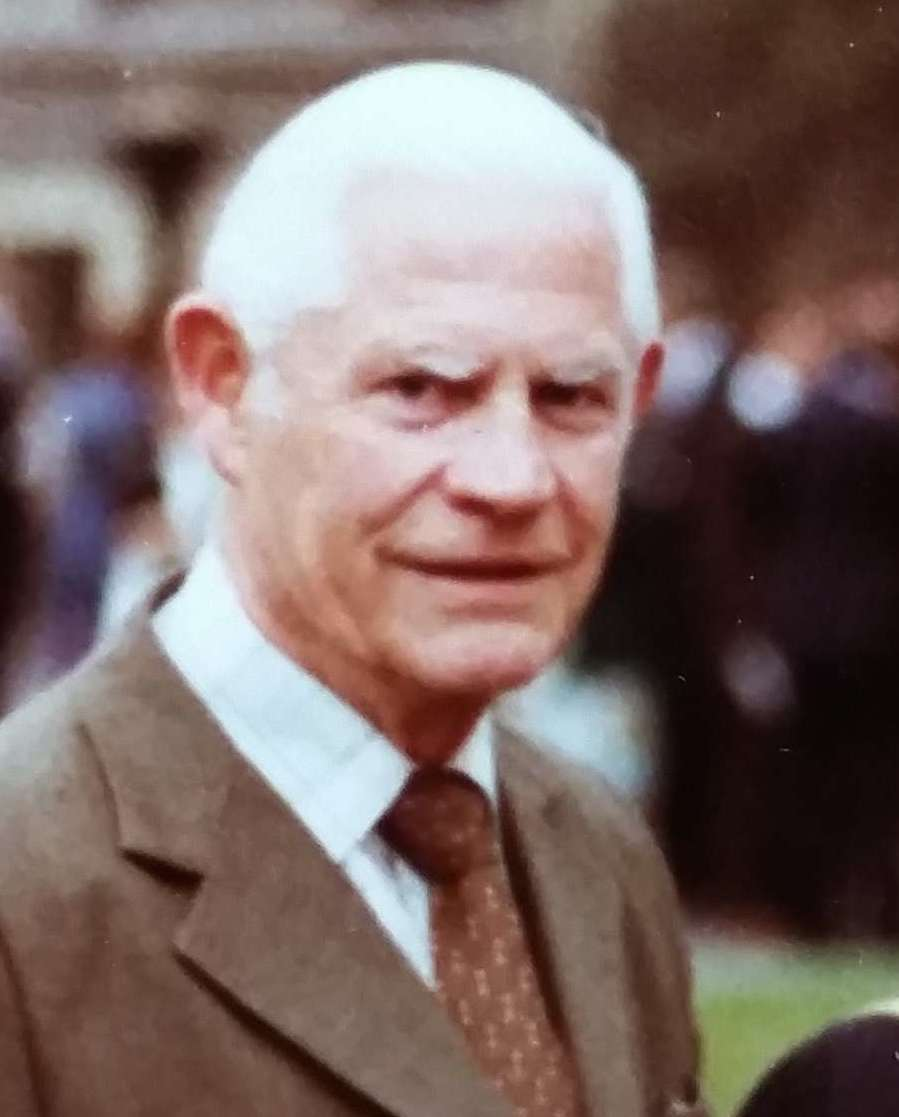
Tommy Price

- 2 December – Shirley Crabtree, "Big Daddy", wrestler (born 1930)
- 4 December – Richard Vernon, actor (born 1925)
- 5 December – Frederick Dainton, Baron Dainton, academic chemist (born 1914)
- 6 December
  - George Chisholm, jazz trombonist (born 1915)
  - Eddie Myers, World War II Army officer (born 1906)
- 7 December
  - Billy Bremner, footballer and football manager (born 1942)
  - Woodrow Wyatt, Baron Wyatt of Weeford, politician, author and journalist (born 1918)
- 8 December – Stephen Tredre, actor and writer (born 1963)
- 11 December
  - Eddie Chapman, World War II spy (born 1914)
  - Simon Jeffes, classical guitarist (born 1949)
- 13 December – Sir Alexander Oppenheim, mathematician (born 1903)
- 14 December
  - Owen Barfield, author, poet, philosopher and critic (born 1898)
  - Gerald Legge, 9th Earl of Dartmouth, peer (born 1924)
- 16 December – Richard Warwick, actor (born 1945)
- 17 December – Peter Taylor, film editor (born 1922)
- 18 December – Geoff Campion, comic book artist (born 1916)
- 20 December – Hugh McMahon, Scottish footballer (born 1906)
- 21 December – Bruce Woodcock, boxer (born 1920)
- 25 December
  - Yvonne Cormeau, World War II spy (born 1909)
  - Kenneth Spring, Army lieutenant-colonel and artist (born 1921)
- 26 December
  - John Hinde, photographer (born 1916)
  - Tommy Price, speedway rider (born 1911)
- 27 December
  - Buxton Orr, composer (born 1924)
  - Billy Wright, Northern Irish loyalist leader (born 1960); murdered in prison
- 28 December – James Lees-Milne, writer and architectural historian (born 1908)
- 29 December – Robert Walter Steel, geographer (born 1915)

== See also ==
- List of British films of 1997
