= Pursuit of Nazi collaborators =

Pursuit of non-German Nazi collaborators after WWII

After World War II, individuals who collaborated with the Nazi regime during the war were pursued and apprehended. This article does not cover former members of the Nazi Party — who were not citizens of the Third Reich at the outbreak of World War II — and their fates after the war.

== Background ==
There were a number of motives for the apprehension of suspected collaborators, including vengeance for Holocaust victims (especially those who were murdered on ethnic grounds such as Jews, Poles, and Russians), bringing criminals to face legal justice (as in the Nuremberg trials), ensuring that the criminality was documented with evidence (with many acts being so unthinkable as to inspire denial), affirming sociocultural intolerance towards genocide (despite the inadequacy of existing laws), and to counter the escapes and resurgence of Nazis (as well as their imitators).

== Means of pursuit ==
The pursuit took many forms, both individual and organised. Several organisations and individuals (famous Nazi hunters) pursued ex-Nazis or Nazi collaborators who allegedly engaged in war crimes or crimes against humanity. Individuals reported seeing someone they recognised, now living under a false identity. Specific individuals were named and sought by groups or governments for their crimes during the war.

Others were subject to postwar spontaneous retaliation in occupied countries, which in some areas led to "witch hunts" for those suspected of having been collaborators, in which vigilantism and summary justice were common. After a first period of spontaneous pursuit, provisional governments took the matter into their own hands and brought suspected criminals to court. The Nuremberg Trial in Germany judged only the highest German Nazi authorities, and each country prosecuted and sentenced their own collaborationists. Pierre Laval in France was judged and sentenced to death, while Philippe Pétain was also sentenced to death, but Charles de Gaulle later commuted that to a life sentence. Governments investigated and interrogated people suspected of collaboration, for example the United States Department of Justice's Office of Special Investigations.

Some Nazis who fled Europe via the ratlines were pursued. However, many suspected war criminals were also given amnesty, and some reached high positions in postwar administrations (e.g. Maurice Papon, who became Police Prefect of Paris in charge during the Algerian War (1954–62); he was blamed for the 1961 Paris massacre). Others were never even tried, such as Robert de Foy who resumed his position as head of the Belgian State Security Service 1945–1958.

== Pursuit in specific countries ==
=== Argentina ===
In March 1998, Ustasha Dinko Šakić, the former commandant of Jasenovac concentration camp (nicknamed the "Auschwitz of the Balkans"), was interviewed on national television in Argentina, where he had lived for over 50 years. During the interview, he admitted to his leadership position, but denied killing anyone. The interview caused a public uproar. In May 1998, Šakić was arrested by Argentine police. The following month, he was extradited to Croatia. In 1999, a Zagreb court sentenced him to 20 years in prison for his crimes. Šakić died in prison in 2008.

=== Australia ===
Latvia applied to Australia to extradite Konrāds Kalējs, allegedly a senior officer in the pro-Nazi Arajs Commando, but he died on 8 November 2001 before he could be extradited. Kalējs migrated to Australia in 1950 and took citizenship.

Hungary applied for the extradition of Charles Zentai from Australia. He was accused of the murder of Peter Balazs, an 18-year-old Jewish man, in Budapest in November 1944, while serving in the Hungarian Army.

In 1987 the Australian government established the Special Investigations Unit (SIU) to investigate suspected Nazi war criminals living in Australia. From the unit's work, charges were made against Ivan Polyukhovich, Heinrich Wagner and Mikolay Berezowsky.

In 1990, Ivan Polyukhovich was charged after SIU investigators (led by Australian archaeologist Richard Wright) uncovered and exhumed a mass grave of over 500 Jewish execution victims in Serniki (Sernyky) Ukraine.

The SIU was actively investigating Australian citizen and suspected war criminal Karlis Ozols when the unit was closed in 1992 after three prosecutions, one trial and no convictions.

=== Belgium ===
Belgium imprisoned Belgian nationals who had collaborated with the Nazis and executed some. One Belgian to be sentenced to execution was Pierre Daye; however, he was one of the first Nazi collaborators to escape Europe, and unusually by plane. He fled to Argentina with the help of Charles Lescat, also collaborator of Je suis partout. Once in Argentina he attended a meeting organised by Juan Perón in the Casa Rosada during which a network (colloquially called ratlines) was created, to organise the escape of collaborators and former Nazis. On 17 June 1947, Belgium requested his extradition from Argentina; however, the Argentine Government ignored this request. Now secure in his freedom, Pierre Daye resumed his writing activities, becoming the editor of an official Perónist review.

Henri de Man was one of the leading Belgian socialist theoreticians of his period, who collaborated with Nazi Germany during World War II. After the liberation of Belgium, he crossed the border to Switzerland. He was convicted in absentia of treason after the war. He died on 20 June 1953, together with his wife, in a collision with a train in Murten, Switzerland.

Albert Luykx fled to the Republic of Ireland in 1948 and became an Irish citizen in 1954.

=== Czechoslovakia ===
Actions against Nazi collaborators in Czechoslovakia, real or alleged, had two significant forms, by judiciary or by mob action. Immediately after the liberation of Czechoslovakia by Soviet and American armies, in an atmosphere of chaos, wild chases began. Individual acts of revenge, mob violence, and simply criminal acts motivated by the possibility to rob or loot targets, occurred. In some places were conducted, by organised groups of self-styled partisans, violence which resembled what is today known as ethnic cleansing. In most places this stopped when the provisional Czech government and local authorities took power. Other forms included legal action, undertaken by the state administration, after the war, until the regular Czech parliament was established. President Beneš ruled by issuing decrees, which were later ratified by parliament.

By decree 5/1945, property of untrustworthy persons was put under national administration. Untrustworthy were considered German and Hungarian nationals, and people who were active in destruction of the Czechoslovak state and its democratic government, supported Nazi occupation by any means, or were members of organisations considered fascist or collaborator. By the same decree, property of people of German and Hungarian nationality, who could prove they were anti-Nazi, could be returned to them.

By decree 12/1945 Sb., farm property of German and Hungarian nationals or citizens was confiscated, unless they could prove active resistance against Nazism. Property of traitors, and enemies of the republic was confiscated, regardless of nationality or citizenship. By decree 16/1945 Sb., special tribunals were started. These people's courts had right to sentence to long term imprisonment, life sentence or death. Prosecutions varied from verbal support to those who had committed crimes against humanity, no prosecution was based on ethnicity. By 33/1945 Sb. people of German and Hungarian nationality or ethnicity lost their Czechoslovak citizenship. However, they had right to apply for renewal.

Most problematic was the law 115/1946, concerning resistance to the Nazi regime, which shifted limit of immunity to the year 1946, effectively amnestying all crimes, acts of individual revenge and atrocities against Germans and Hungarians long after the war.

People who lost Czechoslovak citizenship and failed to apply or did not get it were transferred to Germany, many through the transfer camp established at Terezín, near the Theresienstadt concentration camp.

=== Estonia ===
In the Estonian war crimes trials of 1961 and 1962, several collaborators were sentenced for participation in the Estonian Holocaust. Many of the accused escaped punishment by escaping into exile or by suicide. The infamous Karl Linnas, who had been sentenced to death in absentia, was finally deported by the US in 1987, and died in a prison hospital shortly after.

=== France ===
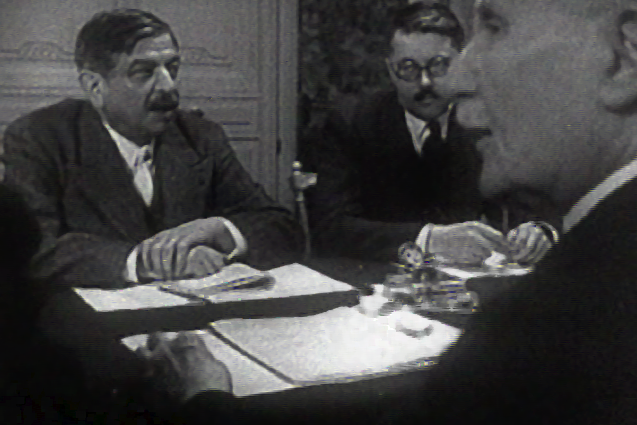
Pierre Laval and Pétain in the Frank Capra documentary film Divide and Conquer (1943)

After the liberation, France was briefly swept by a wave of executions of suspected collaborators. At least some of the women suspected of having romantic liaisons with Germans were publicly humiliated by having their heads shaved. Those who had engaged in the black market were also stigmatised as "war profiteers" (profiteurs de guerre). However, the Provisional Government of the French Republic (GPRF, 1944–46) quickly reestablished order and brought collaborators before the courts. Many of the convicted were later granted amnesty under the Fourth Republic (1946–1954), while some prominent civil servants, such as Maurice Papon, escaped prosecution altogether and succeeded in holding important positions even under Charles de Gaulle and the Fifth Republic (1958 and afterward).

Between 1944 and 1951, official courts in France sentenced 6,763 people to death (3,910 in absentia) for treason and other offences, and 791 executions were actually carried out. More common was "national degradation," a loss of face and civil rights, which was meted out to 49,723 people.

Philippe Pétain, the former head of Vichy France, was charged with treason in July 1945. He was convicted and sentenced to death by firing squad, but Charles de Gaulle commuted the sentence to life imprisonment. Pierre Laval was however, executed after his trial. Most convicted people were given amnesty a few years later. In the police, collaborators often resumed official responsibilities. For example, Maurice Papon, who would be convicted in the 1990s for his role in the Vichy collaborationist government, was in the position of giving orders for the Paris massacre of 1961 as the head of the Parisian police.

The French members of the Waffen-SS Charlemagne Division who survived the war were regarded as traitors. Some of the more prominent officers were executed, while the rank-and-file were given prison terms; some of them were given the option of serving time in Indochina (1946–54) with the Foreign Legion instead of prison.

Many war criminals were judged only in the 1980s, including Paul Touvier, Klaus Barbie, Maurice Papon and his deputy Jean Leguay. The last two were both convicted for their roles in the July 1942 Rafle du Vel' d'Hiv, or Vel' d'Hiv Roundup. Famous Nazi hunters Serge and Beate Klarsfeld spent decades trying to bring them to justice. Former police chief René Bousquet, who had overseen the Vel' d'Hiv roundup, was indicted for his role in 1991 but was assassinated before his trial. A fair number of collaborationists joined the OAS terrorist movement during the Algerian War (1954–62). Others such as Abel Bonnard and Louis Darquier de Pellepoix fled to Francoist Spain where they were granted political asylum. Jacques de Bernonville escaped to Quebec, then Brazil. Jacques Ploncard d'Assac became a counselor of Salazar in Portugal.

Reliable statistics of the death toll do not exist. At the low end, one estimate is that approximately 10,500 were executed, before and after liberation. "The courts of Justice pronounced about 6,760 death sentences, 3,910 in absentia and 2,853 in the presence of the accused. Of these 2,853, 73 percent were commuted by de Gaulle, and 767 carried out. In addition, about 770 executions were ordered by the military tribunals. Thus the total number of people executed before and after the Liberation was approximately 10,500, including those killed in the épuration sauvage", notably including members and leaders of the milices. US forces put the number of "summary executions" following liberation at 80,000. The French Minister of the Interior at the time, March 1945, reported that the number executed was 105,000. Modern scholarship estimates a total number of summary executions between 10,000 and 15,000.

=== Greece ===
Greece was under the control of the Third Reich from 1941 to 1944. After the liberation, the country followed a controversial period of denazification. Many collaborators and especially former leaders of the Nazi-held puppet regime in Athens were sentenced to death. General Georgios Tsolakoglou, the first collaborationist prime minister, was tried by the Greek Special Collaborators Court in 1945 and sentenced to death, but his penalty, like most death sentences, was commuted to life imprisonment. The second collaborationist leader, Konstantinos Logothetopoulos, who had fled to Germany after the Wehrmacht's withdrawal, was caught by the US military and was condemned to life imprisonment. In 1951, he was given parole and thus died outside prison. Ioannis Rallis, the third collaborationist prime minister, was tried on a treason charge; the court sentenced him to life imprisonment. However, several lower and middle figures that had collaborated with the Germans, especially members of the Security Battalions and the gendarmerie, were soon released and reinstated in their posts; in the developing Greek Civil War, their anti-Communist credentials were more important than their collaboration. Indeed, in many cases the same people who had collaborated with the Germans and staffed the post-war security establishment persecuted leftist former Resistance members.

Furthermore, during 1945, a Special Court on Collaborators in Ioannina condemned, in absentia, 1,930 Cham collaborators of the Axis to death (decision no. 344/1945). The next year the same court condemned an additional 179. However, the war crimes remained unpunished since the criminals had already fled abroad.

=== Israel ===
Israel enacted the Nazis and Nazi Collaborators (Punishment) Law on 1 August 1950. Between 1950 and 1961, this law was used to prosecute around 40 Jewish Kapos proven to have been Nazi collaborators. In 1988, John Demjanjuk was sentenced to death as well, but the guilty verdict was later overturned by the Supreme Court on 29 July 1993.

On 23 February 1965, Latvian aviator and Nazi collaborator Herberts Cukurs was assassinated by the Mossad, the Israeli foreign intelligence service, after being lured to Uruguay under the pretense of starting an aviation business.

=== Norway ===
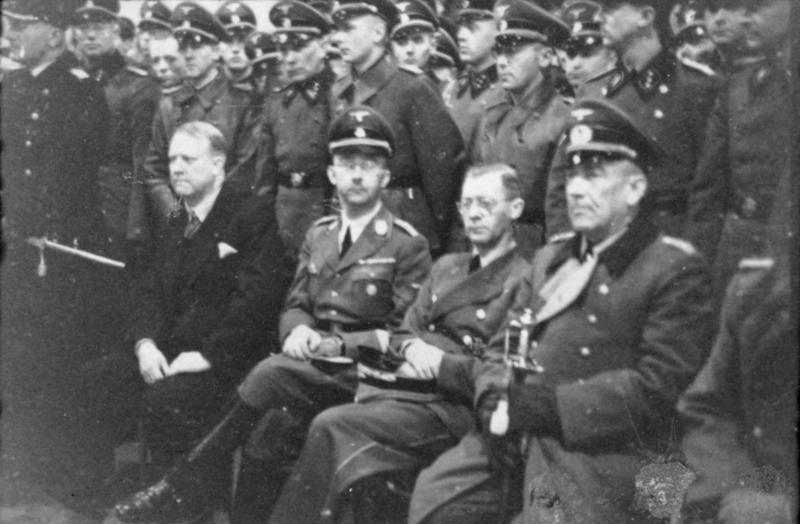
Heinrich Himmler visited Norway in 1941. Seated (from left to right) are Quisling, Himmler, Terboven, and General Nikolaus von Falkenhorst, the commander of the German forces in Norway.

Vidkun Quisling, the war time Norwegian "Minister President", and, among others, Nasjonal Samling leaders Albert Viljam Hagelin and Ragnar Skancke, were convicted and executed by firing squad. A total of 45 people were sentenced to death and 37 were executed (25 Norwegians and 12 Germans). Both at the time and later these sentences were the subject of some debate, since the decision to reintroduce capital punishment to the Norwegian legal system for the post war trials was based on clauses in military law. Capital punishment in the Criminal Code had been abolished in 1904. The decision was made by the exiled Norwegian government in London in 1944, later to be debated three times in the Parliament during the trials, and to be confirmed by the Supreme Court.

=== Poland ===
In occupied Poland the status of Volksdeutsche had many privileges but one big disadvantage: Volksdeutsche were conscripted into the German Army. The Volksliste had 4 categories. No. 1 and No. 2 were considered ethnic Germans, while No. 3 and No. 4 were ethnic Poles that signed the Volksliste. No. 1 and No. 2 in the Polish areas re-annexed by Germany numbered ~1,000,000 and No. 3 and No. 4 ~1,700,000. In the General Government there were ~120,000 Volksdeutsche.

After the war, Volksdeutsche of Polish origins were treated by Poles with special contempt, and also considered traitors according to Polish law. German citizens that remained on territory of Poland became as a group personae non gratae. They had a choice of applying for Polish citizenship or being expelled to Germany. The property that belonged to Germans, German companies and German states, was confiscated by the Polish state along with many other properties in Communist Poland.

German owners, as explicitly stated by the law, were not eligible for any compensation. Those who decided to apply became subject to a verification process. At the beginning of the process, many acts of violence against Volksdeutsche took place. However, soon the verification of Volksdeutsche became controlled by the juridical process and was completed in a more controlled manner.

=== Soviet Union ===
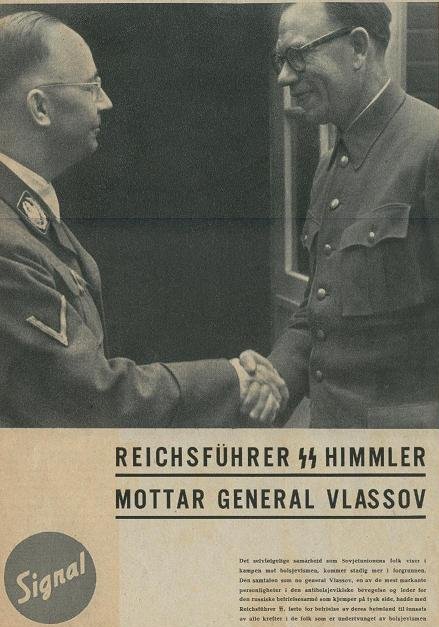
Andrey Vlasov and Himmler

The Soviet pursuit of collaborators began before the war was even over, as the government was eager to deter further collaboration. At the Krasnodar Trial in 1943, eight Soviet citizens were condemned to death and three others to imprisonment for their collaboration with the Einsatzgruppen. People who had been supportive of the occupation were killed by the Red Army during the German withdrawal. Russian and other Soviet members of the Russian Liberation Army and the Committee for the Liberation of the Peoples of Russia, such as Andrey Vlasov, were pursued, tried, and were either sent to Gulag prison camps or executed. Several collaborators were prosecuted and imprisoned repeatedly, as Soviet law did not contain double jeopardy protections and allowed them to be retried under the same charges.

Many Soviet prisoners of war were seen to have collaborated with the Nazis, even if they had done no more than been captured by the Wehrmacht, and spent the war in a camp. Many such unfortunate Soviet citizens were persecuted upon their repatriation to the Soviet Union. Additionally, citizens were prosecuted for helping the Germans to reconstruct areas which had been destroyed by the Red Army. In general, after a short trial, if they were not executed, Nazi collaborators were imprisoned in Gulag forced labour camps.

The Volga German Autonomous Soviet Socialist Republic was abolished and Volga Germans were banished from their settlements on the Volga River with many being deported to Kazakhstan or Siberia.

It is estimated that between 1943 and 1953, around one third of arrests made by the NKVD were of Soviet citizens accused of collaboration. According to historian Tanja Penter, the number of Soviet citizens prosecuted for crimes committed during the occupation far surpassed the total number of Germans prosecuted anywhere in Europe.

=== United Kingdom ===
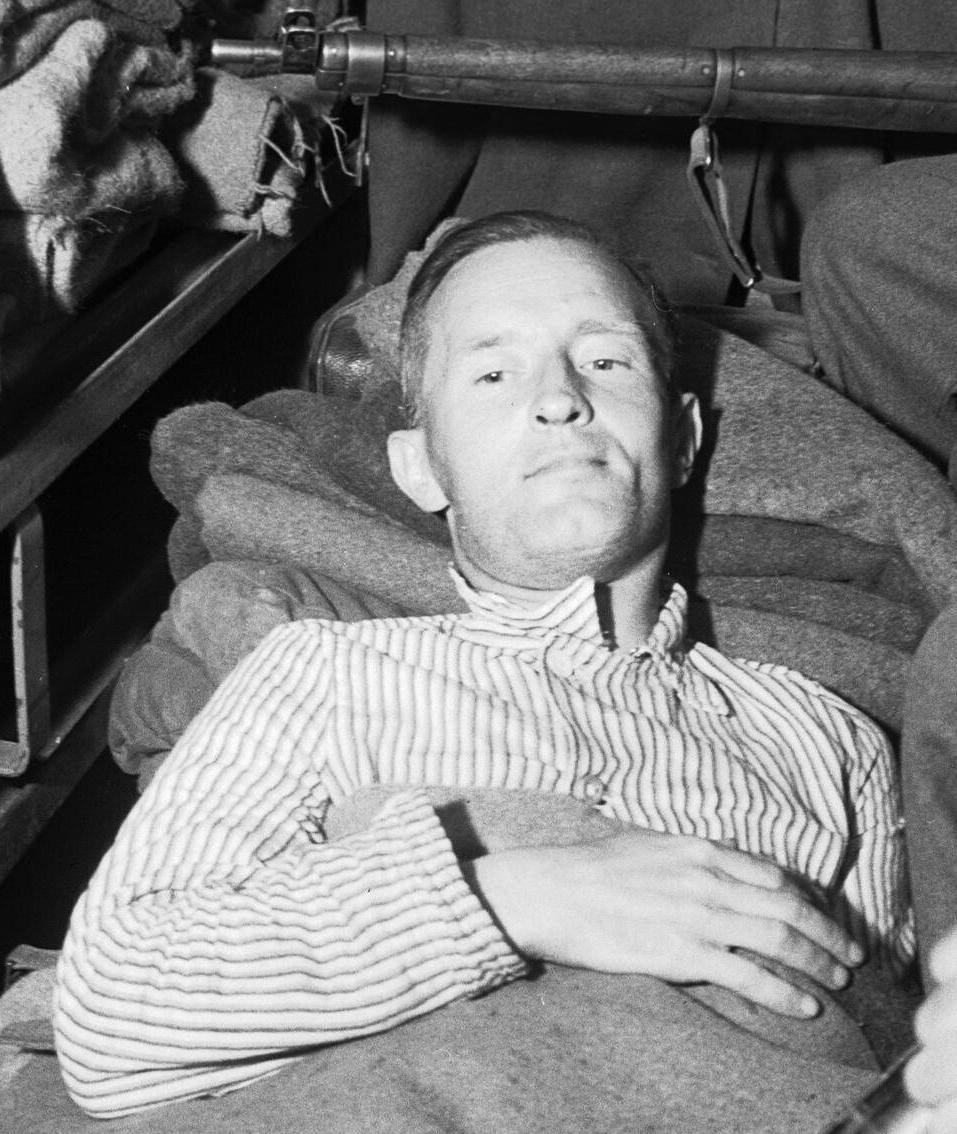
William Joyce, who was "Lord Haw-Haw" to British wartime listeners, now silenced and under arrest, lies in an ambulance under armed guard before being taken from British Second Army headquarters to a hospital.

At the end of the war a number of individuals were tried by the British government for high treason. These included members of the Waffen-SS British Free Corps and William Joyce, better known as Lord Haw-Haw. However, the government refused to prosecute many leading fascists such as John Beckett and Archibald Maule Ramsay, in spite of evidence that they had worked with the Nazis. As agreed at the Yalta Conference, the British handed back many Soviet citizens to the Soviet authorities for trial. Some of these were collaborators who had served in the pro-Nazi Russian Liberation Army. A controversy would emerge years later, as some of those handed over were White Russians and Cossacks who had never been Soviet citizens, and who were subsequently murdered by the Soviet authorities. Yugoslav collaborators were handed over to Josip Broz Tito's forces in the Bleiburg repatriations, with many being imprisoned while some killed as a result.

Viktors Arājs, who was the leader of the eponymous commando unit which helped the Nazis murder the Jews of Latvia and Belarus, had been captured in the British zone of occupied Germany after the war, and was released in 1949 after spending several years in a prisoner-of-war camp, the British being ignorant to his true identity. He remained at large until 1979 when the West German government put him on trial. One of Arajs's deputies, Harijs Svikeris, settled in Britain after the war and in the 1990s was thought to be a strong candidate to be prosecuted under the War Crimes Act, but he died before being prosecuted.

In 1961 Ain-Ervin Mere was put on trial in the Soviet Union for his role in the murder of 5,000 foreign Jews in Estonia, but the request for extradition was refused by the British government, claiming that the Soviet government had insufficient evidence. In 1997 an attempt by British authorities to prosecute Soviet collaborator Szymon Serafinowicz collapsed after he was ruled unfit to stand trial. On 1 April 1999, Anthony Sawoniuk was sentenced to life in prison after being found guilty of murdering 18 Jews in Britain's first Nazi war crimes trial. Sawoniuk had led "search-and-kill" police squads to hunt down Jews trying to escape after nearly 3,000 were massacred at Domachevo in Nazi-occupied Belarus during September 1942. He died in prison on 7 November 2005 at the age of 84.

=== Yugoslavia ===
The reprisals for collaboration with the Nazis were particularly harsh in Yugoslavia, because collaborators were also on the losing side of a de facto civil war fought on the Yugoslav territory during the war. The Communists executed many Ustashe, as well as their collaborators, particularly in the Bleiburg death marches.

After the war, the UDBA, Yugoslavia's secret police, was sent overseas to find and eliminate several former Ustashe who fled the country, including the leader of the Ustashe and their pro-Nazi government, Ante Pavelić. They conducted a successful assassination of Vjekoslav Luburić and others, and the extradition of Zdenko Blažeković, Andrija Artuković, and others.

== See also ==
- Collaboration with the Axis Powers during World War II
- Denazification
- Deschênes Commission
- Expulsion of Germans after World War II
- Repatriation of Cossacks after World War II

== Bibliography ==
- Martin Mauthner. Otto Abetz and His Paris Acolytes: French Writers Who Flirted with Fascism, 1930–1945. (Sussex Academic Press, 2016). ISBN 978-1-84519-784-1
