= Sernyky massacre =

Sernyky Massacre
- Location: Sernyky, Rivne Oblast, Ukraine; 51°49′52.3″N 26°13′31.7″E
- Date: August - September 1941
- Perpetrators: Nazi Germany
- Victims: 533

The Sernyky (Serniki) massacre refers to the killing of 553 Polish/Soviet citizens, most of whom were Jewish, near the village of Serniki (now Sernyky, Ukraine) by Nazi German forces between August and September 1942.

== Massacre ==
Of the 553 people identified, 401 were executed with a bullet to the head. The majority of the victims were female (405), with 148 males including 96 children under the age of 10.

== Discovery ==
In 1989, Professor Richard Wright from the Australian Special Investigation Unit led a preliminary investigation into the grave site that was revealed while investigating suspected Nazi collaborator Ivan Polyukhovich. After further investigation of the site by local authorities detected human remains, a full exhumation with support of Soviet soldiers excavated the mass grave led by the archaeologists, forensic scientists and police scientific experts from the Australian Special Investigations Unit.

Ivan Polyukhovich was charged on 25 January 1990 under the Australian War Crimes Act but was acquitted in 1993.

== Memorial ==
Citizens of Sernyky erected a monument on the site of the mass grave in 1992.

== See also ==
- The Holocaust in Ukraine
- Pursuit of Nazi collaborators
