= Jacques de Bernonville =

French collaborator

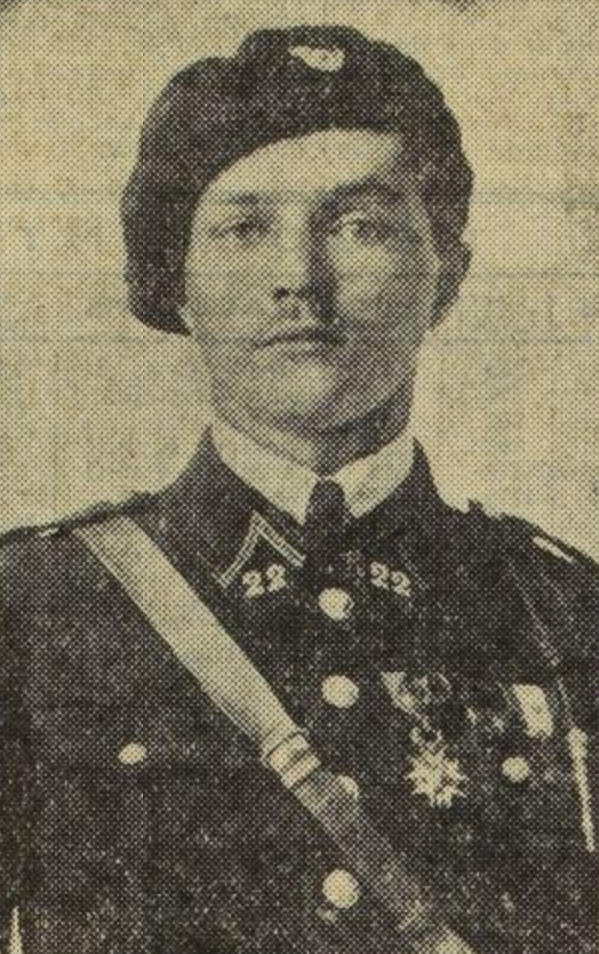
- de Bernonville in 1938
- Born: 20 December 1897; Paris, France
- Died: 26 April 1972 (aged 74); Rio de Janeiro, Brazil
- Cause of death: Murder by asphyxiation
- Organization: Milice
- Political party: Action Française

Count Jacques Charles Noel Dugé de Bernonville (20 December 1897 – 26 April 1972) was a French collaborationist and senior police officer in the Milice of the Vichy regime in France. He was known to hunt down and execute resistance fighters during World War II, as well as for his participation in antisemitic programs, including the deportation of French Jews to Drancy and extermination camps. After his escape from France, he was convicted in absentia of war crimes and sentenced to death.

He was aided in entering Quebec, Canada in 1946 by leading Catholics of the province. In 1948, his true identity was discovered by immigration officials, who instituted deportation proceedings. De Bernonville fled to Rio de Janeiro, Brazil, where he lived for the rest of his life. In 1957, the Supreme Court of Brazil refused to approve an extradition order. He was murdered by asphyxiation in 1972 by his servant's son.

== Early life and education ==
Count Jacques Dugé de Bernonville was born in Paris to an aristocratic family and educated in Jesuit schools. He became aligned with reactionary political groups.

== Career ==
In 1938, he was imprisoned for several months, charged with having taken part in the conspiracy of La Cagoule, a far right terrorist group. He was released because of lack of proof.

Following the 1940 defeat of France against Nazi Germany, Jacques de Bernonville joined the Vichy government. In 1943 he was appointed as a commander of the collaborationist Milice, the Vichy police. Working in conjunction with the head of the Milice Joseph Darnand, de Bernonville hunted down members of the French Resistance. They were almost always summarily executed.

As a right-hand man to Klaus Barbie (later convicted for crimes against humanity), de Bernonville participated in the establishment and enforcement of the Vichy regime's program of antisemitic policies. They carried out the deportation of thousands of French Jews, refugee Jews and other "undesirables" to the Drancy deportation camp en route to Auschwitz and other German extermination camps.

== Post-war escape to Canada ==
After the liberation of France by the Allied Forces and the French Resistance, de Bernonville was charged first, by the Dijon special tribunal, with endangering the safety of the State in 1946 and, second, in 1947, of treason by the Toulouse "cour de justice". Found guilty and condemned to death, he fled the country. It is noteworthy that those tribunals were exceptional jurisdictions set up during the "Epuration" to "purge" all organs of state and civil society of those suspected of, or guilty of collaboration with the German occupiers.

Escaping French authorities in 1946, Count de Bernonville sailed to New York City. According to Kevin Henley, professor of history at Collège de Maisonneuve in Montreal, the politically powerful Roman Catholic priest Lionel Groulx helped Count de Bernonville get into Quebec and established a new identity as Jacques Benoit. He was welcomed by a significant number of the Quebec nationalist elite, but in 1948, Canadian immigration authorities discovered his identity and instituted deportation proceedings. In an attempt to keep Count de Bernonville in Canada, 143 Quebec notables signed a 1950 petition defending him and stating that he should be allowed to stay. Signers included the secretary general of the Université de Montréal; Camillien Houde, mayor of the city of Montreal; plus Camille Laurin and Denis Lazure, two future cabinet ministers in the Parti Québécois government.

Faced with a deportation order, Count de Bernonville fled again, going to Rio de Janeiro, Brazil. In 1954 the French government was advised of his location but, since Brazil had no extradition treaty with France, he escaped punishment. The Supreme Court of Brazil refused to extradite him in October 1957. Count de Bernonville remained in Brazil. He died in 1972, murdered by the son of his servant, who was drunk and high on hashish.

== See also ==
- Collaborationism
- Pursuit of Nazi collaborators
