= Tenants' and Residents' Organisations of England =

Tenants' and Residents' Organisations of England (TAROE) is an officially recognised resident-led organisation representing tenants and residents across England. It was set up in 1997 as a merger of the National Tenants' Organisation (NTO) and the National Tenants' and Residents' Federation (NTRF).

TAROE created Asert as a joint venture with the contractors, Mears, to provide a housing inspection service.
