= Ivan Polyukhovich =

Acquitted Ukrainian-Australian World War II war crimes sespect

Ivan Timofeyevich Polyukhovich (Ukrainian: Іван Тимофійович Полюхович, romanized: Ivan Tymofiyovych Poliukhovych; 1924–1997) was an alleged (and eventually acquitted) Ukrainian-Australian World War II war criminal. He was born at Serniki, Pinsk, nowadays Belarus.

== Background ==
Following Germany's invasion of the Soviet Union in 1941, some Ukrainians chose to collaborate with the Wehrmacht, including Polyukhovich, one of six siblings. He was employed by a forestry department and allegedly participated in the execution of about 850 people from the Jewish ghetto in Serniki in occupied Ukraine and further executions of civilians in the same area between August and September 1942. When the Germans retreated from Ukraine, Polyukhovich and his second wife Maria left with the German troops and later Polyukhovich was given work in Germany. On 28 December 1949, Polyukhovich, his wife Maria, and two step-daughters arrived in Melbourne, Australia. In 1958, they received Australian citizenship.

On 26 December 1986, the Adelaide Advertiser received a telex from the USSR outlining war crimes accusations against Polyukhovich. Limited examinations outside the town of Serniki of 533 selected crania confirmed that 410 of the men, women, and children exhumed had been shot in the head - see the Sernyky massacre. Polyukhovich denied all accusations of wrongdoing.

On 20 December 1988 Australia's federal parliament passed the War Crimes Amendment Bill which allows prosecutions against suspected European criminals in ordinary Australian civilian courts. On 25 January 1990 he was arrested and charged him with 24 counts of murder and complicity in 850 counts of murder.

== Legal battle ==
In July 1990, Polyukhovich was shot and wounded on the eve of his trial. Two passersby found him near his home in stable condition.

On 3 September 1990 the High Court began hearing a challenge to the constitutional validity of the War Crimes Amendment Act itself. The primary question was whether in 1989 there was either an obligation under customary international law or a matter of international concern that war criminals from the pre-1945 years be sought out and tried for their offences. On 14 August 1991 the war crimes legislation was endorsed by the High Court.

According to the High Court, “the Act discharges an international obligation or meets an international concern that persons alleged to be guilty of war crimes and crimes against humanity be sought out, brought to trial and, upon conviction, punished, irrespective of the place where the crime was committed or where the alleged offender is found and irrespective of the citizenship or residence of the alleged offender or the victim.” The court ruled “Australia’s international personality would be incomplete if it were unable to exercise a jurisdiction to try and to punish offenders against the law of nations whose crimes are such that their subjection to universal jurisdiction is conducive to international peace and order.”

== Conclusion ==
On 28 October 1991 the prosecution opened the case against Polyukhovich in the Adelaide Magistrate Court. On 5 June 1992, he was indicted for only six murders, the rest of the charges were dismissed. On 18 May 1993, he was acquitted by a jury of all charges due to purported difficulties in presenting evidence and testimony clearly identifying the accused.
