= Beef Bones Regulations 1997 =

Statutory instrument of the British government limiting the sale of beef on the bone

- Statutory Instrument
- Parliament of the United Kingdom
- Citation: SI 1997/2959

Dates
- Made: 15 December 1997
- Laid before Parliament: 15 December 1997
- Commencement: 16 December 1997
- Revoked: 26 April 2008

Other legislation
- Made under: Food Safety Act 1990
- Revoked by: Transmissible Spongiform Encephalopathies (Wales) (Amendment) Regulations 2008

Status: Revoked

Text of statute as originally enacted

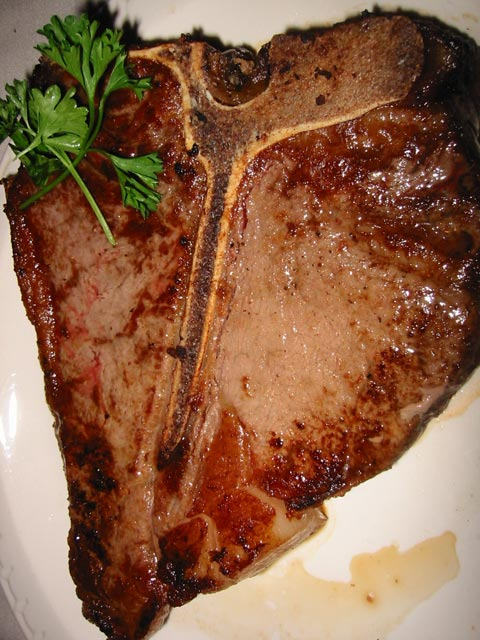
A cooked T-bone steak, illegal to sell under the regulations until 1999

The Beef Bones Regulations 1997 (SI 1997/2959) was a statutory instrument of the British government that limited the sale of beef on the bone. The regulations were implemented as a response to the United Kingdom BSE outbreak (mad cow disease) over fears that variant Creutzfeldt–Jakob disease in humans might be caused by the consumption of dorsal root ganglia, which lie near the bone. As well as beef on the bone, all beef-bone derived products were prohibited from sale. This had the effect of outlawing T-bone steaks, prime ribs and oxtail as well as some soups and stocks. Other aspects of the regulations dealt with the deboning of beef and the keeping of records in the food production industry. The restrictions on sales were lifted in December 1999 and the regulations as a whole were revoked in April 2008.

== Background ==
Reported cases of BSE 1987–2008

The regulations were among 60 issued by the British Ministry of Agriculture, Fisheries and Food before the end of 1997 to combat the outbreak of bovine spongiform encephalopathy (BSE) in cattle. BSE is a neurodegenerative brain disease of cattle, transmissible by the consumption of contaminated brain or spinal tissues. It has been linked to variant Creutzfeldt–Jakob disease (vCJD) in humans. BSE was first detected in the UK in November 1986 and measures were taken from 1988 to restrict contamination in the food chain such as through meat and bone meal (MBM). The European Union banned the use of all mammalian-derived MBM for feeding of ruminants in 1994. From 1996 restrictions on the sale of British beef were put in place by some countries.

== Regulations ==
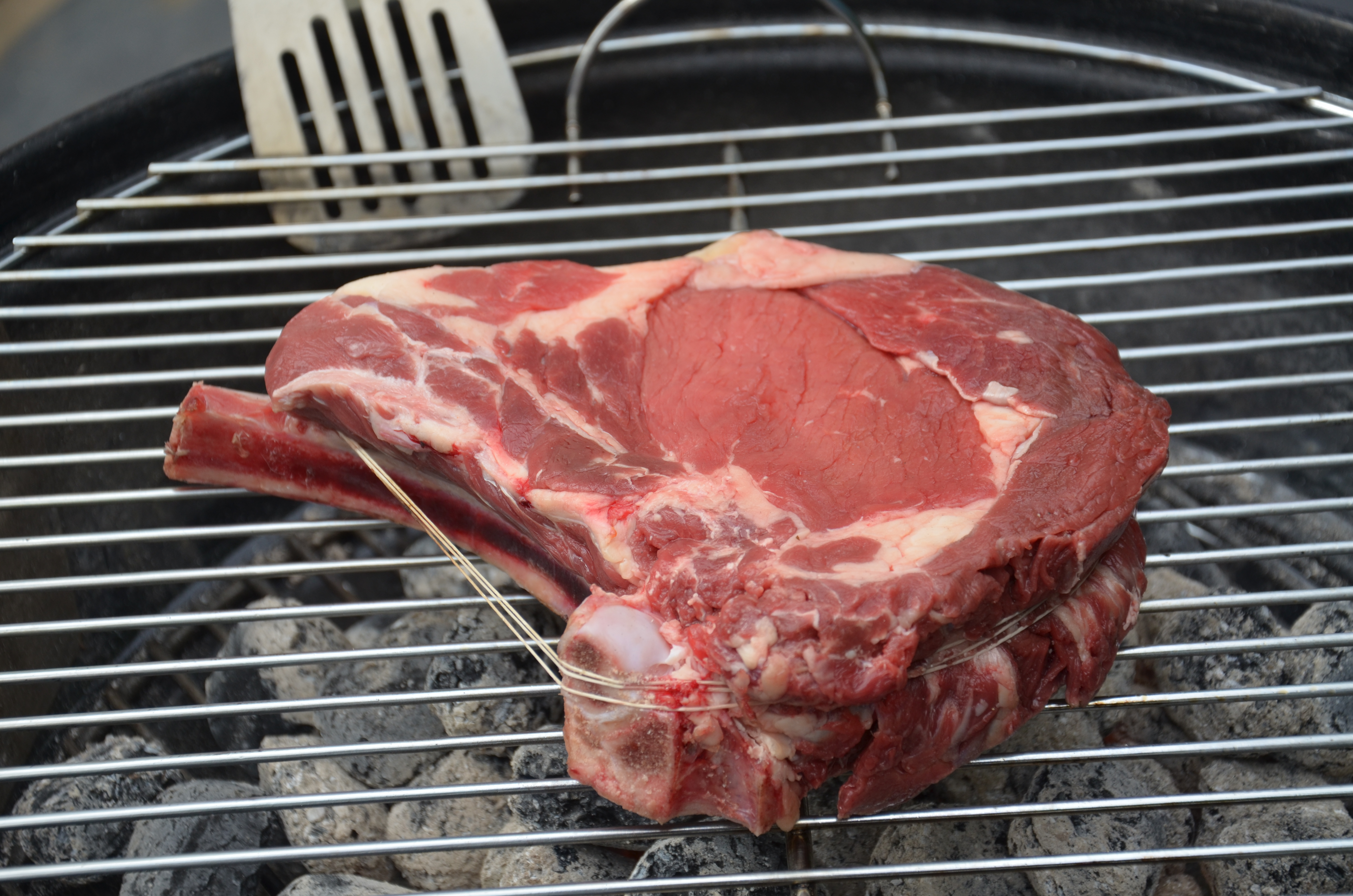
Beef rib on the bone

The stated purpose of the regulations was "to protect public health and maintain confidence in beef and beef products". They were a statutory instrument (SI) made under the powers granted by the Food Safety Act 1990, applied across Great Britain and came into force on 16 December 1997. The Minister of Agriculture, Fisheries and Food at the time the regulations were implemented was Jack Cunningham.

The regulations prohibited the sale of any beef on the bone (from animals aged 6 months or older) and restricted the use of beef bone material in food products for human consumption. They also banned the deboning of beef anywhere except in a recognised food processing premises and created a responsibility for the operator of such premises to ensure that deboning was carried out in such a manner as to prevent contamination of food stuffs. The regulations also specified how beef bones should be stored and required food producers to keep records pertaining to the origin of their beef. The ban on the sale of beef on the bone came into force immediately, and food producers were granted a three-month period to implement the other aspects of the regulations.

The regulations were imposed because of fears that previous practices risked contamination of foodstuffs by dorsal root ganglia, nerve tissue found close to the bone, and mechanically recovered meat. The measures were recommended by England's Chief Medical Officer (CMO), Kenneth Calman. The regulations made illegal the sale of previously accepted foodstuffs such as T-bone steaks, prime ribs and oxtail. The sale of soups and stocks derived from or flavoured by beef bones were also banned. At the time of the ban beef on the bone accounted for 5% of all British beef sales.

There were protests against the ban, which some consumers saw as an over-reaction to the risk of vCJD infection by a paternalistic government, and the National Farmers' Union of England and Wales criticised the measures. A march on Downing Street was held by butchers, consumers and meat industry personnel after which the prime minister Tony Blair was presented with a rib of beef. The regulations were criticised in the tabloid press and the Worshipful Company of Butchers held a six-course dinner to "say goodbye to the roast beef of Olde England" at which diners wore black armbands. The first prosecution under the regulations was rejected by Scottish Sheriff James Paterson at Selkirk's sheriff court on 21 April 1998, but on 26 June 1998, an appeals court instructed Paterson to rule on the case. Prince Charles was illegally served beef on the bone at a Newport hotel in 1999 but the proprietor escaped prosecution.

== Amendment and revocation ==
On 30 November 1999 the Minister of Agriculture, Fisheries and Food Nick Brown announced that the regulations would be relaxed to permit the sale of beef on the bone. Chancellor of the Exchequer Gordon Brown hinted strongly that there would be no prosecutions for sales made between that date and the formal issuing of the amendment to the regulations (which came on 17 December 1999). The relaxation followed a review of the evidence by the medical officers of all four countries of the United Kingdom, which concluded that the risk of transmission had sufficiently declined. The opposition Conservative Party claimed the ban had cost the British beef industry millions of pounds and should never have been imposed. The relaxation was made by separate statutory instruments in England, Wales and Scotland because of the effects of devolution since the original SI's enactment. There was some discussion over whether separate policies should be maintained in the home nations of Great Britain, as the Chief Medical Officers for Scotland and for Wales wanted to retain the restrictions for longer than did their counterpart the CMO for England.

Incidence of BSE continued to decline and the European Union ban on British beef exports was lifted on 1 May 2006. The Beef Bones Regulations 1997 were revoked in April 2008. This led to an increase in the production of desinewed meat, recovered from beef bones, that was sold as mechanically separated meat. The Food Standards Agency banned this production in 2012.
