= Szymon Serafinowicz =

Alleged War Criminal

Semyon Stefanovich Serafimovich (19 December 1910 – 7 August 1997) was the first person to be prosecuted under the War Crimes Act 1991 in the United Kingdom. During World War II he was a commander in the Belarusian Auxiliary Police under Nazi occupation.

Serafimowich, a Belarusian who was a carpenter by trade, was granted refugee status when the War ended and migrated to the UK with his wife, who died in 1993. British authorities initially investigated Serafimowich in 1947 and found that he had entered the United Kingdom illegally by falsely stating that he had been a member of the Polish army during the war, but no action was taken against him.

In 1995 Serafimowich was arrested and charged with four counts of murder in respect of Jews in Belarus in 1941/2. Two of the charges related to alleged murders that occurred in the town of Turets on 27 October and 4 November 1941. The other charges related to the alleged killing of a Jew on 9 November 1941 in the town of Mir (where about 3,000 Jews were held in the Mir Ghetto), and another alleged murder some time between December 1941 and March 1942 in the village of Kryniczne, 15 kilometres north of Mir. During the committal hearing that followed, sixteen witnesses testified that Serafimowich played a role in the extermination of more than 3,000 Jews in and around Minsk, the capital of Belarus. According to historian Eugeniusz Mironowicz, Serafimowich and his associates murdered families that they had lived and worked with for years.

The case against Serafimowich was withdrawn when a jury at the Old Bailey formed the view that he was unfit to be tried because of reduced competence resulting from dementia. The outcome subsequently raised questions around the efficacy of criteria used to determine a person's mental competence, as well as the validity of the legislation used to prosecute Serafinowicz.

Serafimowich died soon after the trial ended, on 7 July 1997 at the age of 86, and is buried at All Saints Church, Banstead, Surrey, England.
