= Othen =

Othen is a surname. Notable people with the surname include:

- Annie Othen (born 1956), British journalist and broadcaster
- Geoffrey Othen (1933–2015), British cricketer
- Joel Othen (born 1985), Swedish bandy player

== See also ==
- Otten
