= 104.4 FM =

FM radio frequency

The following radio stations broadcast on FM frequency 104.4 MHz:

== United Arab Emirates ==
- Virgin Radio Dubai

== United Kingdom ==
- BBC Radio Berkshire in Reading, Berkshire and Wokingham
- BBC Hereford and Worcester in Alvechurch, Barnt Green, Bromsgrove, Druids Heath, Frankley, Hopwood, Worcestershire, Maypole, Birmingham, Longbridge, Redditch, Wychavon and Wythall
- BBC Radio Newcastle in Gateshead and Newcastle upon Tyne
- BBC Radio Norfolk in King's Lynn and West Norfolk
- BFBS Gurkha Radio in Holywood, County Down
- CCR 104.4 in Chelmsford
- Pulse in Somerset
- Resonance FM
- West Somerset Radio in Minehead
