= Bay Radio =

Bay Radio can refer to either of the following radio stations:

- Bay Radio, local radio station in South Wales.
- Bay Radio, a national radio station in Malta.
- Bay Radio, a local radio station for the Valencian Community, Spain.
