= Bob Brolly =

Northern Irish broadcaster, singer and entertainer

Bob Brolly MBE
- Born: Robert Joseph Brolly; Derry, Northern Ireland
- Style: Broadcaster, singer, entertainer
- Website: http://www.bobbrolly.co.uk/home.html

Robert Joseph "Bob" Brolly MBE (born 4 October) is a Northern Ireland-born broadcaster, singer and entertainer, and long established personality in the West Midlands region. He presented a long-running programmes on BBC CWR and BBC Radio WM for several years, where he is probably best known for a weekly Irish music show aired on Sunday afternoons. After leaving the BBC in August 2023, Brolly began presenting his Irish music show on BRMB in Birmingham from October.

== Life and career in broadcasting ==
Born in Derry, Brolly moved with his family to England when he was fifteen, and settled in Coventry. After training as an engineer, he worked in the automotive industry for several years, at Morris Motors, before holding a number of other jobs that included being chief beer taster for Bass Brewery. His radio career has seen him present a long-running afternoon programme on BBC Coventry & Warwickshire, which aired for twelve years until 2013, as well as his Irish music show, which was first broadcast in the mid-1990s. In 2015, he also became the host of Brolly and Friends, a chat show airing on Irish TV, a channel aimed at the Irish diaspora.

On 27 August 2023, Brolly presented what turned out to be his final Sunday afternoon show for BBC Local Radio in the West Midlands. During the programme he voiced his anger at being asked to "audition" to continue presenting with the BBC. Within days he was informed by bosses that he had been taken off air. He was subsequently contacted by Birmingham-based BRMB, which had recently been relaunched, with a job offer and made his debut on the station on Sunday 1 October presenting Bob Brolly's Irish Show on Sunday afternoons.

== Music career ==
Brolly first began singing as a boy, as a member of the Waterside Chapel choir in Derry, but did not become a professional musician until much later in life, and when his family entered the pub trade. With his band, Calvary (in which he was both lead singer and drummer), Brolly embarked on tours of Europe, the United States and Australia. He has also enjoyed a successful solo career, appearing at venues including the Wembley Arena in London, and the National Indoor Arena and Symphony Hall in Birmingham. He has released several albums, many featuring covers of popular songs. His 2012 album, Till We Meet Again is a collection of mostly original material.

== Philanthropy ==
In 1994, and along with fellow broadcaster Stuart Linnell and the Coventry Telegraph, Brolly founded the Snowball charity to raise funds for good causes. This was followed in 1998 by the first Bob Brolly and Friends annual fundraising campaign. Brolly hosted his first charity fundraising ball in 1999, in aid of the Omagh Victim Support Fund and Leukemia Research, and featuring Irish artists and personalities such as Brendan Shine, Foster and Allen, Barry McGuigan and Majella O'Donnell. Brolly was awarded the MBE in the 2003 New Year Honours for his services to charity and broadcasting. He is also a past winner of the Irish World Radio Presenter of the Year Award, and the Irish Post Media Person of the Year Award.

In November 2005 Brolly was rushed to hospital after suffering a heart attack. At the time he described the experience as like being "hit in the chest with a baseball bat". He subsequently gave his backing to the Derek Higgs Start a Heart Appeal, an appeal named in honour of former Coventry City F.C. director Derek Higgs (who died from a heart attack in 2008), and which sought to raise funds for fifty defibrillators that would be placed at locations around Coventry. He is also a patron for the Zoe's Place Baby Hospice in Coventry.

== Discography ==
- Dreams, Hopes and Promises (2001)
- Precious Years (2002)
- Songs From Me To You (2003)
- The Irish Way (2004)
- Bob Brolly Loves To Sing (2005)
- Brolly (2006)
- Endless Magic (2010)
- Till We Meet Again (2012)
