= Jon Gaunt =

British journalist (born 1961)

- Born: Jonathan Charles Gaunt; 3 March 1961 (age 65); Coventry, England
- Presenting career
- Country: England
- Previous shows: Sun Talk; Talksport; BBC London; BBC Radio WM; BBC Three Counties Radio; BBC CWR
- Website: www.jongaunt.co.uk

Jonathan Charles Gaunt (born 3 March 1961) is an English radio talk show presenter, TV personality, newspaper columnist, social commentator and spokesman.

Gaunt describes himself as a "working-class, educated guy with, in broad strokes, a rightwing agenda". He has appeared as a newspaper reviewer on Sky News Sunrise and as a contributor to television programmes such as Question Time, Countdown, Daily Politics and BBC News. On radio, Gaunt was a regular contributor on BBC Radio 2's The Jeremy Vine Show.

== Play and script writer ==
He studied Drama and Theatre Arts at the University of Birmingham. On graduation he founded a theatre co-operative in Coventry called Tic Toc, and wrote over 15 political plays. The company eventually received funding from West Midlands Arts and the Arts Council of Britain. It was also funded by the company becoming a major promoter at the Edinburgh Festival Fringe, promoting and hosting acts such as Julian Clary, Harry Enfield and Mike Myers.

His most successful play was Hooligans which won a Fringe First at the 1986 Edinburgh Festival Fringe. It also won the Perrier Pick of The Fringe. This play was subsequently adapted by Yorkshire Television, and Gaunt began writing for television, becoming a member of the Emmerdale script writing team for two years.

== Radio presenter ==
Gaunt had a chance meeting with Moz Dee, who later became the programme director at Talksport, led to his being persuaded to audition for the local radio station for which Dee worked, BBC Coventry & Warwickshire.

Gaunt has worked for many radio stations, including BBC Three Counties Radio, BBC Radio WM, BBC London 94.9, BBC Coventry & Warwickshire and Talksport. Gaunt's BBC Three Counties show was awarded three Sony Radio Academy Gold Award in 2001.

Gaunt hosted a mid-morning current affairs show on Talksport. On 18 November 2008 it was announced that Talksport had terminated Gaunt's contract following an interview with Redbridge Council's Michael Stark on 7 November, in which Gaunt branded Councillor Stark a "health Nazi", and "an ignorant pig" live on air in a discussion about whether smokers should be allowed to foster children in care. Gaunt felt that the policy was draconian and would leave children in care, where he believed that they would be in much more danger. He had criticised Redbridge Council in similar terms in his Sun newspaper column that morning. Ofcom later found Talksport in "breach of broadcasting rules" as a result of the incident and Jon Gaunt's appeal failed. "The broadcast was undoubtedly highly offensive to Mr Stark and was well capable of offending the broadcast audience."

In January 2009 Gaunt stated his intent to fight the human rights case for the sake of "all broadcasters", before turning his attention to suing Talksport for terminating his contract. In January 2010 he won the right to appeal against Ofcom on the grounds that it had breached his right to freedom of expression. The case returned to the High Court of Justice on 15–16 June 2010, but on 13 July it was announced that Gaunt had lost his case, the judge upholding Ofcom's decision and concluding that "the offensive and abusive nature of the broadcast was gratuitous, having no factual content or justification". Human rights group Liberty intervened in the case because of its "wider importance to free speech", but Gaunt's decision to appeal the judge's ruling was dismissed in the Court of Appeal in June 2011.

From April 2009 to July 2010, Gaunt presented an online radio talk show for the Sun's website, called Sun Talk. The show was also broadcast on regular FM radio in Spain, on the Costa Blanca via Bay Radio and Costa Del Sol via Spectrum FM. The three-hour talkshow was broadcast every weekday from 10 am to 1 pm GMT.

In March 2010, Sun Talk won a British Press Award for Digital Innovation, and Gaunt was nominated for a Sony Radio Award for Speech Radio Personality of the year. In May that year, SunTalk announced that it would be expanding its output for the 2010 World Cup.

In July 2010 SunTalk was closed down by News International, as part of a cost review strategy to focus on core operations.

In March 2013 Gaunt joined the UK Independence Party. The announcement was made at the party's spring conference in the Devon city of Exeter.

In 2014 Gaunt joined FUBAR Internet radio.

In 2015 he launched a radio station called Talk2meradio but the station closed down in 2018.

In 2018 he joined Radio Sputnik Worldwide and presented a show called Shooting from the Lip.
