= The Man with the Flower in His Mouth =

1922 play by Luigi Pirandello

The Man With the Flower in His Mouth (Italian: L'Uomo dal Fiore in Bocca [ˈlwɔːmo dal ˈfjoːre im ˈbokka]) is a 1922 play by the Italian playwright Luigi Pirandello. It is particularly noteworthy for becoming, in 1930, the first piece of television drama to be produced in Britain, when a version was screened by the British Broadcasting Corporation as part of their experimental transmissions.

== Plot ==
The play is a one-act "dialogue" derived, with small variations, from the novella La Morte Adosso (1923). The "flower" (il fiore in bocca) is cancer. The dialogue takes place in a bar, late at night, between a man who is dying of an epithelioma and a peaceful businessman who has missed his train. In other words, between someone who intensely lives the little time left to him and someone who is rich with time to spend idly and irresponsibly, waiting for the morning train and entirely absorbed by the banal contretemps.

The exceptional nature of the moment, for the man who feels death upon him—to use Pirandello's phrase—and the normality of it, for the one who is absorbed in the usual affairs of life with its small daily commitments, mark the two ends of the dialectic which is animated in the grand soliloquy of the protagonist.

He lucidly analyses his last sensations on earth, evoking scenes of common life, particulars of a quotidianity which are receding from him irremediably and which, for this reason, make precious the memories of even the most trivial events. In the solemnity of his solitude, he seems to have gained unexpected awarenesses of the life that is leaving him and of death. With no sense of regret or repentance, he almost seems to bitterly enjoy his unrepeatable experience marked by the echo of the end, which allows him to dedicate himself with interest to observing the anonymous life of others, in order to grasp its sense.

== Adaptations ==
=== 1930 television version ===
The BBC had been experimenting with John Logie Baird's primitive 30-line television technology since the previous year, running test transmissions both from Baird's own premises and from their own radio headquarters at Savoy Hill. In the summer of 1930 it was decided that a drama should be produced as a new test for and demonstration of the medium, and The Man With the Flower in His Mouth was selected for use because of its short length of around half an hour, its limited cast of only three characters and its confined setting.

The production was broadcast live on the afternoon of 14 July, from a set at the Baird company's headquarters, 133 Long Acre in London. The production starred Earle Grey as 'The Man', Gladys Young as 'The Woman' and Lionel Millard as 'The Customer'. It was directed by the BBC's head of radio drama at the time, Val Gielgud, and produced by Lance Sieveking. The artwork was by C. R. Nevinson.

Generally regarded as a successful experiment, the production was watched at the time by Ramsay MacDonald, the Prime Minister, with his family from their official residence at 10 Downing Street. Baird had installed one of his prototype 'televisors' here two months previously, so that MacDonald could view the test transmissions he and the BBC were regularly broadcasting.

=== 1967 re-creation ===
As the 1930 production was transmitted live, no record survives of it in the archives. However, in 1967, Bill Elliott, a technician working at Granada Television in Manchester, decided to attempt a re-creation of an extract of the play, using a replica of one of the 30-line Baird Televisiors he had constructed himself, which acted as both camera and monitor.

The 30-line signal was sufficiently low-band for Elliott to be able to record the production onto a stereo audio tape recorder, thus preserving it for posterity. Although Elliott did not re-create the entire play and used amateur student actors in the roles, he did secure the services of the original production's producer, Lance Sieveking. Sieveking not only returned to produce the production in an attempt to assure as much authenticity as possible, but he was also able to provide the original artwork used in the play which was used again, and the same 78-rpm gramophone record which had provided the music in 1930, which was also re-used.

The 1967 production survives in Elliott's hands, and a small segment was seen in the 1985 Granada documentary series Television, a history of the medium.

=== 2007 opera ===
In February 2007 an opera based on the play was premiered in De Munt in Brussels. The composer was Luc Brewaeys.

== See also ==
- Timeline of the BBC
