= Malcolm Boyden =

British DJ

- Born: 5 August 1964 (age 61); Bromsgrove

Malcolm George Boyden (born 5 August 1964) is a double Sony Award-winning BBC local radio presenter, who formerly presented the Mid-morning show as well as a Sunday show on BBC Hereford and Worcester. He won a Sony gold award in 1997 for 'Radio Personality of the Year', and followed that up in 2001 when he took a bronze award in the 'Broadcaster of the Year' category.

== Early career ==
Boyden began his career as a newspaper journalist for the Redditch Indicator. He then went on to work as a sports sub-editor on the Daily Star and then sports editor of the Birmingham Daily News. He is a regular at the Hawthorns to watch his beloved West Bromwich Albion.

== Broadcasting career ==
He first started broadcasting on Beacon Radio in Wolverhampton as a commentator on West Bromwich Albion games.

He then started broadcasting on BBC Radio WM in the summer of 1993 presenting the Sunday Lunchtime show. In addition to that, in May 1994 he also took over Saturday Breakfast and later in 1994 was promoted to the Weekday Mid-Morning show from 10 am to 12 midday, taking over from Gordon Astley.

He then went on to present the lunchtime show from noon to 2 pm and then the afternoon show from 1 to 4 pm until he was axed from the station in March 2004.

== BBC Hereford & Worcester ==
After six months in the wilderness, freelancing on various commercial stations around the Birmingham area, in October 2004, Boyden was poached by BBC Hereford and Worcester to present their Tuesday evening sports show from 7 to 9 pm.

In addition to that, in May 2005 he also took over a Sunday morning show on the station from 9 am to midday. He now presents the mid-morning show (weekdays 10am – 1pm) with regular contributions from the listeners, including "Lord Taylor", "Russ the cobbler","Gaz Le Bass", "Double Denim Dave" and "Tip-off Tim" to name but a few.

== BBC CWR ==
Malcolm presented the Drive Time slot on BBC CWR for some time, from Monday to Thursday between 5 pm and 7 pm, as well as his Saturday Breakfast show between 9 am and noon.

In addition to his regular stints on BBC Hereford and Worcester, in late 2005, Boyden also took over Saturday Breakfast on BBC CWR. He went on to take over Saturday mornings and his last show was on Saturday 2 March 2013.

== Back to Birmingham ==
In the summer of 2006, Boyden made a brief return to BBC Radio WM, where he took over the evening show, from Daz Hale who had taken over the Breakfast show during the summer of that year.

He remained on the show until the Autumn of 2006 as Daz Hale returned to the slot upon the arrival of Phil Upton on the stations Breakfast show. Boyden covered for various presenters on the station since then.

This was in addition to his weekend shows on BBC CWR & BBC Hereford and Worcester, although he did quit his Tuesday evening show on BBC Hereford & Worcester to take over the shows on BBC Radio WM.

== BBC Oxford ==
Boyden joined BBC Oxford in April 2008 initially as cover for other presenters, beginning his regular slot as the weekday breakfast presenter (7 am – 10 am) in the autumn of the same year.

As an experienced sports journalist Boyden gained considerable support for his 'I Believe' campaign during the 2008–09 season and made a personal appearance at the U's ground to hand out car stickers to fans.

Boyden presented the 10 am to 1 pm show. His last show on BBC Oxford was on Friday 31 October 2014.

== Current work ==
Malcolm swapped the Breakfast show for the 10 am – 1 pm show on 95. 2FM. Boyden was heard on the radio every weekend across Hereford and Worcester, presenting a Sunday mid-morning Show from 9 am to noon. In October 2023, Boyden stepped down from BBC Hereford and Worcester, citing changes to the BBC local radio as his reasoning.

He lives in Bromsgrove with his wife Maxine and their two sons Elliott and Oliver.

Malcolm is an ardent West Bromwich Albion supporter (often referred to as Boing, Boing Boyden) and also follows Oxford United due to his work with the local radio station.

Malcolm Boyden is currently the presenter of "The Bench Warmers" local sporting programme, which is broadcast on BBC Hereford & Worcester on Monday and Friday evenings between 18:00 and 19:00.

== Other work ==
Boyden has also published a number of books: his debut novel, Perfect, was published in 2003. Brum's The Word, a book made up of his football columns in The Times following his team West Brom, came out the same year. Boyden's third book, Ferrets, Faggots and Elvis, focussing on the eccentric folk of the West Midlands, was published in 2005. His latest book, The Greatest Podcasting Tips in the World appeared in August 2007.

Boyden has become a pantomime regular making his debut in 1997 when he played alongside Frank Bruno and Karl Howman in Goldilocks and the Three Bears at Birmingham's Hippodrome Theatre. Malcolm became a pantomime dame, in 2000 when he took on the role of Mother Goose at Coventry's Belgrade Theatre. In 2002, he teamed up again with Frank Bruno as Gertie the Queen of the Circus in Goldilocks at the Wolverhampton Grand Theatre. In 2003-04 he returned to the Birmingham Hippodrome when he appeared with Julian Clary in Cinderella. In 2006 and 2007 he appeared at the Lichfield Garrick Theatre. In 2008 / 09 he was in Lichfield again with Dick Whittington. Malcolm has also appeared with the Birmingham Royal Ballet; he performed the role of the Magician's Assistant in David Bintley's The Cracked Nut.

== Trivia ==
The Birmingham-based Sunday Mercury once did a special "supplement" containing a life-size full colour pullout picture of Malcolm, which readers could assemble from five different pieces.
