= Stuart Linnell =

British radio and television broadcaster

Stuart Linnell MBE BAHons HonMA is a retired UK radio and television broadcaster, particularly well known in Coventry and Warwickshire, and in Northamptonshire. He was chair of Healthwatch Coventry for seven years, and has been chair of Coventry Community Digital Radio.

After starting his career in his native Birmingham, he was part of the on-air team at the launch of Radio Hallam in Sheffield in 1974. He was also a front-line presenter at the launch of Coventry and Warwickshire’s first local radio station, Coventry based Mercia Sound, in 1980. He worked at Mercia for fifteen years, becoming programme controller and managing director.

Later, he spent ten years as a frontline presenter at BBC Radio Northampton until 29 March 2019, when he hosted his final regular daily radio show, having announced that he was then taking semi-retirement. He continued to present weekly sports programmes in Coventry for BBC CWR, and until the restrictions imposed as a consequence of the Covid-19 pandemic Linnell also hosted other occasional shows for both BBC Radio Northampton and BBC CWR. For the 2019/2020 football season, Linnell was the host of the Friday evening football phone-in on BBC CWR, where he had previously presented the Sky Blues match-day coverage, as well as other shows. In August 2021 he announced that he would no longer be part of BBC CWR’s football coverage.

During his career he also broadcast on national and regional television, and on national radio. He also hosted the breakfast shows on BBC Radio WM, BBC CWR and BBC Radio Northampton.

== Early life and education ==
Stuart Linnell was born at Northfield in Birmingham in 1947. He attended Kings Heath High School and Kings Norton Grammar School for Boys (now Kings Norton Boys' School), both in Birmingham. He studied at Matthew Boulton Technical College and, later, at the Open University.

== Career ==
After beginning his broadcasting as a volunteer contributor to the Birmingham Hospital Broadcasting Network (BHBN), Linnell started his professional broadcasting career at the then West Midlands regional BBC centre at Pebble Mill with BBC Radio Birmingham in 1970. In 1974, he was recruited to the UK's developing commercial radio network with the launch of Radio Hallam in Sheffield.

He spent six years at Radio Hallam as sports editor, hosting all the station's main sports programmes and commentating on many major fixtures including football, cricket, boxing and speedway. He added snooker to that list when the World Professional Snooker Championship moved to a regular, annual venue at Sheffield’s Crucible Theatre in 1977. He also presented other, non-sports, shows at Radio Hallam, and during his years in Sheffield, Linnell also appeared from time to time on the regional ITV station Yorkshire Television.

In 1980 Linnell was part of the launch team at Coventry's first local radio station Mercia Sound. He stayed at Mercia for fifteen years, initially as Sports Editor hosting the station's sports programmes and commentating on various sporting fixtures. When the station started he was also presenter of the weekday afternoon show "Afternoon Delight", before going on to be Mercia's Programme Controller and then Managing Director. As local commercial radio developed, Mercia became part of a group of radio stations across the Midlands, which saw Linnell's management role involve BRMB in Birmingham, RAM FM in Derby and Leicester Sound.

In 1995 he returned to the BBC to host radio and TV programmes in the Midlands, including the Breakfast Shows on BBC WM and, later, BBC CWR.

Linnell then spent some years freelancing for radio and TV stations broadcasting to the UK and to Ireland, and he worked for a short time with the ill-fated commercial radio group Laser Broadcasting, before returning to regular front-line presenting on BBC local radio in 2009. He presented programmes for BBC Radio Derby, BBC Radio Oxford, BBC Hereford & Worcester, BBC CWR, and BBC Radio Northampton.

After seven years hosting the weekday (Monday-Friday) Breakfast Show for BBC Radio Northampton, Linnell moved to the station's Afternoon & Drive Time Show, also on weekdays. For many years he also hosted the matchday Sky Blues Live football show for BBC CWR for whom he also presented other programmes, including a period as host of the station’s faith-based Sunday Breakfast Show. For the 2019/2020 football season, he was the regular host of the BBC CWR Friday evening football phone-in show.

On 29 March 2019, Linnell hosted his final regularly scheduled afternoon show in Northampton, having announced that he was stepping down from full-time, daily broadcasting. In August 2021 he decided that he would longer be involved with BBC CWR’s football coverage, declaring that he would now follow the game as a Coventry City FC season ticket holder.

On television, he has presented the Saturday evening edition of Midlands Today on BBC One, and the Sunday lunchtime TV programme 'The Midlands At Westminster' (the forerunner to The Politics Show) which was on either BBC One or BBC Two depending on the needs of the programme schedules. He has worked for the UK national radio stations BBC Radio 5 Live, BBC Radio 5 Sports Extra and Talksport, and for the Irish national commercial station Today FM. He has also been a reporter for the TV stations Sky Sports News and Setanta Sports.

In 2008, Linnell stepped down after two years as Chairman of the Coventry Branch of the Coventry and Warwickshire Chamber of Commerce. He is a former member of the Chamber's main board.

In January 2019, he was appointed Chair of Healthwatch Coventry, whilst continuing to broadcast having become a presenter for the online radio station Serenade Radio in November 2020.

== Honours and awards ==
Linnell was made MBE for services to broadcasting in 1995. He received his medal from Her Majesty the Queen at an investiture at Buckingham Palace.

He won three Sony Radio Academy Awards – the most coveted awards in UK radio – one of them the Gold Award for the UK's best speech-based Breakfast Show (at BBC WM) in 1997, a category won the previous year by the BBC World Service and the following year by BBC Radio 5 Live. His BBC WM Breakfast Show won Silver and Gold Sony's in successive years (1996 and 1997).

At the International Radio Festival of New York, Linnell received Gold and Bronze awards respectively for the programme formats of Mercia Sound and Leicester Sound.

In 1999, he received an Honorary MA from Coventry University in recognition of his work as a broadcaster and for his services to the community in Coventry and Warwickshire. At the end of 2007 he graduated with a BA Honours in Humanities with Literature after six years of study at the Open University.

In 2010, his Sunday Breakfast Show on BBC CWR received a Merit Award in the Sandford St Martin Trust Religious Radio Awards for a series called "Dear God" in which listeners were invited to send in their messages to God, some of which were broadcast on air. They ranged from the upbeat to the loneliness of bereavement. The messages were pinned to a board displayed first at the radio station and later in Coventry Cathedral. Linnell's Sunday Breakfast Show was also a finalist in the 2012 Jerusalem Awards for its "Rev's Records" feature in which faith leaders, including the Archbishop of Canterbury and the Bishop of Coventry, chose some of their favourite music.

== Healthwatch Coventry ==
In January 2019 Linnell took on the voluntary role of Chair of Healthwatch Coventry, regarded as the champion for health and social care in Coventry. He was appointed to the post for a three-year term, which was renewed in 2022 for a further three years. After seven years in the post, he stepped down as Chair in August, 2026, citing health reasons and to spend more time with his family, including his young grandchildren.

== Coventry Community Digital Radio ==
In April 2022 Linnell accepted an invitation to be Chair of the Community Interest Company, Coventry Community Digital Radio. The company successfully applied to Ofcom for the licence to run the Local Small Scale DAB Multiplex for Coventry.

== Semi-retirement ==
In March 2019, Linnell announced that, after 50 years behind the mic, he was retiring from full-time broadcasting, but intended to still host shows on an occasional basis. He continued to appear from time to time hosting one-off shows on BBC Radio Northampton and on BBC CWR, and for the 2019/2020 football season, he was the host of the weekly, hour-long, Friday evening football phone-in show on BBC CWR.

Because of the restrictions imposed as a consequence of the COVID-19 pandemic, he last appeared on BBC Radio Northampton in the spring of 2020. From March 2020, Linnell appeared from time to time on CWR programmes featuring Coventry City F.C., until in August 2021 he announced that he was stepping down from his work with BBC CWR.

In November 2020, he joined the presentation team of the online easy listening music station Serenade Radio for whom he continues to host a show every weekend, which he presents from home.

== Autobiography ==
In July 2025, Stuart Linnell published his autobiography under the title “My Granddad knew Rasputin…and I met Elton John”. Published by Takahe Publishing Ltd., and available in paperback from Amazon, and also on Kindle, it ran to 400 pages, detailing his life from his childhood in Birmingham, through his broadcasting career in Birmingham, Sheffield, Coventry and Northampton.

== Personal life ==
Linnell has two sons and two grandchildren. He and his wife Sue live with their dogs in Coventry.
