= Timeline of BBC Radio London =

Key events for a local radio station in England

This is a timeline of BBC Radio London, a BBC Local Radio station broadcasting to the London area.

== Radio London ==
- 1970
  - 6 October – BBC Radio London launches, but only on VHF, as was generally the case for BBC Local stations at the time. It is the fourth station to launch as part of the BBC's second wave of BBC Local Radio stations and is the 12th local station to go on air. The station is on air for around six hours each day, airing BBC Radio 1 during its daytime downtime and BBC Radio 2 after it ends its final broadcast of the day.
- 1971
  - Michael Freedland presents the first edition of You Don’t Have to be Jewish.
- 1972
  - 2 September – BBC Radio London begins broadcasting on MW and is now on air for around 12 hours each day.
- 1973
  - The station's VHF frequency changes from 95.3 to 94.9.
  - 8 October – The station faces commercial competition for the first time, when the UK's first Independent Local Radio station, LBC, launches.
- 1974
  - Robbie Vincent launches a late-night phone-in show called Late Night London.
  - 22 November – The first regular programme for the black community, Black Londoners, launches, presented by Alex Pascall. The programme was initially launched as a trial run of six episodes, before becoming a weekly fixture in the schedules.
- 1975
  - No events.
- 1976
  - 12 September – The first edition of London Sounds Eastern is broadcast; it is the first Asian programme to be broadcast in English by the BBC. It replaces two 30-minute shows which had been broadcast in the Bengali, Hindi and Urdu languages.
- 1977
  - May – Robbie Vincent moves from Late Night London to the lunchtime show, swapping with David Simmons who moves to the late evening show in August.
- 1978
  - 8 May – Black Londoners relaunches as a daily programme, having previously been a weekly Friday night programme.
- 1979
  - 17 August – After more than five years on air, Late Night London is broadcast for the final time. It is not replaced and from the 20th, weekday programming ends at 10pm. Consequently, BBC Radio 2's output from 10pm to midnight is heard across London on VHF as Radio 2's VHF frequencies are handed over to Radio 1 for the John Peel and Tommy Vance shows.
  - 17 November – BBC Radio London makes major changes to its weekday programming. Home Run, which had been on air since the station's launch, is replaced by London News Desk, a new arts-based programme called Stop, Look, Listen, while London Live moves from mid-morning to early afternoon and the mid-morning slot is replaced by The Robbie Vincent Telephone Programme, with Rush Hour extended by an hour. The evening shows are dropped with weeknight programming ending at 8pm instead of 10pm, with some of the displaced programmes moving to Sunday afternoons.
- 1980
  - No events.
- 1981
  - 11 February – BBC Radio London begins broadcasting in stereo and begins carrying BBC Radio 1 during its mid-evening downtime on weekdays, between 8pm and 10pm. It reverts to Radio 2 at 10pm, when Radio 1 begins its nightly 'borrow' of Radio 2's VHF frequency.
  - The station is relaunched. It adopts an easy listening format, with music ranging from softer contemporary pop from artists such as The Carpenters to light classical music. Despite being unpopular with employed staff, who thought it very un-hip, and politicians who would question the need for a local radio station to sound like the two music-based BBC national networks, the relaunch led to improved audience figures and a string of awards and accolades.
  - Tony Blackburn joins the station to present the afternoon programme.
- 1982
  - No events.
- 1983
  - No events.
- 1984
  - The station is relaunched with the slogan The Heart and Soul of London, with more soul music being played during the day. Changes include Tony Blackburn taking over the mid-morning show.
- 1985
  - London Sounds Eastern ends after nine years on air.
- 1986
  - No events.
- 1987
  - No events.
- 1988
  - Tony Blackburn is dismissed.
  - Robbie Vincent leaves. He has been with the station since its launch.
  - 7 October – At 7pm, Radio London stops broadcasting after 18 years on air.

== Greater London Radio ==
- 1988
  - 7 October – When Radio London ends, test transmissions for Greater London Radio (GLR) begin.
  - 25 October – At 6:30am, BBC GLR launches. Put together by new managing editor Matthew Bannister and programme director Trevor Dann, the station is aimed at 25 to 45-year-olds; it is on air daily from 6:30am until 10pm, followed by a regional show, keeping the station on air until midnight. Early promotions use the phrase "rock 'n' rolling news" with a music mix best described as adult album alternative and travel news every 20 minutes. The new weekday line-up consists of Nick Abbot at breakfast, Emma Freud presenting the mid-morning show, Johnnie Walker at lunchtime, Tommy Vance hosting Drivetime and Dave Pearce hosting an evening club music show.
- 1989
  - January – Danny Baker joins the station as presenter of the weekend breakfast show.
  - Janice Long joins the station to present the breakfast show, hosting it until 1991. She replaces Nick Abbot.
  - GLR sets up a youth-based radio training facility at Vauxhall College, SW8, which was followed by a second course based at White City.
  - Vanessa Feltz joins.
- 1990
  - Chris Evans makes his on-air debut, having spent the previous year producing Danny Baker's programme. He presented a Saturday afternoon show and a weeknight evening show called The Greenhouse.
  - Summer – Dave Pearce leaves the station to join new commercial music station Kiss 100.
  - November – Johnnie Walker is dismissed after making a comment that people would be "dancing in the streets" about the resignation of Margaret Thatcher as prime minister.
- 1991
  - Managing editor Matthew Bannister leaves, to be replaced by Trevor Dann.
  - Kevin Greening and Jeremy Nicholas both replace Janice Long as presenters of the breakfast show, as she leaves the station.
  - Chris Evans moves to Saturday mornings to present Round at Chris's.
  - The station is given three years to prove itself or face closure. The threat is lifted after the BBC deemed it sufficiently patronised to remain on-air.
- 1992
  - No events.
- 1993
  - April – Chris Evans, Jonathan Coleman and Kevin Greening all leave the station to join Virgin 1215.
  - BBC GLR is forced to introduce all-speech programmes at breakfast and drivetime. Trevor Dann resigns in protest of the change.
  - November – GLR stops broadcasting on MW.
  - Dotun Adebayo joins the station to present Black London.
  - Danny Baker leaves for a while to join BBC Radio 1.
- 1994.
  - Summer – Bob Harris joins the station to present the Saturday late show, later hosting the mid-evening show on Monday to Wednesday evenings.
  - Big George Webley and Robert Elms join.
- 1995
  - Phill Jupitus joins.
- 1996
  - Danny Baker rejoins and Big George leaves the station after suffering a heart attack whilst on the air.
- 1997
  - April – Norman Jay joins.
- 1998
  - Danny Baker and Bob Harris leave.
- 1999
  - Following a consultation exercise on local broadcasting in the South East, the BBC decided to rebrand GLR and substantially change the programming. A campaign to Save GLR is organised and a petition delivered to the BBC. Although the campaign was unsuccessful in saving GLR, and the rebranding went ahead the following year, it demonstrated the existence of a loyal audience for its format.

== London Live 94.9 ==
- 2000
  - 27 March – BBC London Live 94.9 replaces GLR. The refreshed station is more speech-focused and broadcasts around the clock. The relaunch sees the arrival of Lisa I'Anson, Vanessa Feltz and Eddie Nestor.
  - July – The station starts broadcasting via DAB.
  - Phill Jupitus leaves.

== BBC London 94.9 ==
- 2001
  - 1 October
    - BBC London Live changes its name to BBC London 94.9 and the presenter line-up is changed. Danny Baker joins to present a Saturday morning show, which is co-hosted with American comedian Amy Lamé. Jon Gaunt hosts the mid-morning phone-in show. Vanessa Feltz replaces Lisa I'Anson in the afternoon slot, with Eddie Nestor and Kath Melandri presenting drivetime, and Tony Blackburn returns to present a Saturday classic soul music and chat show.
    - London 94.9 becomes the first BBC local station to begin live streaming on the internet.
- 2002
  - March – Danny Baker becomes the new presenter of the breakfast show.
- 2003
  - A number of specialist shows are axed.
  - October – JoAnne Good joins to present the overnight programme.
  - Lisa I'Anson leaves.
- 2004
  - Tony Blackburn rejoins the station.
- 2005
  - 25 July – Jonathan Coleman rejoins to present the 3–5pm afternoon show.
  - 17 October – JoAnne Good and Jonathan Coleman take over as presenters of the breakfast show. They replace Danny Baker who moves to the afternoon slot.
  - The station starts broadcasting on Sky in the London area. It can also be accessed elsewhere in the UK and Ireland by manual tuning.
- 2006
  - August – Big George returns.
  - Late 2006 – Jonathan Coleman leaves the station.
- 2007
  - No events.
- 2008
  - February – Norman Jay leaves following a decision to move his show to a digital-only slot.
- 2009
  - No events.
- 2010
  - 11 January – The first edition of The Late Show with Joanne Good is broadcast and Gaby Roslin joins on a full-time basis to replace JoAnne as co-host of the breakfast show with Paul Ross.
  - 23 April – Nikki Bedi joins.
- 2011
  - No events.
- 2012
  - 24 November – The final edition of The Late Show with Joanne Good is broadcast.
  - 25 November – A line-up change takes place. JoAnne Good moves to the afternoon show, replacing Danny Baker who leaves the station. and Simon Lederman takes over the weeknight late show.
- 2013
  - 2 January – Penny Smith replaces Gaby Roslin as co-presenter of the breakfast show. Other schedule changes see JoAnne Good move to the mid-afternoon programme, with Simon Lederman taking over the weeknight late show and Nikki Bedi presenting the weekend late show.
  - 5 January – The BBC Local Radio stations begin a new Saturday evening show titled BBC Introducing. Hosted by a local presenter on each station, the programme's aim is to promote musicians from the area.
  - 7 January – The debut of the BBC's networked evening programme takes place, hosted by former Classic FM presenter Mark Forrest. The show replaces all local programming, apart from local sport coverage.
- 2014
  - No events.
- 2015
  - 5 July – Duncan Barkes joins to present London's Late Night Radio Phone-in.

== BBC Radio London ==
- 2015
  - 6 October – After 27 years, the name BBC Radio London returns to the airwaves.
- 2016
  - 4 January – Vanessa Feltz becomes the new breakfast show presenter. She replaces Penny Smith who leaves the station to join Talk Radio, and Nikki Bedi moves to the weekday early show. Other changes see Robert Elms taking over the mid-morning show and Eddie Nestor hosting drivetime.
  - 25 February – Tony Blackburn is dismissed by the BBC.
  - Paul Ross leaves after six years.
- 2017
  - 1 January – Tony Blackburn returns, being rehired by the BBC.
  - 8 October – In a speech marking the 50th anniversary of BBC local radio, The Director-General of the BBC, Tony Hall, announces that the national evening show will be axed, resulting in local programming returning to BBC Radio London weeknight evenings.
- 2018
  - 26 November – Following the decision to reinstate local programmes on weeknights, BBC Radio London launches The Scene, which is described as "a platform for London’s community arts, entertainment and cultural activities, featuring new talent and emerging artists, performers and creators." Six new presenters are recruited to host the show.
- 2019
  - 22 April – Nikki Bedi leaves.
- 2020
  - 23 March–5 July – BBC Radio London's overnight programming is heard across the UK following a decision by the BBC to broadcast a single UK-wide overnight show, so that it can prioritise resources during the COVID-19 pandemic. The show is broadcast on all BBC Local Radio stations and on BBC Radio 5 Live.
  - 6 July
    - BBC Radio 5 Live stops relaying overnight broadcasting from BBC Radio London on weeknights but continues to simulcast BBC Radio London on Friday and Saturday overnights.
    - Jason Rosam takes over as the weekday presenter of the early breakfast show. The first hour of the two-hour programme is also broadcast on all of the other BBC Local Radio stations.
- 2021
  - 13 September – BBC Radio London's daytime schedule is revamped. Eddie Nestor takes over the Monday to Thursday editions of the mid-morning show with Robert Elms presenting the show from Friday to Sunday. Former GB Olympic athlete Jeanette Kwakye presents afternoons Monday–Thursday and JoAnne Good returns to the late show, presenting the programme four nights a week.
- 2022
  - 26 August – Vanessa Feltz presents her final show, after more than two decades at the station.
  - 31 October – Salma El-Wardany becomes presenter of the breakfast show from Mondays to Thursdays, with Riz Lateef presenting on Fridays.
- 2023
  - 17 December – Tony Blackburn presents his final Soul on Sunday show, having decided to leave the station after four decades.
- 2024
  - 5 January – Jason Rosam's early breakfast show ends, due to him leaving the BBC; he has presented the programme for three years.
- 2025
  - 6 January – Aaron Paul begins presenting breakfast from Mondays to Thursdays; Riz Lateef continues with the show on Fridays.

== See also ==
- Timeline of BBC Local Radio
