= Trish Adudu =

English journalist and television presenter

- Born: Patricia Adudu; Bristol, England
- Occupations: Journalist; television presenter
- Years active: 1992-present
- Television: Midlands Today; Loose Women
- Children: 2

Patricia "Trish" Adudu is an English freelance journalist and television presenter.

== Early life ==
Adudu's parents are Jamaican and Nigerian immigrants.

== Career ==
Adudu graduated from the University of Birmingham and has a Master's Degree from the University of Warwick. In the 1990s, Adudu was a regular contributor, reporter and presenter for BBC GLR 94.9fm. In 1992 she began training as a producer, working on Match of the Day and Grandstand. When Talk Radio UK launched in 1995, she appeared on a number of shows across the schedule, usually contributing to discussions on sport. In 1997, Adudu worked on the launch of Channel 5 and worked as their sports presenter until 2006. She was an original member of the Loose Women panel, appearing from 1999 to 2002.

While her children were growing up, Adudu worked as a media teacher at Henley College in Coventry from 2001 until 2014. During this time she produced some TV shows such as Fighting Back: The Michael Watson Story and Child Snatchers.

In 2014, Adudu returned to television, presenting on The One Show and some weekend editions of Midlands Today.

She joined BBC CWR in 2015 and currently presents the Weekday Afternoon programme from 14:00 to 18:00 on CWR and BBC Radio WM.

== Personal life ==
Adudu has two adult sons and lives in Coventry with her partner Ezzie, a chef.
