= Today in Parliament =

British political news radio programme

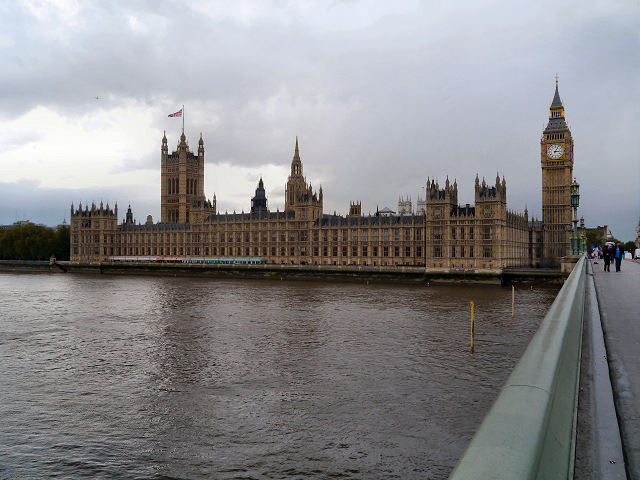
The Houses of Parliament, Westminster, London

Today in Parliament is a British radio programme on BBC Radio 4 that covers the daily proceedings of the Palace of Westminster (Houses of Parliament). It has a sibling programme, Yesterday in Parliament, which is also broadcast on BBC Radio 4. There is much crossover, in terms of content, between the two programmes.

Today in Parliament is broadcast at just after 11:30pm and Yesterday in Parliament is broadcast at 5:04am.

== History ==
The programme began on 9 October 1945 at 22.45. It is the only programme that the BBC is required to make under its charter.

In 1978 the public were allowed to hear MPs in parliament.

In 1998 Yesterday in Parliament stopped being broadcast on FM. Instead it was broadcast only on long wave, opting-out from the Today programme.

In April 2024, following the end of Radio 4's long wave opt-outs, Yesterday in Parliament moved to BBC Radio 4 Extra, with a later start time of 9am.

On 24 March 2025, Yesterday in Parliament returned to Radio 4 and began being broadcast in a new slot of 5:04 am.

== Content ==
Each episode of Today in Parliament begins with the Speaker announcing Order, order and is available daily as a podcast.

Yesterday in Parliament is presented by a different journalist to the presenter of the episode of Today in Parliament which covers the same day, and includes a preview of the parliamentary proceedings which are coming up on the day of transmission.

Both Today in Parliament and Yesterday in Parliament are presented on rotation either by Susan Hulme, Alicia McCarthy or Sean Curran.

== Audience ==
Today in Parliament claims to have a regular audience of around 500,000 listeners.

== See also ==
- The Week in Westminster
- Political podcast
