= Annie Othen =

British journalist and broadcaster

- Born: Ann Rosella Othen; 1956 (age 69–70); Hornchurch, Essex, England
- Occupations: Broadcaster and journalist

Annie Othen is a journalist and broadcaster. She began working in commercial radio in 1983, later joining the BBC in 1993 where she has presented both national and local radio shows. Annie has presented the mid-morning show on BBC CWR. In 2011 she was nominated for a Gillard radio award and again in 2013.

== Education ==
Othen attended Blackdown High School, Leamington Spa.

Othen gained an honours degree at the University of Warwick in Sociology. Post-graduate studies in Education and associate degree in dance (IDTA).

== Early career ==
Othen started off in press and Public relations for Aga and Rangemaster. In an interview given in 2007 she explained how she got her first job in radio. Annie joined Mercia Sound in 1983 where she presented the late night show and afternoon shows. After Mercia she worked for a large number of commercial radio stations including launching Xtra Am, Heart FM, and Jazz FM.

== TV career ==
Othen was an integral part of the launch team for the first Cable TV in the Midlands, Coventry Cable TV. Television reporting includes BBC Midlands Today.

== Later career ==
Othen joined the BBC in 1993, joining BBC WM at Pebble Mill. In 1998 and 1999 she broadcast on BBC Radio 2 presenting late night and early morning shows and has been a contributor to Radio 4. With a keen interest in political journalism, notable interviews have made national headlines including the then Home Secretary Jack Straw and Prime Minister David Cameron. She presented the Annie Othen Show on BBC CWR broadcasting weekday mornings. Prior to that, she presented the Breakfast Show for six years. In 2011, Annie won a Bronze Gillard award for 'best mid-morning show' and in 2013 was a recipient of a Gold Gillard for radio Impact category. Othen remains a guest presenter on BBC Coventry and Warwickshire.

Othen regularly hosts the annual 'Carols at Warwick Castle' event.

== Other work ==
Othen was a lecturer in Radio Production and Journalism at Coventry University for a number of years. In March 2012, she presented a Journalism Masterclass. She has also been guest lecturer at University of Warwick and lecturer in Radio Production and Presentation at Warwickshire College for sixteen years.

Othen also trained as a dancer and coached a team to the finals of BBC Come Dancing. She once performed for Omar Sharif
