= Bay Radio (Spain) =

BayRadio
- Spain
- Broadcast area: Costa Blanca
- Frequencies: 89.2 (Denia), 98.5 FM (Jávea), 89.4 FM (Benidorm), 89.0 & 107.6 FM (Murcia)

Programming
- Language: English
- Format: Music radio

Ownership
- Owner: BayRadio

Links
- Webcast: https://www.bayradio.fm/radiochannel/bayradio/
- Website: http://www.bayradio.fm/

Bay Radio is an English language radio station for expatriates in Spain. It serves the Costa Blanca, broadcasting from Valencia to Murcia. The station is on-air 24 hours a day.

== Program ==
=== Weekdays ===
08:00am : Dougie Mack’s Morning Glory
11:00am : Emma Scott’s Lunchbox
14:00 : The 2 o’clock ‘Takeover’: Afternoon Anthems! (leave a voice note via WhatsApp) 15:00 : Moody In The Afternoon
15:00 (Friday) : Moody & Rosy’s Friday Feeling
18:00 : Bay Radio’s Greatest Hits
18:00 (Friday) : The Friday Feeling Extra
22:00 : The Groovline with Stephen Howie (R&B & funky house)
00:00 : Bay Radio’s Greatest Hits

=== Saturday ===
08:00 : Wake Up with Mark Deakin
12:00 : Ride on the Rhythm with Dougie Mack
14:00 : The Bay Radio International Top 10
15:00 : The Sound Of Summer (autumn/winter update tbc)
19:00 : Club Classics
00:00 : Bay Radio’s Greatest Hits

=== Sunday ===
09:00 : Weekend Breakfast with Mark Deakin
15:00 : Sunday Brunch with Rosy
16:00 : Totally 90s with Gary King
18:00 : Soulshyne with Mick Fuller
20:00 : Sweet Grooves with Mike Panteli
22:00 : Bay Radio’s Greatest Hits
