= BBC CWR =

Radio station in Coventry, England

- Coventry; England
- Broadcast area: Coventry and Warwickshire
- Frequencies: FM: 94.8 (Coventry and north Warwickshire); FM: 103.7 (south Warwickshire); FM: 104.0 (Nuneaton); DAB: 12D; Freeview: 711
- RDS: BBC CWR

Programming
- Language: English
- Format: Local news, talk and music

Ownership
- Owner: BBC Local Radio; BBC West Midlands

History
- First air date: 17 January 1990 (original); 3 September 2005 (relaunch)
- Former names: BBC Coventry and Warwickshire (2005–2020)

Technical information
- Licensing authority: Ofcom
- Transmitter coordinates: 52.4096°N 1.5084°W

Links
- Website: www.bbc.co.uk/sounds/play/live/bbc_radio_coventry_warwickshire

BBC CWR (Coventry & Warwickshire Radio) is the BBC's local radio station serving Coventry and Warwickshire.

It broadcasts on FM, DAB, digital TV, and via BBC Sounds from studios at Priory Place in Coventry city centre.

According to RAJAR, the station has a weekly audience of 67,000 listeners as of May 2025.

== History ==
=== BBC CWR launch ===
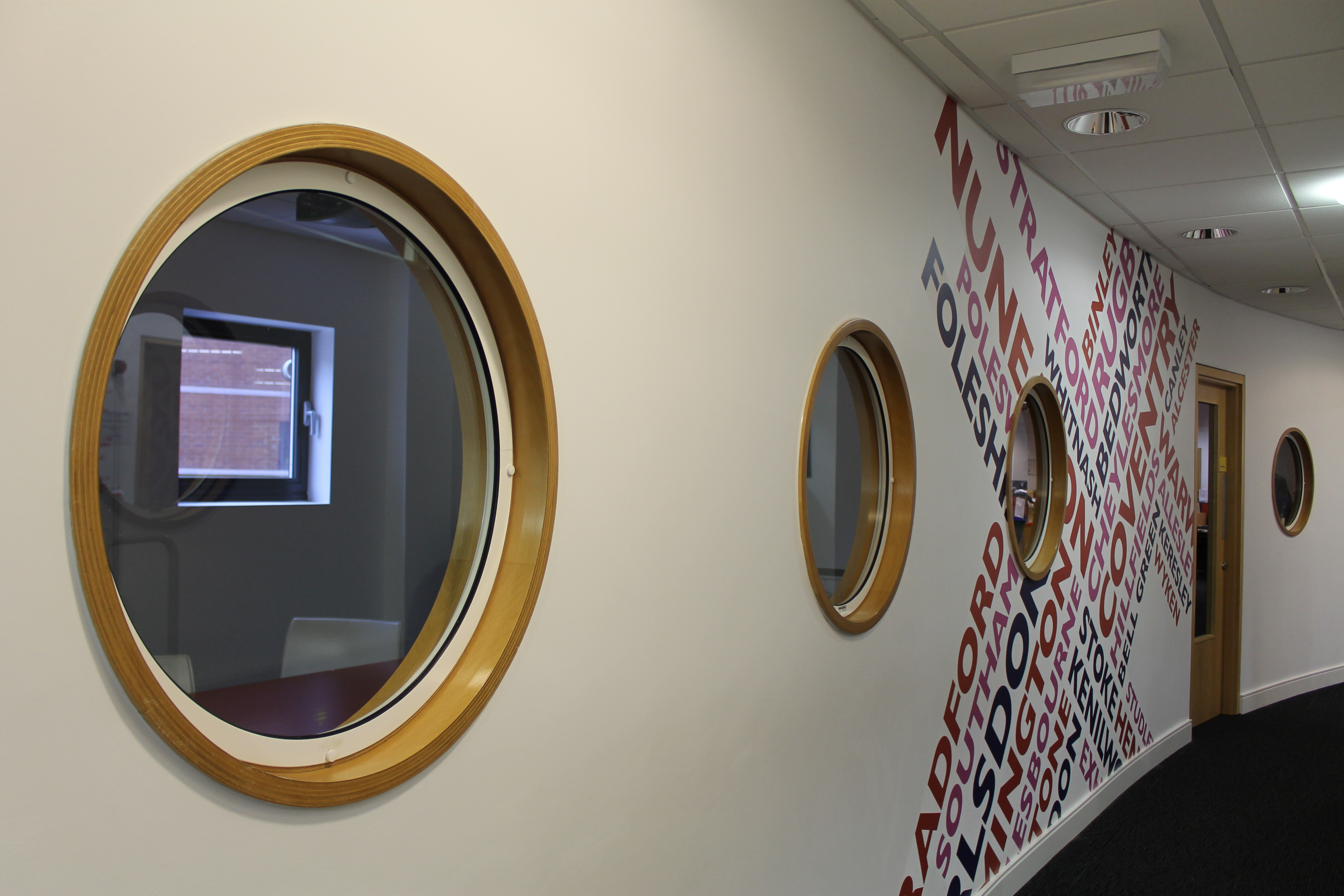
The BBC CWR studios.

In the early 1990s, BBC Local Radio underwent an expansion programme where counties and other areas without a local radio station were identified. Five stations were to launch: BBC Radio Surrey, BBC Radio Berkshire, BBC Radio Suffolk, BBC Wiltshire Sound and BBC Radio Warwickshire.

The Radio Warwickshire working title was changed to BBC CWR by the time the station launched on 17 January 1990 as the name CWR (Coventry and Warwickshire Radio) reflected the wider area that the new station would cover, taking in the city of Coventry with the whole of the county of Warwickshire, which was then also served by BBC Radio WM. The station broadcast from a Victorian-style mansion on Warwick Road, close to Coventry railway station. Smaller studios were located in Atherstone, Nuneaton, Rugby, Stratford-upon-Avon, Leamington and Warwick.

=== Problems and closure ===
From its launch, BBC CWR faced strong competition from the established commercial radio stations in the area. Mercia Sound had been an outstanding success since its own launch ten years earlier in 1980. Xtra AM, the AM-only sister station of Mercia Sound, also enjoyed high listenership since it split from Mercia and launched in 1989. Consequently, CWR seemed to find it difficult to compete for the very large audiences built up by Mercia and Xtra. It was, however, well-respected and highly regarded by its regular audience.

=== BBC WM merger ===
The BBC, under then director-general of the BBC, John Birt, deemed that CWR was not sufficiently successful in audience terms to warrant its continuation, and within increasing financial constraints in February 1995, CWR was to close. Regular listeners were hugely disappointed and phoned presenter Jon Gaunt to protest about the decision. It was ultimately decided that BBC CWR would merge with neighbouring BBC Radio WM in Birmingham, but would operate as an opt-out service from Radio WM with the remainder of the schedule as shared programming. This merger took place in May 1995. This had the effect of alienating local listeners, whilst paradoxically presenters from WM, such as Ed Doolan, Malcolm Boyden and Tony Butler received high listening figures and distinctions with three Sony Radio Academy Awards, including Radio Station of the Year in 1996.

Its studios were relocated from Warwick Road to much smaller premises on Greyfriars Road. All local programmes except breakfast with Annie Othen, the afternoon show with Bob Brolly, Poles Apart on Wednesdays, and weekend football coverage of Coventry City, were replaced with programming from Birmingham.

In 2003, the station was re-labelled as BBC WM across Coventry and Warwickshire.

=== BBC Coventry and Warwickshire relaunch ===
In 2003, the then director-general of the BBC, Greg Dyke, announced on air that Coventry and Warwickshire would again have its own BBC Local Radio station. Describing the situation with presenter Annie Othen, Dyke said that the station would be added to the BBC's Local Radio portfolio:

I'm very pleased to announce that we're planning to open a new radio station in Coventry – an area that's been served by BBC WM since 1995. We hope the new station will be housed in a modern, vibrant building close to Coventry Cathedral in the heart of the city. Alongside the radio studios, there'll also be an open centre to provide access to BBC Learning facilities similar to the already established centres in Blackburn, Sheffield and Stoke. Open Centres provide a valuable community role, so this is an exciting venture for the BBC.

He also said that the 1995 closure of CWR was a "mistake":

The decision was made under different circumstances – and now we're in a position to change it.

BBC Coventry and Warwickshire relaunched as a standalone station on 3 September 2005 with full local programming for 15 hours a day.

In February 2020, BBC Coventry & Warwickshire reverted to the BBC CWR name.

== Technical ==
The BBC initially supplied two powerful FM transmitters for BBC CWR to cover the whole of the county. A 2.2 kilowatt transmitter at an existing tower at Meriden provides Coventry and northern Warwickshire with a good signal on 94.8 MHz, a frequency vacated by BRMB Radio in Birmingham before it moved to 96.4 MHz in 1989.

The southern Warwickshire area receives a strong signal on 103.7 MHz from a 1.4 kW transmitter located at an existing television relay site on a hill at Lark Stoke, 4.7 miles (7.5 km) west-northwest of Shipston-on-Stour and 7.5 miles (12 km) south of Stratford-upon-Avon.

A small pocket of poor reception in Nuneaton was later resolved by adding a low-power relay transmitter on 104.0 MHz.

BBC CWR went digital shortly after the launch of the local DAB multiplex on 31 January 2001 with NOW Digital Coventry in the Coventry area with transmissions from Samuel Vale House (central Coventry), Barwell Water Tower near Hinckley, Meriden, Leamington Spa and Daventry in Northamptonshire.

The station also broadcasts on Freeview TV channel 711 in the BBC West Midlands region and streams online via BBC Sounds.

== Programming ==
Local programming is produced and broadcast from the BBC's Coventry studios from 6 am to 2 pm on Mondays to Fridays, and for sports coverage.

The station usually broadcasts the whole of the Late Night programme, a programme carried by all BBC Local Radio stations (except in the case of sports coverage), which is broadcast between 10 pm and 1 am.

During the station's overnight downtime, BBC CWR simulcasts programming from BBC Radio 5 Live.

=== Sports coverage ===
The station provides coverage of a range of sports, including live commentary, reports, and updates. The flagship sports programme is BBC CWR Sport (also referred to on air as Sky Blues Sport). It is broadcast mostly on Saturday afternoons (and occasionally on Sundays and weeknights). The mainstay of the coverage is live match commentary of Coventry City matches. Clive Eakin is the primary commentator as of 2001, and primary presenter from 2001 to 2023, with Rob Gurney rejoining the station as lead presenter in 2023. As of 2019, co-commentary is primarily provided by former Coventry City player Steve Ogrizovic, following his retirement as the club's goalkeeper coach, with Dave Bennett being the typical stand-in. Before this, Clive Eakin would be joined by various ex-players or managers for co-commentary.The Sound of the Sky Blues, a phone-in programme about Coventry City, airs on Mondays and Fridays.

After their relocation to Coventry but before their 2022 liquidation, the station provided live match commentary of Wasps RFC games (as a part of BBC Sport's national contract with Premiership Rugby). Coventry RFC's matches in the RFU Championship are also covered live. Alec Blackman, John Butler, and Richard Moon are all involved with rugby coverage.

Online match commentary and radio reports of Leamington's and Nuneaton Borough's games are also provided. Commentary of Warwickshire County Cricket Club games can be found on air and online.

== Presenters ==
=== Notable current presenters ===
- Trish Adudu (weekday afternoons)
- Steve Ogrizovic (BBC CWR Sport)

=== Notable past presenters ===
- Malcolm Boyden
- Bob Brolly (Sunday afternoons)
- Ed Doolan
- Jon Gaunt
- Jim Lee
- Alex Lester
- Stuart Linnell
- Les Ross
- Tony Wadsworth
- Wincey Willis

== See also ==
- Capital Mid-Counties
- Hits Radio Coventry & Warwickshire
