= BBC Hereford & Worcester =

BBC Local Radio service for Herefordshire and Worcestershire, England

Coordinates: 52.1942°N 2.2330°W

- Worcester; England
- Broadcast area: Herefordshire and Worcestershire
- Frequencies: FM: 94.7 MHz (Herefordshire); FM: 104.0 MHz (Worcester and Malvern); FM: 104.4 MHz (Bromsgrove, Redditch and Alvechurch); FM: 104.6 MHz (Kidderminster); DAB: 12A; Freeview: 712
- RDS: BBC H&W

Programming
- Language: English
- Format: Local news, talk and music

Ownership
- Owner: BBC Local Radio, BBC West Midlands

History
- First air date: 14 February 1989
- Former frequencies: 738 MW; 1584 MW

Technical information
- Licensing authority: Ofcom

Links
- Website: www.bbc.co.uk/sounds/play/live/bbc_radio_hereford_worcester

BBC Hereford & Worcester is the BBC's local radio station serving the counties of Herefordshire and Worcestershire, which were one county from 1974 to 1998.

It broadcasts on FM, DAB, digital TV and online via BBC Sounds from studios on Hylton Road in Worcester.

According to RAJAR, the station has 82,000 listeners with a reach of 15% as of Q4 2025.

== History ==
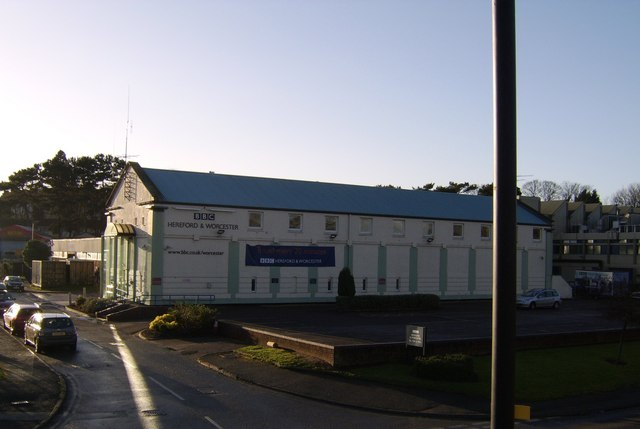
BBC Hereford and Worcester's studio building

The concept for siting a local BBC Radio station within the, soon to be combined county of Hereford and Worcester, emerged as early as 1973 as part of the BBC's evidence to the Crawford Committee on Broadcasting Coverage and reinforced in the BBC's response to the Annan Report of 1977. However, due to concerns about competition, and in particular a smaller than expected rise in the BBC's licence fee following the report, further local radio station ambitions were halted.

The station began broadcasting on 14 February 1989 (Valentine's Day), and to mark the unusual, two-centre set-up for the radio station, the first record played was the song "Two Hearts" by Phil Collins. The original team of presenters included Graham Day (mid-morning), Gill Capewell (afternoons) and Allan Lee (drive). Other staff included Robert Piggott (now BBC Religious Affairs correspondent), TV journalist Liz MacKean and former LBC presenter Jeremy Dry.

When the station first began, Jane Garvey (of BBC Radio 5 Live) was one of the team of journalists. A few months later, she took over the Breakfast Show and went on to win a Sony Award with it.

It serves the rural communities across Herefordshire as well as the more populous Worcestershire with a range of programmes from news, sport, consumer, arts, religion, gardening, jazz, funk, northern soul and local music. Notable guests on the station have included the Archbishop of Canterbury Justin Welby in October 2016.

The station's original studio based in Hereford (which supplemented the primary Worcester base) was used from the station's launch in 1989, until the studio closed in December 2016, with the station occupying a temporary location in the city as they sought a more permanent home. This studio had been used for key programmes within the schedule, including the breakfast show during the early 2000s. The solution emerged in December 2020 when the station entered a collaboration with the Hereford College of Arts to base their Hereford studio within their College Road campus.

As a result of licence fee freezes and associated budget cuts arising from the Delivering Quality First plan in 2011, programmes on BBC Local Radio stations began to be shared across regions in periods of lower demand such as evenings and medium wave transmitters began to be closed down where coverage matched FM and DAB transmissions. Following a further freeze in the licence fee by the government in January 2022, the BBC announced further cuts to BBC Local Radio in October that same year, which will see weekday afternoon programmes shared with a neighbouring station and programming in the evenings, Saturdays and on Sunday mornings shared regionally with several stations.

== Technical ==
BBC Hereford and Worcester transmits on FM. The original, and two strongest FM transmitters are on 104 FM (Great Malvern, serving Worcestershire) and 94.7 FM (Ridge Hill, between Ross On Wye and Ledbury near Much Marcle, serving Herefordshire). These signals are not particularly powerful, and have limited coverage outside the two counties, unlike stations such as BBC Radio WM. An additional FM transmitter on 104.6 FM improved coverage in the Kidderminster area and in February 2006, a new transmitter was turned on for Redditch (Headless Cross) on 104.4FM, as reception in the town had been unreliable.

From launch until 13 May 2021, BBC Hereford and Worcester broadcast on medium wave with the main AM transmitter on 738 kHz on the western edge of Worcester and covered most of the two counties. Originally, there was another AM transmitter for Hereford on 819 kHz; that frequency was given up to accommodate a new commercial station for south Shropshire. In 2003, a small transmitter on 1584 kHz at Woofferton, just south of Ludlow, was added to the station transferring from BBC Radio Shropshire.

The station started broadcasting on DAB in December 2013 with the new MuxCo Herefordshire and Worcestershire multiplex at the Bromsgrove, Ridge Hill and Malvern transmitter sites. This was extended in August 2016 with a further transmitter at Hereford and in September with another at Kidderminster.

On Freeview, the station is carried by the main transmitters at Ridge Hill, Sutton Coldfield and The Wrekin, and by their associated relays, covering a much larger area than FM or DAB. The station also streams online via BBC Sounds.

== Programming ==
Until 2023, local programming was produced and broadcast from the BBC's Worcester studios from 6 am to 10 pm each day, comprising a 6 am to 10 am breakfast show, 10 am to 2 pm morning show, 2 pm to 6 pm afternoon show and 6 pm to 10 pm evening show. The station's programming which is exclusive to the station is now mainly broadcast between 6am and 2pm on weekdays. Programming outside of these times is mainly shared with some other stations or with one other station. These shows must contain at least 60% speech content within the core broadcast hours of 6 am to 7 pm, with full speech content during the breakfast peak of 7 am to 8:30 am. The station must also contain at least 95 hours of locally made programming per week, that provides news, information and content relevant to the areas and communities it serves.

The station's Saturday afternoon show is occupied by sports coverage under the BBC Hereford and Worcester Sport banner with The Sunday Gardening Show occupying the Sunday afternoon slot. On both weekend days, the evening slot is occupied by the BBC Music Introducing programme which features music from new and up and coming artists from the local area. The show helped discover and launch the careers of Ellie Goulding (whose first air-play was on the station), Becky Hill and 220 Kid.

The station's late shows, airing from 10 pm to 1 am, originates from BBC Radio WM in Birmingham and is broadcast additionally to other BBC Local Radio stations in the West Midlands (BBC CWR, BBC Radio Stoke, BBC Radio Shropshire) and some nights of the week to stations in the East Midlands (BBC Radio Derby, BBC Radio Leicester and BBC Radio Nottingham).

On a Monday and Friday evening, Malcolm Boyden presents "The Bench Warmers" local sporting programme between 18:00 and 19:00.

During the station's downtime, BBC Hereford & Worcester simulcasts overnight programming from BBC Radio 5 Live between 1 am and 5 am and an early morning breakfast programme broadcast across the Local Radio network from BBC Radio London.

== Presenters ==
=== Notable current presenters ===
- Tammy Gooding (Weekday Breakfast)
- Elliott Webb (Weekday Mid-Morning)
- Toni McDonald (Weekday Afternoons)
- Malcolm Boyden ("The Bench Warmers" Local Sports)

=== Notable former presenters ===
- Jane Garvey
- Howard Bentham
- Wincey Willis
