= Timeline of BBC Local Radio =

This is a timeline of BBC Local Radio.

== 1960s ==
- 1962
  - 27 June – The Pilkington Committee on Broadcasting publishes its report and recommends that the BBC should extend its activities to the creation of local radio stations in order to prevent the introduction of commercial radio.
  - The BBC runs a series of closed circuit experiments in local radio from a variety of locations across England.
- 1966
  - A government White Paper paves the way for the launch of a small number (eight) of two-year experimental BBC Local Radio stations.
- 1967
  - 8 November – At 12:45pm, BBC Local Radio launches when the first station, BBC Radio Leicester, starts broadcasting.
  - 15 November – BBC Radio Sheffield launches.
  - 22 November – BBC Radio Merseyside launches.
- 1968
  - 31 January – BBC Radio Nottingham launches and four days later, the station hosts the UK's first ever radio phone-in.
  - 14 February – BBC Radio Brighton launches.
  - 14 March – BBC Radio Stoke launches.
  - 24 June – BBC Radio Leeds launches.
  - 3 July – BBC Radio Durham launches.
- 1969
  - 10 July – The BBC publishes a report called "Broadcasting in the Seventies" proposing replacing regional broadcasting on BBC Radio 4 with BBC Local Radio.
  - BBC Local Radio is made permanent after the two-year experiment is judged to have been a success.

== 1970s ==
- 1970
  - 4 September – BBC Radio Bristol launches.
  - 10 September – BBC Radio Manchester launches.
  - 6 October – BBC Radio London launches.
  - 29 October – BBC Radio Oxford launches.
  - 9 November – BBC Radio Birmingham launches.
  - 18 December – BBC Radio Medway launches.
  - 31 December – BBC Radio Solent and BBC Radio Teesside launch.
- 1971
  - 2 January – BBC Radio Newcastle launches.
  - 26 January – BBC Radio Blackburn launches.
  - 25 February – BBC Radio Humberside launches.
  - 29 April – BBC Radio Derby launches.
- 1972
  - 25 August – When the government restricted the BBC to twenty local radio stations, the corporation responds by closing BBC Radio Durham. Its resources are transferred to Carlisle where BBC Radio Carlisle, now BBC Radio Cumbria, is formed.
  - 2 September – BBC Local Radio stations begin broadcasting on MW. Prior to this, the stations have only been available on VHF.
- 1973
  - 8 October – BBC Local Radio faces competition for the first time when the UK's first Independent Local Radio station, LBC, launches.
  - 24 November – BBC Radio Carlisle launches.
- 1974
  - 1 April – Following the formation of the county of Cleveland, BBC Radio Teesside is renamed BBC Radio Cleveland.
- 1975
  - No events.
- 1976
  - No events.
- 1977
  - No events.
- 1978
  - No events.
- 1979
  - No events.

== 1980s ==
- 1980
  - Summer – Ahead of the start of further expansion of BBC Local Radio, regional news and opt-out programming on BBC Radio 4 ends, apart from in the south west as this is now the only part of England still without any immediate plans for the launch of a BBC local station.
  - 11 September – BBC Radio Norfolk launches.
  - 11 November – BBC Radio Lincolnshire launches.
- 1981
  - 4 July – BBC Radio Blackburn expands to cover all of Lancashire and is renamed accordingly.
  - 23 November – BBC Radio Birmingham expands to cover the West Midlands, South Staffordshire, north Worcestershire and north Warwickshire and is relaunched as BBC Radio WM.
- 1982
  - 15 and 16 March – BBC Local Radio starts broadcasting to the Channel Islands when BBC Radio Guernsey and BBC Radio Jersey launch.
  - 1 May – BBC Radio Cambridgeshire launches.
  - 25 May – BBC Radio Carlisle expands to cover all of Cumbria and is renamed accordingly and as part of the expansion, BBC Radio Furness launches as an opt-out service for the south of the county.
  - 30–31 May – BBC Radio York is given permission to provide a temporary service to cover Pope John Paul II's visit to York. The service, which runs for just over 24 hours, operates on what will become BBC Radio York's MW frequency when the station launches the following year.
  - 16 June – BBC Radio Northampton launches.
  - 31 December – The final BBC Radio 4 regional opt-out ends when the final edition of Morning Sou'West is broadcast, ahead of the launches of BBC Radio Devon and BBC Radio Cornwall.
- 1983
  - 17 January – BBC Radio Devon and BBC Radio Cornwall launch.
  - 2 July – BBC Radio Medway is expanded to cover all of the county of Kent and is renamed accordingly.
  - 4 July – BBC Radio York launches on a permanent basis.
  - 22 October – BBC Radio Brighton is expanded to cover all of the county of Sussex and is renamed accordingly.
  - 12 December – BBC Radio Bury launches as a trial community radio station. It opt-outs on MW from BBC Radio Manchester for a few hours each day. It is the first of five such trial stations, each operating in various parts of the Manchester area. Each station is on air for a few weeks.
- 1984
  - During the first half of 1984, the other community radio station trials take place. The station airdates are BBC Radio Bury (late 1983/early 1984), BBC Radio Oldham, BBC Radio Rochdale (eight weeks from 14 May 1984), BBC Radio Trafford and BBC Radio Skelmersdale (Summer 1984).
- 1985
  - 23 April – BBC Radio Shropshire launches.
  - 24 June – BBC Radio Bedfordshire launches.
- 1986
  - 25 August – An early evening service of specialist music programmes launches on the BBC's four local radio stations in Yorkshire. The programmes are broadcast on weeknights between 6pm and 7:30pm.
  - 5 November – BBC Essex launches.
- 1987
  - September – The service of specialist music programmes broadcast on the BBC's four local stations in Yorkshire is expanded. Programmes are broadcast on six nights a week (Wednesday to Monday) and the length of each programme is increased by 30 minutes. Consequently, the four stations now stay on air into the mid-evening as they are transmitted between 7pm and 9pm.
- 1988
  - 11 April – BBC Somerset Sound launches as an opt-out station from BBC Radio Bristol. It broadcasts on BBC Radio Bristol's former MW frequency of 1323AM.
  - 20 September – The Radio Data System (RDS) launches, allowing car radios to automatically retune, display station identifiers and switch to local travel news.
  - 3 October – BBC Radio Gloucestershire launches.
  - 7 October – At 7pm, BBC Radio London closes and instead of handing over to Radio 2, the frequency immediately begins broadcasting test transmissions in preparation for the launch of its replacement, Greater London Radio (GLR).
  - 25 October – At 6:30am, BBC GLR launches.
  - 29 October – Network North West launches, providing a nightly service of programmes from 7:30pm until midnight. It is broadcast on the BBC's four north west stations.
  - 30 October – BBC GMR replaces BBC Radio Manchester.
  - By the end of 1988, regular evening programming on weeknights has launched in some areas. The programming is mostly regional rather than local with the same programme networked on all the stations in that area. Consequently, stations are now starting to provide local/regional programming on weeknights until midnight. Previously, stations had ended local programming by mid-evening, handing over to BBC Radio 2 until the following morning.
  - Starting in late 1988, and following the commencement in September of the roll-out of FM transmitters for BBC Radio 1, BBC Local stations which broadcast in areas where Radio 1 still does not have an FM transmitter begin to air Radio 1 instead of Radio 2 during their evening downtime, switching to Radio 2 when Radio 1 closes at 2am.
- 1989
  - 14 February – BBC Hereford and Worcester launches.
  - 4 March – BBC Wiltshire Sound launches.
  - WM Heartlands launches as a mid-morning experimental opt-out from BBC WM. It serves the 'Heartlands' area of East Birmingham using the 1458MW frequency.
  - 29 May – The BBC Night Network launches on the BBC's six local radio stations in Yorkshire and north east England. The service broadcasts seven nights a week from 6:05pm (6pm at the weekend) until midnight. Any local programming, including that for minority communities, is broadcast on MW only with Night Network continuing on FM.
  - The Asian Network launches as a 70 hours-a-week service on the MW transmitters of BBC Radio Leicester and BBC Radio WM.

== 1990s ==
- 1990
  - 17 January – BBC CWR launches.
  - Following BBC Radio 1's final 'borrow' of BBC Radio 2's FM frequencies for the final time, some BBC local radio stations broadcast the Sunday teatime Top 40 programme so that listeners in England where Radio 1 is still only available on MW can continue to hear the programme in stereo. This continues until Radio 1's FM network is available in enough of these areas to make this simulcast no longer necessary.
  - 12 April – BBC Radio Suffolk launches.
  - BBC Radio Northampton is renamed BBC Northampton.
- 1991
  - Spring – The BBC Night Network is expanded to incorporate the BBC's four north west stations. Programmes now start at 7:05pm (7pm at the weekend).
  - 14 November – BBC Radio Surrey launches.
  - BBC Radio Shropshire stops broadcasting on MW.
  - WM Heartlands closes.
  - BBC Radio Furness loses its separate branding but programme opt-outs for the South Lakes and Furness at breakfast and during the afternoon continue.
- 1992
  - 21 February – BBC Radio Berkshire launches, initially as a sister station of Radio Oxford, broadcasting for part of the weekday and weekend mornings.
  - 17 April – BBC Radio Nottingham ends transmissions on one of its MW transmitters. BBC Radio Cleveland, BBC Radio Northampton and BBC Radio Oxford also stop broadcasting on MW in 1992.
  - 1992 sees the BBC World Service start being broadcast on many BBC Local Radio stations when they are not on the air, although most stations in the south and east continue to air BBC Radio 2 during their overnight downtime.
- 1993
  - 5 April – BBC Radio Bedfordshire expands to cover the counties of Buckinghamshire and Hertfordshire and is renamed BBC Three Counties Radio.
  - 26 April – BBC Dorset FM launches as an opt-out service from BBC Radio Devon.
  - Autumn – BBC GLR] and BBC GMR stop broadcasting on MW. Their frequencies are reallocated to commercial radio.
- 1994
  - 7 January – BBC Radio Sussex and BBC Radio Surrey are merged as BBC Radio Sussex and Surrey, although the station had carried this name since the previous September.
  - 18 March – BBC Radio Kent stops broadcasting on 1035kHz MW. The frequency is reallocated to commercial radio.
  - 1 August – BBC Southern Counties Radio launches as the first BBC Local Radio station to adopt an all-speech format. It replaces BBC Radio Sussex and Surrey.
  - The Furness opt-outs for southern Cumbria effectively end after 12 years as a result of cutbacks at the BBC.
- 1995
  - May – BBC CWR closes as a stand-alone station and becomes an opt-out of BBC Radio WM.
- 1996
  - March – BBC Dorset FM closes and is replaced by a rebroadcast of BBC Radio Solent with localised news bulletins.
  - 9 April – BBC Radio Oxford and BBC Radio Berkshire merge to form BBC Thames Valley FM.
  - 4 November – The Asian Network expands into a full-time station when it increases the number of hours on air from 80 hours a week to 126 hours a week (18 hours a day). The station, which broadcasts on the MW frequencies of BBC Radio Leicester and BBC Radio WM, is renamed BBC Asian Network. Consequently, Radios Leicester and WM become available only on FM.
- 1997
  - 1 September – BBC Southern Counties Radio is relaunched. The all-speech format is dropped and the station reverts to a more traditional mix of music and speech.
  - For a brief period in 1997, BBC GMR is renamed GMR Talk.
- 1998
  - BBC Radio 5 Live replaces the BBC World Service as BBC Local Radio's overnight downtime filler.
- 1999
  - No events.

== 2000s ==
- 2000
  - 14 February – BBC Thames Valley FM closes and BBC Radio Oxford and BBC Radio Berkshire relaunch as separate stations although Radio Berkshire operates as an opt-out service of Radio Oxford.
  - 25 March – BBC GLR closes and is relaunched as BBC London Live 94.9. The relaunch sees the station begin 24-hour broadcasting, thereby becoming the first BBC Local station to broadcast around the clock.
  - 3 April – BBC Northampton reverts to its original name of BBC Radio Northampton.
- 2001
  - 1 October
    - BBC London Live changes its name to BBC London 94.9.
    - BBC London 94.9 becomes the first BBC local station to begin live streaming on the internet.
  - October – BBC Three Counties Radio launches opt-out programming for the county of Buckinghamshire.
- 2002
  - 11 November – BBC Radio Swindon launches as an opt-out service from Wiltshire Sound which is renamed BBC Radio Wiltshire.
- 2003
  - No events.
- 2004
  - No events.
- 2005
  - 3 September – BBC Coventry & Warwickshire returns as a stand-alone station after ten years of operating as an opt-out from BBC Radio WM.
  - late 2005 – The switching on of new transmitters at Epping Green and Bedmond extend BBC Three Counties Radio's coverage area to Welwyn Garden City, Hatfield and west Hertfordshire.
- 2006
  - 3 April – BBC GMR changes its name back to BBC Radio Manchester.
- 2007
  - BBC Local Radio introduces BBC Introducing to support local grassroots music.
  - 11 August – BBC Radio Cleveland is rebranded as BBC Tees due to its broadcasting area no longer being associated with the name Cleveland.
  - 3 December – BBC Somerset Sound is rebranded as BBC Somerset and becomes available on FM for the first time.
- 2008
  - No events.
- 2009
  - 30 March – BBC Southern Counties Radio closes resulting in the return of BBC Surrey and BBC Sussex as stand-alone separate stations.
  - 4 April – BBC Radio Swindon, which had opted out of BBC Radio Wiltshire closes. The two stations are merged as BBC Wiltshire.
  - October – As part of a drive to create a more unified sound for BBC Local Radio, a generic jingle package produced by Mcasso Music Production begins to be gradually rolled out across the network.

== 2010s ==
- 2010
  - No events.
- 2011
  - No events.
- 2012
  - April – All BBC local stations are now using the Mcasso Music Production jingle package.
  - May – BBC Somerset launches as a full-time station.
  - 17 August – A five-week trial to find out if listeners will miss or complain about the lack of medium wave services begins when BBC Radio Kent, BBC Radio Lincolnshire, BBC Radio Merseyside and BBC Radio Nottingham stop broadcasting regular programmes on medium wave.
  - 2 October – The BBC decides that BBC Radio Nottingham's MW transmitter and Radio Kent's relay at Rusthall near Tunbridge Wells, will remain off-air after the BBC says that the trial switch-off attracted very few complaints from listeners.
- 2013
  - 5 January – The BBC Local Radio stations begin a new Saturday evening show titled BBC Introducing. Hosted by a local presenter on each station, the programme's aim is to promote musicians from the area.
  - 7 January – The debut of the BBC's networked evening programme takes place, hosted by former Classic FM presenter Mark Forrest. The show replaces all local programming, apart from local sport coverage.
  - 8 July – After eight years, BBC Local Radio returns to Dorset when a breakfast show for the county, as an opt-out from BBC Radio Solent, is launched.
- 2014
  - No events.
- 2015
  - 3 March – Several BBC Local Radio stations are launched on Freeview, with ten of the 40 local stations in England now broadcasting on the platform. They can be found on channels 719 to 722.
  - 6 October – After 27 years, the name BBC Radio London returns to the airwaves following a name change from BBC London 94.9.
- 2016
  - 19 February – BBC Radio Bristol stops broadcasting on MW following the sale of the land, on which the transmitter was located, to developers.
  - 21 June – The BBC completes its roll-out of BBC Local Radio on Freeview.
- 2017
  - 8 October – In a speech marking the 50th anniversary of local radio, The Director-General of the BBC, Tony Hall, announces that the national evening show will be axed, resulting in local programming returning to weeknight evenings.
- 2018
  - 15 January – The MW transmissions of BBC Sussex, BBC Surrey, BBC Radio Humberside, BBC Wiltshire, BBC Radio Nottingham, BBC Radio Kent and BBC Radio Lincolnshire end and MW coverage for BBC Radio Devon, BBC Radio Lancashire and BBC Essex is reduced. Altogether a total of 13 MW transmitters are switched off.
  - Summer – BBC Local Radio stations start reintroducing local weekday evening programmes with all stations broadcasting their own evening output by the end of September.
- 2019
  - No events.

== 2020s ==
- 2020
  - 6 January – The rollout of a new jingle package produced by ReelWorld Europe begins with BBC Radio Leicester.
  - 15 January
    - The BBC announces a further switching off of BBC Local Radio MW transmitters. The switch-offs, being done as a cost-cutting measure, will see the end of MW transmissions of Radios Cornwall, Newcastle, Merseyside, Solent, Solent for Dorset, BBC Three Counties Radio and BBC Radio York. Also, BBC Radio Cumbria will stop broadcasting on MW in Whitehaven and BBC Radio Norfolk's Norwich MW transmitter will go silent. The affected transmitters will broadcast a retune advice loop prior to full switch-off in early April.
    - In a speech in Cardiff, BBC Director-General Tony Hall confirms plans to make major changes to BBC Local Radio.
  - 27 January – BBC Tees is rebranded as BBC Radio Tees.
  - 24 February – BBC Coventry & Warwickshire reverts to the BBC CWR name.
  - 9 March – BBC Wiltshire reverts to BBC Radio Wiltshire.
  - 23 March
    - BBC Newcastle reverts to using the name BBC Radio Newcastle.
    - All BBC Local Radio stations adopt a generic schedule during the COVID-19 pandemic and all specialist shows being taken off air. Each station broadcasts between 6am and 1am and overnight they simulcast BBC Radio London following a decision to suspend overnight programmes on BBC Radio 5 Live so that the BBC can broadcast a single UK-wide overnight programme.
  - 28 March – As part of the BBC's Make a Difference campaign, BBC Local Radio announces that it has teamed up with manufacturers, retailers and the social isolation charity WaveLength to give away free DAB radios to vulnerable people over the age of 70, beginning on 30 March.
  - 30 March – BBC Sussex and BBC Surrey revert to the names BBC Radio Sussex and BBC Radio Surrey respectively.
  - 27 April – BBC Somerset is rebranded as BBC Radio Somerset.
  - 11 May – BBC WM 95.6 reverts to BBC Radio WM.
  - 2 July – The BBC announces that the changes that were introduced during the Coronavirus outbreak are to become permanent as part of a bid to save £25m by 2022.
  - 6 July – BBC Local Radio stations revert to broadcasting BBC Radio 5 Live during most of their overnight downtime although BBC Radio London is broadcast on all stations between 5am and 6am.
  - 26 November – BBC Local Radio scraps plans to introduce a syndicated late show.
  - 7 December – BBC Radio Bradford launches as a four-month temporary station, broadcasting on the MW frequency of BBC Radio Leeds each weekday between 6am and 2pm.
- 2021
  - 15 January – Launch of BBC Radio Wolverhampton on DAB, a station broadcasting to Wolverhampton between 6am and 2pm.
  - 18 January – Launch of BBC Radio Sunderland, on DAB, a station broadcasting to Sunderland between 6am and 2pm.
  - 31 March – BBC Radio Bradford, BBC Radio Wolverhampton and BBC Radio Sunderland stop broadcasting.
  - 2 April – BBC Local Radio launches Squad Goals, a non-terrestrial service providing football updates and information that airs while local stations are providing match coverage for which they only have terrestrial broadcasting rights, it replaces a looped message telling listeners on Freeview, BBC Sounds and smart devices they are unable to listen to live football because of rights issues.
  - 15 April – The BBC confirms that a further eight BBC Local Radio stations will switch off their MW frequencies during May and June 2021. The stations that will no longer be available on AM are BBC Essex, BBC Radio Cambridgeshire, BBC Radio Devon, BBC Radio Leeds, BBC Radio Sheffield, BBC Hereford & Worcester, BBC Radio Stoke and BBC Radio Lancashire.
  - 19 April – BBC Local Radio announces the launch of its "Make a Difference – Back to Business" initiative to support England's arts sector.
  - 10 May – BBC Radio Cambridgeshire stops broadcasting on MW.
  - 13 May – BBC Radio Hereford & Worcester stops broadcasting on MW.
  - 17 May – BBC Radio Lancashire stops broadcasting on MW.
  - 20 May – BBC Essex stops broadcasting on MW.
  - 24 May – BBC Radio Stoke stops broadcasting on MW.
  - 27 May – BBC Radio Sheffield stops broadcasting on MW.
  - 1 June – BBC Radio Leeds stops broadcasting on MW.
  - 7 June – BBC Radio Gloucestershire stops broadcasting on MW to the Stow-on-the-Wold area, but its other MW transmission continues to operate.
  - 1 August – BBC Radio Guernsey and BBC Radio Jersey are now available on DAB+ as well as BBC Radio Guernsey Xtra and BBC Radio Jersey Xtra which is a relay of the medium wave service with coverage of the States Assembly.
  - 3 August – BBC Radio Devon stops broadcasting on MW.
  - 1 December – The switching on of local multiplexes for north Cumbria and south Cumbria/north Lancashire results in BBC Radio Cumbria commencing broadcasting on DAB. Consequently, for the first time, all 39 Local BBC Radio stations are now broadcast on DAB.
- 2022
  - 31 October – Major cutbacks to BBC Local Radio are announced. Stations will only be local from 6am until 2pm on weekdays with all other programming, apart from live sport, being broadcast on neighbouring stations. The cuts will also see the return of a fully networked weeknight show, airing from 10pm. There is significant opposition to these proposals, including from within Parliament when a group of 26 MPs representing constituencies in Yorkshire write to the BBC Director-General, Tim Davie, to express their concerns about the proposed cuts to BBC Local Radio.
- 2023
  - 25 September – Regional programme sharing begins. BBC Radio Bristol, BBC Radio Somerset, BBC Radio Gloucestershire and BBC Radio Wiltshire become the first stations to begin sharing content. The following months see regional programme sharing being rolled across all of England.
  - 8 October – The first edition of the England-wide networked BBC Local Radio late night show is broadcast. Becky Want presents Sunday to Thursday and Jo Good hosts Fridays and Saturdays.
  - 12 November – England-wide programming expands further when a new national programme, presented by Dotun Adebayo, launches. It broadcasts on all BBC Local Radio stations each Sunday between 6pm and 10pm, replacing regional and local programmes which had previous been aired on Sunday evenings.
- 2024
  - No events.
- 2025
  - 14 September – England-wide programming expands further into Sundays with the launch of Make a Difference, airing between 2pm and 6pm. It replaces a number of regional Sunday afternoon music programmes. Stations will opt out of the programme for local sport commentaries to ensure that the current level of local sports coverage is maintained.
  - 15 October – The BBC asks Ofcom to change its quota for locally produced programming for BBC Local Radio.
- 2026
  - 31 March – BBC Radio Guernsey and BBC Radio Jersey stop broadcasting on MW.
  - 24 September – BBC Local Radio proposes the merger of further programming, including a joint weekday late show produced with BBC Radio 5 Live that could begin from April 2027.
  - November – BBC Local Radio will complete its withdrawal from MW broadcasting when the final five stations which still have MW transmissions – BBC Radio Cumbria, BBC Radio Derby, BBC Radio Gloucestershire, BBC Radio Norfolk (in West Norfolk) and BBC Radio Somerset stop broadcasting on MW.
- 2027
  - January – Six regional programmes currently broadcast on Tuesdays and Wednesdays are planned to end, a new all England sports-focused early breakfast programme from 6am to 8am is planned, with the Saturday local breakfast show moving to the later slot of 8am to 12noon, and the number of faith-focused Sunday breakfast programmes are planned to reduce to six, with gardening filling the programme's final hour.
  - April – BBC Local plans to end its current late programme by this month as part of changes aimed at delivering £9m in savings. The current 10pm to 1am programme would be replaced by a new weekday speech programme developed with BBC Radio 5 Live, which would air on BBC Local Radio alongside 5 Live’s existing weekend Late Show.

== See also ==
- Timeline of BBC Radio London
