= Bill Buckley (radio presenter) =

British radio presenter (born 1959)

- Born: William Anthony Buckley; 8 January 1959 (age 67); Burton-on-Trent, Staffordshire, England
- Presenting career
- Show: Bill Buckley
- Network: BBC Radio Berkshire
- Style: Talk radio/Phone-in
- Country: England
- Previous shows: LBC; BBC Southern Counties Radio
- Website: billbuckley.net

William Anthony Buckley (born 8 January 1959) is a radio and television presenter and former actor. For three years, he was a co-presenter of BBC Television's consumer affairs programme That's Life!. His career on BBC Radio finished at BBC Radio Berkshire. He has presented shows on BBC Radio Berkshire, BBC Radio Solent, BBC Southern Counties Radio, BBC Radio Devon, BBC Radio Oxford, London talk radio station LBC 97.3, BBC London 94.9 and other radio stations.

== Early life ==
Buckley was born in Burton upon Trent in Staffordshire on 8 January 1959.

== Career ==
Buckley's broadcasting career began in 1982. While working as a newspaper reporter in his native West Midlands, he was chosen from thousands of hopefuls to present the consumer programme That's Life! on BBC1 alongside Esther Rantzen. His mother had entered him for the job without his knowing.

After three years, he left That's Life! to become a reporter for the BBC's Holiday programme, and spent the next six years travelling the world. Other TV appearances include Call My Bluff, Blankety Blank, All Star Secrets, Songs of Praise, Children in Need, and a variety of regional work in the south for Meridian Television on subjects as diverse as consumer affairs, politics and amateur film-making.

From 1989, he has also presented daily radio shows for numerous commercial and BBC stations in the South, the Midlands, London, Manchester, and Plymouth.

Buckley's acting experience includes playing Joseph in Joseph and the Amazing Technicolour Dreamcoat at Leatherhead. He also toured in the black comedy Widow's Weeds, and starred in numerous pantomimes, playing King in Jack and the Beanstalk at the Theatre Royal, Brighton. He was also an extra in the Birmingham-based soap opera Crossroads. On hearing of the sacking of one of the programme's leading cast members, Noele Gordon, Buckley led a campaign outside the studios of Crossroads producer ATV in Birmingham, demanding her reinstatement, and performed a protest song entitled "Meg is Magic". The song, which was composed by Buckley, was soon launched as a record. He also provided the words and music for Su Pollard's number two hit single "Starting Together", which was the signature tune for the BBC Television documentary The Marriage in 1986. Pollard's album, Su, released the same year, featured another Buckley composition, "Falling For You".

Beginning at the television channel's launch in 1997, Buckley was for five-and-a-half years senior continuity announcer for Channel 5. He became well known for his commentary over the closing credits of the channel's late-night/early-morning run of Prisoner: Cell Block H, on which he read out viewers' letters and made comments about the episode just broadcast.

Buckley regularly reviewed the national newspapers on BBC Breakfast, the BBC News Channel and Sky News.

=== Radio career ===
Buckley began his radio career presenting and producing the lunchtime show on BBC Radio Solent in Southampton in 1989. He was poached by the new, commercial rival South Coast Radio in 1991. The first of his two stints at London's LBC followed in 1994. Buckley has presented various programmes on BBC Local Radio, including many overnight shows on BBC Radio London 94.9FM. Over Christmas and New Year 2009–10, Buckley filled in on BBC Radio London and BBC Radios Solent, Sussex, Surrey, Kent, Berkshire and Oxford. He presented the lunchtime show on BBC Radio Leicester, weekdays noon to 2 pm, from 15 March 2010 until 17 September 2010. From January 2011 until September 2011, he was the host of BBC Berkshire's lunchtime slot show. Buckley was also BBC London 94.9's food and drink correspondent, guesting every Wednesday night on The Late Show with Joanne Good until early 2011. Until May 2013, Buckley presented his own Sunday show on BBC Radio Oxford from 12 pm till 2 pm, solving listeners' gardening problems, and talking about the best food and drink in Oxfordshire. Buckley presented full-time on BBC Radio Devon based in Plymouth until moving back to present the 1 pm till 4 pm slot on BBC Radio Berkshire in April 2016.

==== LBC ====
Buckley filled in for many of LBC 97.3's presenters for several years, and also regularly hosted a weekend night-time slot. In May 2007 his show shifted to Tuesday, Wednesday, Thursday and Friday mornings from 1 am until 5 am. Buckley began presenting LBC's Sunday afternoon Food and Drink programme in January 2008.

Buckley announced that he was stepping down from the overnight show from early September 2009 due to the unsociable hours, but intended to continue his Sunday food and drink programme. He presented what was scheduled to be his penultimate programme in the morning of Tuesday 8 September, with the intention of presenting his final programme the following morning. However, his photograph was removed from station's website on Tuesday, and it was announced that the overnight slot would be presented by someone else. His name was also removed from the Food and Drink show's description.

=== Cookery ===
In September 2005, Buckley appeared on, and won, Come Dine with Me. He previously cooked on the Carlton Food Network and, live, on Channel 5 on Open House with Gloria Hunniford. Buckley has also appeared as a judge on three series of ITV1's Britain's Best Dish and UKTV Food's The People's Cookbook with Antony Worrall Thompson and Paul Rankin. He has been food editor of BBC Southern Counties magazine and was elected to the prestigious Guild of Food Writers. In 2008, Buckley replaced Loyd Grossman on Ten Minutes to Table, co-presenting with Xanthe Clay, for Telegraph TV. He has judged the Academy of Chocolate Awards, Great Taste Awards and World Cheese Awards. Buckley is a restaurant reviewer for View London.

== Personal life ==
Buckley is openly gay, and entered into a civil partnership in August 2011. In a radio interview with BBC Radio Berkshire's Anne Diamond on 12 August of that year, he talked about how he came out to his parents, how they reacted and how he attempted suicide. Buckley is also a member of Mensa.
