= Reigate transmitting station =

Reigate
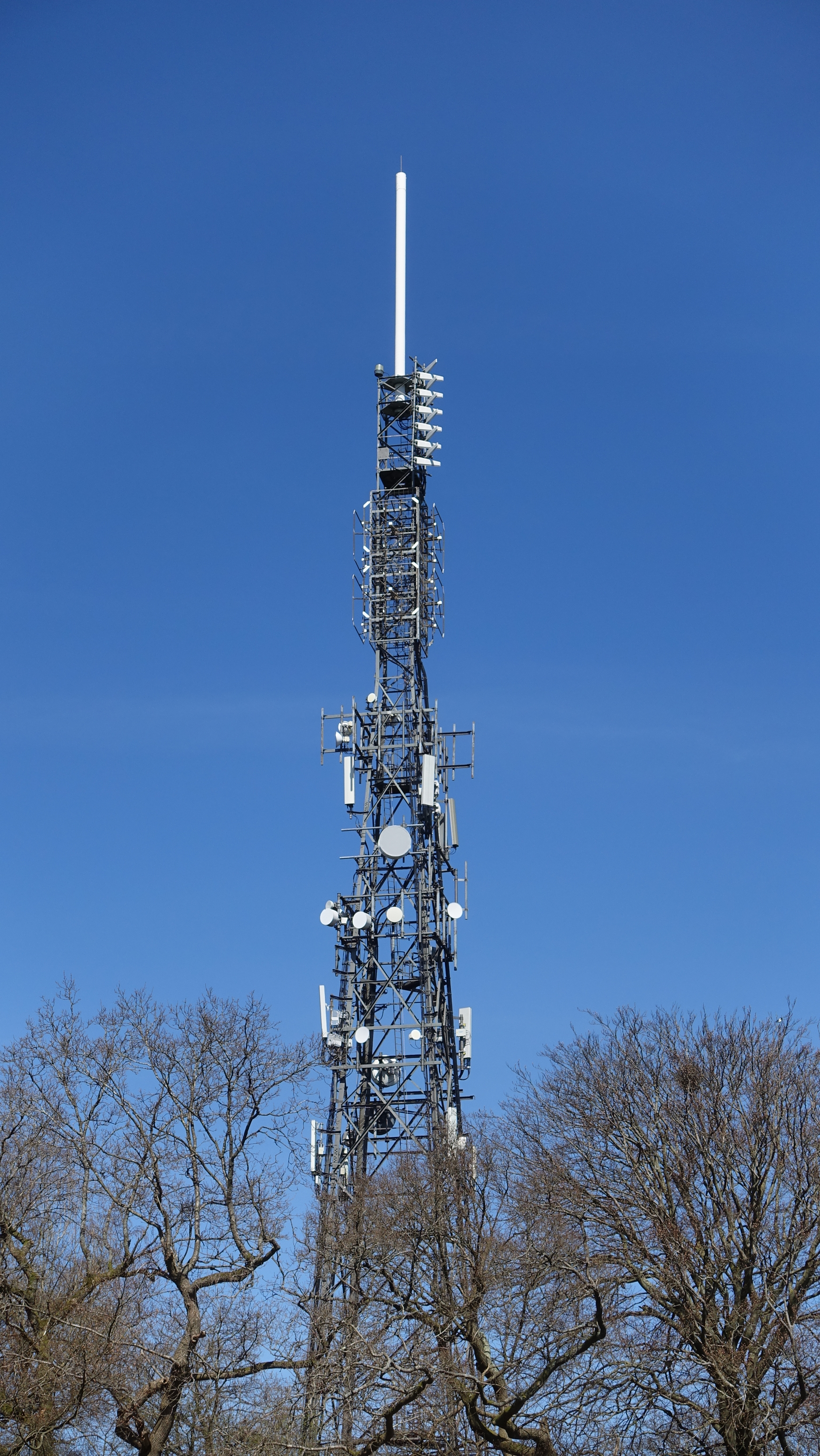
- Reigate Mast, April 2021

- Location within Surrey
- Tower height: 64.3 metres (211 ft)
- Coordinates: 51.25417°N 0.2°W
- Grid reference: TQ256521
- Built: 24 October 1966
- BBC region: BBC London
- ITV region: ITV London
- Digital switchover: 18 April 2012

Reigate transmitting station is a television and radio transmitting tower in southeastern England. It is located on the North Downs at Reigate Hill about one mile (1.6 km) north of the town of Reigate at junction 8 of the M25 motorway where it intersects with the A217 road. Another telecommunications tower is located adjacent to the Reigate broadcasting tower, both sites are owed and operated by Arqiva.

The station was primarily built to provide uhf television to the towns of Reigate, Redhill and Crawley which are screened from the London transmitter at Crystal Palace by the North Downs. However, from its high position on Reigate Hill (site height 226 metres (741 ft)) the transmitter provides secondary coverage to a large area of south Surrey and northern areas of West Sussex.

The original tower built in 1966 was some 46m in height. In the late 1990s with the need to add additional services to the tower, such as digital radio, the tower was replaced with a new structure some 18m taller.

== History ==
=== Television ===
When the station was brought into service on 24 October 1966 it only carried BBC Two which had started two years earlier in April 1964 transmitted on the UHF frequency band in 625 lines. The BBC One 625 line colour service was added in September 1970 and ITV a year later in October 1971. Channel 4 was added to the station in February 1985 and when Channel 5 was added in September 2003 it marked the culmination of analogue television expansion at the station.

The Reigate transmitter was included in the roll-out of the first 81 transmitters to carry the UK digital terrestrial television service when it was launched in the UK. The service from the transmitter officially began in September 1999. Six digital multiplex signals were transmitted at low power from the station in addition to the four existing analogue television services. When the Channel 5 analogue service was added in 2003 it brought total number of television signals transmitted from the station to eleven.

On 18 April 2012 all the analogue television services at Reigate transmitter were switched off as part of the UK Digital Switch Over project. Three of the frequencies that had been used for the analogue service were transferred to the digital television service while the highest frequency above 800MHz was released for use by mobile 4G services. All six digital television transmissions were increased in power to 2 kW.

In 2014 the UK telecommunications regulatory Ofcom decided that the 700 MHz band should be cleared of digital television to be used for mobile broadband services by the summer of 2020. As a result, on 21 March 2018 three of digital television signals transmitted from Reigate were moved in frequency to lower frequency channels.

On 16 October 2019 the local television multiplex entered service at the transmitter. It operates as a single-frequency network with the Crystal Palace and Croydon transmitters.

=== Radio ===
==== VHF/FM radio ====
Mercury FM, the Independent Local Radio station for East Surrey and North Sussex, was transmitted from the Reigate transmitter from its launch on 20 October 1984 at 103.6 MHz. In October 1985 as part of the reorganisation of FM broadcasting in the UK the frequency was changed to 102.7Mz. In July 2010 Mercury FM became part of the Heart Network and the service was changed to Heart Sussex and Surrey.

The Reigate transmitter also started to carry the BBC Sussex local radio station in the autumn of 1984 to extend coverage of the station to the Crawley area of West Sussex. The service was initially transmitted on 102.7 MHz, but with the reorganisation of the FM broadcasting band it was moved to 104 MHz in October 1985. In September 1997 the service began to carry the Surrey feed of the station, which had become known as BBC Southern Counties Radio in 1994, in order to better reflect the location of the transmitter. This is now known as BBC Radio Surrey.

==== Digital Radio ====
When the BBC launched its Digital Radio national service on 27 September 1995 the Reigate transmitter was included in the network to strengthen coverage in South London, East Surrey and North Sussex. The first national commercial network, Digital One, was added to the transmitter on 23 September 1999 and a second national commercial network, Sound Digital on 29 February 2016.

In addition to the 3 national networks, the three London local digital radio services were added as they launched: London 1 on 13 June 2000 (CE Digital), London 2 (Switch London) on 23 November 2000 and London 3 (DRG London) on 18 January 2002. On 12 December 2013 a local digital radio service for Surrey was added by MuxCo.

== Services currently transmitted ==
=== Digital television ===
Frequency	UHF	kW	Operator	System
474.000 MHz	21	2	COM4 (SDN)	DVB-T
490.000 MHz	23	2	PSB1 (BBC A)	DVB-T
498.000 MHz	24	2	COM5 (ARQ A)	DVB-T
514.000 MHz	26	2	PSB2 (D3&4)	DVB-T
522.000 MHz	27	2	COM6 (ARQ B)	DVB-T
546.000 MHz	30	2	PSB3 (BBC B)	DVB-T2
586.000 MHz	35	0.2	LTVmux	DVB-T

=== Analogue radio ===
Frequency	kW	Service
102.7 MHz	3.6 kW	Heart South (FM)
104.0 MHz	4 kW	BBC Radio Surrey (FM)

=== Digital radio ===
Frequency	Block	kW	Operator
213.360 MHz	10C	1	MuxCoSurrey
216.928 MHz	11A	1	Sound Digital
218.640 MHz	11B	0.4	London 3 (DRG London)
222.064 MHz	11D	1	Digital One
223.936 MHz	12A	1.51	London 2 (Switch London)
225.648 MHz	12B	1	BBC National DAB
227.360 MHz	12C	1.2	London 1 (CE Digital)

== Services no longer transmitted ==
=== Digital Television ===
==== Digital television 1998 to 2012 ====
Frequency	UHF	kW	Operator	System
474.000 MHz	21	0.2	Mux 2 (D3&4)	DVB-T
498.000 MHz	24	0.2	Mux A (SDN)	DVB-T
522.000 MHz	27	0.2	Mux B (BBC B)	DVB-T
554.000 MHz	31	0.2	Mux 1 (BBC A)	DVB-T
618.000 MHz	39	0.1	Mux C (ARQ A)	DVB-T
834.000 MHz	66	0.1	Mux D (ARQ B)	DVB-T

==== Digital television 2012 to 2018 ====
Frequency	UHF	kW	Operator	System
474.000 MHz	21	2	COM4 (SDN)	DVB-T
498.000 MHz	24	2	COM5 (ARQ A)	DVB-T
522.000 MHz	27	2	COM6 (ARQ B)	DVB-T
730.000 MHz	53	2	PSB3 (BBC B)	DVB-T2
762.000 MHz	57	2	PSB2 (D3&4)	DVB-T
786.000 MHz	60	2	PSB1 (BBC A)	DVB-T

=== Analogue television ===
Analogue television transmissions were turned off in two stages—on 4 April 2012 and 18 April 2012.

Frequency	UHF	kW	Service
639.25 MHz	42	5	Channel 5
727.25 MHz	53	10	Channel 4
759.25 MHz	57	10	BBC One
783.25 MHz	60	10	ITV London
807.25 MHz	63	10	BBC Two
