= Georgia Wonder =

British folk-rock duo

- Stephanie Grant, vocals - Julian Moore, music

Background information
- Origin: UK
- Genres: Folk-rock
- Years active: 2002 - present
- Labels: Self released
- Members: Stephanie Grant (vocals); Julian Moore (music)
- Website: Georgia Wonder Website

Georgia Wonder is a British folk-rock duo consisting of vocalist Stephanie Grant and musician Jullan Moore.

== History ==
=== Awards and achievements ===
Their song "Girl You Never Knew", taken from their debut Hello Stranger EP was named “Song Of The Day” by Popjustice on 6 August 2008 who said it was "one Grey's Anatomy soundtrack appearance away from being an international hit single."

It also claimed “Song Of The Day” on 29 August 2008 and “Song Of The Week” for the week of 29 August on the Record Of The Day website, who called it "a simple, restrained, haunting ballad which sounds classic but not dated".

=== Radio ===
Georgia Wonder’s debut BBC radio broadcast was on "whispering" Bob Harris's BBC Radio 2 show on 27 January 2007 when he played the track ‘Hello Stranger’. He followed this up by playing their unreleased track ‘Two Weeks To Live’ during the following show on 3 February 2007.

They have also performed live on BBC Radio Solent and BBC Southern Counties Radio.

=== Tours and appearances ===
Georgia Wonder supported Simply Red’s Mick Hucknall on the UK leg of his 2008 tour, and performed at the London American Embassy on US election night 2008. They also played at the American Ambassador's house in Regent's Park, London for Independence Day celebrations 2009.

=== Other ===
In January 2009, Georgia Wonder released their EP, Hello Stranger, onto file sharing sites and quickly entered the top twenty "most shared" songs on The Pirate Bay.

They were nominated for an Interactive Music Award for their 'Hello Stranger' CD campaign in 2009.

Georgia Wonder disbanded sometime after the release of Made in Nevada.

== Discography ==
=== EPs ===
- Hello Stranger (2008)
1. "Girl You Never Knew"
2. "Hello Stranger"
3. "Falling Down"
4. "Would Love To Meet"
5. "Carnival"
- Destroy (2009)
1. "Destroy"
2. "Two Weeks To Live"
3. "Genius"
4. "Cool Again"
5. "Love About You
- Made in Nevada (2010)
1. "No Credit"
2. "Siren"
3. "Unknown Legend"
4. "Fly"
5. "Follow The Light'
