= Robert Anwood =

British author

Robert Anwood is the pseudonym of the author of the humour book Bears Can't Run Downhill. It was followed by a sequel in September 2007, Emus Can't Walk Backwards. A third book, Damp Squids & Card Sharks, was announced for publication in October 2023.

Writes for the web under the pen name of Siegfried Baboon.

As of October 2007, Robert Anwood appeared as a character called "Fact Man" on Lorna Milton's afternoon show on BBC Three Counties Radio.

Anwood has been the keyboard player for Oxford-based indie band Jody and the Jerms since 2019.
