= Local radio =

Local radio can refer to:

- Community radio
- Low-power broadcasting
- Pirate radio

In the UK:

- BBC Local Radio
- Independent Local Radio

In Australia:

- ABC Local Radio by the Australian Broadcasting Corporation
