= Robert Gunnell =

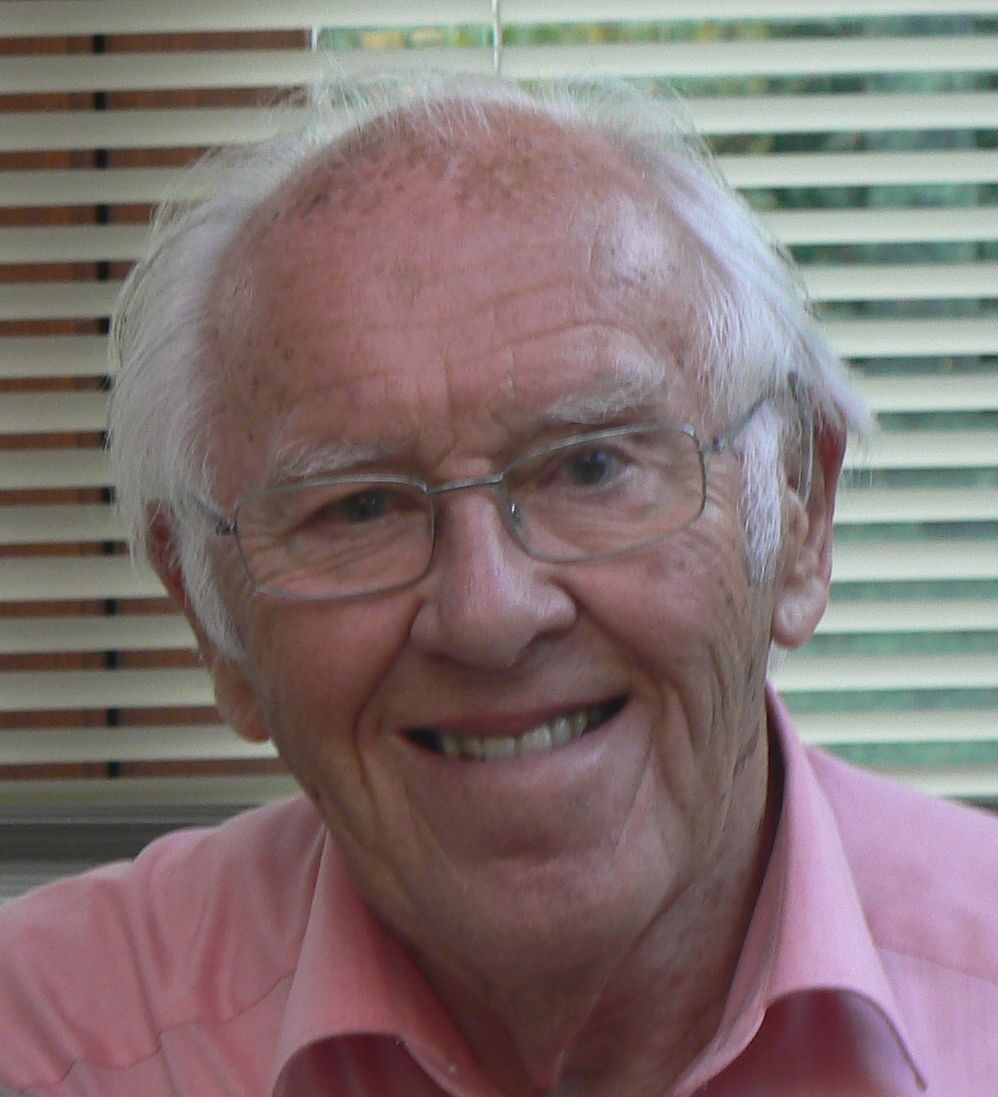
Robert Gunnell

Robert "Bob" Gunnell (2 March 1927 – 19 April 2014) was a broadcaster and a central figure in the cultural life of Brighton and Hove.

In 1967, Gunnell was appointed founder manager of BBC Radio Brighton, one of the first experimental local radio stations to be opened by the BBC. His belief was that the local community should play a central role in the running, interests and regional character of this station.

Already active in other areas of community life after having helped organise the Goldstone Valley Residents’ Association and having served as an Independent member of Hove Borough Council, Gunnell went on to serve as a local magistrate, in the 1970s being elected Chairman of the Brighton Philharmonic Society. He played an active role in the East Sussex branch of the Arts Council, later going on to become founder chairman of the Brighton and Hove Arts Council in 1974. He later served as President of the local Arts Council for much of the rest of his life, during which time he helped develop the Brighton Festival.

Following on from his retirement from the BBC in 1982, Gunnell lectured in radio techniques at various colleges in Redhill and Portsmouth, assisting Brighton Technical College with the establishment of courses on radio techniques and journalism. After full retirement, he continued making radio programmes that now focused on the interests of the older members of the local community. He also became Chairman of the Brighton and Hove U3A, and was elected council representative for the Patcham and Withdean wards of the Older People's Council.

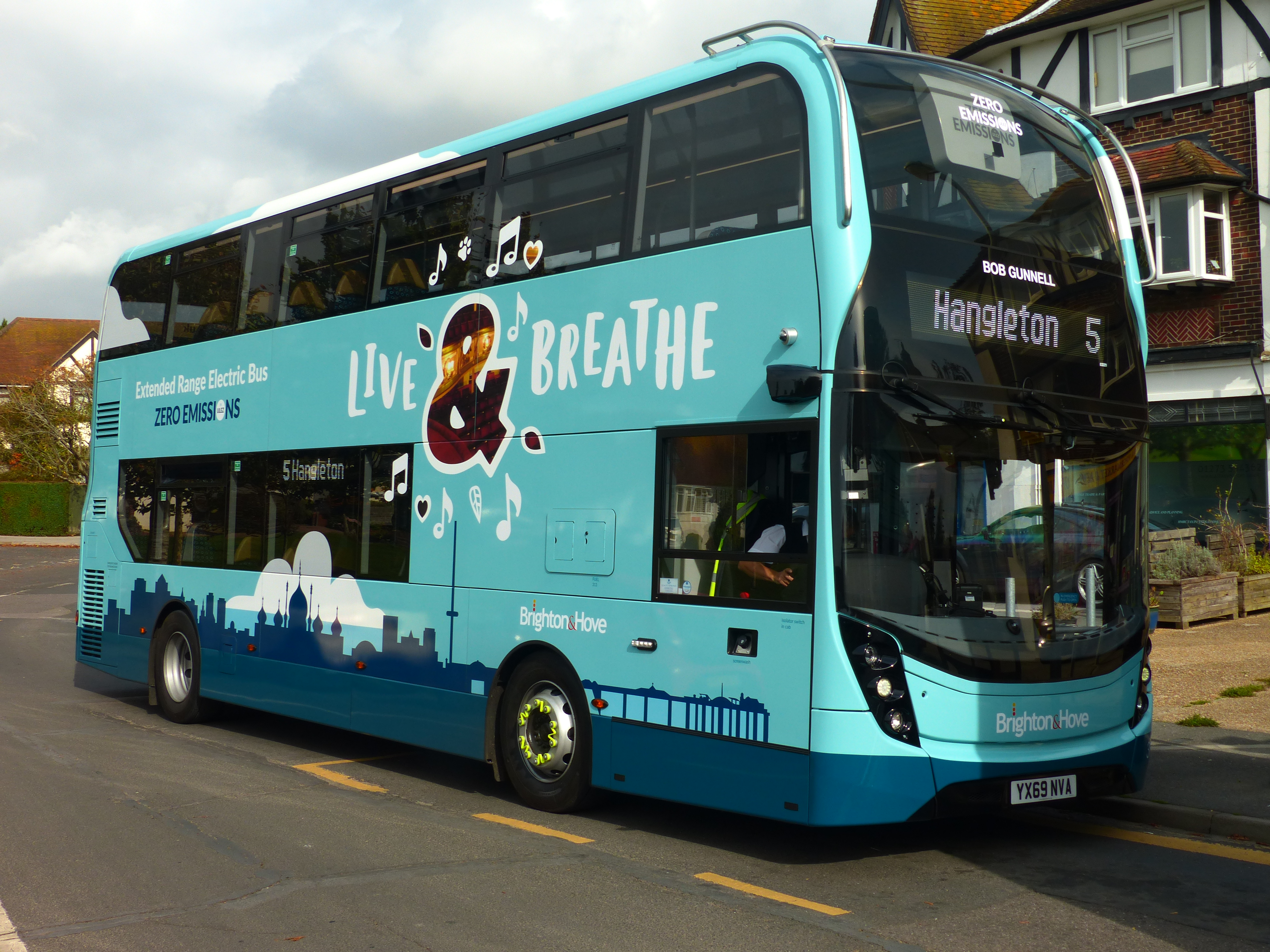
Bob Gunnell named bus
