= BBC English Regions =

Division for local and regional services

- TV transmitters: Terrestrial, cable and BBC UK regional TV on satellite
- Radio stations: BBC Local Radio
- Headquarters: The Mailbox, Birmingham
- Nation: England; Guernsey; Isle of Man; Jersey
- Regions: BBC East; BBC East Midlands; BBC London; BBC North East and Cumbria; BBC North West; BBC South; BBC South East; BBC South West; BBC West; BBC West Midlands; BBC Yorkshire; BBC Yorkshire and Lincolnshire
- Parent: BBC
- Key people: Helen Thomas, Director of BBC England (2018–present)
- Official website: www.bbc.co.uk/england
- Notes

BBC English Regions is the division of the BBC responsible for local and regional television, radio, web, and teletext services in England, the Isle of Man, and the Channel Islands. It is one of the BBC's four "nations" – the others being BBC Cymru Wales, BBC Northern Ireland, and BBC Scotland.

The division is made up of 12 regions. Many of the names of these regions are similar to those of the official government Regions of England, but the areas covered are often significantly different, being determined by terrestrial transmission coverage rather than administrative boundaries.

BBC English Regions has its headquarters at The Mailbox in Birmingham (West Midlands) and additional regional television centres in Norwich, Nottingham, Broadcasting House (London), Newcastle, MediaCityUK (Salford), Southampton, Tunbridge Wells, Plymouth, Bristol, Leeds and Kingston upon Hull, as well as local radio stations based at 43 locations across England.

Overall, the division produces over 70% of the BBC's domestic television and radio output hours, for about 7% of the licence fee.

Since April 2009, the English Regions division has been aligned with the BBC News department to "maximise co-operation in the BBC's news operations".

== History ==
=== The four regions ===
The current BBC English Regions division was the product of the controversial Broadcasting in the Seventies report – a radical review of the BBC's network radio and non-metropolitan broadcasting structure – published on 10 July 1969.

Before this the structure of regional broadcasting in England had remained virtually unchanged since the late 1920s, when the establishment of four regional radio transmission stations covering England had led to a regional structure on similar lines. BBC North was based in Manchester and covered the area from Cheshire and Sheffield northwards, BBC Midlands and East Anglia was based in Birmingham covering a swathe of central England from the Potteries to Norfolk, and BBC South and West was based in Bristol covering the area south and west of a line from Gloucester to Brighton. The London area, though it had regional transmission infrastructure of its own, produced only national programming and wasn't considered to be a region as it acted as the sustaining service for the other regions.

These regions (alongside the national regions BBC Scotland, BBC Cymru Wales and BBC Northern Ireland that performed a similar role outside England) were well-suited to delivering the pre-war BBC Regional Programme and the post-war BBC Home Service that replaced it. By the 1960s, though, the growth of television, the birth of the more locally based ITV franchises in 1955 and the development of smaller BBC Local Radio stations (made possible by the development of FM radio) were making the structure look increasingly anachronistic.

=== Broadcasting in the Seventies ===
Previous BBC English Regions logo

The effect of Broadcasting in the Seventies was to separate the two different roles of regional BBC offices into different organisations:

- The two major television channels BBC1 and BBC2 were to remain primarily national operations. To prevent this leading to total domination by London, three large Network Production Centres (NPC), each one having its own medium-size colour TV studio – BBC Bristol, BBC Birmingham and BBC Manchester – were established in the headquarters of the former regions, to produce programming for national broadcast across the entire United Kingdom.

Each of the production centres also had network radio studios (BBC Birmingham, for instance, producing The Archers) plus a small television news studio, the latter to enable local (opt out) programming.

- BBC English Regions was created to take on this other role of the former regions – the production of specifically local programming (mainly from small island sites) – through a new tier of eight much smaller regions described on page eight of the report as "the basic unit of English broadcasting outside London" and controlled from headquarters in the newly built Pebble Mill studios in Birmingham.

As a result of the latter, Plymouth-based BBC South West and Southampton-based BBC South were split from BBC West in Bristol; Norwich-based BBC East separated from BBC Midlands in Birmingham; a new smaller BBC North West was created from the existing Manchester-based region, with the old BBC North name being taken by the newly created region based in Leeds; and the existing Newcastle-based BBC North East separated from the old BBC North Region in this process.

In addition, London and the surrounding area was finally recognised as a region with the creation of BBC South East although the region was not to get a dedicated regional programme of its own until 1982 and regional news bulletins for the area did not launch until September 1985.

These new regions produced local news programmes and opt-outs on television, but regional radio programming on the BBC Home Service was to be replaced by BBC Local Radio. The report stated that the local radio experiment, started in 1967 "has proved that there is a demand for local radio" and that the BBC should "put forward to the Postmaster General a provisional scheme for expanding our local network to about forty stations".

=== Current structure ===
Map of the BBC English regions

This structure has largely survived since the 1970s. Local news services were developed on Ceefax from 1997 and were extended onto the web in 1999. The decreasing costs of television production and improving technology also enabled the gradual development of even smaller regions. In 1991, BBC East Midlands was finally created in Nottingham, BBC London (separated from BBC South East) became a region in 2001 and BBC North was split into BBC Yorkshire and BBC Yorkshire and Lincolnshire in 2004 – with the new millennium seeing several BBC regions moving into new premises. In the East, South and South West regions, sub-regional opt-outs during local news programmes have also been created (similar to those on ITV regional news programmes), based respectively in Cambridge, Oxford and Jersey. In total, the BBC has produced the regional news bulletins for London, the East, South East, South, South West, West, the West and East Midlands, and the North West regions of England, with the Look North branding for Yorkshire, East Yorkshire and Lincolnshire and the North East and Cumbria, with national bulletins for Scotland, Wales and Northern Ireland. All follow the national UK-wide BBC News bulletins.

In May 2022 the BBC announced the cessation of the Cambridge and Oxford sub-regional television news bulletins as part of plans to move to a digital-first BBC. The last bulletins aired at 18:30 on 16 December 2022.

== Programmes ==
Since 2022, outside of news and a weekly political programme, regional programmes in England are no longer broadcast by the BBC, apart from the very occasional ad-hoc programme.

=== We Are England ===
We Are England

In 2022, a new regional documentary strand titled We Are England was launched, as a replacement for the current affairs show Inside Out. A notable change is that episodes represent large, new, combinations of English regions, based in six main bases (Birmingham, Bristol, Leeds, London, Newcastle and Norwich); each week is themed around a different subtitle, with the first being Mental Health.

Aisling O'Connor, the head of TV Commissioning for BBC England, commissioned 120 episodes to be broadcast in 2022, with the first being shown on 26 January 2022 at 7:30pm. In-addition to being shown on BBC One, select episodes are also repeated on BBC News and on BBC Three.

In May 2022, the BBC announced a raft of closures, restructures and cost-cutting measures and one of these was the decision not to renew We Are England for a third series.

== See also ==
- Audience Council England
- Home Service – Regions
- List of BBC regional news programmes
