= Gordon Astley =

British radio presenter

Gordon Astley (born 1 December 1948, Lytham St. Annes, Lancashire) is a British radio presenter. He is best known for his role a presenter on BBC Southern Counties Radio, which he left in February 2009 after almost 15 years.

He was also presenter on the final series of the children's show Tiswas in 1982 alongside Sally James. Although brought in to replace former chief presenter Chris Tarrant, who had left to present O.T.T., Astley himself said he was there to take over James's old role.

He has also been on various radio stations in the Midlands. He was the breakfast presenter at Mercia Sound in Coventry when it launched in 1980 and he was also a presenter at Beacon Radio and BBC Radio WM, where he presented the Weekday Mid-Morning show until September 1994, when he first joined BBC Southern Counties Radio. He also presented a magic and mindreading show in Atlanta, Georgia

He made a brief return to the Midlands in the late 1990s, when he took over the late night show on BBC Radio WM. This was carried on various BBC Local Radio stations in the Midlands.

He has been a radio presenter both in Britain and America for over thirty years. Other credits include being a regular panelist on Cheggers Plays Pop in the late seventies, Play Away, Play School and It's a Knockout. He is also a motivational speaker, professional magician and a member of The Magic Circle.
