= John Radford (wine writer) =

British wine and food writer and broadcaster

John Radford (1 December 1946 – 19 October 2012) was a British writer and broadcaster in the field of wine and food, with an emphasis on Spain.

== Career ==
Radford was born in Nottingham, and educated at Stamford School in Lincolnshire. After a background in the food and drink industry and retail, his writing career started with children's comics, principally for the Dundee publishing house of D. C. Thomson & Co., with Judy comic for girls, for which he wrote a good deal of the annuals from 1978 to 1985 as well as the weekly paper. He also wrote for the same publisher's science fiction series Starblazer, and contributed to other publications, including a series of stories about Dixon Hawke the Dover Street Detective for the Dundee Sporting Post.

He began lecturing about wine whilst in the wine trade, from 1975, and started writing about wine from 1977. His first regular column was in 1981 in the Coventry Evening Telegraph and this was subsequently syndicated to local dailies around the UK. He also contributed wine articles to Decanter Magazine from 1985, as well as writing general features for regional and county glossies and business magazines.

As a result of his perceived interest in Spain, he was commissioned by ICEX, the Spanish Embassy Commercial Office in London, to write the trade/press textbook for Spanish wines The Spanish Wine Education Notes, which appeared bi-annually from 1989 to 2001, after which ICEX took it in-house and it went online.

In 1997 he was commissioned by the publisher Mitchell Beazley to write a new and definitive consumer guide to Spanish wines – The New Spain. Since then his books have a won a number of international awards. The New Spain (1998) won the Glenfiddich "Drinks Book of the year" and the Prix de Champagne Lanson "European Wine Book of the year" awards, as well as 'Best European Wine Book' at the Livre Gourmand Awards in Versailles, and was awarded the silver medal of the Gastronomische Akademie Deutschland. His 2004 book The Wines of Rioja also won the Livre Gourmand award for "Best European Wine Book". In 2006 he was awarded the Premio Especial Alimentos de España in Madrid for his continuing work on Spanish food and wine, and he is a member of the Gran Orden de Caballeros del Vino. His most recent book Cook España, Drink España, written in collaboration with chef Mario Sandoval of Restaurante Coque in Humanes de Madrid was published in October 2007. In November it won the Livre Gourmand Award 2008 for 'Best European Wine Book Outside France'. In December 2007 it was shortlisted in the top three for 'Best Wine Book in the World (outside France)', and went on to win the world title at Olympia, London on 13 April 2008.

Radford wrote articles for a number of UK wine publications, including Harpers, Drinks International and Off-Licence News (all trade publications) and Gourmetour, Decanter, Wine Press (Beijing) as well as other consumer publications.

In March 2007, the first issue of Yes Chef! magazine was published, with a launch at Harvey Nichols in London, and Radford as editor. The magazine was quarterly and aimed at kitchen and restaurant professionals as well as interested amateur cooks. In 2011 it was relaunched as the bi-monthly Chef magazine, with Radford as Consultant Editor. In addition he continued to write mostly wine-related articles for magazines in the UK and abroad.

=== Broadcasting ===
Radford has appeared on several wine-related British television shows including A Question of Taste which ran from 1997 to 1998 on Carlton Food Network, hosted by Russell Grant.

From 1993 to 1997 Radford co-presented the breakfast programme for Bedfordshire, Hertfordshire and Buckinghamshire with BBC Three Counties Radio based in Luton. In 1997 he transferred to BBC Southern Counties Radio based in Brighton where he stayed until March 2006.

From April 2006 until August 2009 he worked as a local radio presenter for Splash FM in Worthing.

== Selected bibliography ==
- 2011 RIOJA REVISITED (e-book updating THE WINES OF RIOJA)
- 2011 THE WINES OF RIOJA (republished as an e-book)
- 2010 THE ULTIMATE WINE COMPANION (Sterling Epicure, New York – Spanish chapter)
- 2009 COMPANION GUIDE TO THE WINES OF THE WORLD (New edition – Spanish chapter)
- 2009 COOK ESPAÑA, DRINK ESPAÑA (American edition)
- 2008 WINE REPORT 2009 (Spanish chapter)
- 2007 WINE REPORT 2008 (Spanish chapter)
- 2007 COMER EN ESPAÑA, BEBER EN ESPAÑA (Spanish language version)
- 2007 COOK ESPAÑA, DRINK ESPAÑA (with Mario Sandoval)
- 2007 GREAT WINE TOURS OF THE WORLD (New edition – Spanish chapters)
- 2006 WINE REPORT 2007 (Spanish chapter)
- 2005 WINE REPORT 2006 (Spanish chapter)
- 2004 VINOS DE ESPAÑA – Spanish Translation of THE NEW SPAIN (New Edition)
- 2004 THE NEW SPAIN (New Edition)
- 2004 THE WINES OF RIOJA
- 2004 COMPANION GUIDE TO THE WINES OF THE WORLD (Spanish chapter)
- 2004 WINE REPORT 2005 (Spanish chapter)
- 2003 WINE REPORT 2004 (Spanish chapter)
- 2002 THE SPANISH WINE EDUCATION NOTES
- 2002 DE WIJNEN VAN SPANJE – Dutch translation of THE NEW SPAIN
- 2002 GREAT WINE TOURS OF THE WORLD (Spanish chapters)
- 2001 GYLDENDALS BOG OM DE SPANSKE VINE Danish translation of THE NEW SPAIN
- 2001 A CENTURY OF WINE (Spanish chapter)
- 2000 GLOBAL ENCYCLOPEDIA OF WINE (Spanish and Portuguese chapters)
- 2000 A CENTURY OF WINE (Mitchell Beazley, London – Spanish chapter)
- 2000 POCKET BOOK OF FORTIFIED AND SWEET WINES (with Stephen Brook – fortified wines)
- 1999 WEINLANDSCHAFT SPANIEN – German translation of THE NEW SPAIN
- 1998 THE NEW SPAIN

== Awards ==
- 2008 Best Wine Book in the world, Livre Gourmand Awards (London)
- 2007 Best European Wine Book, Livre Gourmand Awards (France)
- 2005 Premio Especial Alimentos de España (Spain)
- 2005 Best European Wine Book, Livre Gourmand Awards (France)
- 2000 Silver medal, Gastrononmische Akademie Deutschlands (Germany)
- 1999 Best European Wine Book, Livre Gourmand Awards (France)
- 1999 Prix de Champagne Lanson, Best European wine book (UK)
- 1999 Glenfiddich Award, Best European wine book (UK)
- 1996 Gran Orden de Caballeros del Vino, elected to membership (Spain)
