= BBC Radio Northampton =

Radio station in Northampton, England

Coordinates: 52.2397°N 0.8901°W

- Northampton; England
- Broadcast area: Northamptonshire
- Frequencies: FM: 103.6 MHz (Geddington); FM: 104.2 MHz (Northampton); DAB: 10C (Northampton); Freeview: 716
- RDS: BBC NHTN

Programming
- Language: English
- Format: Local news, talk and music

Ownership
- Owner: BBC Local Radio, BBC East

History
- First air date: 16 June 1982
- Former names: BBC Northampton (1990–2000)
- Former frequencies: 96.6 FM; 1107 MW

Technical information
- Licensing authority: Ofcom

Links
- Website: BBC Radio Northampton

BBC Radio Northampton is the BBC's local radio station serving Northamptonshire. It broadcasts on FM, DAB, digital TV and via BBC Sounds from studios on Abington Street in Northampton. The station has been broadcasting since 1982.

According to RAJAR, the station has a weekly audience of 70,000 listeners and a 4.0% share as of December 2023.

== History ==
The station was launched at 6:45am on 16 June 1982 on 1107 AM and 96.6 FM, with Jon Beynon's programme Start the Day, the first piece of music being John Williams's Superman theme, followed by Work That Body by Diana Ross.

The first outside broadcast followed on 17 June 1982, and the official opening was performed by Prince Richard, Duke of Gloucester.

The station was renamed BBC Northampton in 1990, but then reverted to BBC Radio Northampton on 3 April 2000.

== Technical ==
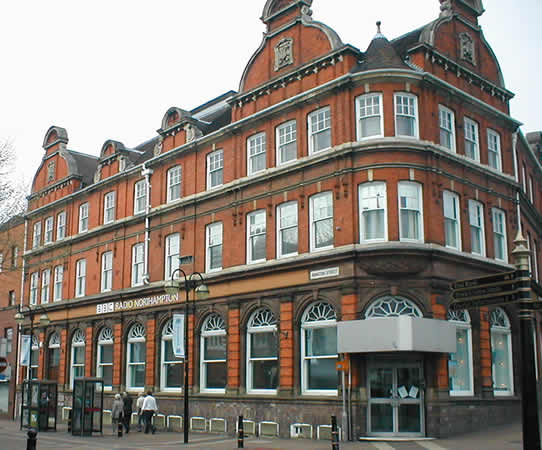
Broadcasting House in Abington Street, Northampton

The station has two FM transmitters. The 104.2 FM frequency broadcasts from the Boughton Green Road area of Northampton and covers the south and west of the county (including Northampton and surrounding area).

The 103.6 FM frequency broadcasts from a mast near the village of Geddington and covers the north and east of the county (including Kettering and Corby).

The station began DAB broadcasts on 28 March 2013 from the NOW Northampton Digital multiplex. The DAB transmitters are located at Northampton, Geddington, Towcester Potcote Farm, and Daventry. The transmitter at Daventry on Borough Hill was the BBC's first long wave transmitter, which began broadcasting on 27 July 1925. It had not been previously used by the BBC since 1978.

The station also broadcasts on Freeview TV channel 716 in the BBC East, BBC East Midlands and BBC South regions. It also streams online via BBC Sounds.

The station was originally available on 1107 kHz medium wave across the county from a transmitter at Kings Heath; this was reallocated to Virgin Radio using 1233 kHz.

Listeners in some southwestern parts of Northamptonshire, including Brackley, cannot receive FM signals that broadcast BBC Radio Northampton. However, those areas receive better FM signals from the Oxford transmitter which broadcasts BBC Radio Oxford on 95.2 FM.

== DAB licence ==
On 11 October 2007, the DAB licence was awarded to NOW Digital. MuxCo had also bid for the licence.

NOW Digital expected to start broadcasting from the three transmitters at Northampton, Geddington and Daventry in September 2008, however transmissions eventually began on 28 March 2013 on DAB channel 10C.

From February 2015, Ofcom approved the separation of the Northamptonshire multiplex from the Hertfordshire, Bedfordshire and Buckinghamshire multiplex, resulting in the removal of BBC Radio Northampton from the Herts, Beds and Bucks multiplex.

== Sports coverage ==
BBC Radio Northampton airs extensive sports coverage, led by Sports Editor Graham McKechnie. Football commentators include Tim Oglethorpe, Martin Smith and Terry Angus for Northampton Town, Tim Carroll at Brackley, Peter Short for Kettering Town, Hayden Pott at Hayden Road and Chuck Middleton at Corby. McKechnie commentates on Northampton Saints rugby with Lennie Newman and Ian Hunter. Northants Steelbacks cricket commentators include McKechnie, Andrew Radd, Mal Loye and Phil Rowe.

Matches are covered on FM, DAB or both, with additional coverage online.

The station broadcasts five weekly sports shows from 6 pm to 7 pm, these include 'The Saints Show' on Wednesday presented by McKechnie and Newman, focusing on a guest from Northampton Saints and 'The Cobblers Show' presented by Jake Sharpe on Thursday.

== Programming ==
Local programming is produced and broadcast from the BBC's Northampton studios from 6 am to 2 pm on Mondays to Fridays.

All other programming became regional or national in 2023; much of this is broadcast from the studios of BBC Three Counties Radio.

During the station's downtime, BBC Radio Northampton simulcasts overnight programming from BBC Radio 5 Live.

== Presenters ==
=== Notable former presenters ===
- Fi Glover – British journalist and presenter who currently hosts a two-hour show for Times Radio and the Off Air podcast.
- Liz Kershaw – former breakfast show presenter; 2002, 2005–2010. Went on to be a presenter on BBC Radio 6 Music.
- Stuart Linnell – veteran radio & TV presenter, former presenter of the breakfast and drivetime shows, also heard on BBC CWR.
- Roger Mosey – delivered the very first news bulletin. Later to become Head of BBC Television News and Director of the Beijing 2008 and London 2012 Olympic Games coverage.
- Howard Stableford – went on to present the BBC television series Tomorrow's World
- Martin Stanford – one of the station's original producer/presenters, Martin went on to spend over 25 years with Sky News and 5 years at LBC News.

== ViLoR ==
ViLoR (Virtual Local Radio) is the name of a BBC project that uses computer virtualisation and audio-over-IP to reduce the amount of equipment at a radio station. In 2014, BBC Radio Northampton became the first station to operate in this way. ViLoR has been implemented at all BBC Local Radio stations (except BBC Radio Manchester and BBC Radio London.)
