= BBC Dorset FM =

Former British radio station

- England
- Broadcast area: Dorset
- Frequency: 103.8 FM (Bincombe Hill)

Programming
- Language: English
- Format: Local news, talk and music

Ownership
- Owner: BBC Local Radio

History
- First air date: 26 April 1993
- Last air date: March 1996

BBC Dorset FM was a BBC Local Radio station based in Dorchester, covering the county of Dorset in England which broadcast from 1993 to 1996. It was the last BBC Local Radio station to launch which covered a previously unserved area. It operated as an opt-out station from BBC Radio Devon for around 23 hours a week.

== History ==
BBC Dorset FM emerged after plans for a full-time station for Dorset were cancelled in 1990, as part of a series of measures designed to save £3 million. Dorset FM opened on 26 April 1993, broadcasting to central and West Dorset on 103.8 FM from its transmitter on Bincombe Hill.

The station produced three-and-a-half hours of its own programming each weekday - Good Morning Dorset from 6:30 am to 9 am, and Dorset Newshour from 12 pm to 1 pm. In addition there were three hours of programmes on Saturday and two hours on Sunday. The remainder of the station's output was relayed from BBC Radio Devon.

In March 1996, BBC Dorset FM closed, and was replaced on 103.8 FM by a relay of BBC Radio Solent, albeit with a news and information service tailored to rural Dorset. The Dorchester studio became a district office of Radio Solent.

== Planned relaunch ==
By 2004, the BBC were proposing a series of new BBC local radio stations, including one for Dorset. However, as a part of a series of cutbacks announced in October 2007, plans for the station were abandoned. The Dorset Broadcasting Action Group continues to campaign for the introduction of a separate station for Dorset.

Thanks to continued pressure on the BBC by the Dorset Broadcasting Action Group (DorBAG), the BBC finally launched a new dedicated Dorset Breakfast programme on 8 July 2013. This is now an opt-out from BBC Radio Solent on 103.8 FM using the transmitter at Bincombe Hill and, more recently on several DAB transmitters but neither FM nor DAB reach most of West Dorset due to coverage of the Bincombe Hill / DAB transmitters which effectively only reach mid / south Dorset, leaving much of the county still uncovered. However, it is also available online and on Freeview channel 734. The BBC has agreed with DorBAG that the ultimate aim is to extend the programme to cover the whole county. This may require additional transmitters which is under discussion between the BBC and DorBAG.

It transmits from 7 am to 9 am weekdays. The reporting / editorial team is based in the Dorchester studio create and runs the programme. The remainder of the broadcasts each day are of BBC Radio Solent.

== See also ==
- BBC Radio Devon
- BBC Radio Solent
