= BBC London =

British broadcaster

- BBC London's area within the UK
- TV transmitters: Crystal Palace, Reigate
- Radio stations: BBC Radio London; BBC Radio Surrey; BBC Radio Berkshire; BBC Radio Essex; BBC Radio Three Counties
- Headquarters: BBC's Broadcasting House, London
- Area: Greater London; Most of Surrey; Parts of Hertfordshire; Parts of Essex; Parts of Bedfordshire; Parts of Buckinghamshire; Parts of Berkshire; Parts of Hampshire; Parts of Kent; Parts of West Sussex; Parts of Oxfordshire
- Nation: BBC English Regions
- Regions: London and parts of the South East and East
- Key people: Mike McFarlane; Head of Regional and Local Programmes
- Launch date: 2000
- Official website: www.bbc.co.uk/london

BBC London is the BBC English Region producing local radio, television, teletext and online services in London, Surrey and parts of the surrounding areas of the Home Counties. Its output includes the daily BBC London news bulletin and weekly Sunday Politics on television, the BBC Radio London radio station and local coverage of the London area on BBC Online and BBC Red Button. The region's headquarters are situated in the new eastern extension of the BBC's Broadcasting House.

== Services ==
=== Television ===
The staple of the local television service is BBC London bulletin which broadcasts daily on BBC One, appearing with short bulletins during BBC Breakfast, after the BBC News at One, the BBC News at Ten and BBC Weekend News. The flagship programme is broadcast between 18:30 and 19:00 each weekday evening, following the end of the BBC News at Six and is presented by Riz Lateef. Comparisons are inevitably made to the commercial TV regional competition, in this case ITV News London, which is produced for ITV by ITN. BBC London can be viewed in any part of the UK (and Europe) on digital satellite channel 954 on the BBC UK regional TV on satellite service.

BBC London also produces current affairs, features and sports programming for the region including the topical magazine series Inside Out, a 20-minute opt-out during Sunday Politics.

=== Radio ===
BBC Radio London combines speech and music based programmes 24 hours a day, seven days a week. Broadcasting across London on 94.9 FM, DAB, Virgin Media Channel 930, Sky Channel 0152 (in London area only), Freeview Channel 721 and also online. The station was previously known as BBC London Live, GLR (Greater London Radio) and BBC London 94.9.

The current Breakfast show presenters are Penny Smith and Paul Ross and the mid morning phone-in show is presented by Vanessa Feltz. The Breakfast and Drivetime shows feature a wealth of local London news and comment with roving reporters out and about. Other programmes such as JoAnne Good or Robert Elms include varied speech and music with local news bulletins every half-hour.

News bulletins on BBC Radio London at the top of the hour are traditionally longer than other BBC radio services at 5 minutes to fit in international, national and local stories with local sport and weather. In addition to the News service, a dedicated travel news service is operated by BBC London on TV, Radio and Online using information supplied by Transport for London, National Rail and National Highways. The travel news on BBC Radio London is updated at 31 and 58 minutes past each hour during off peak times, and every 15 minutes, starting at the top of the hour, during evening and morning peaks. It is one of the few radio stations to have access to TfL traffic cameras.

Sport is a major part of the radio schedule, with a three-hour sports based programme each weeknight evening and four-hour sport specials on Saturdays and Sundays. This is more than most other BBC local radio stations and reflects London's large number of sporting teams and events.

== History ==
The bulletin launched on 1 October 2001 following changes to the coverage areas of BBC transmitters allowing for the establishment of new editorial areas. The main result was a reorganisation of the BBC's South East region; the London area was to break away entirely, while a new programme, South East Today was to be created for the new South East region. BBC London, as it came to be called, replaced the long-running Newsroom South East.

Greater London and its environs have had a regional BBC television news service for many decades, but the boundaries of the region have always been somewhat nebulous due to the coverage areas of the transmitters used, as television signals do not tend to stick neatly to administrative or historical boundaries. Therefore, while the main focus of "regional" news coverage for this area has always been on the capital itself, it has for much of the BBC's life had to offer coverage of other parts of the Home Counties as well.

There were many incarnations of regional news programmes in this area before the current programme was introduced in 2001. These included the London segment of the Nationwide from Lime Grove Studios; in this case, the regional presenters for London were also usually the main presenters of the national sequence of the programme which followed. Other identities for the London area coverage were BBC London Plus, and finally Newsroom South East.

Originally, the BBC London and the South East region took in the whole of Greater London, together with parts of Essex, Hertfordshire, Kent, Surrey, Hampshire, Buckinghamshire, Berkshire, Sussex, Bedfordshire and Oxfordshire. This meant that sizeable communities which probably deserved dedicated programming of their own – such as Oxford, Luton, Crawley and Medway – were often ill-served by a London-biased programme.

The area created for the BBC London programme to broadcast to now covers a much more tightly defined area, chiefly Greater London but still including parts of Bedfordshire, Essex, and Hertfordshire in the East of England region and parts of Berkshire, Buckinghamshire, Hampshire, Kent, Oxfordshire, Surrey and West Sussex in the South East England region. There is also some overlap with the editorial areas of other BBC regions in this part of England such as BBC East, BBC South East and BBC South.

Oxfordshire (excluding Henley-on-Thames), most of Buckinghamshire (excluding Marlow and High Wycombe), north Berkshire, north east Wiltshire, south east Gloucestershire and south west Northamptonshire, took an opt-out of South Today for some years before coming to an end on financial grounds in 2022. Most of Kent and East Sussex continues to be covered by the BBC South East region based in Tunbridge Wells, which produces South East Today.

== Studios ==
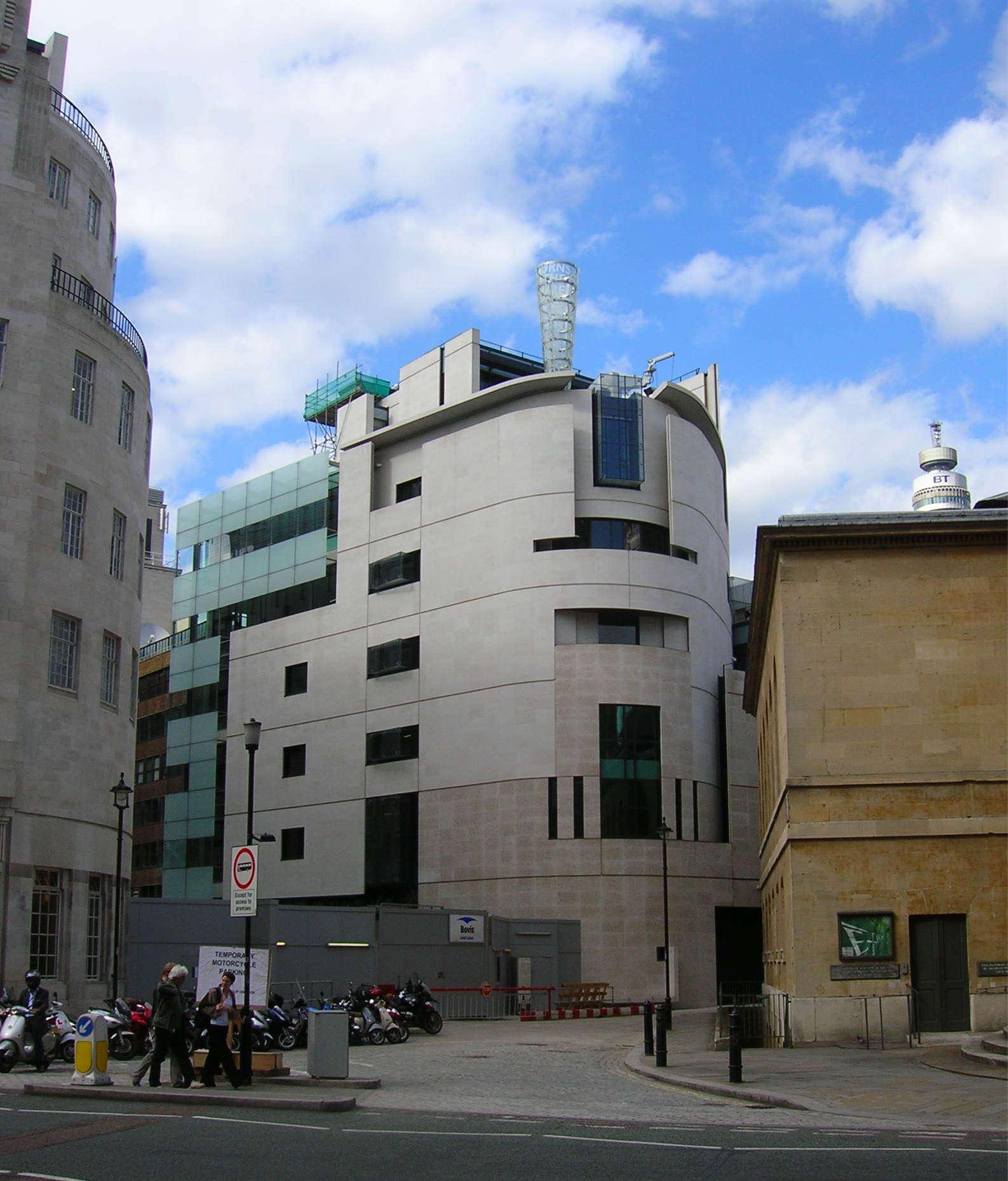
BBC London moved to the new Egton Wing of Broadcasting House in 2009

The previous news services for the area, in the old BBC South East region, were variously based in Shepherd's Bush, White City and Elstree in Hertfordshire. Following the launch of BBC London, the region moved into facilities in Marylebone High Street, where the news service was based alongside BBC London News and the BBC's Governance Unit.

The arrangement was only a temporary one, as at the time the BBC was trying to consolidate its London portfolio into a few properties. This included, most notably, the planned closure of BBC Television Centre and the extension and renovation of Broadcasting House, stage one of which would construct a huge wing, mirroring Broadcasting House in shape, size and structure named Egton Wing. The wing has recently been renamed the Peel Wing after John Peel and is the home of a number of BBC services including BBC London, who moved there in 2009 following the structure's completion and fitting.

== See also ==
- BBC English Regions
- BBC Radio London
- BBC Radio Surrey
- BBC Essex
- BBC Three Counties Radio
- BBC Radio Berkshire
- ITV London
