= BBC Local Radio =

Local and regional radio services for England and the Channel Islands

- Logo used since 2021
- Type: Division
- Industry: Mass media
- Founded: 1965
- Headquarters: The Mailbox, Birmingham (English Regions HQ) Broadcasting House, London (Audio HQ), United Kingdom
- Area served: England; Channel Islands
- Key people: Chris Burns (Head of Audio and Digital for BBC England); Jason Horton (Director of Production for BBC Local Radio)
- Services: Local Radio
- Parent: BBC
- Website: bbc.co.uk/radio

BBC Local Radio (also referred to as Local BBC Radio) is the BBC's local and regional radio division for England and the Channel Islands, consisting of 39 stations.

As of December 2024, the network broadcasts to a combined audience of 7.1 million, with a listening share of 4.6%, according to RAJAR.

BBC Local Radio does not operate in Northern Ireland, Scotland or Wales, which instead have their own national stations.

== History ==
Former BBC Local Radio logo, used from 2008 to 2020

The popularity of pirate radio was to challenge a then very "stiff" and blinkered management at the BBC. The most prominent concession by the BBC was the creation of BBC Radio 1 to satisfy the ever-demanding new youth culture with their thirst for new, popular music. The other, however, was that these pirate radio stations were, in some cases, local. As a result, BBC Local Radio began as an experiment.

Initially, stations had to be co-funded by the BBC and local authorities, which only some Labour-controlled areas proved willing to do. Radio Leicester was the first to launch on 8 November 1967, followed by Leeds, Stoke, Durham, Sheffield, Merseyside, Brighton, and Nottingham. The local authority funding requirement was dropped by the early 1970s, and stations spread across the country; many city-based stations later expanded their remit to cover an entire county.

There were eight stations in the initial "experiment", which lasted for two years. When this ended, it was deemed so successful that all of the stations, except BBC Radio Durham, remained on air. More followed in 1970 and 1971: BBC Radio Birmingham, Bristol, Blackburn, Derby, Humberside, London, Manchester, Medway, Newcastle (replacing Radio Durham), Oxford, Solent, and Teesside. However, development was stopped by the Government in 1971 with 20 stations on air as no new money from that licence fee settlement was available to launch any more stations leaving many areas were still without a service, most notably in the south west and East Anglia, although a weekday breakfast programme was developed for those two regions which aired on BBC Radio 4’s VHF frequencies, and it wasn't until 1980 that any new stations were added to the network.

Despite the success of the original stations, they were seen as somewhat flawed as they originally only broadcast on the FM waveband, and not on the more widely available AM waveband. This was eventually rectified a few years later when MW transmitters began to be added.

Independent Local Radio (ILR) launched nationally in 1973, with nineteen stations; more followed in subsequent years. As a result, many of the BBC Local Radio stations found themselves in direct competition with commercial competitors that utilised many of the popular DJs from the pirate radio stations, and that gained, in most cases, large audiences. Despite this, BBC Local Radio continued to flourish, and the 1980s and early 1990s saw the network expanded with a combination of new launches and existing city-based services expanded to include whole counties. By the mid-1990s this expansion concluded and since then, the complement of stations has remained unchanged.

BBC Local stations were never intended to broadcast around the clock but from launch, rather than each station's frequency going silent, each station has carried another BBC station when not on air. Until the early 1990s BBC Radio 2 was carried due to it broadcasting a 24-hour service, although during the 1980s and early 1990s some stations carried output from BBC Radio 1 at various times, such as simulcasting Radio 1's Top 40 programme on Sunday afternoons. During the mid-1990s many stations switched to airing the BBC World Service and by the end of the 1990s all stations were carrying BBC Radio 5 Live during their downtime.

The 1980s saw an expansion of programming hours but stations had still handed over to Radio 2 by early evening. This was seen as unacceptable by the BBC so the decision was taken to begin the roll-out of regional evening programming which saw the same programme networked on all the stations in that area. This rolled out on a region-by-region basis between 1988 and 1990, resulting in all stations providing local/regional programming on weeknights, and in many areas at the weekend as well, until midnight.

== Current operation ==
The radio stations are operated from locations around the country that usually share with the BBC regional TV news services, and their news gathering bureaux. The stations are operated by the region in which the station is based and are the responsibility of the BBC English Regions department, a division of BBC News.

The remit for each Local Radio station is the same: to offer a primarily speech-based service; comprising news and information complemented by music. The target audience of BBC Local Radio is listeners aged over fifty, who are not served as well by BBC Radio as other age groups.

Each station produces local programmes on weekdays from 6am until 2pm. Depending on location and population, afternoon, evening and weekend schedules will vary from shared regional programmes to being fully local although all live sports coverage continues to remain local. Since October 2023, all stations have carried the all England Late Show which originates in London or Manchester, and since November 2023, the Sunday evening show is also carried on all stations.

All local BBC radio stations simulcast BBC Radio 5 Live from 0100 until 0600.

== Transmission ==
All of the BBC Local Radio stations broadcast on FM, digital radio, Freeview and BBC Sounds in their respective areas across England, but BBC Radio London is also available on Sky UK, Freesat and Virgin Media.

Also, until the start of the 1990s, all BBC stations were broadcast on medium wave although initially, the BBC's local stations were broadcast only on VHF. The start of the 1990s saw new stations, once again, launching only on FM and in 1992 and 1993, six MW transmitters - BBC Radio Cleveland, BBC Radio Northampton, BBC Radio Oxford, BBC GLR, BBC GMR and one of BBC Radio Nottingham and BBC Radio WM's transmitters - were switched off and three, including BBC GLR's MW frequency, were re-allocated for use by commercial radio. In 1996, the MW frequencies of BBC Radio Leicester and BBC WM were handed over to the BBC Asian Network.

MW transmitter closures began again in 2012, initially as a five-week trial to find out if listeners would miss or complain about the lack of AM services. Two of the four transmitters partaking in the trial - BBC Radio Nottingham's MW transmitter and BBC Radio Kent's relay at Rusthall near Tunbridge Wells - remained off-air after the BBC said that the trial switch-off attracted very few complaints from listeners. In 2018, the MW transmissions of BBC Radios Sussex, Surrey, Humberside, Wiltshire, Nottingham, Kent and Lincolnshire ended and MW coverage for Radios Devon, Lancashire and Essex was reduced. Altogether, thirteen MW transmitters were switched off.

In 2020, the MW transmissions of BBC Radio Cornwall, BBC Radio Newcastle, BBC Radio Merseyside, BBC Radio Solent, BBC Three Counties Radio and BBC Radio York ended, BBC Radio Cumbria stopped broadcasting on MW in Whitehaven and BBC Radio Norfolk's Norwich MW transmitter went silent. In 2021, a further eight BBC Local Radio stations - BBC Essex, BBC Radio Cambridgeshire, BBC Radio Devon, BBC Radio Leeds, BBC Radio Sheffield, BBC Hereford & Worcester, BBC Radio Stoke and BBC Radio Lancashire - stopped broadcasting on MW. BBC Radio Guernsey and BBC Radio Jersey also stopped broadcasting on MW in 2026.

As of April 2026, only BBC Radio Cumbria, BBC Radio Derby, BBC Radio Gloucestershire, BBC Radio Norfolk (in West Norfolk) and BBC Radio Somerset still broadcast on MW. However, all five of those stations are to stop broadcast on medium wave at the end of November 2026, as part of BBC Local Radio's final phase of medium wave switch offs.

Due to sports rights broadcasting restrictions, some commentaries are not available on BBC Sounds. In this instance, an alternative national programme will usually be broadcast on Saturday afternoons. Overnight events are replaced by a looping message explaining this is broadcast.

== Stations ==
BBC Local Radio areas and studios (Guernsey and Jersey not shown)

A list of the forty local radio stations by region. In addition to these stations, BBC Radio Solent operates an opt-out service covering Dorset. There were also opt-out services covering Milton Keynes (BBC Three Counties Radio), Peterborough and the Fens (BBC Radio Cambridgeshire), Plymouth (BBC Radio Devon), and Swindon (BBC Wiltshire); but these ceased in 2012 due to cutbacks as part of the BBC's "Delivering Quality First" programme.

BBC East

- BBC Essex (Broadcasts to Essex)
- BBC Radio Cambridgeshire (Broadcasts to Cambridgeshire)
- BBC Radio Norfolk (Broadcasts to Norfolk)
- BBC Radio Northampton (Broadcasts to Northamptonshire but does not broadcast to the South Northamptonshire District)
- BBC Radio Suffolk (Broadcasts to Suffolk)
- BBC Three Counties Radio (Broadcasts to Bedfordshire, Hertfordshire and Buckinghamshire)

BBC East Midlands

- BBC Radio Derby (Broadcasts to Derbyshire and East Staffordshire)
- BBC Radio Leicester (Broadcasts to Leicestershire, and Rutland)
- BBC Radio Nottingham (Broadcasts to Nottinghamshire)

BBC London

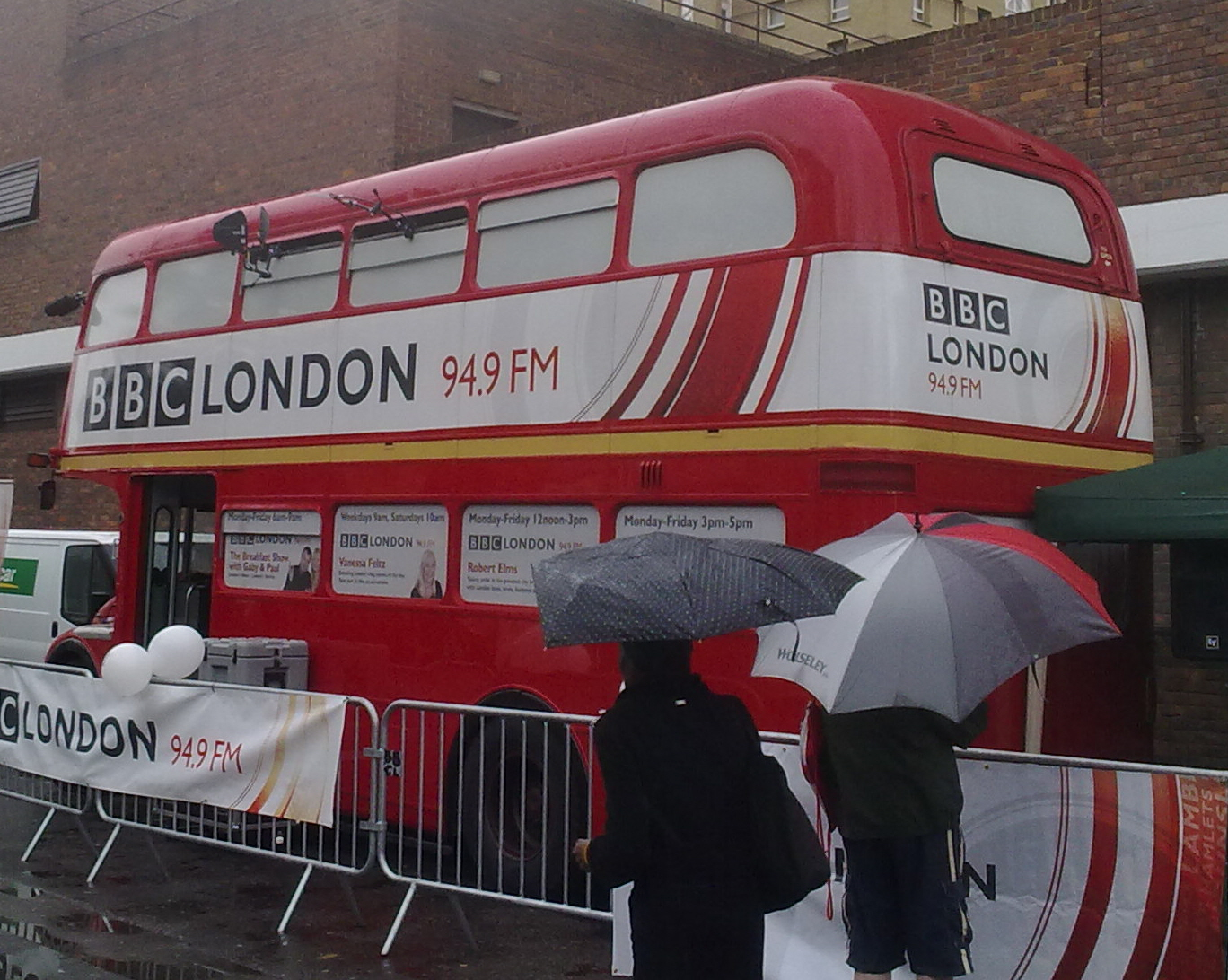
A Routemaster double-decker bus, being used as a mobile radio broadcasting facility by BBC Radio London in 2011, under its then current name of BBC London 94.9.

- BBC Radio London (Broadcasts in Greater London)

BBC North East and Cumbria

- BBC Radio Cumbria (Broadcasts to Cumbria)
- BBC Radio Newcastle (Broadcasts to Tyne and Wear and Northern County Durham)
- BBC Radio Tees (Broadcasts to Central and South of County Durham and Northern parts of North Yorkshire including Whitby.)

BBC North West

- BBC Radio Lancashire (Broadcasts to Lancashire and Western parts of North Yorkshire)
- BBC Radio Manchester (Broadcasts to Greater Manchester, North-East Cheshire and North-West Derbyshire)
- BBC Radio Merseyside (Broadcasts to Liverpool, North-West Cheshire and West Lancashire)

BBC South

- BBC Radio Berkshire (Broadcasts to Berkshire, South Oxfordshire, North Hampshire and Marlow in Buckinghamshire)
- BBC Radio Oxford (Broadcasts to Oxfordshire, South Northamptonshire and Princes Risborough in Buckinghamshire)
- BBC Radio Solent (Broadcasts to Hampshire, Dorset and the Isle of Wight)

BBC South East

- BBC Radio Kent (Broadcasts to Kent)
- BBC Radio Surrey (Broadcasts to Surrey, North East Hampshire and Northern parts of West Sussex)
- BBC Radio Sussex (Broadcasts to East Sussex and West Sussex except for northern parts including Crawley)

BBC South West

- BBC Radio Cornwall (Broadcasts to Cornwall)
- BBC Radio Devon (Broadcasts to Devon)
- BBC Radio Guernsey (Broadcasts to the Island of Guernsey, Alderney and Sark)
- BBC Radio Jersey (Broadcasts to the Island of Jersey)

BBC West

- BBC Radio Bristol (Broadcasts to Bristol City, Bath, North Somerset and South Gloucestershire)
- BBC Radio Gloucestershire (Broadcasts to Gloucestershire except for areas in South Gloucestershire)
- BBC Radio Somerset (Broadcasts to Somerset)
- BBC Radio Wiltshire (Broadcasts to Wiltshire)

BBC Midlands

- BBC Radio WM (Broadcasts to the West Midlands, Central Staffordshire and South Staffordshire areas including Tamworth)
- BBC CWR (Broadcasts to Coventry and Warwickshire)
- BBC Hereford & Worcester (Broadcasts to Herefordshire and Worcestershire)
- BBC Radio Shropshire (Broadcasts to Shropshire)
- BBC Radio Stoke (Broadcasts to North Staffordshire and South Cheshire)

BBC Yorkshire

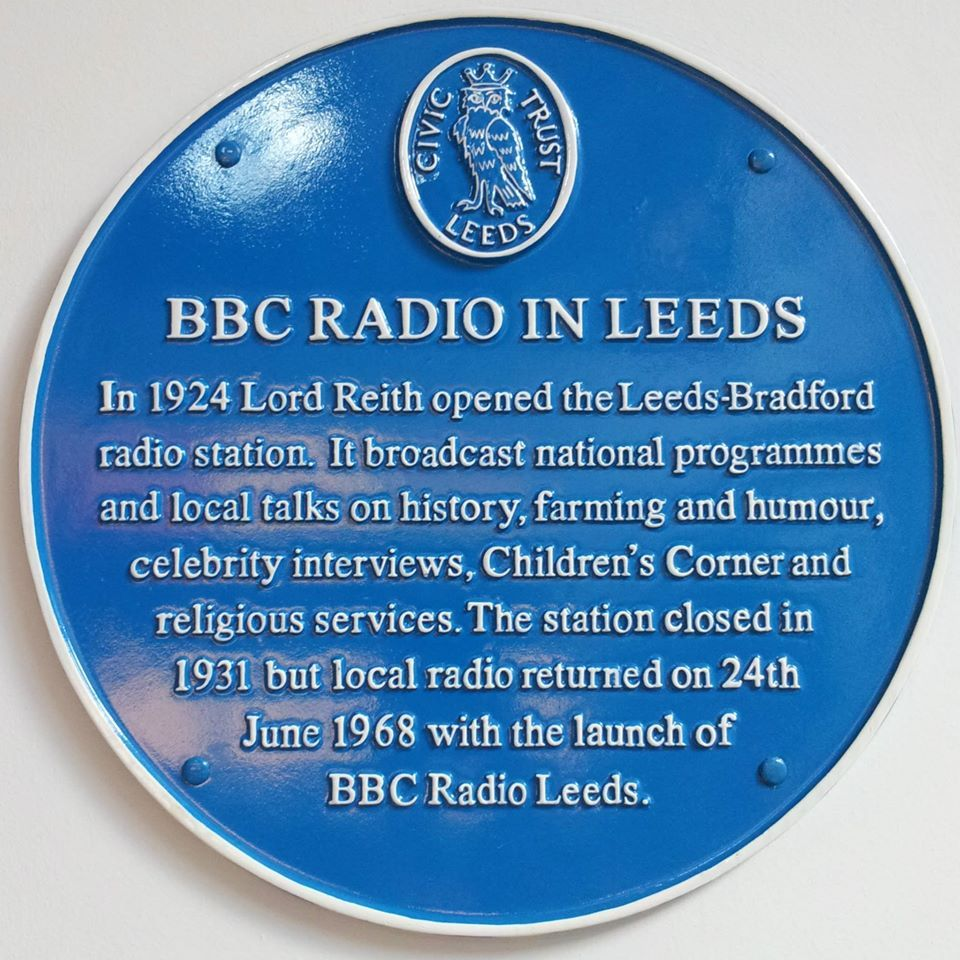
Blue plaque placed by Leeds Civic Society outlining radio in Leeds

- BBC Radio Leeds (Broadcasts to West Yorkshire)
- BBC Radio Sheffield (Broadcasts to South Yorkshire, North Nottinghamshire and North Derbyshire)
- BBC Radio York (Broadcasts to North Yorkshire except for the northern area, including Whitby, and areas west of Craven).

BBC Yorkshire and Lincolnshire

- BBC Radio Humberside (Broadcasts to East Yorkshire and Northern Lincolnshire)
- BBC Radio Lincolnshire (Broadcasts to Lincolnshire but does not broadcast to Northern and North East Lincolnshire)

Former stations

- BBC Dorset FM
- BBC Radio Durham
- BBC Southern Counties Radio
- BBC Thames Valley FM

The stations were launched progressively; starting with BBC Radio Leicester on 8 November 1967, with the last station to launch being the short-lived BBC Dorset FM on 26 April 1993. Since then, many stations have been merged and renamed but no new stations have been created where no service previously existed, as plans to launch stations in unserved areas, most notably in Cheshire, have not materialised.

== Imaging ==
Between October 2009 and April 2012, a three note jingle package produced by Mcasso Music Production was gradually rolled out across the network, and was in use by all BBC Local Radio stations. Mcasso also updated the imaging in October 2015 which was launched by BBC Radio London (on the day of the station's 45th anniversary) replacing the three-note package with a six-note package.

In January 2020, BBC Radio Leicester launched a brand new custom-made jingle package by Reelworld, based in MediaCity UK, Salford. The new jingle package was rolled out to all BBC Local Radio stations over the course of the year, alongside a refreshed "on air" sound to help encourage younger listeners to the station. The new station branding also incorporates a new tag line, "The Sound of *area of coverage*, and all the music you love". The new jingle package marked the first time in ten years that "sung jingles" were used in the stations' on air branding.

== Dave and Sue ==
Dave and Sue are two fictional radio listeners created as marketing personas. Descriptions of the characters, created by the BBC, were given to all their local radio presenters as representative target listeners during the 2000s. They were later superseded by the "BBC Local Radio 2010" strategy.

The characters were created as part of "Project Bullseye". Its stated aim was "To develop great radio programming ... we need to know where the centre of our audience target is and be able to focus on it in all we do."

Dave and Sue are both 55. Sue is a school secretary, while Dave is a self-employed plumber. They are both divorcees with grown-up children. The characters shop at Asda, and wear casual clothes. The couple have little interest in high culture, or politics, and see the world as "a dangerous and depressing place". They hope that radio will be "something that will cheer them up and make them laugh".

BBC Local Radio staff were given facts and timelines about Dave and Sue, described as "composite listeners". Staff were asked to focus on producing something which the pair would enjoy listening to.

The BBC also produced photographs of the couple, to encourage presenters to visualise their potential listeners. At the 2005 Frank Gillard Awards for BBC Local Radio, the corporation hired two actors to represent the fictional couple and award a prize to the "Receptionist of the Year".

Mia Costello of BBC Radio Solent wrote a controversial internal memo in October 2006, re-stating the importance of these characters. She wrote: "Whatever job you do on station, make sure this week, you broadcast to Dave and Sue – people in their fifties. Only put on callers sounding in the 45–64 range. I don't want to hear really elderly voices. Only talk about things that are positive and appealing to people in this age range. Only do caller round ups about people in this age range." This was reprinted the following month in the Southern Daily Echo, following which a BBC spokesperson commented "Out of context these notes sound harsh and we apologise if they offend anyone."

== BBC Sounds ==
BBC Local Radio is available as a listen-again service on BBC Sounds.

England Unwrapped was launched in 2019 and shares stories made by Local Radio teams.

== See also ==
- Independent Local Radio
- BBC Radio
- BBC English Regions
- BBC Scotland, which produces BBC Radio Scotland and BBC Radio nan Gàidheal
- BBC Cymru Wales, which produces BBC Radio Wales and BBC Radio Cymru
- BBC Northern Ireland, which produces BBC Radio Ulster and BBC Radio Foyle
- Radio in the United Kingdom
