= BBC Radio Wiltshire =

Coordinates: 51.5539°N 1.7776°W

- Swindon; England
- Broadcast area: Wiltshire
- Frequencies: FM: 103.5 MHz (Salisbury and Amesbury); FM: 103.6 MHz (Swindon); FM: 104.3 MHz (Chippenham and Corsham); FM: 104.9 MHz (Marlborough); DAB: 10D (West Wiltshire); DAB: 11C (Swindon); DAB+: 8B (Salisbury); Freeview: 713
- RDS: BBCWilts; BBCWltSn

Programming
- Language: English
- Format: Local news, talk and music

Ownership
- Owner: BBC Local Radio, BBC West, BBC South

History
- First air date: 4 April 1989
- Former names: BBC Wiltshire Sound (1989–2002); BBC Wiltshire (2008–2020)

Technical information
- Licensing authority: Ofcom

Links
- Website: www.bbc.co.uk/bbcwiltshire/

BBC Radio Wiltshire is the BBC's local radio station serving the English county of Wiltshire.

It broadcasts on FM, DAB, digital TV and via BBC Sounds from studios at Prospect Place in Swindon.

According to RAJAR, the station had a weekly audience of 89,000 and a 6.2% share as of December 2023.

== History ==
=== BBC Wiltshire Sound (1989–2002) ===
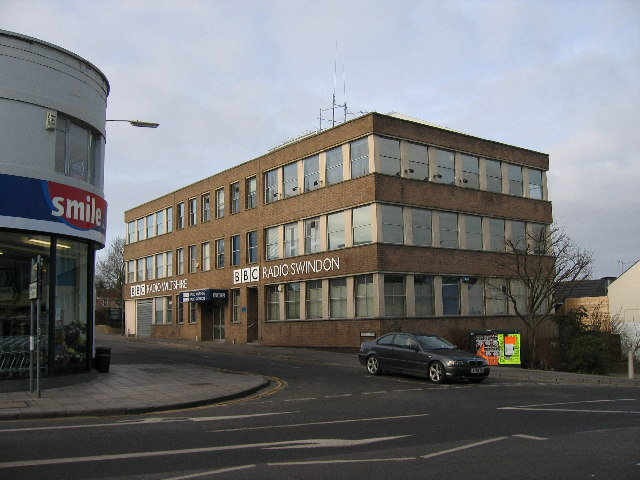
Radio studios on Victoria Hill, Swindon

BBC Radio Wiltshire logo used from 2020 to 2022.

The station was launched as BBC Wiltshire Sound on 4 April 1989, with its main studios and headquarters in Prospect Place, Swindon. The station was not initially titled 'BBC Radio Wiltshire' because at that time its competitor GWR owned the trademark of 'Wiltshire' and 'Radio' in whatever combination.

The first presenter heard on air was Paul Chantler. The early logo of the station featured the Westbury White Horse. BBC Wiltshire Sound had a reputation for solid local programming focusing on news and information.

From 1991 to 1994, the station's Programme Editor was Mike Gray, who left to found the successful Kiss 102 and Kiss 105 radio stations in Manchester and Yorkshire. Amongst Gray's innovations was giving 17-year-old Swindon student Mark Franklin his own programmes, which led to him being spotted and hired as a presenter on Top of the Pops. Other specialist music presenters at the time included jazz singer Rosemary Squires.

One of BBC Wiltshire Sound's best-known features was the long-running soap opera Acrebury, in which all the characters were voiced by presenter and actor Gerry Hughes, for which he was awarded a Guinness World Record. The city of Salisbury was given its own breakfast show for a time, due to its distance from Swindon. Both the Salisbury breakfast show and Acrebury were discontinued as part of a virtual relaunch of the station in 2000. Along with a number of presenter departures, the changes led to listener protests at the station's headquarters and unflattering headlines in the local newspaper.

The 2000 relaunch gave listeners in Swindon separate programmes from the rest of the county, introduced in response to the rapid growth of the town and its new unitary authority status. New presenters brought in for the Swindon programmes included Dan Chisholm and Peter Heaton-Jones.

=== BBC Radio Wiltshire and BBC Radio Swindon (2002–2008) ===
On 11 November 2002, the separation was enhanced when the station was effectively split into two services: BBC Radio Swindon, covering the town and surrounding areas, and BBC Radio Wiltshire for the rest of the county. Originally the two stations had their own programmes for most of the day, but by 2007, following a number of schedule changes and presenter departures, only the breakfast shows remained separate, with all other programmes simulcast on both stations.

=== BBC Wiltshire (2008–2020) ===
On 21 April 2008, 19 years after the original launch, the two stations effectively merged again and became a single entity branded as BBC Wiltshire. This became the umbrella name for the radio station and online service, in common with branding policy across most of the BBC local radio network. Swindon initially retained its own breakfast show, for which the branding Swindon's BBC Wiltshire was used. Currently all programmes across the week are broadcast on all BBC Wiltshire frequencies with no separate opt-outs.

=== BBC Radio Wiltshire (2020–present) ===
On 9 March 2020, the station reverted to BBC Radio Wiltshire again, in order to fit the station name in to the new jingle package. In the autumn of 2023, a series of schedule changes reduced local programming to just 8 hours a day on weekdays and a 4-hour afternoon sport show on Saturday.

== Technical ==
BBC Radio Wiltshire broadcasts from its studios in Swindon on FM frequencies 103.5 (Newton Barrow, near A360, 5 miles northwest of Salisbury), 103.6 (Blunsdon, next to the A419, north of Swindon), 104.3 (Naish Hill, near A342, 4 miles west of Calne, for west Wiltshire), 104.9 (Marlborough, for east Wiltshire); on DAB; Freeview TV channel 713 in the BBC West and BBC South regions; and via BBC Sounds.

== Programming ==
Local programming is produced and broadcast from the BBC's Swindon studios from 6 am to 2 pm on Mondays to Fridays. The afternoon programme is shared with BBC Radio Gloucestershire and the weekday evening shows (6 pm to 10 pm) are all broadcast across the BBC West area with the exception of sport programmes.

Weekend programmes from 6 am to 2 pm are shared regionally across the BBC West area. The breakfast show is presented from Gloucester with the brunch (10 am to 2 pm) show presented from Bristol. The Saturday afternoon sport programme (2 pm to 6 pm) broadcasts only to Wiltshire.

The Sunday afternoon programme (2 pm to 6 pm) is currently shared with, and broadcast from, BBC Radio Gloucestershire. The BBC intends to make this a national programme in the autumn of 2024.

The weekend 6 pm to 10 pm programmes on Saturdays are both broadcast across the BBC West area, with the Sunday evening programme in that timeslot being a national programme from London.

The late show, airing from 10 pm to 1 am, is a national programme originating in either Manchester or London.

BBC Radio Wiltshire simulcasts overnight programming from BBC Radio 5 Live from 1 am to 6 am.
