= BBC Radio Durham =

Former BBC local radio station

- County Durham; England
- Frequency: FM

Programming
- Language: English
- Format: Local news, talk and music

Ownership
- Owner: BBC Local Radio

History
- First air date: 3 July 1968
- Last air date: 25 August 1972

BBC Radio Durham was a BBC local radio station set up in 1968.

== Background and history ==
BBC Radio Durham was part of the BBC's original plan to have nine sites where local radio experiments would be carried out. It is the only one of the original stations to have fully closed down.

It opened on 3 July 1968. At the opening, the Vice-Chancellor of Durham University attended, Derman Christopherson. 1% of Durham University students would later listen in. However, four years later it closed after the government restricted the BBC to twenty local radio stations and the corporation responded by ceasing transmissions on 25 August 1972. Its resources were transferred to Carlisle where BBC Radio Carlisle, now BBC Radio Cumbria, was formed.

It was the only one of the original stations to cover a county rather than a city and when the BBC opened Radio Newcastle which covered the north of the county and Radio Teesside (later Radio Cleveland and now BBC Tees) covered the south, it was sandwiched between the two with the northern part of County Durham now covered by BBC Radio Newcastle, with the southern part served by BBC Radio Tees.

Former BBC News correspondent Kate Adie worked at Radio Durham, before joining BBC Radio Bristol in 1970. Other presenters included Mike Hollingsworth, Eileen McCabe and Barbara Bailey.

== Programming ==
In 1969, Durham University gave the station a grant for educational programmes, overseen by the Director of Extra Mural Studies, W. E Saxton. This became the Durham University Lecture Series. The frequency moved to 94.5FM from Pontop Pike on Friday October 30 1970, with the last programme being a Halloween party by some Durham University students.
