= BBC South =

English region of the BBC

- BBC South's area within the UK
- TV transmitters: Hannington; Midhurst; Oxford; Rowridge
- Radio stations: BBC Radio Berkshire; BBC Radio Oxford; BBC Radio Solent; BBC Radio Wiltshire; BBC Radio Surrey; BBC Radio Sussex; BBC Radio Three Counties; BBC Radio Northampton and BBC Radio Gloucestershire
- Headquarters: Broadcasting House, Southampton
- Area: Oxfordshire; Berkshire; Hampshire; Isle of Wight; West Sussex (majority) eastern and central Dorset; Wiltshire (Salisbury and Swindon); Gloucestershire (Stow-on-the-Wold and Fairford); Northamptonshire (Brackley); Buckinghamshire (Aylesbury, Buckingham and Princes Risborough); Surrey (Surrey Heath and Waverley)
- Nation: BBC English Regions
- Regions: South and parts of South West
- Key people: Jason Horton (Head of Regional & Local Programmes)
- Launch date: 1961
- Official website: news.bbc.co.uk/local/hi/default.stm

BBC South is the BBC English Region serving Hampshire, Isle of Wight, Dorset, West Sussex, Oxfordshire, Berkshire and parts of Gloucestershire, Buckinghamshire, Northamptonshire, Surrey, and Wiltshire, with geographic coverage varying between digital, television and radio services.

The region is headquartered in Southampton and has smaller offices in Brighton, Dorchester, Oxford, Reading, Swindon and Guildford.

== Services ==
=== Television ===
BBC South's television output (broadcast on BBC One) consists of its flagship regional news service BBC South Today and includes the weekly half-hour Politics South show dedicated to the region.

The region covers television services for Hampshire, Isle of Wight, Berkshire, Oxfordshire, most of Dorset and West Sussex and parts of Buckinghamshire, Wiltshire, Surrey, Northamptonshire and Gloucestershire.

Due to the size of Surrey, the listenership of BBC Radio Surrey is covered by both BBC London, BBC South East and BBC South.

The television output also produces occasional regional documentaries, the such as Titanic – Southampton Remembers and Sea City. The former, broadcast in April 2012, looks at the impact of the disaster on Southampton, where most of the ships staff were recruited while Sea City looks behind the scenes at Southampton Docks and was broadcast in January 2013 with a second series in March 2014.

=== Radio ===
The region is home to local radio stations BBC Radio Oxford, BBC Radio Berkshire and BBC Radio Solent.

Radio Solent, BBC Radio Oxford and Radio Berkshire broadcast between 5 am and 1 am with local programming broadcast between 5 am and 7 pm on weekdays. The three stations carry networked programming with the two stations in the BBC South East region every evening. The stations also simulcast overnight programming from BBC Radio 5 Live each night after closedown.

=== Digital ===
BBC South produces online articles and video for Hampshire, Isle of Wight, Oxfordshire, Dorset and Berkshire which featured on BBC News Online, as well as producing content for the region's social media accounts.

Text-based red button services come from the articles produced for the BBC website.

== History ==
The BBC's television news operation in Southampton began on 5 January 1961 with the launch of South at Six, presented by Martin Muncaster, who had defected from Southern Television. The programme was later renamed as South Today. In 1967, Bruce Parker joined BBC South and went on to become its longest-serving presenter, anchoring South Today for over 30 years.

In 1969, South Today became part of Nationwide, with its own opt-out section of the main programme for local news. In 1984, following the end of the short-lived Nationwide replacement Sixty Minutes, South Today became a standalone programme, competing heavily ever since with the long-defunctTVS news programme Coast to Coast and the present incumbent ITV News Meridian.

The region itself has changed in size and shape on a few occasions. On 16 October 2000, areas served by the Oxford transmitter were transferred from the large former BBC South East region, served by news programme Newsroom South East, and transferred to an opt out of the BBC South region served by South Today. Additionally, following the digital switchover of the Whitehawk Hill transmitter on 7 March 2012, Brighton and Hove transferred to the coverage of BBC South East.

== Studios ==
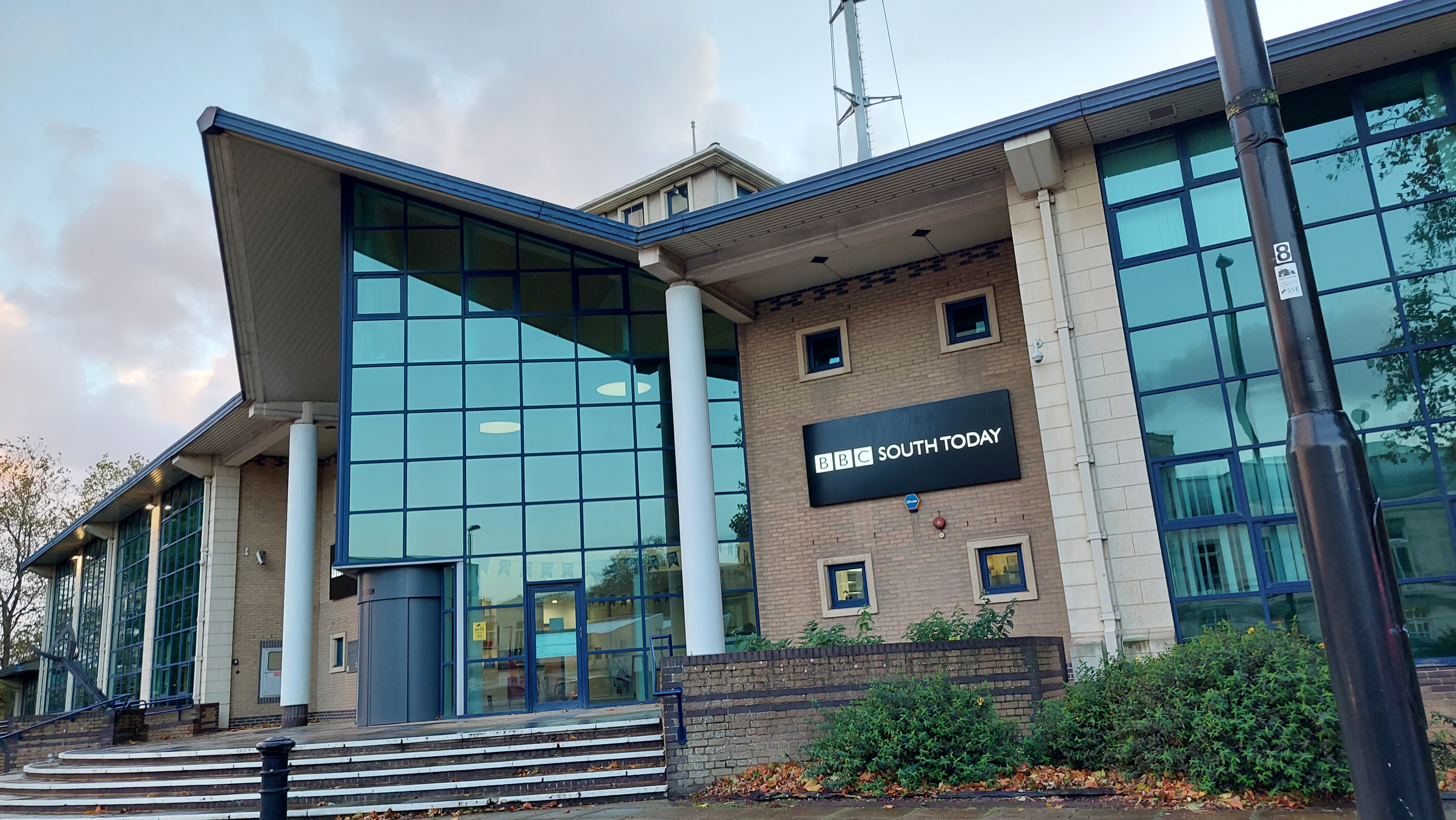
BBC South's studio centre at Broadcasting House on Havelock Road, Southampton

BBC South's regional broadcasting centre is based in Southampton, with local radio and television studios also in Brighton, Dorchester, Guildford, Oxford, Reading and Swindon.

Prior to moving to the current studios in 1991, BBC South was based next to the disused Southampton Terminus railway station at South Western House, a former grand hotel set up to cater for first class passengers using the transatlantic liners from Southampton and latterly used as a military HQ during the planning of the D-day landings. The building was famed for its clear views of Southampton docks, making events such as the departure of the Queen Mary easy to film, as cameras only had to set up on the roof of the building, though the technology used at South Western House was famed for its unreliability, as most of this equipment was second hand and brought in from other BBC buildings. The introduction of colour television in the early 1970s led to a major reconstruction of the building, which had a main studio (used largely for South Today) and a small presentation studio for news bulletins and continuity – unusually, the camera for the small studio was situated in the outside corridor and looking into the room.

In 1991, BBC South moved into new, purpose-built facilities at Havelock Road in Southampton. The new studios were built on to the side of the hill at the top of the city with the railway tunnel running directly underneath. This slope meant that the new television studios were far larger than the previous ones, as they could take up vast amounts of space on a lower level. The new facilities also included brand new equipment and technology, radio studios for BBC Radio Solent and editing suites.

The extra space was because BBC South, at the time, was one of the new regional production centres. Previously production centres had been in the large regions with studio facilities, these being the nations, BBC Midlands, BBC North West and BBC West. However, some smaller production centres were being trialled in the South and the North East. As a result, the new studio was made slightly larger so that it could accommodate a network production.

The complex has two studios.

- Studio A – a 1,929.6 sq ft (179.27 m^{2}) multi-purpose production studio used primarily for South Today. A is audience capable and has a separate dedicated scene-dock.
- Studio B – a smaller studio originally used for the Oxford opt-out. It is occasionally used by South Today during maintenance in the larger studio A.

A small studio at Gunwharf Quays in Portsmouth was closed in June 2020, as part of a wider programme of cost reduction across BBC English Regions.

== See also ==
- BBC English Regions
- BBC South Today
- BBC Radio Berkshire
- BBC Radio Oxford
- BBC Radio Solent
- BBC Radio Wiltshire
