= BBC Radio Gloucestershire =

- Gloucester; England
- Broadcast area: Gloucestershire except South Gloucestershire
- Frequencies: FM: 95.0 MHz (Stroud); FM: 95.8 MHz (Cirencester); FM: 104.7 MHz (Gloucester, Cheltenham and Tewkesbury); AM: 1413 kHz (Forest of Dean and Stroud District) (until the end of November 2026); DAB: 10C; Freeview: 716
- RDS: BBC GLOS

Programming
- Language: English
- Format: Local news, talk and music

Ownership
- Owner: BBC Local Radio, BBC West, BBC West Midlands

History
- First air date: 3 October 1988
- Former frequencies: 603 MW; 1413 MW (north Cotswolds)

Technical information
- Licensing authority: Ofcom

Links
- Website: BBC Radio Gloucestershire

BBC Radio Gloucestershire is the BBC's local radio station serving the county of Gloucestershire.

It broadcasts on FM, DAB, AM (until the end of November 2026), digital TV and via BBC Sounds from studios at Portland Court in Gloucester.

According to RAJAR, the station has a weekly audience of 59,000 listeners as of May 2025.

== Technical ==
The main FM transmitter is at Churchdown Hill near to jct 11 on the M5 which broadcasts on 104.7 FM to Gloucester, Cheltenham and Tewkesbury. The FM output is relayed from the Stroud transmitter on 95 FM and from the Cirencester transmitter on 95.8 FM.

The station commenced broadcasting on DAB digital radio on 18 October 2013 as part of the Gloucestershire local multiplex. The DAB transmitters are located at Churchdown Hill (for the Severn Vale, including the Cheltenham/Gloucester conurbation), Stockend Wood (for south of Gloucester, parts of Stroud Valleys and shores of the River Severn), Icomb Hill, near Bourton-on-the-Water (for the north Cotswolds) and Cirencester (for the south Cotswolds).

The AM transmitter is at Berkeley Heath and broadcasts on 1413 kHz to the Forest of Dean, Dursley and Stroud valleys; this transmitter features a diesel generator to ensure transmissions continue in a power failure. As part of the final phase of medium wave switch-offs of BBC Local Radio, this transmitter will be turned off by the end of November 2026. AM transmissions from Stow-on-the-Wold to the north Cotswolds have already ceased on 7 June 2021.

The station is also available on Freeview TV channel 716 in the BBC West, BBC West Midlands and BBC South regions. Audio heard on Freeview is the same as the FM output.

The station is available to stream online around the world via BBC Sounds. Audio heard on BBC Sounds is the same as FM output. Most football commentaries cannot be heard online due to rights restrictions, but FA Cup football games can be heard online in the UK. Most Gloucester Rugby games can be heard worldwide with the exception of European Champions Cup games which can only be heard in the UK.

Listeners in South Gloucestershire cannot get FM signals that broadcast BBC Radio Gloucestershire. The area is officially served by BBC Radio Bristol which broadcasts on 94.9 FM from the Dundry East transmitter but Radio Gloucestershire is still available on DAB.

== Programming ==
Local programming is produced and broadcast from the BBC's Gloucester studios from 6 am to 2 pm on Mondays to Fridays. The afternoon programme is shared with BBC Radio Wiltshire and the weekday evening shows (6 pm to 10 pm) are all broadcast across the BBC West area with the exception of sport programmes. Manny Masih's Monday evening programme originates in Gloucester.

Weekend programmes from 6am to 2pm are shared regionally across the BBC West area. The breakfast show is presented from Gloucester. The Saturday afternoon sport programme (2pm to 6pm) broadcasts only to Gloucestershire and splits frequencies when multiple commentaries are broadcast. The Sunday afternoon programme (2pm to 6pm) is nationally syndicated output.

The weekend 1800 to 2200 programmes on a Saturday are both broadcast across the BBC West area with the Sunday evening programme in that time slot being a national programme from London.

The late show, airing from 10 pm to 1 am, is a national programme originating in either Manchester or London.

BBC Radio Gloucestershire simulcasts overnight programming from BBC Radio 5 Live from 1am to 6am.
