= BBC Radio Surrey =

BBC Local Radio service for the English county of Surrey

Coordinates: 51°14′45.65″N 0°36′9.42″W

- Guildford; England
- Broadcast area: Surrey and north-east Hampshire
- Frequencies: FM: 104.0 MHz (Redhill, Reigate, Crawley and East Grinstead); FM: 104.6 MHz (Guildford and Godalming); DAB: 10C (Surrey and South London); Freeview: 714
- RDS: BBCSURRY

Programming
- Language: English
- Format: Local news, talk and music

Ownership
- Owner: BBC Local Radio; BBC South East; BBC London; BBC South

History
- First air date: 14 November 1991
- Former names: BBC Southern Counties Radio (1994–2009); BBC Surrey (2009–2020)
- Former frequencies: AM: 1368 kHz (Reigate & Crawley)

Technical information
- Licensing authority: Ofcom

Links
- Website: BBC Radio Surrey

BBC Radio Surrey is the BBC's local radio station serving Surrey and north-east Hampshire.

It broadcasts on FM, DAB, digital TV and via BBC Sounds from studios at the University of Surrey in Guildford.

According to RAJAR, BBC Radio Surrey and BBC Radio Sussex share a combined weekly audience of 192,000 listeners and a 3.7% share as of December 2023.

== History ==
=== BBC Radio Surrey (1991–1994) ===
Originally planned as a stand-alone radio station, it launched on 14 November 1991 as a limited opt-out service of BBC Radio Sussex, broadcasting from newly built studios on the campus of the University of Surrey in Guildford. However it was never able to build a substantial audience and the two stations were merged in January 1994, becoming BBC Radio Sussex and Surrey, and the station moved into the Guildford studios.

=== BBC Southern Counties Radio (1994–2009) ===
On 1 August 1994, the station's name was changed to BBC Southern Counties Radio. At first it ran a single all-talk schedule across Sussex and Surrey. However, in September 1997, a dedicated breakfast show for Surrey was reintroduced, followed by a drivetime show in April 2006. Apart from a brief period in 2006, the former BBC Radio Sussex transmitter at Reigate on 104.0 FM was now used for the Surrey output, in order to give better reception for listeners in East Surrey. BBC SCR became BBC Sussex and BBC Surrey on 30 March 2009. Though the two stations broadcast on different frequencies, the infrastructure and management teams remained unaffected.

=== BBC Radio Surrey (2020–present) ===
On 30 March 2020, the station reverted to its original name of BBC Radio Surrey.

== Technical ==
BBC Radio Surrey is transmitted on FM and on DAB via the MuxCo Surrey multiplex, which officially launched on 12 December 2013.

The station also broadcast on 1368 kHz medium wave (219 metres) from a transmitter located at Duxhurst, situated between Reigate and Horley. The transmitter closed on 3 January 2018 as a cost saving measure from the BBC as part of its plan to switch off thirteen BBC Local Radio medium wave transmitters.

- Analogue VHF FM
  - 104.0 MHz - Redhill, Reigate, Crawley and East Grinstead (Reigate transmitter)
  - 104.6 MHz - Guildford (Guildford transmitter)
- DAB Digital Radio: Block 10C 213.36 MHz
  - Reigate & Crawley (Reigate transmitter)
  - Guildford (Guildford transmitter)
  - South West London (Crystal Palace transmitter)
  - Farnham & Aldershot (Hungry Hill transmitter)
  - Leatherhead (Stoke d'Abernon transmitter)
- Analogue medium wave AM
  - 1368 kHz - Reigate & Crawley (Duxhurst transmitter) [Ceased 03/01/2018]

The station also broadcasts on Freeview TV channel 714 in the BBC London and BBC South East regions and streams online via BBC Sounds.

== Programming ==
Local programming airs from the BBC's Guildford studios from 6 am to 10 am on Mondays to Saturdays and from 2 pm to 6 pm on Saturdays.

Regional programming, shared with BBC Radio Sussex, airs from 10 am to 10 pm on weekdays, from 10 am to 2 pm and 8 pm to 10 pm on Saturdays and from 6 am to 6 pm and 10 pm to 1 am on Sundays.

Off-peak programming, including the weekday late show from 10 pm to 1 am, originates from BBC Radio Solent in Southampton and BBC Radio Berkshire in Reading.

During the station's downtime, BBC Radio Surrey simulcasts overnight programming from BBC Radio 5 Live and BBC Radio London.
