= BBC West =

BBC Region in west of England

Coordinates: 51.4611°N 2.6080°W

- BBC West's area within the UK
- TV transmitters: Mendip
- Radio stations: BBC Radio Bristol; BBC Radio Gloucestershire; BBC Radio Wiltshire; BBC Radio Somerset
- Headquarters: Broadcasting House, 31–33 Whiteladies Rd, Bristol BS8 2LR,
- Area: Bristol; Somerset; Wiltshire (majority); Gloucestershire (majority) northern Dorset
- Nation: BBC English Regions
- Regions: West
- Launch date: 1933

BBC West is one of the BBC's English Regions serving Bristol, Somerset, the majority of Wiltshire and Gloucestershire and north of Dorset.

== Services ==
=== Television ===
BBC West's television service (broadcast on BBC One) consists of the flagship regional news service BBC Points West and a 30 minute political programme Sunday Politics.

=== Radio ===
The region has four local radio stations; BBC Radio Bristol, BBC Radio Gloucestershire, BBC Radio Somerset & BBC Radio Wiltshire. They broadcast local programming every weekday between 6 am and 2 pm. Bristol and Somerset share one programme between 2 pm and 6 pm with Gloucestershire and Wiltshire sharing another. All carry local news bulletins during shared afternoon programmes although one station per programme will play out a pre-recorded bulletin.

Evening weekday programmes are shared regionally across all four stations. A national late show from Manchester or London is then broadcast between 10 pm and 1 am.

Weekend programmes are shared, regional or national apart from Saturday afternoon sport between 2 pm and 6 pm.

=== Online and interactive ===
BBC West also produces online content for BBC News web pages and related social media platforms.

== History ==
BBC West launched a regional television service from Bristol on 30 September 1957. Initially broadcast from the Wenvoe transmitter on the outskirts of Cardiff, the geographical nature of the Wenvoe signal meant the first regional news bulletins were broadcast to both Wales and the West of England, sharing a ten-minute timeslot with News from Wales.

Until December 1960, news bulletins from Bristol also served the south coast of England, which latterly received its own regional programme. The weekday timeslot for regional news extended to 25 minutes in September 1962 – around this time, the West of England bulletin became known as Points West while the Welsh bulletins received a more comprehensive relaunch as BBC Wales Today.

The opening of a second signal from Wenvoe in February 1964 finally allowed the split of BBC television in Wales and the West. A separate BBC Wales channel was launched while BBC West became a full regional opt-out service to the extent seen in other English regions, with Points West becoming a full-length programme.

Points West continued until 1991, when the service was renamed BBC News West. The Points West brand was revived on Monday 22 May 2000 with the launch of the BBC's generic regional news graphics and presentation.

== Studios ==
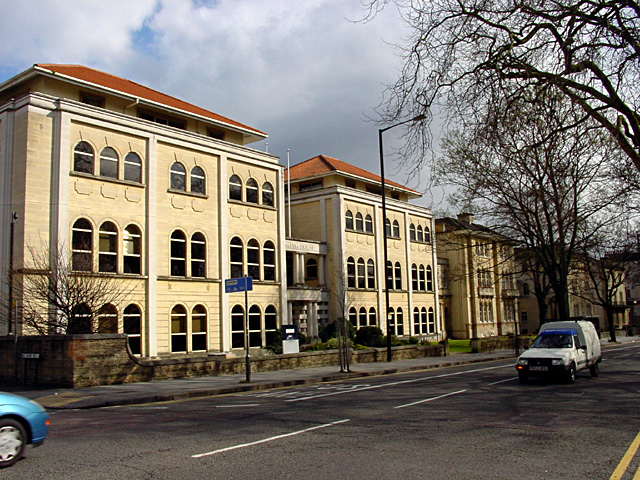
BBC West's Bristol headquarters

BBC West's regional broadcasting centre is located on Whiteladies Road in the Clifton area of Bristol with local radio studios and television bureaux also in Bath, Gloucester, Swindon and Taunton.

The Bristol studios are the main base for Points West, BBC Radio Bristol and various regional and, previously, network programmes. Network output is now made at other specially built facilities or does not use a studio. The site originally had two studios, A and B, which catered for all output - network programming was produced from Studio A and Points West and other regional output from Studio B. Studio A was closed in 1991 as a cost-saving measure, and in 1996 the site was altered so that new gallery facilities were inserted into part of Studio A. The now smaller Studio A is now used for Points West, while Studio B has been demolished.

== See also ==
- BBC English Regions
- BBC Radio Bristol
- BBC Radio Gloucestershire
- BBC Radio Wiltshire
- BBC Radio Somerset
