= BBC Three Counties Radio =

Local radio for Beds, Herts & Bucks

Coordinates: 51.877°N 0.418°W

- Dunstable; England
- Broadcast area: Bedfordshire, Hertfordshire and Buckinghamshire
- Frequencies: FM: 90.4 MHz (Welwyn Garden City, Hertford and Stevenage); FM: 92.1 MHz (Hemel Hempstead, Watford and St Albans); FM: 94.7 MHz (Aylesbury); FM: 95.5 MHz (Bedford and Hitchin); FM: 98.0 MHz (High Wycombe); FM: 103.8 MHz (Luton and Dunstable); FM: 104.5 MHz (Milton Keynes and Buckingham); DAB: 10D; Freeview: 712
- RDS: BBC 3CR

Programming
- Language: English
- Format: Local news, talk and music

Ownership
- Owner: BBC Local Radio, BBC East, BBC London, BBC South

History
- First air date: 24 June 1985
- Former names: BBC Radio Bedfordshire (1985–1993)

Technical information
- Licensing authority: Ofcom

Links
- Website: www.bbc.co.uk/threecountiesradio

BBC Three Counties Radio is the BBC's local radio station serving the counties of Bedfordshire, Hertfordshire and Buckinghamshire.

It broadcasts on FM, DAB, digital TV and via BBC Sounds from studios at Grove Park in Dunstable.

According to RAJAR, the station has a weekly audience of 125,000 listeners and a 5.8% share as of December 2023.

== History ==
=== BBC Radio Bedfordshire (1985–1993) ===
Radio Bedfordshire logo

The station launched as "Radio Bedfordshire" on 24 June 1985, serving the whole of Bedfordshire plus (despite the name) North Buckinghamshire and the northern parts of Hertfordshire. Therefore Bedford, Luton, Dunstable, Milton Keynes, Knebworth, Berkhamsted, Tring, Harpenden, Leighton Buzzard, Aylesbury, Hemel Hempstead, St Albans, Hatfield, Welwyn Garden City, Letchworth Garden City, Stevenage and Hitchin were served by the new station. In 1992, the station was temporarily known as "BBC Radio Bedfordshire with Herts and Bucks".

=== BBC Three Counties Radio (1993–present) ===
The station changed to its present name on 5 April 1993. The new name was intended to reflect the wider reach across the three counties and to give equal service to all. The editorial area was not, at that point, expanded but enhanced studio facilities and staff were given to Buckinghamshire and Hertfordshire.

New transmitters at Epping Green and Bedmond extended the coverage area to Welwyn Garden City, Hatfield and west Hertfordshire in late 2005.

BBC Three Counties Radio became available on DAB radio on 14 February 2013. In June 2015, the station moved from its Luton base to new studios in Dunstable.

== Programming ==
Local programming is produced and broadcast from the BBC's Dunstable studios from 6 am to 2 pm weekdays. Weekdays from 2 pm to 10 pm are BBC East regional programming. Saturday 6 am to 10 pm BBC East shared programming. Sundays 6 am to 6 pm BBC East regional shared programming. Many of the regional shows are broadcast from the studios of Three Counties Radio. All other times such as late and overnight programming is England-wide shared programming.

== Presenters ==
=== Notable current presenters ===
- Andy Collins (weekday breakfast)
- Jonathan Vernon-Smith - presents the JVS show daily, which features consumer issues help, music and popular topics.

=== Notable past presenters ===
- Nana Akua
- Jon Gaunt
- Tony Hadley
- Iain Lee (former Breakfast Show presenter, 2012-2015)
- Gordon Astley
- Nick Lawrence (former Breakfast Show presenter, ex-Chiltern FM)
- John Radford
- Stephen Rhodes (former breakfast / consumer show presenter)
- Dave Lee Travis (former Sunday morning presenter)
- David Prever
