= BBC Southern Counties Radio =

Former BBC Local Radio service for Surrey and Sussex

- Brighton and Guildford; England
- Broadcast area: Surrey and Sussex
- Frequencies: FM: 95.0 MHz (Newhaven); FM: 95.1 MHz (Horsham); FM: 95.3 MHz (Brighton and Worthing); FM: 104.0 MHz (Reigate and Crawley); FM: 104.5 MHz (East and West Sussex, including Eastbourne); FM: 104.6 MHz (Guildford); FM: 104.8 MHz (Chichester); AM: 1161 kHz (East Sussex); AM: 1368 kHz (Reigate and Crawley); AM: 1485 kHz (Southern West Sussex); DAB: 10B (NOW Sussex Coast)

Programming
- Language: English
- Format: Local news, talk and music

Ownership
- Owner: BBC Local Radio, BBC South, BBC South East

History
- First air date: 1 August 1994
- Last air date: 30 March 2009

Links
- Website: BBC Southern Counties Radio

BBC Southern Counties Radio (BBC SCR) was the BBC Local Radio service for the English counties of Surrey and Sussex. The station also covered a large part of north-east Hampshire. It was the first BBC local radio station to introduce an all-speech format. It broadcast from studios in Brighton and Guildford on FM and AM, and on DAB on the NOW Sussex Coast multiplex.

== History ==
The station was formed by the merger of BBC Radio Sussex and BBC Radio Surrey. It began on 1 August 1994.

BBC Radio Sussex had originally been founded on 14 February 1968 as BBC Radio Brighton, broadcasting from studios in Marlborough Place. Des Lynam was one of the original presenters. It expanded to cover the whole of Sussex in October 1983.

BBC Radio Surrey had a chequered history. Once planned as a stand-alone radio station, it eventually launched on 14 November 1991 as a limited opt-out service of BBC Radio Sussex, broadcasting from newly built studios on the campus of the University of Surrey in Guildford. However it was never able to build a substantial audience over its two years on air.

The two stations were merged in January 1994 and moved into the Guildford studios; a bone of contention for many Brighton residents who felt they were being deprived of the local station they had enjoyed since 1968. Their campaign to bring the station back to Brighton was to succeed twelve years later.

Initially called BBC Radio Sussex and Surrey, the station relaunched with the name BBC Southern Counties Radio on 1 August 1994. It became the first BBC local radio station to adopt an all-speech format, with the broadcast slogan "all talk all the time" and was on air daily from 5am to 1am. Presenters included Gordon Astley, Tommy Boyd, Peter Heaton-Jones, Adrian Love, Al Clarke, Alison Taylor and Eric Dixon; however there were to be numerous presenter and schedule changes over the following three years.

The next revamp occurred on 1 September 1997, when the station reverted to a more traditional mix of talk and music, and introduced new presenters such as Chris Ashley, John Radford, Giles Dilnot, Bill Buckley and Simon Bates, who presented the Sunday morning show.

Further changes followed, including the departure in 2005 of Brighton Breakfast Show presenter JoAnne Good who left to work at BBC London 94.9 and was replaced by Sarah Gorrell. Good also left her Saturday morning show and was replaced by Brighton comedian Stephen Grant. Tommy Boyd was recruited, initially to present an adult-style programme on Saturday evenings.

The station was relaunched in April 2006. Its headquarters were relocated from Guildford to Brighton, and the station was referred to on air as "The New Sound of Sussex and Surrey". Four of the presenters, Bill Buckley, John Radford, Ed Douglas and Dominic Busby left the station shortly before the relaunch of 2006. Three presenters were recruited and started broadcasting on the station on 3 April 2006, the day of the relaunch: Gordon Astley was taken on to present daily shows, just as he had done in the 1990s; Fred Marden was recruited to present the Surrey breakfast show; and one-time Radio Sussex sports reporter Richard Lindfield also rejoined. By early February 2009, all three had left the station and the designation "The New Sound of Sussex and Surrey" was no longer being used on air by presenters.

== BBC Sussex and BBC Surrey relaunch ==
BBC SCR became BBC Sussex and BBC Surrey on 30 March 2009. Though the two stations broadcast on different frequencies, the infrastructure and management teams remained unaffected.

== Brighton Festival and Fringe ==
Increasingly, in its latter years, BBC SCR worked to provide extensive and interactive coverage of the Brighton Festival and Fringe. Aside from dedicating a daily hour-long show to Brighton's festivals, it also provided in-depth internet coverage, including reviews, features and video clips.

== Split programming ==
From September 1997, there were separate news services for Sussex and Surrey, and separate breakfast shows for both counties, using a split frequency system. Until the April 2006 changes, a separate service for Brighton, Hove and Worthing was also provided. A one-hour drivetime programme and Saturday breakfast show for Surrey were introduced at this point - however the Surrey output was now only available to listeners in the west of the county, on 104.6 FM. The 104.0 FM frequency, which covers parts of both East Surrey and the north of West Sussex and previously carried the Surrey programming, was switched to carry the Sussex output. The reasoning behind this was to give listeners in Crawley and East Grinstead a more relevant service, at the expense of those in East Surrey where audience figures have been in decline, but from 16 October 2006, 104.0 FM reverted to the Surrey output. In addition, to reaffirm its commitment to Surrey listeners, the Surrey drivetime programme was increased from one to three hours.

There were also separate sports shows on Saturday afternoon, allowing listeners in north-east Hampshire and Surrey could listen to live commentaries from the local Conference teams, Aldershot Town, Woking and Crawley Town, whilst listeners in Sussex could listen to Brighton's games.

== Notable on-air staff ==
- Gordon Astley
- Simon Bates
- Tommy Boyd
- Bill Buckley
- Giles Dilnot
- JoAnne Good
- Stephen Grant
- Peter Heaton-Jones
- Adrian Love
- John Radford
- Paul Ross

== Top Gear ==
On Wednesday 26 April 2006, Top Gear presenters Jeremy Clarkson, James May and Richard Hammond presented the drivetime show from the Brighton studio. The feature was broadcast in the second episode of Series 8 on 14 May 2006.

== Networked and simulcast programming ==
Evening programming throughout the week was networked with counterpart BBC local radio stations in the south and south east (namely Radio Solent, Radio Berkshire, Radio Oxford and Radio Kent). During the station's downtime, SCR simulcasted BBC Radio 5 Live programming including Up All Night, Morning Reports and the Stephen Nolan show.
