= BBC Radio Sussex =

BBC Local Radio service for the English county of Sussex

- Brighton; England
- Broadcast area: East and West Sussex
- Frequencies: FM: 95.0 MHz (Newhaven, Peacehaven and Seaford); FM: 95.1 MHz (Horsham); FM: 95.3 MHz (Brighton & Hove, Shoreham-By-Sea and Worthing); FM: 104.5 MHz (Eastbourne, Hastings, Haywards Heath, Lewes and East Sussex); FM: 104.8 MHz (Chichester and West Sussex); DAB: 10B (NOW Sussex Coast); Freeview: 712

Programming
- Language: English
- Format: Local news, talk and music

Ownership
- Owner: BBC Local Radio, BBC South East, BBC South

History
- First air date: 14 February 1968
- Former names: BBC Radio Brighton (1968–1983); BBC Southern Counties Radio (1994–2009); BBC Sussex (2009–2020)
- Former frequencies: AM: 1161 kHz (East Sussex - Bexhill); AM: 1485 kHz (West Sussex - Southwick)

Technical information
- Licensing authority: Ofcom
- Transmitter coordinates: 50.8266430°N 0.1422775°W

Links
- Website: BBC Radio Sussex

BBC Radio Sussex is the BBC's local radio station serving the counties of East and West Sussex.

It broadcasts on FM, DAB, digital TV and via BBC Sounds from studios on Queens Road in Brighton.

According to RAJAR, BBC Radio Surrey and BBC Radio Sussex share a combined weekly audience of 192,000 listeners and a 3.7% share as of December 2023.

== History ==
=== BBC Radio Brighton (1968–1983) ===
BBC Radio Brighton was one of the first wave of BBC Local Radio stations which took to the air during the late 1960s. Broadcasting from Marlborough Place, it officially opened on 14 February 1968, though a short-lived emergency service had been broadcast during the blizzards earlier that winter. Originally broadcast on 88.1 MHz VHF only, the station later acquired a medium wave frequency of 202m, and transferred to 95.3 MHz on VHF. The transmission area was initially restricted to little more than the immediate Brighton and Hove conurbation, with the surrounding suburbs. However, coverage was extended to include Worthing in the late 1970s.

In common with much of the BBC's early local radio output, Radio Brighton broadcast only for limited daytime hours in its early years, relying on BBC Radio 2 and BBC Radio 4 for a sustaining service, but building to a full daytime service by the mid-1970s. In the early years, the emphasis was on structured programmes rather than the open-ended magazine shows which have since become more common. The flagship was the breakfast news programme Coastwise.

=== BBC Radio Sussex (1983–1994) ===
On 22 October 1983, as part of the BBC's move to extend its local radio network across the UK, the station expanded further to include the entire county. As a result, the 'Radio Brighton' name was dropped in favour of the more accurate BBC Radio Sussex.

=== BBC Southern Counties Radio (1994–2009) ===
In 1994, BBC Radio Sussex merged with a later arrival, BBC Radio Surrey, to form BBC Southern Counties Radio. At first it ran a single all-talk schedule across Sussex and Surrey. However, in September 1997, two dedicated breakfast shows were introduced, one for Brighton and Hove on the 95.3 FM frequency and another for the remainder of Sussex. The separate breakfast show for Brighton and Hove was discontinued in April 2006.

=== BBC Sussex (2009–2020) ===
In March 2009, the county name returned to the radio station name when BBC Sussex became the new name for BBC Southern Counties Radio across Sussex. BBC Sussex and its sister station BBC Surrey continue effectively to operate as one station, with no change in management or infrastructure from its predecessor.

On 3 January 2018, BBC Sussex stopped transmitting on 1161 kHz and 1485 kHz medium wave.

=== BBC Radio Sussex (2020–present) ===
On 30 March 2020, the station reverted to its earlier name of BBC Radio Sussex.

== Technical ==
- Analogue VHF FM
  - 95.0 MHz - Newhaven
  - 95.1 MHz - Horsham
  - 95.3 MHz - Brighton and Hove and Worthing (Whitehawk Hill transmitter)
  - 104.5 MHz - East Sussex (Heathfield transmitter)
  - 104.8 MHz - West Sussex (Burton Down transmitter)
- DAB Digital Radio: Block 10B 211.648 MHz
  - Worthing (Findon transmitter)
  - Newhaven
  - Horsham
  - Hastings
  - Eastbourne (Heathfield transmitting station)
  - Chichester (Burton Down transmitter)
  - Brighton (Whitehawk Hill transmitter)
  - Crawley (Little Prestwood Farm transmitter)
  - East Sussex (Heathfield transmitting station)
  - Central Sussex (Truleigh Hill transmitter)
  - Rye (Rye transmitter)
  - Midhurst (Midhurst transmitting station)
- Analogue medium wave AM
  - 1161 kHz - East Sussex (Bexhill transmitter) [Ceased 03/01/2018]
  - 1485 kHz - West Sussex (Southwick transmitter) [Ceased 03/01/2018]

There used to be two medium wave transmitters that carried BBC Radio Sussex. The station transmitted on 1485 kHz (202 metres) in West Sussex from the Southwick transmitting station and on 1161 kHz (258 metres) in East Sussex from the Bexhill transmitting station. The two transmitters closed on 3 January 2018 as a cost saving measure from the BBC as part of its plan to switch off thirteen BBC Local Radio medium wave transmitters.

The station also broadcasts on Freeview TV channel 712 in the BBC South East and BBC South regions and streams online via BBC Sounds.

Listeners in Crawley and parts of East Grinstead cannot receive FM signals that broadcast BBC Radio Sussex. However, those areas receive better FM signals from the Reigate transmitter which broadcasts BBC Radio Surrey on 104.0 FM or they can receive Radio Sussex on DAB.

== Programming ==
Local programming airs from the BBC's Brighton studios from 6 am to 10 am on Mondays to Saturdays and from 2 pm to 6 pm on Saturdays.

Regional programming, shared with BBC Radio Surrey, airs from 10 am to 10 pm on weekdays, from 10 am to 2 pm and 8 pm to 10 pm on Saturdays and from 6 am to 6 pm and 10 pm to 1 am on Sundays.

Off-peak programming, including the weekday late show from 10 pm to 1 am, originates from BBC Radio Solent in Southampton and BBC Radio Berkshire in Reading.

During the station's downtime, BBC Radio Sussex simulcasts overnight programming from BBC Radio 5 Live and BBC Radio London.

=== Sports coverage ===
BBC Radio Sussex covers every Brighton and Hove Albion and Crawley Town game live. On Saturdays, BBC Sussex Sport starts at 2pm from wherever Brighton are playing. This show contains interviews and features on all sports from within the county. The frequencies then split shortly before kick off, with Brighton's match on DAB, 95.0, 95.3 and 104.5 FM, and Crawley on the remaining frequencies.

When non-traditional kick off times occur, the main presenter for the club in question presents a BBC Sussex sports special on midweek evenings.

== Notable personnel ==
- Kate Adie
- David Arscott
- Gavin Ashenden
- Roger Day
- Michael Fabricant
- Bob Gunnell
- Des Lynam
- Bob Simpson
