= Radio Academy Awards =

British radio industry awards (1983–2014)

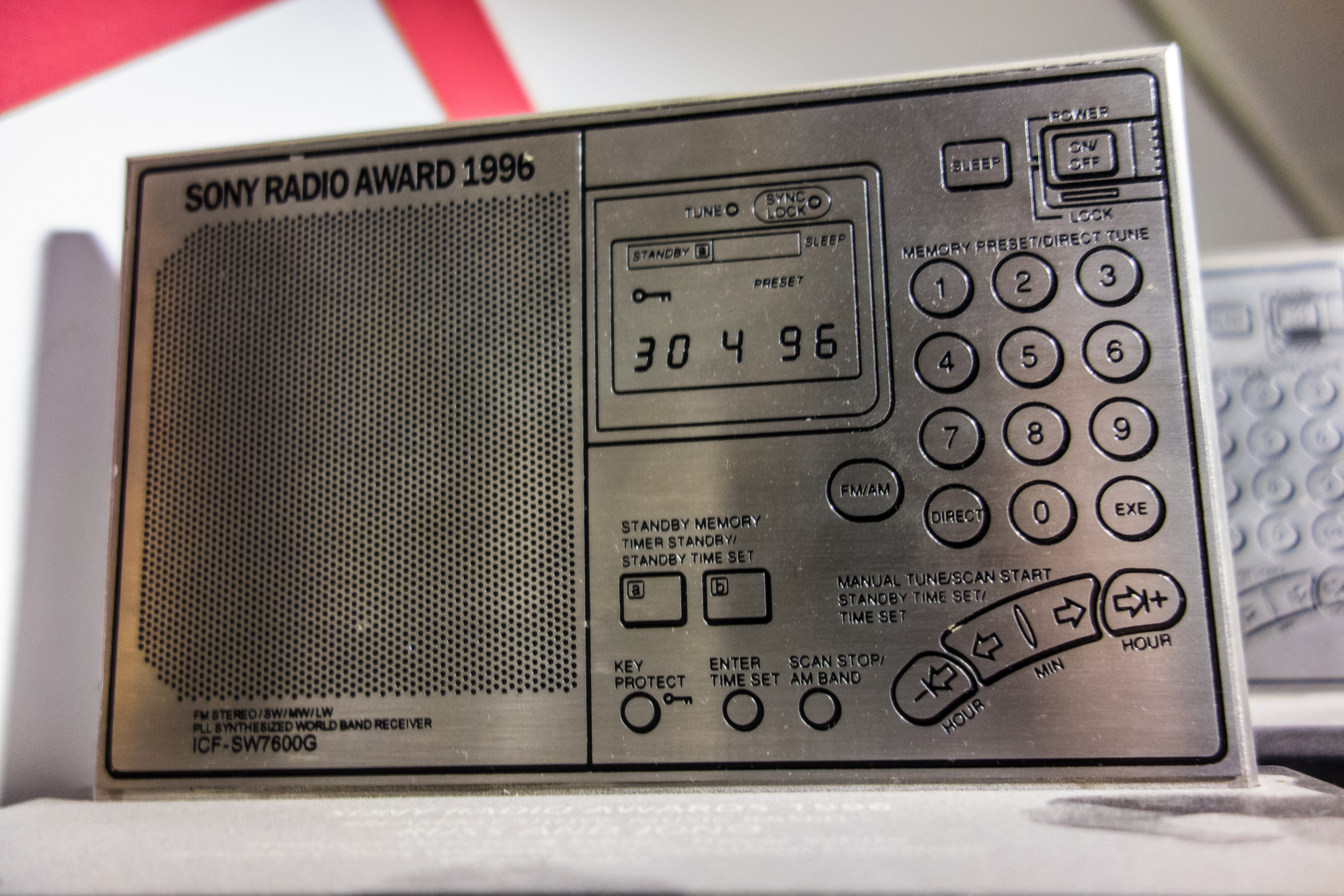
- Sony Radio Award, presented to Virgin Radio in 1996
- Awarded for: Excellence in the radio industry
- Sponsored by: Sony (until 2013)
- Country: United Kingdom
- Presented by: ZAFER Associates; The Radio Academy
- Formerly called: The Sony Radio Awards
- First award: 1983; 43 years ago
- Final award: 2014; 12 years ago
- Website: radioacademy.org
- Related: The ARIAS

The Radio Academy Awards, started in 1983, were the most prestigious awards in the British radio industry. For most of their existence, they were run by ZAFER Associates, but in latter years were brought under the control of The Radio Academy.

The awards were generally referred to by the name of their first sponsor, Sony, as the Sony Awards, the Sony Radio Awards or other variations. In August 2013, Sony announced the end of its sponsorship agreement with the Radio Academy after 32 years. Consequently, the awards were simply named the Radio Academy Awards. In November 2014, it was announced that The Radio Academy would not be holding the awards in 2015, and would be looking for other ways to recognise achievement in the future.

The awards were relaunched in 2016 as the Audio & Radio Industry Awards (ARIAS).

== Awards format ==
The awards were organised into various categories, with nominees being announced a few weeks before the main awards ceremony. The categories varied slightly each year, and were decided by an annual committee, with the aim to include all the main areas from music, news and speech through to radio drama, comedy and sport, and not discriminating against station size, or niche categories.

In most categories, five entries were shortlisted with the top three awarded Bronze, Silver and Gold. Some categories (such as the Station of the Year categories) only three entries were shortlisted, with only a Gold winner awarded. In a number of special categories (such as The Gold Award or Special Award) there was no shortlist, merely a winner.

== 1983 Gold Award winners ==
Category	Winner	Station/Organisation	Refs
Outstanding contribution to radio over the years	Frank Muir and Denis Norden		
Best actress	Mary Riggans for Till All the Seas Run Dry	Radio Clyde	
Best actor	John Nettles for Mirror Image	BBC Radio 3	
Female personality of the year	Sue MacGregor		
Male personality of the year	Brian Johnston		
Local radio personality of the year	Richard Park	Radio Clyde	
National DJ of the year	Mike Read	BBC Radio 1	
Local DJ of the year	Tim Lloyd	Essex Radio	
Reporter of the year	Michael Elkins	BBC News	
Sports broadcaster of the year	Clive Tyldesley	Radio City	
Society of Authors award for best drama script	The Journal of Vassilije Bogdanovic, written by Alan Plater	BBC World Service	
Technical excellence and achievement	Dark Heritage, (Note: A play by Catherine Hughes, telling the story of a young girl whose life is changed by the tragedies of the Gresford Colliery disaster in 1934 and, many years later, the Aberfan disaster in 1966. First broadcast on 29 March 1982. The play combines two of Hughes' poems about the disasters.) produced by Jane Morgan	BBC Radio 4	
Best children's programme	Listening Corner	BBC Radio 4	
Best classical music programme	Decade - The 1800s	BBC Radio 3	
Best community service programme	Break The Silence	Piccadilly Radio	
Best current affairs programme	The World This Weekend	BBC Radio 4	
Best documentary feature	The Rent Boys	Piccadilly Radio	
Best drama production	Over The Hills and Far Away, (Note: A play by Martyn Wade, celebrating the life of the composer Percy Grainger, portrayed by David Healy. First broadcast on 27 December 1982.) produced by Cherry Cookson	BBC Radio 4	
Best light entertainment programme	Radio Active	BBC Radio 4	
Best local radio programme	not awarded		
Best magazine programme	Woman's Hour	BBC Radio 4	
Best popular music programme	Terry Wogan	BBC Radio 2	

== 1984 Gold Award winners ==
Category	Winner	Station/Organisation	Refs
Outstanding contribution to radio over the years	David Jacobs		
Best actress	Maureen O'Brien for The Duchess's Diary and A Month in the Country	BBC Radio 3	
Best actor	Clive Merrison for Luther	BBC Radio 3	
UK female radio personality of the year	Margaret Howard	BBC Radio 4	
UK male radio personality of the year	Brian Matthew	BBC Radio 2	
Local radio personality of the ear	Susie Mathis	Piccadilly Radio	
Special award for services to radio	Lord (Jimmy) Gordon of Strathblane CBE	Radio Clyde	
National DJ of the year	Mike Read	BBC Radio 1	
Local DJ of the year	Timmy Mallett	Piccadilly Radio	
Reporter of the year	Gerald Butt	BBC Radio News	
Sports broadcaster of the year	Charles Lambert	BBC Radio Merseyside	
Society of Authors award for best drama script	Never in My Lifetime, written by Shirley Gee	BBC Radio 3	
Technical excellence and achievement	A Concert from Seoul – live by satellite - Duncan MacEwan	BBC Radio 3	
Best children's programme	In The News	BBC Radio 4	
Best classical music programme	Mr Hallé's Band	Piccadilly Radio	
Best community service programme	Tay Action	Radio Tay	
Best current affairs programme	Today	BBC Radio 4	
Best documentary/features programme	Fat Man at Work	BBC Radio 4	
Best drama production	Road to Rocio (Note: A comedy by Douglas Livingstone about the Romería de El Rocío, with James Bolam, Sara Kestelman, and Michael Kitchen. First broadcast on 16 May 1983, produced by Jane Morgan)	BBC Radio 4	
Best light entertainment programme	Son of Cliché	BBC Radio 4	
Best local radio programme	Love The Bones	Radio City	
Best magazine programme	The Food Programme	BBC Radio 4	
Best outside broadcast programme	Water Skiing Lessons	Wiltshire Radio	
Best popular music programme	Benny Green	BBC Radio 2	

== 1985 Gold Award winners ==
Category	Winner	Station/Organisation	Refs
Outstanding contribution to radio over the years	British Forces Broadcasting Service	BFBS	
Best actress	Glenda Jackson in Scenes From An Execution	BBC Radio 3	
Best actor	David March for Mr Norris Changes Trains	BBC Radio 4	
Radio personality of the year	Jimmy Young	BBC Radio 2	
Local radio personality of the year	Allan Beswick	Red Rose Radio	
Special award for service to radio	Derek Chinnery	BBC Radio 2	
National DJ of the year	Steve Wright	BBC Radio 1	
Local DJ of the year	Tim (Timbo) Bell	Radio Mercury	
Radio reporter of the year	David Loyn	IRN	
Sports broadcaster of the year	Peter Jones	BBC Radio	
Technical excellence and achievement	Hubert Gregg says "Maybe It's Because"	BBC Radio 2	
Best drama script	Scenes from an Execution, written by Howard Barker	BBC Radio 3	
Best children's programme	Gold and Silver	BBC Radio Kent	
Best classical music programme	Deep River	BBC Radio 4	
Best community service programming	In Touch	BBC Radio 4	
Best current affairs programme	Analysis – Post Recession Britain	BBC Radio 4	
Best documentary/features programme	Strathinvar	BBC Radio Scotland	
Best drama production	Titus Groan and Gormenghast	BBC Radio 4	
Best dramatisation	Titus Groan and Gormenghast	BBC Radio 4	
Best light entertainment programme	In One Ear	BBC Radio 4	
Best local radio programme	Kinnock & Scargill in Stoke	BBC Radio Stoke	
Best magazine programme	Festival City Radio	Radio Forth	
Best outside broadcast	The Terry Wogan Olympic Show	BBC Radio 2	
Best popular music programme	Steve Wright in the Afternoon	BBC Radio 1	
Best specialist music programme	Barbed Wireless	BBC Radio Derby	

== 1986 Gold Award winners ==
Category	Winner	Station/Organisation	Refs
Outstanding contribution to radio over the years	John Timpson	BBC Radio 4	
Outstanding service to the community by a local radio station	Bradford City Fire	Pennine Radio	
Best actress	Jane Asher in Winter Journey	BBC Radio Scotland	
Best actor	Ray Smith in A Kind of Hallowe'en	BBC Radio 3	
Radio personality of the year	Douglas Cameron	LBC/IRN	
Local radio personality of the year	Mike Hurley for Bill Bore	BBC Radio Humberside	
Special award for services to radio	Parliamentary Broadcasting	LBC/IRN	
National DJ of the year	John Peel	BBC Radio 1	
Radio reporter of the year	Mark Jordan	Capital Radio	
Sports broadcaster of the year	George Gavin	BRMB	
Technical excellence and achievement	Festival of Nine Lessons and Carols	BBC Radio 4	
Most creative use of radio	Peace on Earth	BBC Radio 1	
Best children's programming	Say No To Strangers?	Radio Aire	
Best classical music programme	Symphonies and Silence	BBC Radio 4	
Best community service programming	Clyde Action: Road Safety Week	Radio Clyde	
Best current affairs programming	File on 4 (South Africa reform or revolution?)	BBC Radio 4	
Best documentary/features programme	Setting Sail	BBC Radio 4	
Best drama production	Hiroshima, The Movie	BBC Radio 4	
Best dramatisation	Munchausen	BBC Radio 4	
Best local radio programme	Goodbye Village School	BBC Radio Wales	
Best magazine programme	Norfolk Air Line	BBC Radio Norfolk	
Best original script	A Kind of Hallowe'en	BBC Radio 3	
Best outside broadcast	Live Aid Concert	BBC Radio 1	
Best popular music programme	Howard Jones at the Manchester Apollo	Piccadilly Radio	
Best specialist music programme	Barbed Wireless: The A & R Man	BBC Radio Derby	
Best use of comedy	Delve Special	BBC Radio 4	

== 1987 Gold Award winners ==
Category	Winner	Station/Organisation	Refs
Best actress	Billie Whitelaw for Vassa Zhelyeznova	BBC Radio 3	
Best actor	Ronald Pickup for The Awful Insulation of Rage	BBC Radio 3	
Outstanding contribution to radio over the years	The Archers		
Outstanding service to the community by a local radio station	Build a Bungalow Appeal	Radio Aire	
Radio personality of the year	Derek Jameson		
Local radio personality of the year	Andy Radford	Severn Sound	
Special award for services to radio	Brian Hayes		
Local DJ of the year	David Jensen	Capital Radio	
National DJ of the year	Mike Smith	BBC Radio 1	
Radio reporter of the year	Graham Leach	BBC Radio	
Radio sport broadcaster of the year	Derek Rae	BBC Radio Scotland	
Technical excellence and achievement	Breakdown	Capital Radio	
Most creative use of radio	Breakdown	Capital Radio	
Best children's programming	The Speaking Clock	BBC Radio Merseyside	
Best classical music programme	The Immortal Bohemiam	BBC Radio 4	
Best community service programming	Community Service Volunteers Compilation	Suffolk Group Radio	
Best current affairs programme	The Aids Plague in East Africa	BBC Radio 4	
Best documentary/feature programme	Hopping Down in Kent	BBC Radio 4	
Best drama production	Mischief	BBC Radio 4	
Best dramatisation	Jude The Obscure	BBC Radio 4	
Best local radio programme	Aberfan – An Unknown Spring	Swansea Sound	
Best magazine programme	Loose Ends	BBC Radio 4	
Best original script	The Awful Insulation of Rage	BBC Radio 3	
Best outside broadcast	The Mammouth Mail Couch Drive	BBC Radio 1	
Best pop music programme	The Network Chart Show	Capital Radio	
Best popular music programme	World Popular Song Festival	BBC Radio 1	
Best specialist music programme	Andy Kershaw	BBC Radio 1	
Best use of comedy	Huddwinks	BBC Radio 2	

== 1988 Gold Award winners ==
Category	Winner	Station/Organisation	Refs
Outstanding contribution to radio over the years	Gerard Mansell		
Outstanding service to the community by a local radio station	Campus Radio on Radio Tay	Radio Tay	
Best actress	Harriet Walter for Rhyme and Reason	BBC Radio 4	
Best actor	Edward Petherbridge for The Wide Brimmed Hat	BBC Radio 4	
Radio personality of the year	Alan Freeman	Capital Radio	
Local radio personality of the year	Barbara Sturgeon	BBC Radio Kent	
Special award for services to radio	Thena Heshel In Touch	Radio 4	
National DJ of the year	Mike Smith	BBC Radio 1	
Local DJ of the year	James Whale	Radio Aire	
Radio reporter of the year	Lindsay Taylor	LBC	
Sports broadcaster of the year	Terence O'Donohue	BBC Radio Wales	
Technical excellence and achievement	Viva Verdi! Act 1	BBC Radio 4	
Most creative use of radio	Mauthausen Concentration Camp	Moray Firth Radio	
Best children's programme	It's Russell Harris	BBC Radio Humberside	
Best classical music programme	Tomticketatom: Bolero	BBC Radio 4	
Best community service programme	Roghe Sate (Good Health)	BBC Pashto Service	
Best current affairs programme	Morning Merseyside	BBC Radio Merseyside	
Best documentary/feature programme	Waiting for Mrs Forbes (Note: Radio feature written and presented by Ray Gosling, describing the work of Rev Kenneth Forrester who tends an ageing and declining Anglican community in Pau in south-west France. Described by Piers Plowright as "an absolute masterpiece".)	BBC Radio 4	
Best drama production	News of the World	BBC World Service	
Best dramatisation	Cheap in August	BBC Radio 4	
Best local radio programme	Oliver's Story	BBC Radio Leicester	
Best magazine programme	Medicine Now	BBC Radio 4	
Best original script	Village Fête	BBC Radio 4	
Best outside broadcast	Mainline - The Operation	BBC Radio Cleveland	
Best pop music programme	Elvis 10 years After	Radio Trent	
Best popular music programme	The Eric Clapton Story	BBC Radio 1	
Best specialist music programme	Before the Blues	BBC Radio 3	
Best use of comedy	Crisp and Even Brightly	BBC Radio 4	

== 1989 Gold Award winners ==
Category	Winner	Station/Organisation	Refs
Outstanding contribution to radio over the years	Tony Blackburn		
Outstanding service to the community	You and Your Benefit Presented by John Howard	BBC Radio 4	
Best actress	Kate Murphy for Elephant Dances	Radio Clyde	
Best actor	Andrews Sachs for The Heart of a Dog	BBC World Service	
Radio personality of the year	Sue Lawley		
Local radio personality of the year	Susie Mathis	BBC GMR	
Special award for services to radio	John Whitney		
National DJ of the year	Bruno Brookes	BBC Radio 1	
Local DJ of the year	David Jensen	Capital Radio	
Radio reporter of the year	John Alcock	LBC	
Local station of the year	BRMB (now called Free Radio Birmingham)	BRMB	
Most creative use of radio	The Dream	BBC Radio 1	
Society of Authors award for best dramatisation/adaptation	The Dippers	BBC Radio 4	
Society of Authors award for best original script	Excess Baggage	BBC Radio 4	
Best breakfast show	The Les Ross Breakfast Show	BRMB	
Best children's programme/programming/series	Down Our Way	BBC Radio Bristol	
Best classical music programme	Meridian: Bartok Quartets	BBC World Service	
Best current affairs programme	Today	BBC Radio 4	
Best daily news programme	210 Reports	Radio 210	
Best documentary feature: general	Cheltenham, The Irish Favourite	BBC Radio 4	
Best documentary feature: music/arts	Insect Musicians	BBC Radio 3	
Best documentary feature: news and current affairs	I Want to be Normal Again	BBC Radio 4	
Best drama production	Cigarettes and Chocolate	BBC Radio 4	
Best education programme/programming/series	Community Matters: The Case Conference	BBC Radio 4	
Best magazine programme	Third Ear	BBC Radio 3	
Best outside broadcast	Give A Child A Chance – Live from Disney World	Radio Aire	
Best response to a news event	The Lockerbie Air Disaster	Radio Forth	
Best response to a news event	Today of 22.12.88	BBC Radio 4	
Best rock/pop programme	The Beeb's Lost Beatles Tapes	BBC Radio 1	
Best sequence programming	Morning Call	Moray Firth Radio	
Best specialist music programme	Kershaw in Zimbabwe	BBC Radio 1	
Best sports programme	Mid Week Sportsound	BBC Radio Ulster	
Best technical achievement	BBC Radio Show	BBC Network and Local Radio	
Best use of comedy	Whose Line Is it Anyway?	BBC Radio 4	

== 1990 Gold Award winners ==
Category	Winner	Station/Organisation	Refs
Outstanding contribution to radio over the years	Roy Hudd		
Outstanding service to the community	Face The Facts – the Series	BBC Radio 4	
Outstanding service to the community	Varying Degrees	BBC Radio Ulster	
Best actress	Marsha Mason for Visitor from Hollywood Plaza Suite	BBC Radio 4	
Best actor	Timothy West for The Price	BBC Radio 4	
Radio personality of the year	Chris Tarrant	Capital Radio	
Local radio personality of the year	Gerry Anderson	BBC Radio Ulster	
Smash Hits (Note: The awards for best national and local DJs were voted for by the readers of Smash Hits magazine.) best national DJ	Bruno Brookes	BBC Radio 1	
Smash Hits best local DJ	Ally Bally	Radio Tay	
Radio reporter of the year	James Miles	BBC Radio 1, Radio 2 and Radio 4	
Local station of the year	BBC Radio Foyle	BBC Radio Foyle	
Special award for services to radio	BBC Radio Drama Company	BBC	
Radio Academy creative award	My Dog Has Fleas	BBC Radio 4	
Best technical achievement	Swansong	BBC Radio 3	
Society of Authors award: best original script	The Rime of the Bounty	BBC Radio 4	
Society of Authors award: best dramatisation/adaptation	A Tale of Two Cities	BBC Radio 4	
Best breakfast show	Breakfast Live	BBC Hereford & Worcester	
Best children's programme	In The News	BBC Radio 4	
Best classical music programme	Tasting Notes	BBC Radio 3	
Best current affairs programme	The World Tonight	BBC Radio 4	
Best daily news programme	Today	BBC Radio 4	
Best documentary feature: general	Never The Same Again	BBC Radio 4	
Best documentary feature: music and arts	Dear Miss Pym, Dear Mr Larkin	BBC Radio 4	
Best documentary feature: news and current affairs	The Indissoluable Union – Cotton, Chemicals & Corruption – The Russians Special	BBC Radio 4	
Best drama production	The Bass Saxophone	BBC Radio 3	
Best education programme	The Health Show	BBC Radio 4	
Best magazine programme	Country Matters	BBC Radio Gloucestershire	
Best outside broadcast	The Radio 1 Around the World Challenge (Note: DJ Simon Bates travelled the world with producer Jonathan Ruffe, and transmitted 57 live broadcasts over 77 days, using a portable satellite dish and generator.)	BBC Radio 1	
Best response to a news event	Hillsborough	Radio City	
Best response to a news event	Today – The Romanian Revolution	BBC Radio 4	
Best rock and pop programme	Not Fade Away – A Tribute to Buddy Holly	BBC Radio 1	
Best sequence programming	Morning Call	Moray Firth Radio (Note: Moray Firth Radio was the UK's smallest commercial radio station at the time.)	
Best specialist music programme	Electric Youth	BRMB/Essex Radio	
Best sports programme	Capital Gold Sports Show	Capital Gold	
Best use of comedy	Dick Tarrant	Capital Radio	

== 1991 Gold Award winners ==
Category	Winner	Station/Organisation	Refs
Outstanding contribution to radio over the years (Note: The award was presented by Prince Edward and Mark Knopfler, who thanked Gillett for helping Dire Straits by playing the music early in their career.)	Charlie Gillett	BBC and Capital Radio	
Outstanding service to the community	On The Street	BBC Radio Stoke	
Best actress	Mary Wimbush for The Mystery of Edwin Drood and The Horse's Mouth	BBC World Service	
Best actor	Ian Holm for The Mystery of Edwin Drood	BBC World Service	
Radio personality of the year	James Naughtie	BBC	
Local radio personality of the year	George Jones	BBC Radio Ulster	
Smash Hits national DJ	Simon Mayo	BBC Radio 1	
Smash Hits local DJ of the year	Neil Fox	Capital Radio	
Radio reporter of the year	no award made		
Local station of the year	Radio Borders	Radio Borders	
Radio Academy award	BBC Light Entertainment Department	BBC	
Society of Authors award: best dramatisation/adaptation	All The World's A Globe	BBC Radio 3	
Society of Authors award: best original script	Different States	BBC Radio 4	
Best breakfast show	Network Africa	BBC World Service for Africa	
Best children's programme	A Hallowe'en Tale with Music	BBC Radio Scotland	
Best classical music program	no award made		
Best current affairs programme	Sunday Newsbreak	BBC Radio Ulster	
Best daily news programme	The Fox Report – Margaret Thatcher Resigns	Fox FM	
Best documentary feature: general	The Teachers	BBC Radio 4	
Best documentary feature: music/arts	Gerontius	BBC Radio 4	
Best documentary feature: news and current affairs	Stormclouds Over The Himalayas	BBC World Service	
Best documentary feature: rock and pop	Last Night a DJ Saved My Life	BBC Radio 1	
Best drama production	Different States	BBC Radio 4	
Best education programme	Women and Aids	BBC Radio Sussex	
Best magazine programme	Woman's Hour	BBC Radio 4	
Best response to a news event	Nelson Mandela Release	BBC World Service for Africa	
Best rock and pop programme	Cousin Matty	City FM	
Best sequence programming	Jeff Owen	BBC Radio Nottingham	
Best specialist music programme	The Capital Rap Show	Capital Radio	
Best sports programme	Sport on Five	BBC Radio 5	
Best use of comedy	Mary Whitehouse's Best Experiences So Far	BBC Radio 1	

== 1992 Gold Award winners ==
Category	Winner	Station/Organisation	Refs
Radio Academy Award	Richard Attenborough		
Gold Award	Jimmy Savile		
Best actress	Harriet Walter for Medea	BBC Radio 3	
Best actress	Felicity Kendal for In the Native State	BBC Radio 4	
Best actor	Tom Courtenay for Flowers for Algernon	BBC Radio 4	
Personality of the year	Danny Baker	BBC	
Local personality of the year	Peter Adamson	BBC Radio Humberside	
Smash Hits national DJ of the year	Simon Mayo	BBC Radio 1	
Smash Hits local DJ of the year	Pat Sharp	Capital FM	
Reporter of the year	Allan Little	BBC Radio 4	
Commentator of the year	Archie MacPherson	Clyde 1 and Clyde 2	
New broadcaster of the year	Richard Coles	BBC Radio 5	
Station of the year	Wear FM	Wear FM	
Society of Authors drama award	Lavender Song	BBC Radio 4	
Society of Authors writer's award	Tom Stoppard for In the Native State	BBC Radio 3	
Special Award	God Save the Queen (comedy)	Invicta FM	
Special Sony Award	BBC World Service	BBC World Service	
Social action award	In Touch	BBC Radio 4	
Best breakfast show: music based	Mark Page Breakfast Show	Aire FM	
Best breakfast show: speech based	Today: The Gulf War Day One	BBC Radio 4	
Best comedy/light entertainment programme	Perforated Ulster	BBC Radio Ulster	
Best feature documentary	Acting Up	BBC Radio 3	
Best magazine programme	Landmark	BBC Radio Wales	
Best music based show	In Preparation	BBC Radio 3	
Best news and current affairs	John Tanner and Rachel Maclean	BBC Radio Oxford	
Best phone-in	The Jeremy Dry Mid-Morning Show	BBC Hereford & Worcester	
Best short form feature	Friday Lives: Dr. Frank Ryding	BBC Radio 4	
Best specialist music show	Out on Blue Six	BBC Radio 1	
Best outside broadcast event	Twin Cities Weekend	BBC Radio 3	
Other daily sequence: music based	John Kelly Show	BBC Radio Ulster	
Other daily sequence: speech based	Outlook – Hostage Special	BBC World Service	
Specialist speech programme	On The Edge	BBC Radio Ulster	
Sports award	The Golden Game	Capital Gold 1548 AM	

== 1993 Gold Award winners ==
Category	Winner	Station/Organisation	Refs
Sony Gold Award	Humphrey Lyttelton		
Sony Special Award	Misha Glenny (Note: The award was for Glenny's coverage of the collapse of communism and the following wars in the former country of Yugoslavia.)	BBC	
Best actress	Miriam Margolyes for The Queen and I (Note: Sue Townsend's novel The Queen and I was abridged by Elizabeth Proud and read by Margolyes on Book at Bedtime.)	BBC Radio 4	
Best actor	Keith Clifford for Randle's Scandals (Note: A play by Trevor Hoyle about Lancashire comedian Frank Randle.)	BBC Radio 4	
National broadcaster of the year	John Peel		
Local broadcaster of the year	David Dunseith	BBC Radio Ulster	
News reporter of the year	Malcolm Brabant	BBC Radio 4	
Sports reporter of the year	Jonathan Agnew	BBC Radio 3 and BBC Radio 5	
Newcomer award	Tom Bright	Radio Wave	
National station of the year	Classic FM	Classic FM	
Metropolitan station of the year	Clyde 2	Clyde 2	
Local station of the year	Fox FM	Fox FM	
Outstanding service to the community	Year of Action	BBC Radio Nottingham	
Outstanding special event	Coca Cola National Music Day (Note: MCM linked 41 independent local radio stations with several venues for the event.)	MCM networking for Independent Radio	
Outstanding sports broadcast	Barcelona Olympics	BBC Radio 5	
Radio Academy creative award	David Hatch		
Society of Authors award: best dramatisation/adaptation	Weir of Hermiston	BBC Radio Scotland and Radio 4	
Best arts programme or feature	Larks Ascending	BBC Radio 4	
Best breakfast show: contemporary music	Tony Blackburn Breakfast Show	Capital Gold	
Best breakfast show: non-contemporary music	Nick Bailey	Classic FM	
Best breakfast show: speech based	Mike Carlton's Morning Report	LBC Newstalk	
Best documentary feature	Soundtrack: Jason and the Thunderbirds	BBC Radio 4	
Best drama production	The Master and Margarita	BBC World Service and BBC Radio 4	
Best magazine/special interest programme	Punters	BBC Radio 4	
Best music programming	Friel's Fancy (folk, blues and jazz)	BBC Radio Ulster	
Best news and current affairs programme	File on Four: Feltham Remand Centre	BBC Radio 4	
Best news and current affairs sequence	Good Morning Ulster	BBC Radio Ulster	
Best original script	A Matter of Sex, written by Nick Stafford	BBC Radio 4	
Best phone-in	Hayes Over Britain	BBC Radio 2	
Best popular music programme	Unsung Heroes (Note: Six part series celebrating songwriters who write for others.)	Unique Broadcasting/BBC Radio 1	
Best response to a news event	Ayodhya/Asian Newshour	BBC Radio Leicester	
Best specialist music programme	Scotland's Music	BBC Radio Scotland	
Best use of comedy/comedy show	Knowing Me, Knowing You	BBC Radio 4	

== 1994 Gold Award winners ==
Category	Winner	Station/Organisation	Refs
Outstanding contribution to radio over the years	Kenny Everett	Capital Gold	
Best actress	Wendy Seager for The Life Class	BBC Radio 4	
Best actor	Richard Griffiths for The Love Song of Alfred J Hitchcock	BBC Radio 3	
National broadcaster of the year	Henry Kelly	Classic FM	
Local broadcaster of the year	Stephen Le Fevre and Liz Green	BBC Radio Leeds	
News reporter of the Year	Fergal Keane	BBC Radio 4	
Sports reporter of the year	John Inverdale	BBC Radio 5	
Sports reporter of the year	John Rawling	BBC Radio 5	
Newcomer of the year	Simon Munnery	BBC Radio 1	
National station of the year	BBC Radio Scotland	BBC Radio Scotland	
Metropolitan station of the year	Clyde 2	Clyde 2	
Local station of the year	Spire FM	Spire FM	
Sony special award	BBC Radio Ulster and Downtown Radio (Note: The award was for the two stations' coverage of life in Northern Ireland over the past 18 years.)	BBC Radio Ulster and Downtown Radio	
Outstanding service to the radio industry	Johnny Beerling		
Outstanding service to the radio industry	John Tydeman	BBC	
Outstanding service to the community	Shout it Out	BBC Radio Devon	
Outstanding special event	U2 and 1FM	BBC Radio 1	
Outstanding sports broadcast	Sport on Five	BBC Radio 5	
Society of Authors award: best dramatisation	The Night of the Hunter	BBC Radio 4	
Society of Authors award: best original script	Homeward Bound	BBC World Service	
Radio Academy Award	The BBC RDS Development Team	BBC	
Arts programme or music feature	Hot in the City	Forth FM	
Music programming award	Ironic Maidens	BBC Radio 2	
Best breakfast show: contemporary music	Les Ross in the Morning	BRMB	
Best breakfast show: non-contemporary music	Wake Up To Wogan	BBC Radio 2	
Best breakfast show: speech based	Eddie Mair Live	BBC Radio Scotland	
Best documentary feature	Jack's Last Tape	BBC Radio 4	
Best drama production	Blue	BBC Radio 3	
Best magazine/special interest programme	The Big Holy One	BBC Radio 1	
Best news and current affairs programme	East, Going West – 1. Fundamentally Wrong	BBC Radio 4	
Best news and current affairs sequence	The Way It Is	Capital Radio	
Best phone-in	Kelly on the Radio (Note: The station broadcast a special edition of the show in the wake of the Shankill Road bombing and Greysteel massacre.)	Downtown Radio	
Best popular music programme	By Hart	BBC Radio 2	
Best response to a news event	Today – The Moscow White House Siege	BBC Radio 4	
Best specialist music programme	EuroMix	BBC Radio 5	
Best use of comedy/comedy show	A Look Back at the Nineties	BBC Radio 4	

== 1995 Gold Award winners ==
Category	Winner	Station/Organisation	Refs
Gold award	Alistair Cooke for Letter from America	BBC	
Sony special award	Peter Baldwin CBE	Radio Authority	
UK broadcaster of the year	Neil Fox	Capital FM	
Local/regional broadcaster of the year	Liz Green	BBC Radio Leeds	
Reporter of the year	John Waite for Face the Facts	BBC Radio 4	
UK station of the year	BBC Radio 2	BBC Radio 2	
Regional station of the year	Capital FM	Capital FM	
Local station of the year	BBC Radio Gloucestershire	BBC Radio Gloucestershire	
Radio Academy award	Jenny Abramsky for the launch of BBC Radio 5 Live	BBC Radio 5 Live	
Dramatic performance	Christine Lahti for Three Hotels	BBC World Service	
Dramatic performance	Bernard Hepton for Elgar's Third	BBC Radio 3	
Creative writing	Ronan Bennett for Fire and Rain	BBC Radio 4	
Society of Authors award for original drama	Elgar's Third by David Pownall	BBC Radio 3	
Arts or music feature	Leonard Cohen: Tower of Song	BBC Radio 1	
Breakfast show: music based	Sarah Kennedy's Early Show	BBC Radio 2	
Breakfast show: music based	Chris Tarrant Breakfast Show	Capital FM	
Breakfast show: speech based	Today	BBC Radio 4	
Documentary feature or series	CSA Making Daddy Pay	City FM/Radio City Gold	
Drama production	Mr McNamara	BBC World Service	
Magazine programme	Out This Week	BBC Radio 5 Live	
News and current affairs programme	Eye on Wales	BBC Radio Wales	
Popular music programme	It Was Thirty Years Ago Today	BBC Radio Humberside	
Popular music programming	Collins and Maconie's Hit Parade	BBC Radio 1	
Response to a news event	The Magazine: IRA Ceasefire	BBC Radio 5 Live	
Service to the community	Man Matters	BBC Radio 2	
Short form feature or documentary or series	The Fly	BBC Radio Wales	
Specialist music	Music of Madagascar	BBC Radio 3	
Sports award	Coverage of Tour de France	Southern FM	
Topical debates (including phone–in)	TalkBack: Bullying	BBC GMR	
Use of comedy/comedy show	I'm Sorry I Haven't A Clue	BBC Radio 4	

== 1996 Gold Award winners ==
Category	Winner	Station/Organisation	Refs
Gold Award	Richard Baker	Classic FM	
Broadcaster of the year: UK	Chris Evans	Ginger Air Productions	
Broadcaster of the year: local/regional	Steve Penk	Key 103	
Radio journalist of the year	Jon Silvermen	BBC Radio 4	
Sports broadcaster of the year	Jonathan Pearce	Capital Gold	
Music presenter of the year	Brian Kay	BBC Radio 3	
Best dramatic performance	Janet McTeer for A Dolls House	BBC Radio 4	
Interview of the year	In the Psychiatrists Chair: Ffyona Campbell	Michael Ember Assoc./BBC Radio 4	
Station of the year: UK	BBC Radio 5 Live	BBC Radio 5 Live	
Station of the year: regional/metropolitan	Clyde 1	Clyde 1	
Station of the year: local	Moray Firth Radio	Moray Firth Radio	
Radio Academy Award	The Henry Wood Promenade Concerts	BBC	
Society of Authors award: best radio writer	Lee Hall for I Luv U Jimmy Spud	BBC Radio 4	
Creativity/innovation in radio programming	Poetic Theorems	BBC Radio Scotland	
Arts programme speech or music	Green and Pleasant Land	BBC Radio 2	
Breakfast show: music based	Russ n Jono	Virgin Radio	
Breakfast show: speech based	Europe Today	BBC World Service	
Daytime music sequence programme	Sounds of the Sixties	BBC Radio 2	
Documentary programme/features	War and Peace	BBC Radio 2	
Drama production	Albion Tower	BBC Radio 3	
Educational programme	The Square on the Pythagoras	BBC Radio 4	
Event coverage	Ryder Cup coverage	BBC Radio 5 Live	
Magazine programme	Offspring	BBC Radio 4	
News and current affairs programme	Inverdale Nationwide	BBC Radio 5 Live	
News presentation/output	The Breakfast Programme	BBC Radio 5 Live	
On-air contest/competition	Apollo 13	Virgin Radio	
Phone-in/debate	Any Questions? Hong Kong, presented by Jonathan Dimbleby	BBC Radio 4	
Response to a news event	Dallyn on Saturday	BBC Radio 5 Live	
Service to the community	Affairs of the Heart	BBC Radio 2	
Specialist music programme	Kershaw in South Africa	BBC Radio 1	
Sports programme	Ryder Cup coverage	BBC Radio 5 Live	
Themed music programme	Fairest Isle	BBC Radio 3	
Use of comedy/comedy programme	People Like Us	BBC Radio 4	

== 1997 Gold Award winners ==
Category	Winner	Station/Organisation	Refs
Gold Award	Jimmy Young OBE	BBC	
Outstanding contribution to radio	Les Ross	BRMB	
Outstanding contribution to radio	Michael Green	BBC Radio	
Radio Academy Award	Quentin Howard		
Broadcaster of the year: UK	John Inverdale	BBC Radio 5 Live	
Broadcaster of the year: local/regional	Owen Money	BBC Radio Wales	
Radio reporter of the year: UK	Jane Standley	BBC World Service	
Radio reporter of the year: local/regional	Kate Fawcett	BBC Radio Scotland	
Sports broadcaster of the year	Alan Green	BBC Radio 5 Live	
Programme controller of the year	Steve Martin	The Pulse FM	
Interview of the year	Seven Days	BBC Radio Ulster	
Best dramatic performance	Kelly Hunter for Transit of Venus	BBC Radio 3	
Society of Authors award: best original drama	Five Kinds of Silence, written by Shelagh Stephenson	BBC Radio 4	
Station of the year: UK	Classic FM	Classic FM	
Station of the year: regional/metropolitan	BBC Radio Wales	BBC Radio Wales	
Station of the year: local	Moray Firth Radio	Moray Firth Radio	
Arts programme/programming	Private View	Pier Productions/BBC Radio 3	
Best personality based programme	Malcolm Boyden's Morning Show	BBC Radio WM	
Breakfast show: music based	The Heart 106.2 Morning Crew	Heart 106.2	
Breakfast show: speech based	Stuart Linnell Breakfast Show	BBC Radio WM	
Comedy	Goodness Gracious Me	BBC Radio 4	
Coverage of an event	Live from Tanglewood	BBC Radio 3	
Daytime music sequence programme	Owen Money	BBC Radio Wales	
Documentary feature	Alexandrias	BBC Radio 3	
Drama award	The Voluptuous Tango	BBC Radio 3	
Local involvement	Moray Firth Radio	Moray Firth Radio	
Magazine programme	Papertalk	BBC Radio 5 Live	
News and current affairs programme	Asia Gold: Lights the Way for Vietnam and Eclipses the West?	BBC Radio 4	
News presentation	World Service News	BBC World Service	
On air branding of station image	The Virgin Radio ID Package	Virgin Radio	
On air contest/competition	Who Do You Do?	Virgin Radio	
Phone-in/topical debate	Talkback	BBC Radio Ulster	
Response to a news event	Drumcree	BBC Radio Ulster	
Service to the community	Dunblane	BBC Radio Scotland	
Short information/entertainment feature	The Afternoon Shift (with Laurie Taylor)	BBC Radio 4	
Specialist music programme	Between the Ears: Beethoven's Fifth	BBC Radio 3	
Sports programme/programming	Kickin'	BBC Radio 1	
Themed music programme	The Friday Night Rock Show with Alan 'Fluff' Freeman	Virgin Radio	
Themed music programme	You've Got to Hide your Love Away	BBC GLR	

== 1998 Gold Award winners ==
Category	Winner	Station/Organisation	Refs
Gold award	Chris Evans	Virgin Radio	
Special award	Piers Plowright	BBC	
Special award	Roger Bennett	BBC	
Special award	Alex Dickson	Radio Clyde	
Special award	Cliff Morgan	BBC	
Broadcaster of the year (talk/news)	Anna Raeburn	Talk Radio UK	
DJ award	Jo Whiley, for Lunchtime Social	BBC Radio 1	
Station of the year (primarily to UK)	BBC Radio 5 Live	BBC Radio 5 Live	
Station of the year (1 – 12 million listeners)	BBC Radio WM	BBC Radio WM	
Station of the year (up to 1 million listeners)	Moray Firth Radio	Moray Firth Radio	
Arts award	Designs for Living: Fallingwater	Just Radio for BBC Radio 3	
Breakfast award (music)	Morning Glory, presented by Steve Jackson	Kiss 100 London	
Breakfast award (talk)	Breakfast Programme	BBC Radio 5 Live	
Comedy award	Blue Jam (programme 4)	BBC Radio 1	
Community award	Breast Cancer Awareness Compilation	BBC Radio Ulster	
Competition award	Mobile Phone Olympics	Heart 106.2	
Daytime award (music)	Mark Radcliffe Show	BBC Radio 1	
Daytime award (talk/news)	The Nicky Campbell Show	BBC Radio 5 Live	
Drama award	The Trick Is To Keep Breathing	BBC Radio Scotland	
Drivetime award (music)	John Dunn Show	BBC Radio 2	
Drivetime award (talk)	Drivetime with Tim Hubbard	BBC Radio Cornwall	
Evening/late night award (music)	Richard Allinson Show	BBC Radio 2	
Evening/late night award (talk)	Up All Night	BBC Radio 5 Live	
Event award	coverage of the Funeral of Diana, The Princess of Wales	BBC (Network, Regional and Local) Radio, and BBC World Service	
Feature award (music)	The Club that Scott Built	BBC Radio 2	
Feature award (talk/news)	The Coroner	BBC Radio 4	
Magazine award	Top of the Pops Radio Show	BBC Radio 1	
News award	coverage of the Death of the Princess of Wales	BBC Radio 4 and BBC Radio 5 Live	
Short form award	GRF Christmas Story	Clyde 1	
Special interest music award	Songs of the Sufi Mystics	BBC World Service	
Sports award	Wimbledon and The British Lions Test	BBC Radio 5 Live	
Station branding award	5 Live station branding	BBC Radio 5 Live	
Weekend award (music)	Parkinson's Sunday Supplement	BBC Radio 2	
Weekend award (talk/news)	Ed Doolan Show	BBC Radio WM	

== 1999 Gold Award winners ==
The 17th Sony Radio Academy Awards ceremony was held at the Grosvenor House Hotel in London on 28 April 1999 and was hosted by Kirsty Young and Paul Gambaccini.

Category	Winner	Station/Organisation	Refs
Gold Award (Note: The Gold Award was presented by Marianne Faithfull.)	Zoe Ball	BBC Radio 1	
Music broadcaster award	Mark Lamarr	BBC Radio 2	
Talk/news broadcaster award	Tim Hubbard	BBC Radio Cornwall	
Sports broadcaster award	Ian Payne	BBC Radio 5 Live	
Station of the year	BBC Radio 2	BBC Radio 2	
Regional station of the year	Clyde 2	Clyde 2 (Glasgow)	
Local station of the year	Moray Firth Radio (Note: This was the fourth year in a row that Moray Firth had won the local station award.)	Moray Firth Radio (Inverness)	
Arts award	Landscape of Fear	BBC Radio 4	
Breakfast music award	The Adam Cole Breakfast Show	Galaxy 102 (Manchester)	
Breakfast talk/news award	5 Live Breakfast	BBC Radio 5 Live	
Comedy award	Old Harry's Game	BBC Radio 4	
Community award	coverage of the Omagh bombing	BBC Radio Ulster	
Competition award	Live in the Car	Radio City 96.7 (Liverpool)	
Daytime music award	The Mark Radcliffe Show	BBC Radio 1	
Daytime talk/news award	Between Ourselves	BBC Radio 4	
Drama award	Bleak House	BBC Radio 4	
Drivetime music award	Simon James	96.3 Aire FM (Leeds)	
Drivetime talk/news award	Evening Extra: Agreement Day	BBC Radio Ulster	
Evening/late night music award	Pete Tong's Essential Selection	Wise Buddah for BBC Radio 1	
Evening/late night talk/news award	Up All Night	BBC Radio 5 Live	
Event award	coverage of the enthronement of the seventh Bishop of Liverpool (Note: The Rt Rev James Jones was enthroned on 7 November 1998.)	BBC Radio Merseyside	
Feature award – music	We Got The Funk (Note: A two part exploration of funk, presented by Ice-T.)	BBC Radio 1	
Feature award – speech	Between The Ears: Out of the Blue (Note: An experimental radiophonic feature exploring the impact of redundancy.)	BBC Radio 3	
Magazine award	Home Truths, hosted by John Peel (Note: As well as the three gold awards for Home Truths Peel also received a silver award in the talk/news broadcaster category.)	BBC Radio 4	
News award	Farming Today	BBC Radio 4	
Short form award	Home Truths Inserts	BBC Radio 4	
Special interest music award	Shake, Rattle and Roll	BBC Radio 2	
Sports award	Metro Sport: Two Wembley Finals (Note: In 1998 Middlesbrough played Chelsea in the Football League Cup Final and Newcastle United played Arsenal in the FA Cup Final.)	Metro FM (Newcastle)	
Station branding award	Classic FM	Classic FM	
Weekend music award	Alan Mann's Afters (Note: A day after winning the award Mann's slots on Classic FM (weekday nights and Sundays) were reduced to one Wednesday night slot of one hour.)	Classic FM	
Weekend talk/news award	Home Truths	BBC Radio 4	

== 2000 Gold Award winners ==
The 18th Sony Radio Academy Awards ceremony was held at the Grosvenor House Hotel in London on 2 May 2000. BBC Radio 4 was the most nominated station, with 24 entries, and received four awards. Guests included the actors Jenny Agutter and Christopher Lee, Chris Smith (Secretary of State for Culture), and Dale Winton, who all presented awards.

Category	Winner	Station/Organisation	Refs
Gold award	Ralph Bernard	Classic FM/GWR	
Lifetime achievement award	Alan "Fluff" Freeman (Note: Freeman, who was struggling with severe arthritis, received a standing ovation and was recognised by the Radio Academy for "his tireless dedication to UK radio".)		
Music broadcaster award	Pete Tong	Wise Buddah for BBC Radio 1	
News and talk broadcaster award	Roger Phillips	BBC Radio Merseyside	
Station of the year (UK)	Classic FM	Classic FM	
Station of the year (500,000 – 12 million)	Kiss 100	Kiss 100	
Station of the year (up to 500,000)	BBC Radio Foyle	BBC Radio Foyle	
Breakfast music award	Bam Bam Breakfast	Kiss 100	
Breakfast news and talk award	The Morning Programme	BBC Radio Foyle	
Comedy award	Blue Jam	Talkback Productions for BBC Radio 1	
Competition award	Jono's Australian Experience	Heart 106.2	
Drama award	Plum's War, (Note: Drama examining P. G. Wodehouse's wartime broadcasts and their effect on George Orwell.) written by Michael Butt	The Fiction Factory for BBC Radio 4	
Entertainment award	Jon & Andy	103.2 Power FM	
Event award	coverage of The Open golf tournament	BBC Sport for BBC Radio 5 Live	
Feature award	Out of the Darkness: The Triumph of Nelson Mandela (Note: A tribute to Nelson Mandela as he neared the end of his presidency, presented by Allan Little.)	Radio 4 Home Current Affairs for BBC Radio 4	
Interactive award	On The Ball	BBC Scotland	
Music presentation award: UK	Jonathan Ross Show	BBC Music Entertainment and Off The Kerb Productions for BBC Radio 2	
Music presentation award: regional (Note: For stations with a potential audience of 500,000 to 12 million listeners.)	Bam Bam Breakfast	Kiss 100	
'Music Special' award	For Your Ears Only, presented by Honor Blackman	BBC Music Entertainment for BBC Radio 2	
News award	Late Night Live: Soho Bomb, (Note: On 30 April 1999 a nail bomb exploded at the Admiral Duncan pub in Soho.) presented by Brian Hayes	BBC News and Current Affairs for BBC Radio 5 Live	
Public service award	Sunday Surgery, presented by Sara Cox and Dr. Mark Hamilton	BBC Music Entertainment for BBC Radio 1	
Public service award	Out of the Red, presented by Sara Cox	BBC Music Entertainment for BBC Radio 1	
Public service award	Chemical Beats, presented by Danny Dyer	BBC Music Entertainment for BBC Radio 1	
Short form award	Woman's Hour inserts	BBC Features & Events for BBC Radio 4	
Specialist music award	Worldwide with Gilles Peterson	Somethin' Else for BBC Radio 1	
Speech award	The Evacuation: The True Story, (Note: A five part series on the evacuation of civilians from British cities during World War II.) presented by Charles Wheeler	Martin Weitz Assoc. for BBC Radio 4	
Sports award	Super Sunday, presented by Gideon Coe and Pete Stevens	BBC GLR	
Station sound award	Classic FM	Classic FM	

== 2001 Gold Award winners ==
The 19th Sony Radio Academy Awards ceremony, hosted by Paul Gambaccini, was held at the Grosvenor House Hotel in London on 30 April 2001. The BBC won gold awards in 23 out of 30 categories. A new category, Digital Terrestrial Station, (won by OneWord Radio) was introduced. The winner of the lifetime achievement award, Chris Tarrant, criticised the commercial sector for suppressing spontaneity in radio.

Category	Winner	Station/Organisation	Refs
Gold award	Chris Tarrant		
2000 award	Terry Wogan	BBC Radio 2	
Special award	Derek Cooper OBE	BBC Radio 4	
Speech broadcaster award	Peter White	BBC Radio 4	
Music broadcaster award	Stuart Maconie	BBC Radio 2	
News broadcaster award	Jon Gaunt	BBC Three Counties Radio	
UK Station of the year	BBC Radio 2	BBC Radio 2	
Station of the year: 500,000 – 12 million	Clyde 1	Clyde 1 (Glasgow)	
Station of the year: up to 500,000	BBC Radio Foyle	BBC Radio Foyle (Londonderry)	
Digital terrestrial station of the year	OneWord Radio	OneWord Radio	
Breakfast music award	Daryl Denham in the Morning	100.7 Heart FM (Birmingham)	
Breakfast news and talk award	The Jon Gaunt Breakfast Show	BBC Three Counties Radio	
Comedy award	Dead Ringers	BBC Radio 4	
Community award	Floodwatch 2000	BBC Radio York	
Competition award	Hey Sexy	Kiss 100	
Drama award	Alpha, written by Mike Walker	BBC World Service	
Entertainment award	Bitz and Pieces CD	Murf Media for local UK stations	
Event award	coverage of The Olympics	BBC Radio 5 Live	
Feature award	Thirteen Ways of Looking at a Blackbird	BBC Radio 3	
Interactive award	The Stephen Rhodes Consumer Programme	BBC Three Counties Radio	
Music programming award – daily sequences	The Mark Radcliffe Show	BBC Radio 1	
Music programming award – single programmes	Smash Hits, presented by Darren Proctor	Emap Big City Network	
'Music Special' award	Hymnus Paradisi, written by Eric Pringle	BBC Radio 4	
News coverage award	The Jon Gaunt Breakfast Show	BBC Three Counties Radio	
News programme award	On Your Farm, presented by Anna Hill	BBC Radio 4	
Short form award	Colloquies – Thomas Lynch	BBC Radio 4	
Specialist music award	A Beginner's Guide To Reggae, presented by Mark Lamarr	BBC Radio 2	
Speech award	Girl Talk, presented by Heidi Williams	BBC Radio Wales	
Sports award	Wembley Live Obituary Show, presented by Jim White	BBC Radio 5 Live	
Station sound award	BBC Radio 2	BBC Radio 2	

== 2002 Gold Award winners ==
The 20th Sony Radio Academy Awards ceremony, hosted by Paul Gambaccini, was held at the Grosvenor House Hotel in London on 2 May 2002. BBC Radio 4 won the most awards (six). Guests included the singers Jarvis Cocker and Feargal Sharkey, actress Janet Suzman, and the girl group Sugababes who all presented awards.

Category	Winner	Station/Organisation	Refs
Gold award	John Peel		
2001 award	BBC World Service	BBC World Service	
Speech broadcaster award	Alan Green	BBC Radio 5 Live	
News broadcaster award	Peter Allen and Jane Garvey	BBC Radio 5 Live	
Music broadcaster award	Big George	BBC Three Counties Radio	
Station of the year: UK	BBC Radio 2	BBC Radio 2	
Station of the year: 1 million plus	Radio City 96.7	Radio City 96.7 (Liverpool)	
Station of the year: 300,000 – 1 million	BBC Radio Cumbria	BBC Radio Cumbria	
Station of the year: under 300,000	FM103 Horizon	FM103 Horizon (Milton Keynes)	
Station of the year: digital terrestrial	Oneword Radio	Oneword Radio	
Breakfast music award	Wake Up To Wogan	BBC Radio 2	
Breakfast news and talk award	Five Live Breakfast – New York	BBC Radio 5 Live	
Comedy award	I'm Sorry I Haven't A Clue	BBC Radio 4	
Community award	Pillars of Faith	BBC Radio 1	
Competition award	Quit From Your Quilt	96.3 Radio Aire (Leeds)	
Drama award	A Woman in Waiting	BBC Radio 4	
Entertainment award	Terry Garoghan's Last Bus To Whitehawk	Southern FM	
Event award	Remembrance Sunday 2001	BBC Radio 4	
Feature award	Roots of Homophobia	BBC Radio 4	
Interactive award	The Stephen Nolan Show	Belfast City Beat	
Music programming award: daily sequences	The Pete & Geoff Show, presented by Pete Mitchell and Geoff Lloyd	Virgin Radio	
Music programming award: single programmes	Andy Kershaw	BBC Radio 3	
'Music Special' award	Badly Drawn America	BBC Radio 1	
News coverage award	coverage of the Holy Cross Girls School dispute	BBC Radio Ulster	
News programme	Document – The Day They Made It Rain	BBC Radio 4	
Short form award	Fresh Air Kids	BBC Radio 4	
Specialist music award	Charlie Gillett	BBC London 94.9	
Speech award	A Caribbean Night, hosted by Andy Kershaw and Linton Kwesi Johnson	BBC Radio 3	
Sports award	Chiles on Saturday	BBC Radio 5 Live	
Station sound award	Kiss 100	Kiss 100 (London)	

== 2003 Gold Award winners ==
The 21st Sony Radio Academy Awards ceremony, hosted by Paul Gambaccini, was held at the Grosvenor House Hotel in London on 8 May 2003. BBC Radio 4 won six awards including UK Station of the Year. Guests included Grace Jones, Sam Fox, Tony Blackburn, and Meatloaf who all presented awards.

Category	Winner	Station/Organisation	Refs
Gold award	John Humphrys		
2002 award	Jonathan Ross		
Speech broadcaster award	Stephen Nolan	Belfast City Beat	
Music broadcaster award	Paul Gambaccini	Howlett Media/Unique The Production Co. for BBC Radio 2	
News broadcaster award	Mark Murphy	BBC Radio Suffolk	
Station of the year: UK	BBC Radio 4	BBC Radio 4	
Station of the year: 1 million plus	BBC Radio Ulster	BBC Radio Ulster	
Station of the year: 300,000 – 1 million	Pirate FM	Pirate FM (Cornwall)	
Station of the year: under 300,000	FM103 Horizon	FM103 Horizon (Milton Keynes)	
Station of the year: digital terrestrial	Saga Radio	Saga Radio (London)	
Breakfast music award	Christian O'Connell's Breakfast Show	XFM (London)	
Comedy award	Just a Minute	BBC Radio 4	
Community award	Altogether Now	BBC Radio Leeds	
Competition award	Caravan of Doom	102.7 Hereward FM	
Drama award	Runt	BBC World Service	
Entertainment award	The Jonathan Ross Show	Off the Kerb Productions/BBC Radio 2	
Event award	coverage of the 2002 Cheltenham Festival, anchored by John Inverdale	BBC Radio 5 Live	
Feature award	The Troubles With Drugs	All Out Productions for BBC Radio 1	
Interaction award	The Stephen Nolan Show	Belfast City Beat	
Music programming award: daily sequences	Late Junction	BBC Radio 3	
Music programming award: single programmes	Dominic Mohan: The Who Special	Virgin Radio	
'Music Special' award	Axles, Engines, Music and Motown	BBC Wales Music for BBC Radio 4	
News coverage award	Today Programme: Ethiopian Famine	BBC Radio 4	
News output award	Andy Whittaker's Breakfast Show	BBC Radio Derby	
News programme award	File on 4: Cot Deaths	BBC Radio 4	
Short form award	On Saying Goodbye	BBC Radio 4	
Specialist music award	Bobby Friction & Nihal Presents	BBC Radio 1	
Speech award	Stark Talk: Joe Simpson	Stark Productions for BBC Radio Scotland	
Sports award	Football Finance: The Bankrupt Game	BBC Radio 5 Live	
Station sound award	BBC 7	BBC 7	

== 2004 Gold Award winners ==
The 22nd Sony Radio Academy Awards ceremony, hosted by Paul Gambaccini, was held at the Grosvenor House Hotel in London on 12 May 2004. Commercial radio won a number of the top awards but BBC Radio 4 retained the UK Station of the Year award. Guests included Sir Elton John, Penny Lancaster, and Amy Winehouse who all presented awards.

Category	Winner	Station/Organisation	Refs
Gold award	Johnnie Walker		
2003 award	Ian Robertson		
Speech broadcaster of the year	Ian Robertson	BBC Radio Sport for BBC Radio 5 Live	
Music broadcaster of the year	David Rodigan	Kiss 100	
News journalist of the year	Hugh Sykes	BBC Radio News: The World at One and PM for BBC Radio 4	
DJ of the year	Christian O'Connell	Xfm	
Station programmer of the year	John Simons, group programme director	GMG Radio	
Station of the year: UK	BBC Radio 4	BBC Radio 4	
Station of the year: 1 million plus	Heart 106.2	Heart 106.2	
Station of the year: 300,000 – 1 million	BBC Radio Suffolk	BBC Radio Suffolk	
Station of the year: under 300,000	BBC Radio Foyle	BBC Radio Foyle	
Station of the year: digital terrestrial	PrimeTime Radio	PrimeTime Radio	
Breakfast show of the year	JK & Joel @ Breakfast	Key 103	
Daily music show of the year	Lunchtime with Ace and Invisible	1Xtra for the BBC	
Weekly music show of the year	Jonathan Ross	Off The Kerb Productions/BBC Radio 2	
News programme of the year	Crossing Continents: India	BBC Radio Current Affairs for BBC Radio 4	
Promotional campaign of the year	8 Mile	BBC Broadcast for BBC Radio 5 Live	
Comedy award	I'm Sorry I Haven't a Christmas Carol	BBC Radio Entertainment for BBC Radio 4	
Community award	No Buts, a quit smoking campaign, hosted by Chris Ashley	BBC Radio Shropshire	
Competition award	Live With Matt and H	GWR FM Wiltshire	
Drama award	The Loneliest Road, written and directed by Gregory Whitehead	BBC Radio Drama for BBC Radio 3	
Entertainment award	Jono and Harriet at Breakfast	Heart 106.2	
Event award	The State Visit of President Bush	BBC Radio Cleveland	
Feature award	The Archive Hour: Lance Corporal Baronowski's Vietnam	Loftus Productions for BBC Radio 4	
Information award	Life Matters	Forth One	
Interaction award	The Stephen Nolan Show	City Beat	
'Music Special' award	For One Night Only: Bob Marley Live at the Lyceum, presented by Paul Gambaccini	BBC Radio & Music/Factual for Radio 4	
News output award	Drive, presented by Peter Allen and Jane Garvey	BBC Radio News for BBC Radio 5 Live	
News story award	Jeremy Bowen: The Capture of Saddam Hussein	Ten Alps/BBC Radio 5 Live	
Short form feature award	Stuck in the Middle	BBC Radio & Music Factual for BBC Radio 4	
Specialist music award	Andy Kershaw, Festival in the Desert	BBC Radio 3	
Speech award	The Stephen Nolan Show	City Beat	
Sports award	The Real Alex Ferguson, presented by Clive Anderson	Unique the Production Co. for BBC Radio 5 Live	
Station sound award	BBC Radio 5 Live	BBC Radio 5 Live	

== 2005 Gold Award winners ==
The 23rd Sony Radio Academy Awards ceremony, hosted by Paul Gambaccini, was held at the Grosvenor House Hotel in London on 9 May 2005. The BBC won 22 awards including 5 awards for BBC Radio 1. Guests included Alice Cooper, the tennis player Annabel Croft, TV presenter Kirsty Gallacher, BBC Radio 4's Sue MacGregor, Ulrika Jonsson, Heather McCartney and Shakin Stevens who all presented awards.

Category	Winner	Station/Organisation	Refs
Gold award	Steve Wright		
2004 award	UK Radio Aid		
Speech broadcaster of the year	Jeremy Vine	BBC Radio 2	
Music broadcaster of the year	Zane Lowe	BBC Radio 1	
News journalist of the year	Eddie Mair	BBC Radio 4	
DJ of the year	Danny Baker	BBC London 94.9	
Station programmer of the year	Richard Maddock	Radio City 96.7	
UK station of the year	BBC Radio 2	BBC Radio 2	
Station of the year: 1 million plus	Radio City 96.7	Radio City 96.7	
Station of the year: 300,000 – 1 million	BBC Three Counties Radio	BBC Three Counties Radio	
Station of the year: under 300,000	BBC Radio Foyle	BBC Radio Foyle	
Digital terrestrial station of the year	Capital Disney	Capital Disney	
Breakfast show of the year	Christian O'Connell's Breakfast Show	Xfm	
Daily music show of the year	Drivetime with Lucio	Kerrang! 105.2	
News programme of the year	Vote Friction, an investigation into the BNP	Unique the Production Co. for BBC Radio 1	
Weekly music show of the year	The Selector	FCUK FM	
Comedy award	Complete and Utter History of the Mona Lisa, performed by the National Theatre of Brent	Above the Title for BBC Radio 4	
Community award	The Stephen Nolan Show	BBC Radio Ulster	
Competition award	Christian O'Connell's Rock School	Xfm	
Drama award	Laughter in the Dark, an adaptation of Nabokov's novel dramatised by Craig Higginson	BBC Radio 3	
Entertainment award	Christian O'Connell's Breakfast Show	Xfm	
Event award	The Drive Show: D-Day Anniversary	BBC Radio Kent	
Feature award	Missing The Message, documentary about AIDS and young people	Unique the Production Co. for BBC Radio 1	
Information award	Unhappy Hour	Viking FM and Magic 1161	
Interactive radio award	Three Counties Breakfast	BBC Three Counties Radio	
'Music Special' award	Teenage Dreams So Hard To Beat, documentary about John Peel presented by Jarvis Cocker	BBC Radio 1	
News output award	coverage of the Beslan Siege	BBC World Service	
News story award	coverage of the Asian Tsunami, presented by Christian Fraser, Ross Hawkins, Shelagh Fogarty and Lesley Ashmall	BBC Radio 5 Live	
Promo award	A77 Guardian Angel Campaign	West Sound, West FM and SouthWest Sound FM	
Short form feature award	Blind Man's Beauty	BBC Radio 4	
Specialist music award	Zane Lowe	BBC Radio 1	
Speech award	Beyond Belief: Islam and Women	BBC Radio 4	
Sports award	City Till I Die, documentary on York City F.C. by journalist Colin Hazelden	BBC Radio York	
Station sound award	Kiss 100	Kiss 100	

== 2006 Gold Award winners ==
The 24th Sony Radio Academy Awards ceremony, hosted by Paul Gambaccini, was held at the Grosvenor House Hotel in London on 8 May 2006. Stephen Nolan became the first person to win seven gold Sony awards. Guests included Andrea Corr, Dame Edna Everage, Lenny Henry and Jeff Wayne who all presented awards.

Category	Winner	Station/Organisation	Refs
special Gold award	Sir Terry Wogan	BBC Radio 2	
Special award	The Beethoven Experience, the complete works of Beethoven with documentaries played over six days	BBC Radio 3	
Music radio personality of the year	Chris Evans	BBC Radio 2	
Music broadcaster of the year	Zane Lowe	BBC Radio 1	
News journalist of the year	Angus Stickler	BBC Radio 4	
Speech broadcaster of the year	Eddie Mair	BBC Radio 4	
Station programmer of the year	Richard Park	Magic 105.4	
Station of the year: UK	BBC Radio 1	BBC Radio 1	
Station of the year with: 1 million plus	Kerrang! 105.2	Kerrang! 105.2 (West Midlands)	
Station of the year: 300,000 – 1 million	Pirate FM	Pirate FM (Cornwall, Plymouth & West Devon)	
Station of the year: under 300,000	Coast 96.3	Coast 96.3 (North Wales Coast)	
Digital terrestrial station of the year	Planet Rock	Planet Rock	
Breakfast show award	Nick Ferrari at Breakfast	LBC 97.3 FM	
Breaking news award	coverage of The London Bombings (7/7)	GCap Media News for Capital Radio, XFM and Choice FM	
Comedy award	The Ape That Got Lucky	BBC Radio Entertainment for BBC Radio 4	
Community award	Hearing Voices, series exploring attitudes to mental health	BBC Hereford & Worcester	
Competition award	Xfm's Rock School	Xfm	
Drama award	No Background Music (Note: Portrayal of a Vietnam triage nurse, played by Sigourney Weaver, haunted by flashbacks. Written by Normi Noel and produced and directed by Gregory Whitehead.)	BBC Radio Drama for BBC Radio 4	
Entertainment award	Chris Moyles	BBC Radio 1	
Feature award	A Requiem for St Kilda (Note: Commemoration of the final evacuation of St Kilda in 1930, written and presented by the poet Kenneth Steven.)	BBC Radio & Music Factual for BBC Radio 4	
Interactive programme award	Scott Mills	BBC Radio 1	
Live event coverage award	coverage of The Boat Race (2005)	LBC Newsroom & Programming for LBC 97.3 FM and LBC News 1152 AM	
Music programme award	Mornings with Rick Shaw	Kerrang! 105.2	
Music special award	Lennon: The Wenner Tapes (Note: Portrait of John Lennon based on the tapes of Jann Wenner's interview with Lennon for Rolling Stone magazine in New York in 1970.)	Brook Lapping Productions for BBC Radio 4	
News and current affairs programme award	1800 News Bulletin, presented by Harriet Cass and Charlotte Green	BBC Radio News for BBC Radio 4	
News feature award	Return to Sarajevo (Note: The first part of series of three examining the effects of the Bosnian war. Ten years after the war ended with the Dayton Agreement, war correspondent Allan Little returned with producer Peter Burdin to interview again those who had shared their experiences during the Siege of Sarajevo.)	BBC World Service News & Current Affairs for BBC World Service	
Promo award	Kerrang! Christmas	Kerrang! 105.2	
Specialist music programme award	Zane Lowe	BBC Radio 1	
Speech programme award	The Stephen Nolan Show	BBC Radio Ulster	
Sports programme award	Fighting Talk, presented by Christian O'Connell	Worlds End Television for BBC Radio 5 Live	
Station Imaging award	Kerrang! 105.2	Kerrang! 105.2	

== 2007 Gold award winners ==
The 25th Sony Radio Academy Awards ceremony, hosted by Paul Gambaccini and Terry Wogan, was held at the Grosvenor House Hotel in London on 30 April 2007. The Sony Broadcasters' Broadcaster Award, a special prize to mark the 25th year of the awards, was given to John Peel, who died in 2004. The award was received by Sheila Ravenscroft, Peel's widow. Guests included a selection of actors, singers and broadcasters (Natasha Bedingfield, Katie Derham, Fred and Richard Fairbrass (Right Said Fred), Sir David Frost, Amanda Holden, Jamelia, Carol Vorderman, Konnie Huq (Blue Peter), Melinda Messenger, Dolores O'Riordan, and Richard Park) who all presented awards.

Category	Winner	Station/Organisation	Refs
Gold award	Paul Gambaccini		
Broadcasters' broadcaster award	John Peel		
Lifetime achievement award	Tony Butler	BBC West Midlands	
Music broadcaster of the year	Colin Murray	BBC Radio 1	
Music radio personality of the year	Chris Evans	BBC Radio 2	
News journalist of the year	John Humphrys (The Today Programme)	BBC Radio 4 (BBC Radio News)	
Speech broadcaster of the year	Eddie Nestor	BBC London 94.9	
Station programmer of the year	Francis Currie	Heart Network	
Station of the year: UK	Classic FM	Classic FM	
Station of the year: 1 million plus	Radio City 96.7	Radio City 96.7	
Station of the year: 300,000 – 1 million	BBC Radio Derby	BBC Radio Derby	
Station of the year: up to 300,000	Isle of Wight Radio	Isle of Wight Radio	
Station of the year: digital terrestrial	GaydarRadio	GaydarRadio	
Breakfast show	The Today Programme	BBC Radio 4 (BBC Radio News)	
Breaking news	coverage of the 2006 London tornado	BBC London 94.9	
Comedy	1966 And All That	BBC Radio 4 (BBC Radio Entertainment)	
Community	The Plot, community garden project based in Slough	BBC Radio Berkshire	
Competition	Who's Calling Christian?	Virgin Radio	
Drama	Lorilei (Note: Drama portraying the story of Lorilei Guillory who testified against the death penalty for her son's killer. Adapted from a stage play of the same name by Thomas Wright, which also used Guillory's words.)	BBC Radio 4 (BBC Radio Drama)	
Entertainment	The Chris Evans Show	BBC Radio 2	
Feature	Radio Ballads 2006: The Song of Steel (Note: Programme looking at the decline of the steel industry in Sheffield with social commentary, sound effects, and newly commissioned music. The series was inspired by the documentaries made by Ewan MacColl, Peggy Seeger and Charles Parker in 1956. Music by John Tams, Kate Rusby, Julie Matthews and Ray Hearne.)	BBC Radio 2 (Smooth Operations)	
Interactive programme	PM	BBC Radio 4 (BBC Radio News)	
Internet programme	Firin' Squad Unsigned Podcast	firinsquad.co.uk (Wise Buddah)	
Live event coverage	The Alan Shearer Testimonial	Magic 1152 (Magic 1152 Sport)	
Music programme	The Mark Radcliffe Show	BBC Radio 2 (Smooth Operations)	
Music special	Malcolm McLaren's Musical Map of London	BBC Radio 2 (Just Radio)	
News and current affairs programme	Five Live Breakfast, presented by Nicky Campbell and Shelagh Fogarty	BBC Radio 5 Live	
News feature	Letters from Guantanamo Bay, presented by Gavin Esler	BBC Radio 4 (Whistledown Productions)	
Promo	The Ashes	BBC Radio 5 Live Sports Extra (Five Live Promotions)	
Specialist music programme	Friction	BBC Asian Network	
Speech programme	The Reunion, series presented by Sue MacGregor which re-unites people involved in historical events	BBC Radio 4 (Whistledown Productions)	
Sports programme	Sportsweek, presented by Garry Richardson	BBC Radio 5 Live (Front Page Media)	
Station imaging	Planet Rock	Planet Rock	

== 2008 Gold Award winners ==
The 26th Sony Radio Academy Awards ceremony, hosted by Paul Gambaccini, was held at the Grosvenor House Hotel in London on 12 May 2008. The BBC World Service won four awards, including Journalist of the Year for Owen Bennett-Jones. Guests included Edwyn Collins, Joan Collins, Boris Johnson, Al Murray, and Will Young who all presented awards.

Category	Winner	Station/Organisation	Refs
special Gold award	Brian Matthew	BBC Radio 2	
Special award	Jenny Abramsky	BBC Audio and Music	
Local and regional lifetime achievement	Eamonn Mallie, for reporting The Troubles in Northern Ireland	Downtown Radio	
Music radio personality of the year	Jonathan Ross	BBC Radio 2 (BBC Radio 2 and Off the Kerb)	
Music broadcaster of the year	Andi Durrant	Galaxy Network (Distorted Productions and Galaxy Network Programming)	
News journalist of the year	Owen Bennett-Jones	BBC World Service (BBC World Service News Programmes)	
Speech broadcaster of the year	Simon Mayo	BBC Radio 5 Live (BBC News Programmes)	
Station programmer of the year	Mary Kalemkerian (Note: Mary Kalemkerian was a teacher before joining the BBC in 1979. She became head of programming at BBC7 in March 2002 before its launch in December. She later oversaw the station's rebranding as Radio 4 Extra in 2011 before announcing her retirement from the BBC in 2012.)	BBC7	
Rising star	George Lamb	BBC 6 Music	
Station of the year: UK	BBC Radio 4	BBC Radio 4	
Station of the year: 1 million plus	Key 103	Key 103 (Manchester)	
Station of the year: 300,000 – 1 million	GWR Bristol	GWR Bristol	
Station of the year: digital	Planet Rock	Planet Rock	
Station of the year: under 300,000	Silk FM	Silk FM	
Breakfast show	The Chris Moyles Show	BBC Radio 1	
Breaking news	coverage of the Omagh fire tragedy (Note: A house fire in Omagh where a family of seven died in what at first seemed to be an accident. Later, investigations pointed to arson, most likely by the father of the family, a convicted sex offender. A later inquiry also highlighted failings in the region's social services.)	BBC Radio Ulster (BBC Radio Current Affairs)	
Comedy	Down The Line (series 2, episode 2)	BBC Radio 4 (Down The Line Productions)	
Community	Lights Out London (Note: A campaign to raise awareness of environmental issues by encouraging Londoners to turn of unused lights for an hour on the longest day of the year.)	Capital 95.8	
Competition	Sell Me The Answer	Key 103	
Drama	Q&A (Note: 10 part dramatisation of Vikas Swarup's novel Q & A (also adapted for the film Slumdog Millionaire). The radio adaptation remained more faithful to the original book than the film. It was recorded on location in India and was adapted by Ayeesha Menon and produced by John Dryden.)	BBC Radio 4 (Goldhawk Essential)	
Entertainment	The Russell Brand Show	BBC Radio 2	
Feature	Malcolm McLaren's Life and Times in LA: A Radio Movie (Note: A vivid, music driven, sound picture of Los Angeles. Mclaren visited the city for a promotional tour and stayed for four years. Produced by Kate Bland.)	BBC Radio 2 (Just Radio)	
Internet programme	The Book Slam Podcast	The Book Slam Website (Karen P Productions/Patrick Neate)	
Listener participation	World Have Your Say	BBC World Service (BBC World Service News & Current Affairs)	
Live event coverage	Gosnold 400 (Note: Coverage of the celebration of 400th anniversary of the founding of Jamestown, Virginia. Suffolk explorer Bartholomew Gosnold was involved in setting up the colony.)	BBC Radio Suffolk	
Multiplatform radio	The Bangladesh Boat Project (Note: A month long journey through the Bangladesh wetlands looking at the effects of climate change.)	BBC World Service	
Music programme	The Dermot O'Leary Show	BBC Radio 2 (Murfia Productions)	
Music special	The Feelgood Factor (Note: Mark Radcliffe and Phil Walmsley on a radio road trip to visit locations associated with Dr. Feelgood's LP Down by the Jetty from 1975. Produced by John Leonard.)	BBC Radio 2 (Smooth Operations)	
News and current affairs programme	Newshour	BBC World Service (BBC World Service News & Current Affairs)	
News feature	Britain's Missing Girls (Note: Investigation of pregnant British asian women who travel to India for gender testing and abortions for female foetuses.)	BBC Asian Network (BBC News, BBC Investigations Unit and BBC Birmingham)	
Promo	96.3 Radio Aire's Green Project	Radio Aire (Aire Creative)	
Specialist music programme	Friday Night Floorfillers with Krystle, presented by Krystle Weaver	97.3 Forth One	
Speech programme	Saturday Live	BBC Radio 4 (BBC General Factual)	
Sports programme	All The Tickets Are in the Wrong Hands (Note: Investigation into how touts obtained hundreds of football tickets for the 2007 Champions league final between Liverpool FC and AC Milan. The programme also won the IRN News Award (Best Sports Coverage) in April 2008.)	Radio City (Radio City News & Sport)	
Station imaging	Magic 105.4	Magic 105.4 (Magic 105.4 Production)	

== 2009 Gold Award winners ==
Category	Winner	Station/Organisation	Refs
Gold award	Neil Fox		
Special award	Paul Brown (Note: Brown had worked in forces and commercial radio from 1970 to 1984. He then worked for the Independent Broadcasting Authority, and also various commercial radio organisations, including the RadioCentre as chairman, which he left at the end of 2008.)		
Local and regional lifetime achievement	Colin Slater	BBC Radio Nottingham	
Music broadcaster of the year	Mark Radcliffe	BBC Radio 2 (Smooth Operations)	
News journalist of the year	Gavin Lee	BBC Radio 5 Live (BBC News)	
Speech broadcaster of the year	Nick Ferrari	LBC 97.3	
Music radio personality of the year	Chris Evans	BBC Radio 2	
Speech radio personality of the year	Vanessa Feltz	BBC London 94.9	
Sony DAB rising star	Singing Henry (aka Henry Evans)	Kerrang! Radio	
Station of the year: UK	BBC Radio 3	BBC Radio 3	
Station of the year: 1 million plus	Kerrang 105.2	Kerrang 105.2	
Station of the year: 300,000 – 1 million	BBC Hereford & Worcester	BBC Hereford & Worcester	
Station of the year: under 300,000	Beacon Radio (Shropshire)	Beacon Radio (Shropshire)	
Station of the year: digital	Fun Kids	Fun Kids	
Breakfast show	5 Live Breakfast, presented by Nicky Campbell and Shelagh Fogarty	BBC Radio 5 Live	
Breaking news	coverage of The Rangers riots in Manchester	BBC Radio Manchester	
Comedy	Count Arthur Strong's Radio Show	BBC Radio 4 (Komedia Entertainment and Smooth Operations)	
Community	A Sound Fix (Spots)	Electric Radio Brixton (Prison Radio Association)	
Competition	Facebuck$	Galaxy (Manchester, Birmingham, Yorkshire & North East)	
Drama	Mr Larkin's Awkward Day	BBC Radio 4 (BBC Radio Drama)	
Entertainment	Chris Evans Drivetime	BBC Radio 2	
Feature	Between The Ears: Staring At The Wall, presented by Alan Dein	BBC Radio 3 (BBC Radio Documentaries)	
Internet programme	The Budgerigar and the Prisoner	Clifton Diocese	
Interview	Taking A Stand, Fergal Keane interviews Lana Vandenberghe (Note: Vandenberghe, while working at the Independent Police Complaints Commission, leaked documents to the press concerning the shooting of Jean Charles de Menezes.)	BBC Radio 4 (BBC Radio Current Affairs)	
Listener participation	Electric Radio Brixton: Daily Show	Electric Radio Brixton (Prison Radio Association and Electric Radio Brixton)	
Live event coverage	Absolute Coldplay (Note: Radio diary by Christian O'Connell as he travelled with Coldplay, ending with the complete concert from Munich from their Viva la Vida Tour.)	Absolute Radio (Absolute Radio and TBI Media)	
Multiplatform radio	coverage of Wimbledon	BBC Radio 5 Live (BBC Radio 5 Live interactive)	
Music programme	Words and Music, a themed sequence of music, poetry and prose	BBC Radio 3 (BBC Radio Arts/BBC Radio 3)	
Music programming	Classic FM	Classic FM	
Music special	Vaughan Williams: Valiant for Truth, portrait of the composer, presented by Stephen Johnson	BBC Radio 3	
News and current affairs	The World Today	BBC World Service (BBC World Service News and Current Affairs)	
News special	The Investigation: Never Too Old To Care	BBC Radio Scotland (Stark Production)	
Promo	Kiss The Planet – What Will You Do?	Kiss Network (Kiss Imaging Team)	
Specialist music programme	David Rodigan	Kiss Network (Kiss Specialist Production Team)	
Speech	Simon Mayo and Mark Kermode	BBC Radio 5 Live (BBC News)	
Sports	5 Live Olympic Breakfast	BBC Radio 5 Live (BBC News Programmes and BBC Sport)	
Station imaging	1Xtra	BBC 1 Xtra	
Themed programming	Family Life	BBC Hereford & Worcester	

== 2010 Gold Award winners ==
Category	Winner	Station/Organisation
Breakfast Show of the Year (10 million plus)	Today	BBC Radio 4
Breakfast Show of the Year (under 10 million)	Dixie & Gayle, The Real Breakfast Show	Real Radio Yorkshire
Best Music Programme	Dermot O'Leary	BBC Radio 2
Best Specialist Music Programme	Zane Lowe	BBC Radio 1
Best Entertainment Programme	Capital Breakfast	Capital London
Best Speech Programme	Nihal on BBC Asian Network	BBC Asian Network
Best Sports Programme	Sportsound	BBC Radio Scotland
Best News & Current Affairs Programme	Newshour	BBC World Service
Best Breaking News Coverage	Alzheimer's Tragedy	BBC Radio Ulster
Best Live Event Coverage	Absolute Blur	Absolute Radio
Best Community Programming	The New Ballads of Reading Gaol	BBC Radio Berkshire
Best Internet Programme	Hackney Podcast	Hackney Podcast
Music Radio Personality of the Year	Scott Mills	BBC Radio 1
Music Broadcaster of the Year	Zane Lowe	BBC Radio 1
Speech Radio Personality of the Year	Frances Finn	BBC Radio Nottingham
Speech Broadcaster of the Year	Sir David Attenborough	BBC Radio 4
News Journalist of the Year	Lyse Doucet	BBC World Service
Best Specialist Contributor	Mark Kermode	BBC Radio 5 live
Best Interview	Jenni Murray interviews Sharon Shoesmith	BBC Radio 4
Station Programmer of the Year	Euan McMorrow	Radio City 96.7
Best Use of Branded Content	NME Radio for Skins Radio	NME Radio
Best Single Promo/Commercial	Dear Stan	talkSPORT
Best Promotional/Advertising Campaign	Vote Joe	Real Radio North East
Best Competition	Who's Calling Christian'	Absolute Radio
Best Station Imaging	Oxfordshire's 106 JACK fm	Oxfordshire's 106 JACK fm
Best Music Special	Elvis By Bono	BBC Radio 4
Best News Special	Crossing Continents: Chechnya	BBC Radio 4
Best Feature	Archive on 4: Working for Margaret	BBC Radio 4
Best Comedy	Adam and Joe	BBC 6 Music
Best Drama	People Snogging in Public Places	BBC Radio 3
Station of the Year (up to 300,000)	Moray Firth Radio (MFR)	Moray Firth Radio (MFR)
Station of the Year (300,000 – 1 million)	BBC Radio Derby	BBC Radio Derby
Station of the Year (1 Million plus)	Kiss 100	Kiss 100
Digital Station of the Year	Planet Rock	Planet Rock
UK Station of the Year	BBC Radio 5 live	BBC Radio 5 live
The Special Gold Award	Trevor Nelson	
The Special Award	BFBS Radio	

== 2011 Gold Award winners ==
Category	Winner	Station/Organisation
Breakfast Show of the Year (10 million plus)	5 live Breakfast	BBC Radio 5 live
Breakfast Show of the Year (under 10 million)	The Graham Mack Breakfast show	BBC Wiltshire
Best Music Programme	Simon Mayo Drivetime	BBC Radio 2
Best Specialist Music Programme	Jazz on 3	BBC Radio 3
Best Entertainment Programme	The Frank Skinner Show	Absolute Radio
Best Speech Programme	The Infinite Monkey Cage	BBC Radio 4
Best Sports Programme	Fighting Talk	BBC Radio 5 live
Best News & Current Affairs Programme	Victoria Derbyshire	BBC Radio 5 live
Best Breaking News Coverage	5 live Drive: Birth Of The Coalition	BBC Radio 5 live
Best Live Event Coverage	The Ryder Cup on 5 live	BBC Radio 5 live
Best Community Programming	Warning: May Contain Nuts	BBC Radio Berkshire
Best Internet Programme	Answer Me This!	Answer Me This!
Music Radio Personality of the Year	Ronnie Wood	Absolute Radio, Absolute Classic Rock
Music Broadcaster of the Year	Zane Lowe	BBC Radio 1
Speech Radio Personality of the Year	Danny Baker	BBC Radio 5 live, BBC London 94.9
Speech Broadcaster of the Year	Jeremy Vine	BBC Radio 2
News Journalist of the Year	Matthew Price	BBC Radio 4
Best On-Air Contributor	Annabel Port	Absolute Radio
Best Interview	Jeremy Vine interviews Gordon Brown	BBC Radio 2
Best Use of Branded Content	Alex Masterley on Classic FM with Towry	Classic FM
Best Single Promo/Commercial	Capital's Summertime Ball Mash-up	95.8 Capital FM
Best Promotional/Advertising Campaign	The FIFA World Cup 2010, South Africa on talkSPORT	talkSPORT
Best Competition	Beat The Star	Heart West Midlands
Best Station Imaging	Kiss 100	Kiss 100
Best Music Special	The John Bonham Story	BBC 6 Music
Best News Special	Raoul Moat – The Final Hours	Real Radio
Best Feature	Heel, Toe, Step Together	BBC Radio 4
Best Comedy	The Jason Byrne Show	BBC Radio 2
Best Drama	Every Child Matters	BBC Radio 4
Best Use of Multiplatform	BBC Introducing	BBC Radio 1, BBC 6 Music, BBC Asian Network, BBC Radio 1Xtra, BBC Radio 3, BBC Local Radio, BBC Radio 2
Station of the Year (Under 300,000)	Central FM (103.1 FM)	Central FM (103.1 FM)
Station of the Year (300,000 – 1 million)	BBC Radio Derby	BBC Radio Derby
Station of the Year (1 Million plus)	105.4 Real Radio North West	105.4 Real Radio North West
Digital Station of the Year	Fun Kids	Fun Kids
UK Station of the Year	talkSPORT	talkSPORT
Station Programmer of the Year	Moz Dee	talkSPORT
The Special Gold Award	Annie Nightingale	BBC Radio 1
The Gold Award	Jenni Murray	

== 2012 Gold Award winners ==
Category	Winner	Station/Organisation
Breakfast Show of the Year (10 million plus)	KISS Breakfast with Rickie, Melvin and Charlie	Kiss 100
Breakfast Show of the Year (under 10 million)	Real Radio Breakfast with Gary and Lisa	Real Radio North East
Best Music Programme	Fearne Cotton	BBC Radio 1
Best Specialist Music Programme	David Rodigan	BBC Radio 2
Best Entertainment Programme	Beryl and Betty	BBC Radio Humberside
Best Speech Programme	Stephen Nolan	BBC Radio 5 Live
Best Sports Programme	Keys & Gray	talkSPORT
Best News & Current Affairs Programme	5 live Drive	BBC Radio 5 Live
Best Breaking News Coverage	PM	BBC Radio 4
Best Live Event Coverage	The Royal Wedding	BBC World Service
Best Community Programming	Face to Face	National Prison Radio
Best Internet Programme	Science Weekly: Sounds of the Space Shuttle – An Acoustic Tribute	The Guardian
Music Radio Personality of the Year	Chris Evans	BBC Radio 2
Music Broadcaster of the Year	Jools Holland	BBC Radio 2
Speech Radio Personality of the Year	Danny Baker	BBC Radio 5 Live
Speech Broadcaster of the Year	Victoria Derbyshire	BBC Radio 5 Live
News Journalist of the Year	Mike Thomson	BBC Radio 4
Best Interview	Eddie Mair interviews Julie Nicholson	BBC Radio 4
Station Programmer of the Year	Andy Roberts	KISS
Best Use of Branded Content	Danny Wallace's Naked Breakfast	Xfm
Best Single Promo/Commercial	Geoff Lloyd's Hometime Show – The Complaints	Absolute Radio
Best Promotional/Advertising Campaign	Wimbledon 2011	BBC Radio 2
Best Competition	2 Strangers and a Wedding	106 JACKfm Oxfordshire and glide FM 107.9 Oxfordshire
Best Station Imaging	BBC Radio 1Xtra	BBC Radio 1Xtra
Best Music Feature/Special/Documentary	Feeling Good – The Nina Simone Story Part 1	BBC Radio 2
Best News Feature/Special/Documentary	Child of Ardoyne	BBC Radio 3
Best Feature/Special/Documentary	Walking with the Wounded	Smooth Radio
Best Comedy	Mark Steel's in Town	BBC Radio 4
Best Drama	On It	BBC Radio 4
Best Use of Multiplatform/Social Media	Now Playing@6Music	BBC Radio 6 Music
Station of the Year (Under 300,000)	KL.FM 96.7	KL.FM 96.7
Station of the Year (300,000 – 1 million)	107.6 Juice FM	107.6 Juice FM
Station of the Year (1 Million plus)	Radio City 96.7	Radio City 96.7
UK Station of the Year	BBC Radio 6 Music	BBC Radio 6 Music
The Gold Award	Nicholas Parsons	

== 2013 Gold Award winners ==
Category	Winner	Station/Organisation
Breakfast Show of the Year (10 million plus)	Today Programme	BBC Radio 4
Breakfast Show of the Year (under 10 million)	Sam & Amy	Gem 106
Best Music Programme	The Dermot O'Leary Show	BBC Radio 2
Best Entertainment Programme	The Danny Baker Show	BBC Radio 5 Live
Best Speech Programme	Witness	BBC World Service
Best Sports Programme	5 live Olympics with Peter Allen and Colin Murray	BBC Radio 5 live
Best News & Current Affairs Programme	BBC Radio 1 Newsbeat	BBC Radio 1
Best Coverage of a Live Event	London 2012: The Olympic & Paralympic Games	BBC Radio 5 live
Best Community Programming	Ciaran's Cause	Real Radio North West
Music Radio Personality of the Year	Christian O'Connell	Absolute Radio
Music Radio Broadcaster of the Year	Cerys Matthews	BBC Radio 6 Music
Speech Radio Broadcaster of the Year	Eddie Mair	BBC Radio 4
Radio Journalism of the Year	John Humphrys	BBC Radio 4
Best Use of Branded Content	The Christian O'Connell Breakfast Show with Wickes	Absolute Radio
Best Promotional/Advertising Campaign	The Gothic Imagination	BBC Radio 4 & 4 Extra Presentation for BBC Radio 4
Best Competition	Coca-Cola Fan Reporter	talkSPORT
Best Station Imaging	BBC Radio 2	BBC Radio 2
Best Music Feature or Documentary	The Story of Ed Sheeran	BBC Radio 1
Best News Feature or Documentary	The Bombardment of Homs	BBC World Service
Best Feature or Documentary	Bruising Silence	BBC Radio 1
Best Comedy	Isy Suttie: Pearl and Dave	BBC Radio 4
Best Drama	The Resistance of Mrs Brown	BBC Radio 4
Best Use of Multiplatform	Radio 1's Review Show	BBC Radio 1
Station of the Year (Under 300,000)	KL.FM 96.7	KL.FM 96.7
Station of the Year (300,000 – 1 million)	BBC Radio Humberside	BBC Radio Humberside
Station of the Year (1 Million plus)	Metro Radio	Metro Radio
UK Station of the Year	BBC Radio 5 live	BBC Radio 5 live
UK Radio Brand of the Year	Classic FM	Classic FM
The Gold Award	Richard Park	
The Special Gold Award	Steve Lamacq	BBC Radio 6 Music

== 2014 Gold Award winners ==
Category	Winner	Station/Organisation
Breakfast Show of the Year (10 million plus)	The Capital Breakfast Show with Dave Berry & Lisa Snowdon	95.8 Capital FM
Breakfast Show of the Year (under 10 million)	Iain Lee	BBC Three Counties Radio
Best Music Programme	The Jazz Show with Jamie Cullum	BBC Radio 2
Best Specialist Music Programme	The Beatdown on XFM with Scroobius Pip	XFM London & XFM Manchester
Best Entertainment Programme	Greg James	BBC Radio 1
Best Speech Programme	The Frank Skinner Show	Absolute Radio
Best Sports Programme	The Day We Won Wimbledon	BBC Radio 5 live
Best News & Current Affairs Programme	PM	BBC Radio 4
Best Coverage of a Live Event	The Death of Nelson Mandela	BBC World Service
Best Community Programming	Slavery on our Streets	LBC 97.3
Music Radio Personality of the Year	Sam & Amy	Gem 106
Music Radio Broadcaster of the Year	Zane Lowe	BBC Radio 1
Speech Radio Personality of the Year	Danny Baker	BBC Radio 5 live
Speech Radio Broadcaster of the Year	Victoria Derbyshire	BBC Radio 5 live
National Radio Journalist of the Year	Tom Swarbrick	LBC 97.3
Local Radio Journalist of the Year	BBC Radio Norfolk News Team	BBC Radio Norfolk
Best Interview of the Year	Winfred Robinson interviews Ralph Bulger	BBC Radio 4
Best Use of Branded Content	The Christian O'Connell Breakfast Show with Wickes	Absolute Radio
Best Promotional Campaign	Wimbledon 2013	BBC World Service
Best Competition	The Heart House	Heart West Midlands
Best Station Imaging	KISS FM (UK)	KISS FM (UK)
Radio Brand of the Year	The Absolute Radio Network	The Absolute Radio Network
Best Music Feature or Documentary	Soul Music: Strange Fruit	BBC Radio 4
Best News Feature or Documentary	Tempted by Teacher	BBC Radio 1
Best Feature or Documentary	Between the Ears: Mighty Beast	BBC Radio 3
Best Comedy	The Secret World	BBC Radio 4
Best Drama	The Morpeth Carol	BBC Radio 4
Best Creative Innovation	#Lipdublincoln	BBC Radio Lincolnshire
Best Technical Innovation	InStream for Absolute Radio	Absolute Radio
Station of the Year (under 1 million)	BBC Tees	BBC Tees
Station of the Year (1 million plus)	BBC Radio Ulster	BBC Radio Ulster
UK Station of the Year	BBC Radio 2	BBC Radio 2
The Special Gold Award	Tony Blackburn	BBC Radio 2
The Special Award	The Production and Presentation Team for Call Clegg & Ask Boris	LBC

== Sources ==
- "Awards Win For Radio Wrinklies". AM/FM (11 ed.). May 1993.
- "Prize-winning radio programmes". Annual Report and Handbook 1984 (Report). London: BBC. 1983. p. 20. ISBN 0 563 20262 9.
- "Prize-winning radio programmes". Annual Report and Handbook 1985 (PDF) (Report). London: BBC. 1984. p. 17. ISBN 0 563 20371 4.
- "Prize-winning radio programmes". Annual Report and Handbook 1986 (PDF) (Report). London: BBC. 1985. p. 21. ISBN 0 563 20448 6.
- "Prize-winning radio programmes". Annual Report and Handbook 1987 (PDF) (Report). London: BBC. 1986. p. 21. ISBN 0 563 20542 3.
- "Awards". Annual Report and Accounts 1987 - 88 (PDF) (Report). London: BBC. 1988. p. 91. ISBN 0 563 20729 9.
- "Awards". Annual Report and Accounts 1990–91 (PDF) (Report). London: BBC. 1991. p. 78. ISBN 9 780563 362906.
- "Awards". Annual Report and Accounts 1991/92 (PDF) (Report). London: BBC. 1992. p. 76. ISBN 9 780563 364887.
- Annual Review 1992/93 (PDF) (Report). London: BBC. 1993. ISBN 9-780563-369820.
- "Major Awards in 1993/94". Report and accounts 1993/94 (PDF) (Report). London: BBC. 1994. pp. 95–6. ISBN 9-780563-370826.
- "Major radio awards in 1994/95". Report and Accounts 1994/95 (PDF) (Report). London: BBC. 1995. p. 99. ISBN 9-780563-387015.
- "Major Radio Awards in 1995/96". Report and Accounts 95/96 (PDF) (Report). London: BBC. 1996. p. 100. ISBN 9-780563-387718.
- "Major Radio Awards in 1996/97". Annual Report and Accounts 96/97 (PDF) (Report). London: BBC. 1997. p. 100. ISBN 9-780563-383956.
- "Radio Awards". Annual Report and Accounts 97/98 (PDF) (Report). London: BBC. 1998. p. 84. ISBN 9-780563-384748.
- "Zoe crowned queen of radio". BBC. London: BBC News. 28 April 1999.
- "Sony Radio Award winners". BBC. London: BBC News. 29 April 1999.
- "Ross in line for radio award". BBC. London: BBC News. 2 May 2000.
- "Not arf! Awards glory for Fluff". BBC. London: BBC News. 2 May 2000.
- "Sony Awards 2001: The winners". BBC. London: BBC News. 30 April 2001.
- "Radio Oscars turn on the glitz". BBC. London: BBC News. 1 May 2001.
- "Radio award for 'unrivalled' Peel". BBC. London: BBC News. 2 May 2002.
- "Sony Awards 2002: The winners". BBC. London: BBC News. 3 May 2002.
- "Sony Radio Awards 2003: Winners". BBC. London: BBC News. 8 May 2003.
- "Ross scoops radio awards". BBC. London: BBC News. 9 May 2003.
- "BBC team wins top award". BBC. London: BBC Sport. 9 May 2003.
- "Xfm's O'Connell wins Sony honour". BBC. London: BBC News. 13 May 2004.
- "Gold award for Radio Shropshire". BBC. London: BBC News. 13 May 2004.
- "Sony award winners: full list". BBC. London: BBC News. 10 May 2005.
- "Gold accolade for BBC Radio York". BBC. London: BBC News. 10 May 2005.
- "BBC Radio 2 named best UK station". BBC. London: BBC News. 10 May 2005.
- "Return to Sarajevo". BBC. London: BBC News. 19 October 2005.
- "Radio 1 named station of the year". BBC. London: BBC News. 9 May 2006.
- "Sony Radio Awards: The winners". BBC. London: BBC News. 9 May 2006.
- "Classic FM tops Sony Radio Awards". BBC. London: BBC News. 1 May 2007.
- "Sony Radio Awards: The winners". BBC. London: BBC News. 1 May 2007.
- "London lights out for environment". BBC. London: BBC News. 22 June 2007.
- "Biggest ever Beethoven Experience on the BBC". BBC (Press release). London: BBC Press Office. 4 May 2005.
- "'Tenage Dreams So Hard To Beat' Documentary". BBC. London: BBC Radio 1. 2004.
- "Archive Hour - John Lennon: The Wenner Tapes". BBC. London: BBC Radio 4: Arts and Drama. 2005.
- "A Requiem for St Kilda". BBC. London: BBC Radio 4 Extra. 2017 [2005].
- "The Plot wins Gold". BBC. London: BBC Berkshire. 3 May 2007.
- "Return to Sarajevo". BBC. London: BBC World Service. 17 October 2005.
- "Jonathan Pearce". Blackburn Management. London.
- "Former Students - Lisa Kerr". City of Edinburgh Music School. Edinburgh.
- "Radio gets gold for Gosnold show". Ipswich Star. 13 May 2008.
- "Winners Of Irn News Awards 2008 Announced". www.itn.co.uk (Press release). London: ITN. 15 April 2008.
- "Malcolm McLaren's Life and Times in LA: A Radio Movie". London: Just Radio. 2016.
- "Sue MacGregor". www.knightayton.co.uk. London: Knight Ayton Management.
- "Radio 2 steals the show at Sony Awards". Manchester Evening News. Manchester. 30 June 2005.
- "Les Ross M.B.E." MDS975. Birmingham.
- "Radio 2 And Neil Fox Awarded At The Sony Radio Awards". Mediatel. London. 27 April 1995.
- "Broadcast And Agency Awards". Mediatel. London. 28 April 1994.
- "Radio 5 Live Triumphs At Radio Awards". Mediatel. London. 1 May 1996.
- "BBC dominates Sony awards". Press Gazette. London. 10 May 2005.
- "Sony Radio Academy Awards 2009: Full list of winners". Press Gazette. London. 12 May 2009.
- "Sony Radio Awards 2000". www.radioawards.org. London: Radio Academy. Archived from the original on 24 January 2001 – via Internet Archive.
- "Sony Radio Academy Award winners". www.radio-now.co.uk. London. 6 May 2001. Archived from the original on 25 May 2013.
- "Sony Radio Academy Awards 2004 - The Drama Award". www.radioawards.org. London: Radio Academy. Archived from the original on 18 May 2006 – via Internet Archive.
- "Sony Radio Academy Awards 2004 - The 'Music Special' Award". www.radioawards.org. London: Radio Academy. Archived from the original on 18 May 2006 – via Internet Archive.
- "Sony Radio Academy Awards 2004 - The News Output Award". www.radioawards.org. London: Radio Academy. Archived from the original on 16 January 2006 – via Internet Archive.
- "Sony Radio Academy Awards 2005 Gold Winners". www.radioawards.org. London: Radio Academy. Archived from the original on 9 July 2006 – via Internet Archive.
- "Sony Radio Academy Awards 2006 - The News & Current Affairs Programme Award". www.radioawards.org. London: Radio Academy. Archived from the original on 18 May 2006 – via Internet Archive.
- "Sony Radio Academy Awards 2006 - The Sports Programme Award". www.radioawards.org. London: Radio Academy. Archived from the original on 18 May 2006 – via Internet Archive.
- "Sony Radio Academy Awards 2006 - The Feature Award". www.radioawards.org. London: Radio Academy. Archived from the original on 18 May 2006 – via Internet Archive.
- "Sony Radio Academy Awards 2006 - The News Feature Award". www.radioawards.org. London: Radio Academy. Archived from the original on 18 May 2006 – via Internet Archive.
- "Sony Radio Academy Awards 2006 - The Sports Programme Award". www.radioawards.org. London: Radio Academy. Archived from the original on 3 July 2007 – via Internet Archive.
- "The Monday Play". Radio Times. No. 3046. 25 March 1982. p. 39. Archived from the original on 12 January 2018 – via BBC Genome Project.
- "The Monday Play". Radio Times. No. 3085. 23 December 1982. p. 43. Archived from the original on 12 January 2018 – via BBC Genome Project.
- "Waiting for Mrs Forbes". Radio Times. No. 3308. 16 April 1987. p. 87. Archived from the original on 15 January 2018 – via BBC Genome Project.
- "A Matter of Sex". Radio Times. No. 3549. 2 January 1992. p. 97. Archived from the original on 20 January 2018 – via BBC Genome Project.
- "Book at Bedtime: The Queen and I". Radio Times. No. 3627. 8 July 1993. p. 95. Archived from the original on 20 October 2014 – via BBC Genome Project.
- "Randle's Scandals". Radio Times. No. 3647. 25 November 1993. p. 113. Archived from the original on 20 October 2014 – via BBC Genome Project.
- "We Got the Funk". Radio Times. No. 3857. 8 January 1998. p. 116. Archived from the original on 23 January 2018 – via BBC Genome Project.
- "Between the Ears". Radio Times. No. 3860. 29 January 1998. p. 112. Archived from the original on 23 January 2018 – via BBC Genome Project.
- "Out of Darkness: the Triumph of Nelson Mandela". Radio Times. No. 3924. 29 April 1999. p. 121. Archived from the original on 25 January 2018 – via BBC Genome Project.
- "Afternoon Play: Plum's War". Radio Times. No. 3933. 1 July 1999. p. 115. Archived from the original on 25 January 2018 – via BBC Genome Project.
- "Evacuation: the True Story". Radio Times. No. 3939. 12 August 1999. p. 112. Archived from the original on 25 January 2018 – via BBC Genome Project.
- "The Real Alex Ferguson". Radio Times. No. 4162. 18 December 2003. p. 211. Archived from the original on 29 January 2018 – via BBC Genome Project.
- "The Friday Play: No Background Music". Radio Times. No. 4248. 25 August 2005. p. 125. Archived from the original on 30 January 2018 – via BBC Genome Project.
- "Radio Ballads". Radio Times. No. 4273. 23 February 2006. p. 128. Archived from the original on 1 February 2018 – via BBC Genome Project.
- "The Friday Play: Lorilei". Radio Times. No. 4292. 6 July 2006. p. 141. Archived from the original on 1 February 2018 – via BBC Genome Project.
- "The Feelgood Factor". Radio Times. No. 4318. 11 January 2007. p. 118. Archived from the original on 3 February 2018 – via BBC Genome Project.
- "Sony Awards – Winners Announced". Radio Today. May 2006.
- "More for Hereford & Worcester". Radio Today. August 2006.
- "BBC is toast of Sony Awards". Radio Today. April 2007.
- "Commercial radio fights back". Radio Today. May 2008.
- "Paul Brown to leave RadioCentre". Radio Today. November 2008.
- "Double Sony Gold for Evans". Radio Today. May 2009.
- "Radio 4 Extra programming boss retires". Radio Today. May 2008.
- "A rewarding day for Scotland". The Herald. Glasgow. 30 April 1994.
- "The Radio Stars" (PDF). Studio Sound and Broadcast Engineering. Vol. 35, no. 5. Spotlight. May 1993. pp. 7–8. ISSN 0144-5944.
- "Archie Macpherson". Scottish Football Hall of Fame. 2007.
- "Misha Glenny". Speaker Ideas.
- "Sony Radio Academy Awards 2003". The Guardian. 9 May 2003.
- "Sony radio awards in full". The Guardian. 13 May 2004.
- "Sony Awards: full list of winners". The Guardian. 10 May 2005.
- "Sony Radio Academy Awards nominations list". The Guardian. 28 March 2007.
- "Sony Radio Academy Awards 2007". The Guardian. 1 May 2007.
- "Sony radio award winners [The Sony Radio Academy Awards 2008]". The Guardian. 13 May 2008.
- "Sony Radio Academy Awards 2009: Full list of winners". The Guardian. 12 May 2009.
- "DJ Krystle cracks it with gong for Forth 1". The Scotsman. 13 May 2008.
- "Chris Evans wins top radio awards". The Times. London. 1 May 2007.
- Bowie, Adam (12 March 2014). "A Brief History of Virgin Radio". The Ballad of Adam Bowie. section 1995-6.
- Buncombe, Andrew; Marks, Kathy; Finn, Gary; Watson-Smyth, Kate; Gregoriadis, Linus; Thornton, Philip; Hann, Michael (30 April 1999). "Two dead, 81 injured as nail bomb blasts gay pub in Soho". The Independent. London.
- Burrell, Ian (12 May 2004). "Radio 4 bounces back from WMD furore to win station of the year". The Independent. London.
- Damazer, Mark (24 February 2009). "Slumdog - you heard it here first". Radio 4 and 4 Extra Blog. London: BBC Radio 4.
- Deans, Jason (1 May 2001). "BBC revels in Sony awards triumph". The Guardian. London.
- Donovan, Paul (1991). The Radio Companion. London: HarperCollins. ISBN 9780246136480. OCLC 611303220.
- Elmes, Simon (2009). And Now on Radio 4: A Celebration of the World's Best Radio Station. London: Random House. ISBN 9781407005287. OCLC 124983788.
- Goodyer, Tim (June 1996). "This Year's Sony Radio Awards" (PDF). Studio Sound and Broadcast Engineering. Vol. 35, no. 5. Spotlight. p. 6. ISSN 0144-5944.
- Fielder, Hugh (11 May 1991). "BBC Dominates Sony Awards" (PDF). Music & Media. Vol. 8, no. 19. Amsterdam: BPI Communications BV. p. 4.
- Fielder, Hugh (12 May 1990). "BBC Dominates Sony Awards" (PDF). Music & Media. Vol. 7, no. 19. Amsterdam: BPI Communications BV. p. 9.
- Heasman, Jonathan (6 May 1995). "Radio 2, Capital Score In Sony Awards" (PDF). Music & Media. Vol. 12, no. 18. Amsterdam: BPI Communications BV. pp. 2, 28.
- Heasman, Jonathan (10 August 1996). "Capital Go For Comic Touch" (PDF). Music & Media. Vol. 13, no. 32. Amsterdam: BPI Communications BV. p. 4.
- Heasman, Jon (8 May 1999). "Versatile Peel's Sony triumph" (PDF). Music & Media. Vol. 16, no. 19. Amsterdam: BPI Communications BV. pp. 1, 17.
- Heasman, Jon (13 May 2000). "Golden night for Kiss at Sony's" (PDF). Music & Media. Vol. 17, no. 20. Amsterdam: BPI Communications BV. pp. 1, 21.
- Heasman, Jon (18 May 2002). "Music specialists score at Sonys" (PDF). Music & Media. Vol. 20, no. 21. London: VNU Business Media. p. 5.
- Heasman, Jon (24 May 2003). "BBC Radio 4 takes top Sonys" (PDF). Music & Media. Vol. 21, no. 22. London: VNU Business Media. p. 5.
- Hume, Lucy (2017). People of Today 2017. London: Debrett's. ISBN 9781999767037. OCLC 1007310029.
- Karpf, Anne (8 May 1999). "Don't kick a Mann when he's up". The Guardian. London.
- McGeever, Mike (16 May 1992). "BBC Radio Scoops Sony Awards" (PDF). Music & Media. Vol. 9, no. 20. Amsterdam: BPI Communications BV. p. 4.
- McGeever, Mike (8 May 1993). "Indie Radio Wins Top Sony Radio Awards, BBC Wins Majority" (PDF). Music & Media. Vol. 10, no. 19. Amsterdam: BPI Communications BV. p. 3.
- McGeever, Mike (24 May 1997). "BBC, Virgin on top at Sony Radio Awards" (PDF). Music & Media. Vol. 14, no. 21. Amsterdam: BPI Communications BV. p. 3.
- McGeever, Mike (23 May 1998). "BBC dominates Sony Awards (again)" (PDF). Music & Media. Vol. 15, no. 21. Amsterdam: BPI Communications BV. p. 3.
- McNally, Paul (13 May 2008). "BBC World Service scoops four Sony Awards". Press Gazette. London.
- Meadows, Julia (10 May 2005). "Sony Radio Award winners". The Writers' Guild blog.
- Media Monkey (9 May 2003). "Monkey goes to the Sony awards". The Guardian. London.
- Media Monkey (13 May 2004). "Monkey goes to the Sony awards". The Guardian. London.
- Media Monkey (10 May 2005). "Monkey goes to the Sony awards". The Guardian. London.
- Media Monkey (9 May 2006). "Monkey goes to the Sony awards". The Guardian. London.
- Media Monkey (1 May 2007). "Monkey goes to the Sony awards". The Guardian. London.
- Media Monkey (13 May 2008). "Monkey goes to the Sony radio awards". The Guardian. London.
- Milmo, Cahal (2 May 2000). "Lifetime achievement award given to Alan 'Fluff' Freeman - alright?". The Independent. London.
- Mitchell, Caroline; Lister, Brian; O'Shea, Tony (2009). Managing Radio. Lulu. ISBN 9781445223124.
- Moulton, Emily (13 November 2008). "Omagh fire tragedy one year on". Belfast Telegraph. Belfast.
- Morris, Sophie (11 May 2008). "My Life in Media: Mary Kalemkerian". The Independent. London.
- O'Carroll, Lisa (3 May 2002). "Peel scoops top prize at radio awards". The Guardian. London.
- Plunkett, John (1 May 2007). "The Sony radio awards: your verdict". The Guardian. London.
- Reynolds, Gillian (20 February 2007). "Radio Choices by Gillian Reynolds". The Telegraph. London.
- Sherwin, Adam (3 May 2003). "Sex and swearing help Radio 4 to reach new heights". The Times. London.
- Thomas, Gareth (12 May 2001). "Sony winner Tarrant criticises industry" (PDF). Music & Media. Vol. 18, no. 20. London: BPI Communications Inc. p. 3.
- Wells, Matt; Gregoriadis, Linus (3 May 2000). "Freeman gets radio 'Oscar' for 40 years of broadcasting". The Guardian. London.
- Whittam Smith, Andreas (9 November 1998). "The modernisers are moving in at Westminster Abbey". The Independent. London.
- Wilding, Geoff (9 March 1982). "Gresford – Bringing the lads up at last. An interview by Geoff Wilding". Wrexham History. Archived from the original on 12 January 2018.
