= 96.6 FM =

FM radio frequency

The following radio stations broadcast on FM frequency 96.6 MHz:

== China ==
- CNR Business Radio in Beijing

== United Kingdom ==
- Downtown Radio in Enniskillen and Omagh
- Greatest Hits Radio South Coast in Blandford Forum
- Greatest Hits Radio West Sussex in Chichester
- Heart East in Northampton and Daventry
- Heart Hertfordshire in Watford, St Albans and Hemel Hempstead
- Heart West in Tavistock
- Hits Radio Teesside in Teesside
- MFR in Speyside
- Nation Radio Wales in Lampeter
- Nevis Radio in Fort William
- Original 106 in Kirkcaldy
- Radio North Angus in Arbroath
