= 97.0 FM =

Radio frequency

The following radio stations broadcast on FM frequency 97.0 MHz:

== China ==
- CNR The Voice of China in Taiyuan

== Ireland ==
- RTÉ 2fm (Clermont Carn)

== Israel ==
- Radio Darom in the Negev

== Malaysia ==
- TraXX FM in Besut, Terengganu

== Turkey ==
- Radyo Fenerbahçe in Istanbul, Bursa, Kocaeli, and Sakarya
- Radyo 3 in Çanakkale and Tekirdağ

== United Kingdom ==
- Clyde 1 in Vale of Leven
- Fantasy Radio in Devizes
- Greatest Hits Radio Dumfries & Galloway in Dumfries
- Heart South in Dover, Reading
- Heart West in Exeter, Plymouth
- Hits Radio Coventry & Warwickshire in Coventry
- Nevis Radio in Glencoe
