= 24th Sony Radio Academy Awards =

The 24th Sony Radio Academy Awards were held on 8 May 2006 at the Grosvenor House Hotel, Park Lane in London. There were 29 categories of award and two special awards.

== Programme awards and winners ==
- The Breakfast Show Award — Nick Ferrari at Breakfast (LBC 97.3FM)
- The Music Programme Award — Mornings with Rick Shaw (Kerrang! 105.2 West Midlands)
- The Specialist Music Programme Award — Zane Lowe (BBC Radio 1)
- The News and Current Affairs Programme Award — 1800 News Bulletin (BBC Radio 4)
- The Sports Programme Award — Fighting Talk (BBC Radio 5 Live)
- The Speech Programme Award — The Stephen Nolan Show (BBC Radio Ulster)
- The Interactive Programme Award — Scott Mills (BBC Radio 1)
- The Entertainment Award — Chris Moyles (BBC Radio 1)

== Personality awards and winners ==
- The Music Broadcaster of the Year — Zane Lowe (BBC Radio 1)
- The Music Radio Personality of the Year — Chris Evans (BBC Radio 2)
- The News Journalist of the Year — Angus Stickler (BBC Radio 4)
- The Speech Broadcaster of the Year — Eddie Mair (BBC Radio 4)
- The Station Programmer of the Year — Richard Park (Magic 105.4)

== Production awards and winners ==
- The Drama Award — No Background Music (BBC Radio 4)
- The Comedy Award — The Ape That Got Lucky (BBC Radio 4)
- The Feature Award — A Requiem for St Kilda (BBC Radio 4)
- The Musical Special Award — Lennon: The Wenner Tapes (BBC Radio 4)
- The News Feature Award — Return to Sarajevo (BBC World Service)
- The Breaking News Award — The London Bombings (Capital Radio)
- The Live Event Coverage Award — The Boat Race 2005 (LBC)
- The Community Award — Hearing Voices (BBC Hereford & Worcester)
- The Promo Award — Kerrang! Christmas (Kerrang! 105.2 West Midlands)
- The Competition Award — Xfm's Rock School (Xfm)
- The Station Imaging Award — Kerrang! 105.2 West Midlands

== Station awards and winners ==
- Station of the Year with a potential audience of under 300,000 — Coast 96.3 (North Wales Coast)
- Station of the Year with a potential audience of 300,000 – 1 million — Pirate FM (Cornwall, Plymouth & West Devon)
- Station of the Year with a potential audience of 1 million plus — Kerrang! 105.2 West Midlands
- Digital Terrestrial Station of the Year — Planet Rock
- UK Station of the Year — BBC Radio 1

== Special awards ==
- The Special Award — The Beethoven Experience
- The Gold Award — Terry Wogan
