= Will Buckley (journalist) =

British sportswriter

Will Buckley is senior sports writer at The Observer, author of The Man Who Hated Football, and a frequent radio and television sport commentator in the United Kingdom.

== Career ==
Buckley was educated at Eton College and has written as a journalist about the school on a number of occasions since.

Buckley has appeared numerous times on BBC Radio 5 Live show Fighting Talk, where he has won eight games in eight seasons, at an average of 1 win per year. He also hosted American football-themed gameshow Quizbowl on Channel 4 in the 80s, and has appeared on Newsnight and The Last Word.

Buckley has also worked for the Express, and has had work published in GQ, Maxim, FHM, the Sunday Times and the Guardian.

In 1995, he wrote The Trial of Aaron Sherwood, a comedy in 3 parts for BBC Radio 4 about an inept lawyer's efforts to save his client from multiple fraud charges. Buckley's debut novel, The Man Who Hated Football was also well received. In its review, The Independent said, "Buckley's bitingly funny portrait of East Anglian society make up for the laddish commentary." The Times commented briefly that the novel was "prescient", "showing great understanding of the world of professional football", while it was characterized in The Telegraph as "hugely entertaining and acute".

In December 2010, Buckley (a qualified barrister) joined Norwich law firm Leathes Prior as a consultant.

== Controversy ==
In August 2009, Buckley accused Test Match Special presenter Jonathan Agnew of being "pervy" towards Lily Allen, who Agnew was interviewing for a segment on the BBC Radio 4 show, and was criticised by both Agnew and Allen – who described her interviewer as being "kind and gentlemanly" – as well as by many readers who left comments on his article. Buckley eventually apologised.

== Selected publications ==
- Buckley, Will (2004). The Man Who Hated Football. London: Fourth Estate. ISBN 0-00-717554-X.
- Will Buckley, ed. (2008). Fighting Talk: Flimsy Facts, Sweeping Statements and Inspired Sporting Hunches. London: Hodder & Stoughton. ISBN 978-0-340-97755-2.
