= Fighting Talk =

UK radio programme

- Other names: FT
- Genre: Sports panel game
- Running time: 50 minutes (approx)
- Country of origin: UK
- Language: English
- Home station: BBC Radio 5 Live
- Hosted by: Current; Rick Edwards; Former; Johnny Vaughan; Christian O'Connell; Colin Murray; Matt Johnson; Jonathan Pearce; Georgie Thompson; Josh Widdicombe
- Produced by: Simon Crosse; Charley Copsey; Mike Holt
- Recording studio: MediaCityUK (Salford Quays), Salford, Greater Manchester
- Original release: 4 October 2003 – Present
- No. of series: 15
- Opening theme: Sabotage by Beastie Boys
- Website: Official website
- Podcast: Fighting Talk Podcast

Fighting Talk is a topical sports show broadcast on BBC Radio 5 Live during the English football season. The show is broadcast on Saturday mornings between 11am and midday, and is currently presented by Rick Edwards.

Its first series was broadcast in October 2003, presented by Johnny Vaughan. Later series were presented by Christian O'Connell and Colin Murray.

The show has won two Gold Sony Radio Academy Awards in the sports programme category, in 2006 and 2011. In 2011, judges described the show as "like a modern version of old-fashioned Music Hall."

== History ==
The first series began in October 2003 and was hosted by Johnny Vaughan. The inaugural show featured a panel consisting of Greg Brady, Will Buckley, Bradley Walsh and the eventual winner, Stan Collymore. After the first series ended in April 2004, Vaughan left to present the Capital FM breakfast show.

In 2007, prizes were suspended during series 5 due to the BBC's blanket ban on hosting phone-in competitions; this came as a result of various phone-in and interactive voting scandals.

Christian O'Connell was the show's second presenter, and completed a successful second series from 2004 to 2005, culminating in a Gold Award for the show at the 24th Sony Radio Academy Awards. He left to focus on his new Virgin Radio breakfast show at the end of 2005. His last show was in December 2005, whivh featured his four favourite guests: John Rawling, Steve Bunce, Greg Brady and Bob Mills. This show also briefly featured the wives of three of those panellists, who were invited to answer (via telephone) a question on behalf of their husbands; Mills' wife was unavailable for comment.

Colin Murray started presenting the show in February 2006. He was the host for seven years until he left the BBC in July 2013, moving to rival network Talksport.

Murray was replaced by three presenters who rotated hosting duties. O'Connell returned, with commentator Jonathan Pearce and TV presenter Matt Johnson the others for the 2013–14 series.

For two series, 2014–15 and 2015–16, hosting duties were shared between presenter Georgie Thompson and comedian Josh Widdicombe. Murray returned to the show on 17 September 2016 and remained until his second departure at the end of the 2022–23 series.

Rick Edwards replaced Murray as the show's permanent host in September 2023.

=== The "Stuart Hall incident" ===
Fighting Talk made national news with an episode broadcast on 12 March 2005. The panel consisted of Danny Kelly, Will Buckley, John Rawling and Stuart Hall. Presenter Christian O'Connell asked the panel: "What other former all-conquering nations, clubs or individuals would you like to see have a renaissance?" Hall responded with "Zimbabwe" and criticised its president Robert Mugabe, saying "...don your flannels, black up, play leather on willow with Mugabe cast as a witch doctor. Imagine him out at Lord's casting a curse; tincture of bat's tongues, gorilla's gonads, tiger's testicles..." Shortly afterwards, O'Connell was heard to ask studio staff, "Are we still on air?"

During the same show, Hall was also asked for his opinion on sporting stars acting as role models for young people. In his response, he defended swearing by footballers suggesting that "your average 10-year-old can instruct you in oral or anal sex." The incidents were widely reported in the national press, although neither attracted significant criticism from listeners.

=== Any Other Business ===
A one-off, politics-based show — using the name of Fighting Talk's 'Any Other Business' round — was broadcast on Sunday 17 December 2006 at 19:00, presented by Richard Bacon. A run of four further shows billed as Fighting Talk: Any Other Business were broadcast between 15 July and 5 August 2007. The host was the original Fighting Talk presenter Johnny Vaughan and guests included Alan Duncan, Diane Abbott, Stephen Pound, Arabella Weir and Robin Ince.

=== Book ===
A tie-in book, entitled Fighting Talk: Flimsy Facts, Sweeping Statements and Inspired Sporting Hunches, edited by regular pundit Will Buckley, was published by Hodder & Stoughton on 2 October 2008.
