= Nick Ferrari =

Swiss-British radio host, television presenter and broadcast journalist

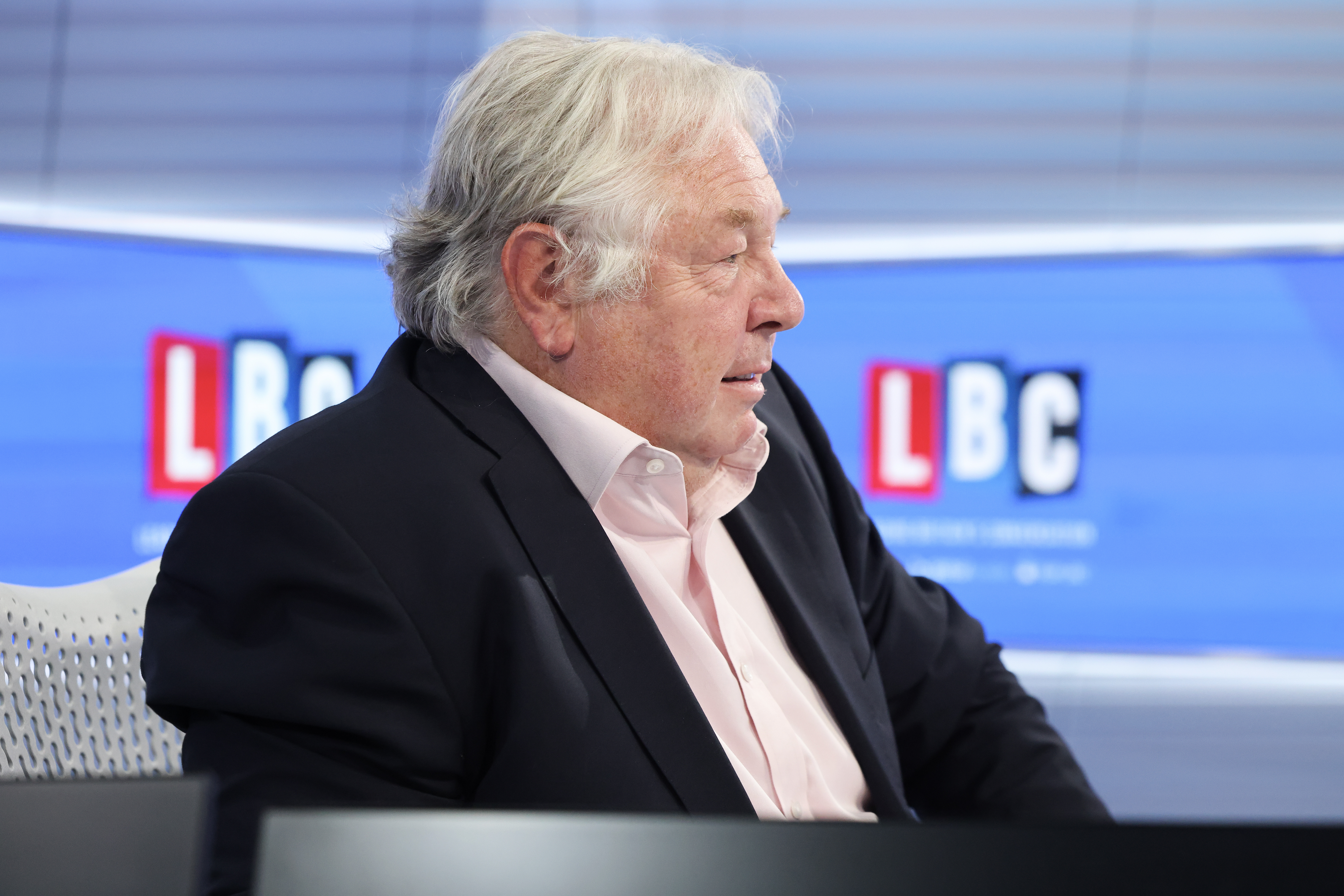
- Ferrari in 2023
- Born: Nicolo Ferrari; 31 January 1959 (age 67); England
- Education: Eltham College
- Occupations: Radio broadcaster; TV presenter; journalist
- Years active: 1981–present
- Known for: Nick Ferrari at Breakfast (LBC)
- Style: Talk radio
- Spouse(s): Sally Templeton (m. 1985, divorced) Clare Goodwin (m. 2025)
- Children: 2
- Awards: Speech broadcaster of the year 2009; Arqiva Gold Award 2010

Nicolo Ferrari (born 31 January 1959) is a British radio host, television presenter and broadcast journalist. He is best known as the host of the weekday breakfast show on the London-based radio station LBC. He also has a regular column in the Sunday Express and was previously a regular guest on The Alan Titchmarsh Show. He regularly appears on ITV's programme This Morning and presented the Sky News debate show The Pledge from 2016 until 2020.

== Early life ==
Ferrari's paternal grandparents emigrated from Switzerland. His father, Lino "Dan" Ferrari, ran a news agency, Ferrari Press Agency, and Nick was keen to work in the media himself. He was educated at Eltham College, a private school for boys in Mottingham in southeast London.

== Career ==
=== Journalism ===
Ferrari became a news reporter on the Sunday Mirror in 1981 and subsequently a show business reporter at The Sun and editor of the paper's "Bizarre" gossip page. During this period, he interviewed Roger Moore on the set of the James Bond film Octopussy (1983) for The Sun and appeared as an extra in the movie. Subsequently, Ferrari became features editor of the News of the World's Sunday magazine and assistant editor of the Daily Mirror. A friend of The Sun's former editor Kelvin MacKenzie, Ferrari joined him at L!VE TV, where he devised such programmes as Topless Darts, the News Bunny mascot and the weather forecast presented by a dwarf on a trampoline.

=== Radio ===
==== Talk Radio ====
Ferrari joined Talk Radio in 1999 as co-presenter of the Big Boys' Breakfast show with David Banks, shortly after the station was purchased by former colleague Kelvin MacKenzie in 1998. The show was scheduled between 6 am and 9 am, and focused on entertainment, rather than news content. In late 1999, it was announced that the show would be cancelled as part of the relaunch of Talk Radio as Talk Sport to focus entirely on sports content.

==== LBC ====
In 2001, Ferrari presented his first breakfast programme on LBC, taking on the role officially in 2004. The programme runs from 7 am to 10 am, taking the format of a news, political debate and discussion show, with the presenter introducing topics before discussing them with both members of the public and experts, via text messaging, email and phone, with the last of the three being the main mode of contact. The programme mixes both light entertainment stories and more serious topics in the news. Ferrari frequently asks first-time callers which station they previously listened to, rejoicing when they have left BBC Radio 4 or BBC London 94.9. Ferrari is also known for deliberately not mentioning the phone number to call the programme while presenting, as he believes it is an unnatural way to speak to listeners.

In the run-up to the 2017 general election, an interview with Shadow Home Secretary Diane Abbott on Ferrari's show made national headlines, after she had struggled to provide figures for police policy. When questioned on the policy, Abbott stated that 10,000 police officers would cost £300,000, before correcting this to £80 million. Ferrari questioned her further on this figure and pointed out that it would only allow for paying each police officer £8,000. In a subsequent article, Ferrari stated that he had banned Abbott from his show due to her failing to appear for previous scheduled interviews, and had only allowed her to feature to aid the balance of subjects interviewed on the programme. Later the same day, the BBC's Daily Politics television programme replayed the interview to Abbott, and she defended her performance, saying: "I did seven interviews this morning. In that seventh interview I misspoke." Ferrari was awarded the 2018 IRN Best Interview award for his role in interviewing Abbott. The judges praised him for "[representing] the role of listeners and voters brilliantly".

=== Television ===
Ferrari presented the discussion programme Forum on Press TV, an Iranian news channel. He quit his show on the station on 30 June 2009 in protest at the reporting of the Iranian presidential election on 12 June 2009.

In 2006, Ferrari also made an appearance on the BBC/HBO comedy show Extras.

Since 2016, Ferrari has appeared on This Morning as a segment presenter, and he regularly appears with the main presenters to review news and other topics.

=== Awards ===
Ferrari's LBC show received the Sony Breakfast Show of the Year award in 2006, as well as the Arqiva Breakfast Show of the year in 2010. Ferrari was also awarded the Sony Speech Broadcaster of the year in 2009. and the Arqiva Gold Award in 2010 for "outstanding contribution to the industry over the last twelve months".

=== Politics ===
It was suggested in June 2006 by Conservative leader David Cameron that, if Ferrari joined the Conservative Party and put himself forward, Ferrari could win the ballot to be the party's candidate for Mayor of London. Ferrari indicated, however, that he would not stand, as he "did not want to leave the listeners". This role was eventually taken by Boris Johnson, who won the election.

Ferrari does not recycle, because the number of recycling bins means "you've lost your front garden", he told the BBC's Daily Politics in 2010.

Ferrari voted to Leave in the 2016 EU membership referendum, but did not agree with the government's settled status fee (which was later scrapped).

In September 2019, Ferrari said, after a visit to Israel, "I'd been given an insight into a country that I've always admired and I now revered".

During his LBC radio show on October 7th, 2026 on the 3 year anniversary of the Hamas attack, Ferrari argued in response to his guest, Ahmed Najar, that Hamas attempted to commit ‘genocide against Israelis’ and that there was ‘genocide on both sides’. Ferrari abruptly ended the interview when his guest cited the UN definition of genocide.

== Regulatory issues ==
In 2003, the Broadcasting Standards Commission upheld a complaint against Ferrari, finding that his programme's "active reinforcement of prejudiced views about asylum seekers had exceeded acceptable boundaries for transmission." Following this, and at a time of frosty relations between Ferrari and the former Mayor of London, Ken Livingstone, the Mayor wrote to the Managing Director of LBC 97.3 asking what measures had been implemented to ensure the situation would not arise again. Livingstone then appeared regularly on Ferrari's programme to answer questions from listeners.

In 2015, Ferrari was investigated by Ofcom after he said on his radio programme that the November 2015 Paris attacks were "a Muslim problem" and told a Muslim caller to "go some place else" if the caller did not agree with UK foreign policy. Ofcom found that Ferrari was not in breach of any broadcasting rules, saying "We found the caller was given an opportunity to rebuke Mr Ferrari's offensive comments, while two other callers also challenged Ferrari in strong terms. In addition, the presenter made clear that he was not characterising all Muslims as extremists or criminals."

== Personal life ==
Ferrari is a supporter of Leicester City.

He married Sally Templeton in 1985; the couple had two sons but later divorced. He married his long-term partner, Clare Goodwin, on 9 August 2025. He lives in Blackheath, London.
