= MFR (radio station) =

British radio station

Coordinates: 57.4803°N 4.2550°W

- Inverness; United Kingdom
- Broadcast area: Moray, Highland, north-west Aberdeenshire
- Frequencies: FM: 96.6 MHz (Speyside); 96.7 MHz (Fraserburgh); 96.7 MHz (Wick); 97.4 MHz (Inverness); 102.5 MHz (Caithness); 102.8 MHz (Keith); DAB: 11B
- RDS: MFR
- Branding: The Biggest Hits The Biggest Throwbacks

Programming
- Format: CHR/pop
- Network: Hits Radio

Ownership
- Owner: Bauer Media Audio UK
- Sister stations: Greatest Hits Radio (The North of Scotland)

History
- First air date: 23 February 1982 (44 years ago)
- Former frequencies: 1107 kHz

Technical information
- Licensing authority: Ofcom

Links
- Webcast: Rayo
- Website: hellorayo.co.uk/mfr/

MFR (Moray Firth Radio) is an Independent Local Radio station based in Inverness, owned and operated by Bauer Media Audio UK as part of the Hits Radio Network. It broadcasts to Moray, Highland and North West Aberdeenshire.

As of September 2025, the station has a weekly audience of 78,000 listeners according to RAJAR.

== History ==
MFR/Moray Firth Radio logo used from 2001 to 2015.

Moray Firth Radio began broadcasting on 23 February 1982. A year later, the station was making a profit. The first voice heard on MFR, shortly after 6:30am on 23 February 1982, was Dave Cochrane. The longest serving presenter on MFR of 33 years was Tich McCooey, leaving on 29 May 2015.

MFR 2 on AM and DAB aired specialist programming until August 2014 on Sunday - Friday evenings with automated music broadcast at all other times. In September 2014, the station axed its specialist output and began carrying programming from Bauer's 'Greatest Hits Network' of Scottish AM stations, switching to the Bauer City 2 network in January 2015. Since January 2019 it is part of the Greatest Hits Radio network and changed its name to the network name in April 2023.

MFR 3 launched on Monday 19 January 2015, broadcasting on DAB and online as a locally branded relay of The Hits aimed at 15-25-year-olds, with opt-outs for advertising. MFR 3 ceased broadcasting on 31 August 2017 and was replaced with a single national feed of The Hits, which was replaced ten months later with Hits Radio.

There used to be six community stations taking MFR:

- Caithness FM (Caithness), used to use 102.5 FM from MFR but now broadcasts under its own licence on 106.5 FM. During downtime, Caithness FM uses Greatest Hits Radio (North of Scotland) for its sustaining service.
- KCR 107.7FM (Keith, Moray), formerly known as Keith Community Radio, used to use 102.8 FM from MFR during evenings but now broadcasts under its own licence 24/7 on 107.7 FM.
- Speysound Radio (Aviemore), used to use 96.6 FM from MFR during evenings but now broadcasts under its own licence 24/7 on 107.1 FM.
- Kinnaird Radio (Fraserburgh), used to use 96.7 FM from MFR during evenings but ceased broadcasting in January 2016.
- Oban FM (Oban) used to use 101.2 FM from MFR during their restricted service licence (RSL) period in October 1992 where MFR was broadcast on 101.2 FM in Oban in the early morning, afternoon and overnight hours, where both MFR and Oban FM carried London-based sustaining service Supergold concurrently through the night. From August 1994, Oban's community radio station no longer relayed MFR as a sustaining service, instead they opt to broadcast Greatest Hits Radio Glasgow & The West from Glasgow during their non-broadcasting hours, from this point onwards until the station ceased broadcasting on 6 July 2024.
- Nevis Radio (Fort William) used to carry MFR as their sustaining service up until the mid-2000s, providing news and overnight service. MFR was broadcast over Nevis Radio's 4 frequencies, 96.6, 97.0, 102.3 & 102.4 FM.

AM transmissions on 1107 kHz ceased on 11 December 2023.

== Programming ==
Networked programming originates from Clyde 1 in Clydebank, Forth 1 in Edinburgh and Hits Radio in London and Manchester.

The station's last regular local programme - the weekday breakfast show with Jodie McCluskey - ended on Friday 29 November 2024.

From 6 January 2025, MFR has simulcast Boogie in the Morning from Forth 1, along with Northsound 1 and Tay FM. Local news, travel updates and advertising are not affected.

=== News ===
MFR broadcasts local news bulletins hourly from 6am to 7pm on weekdays and from 7am to 1pm on Saturdays and Sundays. Headlines are broadcast on the half hour during weekday breakfast and drivetime shows, alongside sport and traffic bulletins.

National bulletins from Sky News Radio are carried overnight with bespoke networked Scottish bulletins at weekends, produced from Radio Clyde's newsroom in Clydebank.
