= Lesley Ashmall =

Scottish reporter for BBC Radio 5 Live

Lesley Christine Ashmall (born 31 December 1966) is a Scottish reporter for BBC Radio 5 Live.

== Early life ==
She attended Morrison's Academy, a co-educational independent school in Crieff, from 1979 to 1984. Her father is Harry Ashmall, who was headmaster of her former school from 1979 and of Forfar Academy from 1971–79, and has represented the World Council of Churches as a Moderator, and worked with UNICEF UK.

She studied at the University of Glasgow.

== Career ==
=== Radio ===
She has worked at Radio 5 Live since 1995. She's also worked as a reporter for BBC News in general and as a Reporter on the Victoria Derbyshire TV programme. From April 2006 until December 2008 she co-presented The Weekend News on 5 Live from 8pm-10pm on Saturdays and Sundays with John Pienaar. Her position on this programme would be taken from January 2009 by Dalya Raphael when BBC 5 Live moved to Salford, with other broadcasts later by Justine Greene, Laura Maxwell, and Chloe Tilley. Lesley Ashmall left the BBC in 2020 and is now a Communications Manager with the Police and Crime Commissioner in Kent.

== Personal life ==
She lives in south-east London. She is married. She has a sister.
