= Liz Green (broadcaster) =

- Born: Elizabeth Green; Huddersfield, West Yorkshire
- Presenting career
- Country: United Kingdom

Liz Green is a British-Irish broadcaster and journalist who worked for BBC Radio Leeds.

== Early life ==
Green was born and grew up in Huddersfield and has British and Irish heritage.

== Career ==
Liz Green hosted a lunchtime radio programme for BBC Radio Leeds that included a feature known as The Hot Seat, a weekly hour-long interview on Fridays at 12pm. Her radio work also featured an interview segment called Up Close is which was a-one-on-one interview with a member of the public from the region with an interesting life story. Notable interviewees on Liz Green's show include the Dalai Lama, David Cameron and Nick Clegg. Green won the BBC's Local or Regional Broadcaster of the Year (Gold) in 1994.

Prior to hosting weekday lunchtimes, Liz presented Breakfast on BBC Radio Leeds for five years. The show won Bronze at the Audio and Radio Industry Awards in 2017. The same year, she spoke of crime levels in Huddersfield.
