= Angus Stickler =

British journalist

Angus Stickler (born 1964) was the lead reporter for the Bureau of Investigative Journalism until his resignation in December 2012. In 2006 he was named News Journalist of the Year at the 24th Sony Radio Academy Awards. In 2011 he won the UACES/Thomson Reuters Reporting Europe prize for the Bureau's investigation into EU structural funds. In 2011 he won an Amnesty International Media Award for his work on the Bureau's website.

== BBC Newsnight ==
Stickler made the headlines in November 2012 when an investigation he led for the BBC programme Newsnight was found to have falsely implicated a former senior Conservative politician in the North Wales child abuse scandal.

The person who was the focus of the Newsnight broadcast was widely identified on the internet as the former Conservative Party Treasurer Lord McAlpine. Lord McAlpine issued a statement strongly denying the accusations. This allegation was subsequently admitted by the BBC to be false.

The broadcasting of the false claim led to the resignation of George Entwistle as Director-General of the BBC on 10 November 2012. Lord Patten, Chairman of the BBC Trust, described the report as "unacceptable shoddy journalism".

Stickler resigned from the Bureau in light of the Newsnight report.
