= Nevis Radio =

Community radio station in Fort William, Scotland

Coordinates: 56.825°N 5.086°W

- Fort William; United Kingdom
- Broadcast area: Lochaber, North Argyll, parts of the Isle of Mull and Isle of Skye
- Frequencies: FM: 96.6 MHz (Fort William); 97.0 MHz (Rannoch Moor); 102.3 MHz (South Skye, Mallaig, Arisaig); 102.4 MHz (Loch Leven, Ardgour, Sunart); 103.3 MHz (North Argyll)
- RDS: Nevis
- Branding: Across the West Coast

Programming
- Format: Varied

Ownership
- Owner: Self owned

History
- First air date: 1 August 1994 (31 years ago)

Technical information
- Licensing authority: Ofcom

Links
- Website: www.nevisradio.co.uk

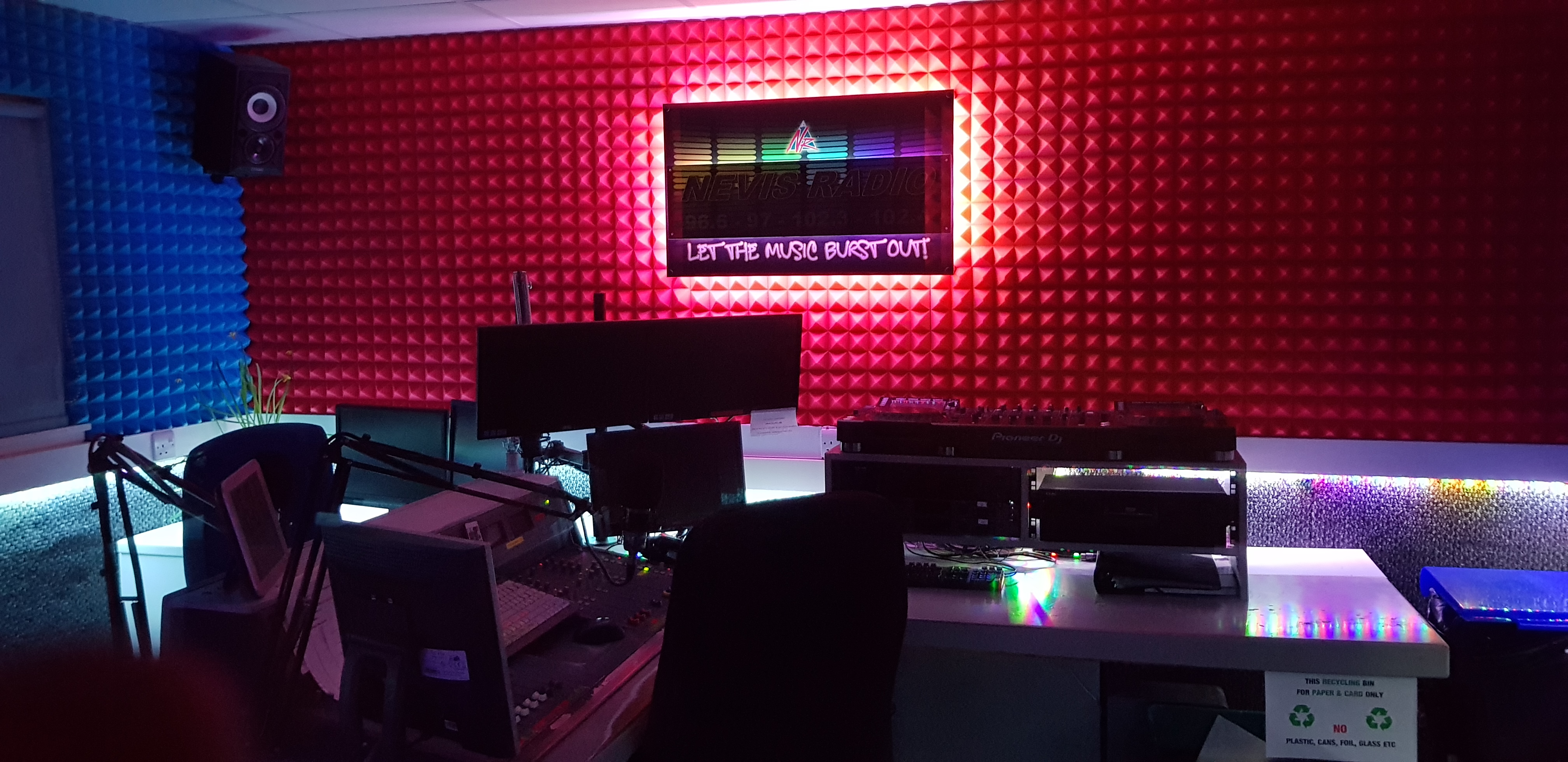
Nevis Radio studio

Nevis Radio is a community radio station based in Fort William. It broadcasts to a wide area of the Western Highlands, including Fort William, Oban, Mallaig, Kinlochleven, Glencoe, Strontian, and parts of the Isle of Mull and Isle of Skye. The station also streams live on the internet.

Nevis Radio broadcasts 24 hours a day from the Ben Nevis Industrial Estate in Fort William, with local programming for most of the day, and automated repeats and music service at other times. It is a registered charity with OSCR No. SC044464.

== History ==
Nevis Radio started out in 1992 as Ski FM from the Nevis Range ski resort, keeping skiers up to date with conditions on Aonach Mòr. This was then followed by Holiday FM during the summer. Those behind the station's trial broadcasts soon realized that Lochaber needed a permanent voice on the radio, and Nevis Community Radio Action Group was formed to raise funds to establish a full-time local radio station.

Nevis Radio was awarded a local commercial radio license for Fort William and Lochaber in 1994, and started full-time year-round operation. The station expanded its coverage area in 1997 by launching relay transmitters, covering Loch Leven, Rannoch Moor and South Skye/Mallaig. In 2012, Nevis Radio successfully applied to Ofcom for relicensing as a community radio station.

Following the closure of Oban FM in July 2024, Nevis Radio launched in North Argyll on 21 May 2025.

== Events ==
Nevis Radio broadcasts from various events in and around its coverage area. Annually, the station broadcasts from the Scottish Six Days Trial, during which the breakfast show airs live from the event.

Other events include the Argyll Food Festival, Oban and Lochaber Pride, Oban Christmas Lights, and various Highland Games and Agricultural shows.

== Programming ==
Nevis Radio broadcasts a national news service from Sky News on the hour, plus local news provided during daytime hours, using unattributed news stories taken directly from local papers the Lochaber Times and The Press and Journal.

Regular traffic and travel updates and What's On's feature during the day.
