= BBC Radio Norfolk =

- Norwich; England
- Broadcast area: Norfolk
- Frequencies: FM: 95.1 MHz (Norwich and East Norfolk); FM: 95.6 MHz (North Norfolk); FM: 104.4 MHz (West Norfolk); AM: 873 kHz (West Norfolk) (until the end of November 2026); DAB: 10B (Norfolk); DAB+: 9C (King's Lynn); Freeview: 711
- RDS: BBC Nrfk

Programming
- Language: English
- Format: Local news and talk

Ownership
- Owner: BBC Local Radio, BBC East

History
- First air date: 11 September 1980
- Former frequencies: 96.7 FM; 855 MW; 1602 MW

Technical information
- Licensing authority: Ofcom

Links
- Website: BBC Radio Norfolk

BBC Radio Norfolk is the BBC's local radio station serving the county of Norfolk.

It broadcasts on FM, AM (until the end of November 2026), DAB, digital TV and via BBC Sounds from studios at The Forum in Norwich.

According to RAJAR, the station has a weekly audience of 131,000 listeners and a 6.8% share as of December 2023.

== History ==
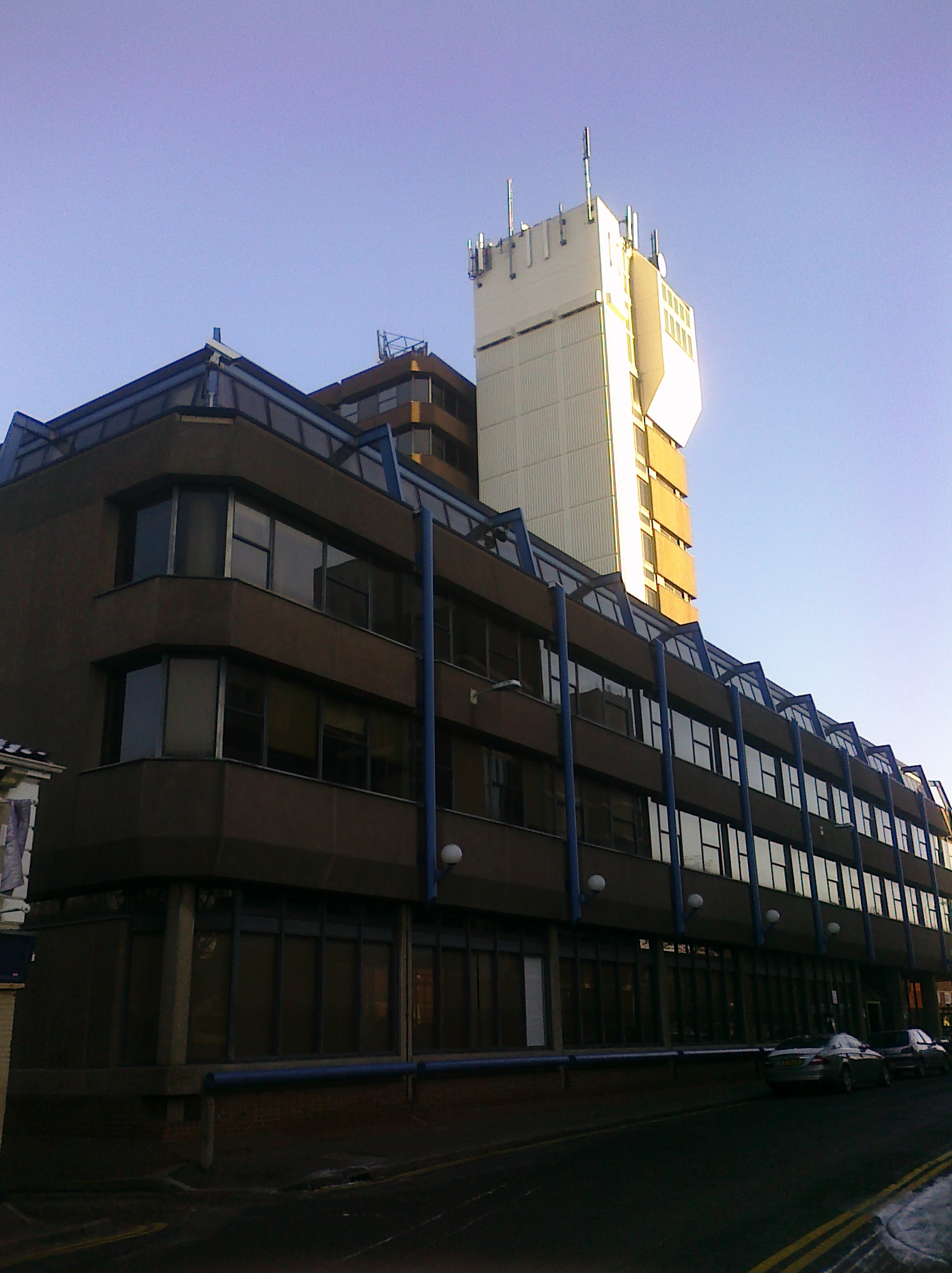
Norfolk Tower on Surrey Street in Norwich. BBC Radio Norfolk was based on its ground floor from 1980 until 2003.

BBC Local Radio originally launched in 1967 but it was not until more than a decade later that local radio in East Anglia was to become a reality. Therefore, the BBC's only radio coverage of the East Anglia throughout this period was a regional weekday breakfast show opt-out from BBC Radio 4 called Roundabout East Anglia, plus five-minute summaries at lunchtime and teatime. It covered the same area as the BBC's Look East regional television news programme. Like Look East, Roundabout East Anglia also broadcast from BBC East's regional headquarters at All Saint's Green in Norwich.

The BBC's desire to expand its local radio network was stalled in the late 1970s by a governmental review of local radio. However, when expansion was allowed once again, a policy existed whereby only one local station would launch at the same time in any one area so when it came to choosing whether Norfolk or Devon would receive a BBC or commercial station first, there was contention between the BBC and the Independent Broadcasting Authority (IBA) as to who would get which area. This was settled by the toss of a coin, with the BBC winning and choosing Norfolk.

BBC Radio Norfolk was the first BBC station in England to launch since 1973 when it went on air at 17:55 on 11 September 1980. The station's first presenter on air was John Mountford and the launch was simulcast live on Look East. Mountford was one of several former Roundabout East Anglia personnel who transferred to the new station following that programme's demise. From launch, the station broadcast stereo (though only to east Norfolk; the remainder of the county had to wait until 2005) and was the first BBC Local station to broadcast with stereo sound.

Initially, there was insufficient budget for a full schedule, with broadcasts at first restricted to a breakfast show, a two-hour show at midday and an extended 5pm news and sports bulletin. BBC Radio 2 was carried at all other times. There was, however, a full local service at weekends, when it was assumed more listeners would be available. After Keith Salmon took over as the station's managing editor in 1982, full local programmes began on weekdays.

Originally, Radio Norfolk was at a former carpet showroom in Norfolk Tower on Surrey Street in Norwich and in June 2003 the station moved to The Forum in Norwich.

=== Notable programmes and presenters ===
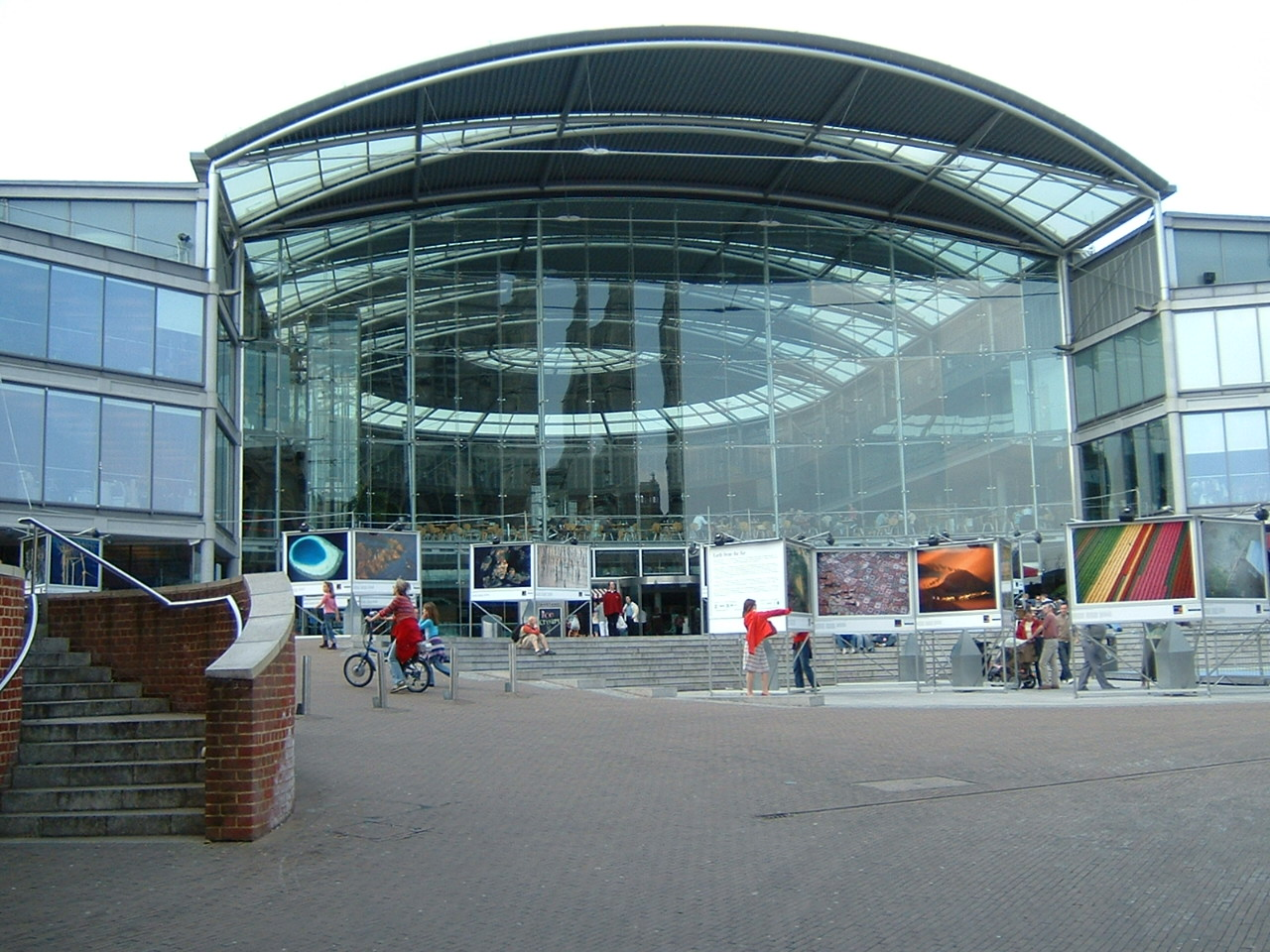
The Forum, on Millennium Plain in Norwich, where BBC Radio Norfolk has been based since June 2003. The BBC occupy the wing of the building seen on the left-hand side of the picture.

Roy Waller presented a weekday afternoon show from the early 1980s until 2009, which led to his being one of the best-known and most popular voices in the county, described by the Eastern Daily Press as "a household name." Waller also hosted a Saturday morning country music programme, Rodeo Norfolk, which he continued to present following his departure from the weekday show, until ill health forced him to step down. Waller's funeral in July 2010 was held at Norwich Cathedral and was attended by over 1,500 mourners.

From the early days of Radio Norfolk until 2007, Waller was the station's commentator for Norwich City matches, known as "the voice of Carrow Road". The station devotes extensive coverage to Norwich City, the county's only professional football team, providing live coverage of all league and cup matches, as well as a post-match phone-in show Canary Call and fanzine show The Scrimmage, both of which are regarded as amongst the station's most popular programmes. In 2011, when BBC economy measures raised the idea that local radio football commentaries could be cut back, the possibility was criticised by the local press in Norfolk, praising the station for the passion of its commentaries.

The Norfolk Airline, presented by David Clayton and Neil Walker, was the station's first mid-morning programme, launched in 1983. In April 1986, the programme won the Sony Radio Academy Award for Best Magazine Programme, ahead of BBC Radio 4's A Small Country Living and Capital Radio's The Way It Is. The programme also made the news itself, when James Prior announced his resignation as Secretary of State for Northern Ireland live during a show.

The station won its second Radio Academy Award 28 years later in 2014, for Local Radio Journalist of the Year. The success of Airline eventually led to Clayton and Walker departing to make programmes for national radio on Radio 4.

From 1995 until his death in 2006, presenter and journalist John Mills presented Midday With Mills, a consumer affairs programme. The show gained a strong reputation for solving listeners' consumer problems, and in 2000 was given the British Insurance Brokers' Association Media Award for its work in this area.

From 1984 until 2009, BBC Look East presenter Stewart White was the presenter of the station's Saturday breakfast show. White was the first presenter to go on-air after the station moved studios from Norfolk Tower to The Forum in the summer of 2003.

=== Managing editors ===
BBC Radio Norfolk has had five managing editors. The founding editor was Mike Chaney, appointed at the beginning of 1980 to oversee the setting-up of the radio station. Chaney had previously been working on the Today programme at BBC Radio 4, but lost his role there during a behind-the-scenes shake-up. In recompense for this, Chaney was promised the editorship of a BBC local radio station, and was given the job at Norfolk. Before working on Today, he had been the founding editor of BBC Radio 1's Newsbeat programme in 1973, and prior to this had worked as a journalist for The Sun newspaper.

Chaney was succeeded in 1982 by Keith Salmon, who had been working at BBC Radio Oxford. He had first joined the BBC in 1961, and had also worked at the BBC Radiophonic Workshop, the BBC's famous electronic music and sound effects department in London. At Oxford, Salmon had been a presenter and the programme organiser. He remained managing editor of BBC Radio Norfolk for thirteen years, until his retirement in 1995.

Tim Bishop had a background in local newspapers in Norfolk, having worked on the Eastern Daily Press and been the news editor for the Norwich Evening News, before joining the BBC in 1994. Immediately prior to becoming the managing editor of BBC Radio Norfolk, Bishop had been the Education Correspondent for Look East. He subsequently returned to the television side of BBC East's operations, and then became the Head of Regional and Local Programmes for the area in 2002. David Clayton became BBC Radio Norfolk's managing editor in 1998, having been a broadcaster at the station since the early 1980s and the Assistant Editor under Salmon and then Bishop since 1991. During Clayton's period in charge of the station, it gained its highest ever listening figures.

Clayton was replaced in March 2016 by Peter Cook, who combines his role as managing editor for both BBC Radio Norfolk and BBC Radio Suffolk.

== Impact ==
=== Audience ===
BBC Radio Norfolk has frequently claimed some of the highest audience figures of any of the BBC's local radio stations in England. Figures from the radio audience measuring body RAJAR have regularly shown that over 200,000 people in Norfolk listen to some part of the station's output in any given week. When criticising proposed BBC local radio cutbacks in December 2011, South Norfolk MP Richard Bacon claimed in a letter to Lord Patten, the Chairman of the BBC Trust, that only Radio 2 claimed a bigger audience in Norfolk than BBC Radio Norfolk.

=== Awards and accolades ===
BBC Radio Norfolk has twice won categories at the main industry awards, the Radio Academy Awards (formerly the Sony Awards). The "Best Magazine Programme" category was won by The Norfolk Airline in 1986, and in 2014, the station won its second Gold Award at the event, when the news team collectively won the "Local Radio Journalist of the Year" category. In 2010, wildlife expert Chris Skinner was runner-up in the Best Specialist Contributor category for his broadcasts as part of Matthew Gudgin's programme. In 2004, Today in Norfolk was nominated in the Best Breakfast Show category, while in 2006, BBC Radio Norfolk as a whole was a nominee for the Station of the Year Award.

BBC Radio Norfolk has also won success at the Frank Gillard Awards, the BBC's own internal awards for its local radio stations. In 2010, the station's Sophie Price won the Original Journalism category for a documentary she had made about teenage pregnancy in Norfolk. In 2002, the station was the runner-up in the Best Radio Feature category for Liberators, and in 2006, took another silver, when David Clayton's Norfolk Years programme was the runner-up in the Best Interactive Programme category.

Local and regional awards have included a win in the Best Radio Programme category at the 2009 Creative East Awards for the show Treasure Quest. At the 2006 EDF Energy East of England Media Awards, the station's Paul Moseley won the Radio Journalist of the Year award. He repeated this feat in 2007, becoming the first two-time winner of the award. In 2009, Nikki Fox won the title, and at the 2010 ceremony, Nicky Price was joint-winner of the Sports Journalist of the Year category, while the Nick Conrad show took the Radio News / Current Affairs Programme of the Year title.

At the Parliamentary Jazz Awards in 2011, presenter Paul Barnes won the Broadcaster of the Year category for his show The Late Paul Barnes, broadcast from BBC Radio Norfolk, but shared across the BBC East region.

=== Criticism ===
Keith Skipper, a former presenter on the station until he left in 1995, has criticised Radio Norfolk for a lack of local focus to some of its programming. In an article published in the Eastern Daily Press in February 2012, Norwich City Independent Supporters Club chairman Robin Sainty described the station's post-match phone-in programme Canary Call as "audio surrealism", criticising the quality of callers phoning in with their views.

== District offices ==
=== Great Yarmouth ===
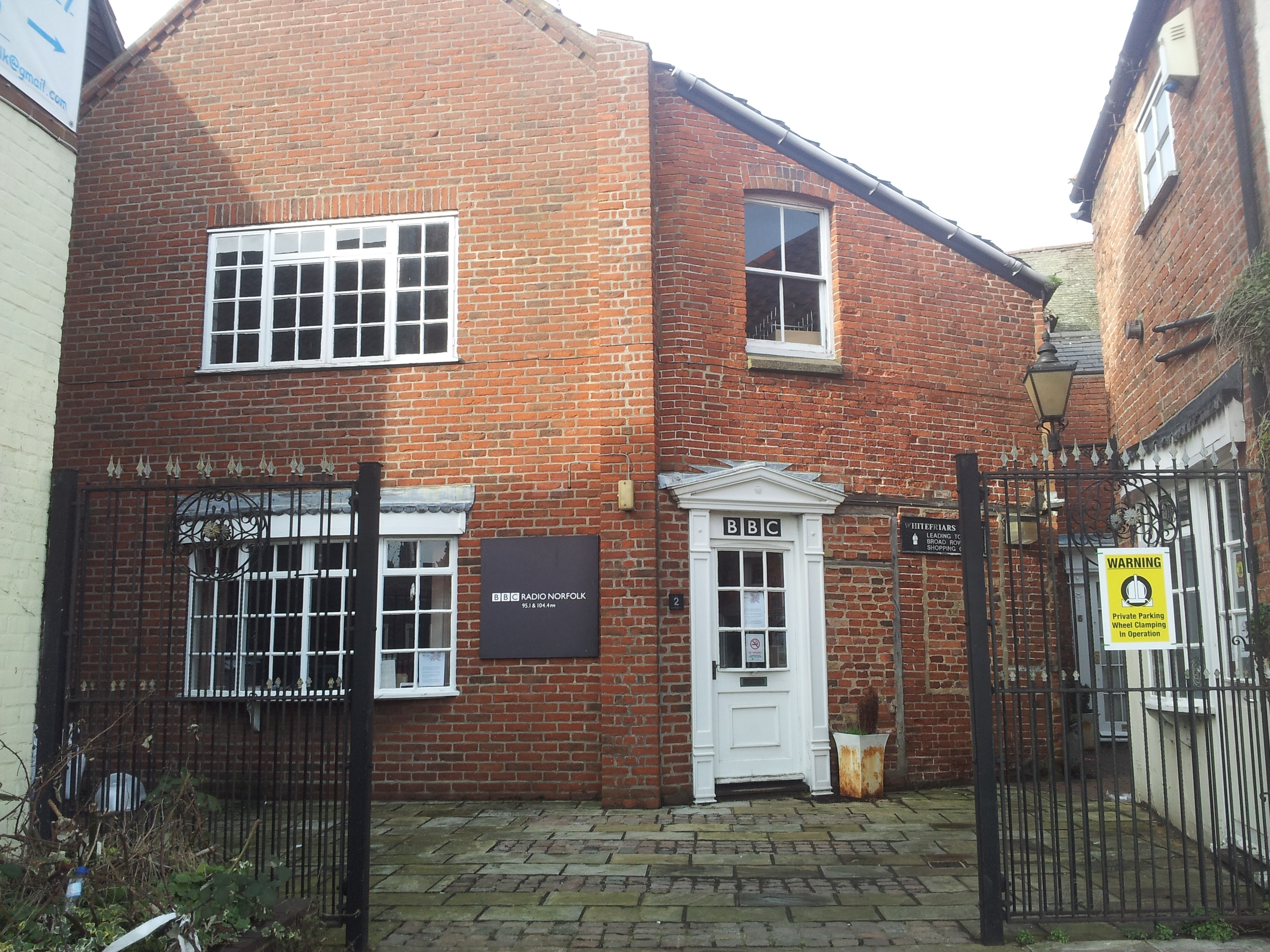
2 Whitefriars Court on Stonecutters Way in Great Yarmouth, BBC Radio Norfolk's district office and studio in the town from 1984 until 2017.

In the early 1980s, BBC Radio Norfolk had a small office for the district reporter based in Great Yarmouth, situated in the premises of the Port and Haven Commissioners on the town's South Quay. A more substantial Great Yarmouth presence opened in the summer of 1984. This was a district office and studio at Whitefriars Court on Stonecutters Way in the town. The studio there was used for live inserts into programmes from Norwich, interviews with guests from the Great Yarmouth area, and the preparation of pre-recorded items by the Great Yarmouth district reporter. The studio was also occasionally used for full live programmes. At one point, the Great Yarmouth office had a staff of three; a receptionist, a producer and a reporter. Latterly, it was a one-person operation staffed only by the district reporter. After 33 years of operation, the office and studio at Stonecutters Way was closed in April 2017.

=== King's Lynn ===
The station's initial office in King's Lynn was located in a portable building situated behind the town hall. This was later replaced by a more substantial studio in the town's Tuesday Market Place. The King's Lynn district office and studio later moved to the North Lynn Business Village. Some programmes would be broadcast from the King's Lynn studio once a week.

== Technical ==
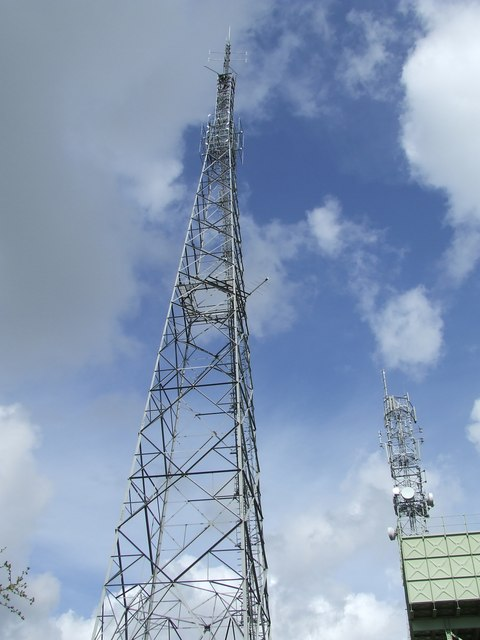
The transmission tower at Great Massingham.

The 95.1 FM signal covers east and South Norfolk, 104.4 FM covers West Norfolk, while 95.6 FM (which came on-air on 12 September 2005) serves North Norfolk.

Since 31 March 2003, DAB signals originate from the NOW Digital Norfolk multiplex, originally broadcast on block 11B before moving to 10B on 10 September 2015. DAB coverage in West Norfolk is incomplete but was expanded on 29 February 2024 when the station launched in DAB+ on the King's Lynn small-scale DAB multiplex.

The station also broadcasts on Freeview TV channel 711 in the BBC East and BBC Yorkshire and Lincolnshire regions and streams online via BBC Sounds.

In January 2020, the BBC announced that Radio Norfolk's medium wave (AM) service from Postwick on 855 kHz covering the eastern part of the county, would close later in the year. The transmitter was switched off, after a period of service just short of 40 years, on the morning of 9 April 2020. The transmitter on 873 kHz will close at the end of November 2026, as part of the final phase of BBC Local Radio's switch-off of medium wave transmissions.

== Timeline ==
- 11 September 1980 – BBC Radio Norfolk begins broadcasting at 5:55 pm from Norfolk Tower, Surrey Street, Norwich on 95.1 MHz VHF (FM) & 855 kHz (351m) MW / AM to East Norfolk, plus 1602 kHz (187m) MW / AM to West Norfolk. There were no FM transmissions to West Norfolk.
- 12 September 1980 – Terry Wogan presents his BBC Radio 2 breakfast show live from the new station's studios.
- 1982 – MW / AM frequency in West Norfolk changed from 1602 kHz (187m) to 873 kHz (344m) MW / AM.
- 1984 – FM transmissions begin in West Norfolk on 96.7 MHz. These transmissions were broadcast in mono due to an off-air re-broadcast system. This picked up the Tacolneston 95.1 FM broadcast and re-transmitted it, but was unable to reproduce a clear noise free stereo signal.
- 1986 – West Norfolk FM frequency changed from 96.7 to 104.4 MHz (the mono broadcasts continued).
- 1992 – The King's Lynn studio moves from Tuesday Marketplace to the North Lynn Business Village.
- 2000 – Tacolneston transmissions cease and Stoke Holy Cross transmissions commence. These continue on 95.1 MHz FM but at slightly less transmitter power.
- 27 June 2003 – Radio Norfolk ceases broadcasting from the original Norfolk Tower studios.
- 28 June 2003 – Radio Norfolk starts broadcasting from the new BBC studios on the 1st floor at The Forum, Millennium Plain, Norwich. Look East presenter Stewart White is the first voice on air.
- 12 September 2005 – As part of BBC Radio Norfolk's 25th birthday celebrations, the West Runton transmitter launches a new FM frequency (95.6 MHz) for North Norfolk.
- October / November 2005 – Stereo FM broadcast for West Norfolk begin on 104.4 MHz FM.
- 27 April 2007 – Chris Moyles presents his BBC Radio 1 Breakfast Show from the station's studios, and Moyles' newsreader Dominic Byrne co-hosts on BBC Radio Norfolk with Nicky Barnes.
- 16 March 2020 – Radio Norfolk programmes cease on 855 kHz, with a retune loop (voiced by Chrissie Jackson) then broadcast on this frequency until 9 April 2020.
- 29 February 2024 – Radio Norfolk's DAB coverage expands to King's Lynn and surrounding areas, following its launch in DAB+ on the King's Lynn multiplex.
- End of November 2026 - Radio Norfolk ceases broadcasts on 873 kHz medium wave.

== Programming ==
Following BBC cuts in 2023 local programming is produced and broadcast from the BBC's Norwich studios from 6 am to 2 pm on weekdays.

Other programming is shared with sister stations in the BBC East and BBC Yorkshire and Lincolnshire regions. The station also simulcasts Sunday evening output from BBC Essex.

During the station's downtime, BBC Radio Norfolk simulcasts overnight programming from BBC Radio 5 Live and BBC Radio London.

== Presenters ==
=== Notable former presenters ===
- Andy Archer
- Rob Bonnet
- Tom Edwards
- Helen McDermott
- Keith Skues
- Roy Waller
- Stewart White
- David Whiteley
