= Roundabout East Anglia =

Discontinued BBC radio programme for eastern England

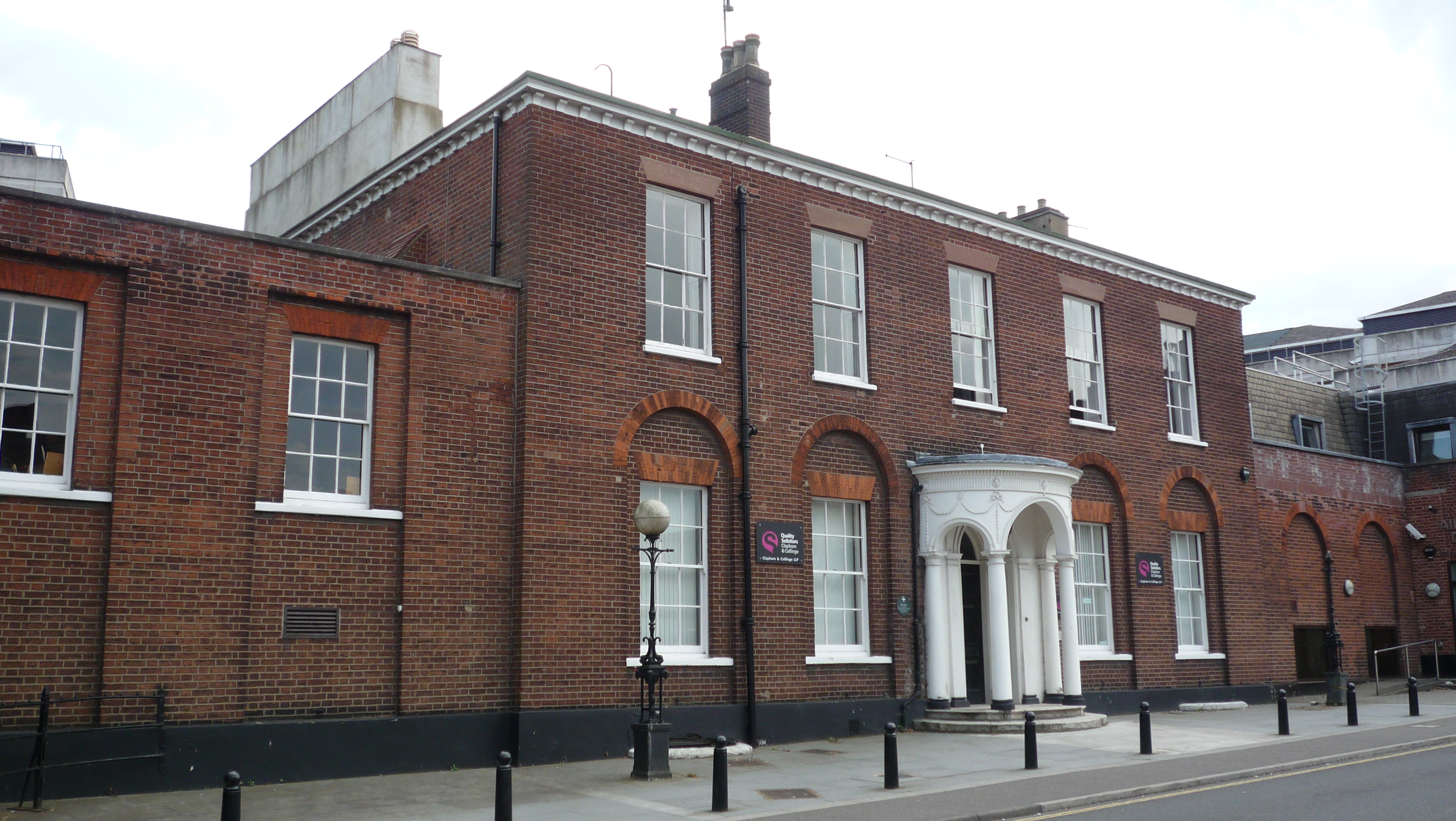
St Catherine's House on All Saints Green in Norwich, pictured in 2012. In the 1970s this was the regional headquarters of BBC East, from where Roundabout East Anglia was broadcast throughout its run.

Roundabout East Anglia was a BBC Radio programme providing news and current affairs coverage for the East Anglia region of England during the 1970s. It was broadcast on the area's VHF frequencies of BBC Radio 4 as a regional opt-out replacing the Today programme, running from 6.45am to 8.45am each weekday morning.

The programme covered roughly the same geographical area as the BBC's television news programme Look East. It was also broadcast from the same building as Look East, BBC East's regional headquarters at All Saint's Green in Norwich. Presenters who worked on Roundabout East Anglia included Ellis Hill, John Mountford, and Christopher Trace. In addition to the news items there was also lighter, more features-based content such as advice from gardening experts.

Roundabout East Anglia came to an end in 1980. This was due both to BBC budgetary cutbacks in regional broadcasting, and because a dedicated BBC Local Radio service was to be introduced to part of the area for the first time, with BBC Radio Norfolk launching in September 1980. Several Roundabout East Anglia personnel transferred to working for Radio Norfolk when that service began, with John Mountford becoming the station's first breakfast show presenter. However, it wasn't until 1990 that Suffolk got its own local BBC radio station.

A look back at the programme's history was broadcast in 2012 on BBC Radio Norfolk and John Mountford was one of the presenters who was interviewed for the programme.

== See also ==
- Morning Sou'West
