= Sue Welfare =

English romantic fiction writer

Susan Welfare (born 1963) is an English romantic fiction writer who also writes under the pseudonyms Kate Lawson and Gemma Fox. She is also the creator of BBC Radio Norfolk's first audio drama Little Bexham. She attended Downham Market Grammar School and has lived in Norfolk all her life.

== Writing career ==
Welfare began her career writing freelance articles for a variety of magazines including Practical Crafts and Young Soldier before writing erotic fiction for top shelf magazines. In 1995, she had her first full-length novel published by Black Lace and won the Mail on Sunday opening of a novel competition.

Her first mainstream novel, A Few Little Lies, was published by HarperCollins in 1998. In 2004, she began writing under the name Gemma Fox publishing Hot Pursuit, also through HarperCollins. In 2007, she wrote the BBC Radio Norfolk drama Little Bexham under the name Sue Welfare. In 2008, she wrote as Kate Lawson, with Mum's the Word published by Avon. She teaches writing at the University of East Anglia.

== Novels ==
=== As Sue Welfare ===
- A Few Little Lies (1998)
- Just Desserts (1998)
- Off the Record (1999)
- Moving on Up (2000)
- Guilty Creatures (2001)
- Fallen Women (2002)
- Double Or Quits (2004)
- The Surprise Party (2011)

=== As Kate Lawson ===
- Mum's the Word (2008)
- Lessons in Love (2008)
- Keeping Mum (2009)
- Mother of the Bride (2010)

=== As Gemma Fox ===
- Hot Pursuit (2004)
- Caught in the Act (2005)
- The Cinderella Moment (2006)
