= John Mountford =

John Mountford may refer to:

- John Mountford (broadcaster) (born 1949), a British television executive and former broadcaster
- John Mountford (politician) (1933–2022), a former member of the Australian House of Representatives
