= Stewart White (journalist) =

British journalist and broadcaster

Stewart Mark White
- Born: Stewart White; 18 April 1947 (age 79); Salisbury, Wiltshire, England
- Occupations: Journalist, broadcaster
- Notable credit: Look East

Stewart White (born 18 April 1947) is a British journalist and broadcaster, best known for presenting the East Anglian regional BBC News programme Look East for 37 years.

Beginning his career at several local BBC Radio stations, he later became a presenter and continuity announcer for ATV and Central Television.

In 1984, he became the lead presenter on Look East, where he remained until his sudden departure in September 2021. He became the longest-serving BBC regional news presenter following Chris Vacher's retirement from Points West in 2011.

== Early life ==
He was born and educated in the cathedral city of Salisbury. His first job was at a grocers.

== Career ==
=== Radio ===
White's first job for the BBC was a live introduction to a Vietnamese television programme on the BBC World Service. From this he began a career working for BBC Radio, first at Radio Brighton, and later, Radio Derby, where he produced and presented several different programmes.

He left to present the daily mid-morning show on the Birmingham radio station BRMB. There, he interviewed such people as former Prime Minister Edward Heath, actress Joan Collins and singer Michael Jackson. He was also the last journalist in Britain to conduct a live interview with Jackson. White also presented a weekly country music show on the local commercial radio station Mercia Sound in Coventry and Warwickshire.

=== Television ===
White made the transition from radio to television by joining ATV as a continuity announcer and worked on a number of programmes including Star Soccer, Something Different as well as presenting several documentaries.

After ATV was replaced by Central Television in 1982, White stayed at the channel, becoming the first human to appear on the satirical puppet show Spitting Image, in back-to-back episodes. For several years, he provided football updates for BBC Radio 5 Live from East Anglia, and presented a weekly programme on BBC Radio Norfolk.

=== Look East ===
In 1984, White moved back to the BBC to become a main presenter for Look East. Whilst at Look East, White was involved in two minor controversies relating to swearing live on air. In July 2002, when White was interviewing a member of the Cambridgeshire County Council, a feed from one of the show's video editors in the production gantry was accidentally broadcast; the editor was shouting multiple expletives at the time. The following month a prerecorded rehearsal of the Look East headlines (which featured White exclaiming "bugger" after making a mistake) was broadcast by mistake.

As presenter of Look East, White has hosted a number regional events, including the east's coverage of Children in Need, and other charitable evenings.

His journalism has won him several awards. He received a Lifetime Achievement Award from the BBC Nations and Regions Ruby Television Awards in 2006, and has also won a Creative Industries' Media Personality of the Year Award. He won the Royal Television Society Television Personality of the Year in 2003 and Television News Presenter of the Year in 2000. He was nominated for the Royal Television Society Award for Presenter of the Year in 2007, but lost out to Jeremy Paxman. He won the RTS award for Regional Television Presenter of the Year in 2013, and again in 2014.

On 30 September 2021, White suddenly announced his departure from Look East at the end of the 6:30pm programme, after 37 years with BBC East.

In a November 2021 interview with Iain Dale for an LBC podcast, White revealed the only other person who knew about his departure in advance was the editor of Look East, and he left the Norwich studios immediately after that night's programme.

== Personal life ==
White is married to Jane and has two daughters and a son. He lives in Norfolk and is an avid golf player.

White and his wife are vegetarians. His wife was the secretary of Brian Clough and they met when in Derby.
