= West Norfolk =

- Proposed unitary authority area
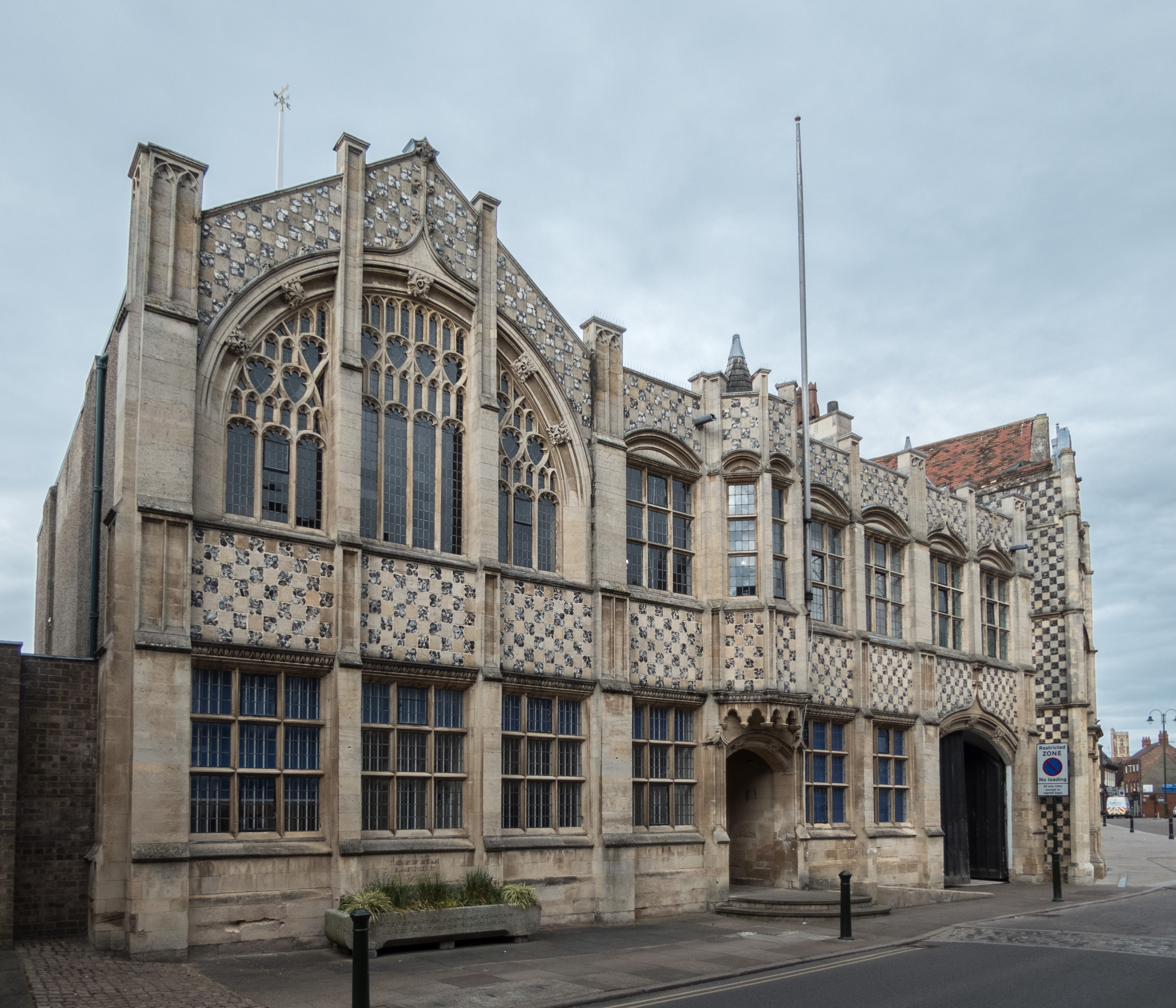
- King's Lynn

- West Norfolk shown within Norfolk
- Interactive map
- Coordinates: 52.63°N 0.98°E
- Sovereign state: United Kingdom
- Country: England
- Region: East
- Ceremonial county: Norfolk

Government
  - Type: Unitary authority
  - Body: West Norfolk Council

Population (2024 estimate)
  - Total: 309,737
- Time zone: UTC+0 (GMT)
  - Summer (DST): UTC+1 (BST)

West Norfolk was a proposed unitary authority area in Norfolk, England. It was scheduled to be created as part of ongoing local government reform. It would have been formed from three existing districts: Breckland, King's Lynn and West Norfolk, and 9 parishes from South Norfolk. Upon its creation, the new district would have bordered the other proposed districts in Norfolk, Greater Norwich and East Norfolk; Western Suffolk and Central and Eastern Suffolk; and planned unitary authority areas in Lincolnshire and Cambridgeshire.

The first councillors would have been elected in May 2027, and the new authority would have assumed full powers in April 2028. The largest settlement in the district would have been King's Lynn.

It was being formed as part of ongoing local government changes throughout England, in which all areas of the country that have separate county councils and district councils will see those replaced with single-tier, or unitary, local governance. The government did not accept alternative proposals for a single unitary authority and a two unitary authorities for Norfolk.

The King's Lynn part of the current "King's Lynn and West Norfolk" district is currently unparished but there is a proposal to set up a town council, while the rest of the district is parished. The area has a population of 309,847.

In September 2026, the Norfolk proposals were withdrawn by the government in light of new legal advice. The decision was threatened with judicial review by Norfolk County Council and South Norfolk Council.

== Settlements ==
The towns of the district would have been:

- Attleborough
- Dereham
- Downham Market
- Hunstanton
- King's Lynn
- Swaffham
- Thetford
- Watton
