= John Mountford (broadcaster) =

John Mountford (born 14 February 1949 in Stoke-on-Trent, Staffordshire) is a British television executive and former broadcaster. His father, Arnold Mountford, was an acclaimed international expert in British ceramics.

Mountford studied English literature at Queen's University Belfast. In 1973 he enrolled on a studio manager's training scheme at BBC World Service in London, soon progressing to producing and presenting programmes on the international radio network. In the 1970s he worked on BBC East's daily morning radio programme Roundabout East Anglia, a regional opt-out from the Today programme on BBC Radio 4.

In a gradual move to television, he became a researcher on The Book Programme and Sixty Minutes. In 1983 Mountford was amongst the line up of presenters on the BBC's first breakfast television show, Breakfast Time. He was also a reporter for Esther Rantzen's That's Family Life. Mountford was the inaugural voice to air at the launch of BBC Radio Norfolk in 1980 where he continued to have a regular show for several years alongside co-hosting BBC1's Friday night magazine show, Weekend; famously 'baring all' on a nudist beach in the opening title sequence of the programme.

He began to scale down his broadcasting commitments during the late 1980s. Mountford is currently chief executive of a production company in Norwich making television advertising and branded video content for social media applications.
