= The Forum, Norwich =

Community building in Norwich, England

The Forum
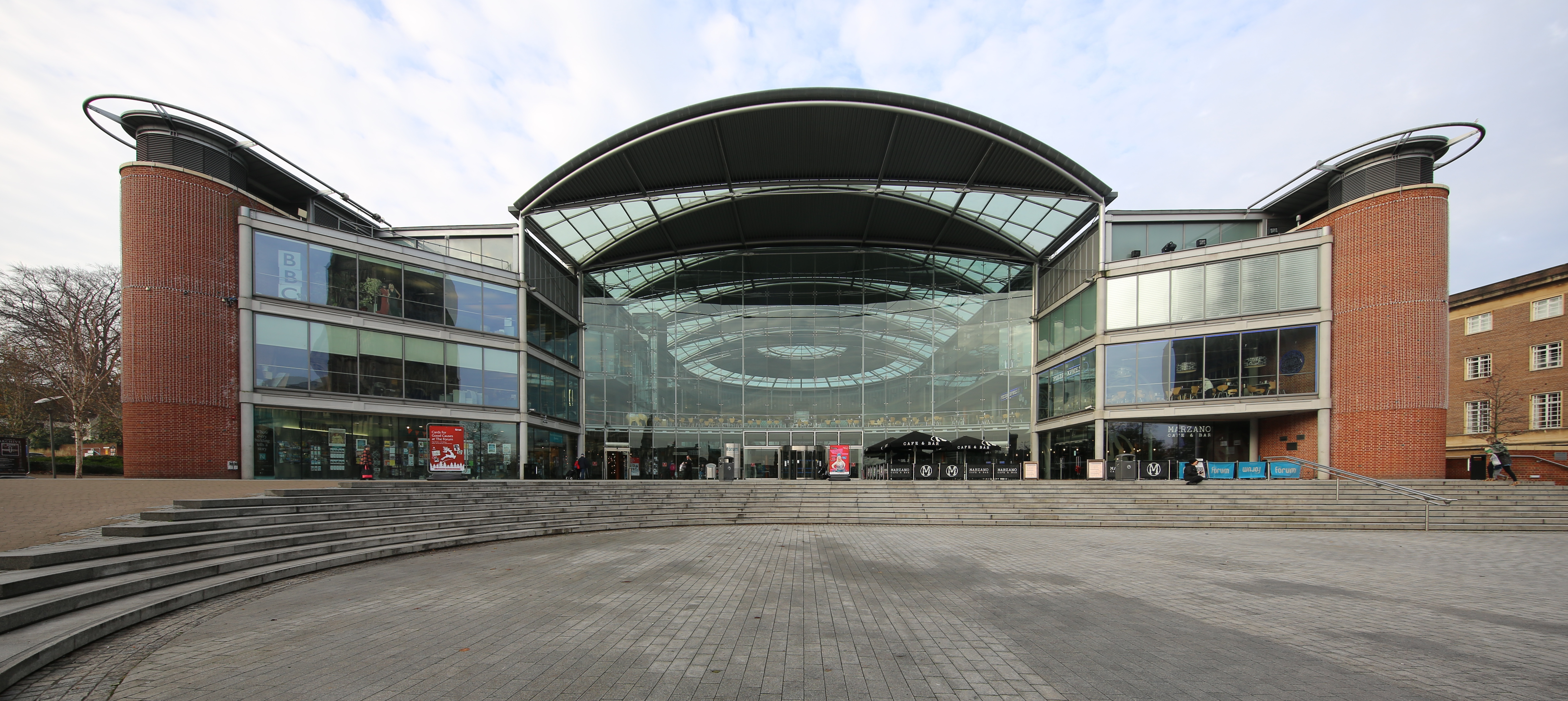
- Interactive map of the The Forum area

General information
- Location: Norwich, England
- Coordinates: 52°37′39″N 1°17′26″E
- Year built: 1999–2001
- Opened: 1 November 2001
- Cost: £66 million (equivalent to £138 million in 2023)

Technical details
- Material: Glass and brick (exterior), steel (frame)
- Floor count: 3

Design and construction
- Architecture firm: Sir Michael Hopkins and Partners

Other information
- Parking: Underground parking

Website
- theforumnorwich.co.uk

The Forum is a public building in Norwich, Norfolk, England. The building opened in 2001 and was designed by the British architectural firm Sir Michael Hopkins and Partners. It was built to serve as a replacement to the Norwich Central Library, which burnt down on the site in 1994.

After a proposal for a site named Technopolis was rejected, a second version, which was named New Technopolis before changing to the Forum, was constructed. The Norfolk and Norwich Millennium Library sits to the west end of the building, with office and commercial spaces and studios for the BBC around a main atrium. The building is fronted by a glass façade with a surrounding brick wall and inner steel frame supporting a glass and zinc panel roof. The project cost £66 million (equivalent to £138 million in 2023), of which £31 million (equivalent to £65 million in 2023) was from the Millennium Commission. The library has been named one of the most popular in the country, while The Forum is a venue for public events and festivals and the outside plain hosts live performances. Despite winning several awards, the building has been criticised for its use of materials and has been likened to a shopping mall and airport terminal.

== Background ==
The Forum sits at the centre of what was from 1075 the French Borough, and prior to this possibly a site of goldworking. Norwich was the first city to adopt the Public Libraries Act 1850, establishing a free public library in 1857.

=== Norwich Central Library ===
In 1937, it was suggested that "more suitable accommodation" was required to meet "immediate requirements", and so Norwich Central Library was commissioned. Designed in the neo-brutalist style by architect David Percival who won the RIBA Bronze medal for its design, it cost £350,000, with £30,000 donated by the United States Air Force 2nd Air Division going towards a room for an American library and to act as a memorial for the lives lost during World War II. Public opinion on the design of the building was mixed. It was opened in January 1963 by the Queen Mother, and became the first major central library to open in the country after World War II.

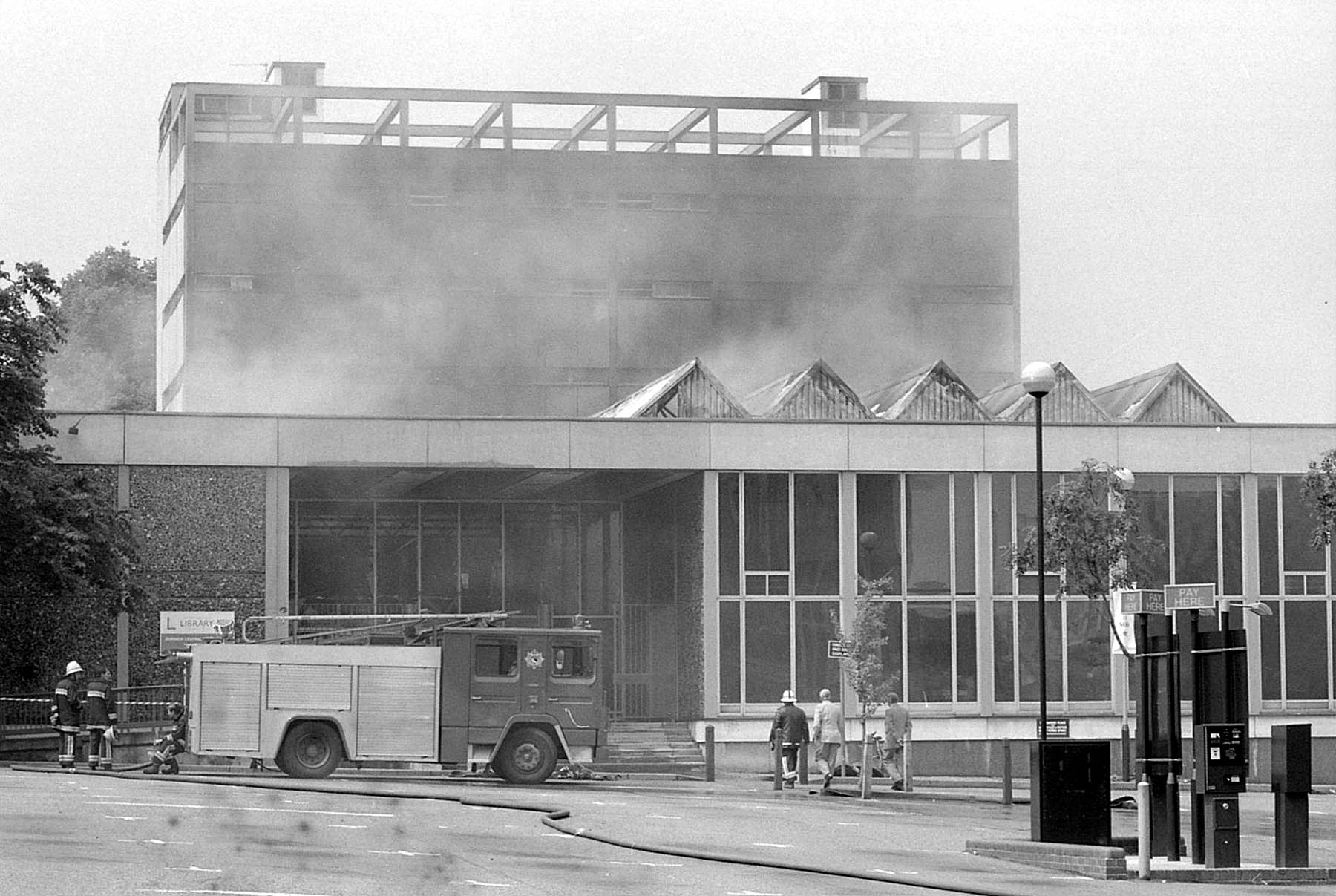
Fire at Norwich Central Library, 1994

On 1 August 1994, at 7:20 a.m., an electrical fault in the American library set fire to a bookshelf. The fire quickly spread; within two minutes, flames were already escaping through the roof and about ten minutes later, the fire had "swept through the first floor". The first fire crews arrived at 7:33 a.m. and 150 firefighters tackled the blaze with Anglian Water increasing the water pressure to assist the firefighters. Jean Kennedy, who had been the City and County Archivist since 1963 and headed the Norfolk Record Office which was based in the basement of the library, reported that firefighters entered the building shortly after 11:30 a.m. with other staff entering later to begin removing surviving records. The record office, which contained between two and three million documents, had withstood the fire, exceeding its expected two hours of fire resistance. Firefighters fought the fire for three days. An initial report claimed that the fire had been caused by a gas explosion and that more than 350,000 books had been lost, but the figure was later reported to be up to 155,000, with 125,000 books lost from the lending and reference department. A figure from the BBC years later put the loss at 170,000 books. Also lost were the American library and its 3,500 books, two-thirds of the Colman collection, which contained 10,000 documents, letters and pamphlets on Norfolk, the 18th-century Rye collection, original collections of cartes de visite, a bank of 35mm negative film, a large part of the local studies photographic archive, early newspapers, orchestral scores and documents relating to Norwich School. About 15,000 Norwich prints were lost in total. The library had to be subsequently demolished due to the damage.

== Planning and construction ==
Following the demolition, research was conducted into the potential location and role of a new library. Several factors were identified, such as a forecasted rise in the number of pensioners, a rise in the number of people entering further and higher education, population growth in the area, and a forecasted rise of 30% in the number of people going to the library. The central library site was owned by Norfolk County Council and Norwich City Council, and the city worked towards putting a bid forward to the Millennium Commission for funding for a project named Technopolis on the site. The project was to cost £79 million (equivalent to £165 million in 2023) and would house the new library, as well as areas of business hire, an entrance and retail area, and a multistorey car park. Paul Finch of Architects' Journal reported that the project "received widespread public opposition - as well as widespread support - and was eventually dropped", however, following a public consultation phase, new plans were put forward for a £66 million project with the building to cost £60 million (equivalent to £125 million in 2023). Named New Technopolis, it would contain, alongside the library, an underground car park, multimedia auditorium, tourist information centre, business and learning centre, ticket shop, catering area, and a public square in front of St Peter Mancroft Church. The project was to be supported by a grant of £31 million from the Millennium Commission and would be undertaken by the Norfolk and Norwich Millennium Bid Company Ltd.

British architectural firm Sir Michael Hopkins and Partners, founded by Sir Michael Hopkins, applied for planning permission for the horseshoe-shaped building in 1998, with the plans backed by the Millennium Commission in May of that year. A major archaeological excavation took place on the site, uncovering parallel ditches dating to before the creation of the French Borough as well as evidence of goldworking. In May 1999, following the granting of planning permission and an archaeological survey, piling and excavation began. The structure consists of a three-storey concrete frame with a surrounding brick wall, with the brickwork made to emulate that of the adjacent City Hall. The zinc panel and glass roof is supported by steel trusses. The eastern end of the building, comprising a 15 m (49 ft)-high glass wall, faces towards Saint Peter Mancroft, while the west, curved end contains the library behind more glass walls. An atrium in the centre is flanked by glazed offices and a Pizza Express restaurant. The construction of the building took more than 1,500 lorry loads of concrete and nearly half a million bricks. $3 million (equivalent to £5 million in 2023) was raised primarily by the Second Air Division Association towards the construction of a new American library, which contained over 4,000 books and 30,000 photographs, letters, memoirs, and other documents following a refurbishment in 2020.

== Recent history ==
Construction was completed in October 2001 and the building was opened on 1 November. Despite the names of Technopolis and New Technopolis being used in the planning phase, the finished building was called The Forum. The American library was dedicated on 6 November and the ceremony, which was attended by 2nd Air Division veterans, included a service from the Bishop of Norwich and a 28-piece orchestra. As part of her tour celebrating her Golden Jubilee, Queen Elizabeth II visited Norfolk on 18 July 2002 and officially opened The Forum. In 2003, a number of regional BBC services – Radio Norfolk, Look East, Politics Show, Inside Out, the online news service and Ceefax – moved to The Forum from their previous locations at Norfolk Tower and St Catherine's Close. Technology for the services was specially commissioned for the studio, which overlooks the central area of the building.

In 2003, The Forum received the Urban Design Reward from the Civic Trust Awards and the RIBA regional award in the east in 2004. A visitor attraction called Origins spanned three floors in the building and allowed visitors to learn about the history of Norfolk and Norwich and contained interactive screens worth £2.5 million, but this was later replaced by a new visitor centre, television studio, and a 100-seat auditorium following financial losses. The Forum was part of the Norwich 12, an initiative by the Norwich Heritage Economic and Regeneration Trust (HEART) to develop 12 landmarks in Norwich into heritage attractions. The Forum has also hosted concerts, events and festivals, such as the city's Dragon Festival; the 2021 Feastival, a produce and food event; and the Norwich Science Festival. The area in front of the building, known as Millennium Plain, is used for public events, performances, live music, festivals and exhibitions.

== Reception ==
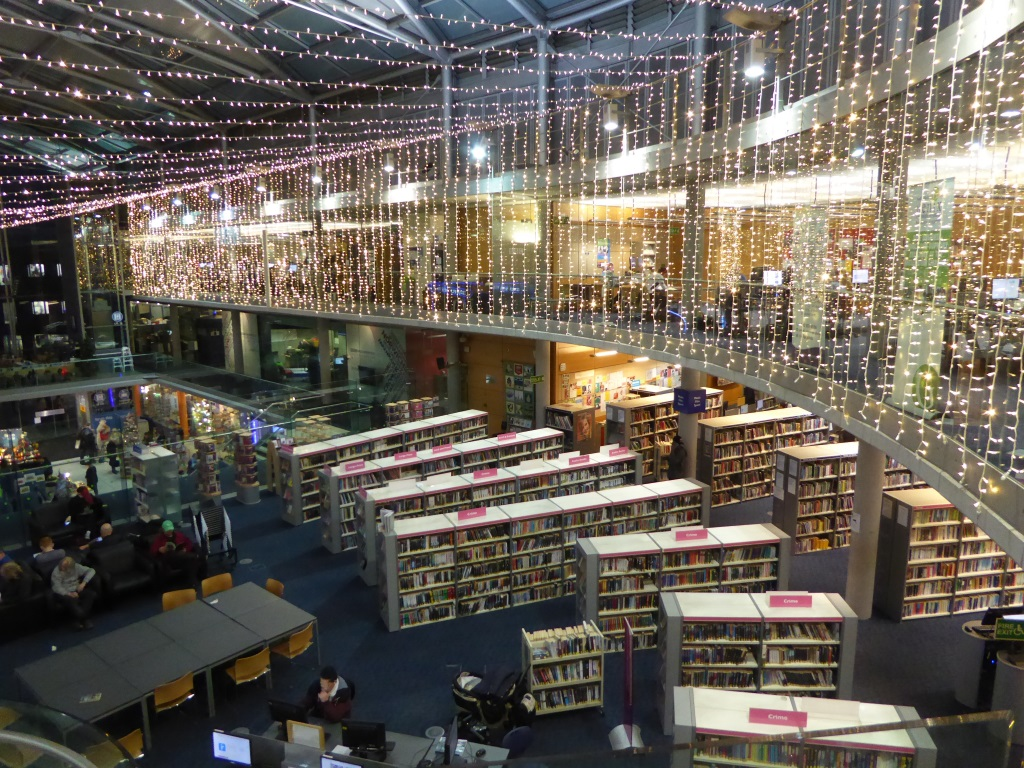
Interior of Norwich Millennium Library, 2016

In 2013, The Millennium Library was the most popular library in the UK for the seventh year running, receiving 1,273,416 visits. Jennifer Holland, head of Norfolk Libraries, credited the library with having "well-maintained book stocks" and an ability to "stay relevant". Queen Elizabeth II also praised the building during the opening ceremony, while RIBA described it as an "architectural tour de force and major contribution to urban cultural and social life in Norwich." Jonathan Glancey, who visited The Forum four weeks after its opening, described it as a "heroic if ultimately flawed attempt to create a dignified public meeting place to satisfy complex and contradictory needs and desires". He described it as resembling an airport terminal and suggested that the library should be housed separately to the commercial area of the building, pointing out the Pizza Express as an example. He was also confused with the "glass walls and hi-tech trickery" contrast with the "salty red" brick walls which resemble a "modern bullring or an over-restored Roman amphitheatre". Giles Worsley, writing for The Daily Telegraph, said that

[s]ometimes Hopkin's combination of very different materials can lead to unexpected results. The mixture of heavy concrete beams, glass, steel and laminated wood struts in the central hall of Portcullis House... may have driven more purist Modernists into a frenzy of agitation but it is a bold and memorable space in stature with time. By contrast, the Forum is no more than a variant on a shopping mall. Although shopping malls are an increasingly dominant building type, it seems sad that with more than £63 million to play with, an architect of Hopkin's skill could not have come up with something more distinctive. Hopkins seems to have hobbled from the start by that simplistic equation of glass with access.
