= BBC Radio Cambridgeshire =

Coordinates: 52.2299°N 0.1503°E

Cambridge; England
- Broadcast area: Cambridgeshire
- Frequencies: FM: 95.7 MHz (Peterborough); FM: 96.0 MHz (Cambridge and Ely); DAB: 11C (Cambridge); DAB: 12D (Peterborough); Freeview: 714
- RDS: BBC CAMB

Programming
- Language: English
- Format: Local news, talk and music

Ownership
- Owner: BBC Local Radio, BBC East

History
- First air date: 1 May 1982
- Former frequencies: 1026 MW

Technical information
- Licensing authority: Ofcom

Links
- Website: www.bbc.co.uk/radiocambridgeshire

BBC Radio Cambridgeshire is the BBC's local radio station serving the county of Cambridgeshire.

It broadcasts on FM, DAB, digital TV and via BBC Sounds from studios at the Cambridge Business Park on Cowley Road in Cambridge. The station also aired on MW, but stopped broadcasting on medium wave on 10 May 2021.

According to RAJAR, the station has a weekly audience of 73,000 listeners as of May 2025.

== Early history ==
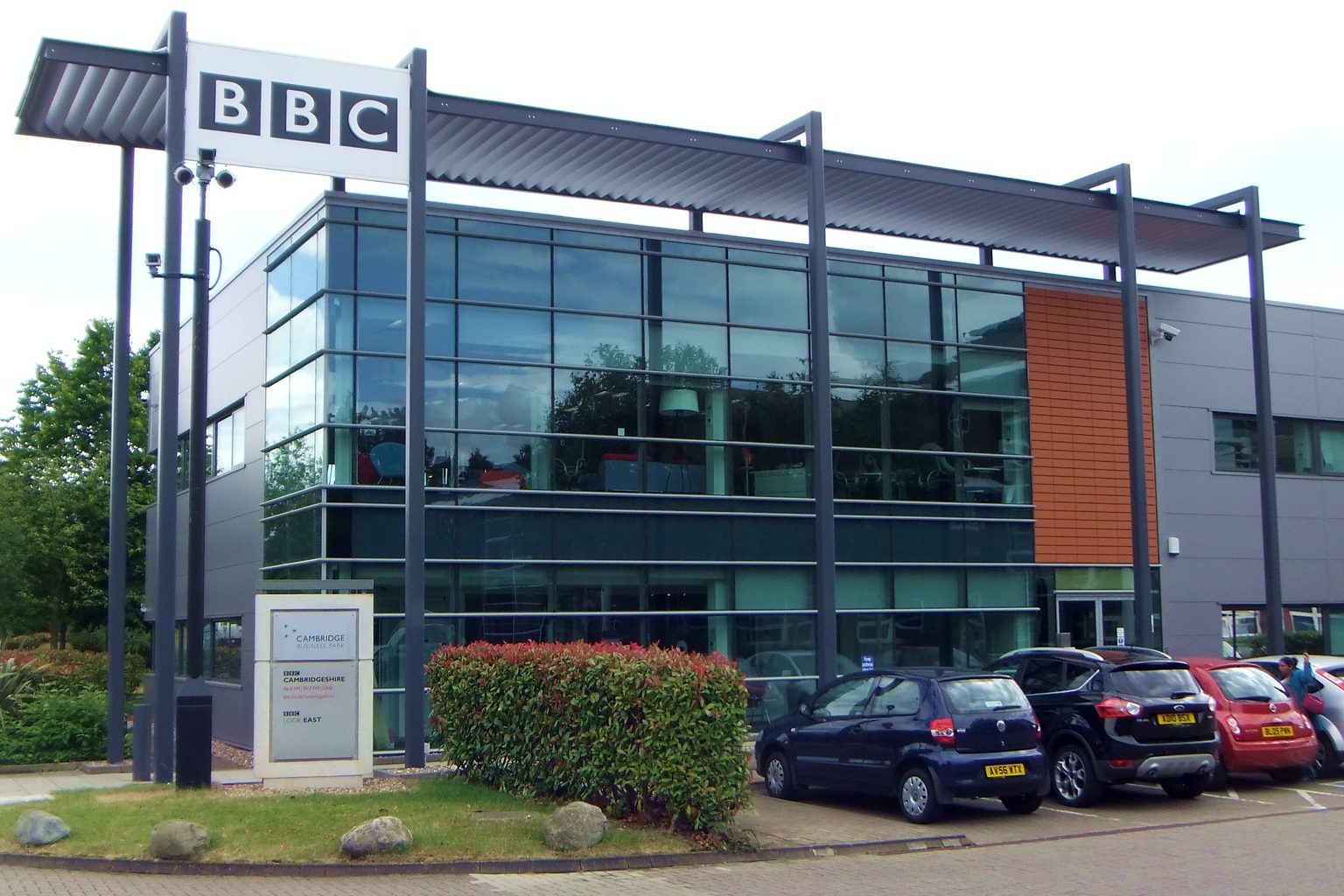
BBC Cambridgeshire building at Cambridge Business Park.

Radio Cambridgeshire began broadcasting on 1 May 1982. It was originally based at studios on Hills Road, close to Cambridge railway station. An opt-out service for Peterborough and North Cambs existed at times and was called BBC Radio Peterborough and BBC Peterborough FM.

The opening day was broadcast from Cambridge and all the district offices at Peterborough, Wisbech, March, Huntingdon and Ely.

The original weekday presenters were:

- Julian Dunne (New Day, an all-speech news service that ran at the same hours as Today on BBC Radio 4, on which it was based)
- Anne Bristow and Jane Solomons, alternating (The Light Programme, a mixture of music and light interviews)
- Gina Madgett (The Home Service, a largely speech programme with interviews intended to interest listeners at home)

Under the first manager, Hal Bethell, Radio Cambridgeshire's early broadcasts were restricted to a few hours at breakfast and two hours in the afternoon. but Hal Bethell left the station for health reasons, he was replaced by the deputy manager of Radio Lincolnshire, Dave Wilkinson. He extended broadcasting into the afternoon by hiring Radio Lincolnshire presenter, John Richards. Wilkinson returned to Radio Lincolnshire as manager and was replaced by Ian Masters, ex-presenter of BBC East's regional TV news programme, Look East.

== Peterborough studios ==
The former Peterborough studio opened in a single office in Broadway Court, rented from Peterborough Development Corporation, the body responsible for the city's expansion as a new town. The broadcasting equipment was two Studer tape recorders, a four-channel mixer and two microphones, which were placed on a table surrounded by mobile sound baffles. Ian Cameron, the first Peterborough-based presenter, realised at the last moment that the wall behind the temporary studio abutted the office block's lavatories and asked the staff in Cambridge to listen while he flushed the cistern. Nothing could be heard and the broadcast went ahead without fear of others in the office block inadvertently disturbing it.

In 1983, Peterborough was equipped with its own studio, using a 12-channel Audix mixing desk made in the county and two Studer B67 tape machines, with a third machine for editing in a neighbouring office. That office later become a studio as well, although it could go on the air only from the main studio alongside. The first complete programme from Peterborough was presented by Julia Booth (formerly of BBC Radio London) while the studio's opening party was going on on the floor below.

In 1987, the studio gained the ability to broadcast localised opt-outs. At first, the opt-out was used only for traffic information in the morning news programme and, later in the day, for five-minute spots of purely local information. The first full opt-out programme from Peterborough was presented by Les Woodland in the afternoon while John Richards broadcast from Cambridge. Steve Somers presented the BBC Radio Peterborough daily Breakfast show. Production assistant for the opt-in station was Darren Deans. The next programme to opt out was Sounds Eastern, two hours of music and commentary aimed at Peterborough's Indian, Pakistani, Sikh and Bengali population and presented by Ansar Ali. The Peterborough Breakfast show opt out was abandoned in 2012 due to BBC cutbacks, and presenter Paul Stainton took over presenting duties of the countywide breakfast show, then the mid-morning show following Andy Harper's retirement in 2014, before leaving the station in September 2017.

== Outside broadcasts ==
The station's first outside broadcasts were of results from local elections held soon after the station went on the air. The station's radio car was used from the back doors of the town hall in Peterborough. The reporter was Ian Cameron. The first complete programme broadcast away from the studio was the same year, from the East of England Show in Peterborough, presented by Anne Bristow.

== Symbol ==
The first station badge or symbol was a design suggesting Cambridgeshire's three main rivers, the Nene, the Ouse and the Cam. Before the station came on the air, the manager, Hal Bethell, arranged with the Pye radio company, which had long been associated with Cambridge, to use a design based on the sun-through-clouds design which Pye previously cut into the loudspeaker screens of its original radios.

The sun-and-clouds symbol remained until a BBC ruling that all its stations should have a joint logo to underline the national nature of the local service.

== Programming ==
Local programming is produced and broadcast from the BBC's Cambridge studios from 6 am to 2 pm on weekdays with all other programming since 2023, apart from sports coverage, being regional or national.

During the station's downtime, BBC Radio Cambridgeshire simulcasts overnight programming from BBC Radio 5 Live.

== Presenters ==
=== Notable former presenters ===
- Matthew Amroliwala
- Chris Morris
- Dr Chris Smith
- Richard Spendlove
