= Greater Norwich =

- Proposed unitary authority area
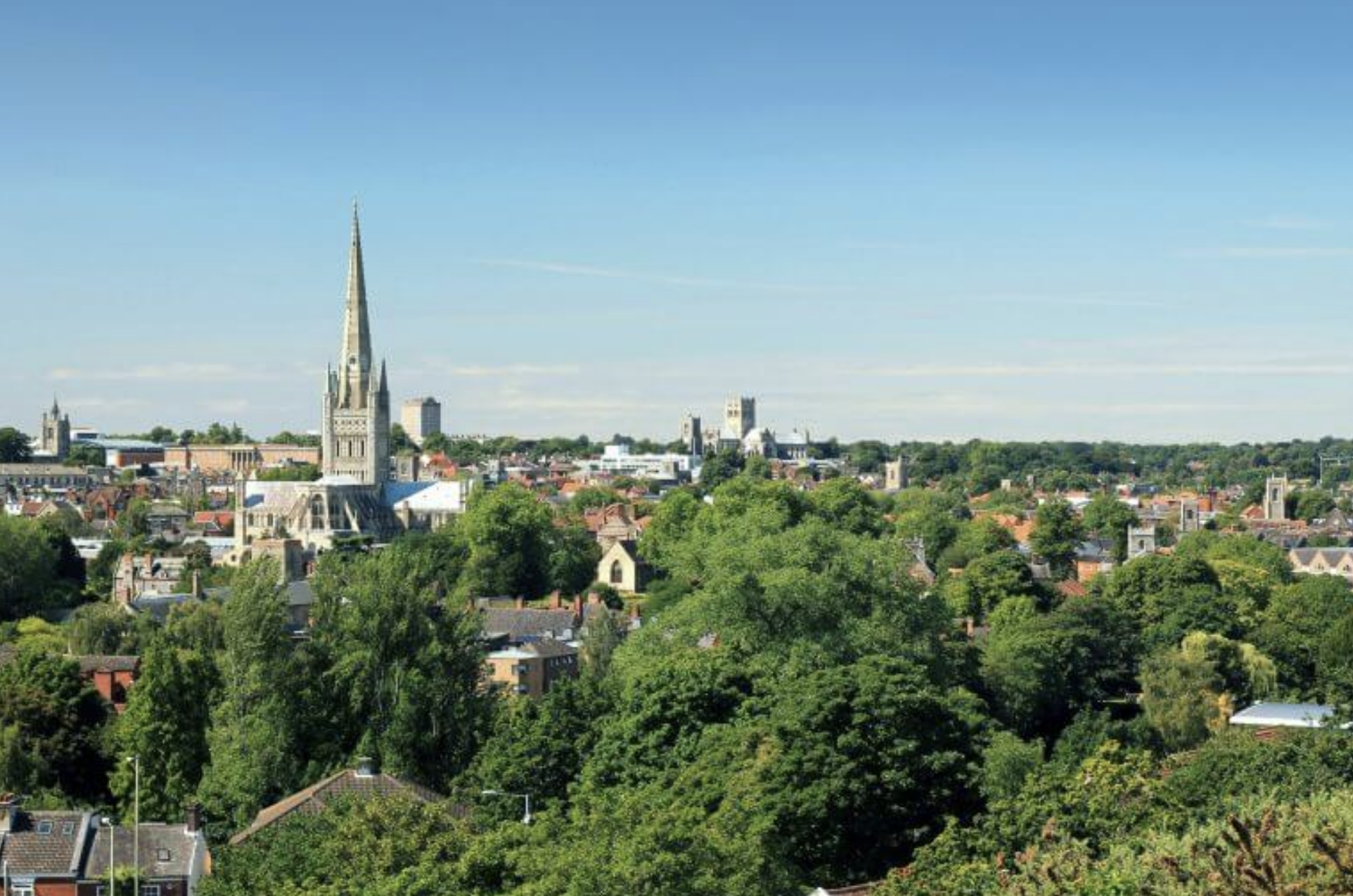
- Norwich city skyline

- Greater Norwich shown within Norfolk
- Interactive map
- Coordinates: 52.6282°N 1.2912°E
- Sovereign state: United Kingdom
- Country: England
- Region: East
- Ceremonial county: Norfolk

Government
  - Type: Unitary authority
  - Body: Greater Norwich City Council

Population (2024 estimate)
  - Total: 289,666
- Time zone: UTC+0 (GMT)
  - Summer (DST): UTC+1 (BST)

Greater Norwich was a proposed unitary authority in Norfolk, England. It would have been be formed from the City of Norwich, 19 parishes from Broadland and 16 parishes from South Norfolk. It would have been centred on Norwich, which would be its largest settlement. It would have included the outlying towns of Costessey, Sprowston and Thorpe St Andrew. It would have bordered the other proposed districts in the county, West Norfolk to the west and East Norfolk to the east. The area has a population of 278,285. Plans to create it were withdrawn in September 2026.

== Timeline ==
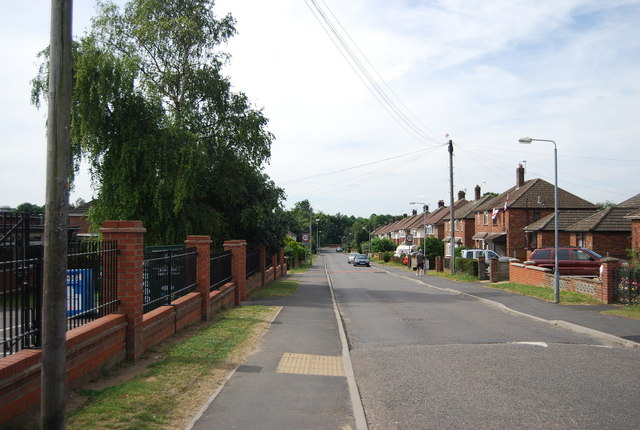
Costessey, one of the three towns of Greater Norwich

The unitary authority area was proposed as part of upcoming structural changes to local government in England. The government did not accept the alternative proposals of a single unitary authority and a two unitary authorities for Norfolk.

The unitary council, Greater Norwich City Council, would have taken over the powers of the three district councils and Norfolk County Council in the area. There would have been elections in May 2027, and the new unitary would have been created in 2028.

In September 2026, the Norfolk proposals were withdrawn by the government in light of new government advice. The 2027 election was cancelled.

== Parishes ==
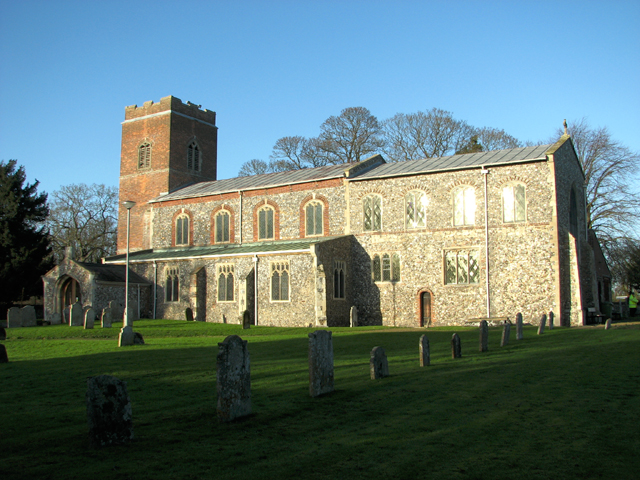
Sprowston, one of the three towns of Greater Norwich

The current district of Norwich is unparished, while the rest of the proposed district is parished.

The only parishes with established town councils in the area are Costessey, Sprowston and Thorpe St Andrew.

The parishes which were planned to become part of the Greater Norwich City Council area would have been from parts of the current Broadland and South Norfolk districts.

== Opposition ==
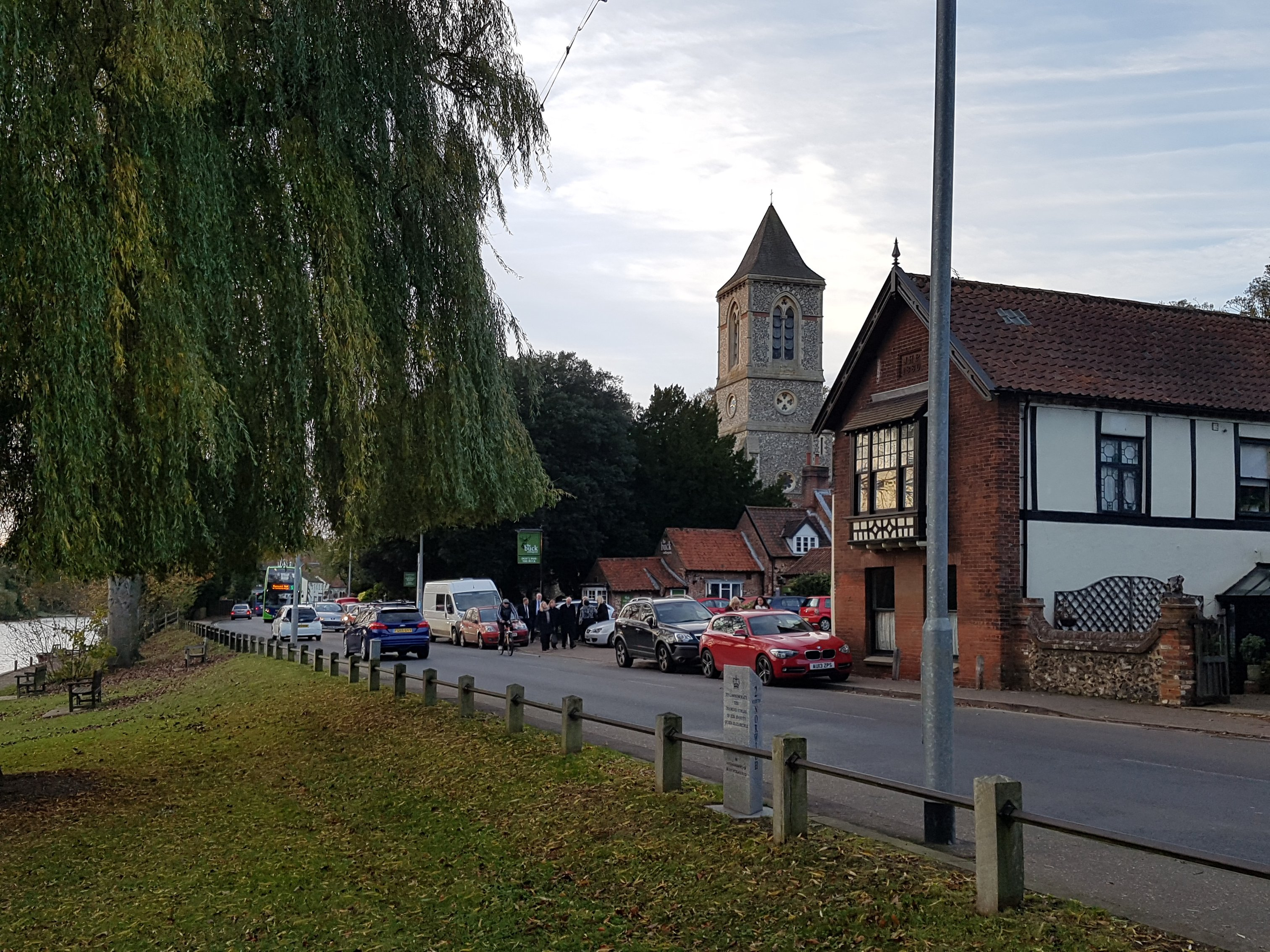
Thorpe St Andrew, one of the three towns of Greater Norwich

The proposal for the new unitary area has been met with fierce opposition by local residents in the surrounding parishes planned to become part of the unitary area. Notable villages opposing this include Honingham, Horsford and Poringland, whose residents do not want to be seen as "city folk" or have the issues around crime, poverty, housing and developments forced on them by Norwich.

South Norfolk District Council has also launched a £250,000 judicial review against the planned reorganisation of local governments by the current Labour Party Government. The council leader said the rural areas of the unitary area would likely treated as "second tier citizens" and would see distinct towns and villages become "submerged into a city-dominated area".

Additionally, the Reform UK-led Norfolk County Council is also seeking legal challenges over the planned unitary areas.

== Support ==
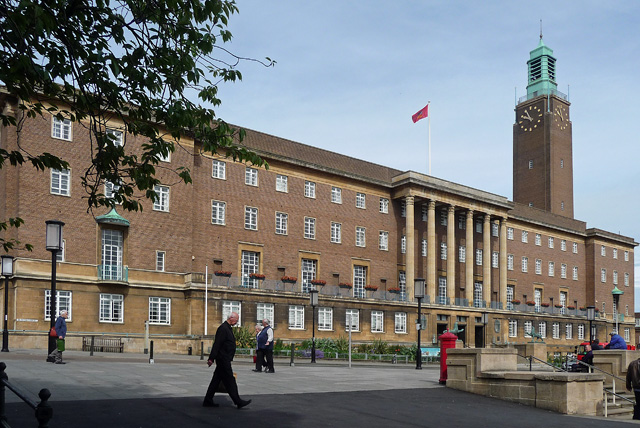
City Hall in Norwich, the current meeting place of Norwich City Council.

Support for Greater Norwich has been backed by the UK Government, Norwich City Council and the Future Norfolk Partnership. According to Norwich City Council, the reasons behind supporting the unitary area is to allow the city council to break away from the county council and to expand the city's influence into its surrounding urban area. This would be achieved through a new tax base and wider geographic footprint, which is currently limited by the current district of Norwich.

The city also has supported the break away from the county council due to being constrained by the decisions made by it and having no control over Norwich's economy. An attempt to become a unitary authority was made in 2007, and was almost approved in 2010 by then-Local Government Minster Rosie Winterton. However, the proposal was then postponed due to the 2010 United Kingdom general election. The proposal was then rejected by the then-new Local Government Minster Eric Pickles.

The view of the city council is that support for the unitary area of Greater Norwich City Council and Greater Norwich would allow the city to control its own investments, developments, education, public services, council tax and a wider geographic footprint for housing, industry and retail.

The proposal was supported by the Starmer ministry, who believed the proposed unitary area is a "primary economic driver in the East of England" and is seen as a fast-growing region in life sciences and tech. Also seen to be a strong delivery of major housing targets and tackling local socio-economic inequalities.

== New garden villages and towns ==
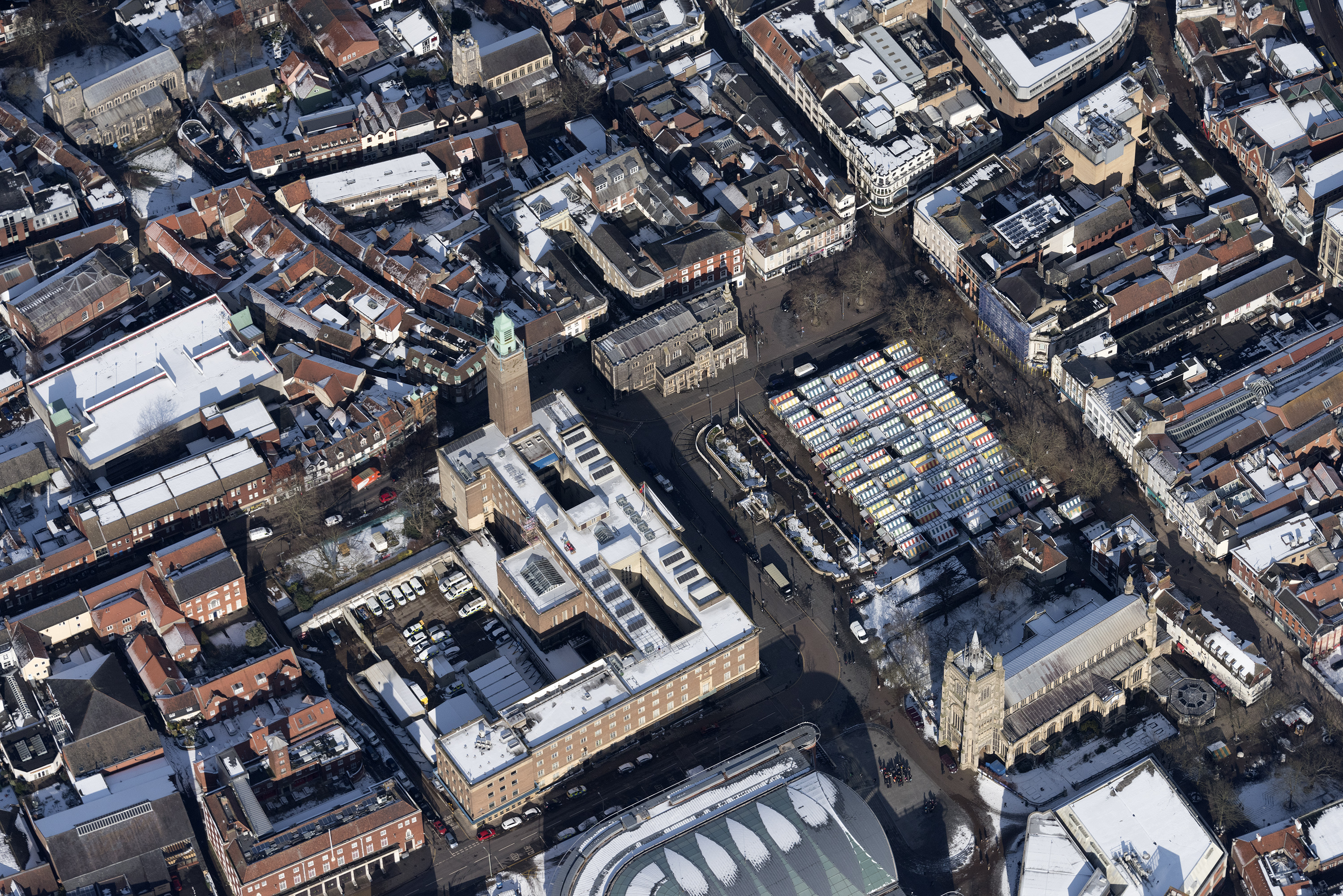
Aerial of Norwich City Centre

Greater Norwich is also planned to become home to many "garden villages" and urban expansions, which is hoped to meet both national and local housing targets set by the Starmer ministry. Currently the proposed housing target for Greater Norwich is set to be 2,600 homes annually, with the number of houses built over the next two decades being set at 50,000 homes.

Additionally, planned urban expansions are proposed to surrounding towns and villages including Rackheath and the "Growth Triangle" which includes Old Catton, Rackheath, Sprowston and Thorpe St Andrew.

== Settlements ==
The following civil parishes, towns and villages would have become part of Greater Norwich:

- Bawburgh
- Beeston St Andrew
- Bixley
- Blofield
- Brundall
- Caistor St Edmund
- Colney
- Costessey (Town)
- Cringleford
- Drayton
- Easton
- Framingham Earl
- Framingham Pigot
- Great and Little Plumstead
- Great Melton
- Hellesdon
- Hemblington
- Hethersett
- Honingham
- Horsford
- Horsham St Faith and Newton St Faith
- Intwood
- Keswick
- Kirby Bedon
- Little Melton
- Marlingford and Colton
- New Costessey
- Old Catton
- Poringland
- Postwick
- Rackheath
- Ringland
- Salhouse
- Spixworth
- Sprowston (Town)
- Taverham
- Thorpe Marriott
- Thorpe St Andrew (Town)
- Trowse Newton

The unparished areas are: Bowthorpe, Catton Grove, Crome, Eaton, Lakenham, Mancroft, Mile Cross, Nelson, Sewell, Thorpe Hamlet, Town Close, University and Wensum. These are all districts and suburbs of Norwich.

== Transportation ==
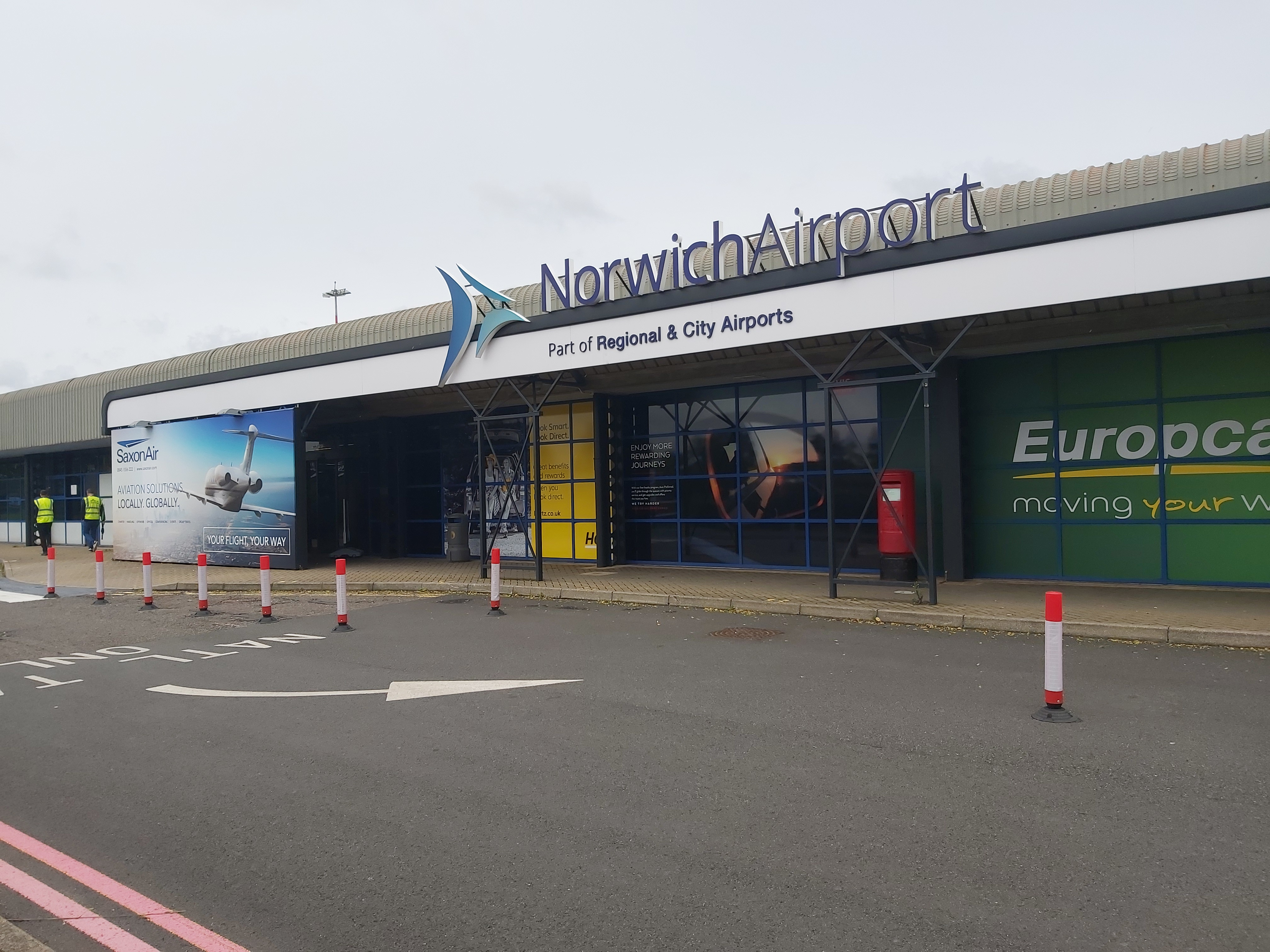
Norwich Airport

The Greater Norwich area is well connected by major trunk and local roads such as the A47 (Norwich Southern Bypass), A146 (London Road), Norwich Northern Distributor Road, Broadland Northway, A1151, and A140. Some new roads are currently proposed or under construction around the Greater Norwich urban area which include the A47/A11 Thickthorn Junction, the Long Stratton Bypass and the Norwich Western Link.

Norwich Airport is the main international airport for the area.

Railway stations in the area include: Brundall, Brundall Gardens, Buckenham, Hoveton & Wroxham, Lingwood, Norwich and Salhouse.

Disused and former railway stations in the area are: Drayton, Hellesdon, Hethersett, Norwich City, Norwich Victoria, Spinks Lane, Surlington Ferry, Trowse and Whitlingham.

== Notable landmarks ==
The area is home to many historical landmarks and sites of interest. These include:

- Assembly House
- Bethel Hospital
- Catton Park
- City Hall
- City of Norwich Aviation Museum
- Costessey Hall
- County Hall
- Cow Tower
- Dragon Hall
- Eaton Park Miniature Railway
- Hellesdon railway station remains
- Marriott's Way
- Mousehold Heath
- Norwich Arts Centre
- Norwich Castle
- Norwich Cathedral
- Norwich Cinema City
- Norwich City railway station remains
- Norwich City Walls
- Norwich Guildhall
- Norwich Market
- Norwich War Memorial
- Octagon Chapel
- Royal Arcade
- Sainsbury Centre for Visual Arts
- St Andrew's and Blackfriars' Hall
- St James Mill
- St John the Baptist Cathedral
- St John de Sepulchre (The Flint Rooms)
- St Peter Mancroft
- Strangers' Hall
- Surrey House
