= Suffolk Youth Orchestra =

The Suffolk Youth Orchestra (SYO) is a symphony orchestra of over 90 players aged between 13 and 21 years. It is part of Suffolk County Council's programme of youth music.

The orchestra gives annual performances at the Snape Proms. It provided the orchestral accompaniment for the National Youth Music Theatre's tour of Creation. SYO was one of seven British youth orchestras selected to participate in the Masterprize Dearfield Education Programme, part of Masterprize 2001.

The orchestra performed a 'Prom in the Park' in the Abbey Gardens, Bury St. Edmunds, in the presence of the Queen and Prince Philip on the occasion of the Royal Golden Jubilee visit to Suffolk, and performed Saint-Saëns' 'Organ' Symphony at a concert attended by the Princess Royal at St. Edmundsbury Cathedral in celebration of the completion of the new cathedral tower.

In December 2007, the orchestra led the musical proceedings at BBC Radio Suffolk's Children in Need Carol Concert in Snape Maltings Concert Hall, broadcast across the region on Christmas Day.

Every summer, the orchestra goes on a week-long tour to continental Europe. Locations have included Poland, including a concert at Oświęcim (Auschwitz); Prague; Barcelona and the Costa Dorada, Spain; Strasbourg; Tuscany, Italy; the Castile and León region of Spain; Hungary, Eastern Germany, the Netherlands, Czech Republic, Slovakia and Belgium.

It provided the orchestra for two Benjamin Britten's War Requiem performances in April 2013. It took part in the 100 performances of the Battle of the Somme by Laura Rossi in April 2017.

== See also ==
- List of youth orchestras
