= Roy Waller =

English football commentator (1940–2010)

Roy Waller (17 September 1940 – 6 July 2010) was a regular radio presenter on BBC Radio Norfolk and was the main football match commentator for the station until 2007. He died in the Norfolk and Norwich University Hospital on 6 July 2010, after battling with liver illness. Waller's funeral service took place at Norwich Cathedral on 23 July 2010. Known as "the voice of Carrow Road", in September 2010, a commentary box at Carrow Road was dedicated to Waller's memory, and was unveiled by Alan Bowkett and Waller's widow, Sylvie, before a home game and to the applause of the fans.

== Personal life ==
Roy was known for being a diehard Norwich City fan. His deep Norfolk accent was often the subject of light-hearted criticism from other football fans but he was popular among other football fans in Norwich. In March 2008, Waller was made Sheriff of Norwich. His popularity even led to him once being gunged by Noel Edmonds on Noel's House Party in the 1990s.

== Weekday Show ==
Waller presented a daily show with BBC Radio Norfolk from the early 1980s until 2009. Roy Waller's last weekday show aired Monday to Fridays from 1 pm to 4 pm. The theme was an entertainment show featuring guests and fun "with music thrown in". Features included "The Alternative News", "Roy's Phonebook Challenge", "War of the Work Force" and Norfolk drama Little Bexham. The show regularly took calls and texts from the listeners. He stepped down from presenting his daily show on 19 September 2009 to focus on Rodeo Norfolk. His show was succeeded by Stephen Bumfrey who moved to the slot after presenting the breakfast show.

== Little Bexham ==
Similar to BBC Radio 4's The Archers, Little Bexham was a sixteen-part drama from BBC Radio Norfolk. It was created by Norfolk author Sue Welfare with the help of Waller and former producer Amy Barratt. The first series aired in Autumn 2007 on Waller's afternoon show, with an omnibus at the weekend.

== Rodeo Norfolk ==
Despite finishing his daily show with Radio Norfolk in September 2009, Waller continued to present Rodeo Norfolk on the station. The programme was a specialist music show focusing on the best in country music. The show also included special requests. It aired every Saturday between 9 am and 12 noon.
