= BBC East =

English region of the BBC

- BBC East's area within the UK
- TV stations: BBC One
- TV transmitters: Sandy Heath; Sudbury; Tacolneston
- Radio stations: BBC Radio Norfolk; BBC Radio Suffolk; BBC Essex; BBC Radio Cambridgeshire; BBC Radio Northampton; BBC Three Counties Radio
- Headquarters: The Forum, Millennium Plain, Norwich, NR2 1BH, (Since 2003)
- Area: Norfolk; Suffolk; Essex; Cambridgeshire; Northamptonshire; Bedfordshire; North Hertfordshire parts of Buckinghamshire (Milton Keynes)
- Nation: BBC English Regions
- Regions: East and parts of the East Midlands
- Key people: Mick Rawsthorne (Head of Regional & Local Programmes)
- Launch date: 1956

BBC East is one of BBC's English Regions covering Norfolk, Suffolk, Essex, Cambridgeshire, Northamptonshire, Bedfordshire and parts of Hertfordshire and Buckinghamshire (including the City of Milton Keynes). It is headquartered in The Forum, Norwich since 2003. It was also separated into two areas, one with the East area covering mostly in Norfolk, Suffolk & Essex, and another from the West area which covers from Cambridge, serving mostly Cambridgeshire, Northamptonshire and the three counties.

== Services ==
=== Television ===
BBC East's television output (broadcast on BBC One) consists of its flagship regional news service BBC Look East, as well as a 30-minute Sunday morning politics programme.

Former programmes include Weekend, East on Two, Matter of Fact and the football magazine show Late Kick Off (produced by the independent production company Kevin Piper Media).

=== Radio ===
The region is the controlling centre for BBC Radio Norfolk, BBC Radio Suffolk, BBC Essex, BBC Radio Cambridgeshire, BBC Radio Northampton and BBC Three Counties Radio.

On weekdays, all six stations open transmission at 4 am with a shared regional early morning show before carrying local programming between 6 am and 10 pm. There is also a shared regional programme broadcast across the stations from 10 pm to 1 am on weeknights, except for BBC Essex who has a stand-alone schedule, and other shared programmes at weekends.

=== Online and Interactive ===
BBC East also produces regional news and local radio pages for BBC Red Button and the BBC Local News websites for each county.

== History ==
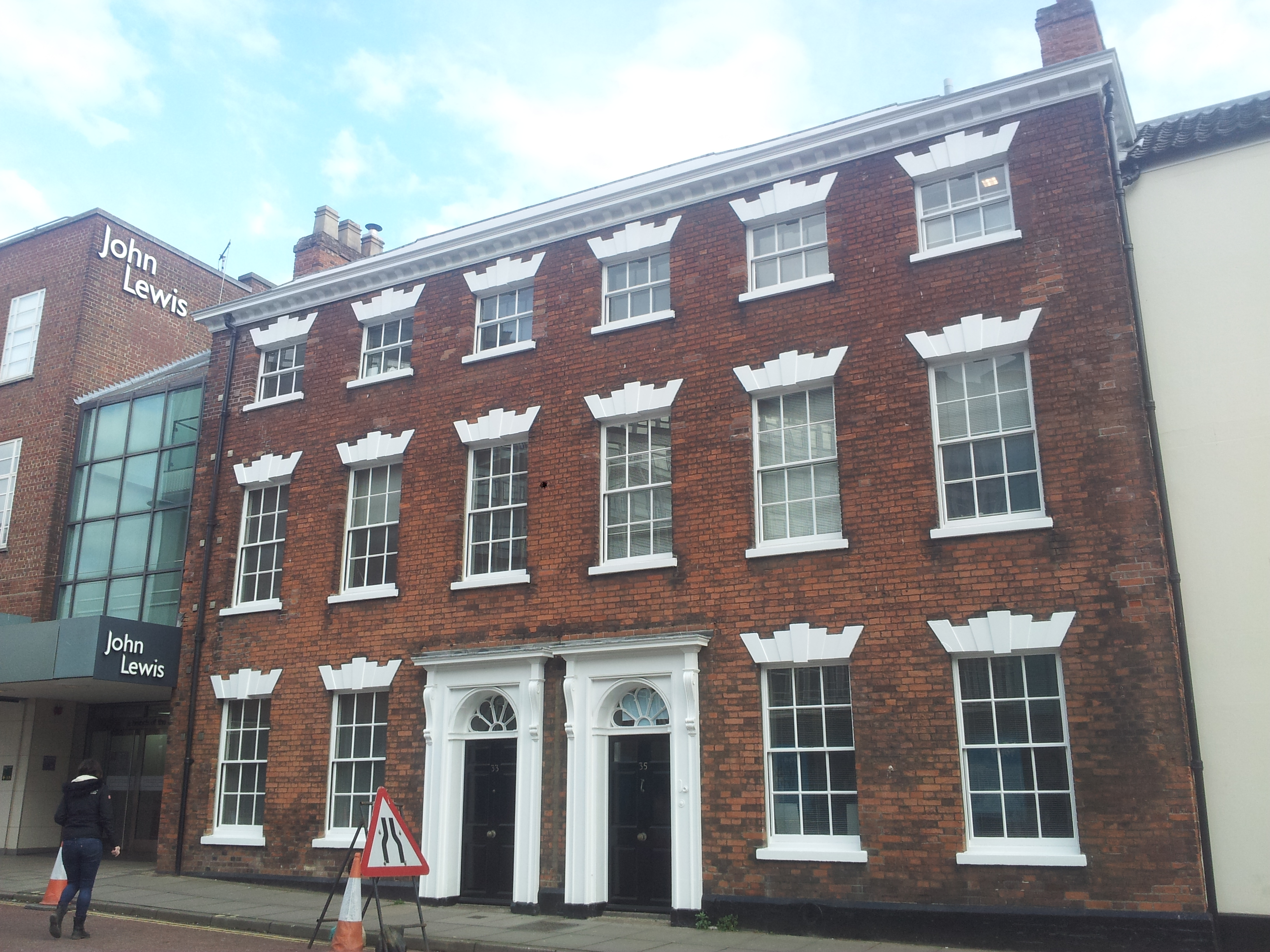
33-35 All Saints Green, Norwich, pictured in 2017. No. 35 was the BBC's base in the city until September 1956.

In the mid-1950s, the BBC had a temporary headquarters in Norwich at No. 35 All Saints Green. In September 1956 they moved to a new, larger headquarters at the nearby St Catherine's Close. From here, editions of radio programmes such as Midlands Miscellany were broadcast into the Midlands Home Service before the end of 1956.

The opening of the Tacolneston transmitting station enabled programmes to be broadcast from Norwich purely for East Anglia on the VHF edition of the Home Service, and regular broadcasts from St Catherine's Close began on Tuesday 5 February 1957. Daily news bulletins for East Anglia began on Monday 10 March 1958, on VHF from the Norwich studios, under the supervision of Richard Robinson.

The launch of regional BBC television news in September 1957 initially saw East Anglia being covered by the service for London and the South East, but in June 1959, with the forthcoming launch of Anglia Television in mind, the Corporation gave the go-ahead to create a TV operation in Norwich with the purpose of transmitting a bespoke ten-minute news bulletin for the region each weekday. The BBC's general policy was to ensure a regional TV news service was launched ahead of the regional ITV franchise.

The first TV news bulletin for the east from St Catherine's Close was broadcast at 6.05pm on 5 October 1959, nearly four weeks ahead of the launch of Anglia. In September 1962, the programme was extended to 20 minutes in length and renamed East Anglia at Six, before becoming East at Six Ten due to a timeslot change the following year. In September 1964, another change of timeslot saw it become Look East, a title the programme still goes under today.

The Norwich-based operation was initially a satellite of the larger BBC Midland region, based in Birmingham. East Anglia was given greater autonomy within the BBC in 1969 after the Broadcasting in the Seventies report recommended the large Midlands and East Anglia region should be split into two, enabling the region to produce and broadcast more of its own regional programming.

During 1997, an opt-out service (originally titled Close Up) was introduced to provide local bulletins for Northamptonshire, Bedfordshire, Cambridgeshire, Hertfordshire, Peterborough and Milton Keynes. This service provided separate teatime and late bulletins Monday to Friday in an area referred to on EPGs as BBC East (West) rather than BBC East (East) which is the sub-region for Norfolk, Suffolk and Essex. The last of these bulletins was broadcast on Friday 16 December 2022, as a result of the BBC restructuring of regional programming leading to budget cutbacks.

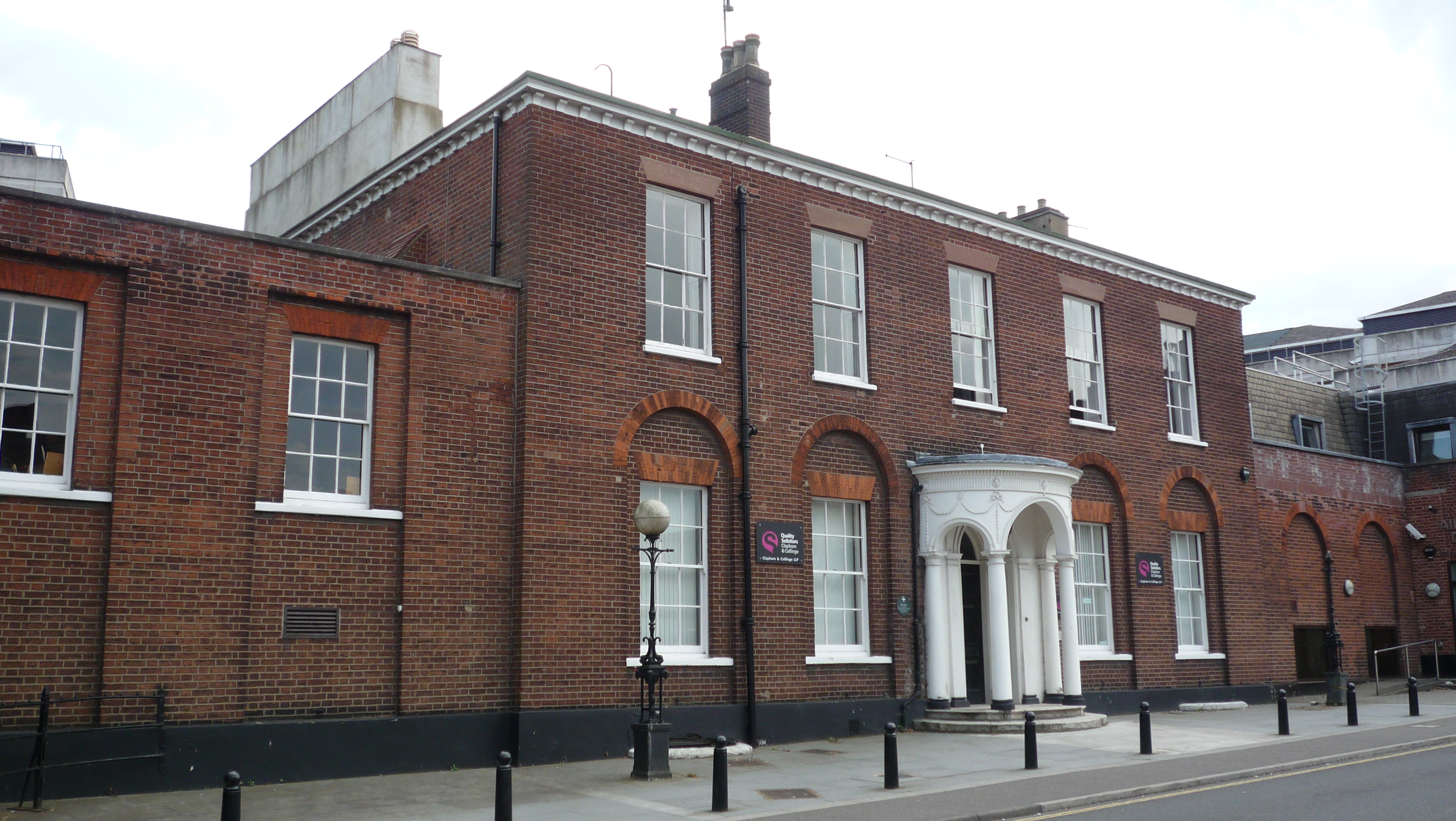
St Catherine's House on All Saints Green in Norwich, pictured in 2012. This was the main base for BBC East's radio operations from 1956 until 1980, and its television output from 1959 to 2003.

Until 1980, regional radio programming was provided by an East Anglia opt-out on BBC Radio 4, consisting largely of daytime news bulletins and a weekday breakfast show, Roundabout East Anglia. The first BBC Local Radio station in the region, Radio Norfolk, was opened on 11 September 1980 and followed by the rollout of stations in Cambridgeshire (1 May 1982), Northamptonshire (16 June 1982), the Three Counties of Bedfordshire, Hertfordshire & Buckinghamshire (24 June 1985), Essex (5 November 1986) and Suffolk (12 April 1990).

== Studios ==
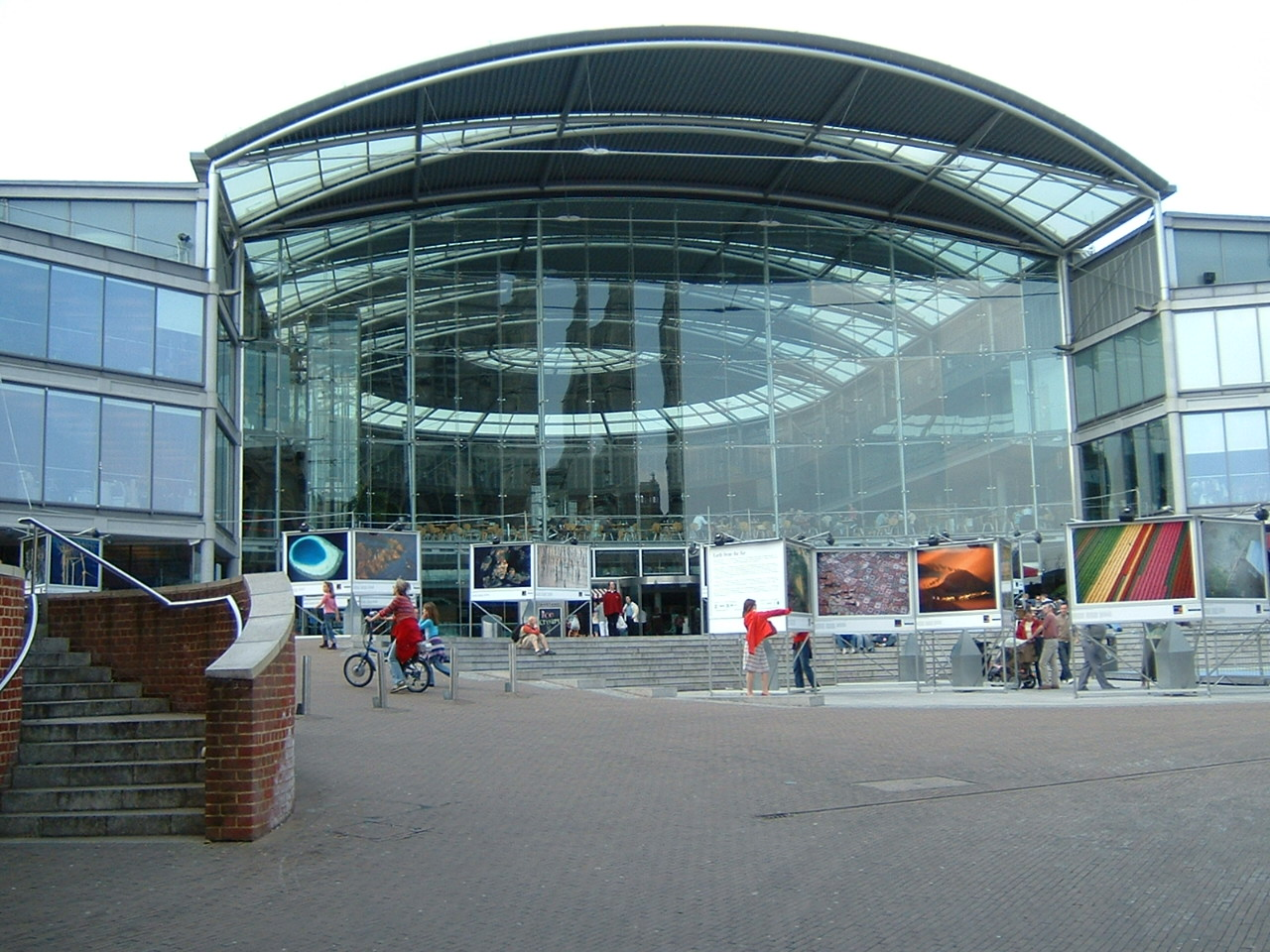
The Forum, where BBC East has been based since 2003.

BBC East's main headquarters and studios are based at The Forum on Millennium Plain in Norwich, having moved from St Catherine's Close in 2003. The move to The Forum was a result of a number of factors: the listed status of the building restricted much of what the BBC did there, the location was less central than the BBC wanted, their ideal location being in Norwich city centre, the equipment was becoming old and needed replacing, and the Disability Discrimination Act meant that their headquarters now needed major modifications to comply with the law.

BBC East also has local radio studios and newsrooms in Cambridge, Chelmsford, Northampton, Ipswich, and Dunstable.

== See also ==
- BBC English Regions
