= Norfolk Tower =

11-storey tower in Norwich, England

Coordinates: 52.6234°N 1.2957°E

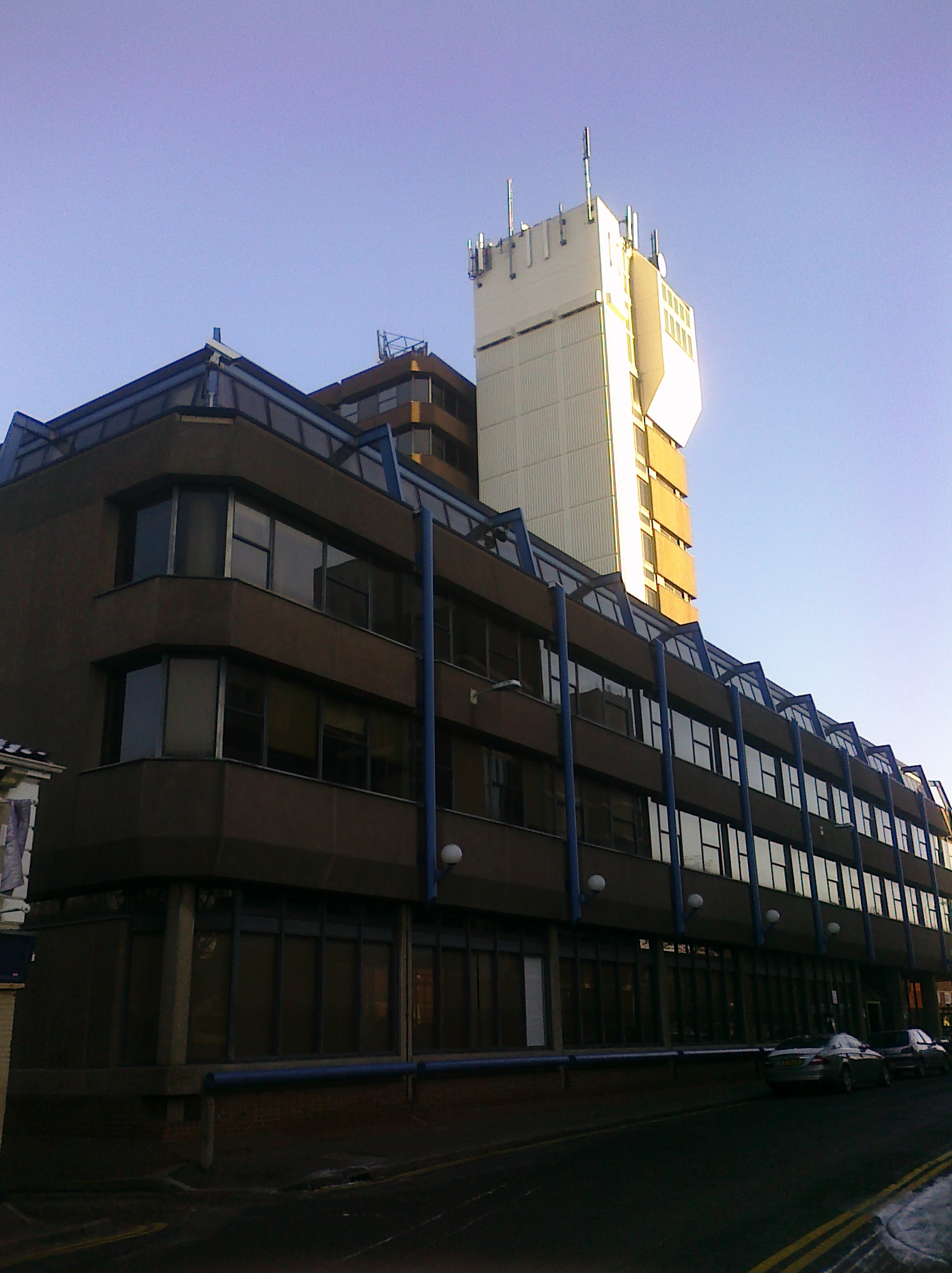
Norfolk Tower

Norfolk Tower on the north side of Surrey Street in Norwich, England is one of the city's tallest buildings. Standing at 45 metres tall, the building was completed in 1974. Former occupants of the building have included BBC Radio Norfolk and insurance company Norwich Union.

The building is an 11-storey office building of 63,600 sq ft (5,910 m^{2}) with 45 car spaces. The upper floors four to ten are roughly 3,500 to 4,000 sq ft (370 m^{2}) each and are mainly open plan. The first three floors are bigger at the front of the building at around 7,000 sq ft (650 m^{2}) per floor (i.e. providing a total of 10,000 sq ft (930 m^{2}) per floor). The core area is situated towards the front of the building.

The building was bought in March 2010 by the company Mahb Capital, which was founded by local businessmen Matt Bartram, John Maynard and Anthony Hunt.

== Residents ==
- BBC Radio Norfolk - 1980–2003
- Norwich Union - until 2008
- VoiceHost
- Proxama (Incorporating Hypertag)
- Morliny Foods
- Norwich Trust Limited
- Balloon Dog
- NDI
- Cotswold Company
- Hewlett-Packard - until 2015
- Optimise
- MAHB
