= Tacolneston transmitting station =

Transmitter station in the UK

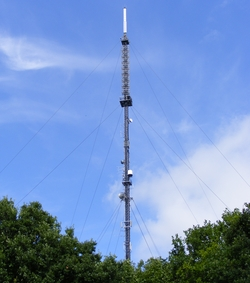
- 165m (pre-DSO) mast at Tacolneston

- Location within Norfolk
- Location: Wymondham Road, Tacolneston, Norfolk
- Mast height: 165.0 metres (541 ft)
- Coordinates: 52°31′04″N 1°08′20″E
- Grid reference: TM131958
- Built: 1954, August 1956
- Owner: Arqiva
- BBC region: BBC East
- ITV region: ITV Anglia
- Local TV service: That's Norfolk
- Digital switchover: 9 November 2011 / 23 November 2011

The Tacolneston transmitting station is a facility for both analogue and digital VHF/FM radio and UHF television transmission near Tacolneston, 11 miles (18 km) south-west of Norwich, Norfolk, England.

It includes a 206.1 metres (676 ft) tall guyed steel lattice mast, which was built between 2009 and 2012, and previously a 149.0 metres (489 ft) tall guyed steel lattice mast, which was built in 1956 (completed in late September/early October that year). On top of the current mast is located the UHF television transmitting antenna, which brings the overall height of the structure to 206.1 metres (676 ft) (the overall height of the previous mast being 165.0 metres (541 ft)).

The transmitter provides broadcast television and radio services to Norfolk and north Suffolk. However, northwestern parts of Norfolk including King's Lynn and Wells-next-the-Sea receive better TV signals from the Belmont TV transmitter situated in north Lincolnshire but the local relay transmitters in both towns receive signals from the Tacolneston transmitter.

== History ==
=== Construction ===
The station's original mast, built from early 1954, was 61 metres (200 ft) tall and first broadcast television transmissions, albeit temporarily, from 1 February 1955.

VHF (FM) radio broadcasts began on a test basis from 22 December 1956, in order to allow East Anglia to receive programmes on VHF over the Christmas period. The BBC Light Programme was not available during this test phase, and there were warnings that the service would occasionally be interrupted for engineering reasons.

The main structure was built by J. L. Eve Construction in August 1956, for the new BBC East region. The Peterborough BBC mast was the same height and shape as Tacolneston, built in October 1959, and carried BBC television, before Sandy Heath.

In February 1958, the ITA was looking to put an Anglia transmitter, possibly at either Tacolneston, Snetterton, or Mendlesham in central Suffolk.

=== Transmissions ===
The station began broadcasting regular programmes from Norwich purely for East Anglian audiences on the Midlands Home Service from Tuesday 5 February 1957, and the transmitter went to full power for VHF from 6.35pm on Tuesday 30 April 1957.

Regular television broadcasts began from Monday 8 October 1956. On 27 January 1957 the first regional television broadcast for East Anglia only was made, from Tacolneston itself, to publicise the VHF service. On Monday 9 June 1958 the TV transmission power was doubled.

The transmission site is located at 52° 31' 3.9" North, 1° 8' 19.3" East (National Grid Reference: TM131958). In July 1989, it was reported that the transmitting station cost almost £500,000 a year to run.

Arqiva (formerly National Grid Wireless) announced, on 6 August 2007, that they plan to replace the current 165 metres (541 ft) mast with a new 206.1 metres (676 ft) mast in order to ensure good digital TV reception across East Anglia after digital switchover, which took place in the area in November 2011. Arqiva also plan to replace the original transmitter hall at this site as it has now reached the end of its useful life. Work was completed on the new structure in September 2013 and the old 165m mast was dismantled in 2014.

== Structure ==
The current mast has an average height of 221 metres above sea level. It is now owned and operated by Arqiva, but was owned by the BBC before they privatised their transmission department prior to 1997.

== Radio services listed by frequency ==
=== Analogue radio (FM VHF) ===
Frequency (MHz)	kW	Service
89.7	125 (V) + 125 (H)	BBC Radio 2
91.9	125 (V) + 125 (H)	BBC Radio 3
94.1	125 (V) + 125 (H)	BBC Radio 4
99.3	125 (V) + 125 (H)	BBC Radio 1
101.5	125 (V) + 125 (H)	Classic FM

=== Digital radio (DAB) ===
Frequency (MHz)	Block	kW	Operator
218.640	11D	1.4	Digital One
225.648	12B	5	BBC National DAB

== Television services listed by frequency ==
=== Digital television ===
Digital transmissions became at least ten times stronger in power after the digital switchover (DSO), and their frequencies were reorganised.

Frequency (MHz)	UHF	kW	Operator	System
618.000 MHz	39	100	Arqiva B	DVB-T
626.000 MHz	40	100	BBC A	DVB-T
642.000 MHz	42	100	SDN	DVB-T
650.000 MHz	43	100	D3+4	DVB-T
666.000 MHz	45	100	Arqiva A	DVB-T
674.000 MHz	46	100	BBC B	DVB-T2

At Tacolneston, extra HD muxes are being broadcast on UHF 55 and UHF 56, along with a local TV service (That's Norfolk) using an interleaved frequency on UHF 32 (QPSK 8K 3/4 8.0 Mbit/s).

Frequency (MHz)	UHF	kW	Operator	System
562.000 MHz	32	10	LNR	DVB-T
746.000 MHz	55	18	Com 7	DVB-T2

==== Before switchover ====
Frequency (MHz)	UHF	kW	Operator
730.166 MHz	53+	5	SDN (Mux A)
834.000 MHz	66 (WAS 58- TILL THE 17TH OF AUGUST 2011)	5	BBC (Mux B)
786.000 MHz	60	10	Digital 3&4 (Mux 2)
850.000 MHz	68	5	Arqiva (Mux C) *WAS 61 TILL THE 17TH OF AUGUST 2011)
810.000 MHz	63	10	BBC (Mux 1)
818.000 MHz	64	5	Arqiva (Mux D)

=== Analogue television ===
Tacolneston switched to digital-only television transmissions in November 2011; analogue BBC Two transmissions ceased on 9 November, and two weeks later, on 23 November 2011, the other four analogue channels ceased analogue transmissions.

Frequency (MHz)	UHF	kW	Service
719.25 MHz	52	4	Channel 5
743.25 MHz	55	250	BBC2 East
775.25 MHz	59	250	Anglia
799.25 MHz	62	250	BBC1 East
823.25 MHz	65	250	Channel 4

== See also ==
- List of masts
- List of tallest structures in the United Kingdom
- List of radio stations in the United Kingdom
