= BBC Look East =

British TV news programme (since 1964)

- Title card used since April 2022
- Theme music composer: David Lowe
- Country of origin: United Kingdom
- Original language: English

Production
- Producers: BBC News; BBC East
- Production locations: Norwich, England, UK
- Camera setup: Multi-camera
- Running time: 30 minutes (main 6:30 pm programme); 10 minutes (1:30 pm and 10:30 pm programmes); Various (on weekends and Breakfast)

Original release
- Network: BBC One East
- Release: 29 September 1964 – present

BBC Look East is a BBC regional television news service for the East of England, produced by BBC East.

== History ==
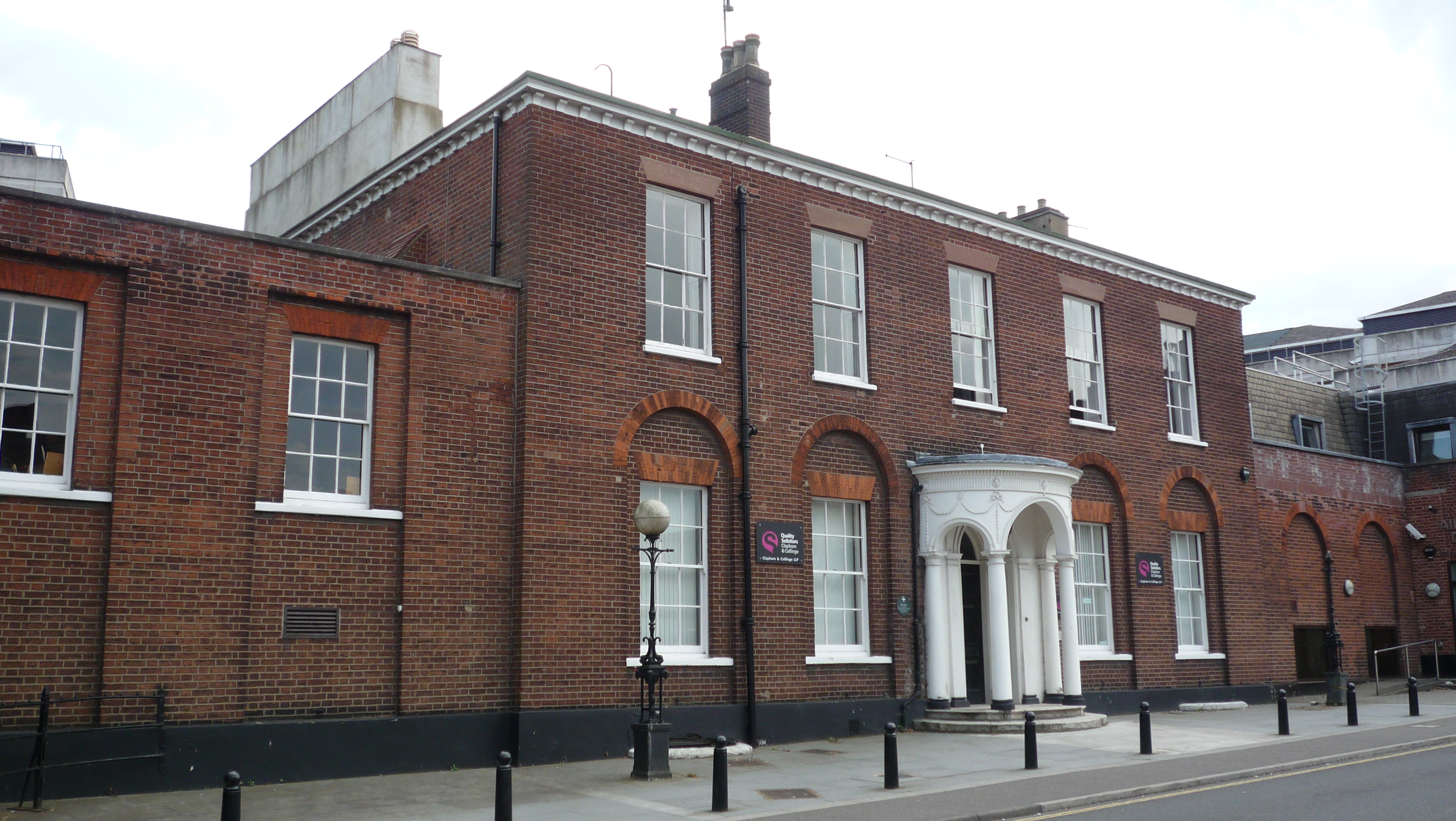
St Catherine's House on All Saints Green in Norwich, where Look East was based from its inception until 2003. (Pictured in 2012)

The first BBC television news bulletins for the East of England began at 6.05 pm on 5 October 1959. These new bulletins, launched three weeks ahead of the launch of regional ITV station Anglia Television were initially ten minutes long.

The bulletin was extended to 20 minutes in September 1962 and renamed East Anglia at Six, and then a year later renamed East at Six Ten due to a change in timeslot. Another change in timeslot saw it renamed as Look East from 28 September 1964, although that evening's programme failed to go out due to a breakdown and Look East instead began on September 29.

Look East is broadcast from BBC East's headquarters at The Forum, Norwich. Prior to 29 September 2003, the programme aired from studios in St Catherine's Close, Norwich.

The programme can be watched in any part of the UK (and Europe) on Sky Digital channel 961 "east" and channel 962 for the "west" sub-regional service from Cambridge, or Freesat channels 953 (East) and 954 (West), on the BBC UK regional TV on satellite service. The services were added to the Sky Digital platform on 29 July 2003 and were available on Freesat from launch.

Some areas that are well covered by Look East receive better television signals from other transmitters in other regions on Freeview. Most of Southend and parts of Chelmsford, Luton and Stevenage receive better television signals from the Crystal Palace transmitter which broadcast London News and viewers in King’s Lynn, Hunstanton and Wells-next-the-Sea get better signals from the Belmont TV transmitter that broadcast Look North.

However, those areas are given Look East on Channel 101 through satellite television such as Freesat as default via the towns' postcodes.

The southeastern fringes of Leicestershire around Market Harborough receive Look East on Freeview as local news meaning the town receive better signals from the Sandy Heath transmitter rather than Waltham transmitter.

In 1997, BBC Look East launched the sub-regional service, Close Up, for viewers covered by the Sandy Heath transmitting station and its relays. The opt-out allowed the two sub-regions to provide, during the main evening programme, around 10 minutes of news relevant to their area.

From 2018 to 2022, there were two separate editions of BBC Look East, for the main programme and the late news bulletin on weeknights:

- BBC Look East - East which covered Norfolk, Suffolk and Essex
- BBC Look East - West which covered Cambridgeshire, Peterborough, Bedfordshire, Milton Keynes (Buckinghamshire), Northamptonshire, parts of Hertfordshire.

At the end of the 6:30 pm programme on 30 September 2021, Stewart White announced his retirement from the BBC after 37 years as a main presenter of Look East.

The West edition was broadcast from Cambridge, originally at the existing Hills Road studios for BBC Radio Cambridgeshire near the city centre and railway station, then from 2009 at the new BBC Cambridgeshire building at Cambridge Business Park near Cambridge North railway station.

On 26 May 2022, it was announced that following BBC cost-cutting measures the separate West edition of the programme would end, which it did in December 2022. The Cambridge TV studio closed, with all broadcasts from that point returning to their pre-1997 region-wide format, broadcast from the existing studios in Norwich. The Oxford edition of South Today was also scrapped.

== Broadcast times ==
On weekdays, BBC Look East broadcasts six three-minute opt-outs during BBC Breakfast at 27 and 57 minutes past each hour. A fifteen-minute lunchtime programme follows at 1:30 pm before the main 27-minute edition at 6:30 pm. A seven-minute late update is shown at 10:30 pm, following the BBC News at Ten.

BBC Look East also airs three bulletins during the weekend: two early evening bulletins on Saturday and Sunday and a late night bulletin on Sundays, following the BBC News at Ten. The times of these bulletins usually vary.

== Historical ==
From 2008 until 2018, the BBC One 8pm News Summary was a bulletin derived from the BBC Three 60 Seconds format, delivered across all BBC regions including BBC Look East with a separate set of paired presenters.

It was significant for younger audiences according to the BBC: "For 1.7 million viewers the 8 pm summary was the only BBC TV News they saw in that week with nearly 600,000 in the 16-34 year old bracket."

The regular 8 pm presenters included Janine Machin, Claudia Liza-Armah, and Mike Cartwright, with the last 8 pm broadcast from Cambridge and all BBC regions on Wednesday 30 May 2018.

== See also ==
- BBC News
- ITV News Anglia
