= BBC Radio Suffolk =

Radio station in Ipswich, England

Coordinates: 52.0603°N 1.1472°E

- Ipswich; England
- Broadcast area: Suffolk
- Frequencies: FM: 95.5 MHz (North-east Suffolk); FM: 95.9 MHz (East Suffolk); FM: 103.9 MHz (Central and south-east Suffolk); FM: 104.6 MHz (West Suffolk); DAB: 10C; Freeview: 712
- RDS: BBC Suff

Programming
- Language: English
- Format: Local news, talk, sport and music

Ownership
- Owner: BBC Local Radio, BBC East

History
- First air date: 12 April 1990

Technical information
- Licensing authority: Ofcom

Links
- Website: www.bbc.co.uk/sounds/play/live/bbc_radio_suffolk

BBC Radio Suffolk is the BBC's local radio station serving the county of Suffolk.

It broadcasts on FM, DAB, digital TV and via BBC Sounds from studios on St Matthews Street in Ipswich.

According to RAJAR, the station has a weekly audience of 97,000 listeners and a 6.7% share as of December 2023.

== Overview ==
BBC Radio Suffolk began broadcasting on 12 April 1990. In 2004, it won was named Station of the Year in the Sony Radio Academy Awards.

Significant cuts to BBC Local Radio introduced by Tim Davie during his tenure as Director General of the BBC reduced the content produced in Suffolk to less than a quarter of the station's output in late Summer 2023.

== Technical ==
BBC Radio Suffolk broadcasts to north-east Suffolk on 95.5 FM from the Oulton transmitter, East Suffolk on 95.9 FM from the Aldeburgh transmitter, Ipswich and south-east Suffolk on 103.9 FM from the Manningtree transmitter and West Suffolk on 104.6 FM from the Great Barton transmitter.

DAB transmissions from the Suffolk MUX began on 7 October 2017, on digital frequency 10C from Mendlesham (Central Suffolk and Ipswich), Puttock's Hill (Bury St Edmunds), Warren Heath (Ipswich), Felixstowe (Town and Dock area). Due to the low number of masts currently in use, there is a lack of coverage along the Suffolk coast north of Felixstowe to Lowestoft. Sudbury, Newmarket, Haverhill, Lowestoft, Southwold, Beccles and Bungay also have very poor or no DAB coverage of the Suffolk MUX. BBC Radio Suffolk was the penultimate BBC Local Radio station to launch on DAB.

The station was added to Freeview channel 720 in the East of England on 6 June 2016, broadcasting from the Sudbury and Tacolneston transmitters and their dependent relays. The station is also available to stream via BBC Sounds.

== Programming ==
Local programming is now only produced and broadcast from the BBC's Ipswich studios from 6 am to 2pm on Mondays to Fridays - reduced to eight hours per weekday, with no local coverage at all at weekends. There are two exceptions to this: two one-hour sports shows on Mondays and Fridays at 6pm and live football commentary during Ipswich Town men's matches.

This "cull" in service followed the BBC Local Radio cuts introduced by Tim Davie at the end of Summer 2023. All other content for the station is produced in Cambridge, London and the Midlands, with "split links" and pre-recorded news/travel bulletins giving the listener the impression that the station still produces content from Suffolk outside the 6am to 2pm weekday slots. Before the cuts, there was live coverage of Ipswich Town women's matches for significant games. It is unclear whether this will continue at present.

Radio Suffolk is licensed to broadcast commentary on all of Ipswich Town's league and cup games on FM and DAB, but not on Freeview or via BBC Sounds.

== See also ==
- Suffolk Youth Orchestra
