= East Norfolk =

- Proposed unitary authority area
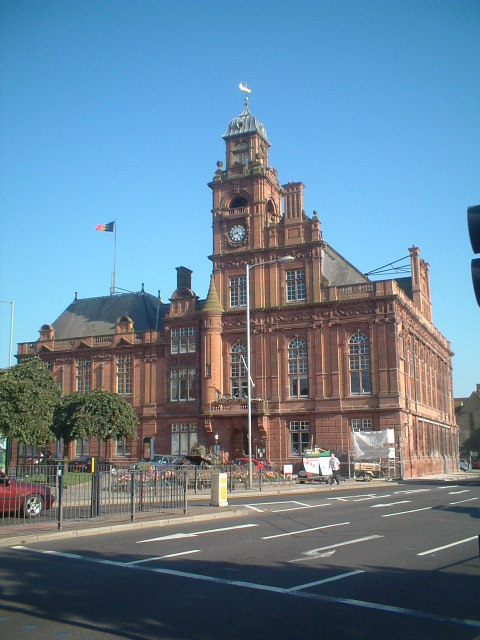
- Great Yarmouth

- East Norfolk shown within Norfolk
- Interactive map
- Coordinates: 52.6°N 1.7°E
- Sovereign state: United Kingdom
- Country: England
- Region: East
- Ceremonial county: Norfolk

Government
  - Type: Unitary authority
  - Body: East Norfolk Council

Population (2024 estimate)
  - Total: 340,956
- Time zone: UTC+0 (GMT)
  - Summer (DST): UTC+1 (BST)

East Norfolk was a proposed unitary authority area that was scheduled to be created in Norfolk, England, as part of ongoing local government reform. It would have been formed from four existing districts: Great Yarmouth, North Norfolk, Broadland less 19 parishes, and South Norfolk less 25 parishes.

The first councillors would have been elected in May 2027, and the new authority would have assumed full powers in April 2028. The largest settlement in the district would have been Great Yarmouth. The Great Yarmouth part of the current Great Yarmouth district is currently unparished, the rest of the district is parished. The area has a population of 336,000.

Plans to create it were withdrawn in September 2026.

== Formation ==
It was being formed as part of ongoing local government changes throughout England, in which all areas of the country that have separate county councils and district councils will see those replaced with single-tier, or unitary, local governance. The alternative proposals for a single unitary and a two unitary solution were not accepted.

In September 2026, the Norfolk proposals were withdrawn by the government in light of new legal advice. The decision was threatened with judicial review by Norfolk County Council and South Norfolk Council.

== Settlements ==
The major towns and villages in the district would have been:

- Great Yarmouth
- Gorleston-on-Sea
- Wymondham
- North Walsham
- Bradwell
- Diss
- Caister-on-Sea
- Fakenham
- Cromer
- Aylsham
- Sheringham
- Hemsby
- Long Stratton
- Harleston
