= Farnborough, Berkshire =

Coordinates: 51°32′02″N 1°22′41″W

Farnborough
- Village
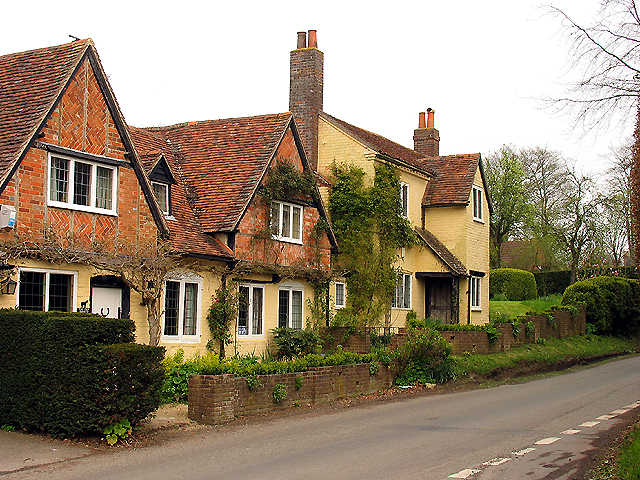
- The Old Smithy, a 17th-century cottage

- Location within Berkshire
- Area: 10.5 km^{2} (4.1 sq mi)
- Population: 102 (combined with Catmore, 2011 Census)
  - Density: 10/km^{2} (26/sq mi)
- OS grid reference: SU432820
- Civil parish: Farnborough
- Unitary authority: West Berkshire
- Ceremonial county: Berkshire
- Region: South East
- Country: England
- Sovereign state: United Kingdom
- Post town: Wantage
- Postcode district: OX12
- Dialling code: 01488
- Police: Thames Valley
- Fire: Royal Berkshire
- Ambulance: South Central
- UK Parliament: Newbury

Farnborough is a village and civil parish in West Berkshire, about 4 miles (6.4 km) south of Wantage. The village is 720 feet (220 m) above sea level on a ridge aligned east – west in the Berkshire Downs. It is the highest village in Berkshire.

== Geography ==
The Office for National Statistics no longer publishes Farnborough's population total separately. For the 2011 Census the ONS grouped Farnborough with its smaller neighbour Catmore. It recorded the combined population of the two parishes as 102. But Farnborough remains a separate civil parish, governed by its own parish meeting.

Farnborough parish comprises 1,886 acres (763 ha) of chalk downland. Due to the porosity of the chalk and the village's hilltop position, the only supplies of groundwater are at great depth. The parish's lowest point is east of the village, 511 feet (156 m) above sea level.

Since the 1974 boundary changes, the northern boundary of the parish has formed part of Berkshire's county boundary with Oxfordshire. The B4494 road linking Wantage and Newbury passes about 1/2 mile (800 m) west of the village, forming part of the western boundary of the parish.

== Toponym ==
Farnborough's toponym is derived from Old English and means "fern-clad hills". In this case "borough" is derived from beorg, meaning a mountain, hill or tumulus, and not from burh, a fortified settlement.

A 9th-century document records the manor as Feornberge. It appears as Fearnbeorgan in the Cartularium Saxonicum in records from AD 916 and 931. Other 10th-century documents record it as Fearnbornthaen, Fearbeorh, and Feornbeorh. The Domesday Book of 1086 records it as Fermeberge. Another 11th-century document records it as Fernbeorngan. Later forms include Fernbergam in the 12th century and Fearnberughe, Ferenburgh and Farnberg in the 13th century.

== Manor ==
Abingdon Abbey seems to have held the manor from the 9th century. In 1538 it surrendered its estates to the Crown in the Dissolution of the Monasteries. In 1540 the Crown granted the manor to Edward Fettiplace, whose family held several manors in Berkshire. But in 1542 Fettiplace sold Farnborough to a John Wynchcombe of Newbury, whose heirs held the manor until it was sold in 1671. It then descended through the Jennett, Raymond and Craven families until the late 18th century, when a Fulwar Craven sold it to the Rev. William Wroughton. It was still held by a member of the Wroughton family early in the 1920s.

== Parish church ==
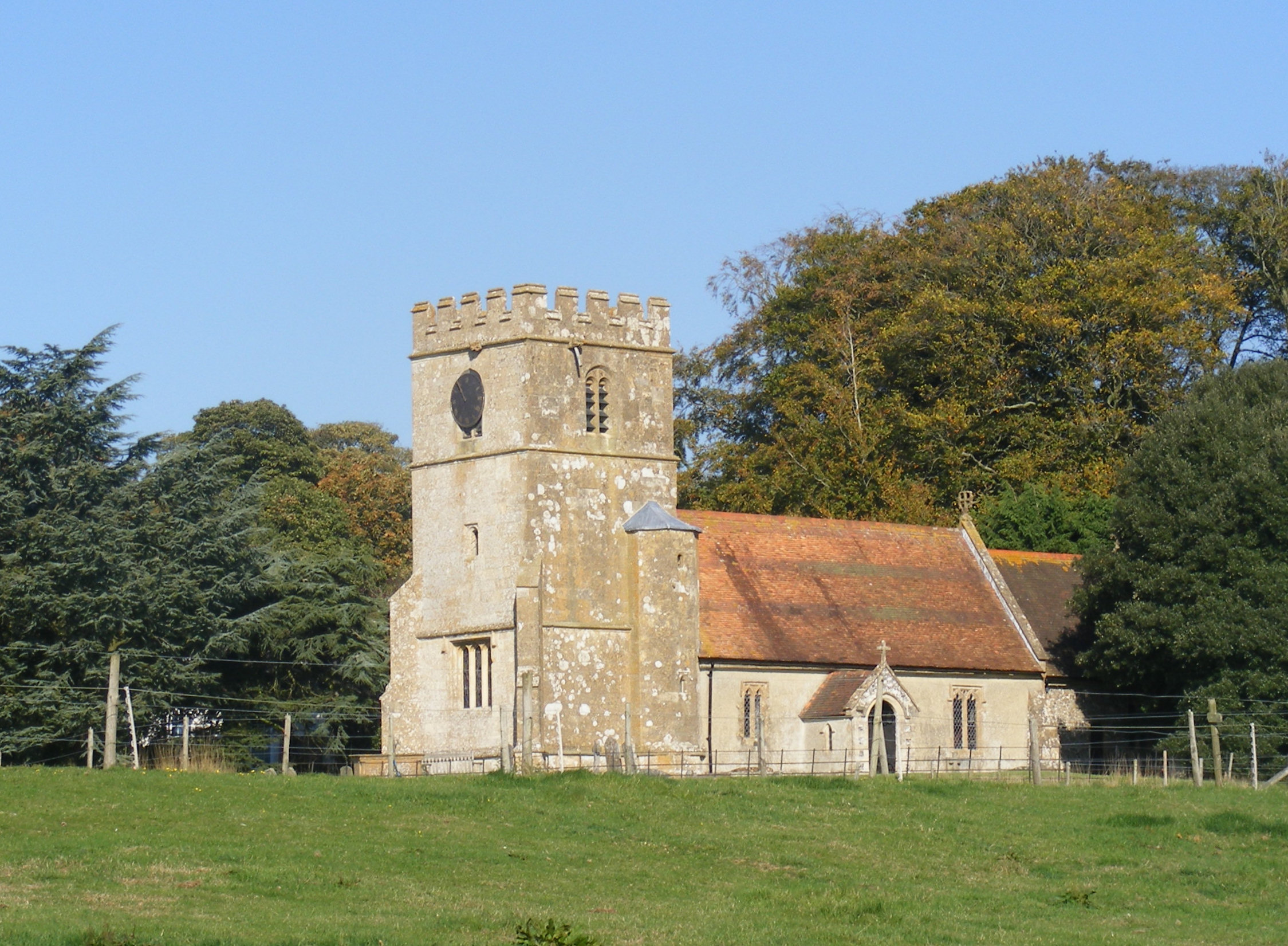
All Saints' parish church

The earliest parts of the Church of England Church of All Saints are 11th-century and include the Norman nave and north doorway. The chancel has a 13th-century piscina. The church was altered in the 14th century and the west tower is Perpendicular Gothic, possibly 15th-century.

The building was restored in 1883 and 1885, which involved reroofing, new windows, widening the chancel arch, adding buttresses to the nave and building or rebuilding the south porch. One window has stained glass made by John Piper and Joseph Nuttgens in 1986, in memory of the poet John Betjeman, who lived at the Old Rectory from 1945 to 1951. Piper and Betjeman were friends who worked together on the Shell Guides. The window shows a tree of life flanked by fish on one side and butterflies on the other, intended to symbolise the resurrection.

The west tower has a ring of five bells. The foundry at Wokingham cast the third and tenor bells in about 1499. Edward Read of Aldbourne in Wiltshire cast the fourth bell in 1753. Mears and Stainbank of the Whitechapel Bell Foundry cast the second bell in 1927 and the treble bell in 1937. All Saints has two Sanctus bells: one cast in about 1599 and the other cast in about 1799. The 1799 Sanctus bell is unringable.

All Saints is a Grade I listed building.

== Economic and social history ==
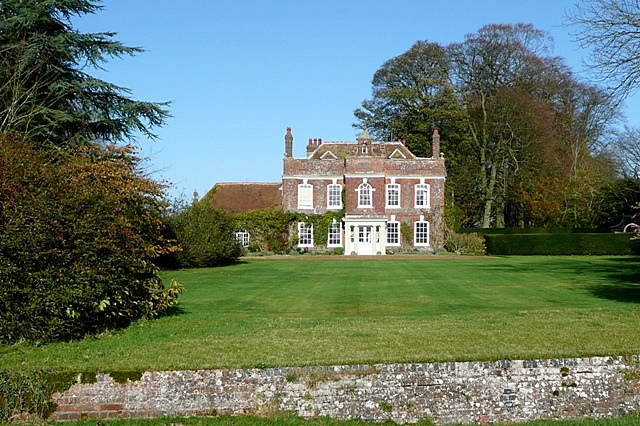
The Old Rectory, former home of Sir John Betjeman

The village is on a former packhorse route between Hungerford and Oxford via Abingdon-on-Thames. In the 18th century the route was diverted. A continuation of the route is evident near East Hendred. The parish's common lands were inclosed in 1777.

In 1848 Samuel Lewis recorded that the major part of the parish was sheep pasture. He noted too the parish population was 204, presumably drawing on the 1841 Census. That is about double the parish's population in the early 21st century.

The Old Rectory is a Georgian house built in 1749 of grey brick with red-brick dressings. From 1945 to 1951 it was the home of John Betjeman, who was Poet Laureate from 1972 to 1984. The building is Grade II listed.

== Bibliography ==
- Anonymous (2012). John Piper and the Church a Stained-Glass Tour of Selected Local Churches. Dorchester-on-Thames: Friends of Dorchester Abbey.
- College Bursar, ed. (1953). "Betjeman, John". Marlborough College Register 1843–1952. Marlborough: Marlborough College. p. 653.
- Ekwall, Eilert (1960) [1936]. Concise Oxford Dictionary of English Place-Names (4th ed.). Oxford: Oxford University Press. Farnborough. ISBN 0198691033.
- Ditchfield, PH; Page, William, eds. (1924). "Farnborough". A History of the County of Berkshire. Victoria County History. Vol. IV. assisted by John Hautenville Cope. London: The St Katherine Press. pp. 21–24.
- Lewis, Samuel, ed. (1931) [1848]. "Farmborough (All Saints)". A Topographical Dictionary of England (Seventh ed.). London: Samuel Lewis. pp. 213–216.
- Pevsner, Nikolaus (1966). Berkshire. The Buildings of England. Harmondsworth: Penguin Books. p. 143.
