= June Osborne (disambiguation) =

June Osborne (born 1953) is a retired Anglican bishop.

June Osborne or similar may refer to:

- June Osborne (The Handmaid's Tale), fictional character
- June E. Osborn (born 1937), American medical school professor
- June Osborne (historian), English art historian
