= All Saints Church, Farnborough =

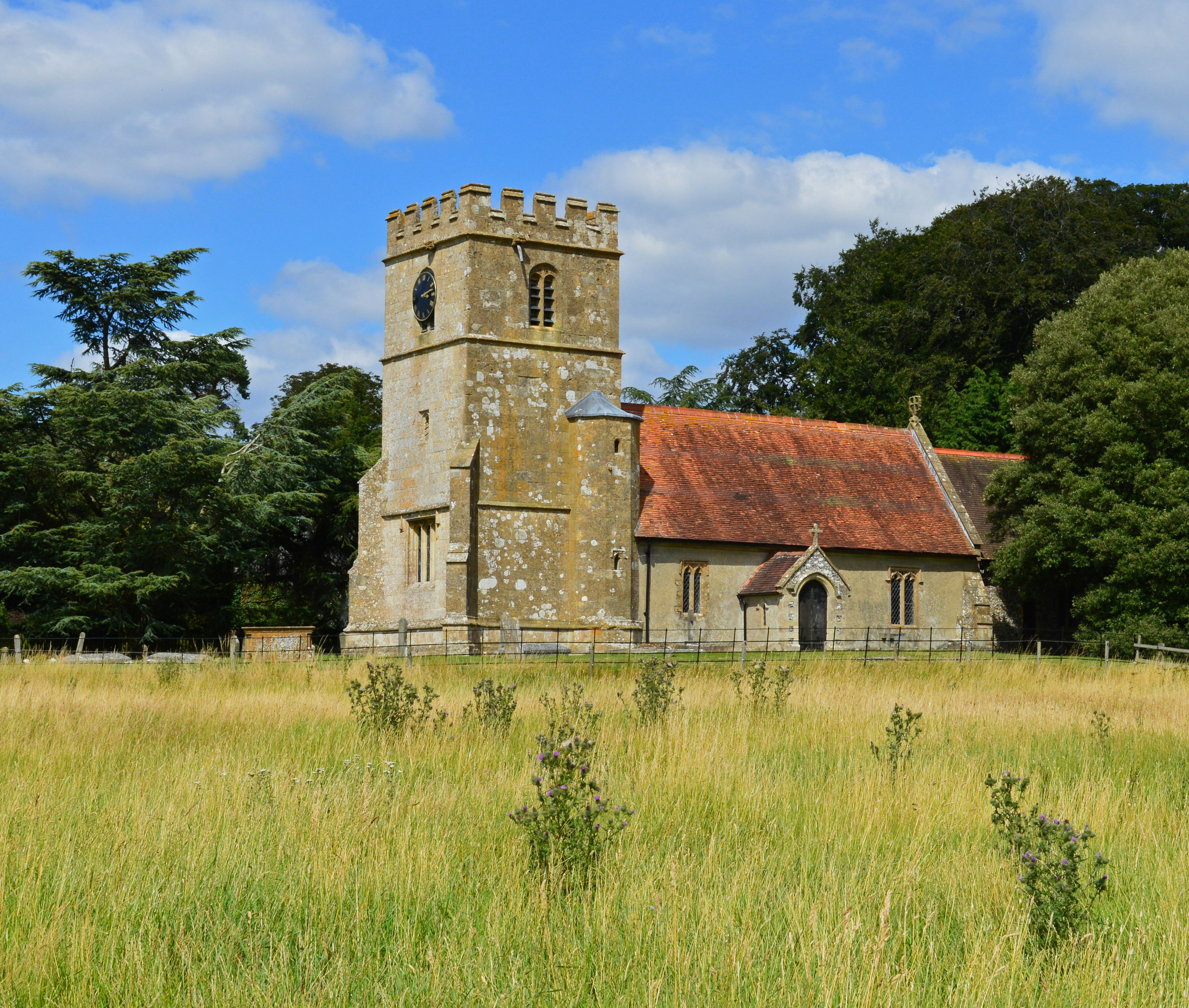
- All Saints Church, Farnborough
- 51.534674°N 1.374032°W
- OS grid reference: SU 43515 81936
- Location: Farnborough, Berkshire
- Country: England
- Denomination: Church of England

History
- Dedication: All Saints

Architecture
- Heritage designation: Grade I Listed
- Style: Norman origins; Perpendicular Gothic tower; Victorian restoration

Administration
- Diocese: Oxford
- Parish: Farnborough

All Saints Church, Farnborough is a Grade I listed Church of England parish church in Farnborough, Berkshire, England.

== History and architecture ==
All Saints Church dates to the 11th century, with its surviving Norman nave and north doorway constructed of flint with Bath stone dressings and partial rendering. The Perpendicular Gothic west tower, probably raised in the 15th century, has three stages, diagonal buttresses, an embattled parapet, and a stair turret at its junction with the nave. A independently Grade II-listed base of a medieval churchyard cross stands approximately five metres south of the south door.

The church was restored 1883–1885, when a south porch was added, new chancel windows were inserted, the chancel arch widened (with supporting buttresses), and the roof renewed.

== Interior ==
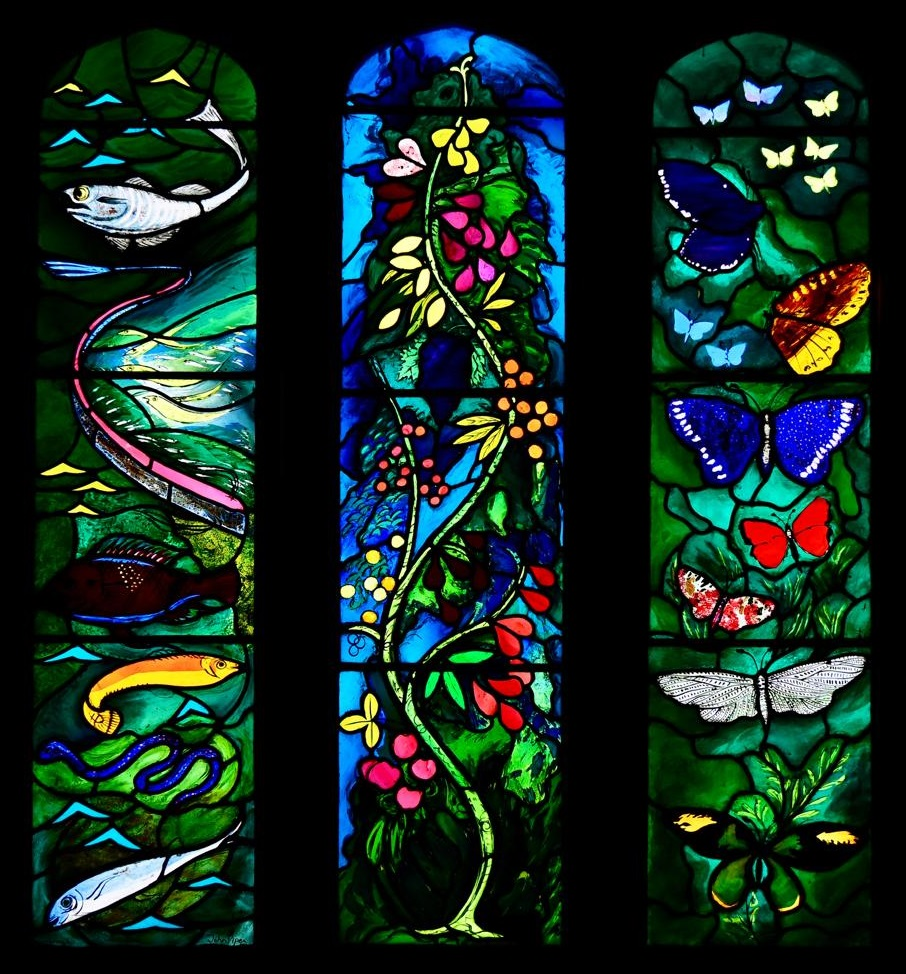
John Betjeman memorial window by John Piper, 1986

The interior is plastered and painted, comprising a four-bay nave and a two-bay chancel, both under timber roofs. The chancel arch springs from molded brackets, while the tower arch is embellished with carved angel figures at its springing. The east window is flanked by two late-17th-century marble memorial plaques that commemorate William Garnam (and wife) and Bartholomew Price (with wife and daughter), adorned with leaf decorations, skull motifs, and curved pediments.

Although the stonework of the east window is 15th-century, the stained glass depicting Christ Preaching is Victorian. It was inserted during the 1883-1885 restoration.

In the west wall, beneath the tower, is a stained glass window installed in 1986, designed by John Piper and manufactured by Joseph A. Nuttgens. Across its three lights are depicted symbols of the Resurrection - fish, the Tree of Life, and butterflies. It was commissioned in memory of Poet Laureate Sir John Betjeman, who lived in the neighboring rectory from 1945 to 1951, by the Friends of Friendless Churches. Piper and Betjeman had collaborated together on the Shell Guides.

== Bells ==
The tower has a ring of five bells. The foundry at Wokingham cast the third and tenor bells in about 1499. Edward Read of Aldbourne in Wiltshire cast the fourth bell in 1753. Mears and Stainbank of the Whitechapel Bell Foundry cast the second bell in 1927 and the treble bell in 1937. All Saints has two Sanctus bells: one cast in about 1599 and the other cast in about 1799. The 1799 Sanctus bell is unringable.
