= St Paul's Church, Harlow =

- Church of St Paul
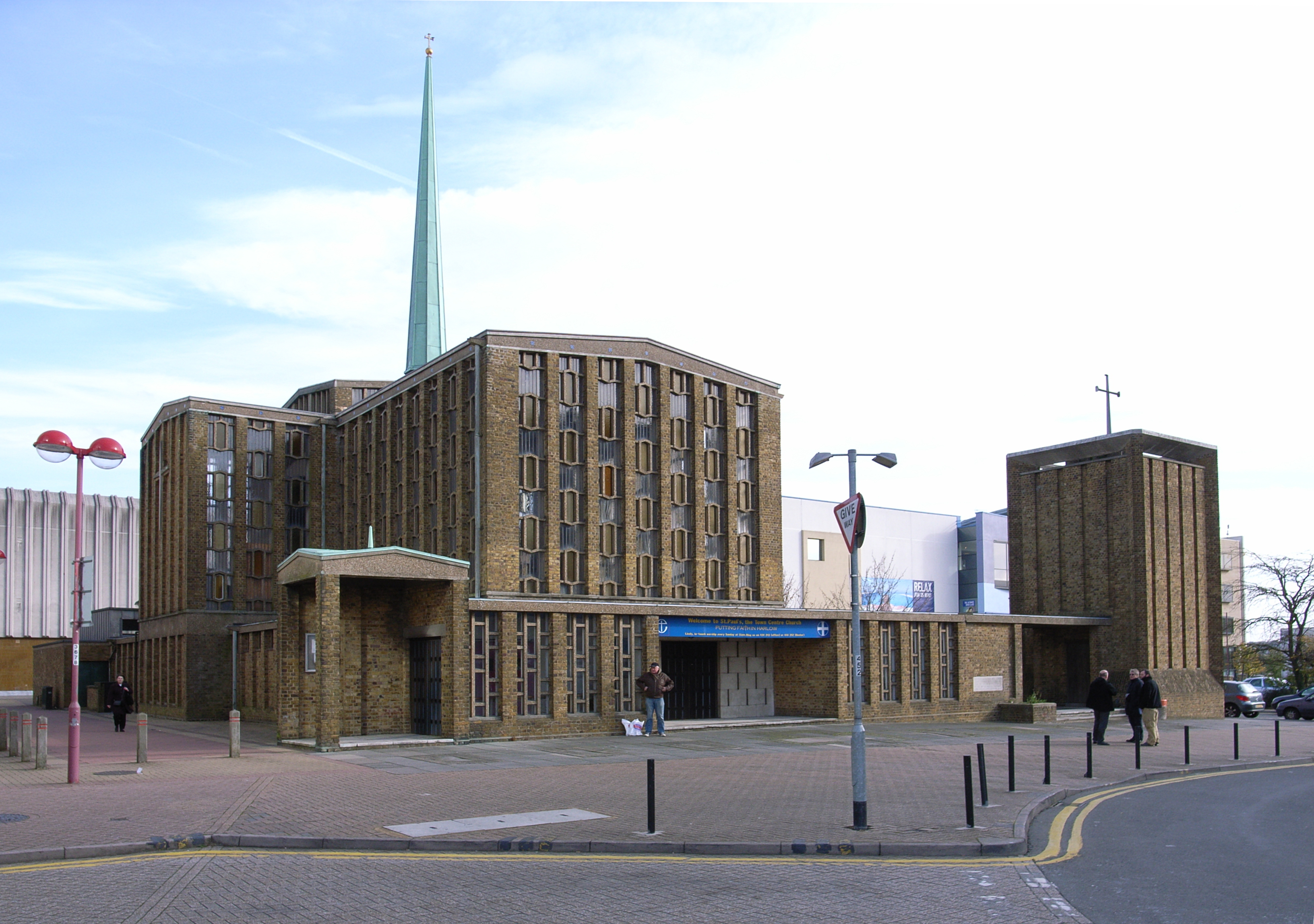
- St Paul's Church, Harlow
- 51.7682331°N 0.0928346°E
- OS grid reference: TL 44514 09805
- Location: Harlow, Essex
- Country: England
- Denomination: Anglican

History
- Status: Parish church

Architecture
- Functional status: Active
- Heritage designation: Grade II listed
- Designated: 1994
- Architect(s): Derrick Humphrys and Reginald Hurst
- Style: Modern
- Years built: 1957–1959

Administration
- Diocese: Chelmsford

St Paul's Church is a Church of England parish church located in the new town of Harlow, Essex, England. Designed by Derrick Humphrys and Reginald Hurst, it was built between 1957 and 1959. It is a Grade II listed building.

== History ==
The church was commissioned to serve as the mother church for Harlow New Town, which was developed after the Second World War by the architect and town planner Frederick Gibberd to rehouse people from East London - then still part of the county of Essex - who had been permanently displaced by the destruction of the Blitz. Derrick Humphrys and Reginald Hurst, then serving as architects to the Harlow Development Corporation, were responsible for the design. Construction took place between 1957 and 1959, with fitting out continuing into 1961.

St Paul's ring of bells were brought from a bomb-damaged church in East London. Their relocation was intended as a symbolic act, echoing the journey of many of Harlow's early inhabitants from war-damaged parts of the capital.

In 2013 the Twentieth Century Society named St Paul's Church as one of the 10 best modern church buildings in the UK.

== Architecture ==
=== Exterior ===
St Paul's is set on a short cruciform plan with nave, sanctuary, and small transepts. To the south-east lies the Chapel of the Holy Spirit, while vestries are placed to the north-east. The walls are built of load-bearing brown stock brick, contrasting with modernist concrete mullions and pre-cast tracery that frame large expanses of glazing.

A copper-clad flèche rises over the clerestoried crossing. The nave is set behind a low narthex that extends to an open porch with mosaic inserts under a shallow-pitched roof. To the south-west stands a freestanding bell tower, linked to the church by a raised platform. The tower includes an external pulpit decorated with blue mosaic.

=== Interior ===
The interior is both architecturally and liturgically ambitious. The ceiling treatments are reminiscent of the Festival of Britain style: dark red ceilings over the aisles, blue ceilings with white beams over the nave and transepts, and a gold-painted ceiling above the sanctuary, which is further emphasised by the clerestory. The glazing scheme consists of three large “nets” of plain glass with yellow lozenges-shaped panes that emphasise the form of the tracery.

The liturgical fittings, largely designed by Hurst, are contemporary with construction. They are complemented by additional artworks: a 16th-century sculpture of the Virgin, a Crucifixion icon (c.1960) by Zdzisław Ruszkowski, and a processional cross (c.1960) by John Skelton.

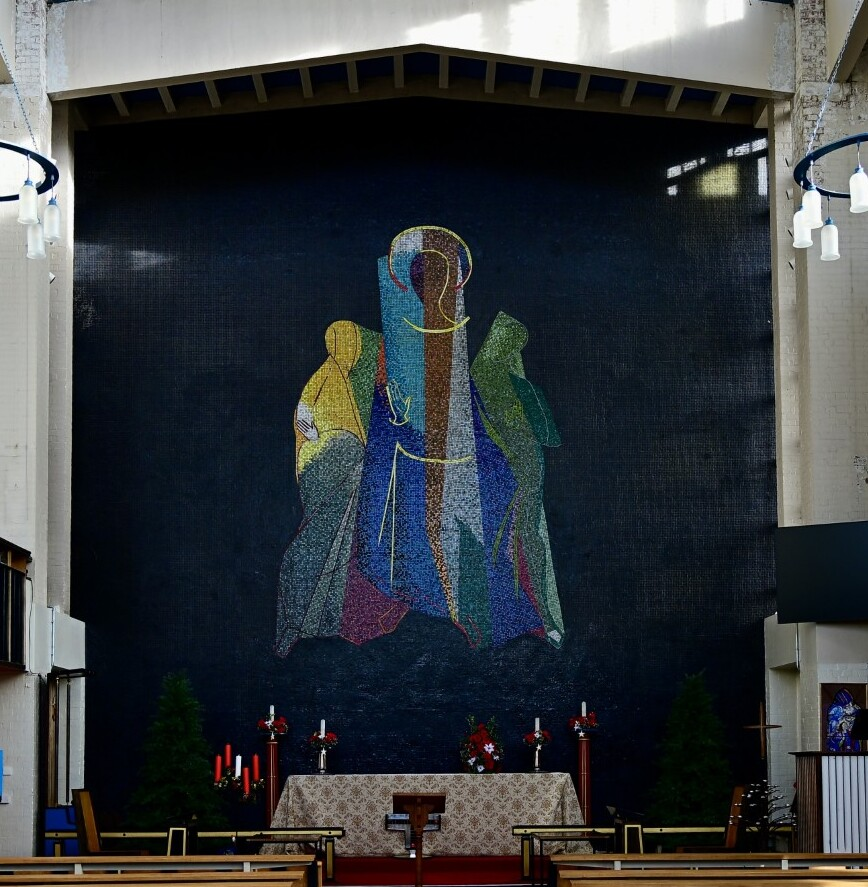
Jesus at Emmaus mosaic by John Piper

The most prominent artwork is a near floor-to-ceiling mosaic mural by John Piper, completed between 1960 and 1961. Dominating the east wall behind the altar, it depicts the moment of recognition of Jesus at Emmaus. Set against a striking black background, the work combines abstract and figurative elements. It is Piper's only large-scale mosaic for a liturgical setting and was undertaken concurrently with his work on the stained-glass baptistery window for Coventry Cathedral.

== Heritage designation ==
St Paul's Church was granted Grade II listed heritage status in 2007, recognising it as a major work of post-war church architecture and an important example of integrated liturgical design in a new town context.
