= John Piper (artist) =

English painter and printmaker (1903–1992)

John Piper CH
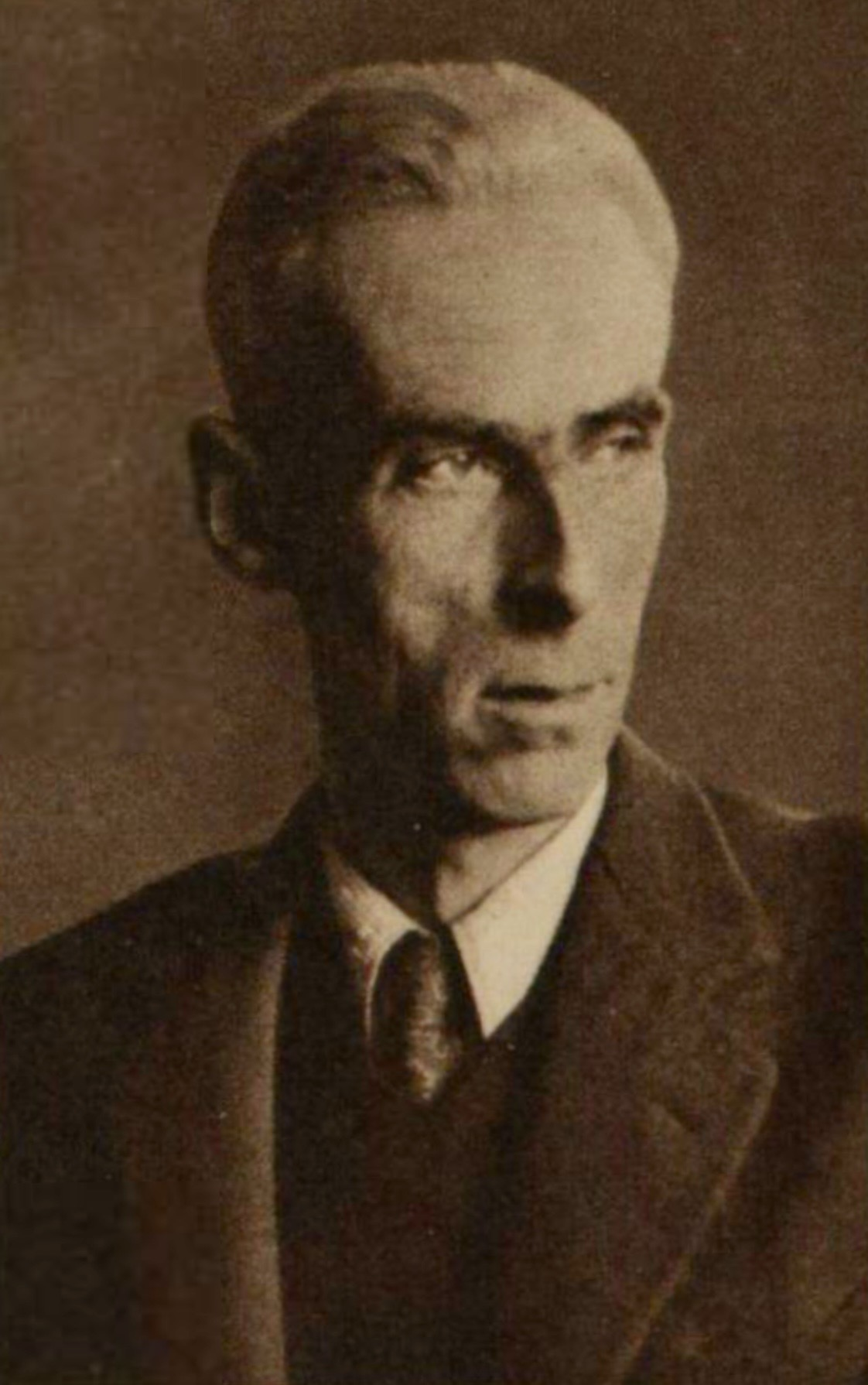
- John Piper in 1954
- Born: John Egerton Christmas Piper; 13 December 1903; Epsom, Surrey, England
- Died: 28 June 1992 (aged 88); Fawley Bottom, Buckinghamshire, England
- Education: Richmond School of Art; Royal College of Art
- Known for: Painting (oil and acrylic), printmaking, set design, stained glass, mosaic
- Notable work: Coventry Cathedral Baptistry Window
- Spouses: Eileen Holding (m. 1929–1936, divorced); Myfanwy Evans (m. 1937–1992, his death)
- Children: inc. Edward Piper
- Relatives: Luke Piper (grandson); Henry Piper (grandson)

John Egerton Christmas Piper CH (13 December 1903 – 28 June 1992) was an English painter, printmaker and designer of stained-glass windows and both opera and theatre sets. His work often focused on the British landscape, especially churches and monuments, and included tapestry designs, book jackets, screen prints, photography, fabrics and ceramics. He was educated at Epsom College and trained at the Richmond School of Art followed by the Royal College of Art in London. He turned from abstraction early in his career, concentrating on a more naturalistic but distinctive approach, but often worked in several different styles throughout his career.

Piper was an official war artist in World War II and his wartime depictions of bomb-damaged churches and landmarks, most notably those of Coventry Cathedral, made Piper a household name and led to his work being acquired by several public collections. Piper collaborated with many others, including the poets John Betjeman and Geoffrey Grigson on the Shell Guides, the potter Geoffrey Eastop and the artist Ben Nicholson. In his later years, he produced many limited-edition prints.

== Biography ==
=== Early life ===
John Piper was born in Epsom, Surrey, the youngest of three sons of the solicitor Charles Alfred Piper and his wife Mary Ellen Matthews. Charles Alfred Piper's father, Charles Christmas Piper, had taken over the family bootmaking business, and was also a partner in a printing and stationery company. During Piper's childhood, Epsom was still largely countryside. He went exploring on his bicycle and drew and painted pictures of old churches and monuments on the way. He started making guide books complete with pictures and information at a young age. Piper's brothers both served in the First World War and one of them was killed at Ypres in 1915.

John Piper attended Epsom College from 1919. He did not like the college but found refuge in art. When he left Epsom College in 1922, Piper published a book of poetry and wanted to study to become an artist. However, his father disagreed and insisted he join the family law firm, Piper, Smith & Piper in Westminster. Piper worked beside his father in London for three years, and took articles, but refused the offer of a partnership in the firm. This refusal cost Piper his inheritance but left him free to attend Richmond School of Art. At Richmond, the artist Raymond Coxon prepared Piper for the entrance exams for the Royal College of Art, which he entered in 1928. While studying at Richmond, Piper met Eileen Holding, a fellow student, whom he married in August 1929.

=== 1930s ===
Piper disliked the regime at the Royal College of Art and left in December 1929. Piper and his wife lived in Hammersmith and held a joint exhibition of their artworks at Heal's in London in 1931. Piper also wrote art and music reviews for several papers and magazines, notably The Nation and Athenaeum. One such review, of the artist Edward Wadsworth's work, led to an invitation from Ben Nicholson for Piper to join the Seven and Five Society of modern artists. In the following years Piper was involved in a wide variety of projects in several different media. As well as abstract paintings, he produced collages, often with the English landscape or seaside as the subject. He drew a series on Welsh nonconformist chapels, produced articles on English typography and made arts programmes for the BBC. He experimented with placing constructions of dowelling rods over the surface of his canvases and with using mixtures of sand and paint.

With Myfanwy Evans, Piper founded the contemporary art journal Axis in January 1935. As the art critic for The Listener, through working on Axis and by his membership of the London Group and the Seven and Five Society, Piper was at the forefront of the modernist movement in Britain throughout the 1930s. In 1935 Piper and Evans began documenting Early English sculptures in British churches. Piper believed that Anglo-Saxon and Romanesque sculptures, as a popular art form, had parallels with contemporary art. Through Evans, Piper met John Betjeman in 1937 and Betjeman asked Piper to work on the Shell Guides he was editing. Piper wrote and illustrated the guide to Oxfordshire, focusing on rural churches. In March 1938 Stephen Spender asked Piper to design the sets for his production of Trial of a Judge. Piper's first one-man show in May 1938 included abstract paintings, collage landscapes and more conventional landscapes. His second in March 1940 at the Leicester Galleries, featuring several pictures of derelict ruins, was a sell-out.

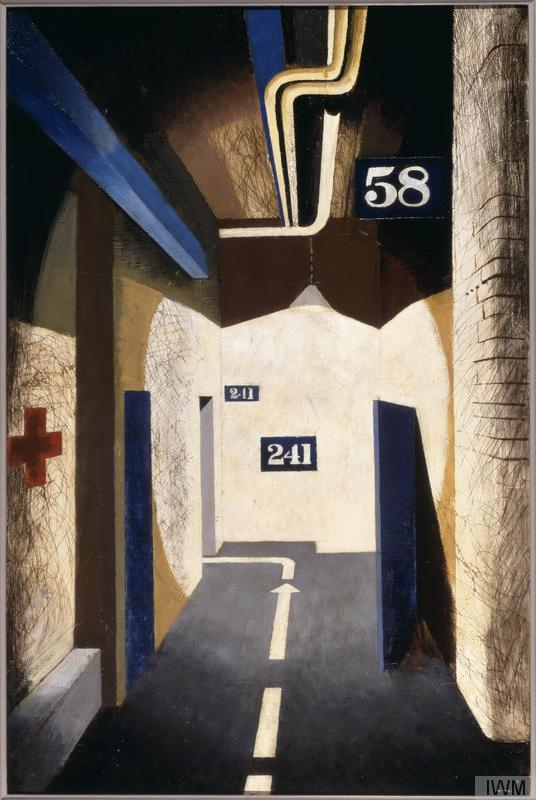
Passage to the Control-room at South West Regional Headquarters, Bristol, 1940, Imperial War Museum, London

Piper had first met Myfanwy Evans in 1934 and early the next year when his wife Eileen left him for another artist, Piper and Evans moved into an abandoned farmhouse at Fawley Bottom in the Chilterns near Henley-on-Thames. The farmhouse had no mains electricity, no mains water and no telephone connection. They married in 1937. They gradually converted the farm's outbuildings to studios for their artworks, but it was not until the 1960s that they could afford to modernise the property.

=== World War II ===
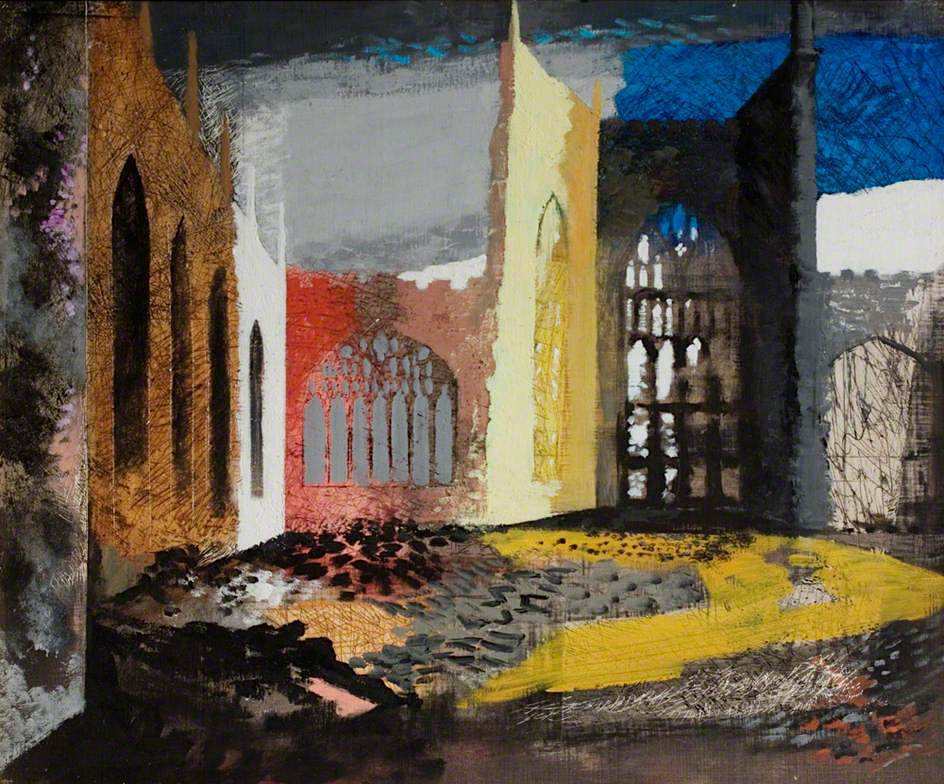
Interior of Coventry Cathedral, 15 November 1940, 1940, Herbert Art Gallery and Museum, Coventry

At the start of the Second World War, Piper volunteered to work interpreting aerial reconnaissance photographs for the Royal Air Force, but was persuaded by Sir Kenneth Clark to work as an official war artist for the War Artists' Advisory Committee (WAAC), which he did from 1940 to 1944 on short-term contracts. Piper was one of only two artists, the other being Meredith Frampton, commissioned to paint inside Air Raid Precaution (ARP) control rooms. Early in 1940 Piper was secretly taken to the ARP underground centre in Bristol, where he painted two pictures.

In November 1940 Piper persuaded the WAAC committee that he should be allowed to concentrate on painting bombed churches. This may have reflected his pre-war conversion to the Anglican faith as much as his previous interest in depicting derelict architectural ruins. The terms of this commission meant Piper would be visiting bombed cities, and other sites, as soon as possible after an air raid: often "the following morning, before the clearing up". Hence he arrived in Coventry the morning after the Coventry Blitz air raid of 14 November 1940 that resulted in 1000 casualties and the destruction of the medieval Coventry Cathedral. Piper made drawings of the cathedral and other gutted churches in the city which he subsequently worked up into oil paintings in his studio. Piper's first painting of the bombed cathedral, Interior of Coventry Cathedral, now exhibited at the Herbert Art Gallery, was described by Jeffery Daniels in The Times as "all the more poignant for the exclusion of a human element". Piper's depiction of the east end of the cathedral was printed as a post-card during the war and sold well. In 1962 the same image was used on the cover of the official souvenir guide to the cathedral.

After the bombing raids of 24 November 1940 on Bristol, Piper arrived in the city a day, or possibly two, later. Piper only spent a few hours in the city, but his sketches resulted, by January 1941, in three oil paintings of ruined churches: St Mary-le-Port, Bristol, The Temple Church and The Church of the Holy Nativity. Piper also painted bombed churches and other buildings in London and Newport Pagnell, and also spent a week painting in Bath after the Bath Blitz air raids in April 1942. During the summer of 1941, Piper featured in a group exhibition with Henry Moore and Graham Sutherland at Temple Newsam in Leeds. The show was a great success, attracting some 52,000 visitors before touring to other English towns and cities.

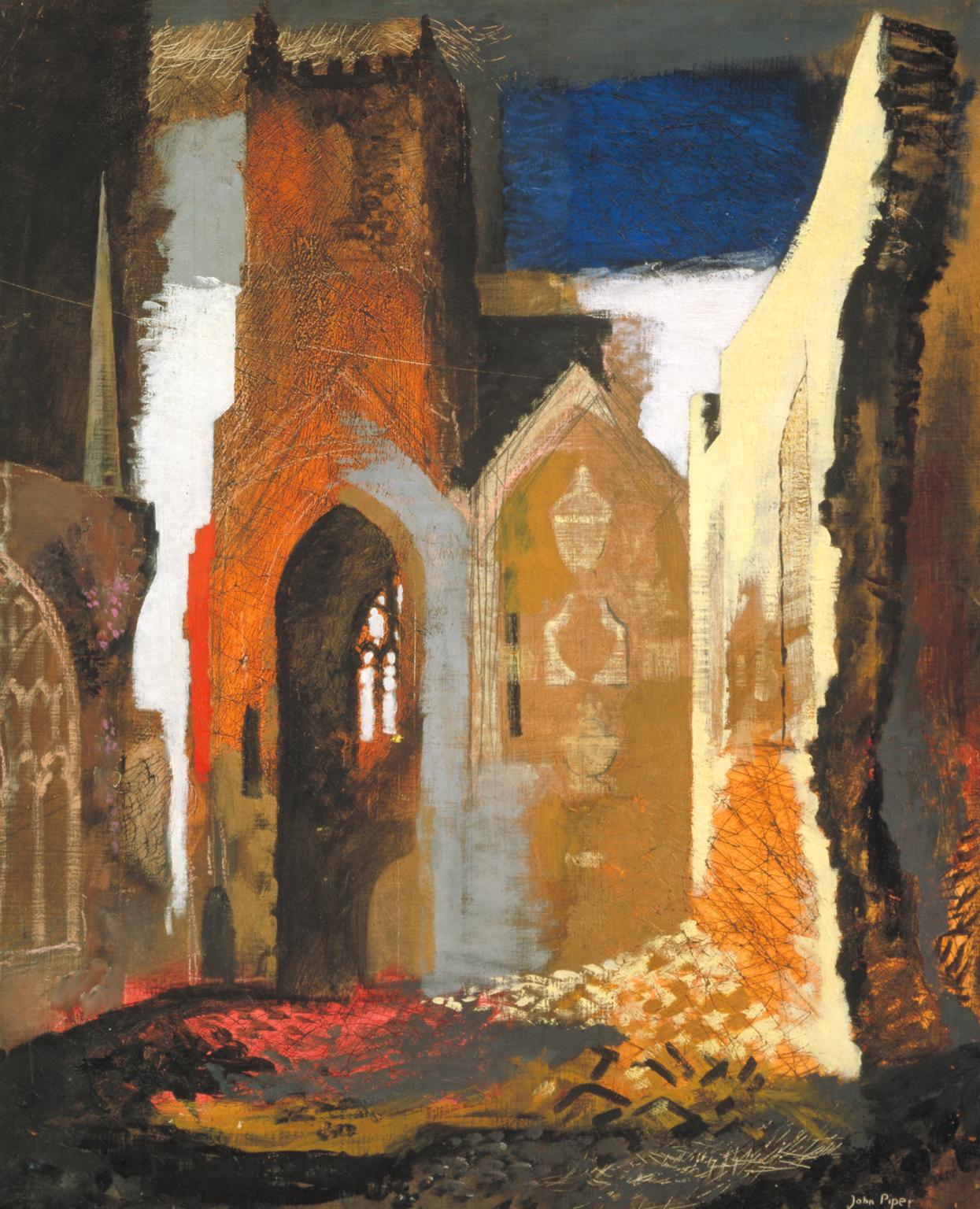
St Mary le Port, Bristol, 1940, Tate Collection

In 1943, the WAAC commissioned Piper to go to the disused slate mine at Blaenau Ffestiniog where the paintings from the National Gallery had been evacuated for safety during the Blitz. Piper found conditions in the underground quarry too difficult to work in but did paint some landscapes in the immediate area. He also toured North Wales by bicycle, cycling and climbing to photograph and sketch buildings and views in Harlech, in the Vale of Ffestiniog, on Cader Idris and on Aran Fawddwy. Piper had previously visited Snowdonia in 1939, 1940 and 1941, and often returned there after the war.

Piper was also commissioned by the WAAC to record a series of experiments on bomb shelter designs and land reclamation work. Alongside Vivian Pitchforth, he painted the bombed interior of the House of Commons. In July 1944 the WAAC appointed Piper to the full-time artist post vacated by John Platt at the Ministry of War Transport. In this role Piper painted rail and marine transport scenes in Cardiff, Bristol, Southampton and other south-coast locations. Earlier in the war, he had also painted at the locomotive works in Swindon.

Throughout the war Piper also undertook work for the Recording Britain project, initiated by Kenneth Clark, to paint historic sites thought to be at risk from bombing or neglect. He also undertook some private commissions during the war. Viscount Ridley commissioned him to produce a series of watercolours of Blagdon Hall and this led to a commission from the Royal Family for a series of watercolours of Windsor Castle and Windsor Great Park, which Piper completed by March 1942. The King, George VI was unimpressed with the dark tone of the pictures and commented, "You seem to have very bad luck with your weather, Mr Piper".

Sir Osbert Sitwell invited Piper to Renishaw Hall to paint the house and illustrate an autobiography he was writing. Piper made the first of many visits to the estate in 1942. The family retain 70 of his pictures and there is a display at the hall. Piper painted a similar series at Knole House for Edward Sackville-West. In 1943, Piper received the first of several poster commissions from Ealing Studios. His draft poster for the film The Bells Go Down featured a view of St Paul's Cathedral seen among monumental ruins.

=== Stained glass work ===
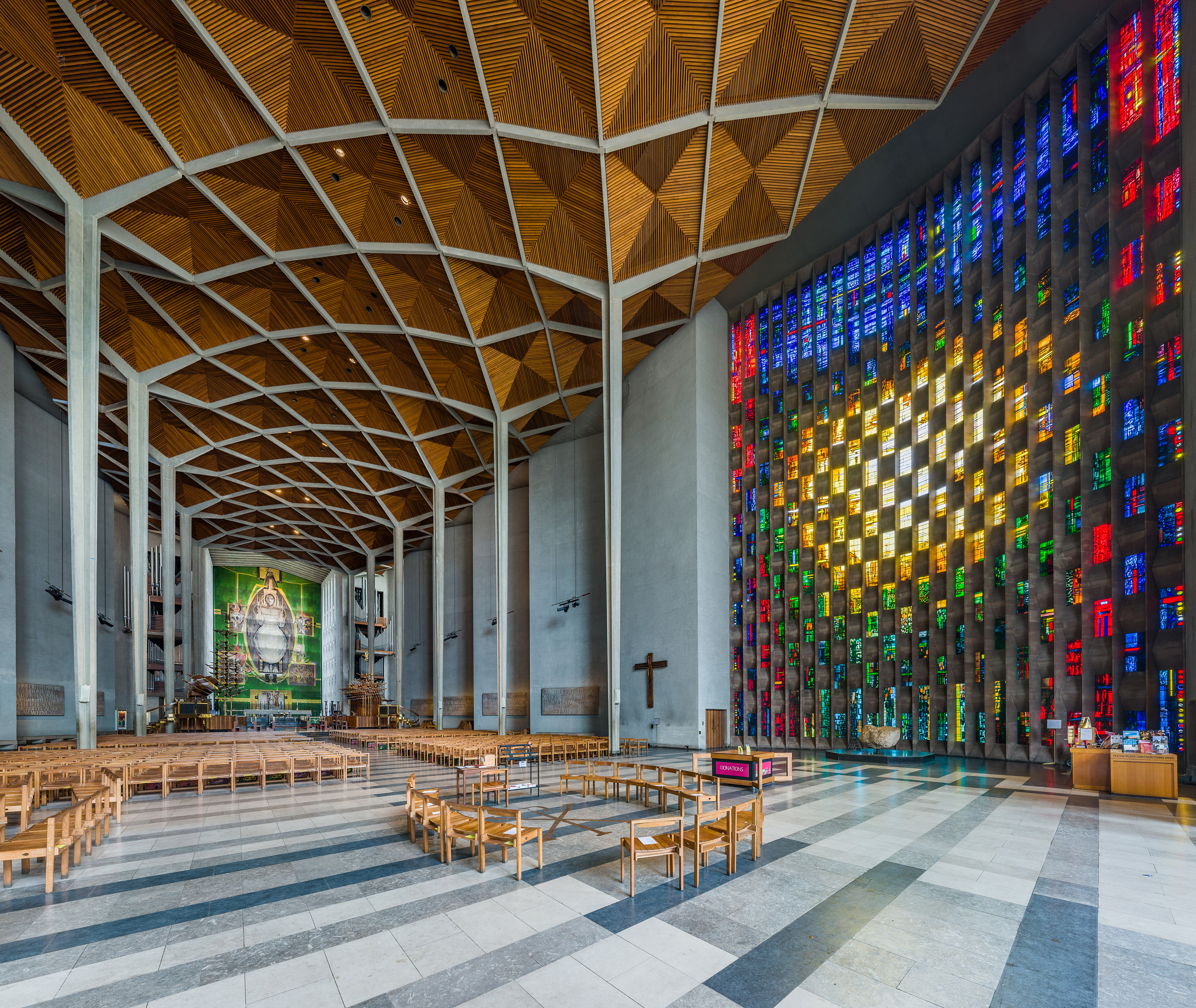
Interior of Coventry Cathedral, showing Piper's baptistry window, 1955–1962

From the mid-1950s Piper began designing for stained glass. It would become a major, though far from exclusive, avenue of artistic expression during the second half of his career, one that would result in arguably his best known work, the baptistry window for Coventry Cathedral.

The opportunity arose through Piper's association with John Betjeman. On learning of Oundle School's intention to engage an artist to design and manufacture three windows for the apse of the school's chapel, Betjeman recommended Piper for the job, this despite his never having worked in the medium before. Piper produced designs but wanted a trial piece made up in glass prior to accepting the commission. Through Betjeman, Piper was introduced to the glassmaker Patrick Reyntiens, who undertook to making the trial piece, a panel depicting the heads of two kings. Pleased with the outcome, Piper both accepted the commission and engaged Reyntiens to realise his designs in glass. Completed between 1953 and 1956, the nine lights for the chapel at Oundle, three to each window, feature individual images of Christ as King and Saviour of the World. Their success set a pattern for a partnership that would last into the 1980s.

Despite Piper being more than 20 years' senior to Reyntiens, and by far the more established artist, in general their partnership was a reciprocal and collaborative one. Though always structured by Piper’s origination of an overall design, they resisted a hierarchical model in which artist was senior to craftsman in favour of interdependent creative exchange. This allowed Reyntiens significant interpretative agency, which was particularly true for large-scale and experimental commissions, such as the Crown of Glass for Liverpool Metropolitan Cathedral.

The initial success of the Oundle windows led directly to Basil Spence commissioning Piper to design the stained glass window for the baptistry of the rebuilt Coventry Cathedral. Spence's vision for the new cathedral required that it be filled with the best examples of modern British art, like a "casket of jewels". Between 1955 and 1962, in close collaboration with Spence, Piper and Reyntiens produced a highly-original curtain of glass and reinforced concrete that climbs the full 26 metre height of the bowed baptistry wall. Architecturally integral to the building, it comprises 198 panes of glass, each combining to form an abstract design in a spectrum of colours ranging from white to deep blue. It remains Piper's single most celebrated work of art.

Piper's depiction of Jesus at Emmaus was installed above the high altar at Llandaff Cathedral in Cardiff in 1962, a commission received while working on the Coventry window. Commissions followed throughout the 1960s, 1970s and 1980s, primarily from patrons of memorial windows in parish churches across England. At St Andrew's Church, Plymouth, Piper and Reyntiens were responsible for six windows, each individual and all installed between 1957 and 1968.

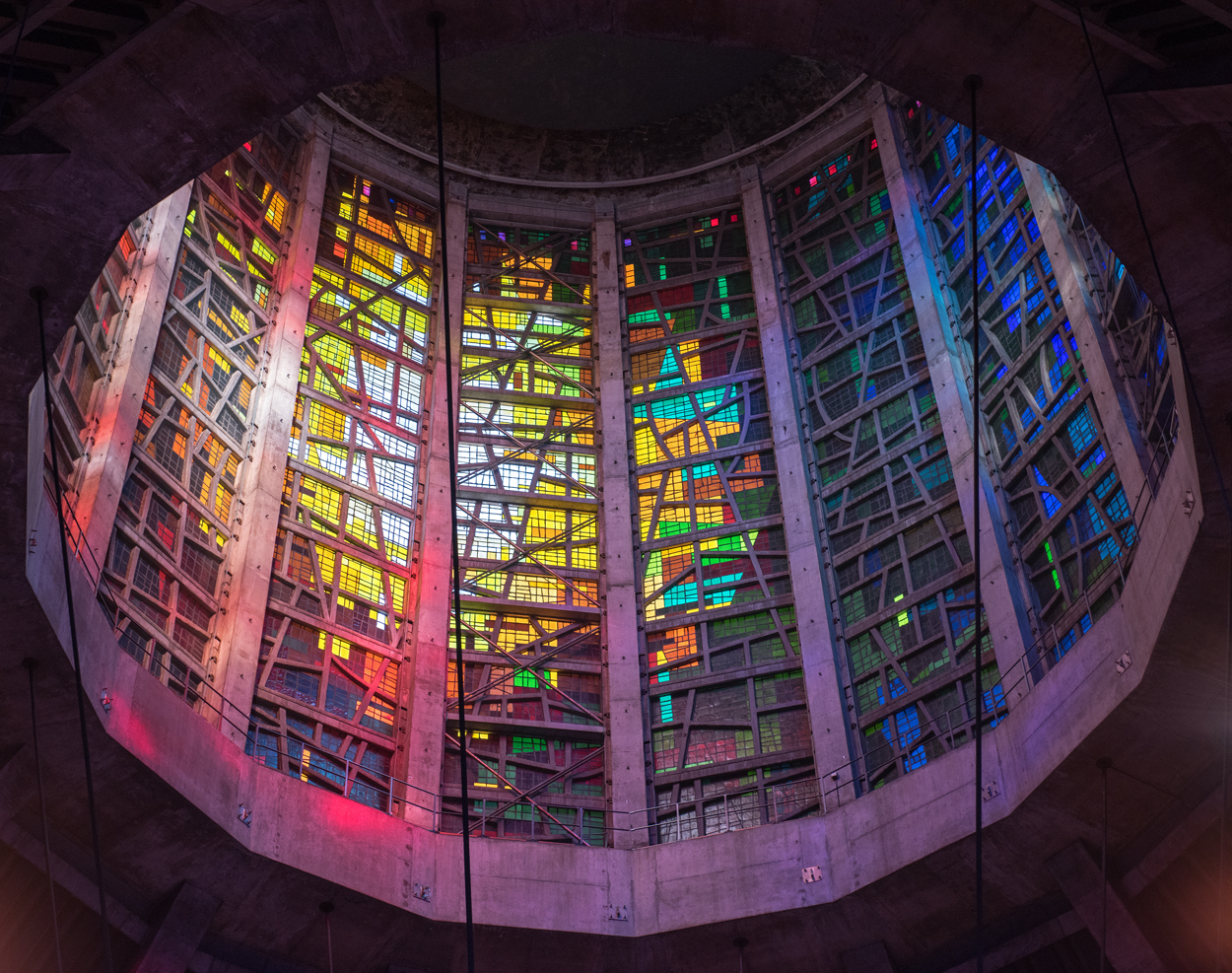
Crown of Glass, Liverpool Metropolitan Cathedral, 1965–67

Liverpool Metropolitan Cathedral, built between 1962 and 1967 by the architect Frederick Gibberd features, as an integral part of its design, an innovative stained glass lantern. Known as the Crown of Glass this was designed and manufactured by Piper and Reyntiens. The lantern panels were cemented together with epoxy resin within thin concrete ribs, a technique invented for the job. The idea for the design came from Reyntiens, who was inspired by a description from Dante's Paradiso of the Holy Trinity as "three great eyes of different colours each one winking at the other."

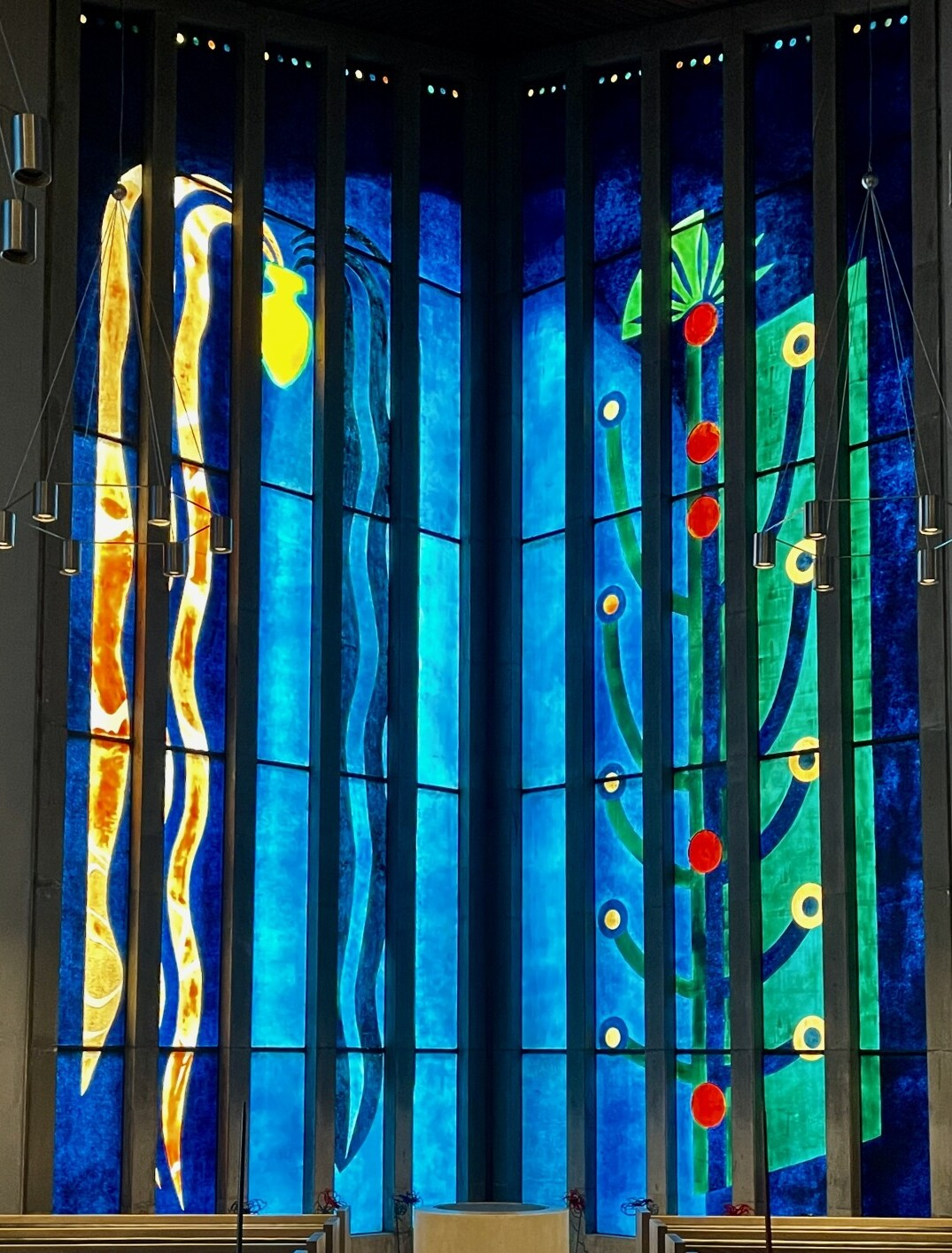
Church of All Saints, Clifton, Bristol, 1967

One of Piper's most original window commissions is not actually fabricated from glass at all. At the Church of All Saints, Clifton in Bristol, in 1967, Piper created windows depicting the Tree of Life, the River of Life and Creation from fiberglass panels specially created by Gillespie Associates in Farnham to Piper's specification. Once in situ, Piper poured resins onto the panels creating large coloured sections without the use of ‘leads’ used in traditional stained glass. Piper described the process as akin to painting on canvas.

As well as their work for cathedrals and parish churches, Piper also designed stained-glass windows for Eton College Chapel (1959–1964), the chapel of Nuffield College, Oxford (1960–1961), St George's Chapel, Windsor Castle (1969), and the chapel of Robinson College, Cambridge (1980). He also accepted secular commissions for stained glass. Of particular note is the abstract glazed screen produced for Arthur Sanderson's new showroom on Berners Street in London in 1960. Back lit, its purpose is to disguise the lift shafts. The screen was retained and restored when the building was converted into a hotel in 2000.

Piper's most significant overseas commission is installed in the narthex of Washington National Cathedral, a three-light window featuring the Tree of Life, a motif frequently deployed by Piper. It was unveiled in September 1974 as part of the dedication of the narthex beneath the Cathedral's south-west tower to the memory of Sir Winston Churchill. The title given to the window is The Land Is Bright, taken from the final stanza of Arthur Hugh Clough's 1849 poem, Say Not the Struggle Naught Availeth, which was quoted by Churchill in a 1941 radio broadcast.

In total, Piper designed more than 60 stained-glass window commissions. By far the majority were undertaken in partnership with Reyntiens, though in later years Piper worked with David Wasley and Joseph A Nuttgens, both of whom had trained in Reyntiens' studio. Piper's last major commission – though not his last to be manufactured and installed – was his 1984 memorial window to his former collaborator, John Betjeman in All Saints Church at Farnborough in Berkshire, a man who had played a key early role in establishing Piper as a stained glass designer.

Piper set out his ‘philosophy’ on the medium in his 1968 essay Stained Glass: Art or Anti-Art?, reflecting on the uneasy position that stained glass occupies between fine art and architectural craft. In it he questioned whether modern trends risked stripping the medium of its expressive depth. He critiqued both direct imitation of historical styles and overly abstract experimentation, arguing that either could break the relationship between stained glass and its unique architectural properties of light, space, and setting. Piper instead advocated for a contextual approach to commissions that balanced contemporary design and technical innovation with the distinctive and site-specific elements of the medium. Piper also emphasised the importance of maintaining separation between the artist-designer and the craftsman-manufacturer, seeing this distinction as necessary for preserving both creative integrity and technical excellence. This of course aligned seamlessly with Piper’s own collaborative working relationship with Reyntiens and has been read as a strategic positioning of his own reputation in relation to that of designer-maker contemporaries such as John Hayward, Keith New and Harry Stammers.

=== Later life ===
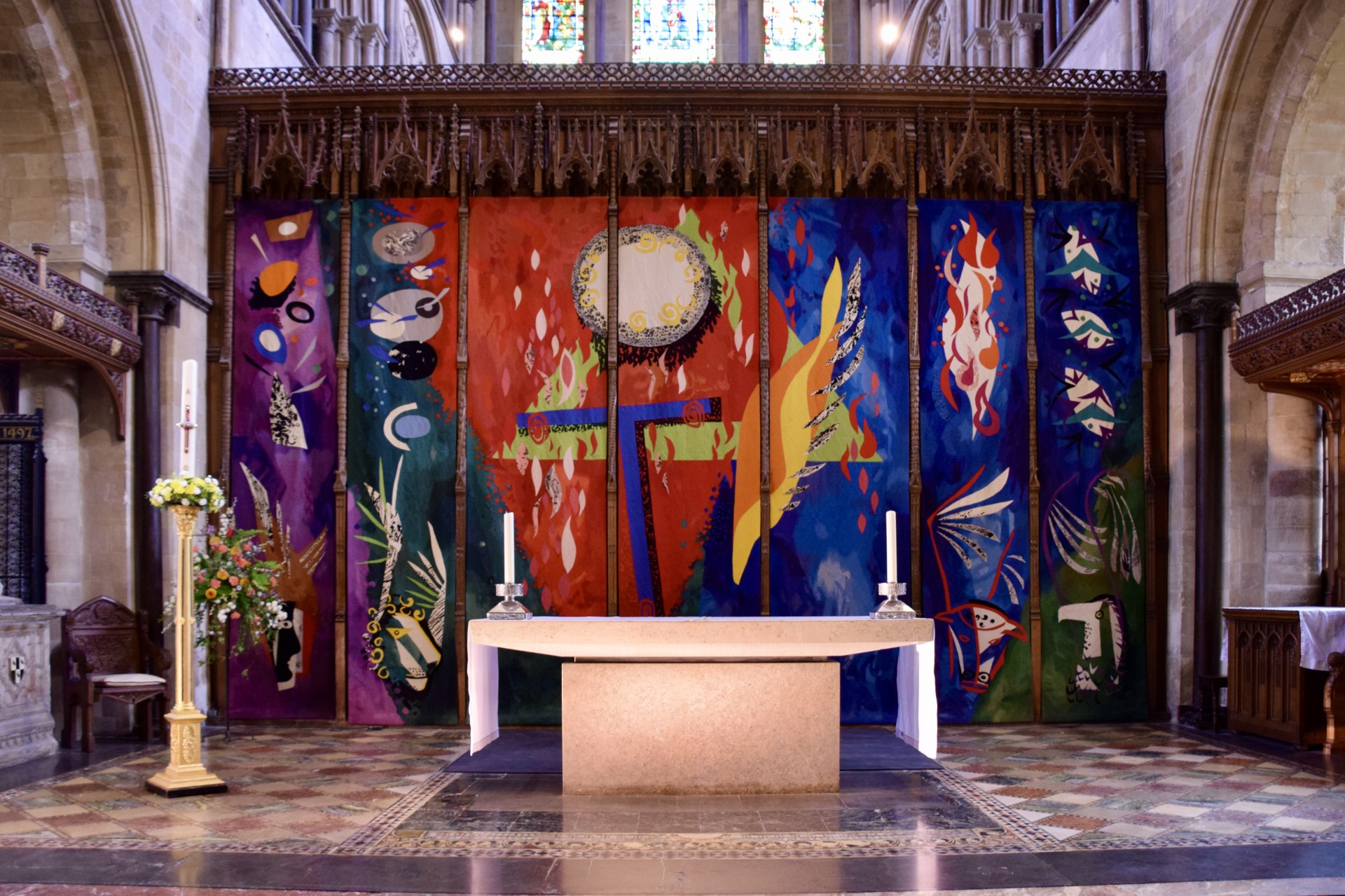
High altar tapestry, 1966, Chichester Cathedral

Piper made working visits to south Wales in both 1936 and 1939, and from 1943 to 1951, he made an annual painting trip to Snowdonia. He did not paint in the Welsh mountains after 1951 but did visit, and painted in Aberaeron in 1954. Piper's Snowdonia paintings and drawings were exhibited in New York in September 1947 and in May 1950, on both occasions at Curt Valentin's Galerie Buchholz. The former show was Piper's first large solo show in the United States.

For the Festival of Britain in 1951, the Arts Council of Great Britain commissioned Piper to create a large mural, The Englishman's Home, which consists of 42 plywood panels and depicted dwellings ranging from cottages to castles. The mural was displayed in a large open porch on the South Bank site for the duration of the festival. Not on public display for many years, in 2022 it was announced that the Rothschild Foundation has acquired the mural for Waddesdon Manor. Later in the 1950s, Piper produced pioneering designs for furnishing fabrics for Arthur Sanderson & Sons Ltd and David Whitehead Ltd, as part of a movement to bring art and design to the masses. He also designed a number of dust jackets for books, frequently depicting both natural and architectural forms, often in a state of decay, within theatrical framing.

Piper was commissioned to design a number of large-scale mosaic works for public spaces in the early 1960s, working with Dennis M. Williams on their manufacture and installation. The first was installed in the entrance lobby of Graham Dawbarn's newly built BBC Television Centre in White City, London in 1960. Made from thousands of glost-fired ceramic tesserae, it is vibrantly colorful and entirely abstract. At the same time Piper worked on a second vivid abstract mosaic commissioned for the foyer of John Madin's newly constructed Chamber of Commerce and Industry Building in Birmingham, completed the same year. In 1961, Piper finished his mural of the Meeting at Emmaus for the east wall of the newly built St Paul's Church in Harlow New Town in Essex. All three can still be seen in situ as of 2024.

In 1962, Piper's 250 ft mural for the porte cochère of Watson House, a laboratory complex in Fulham built 1959–1961 for the North Thames Gas Board, was unveiled. Entitled "The Spirit of Energy", the mural consists of 32 fibreglass panels manufactured in partnership with Gillespie and Manzaroli Associates. They permit a contrast between opacity and translucence that allows for a closer interpretation of Piper's abstract designs in gouache than more traditional materials might. Vacated in the 1980s, Watson House lay empty for more than a decade until it was redeveloped for residential and commercial purposes in the late 1990s. It was renamed the Piper Building in honour of the artist on completion. The building and its murals were Grade II listed in 2022.

In 1966 Walter Hussey, the Dean of Chichester Cathedral, commissioned Piper to produce a tapestry to enliven the dark area around the high altar of the cathedral. Piper had designed the cope presented to Hussey when he left his previous post in 1955, and for Chichester he produced a very brightly coloured tapestry with an abstract design of the Holy Trinity flanked by the Elements and by the Evangelists. Although the tapestry received a mixed, mostly negative, reaction from the public, Piper was commissioned to create a set of clerical vestments to complement the work in 1967. A decade later, Piper provided designs for three tapestries for Hereford Cathedral depicting the Tree of Life, the Tree of Knowledge, and the Deposition. Made by artists in Namibia in 1976, they were installed in the south transept of the cathedral the following year. Also in 1976, for the Meeting House at the University of Sussex, Piper designed a large banner-like tapestry to adorn the organ loft, inspired by the university's motto ‘Be still, and know’.

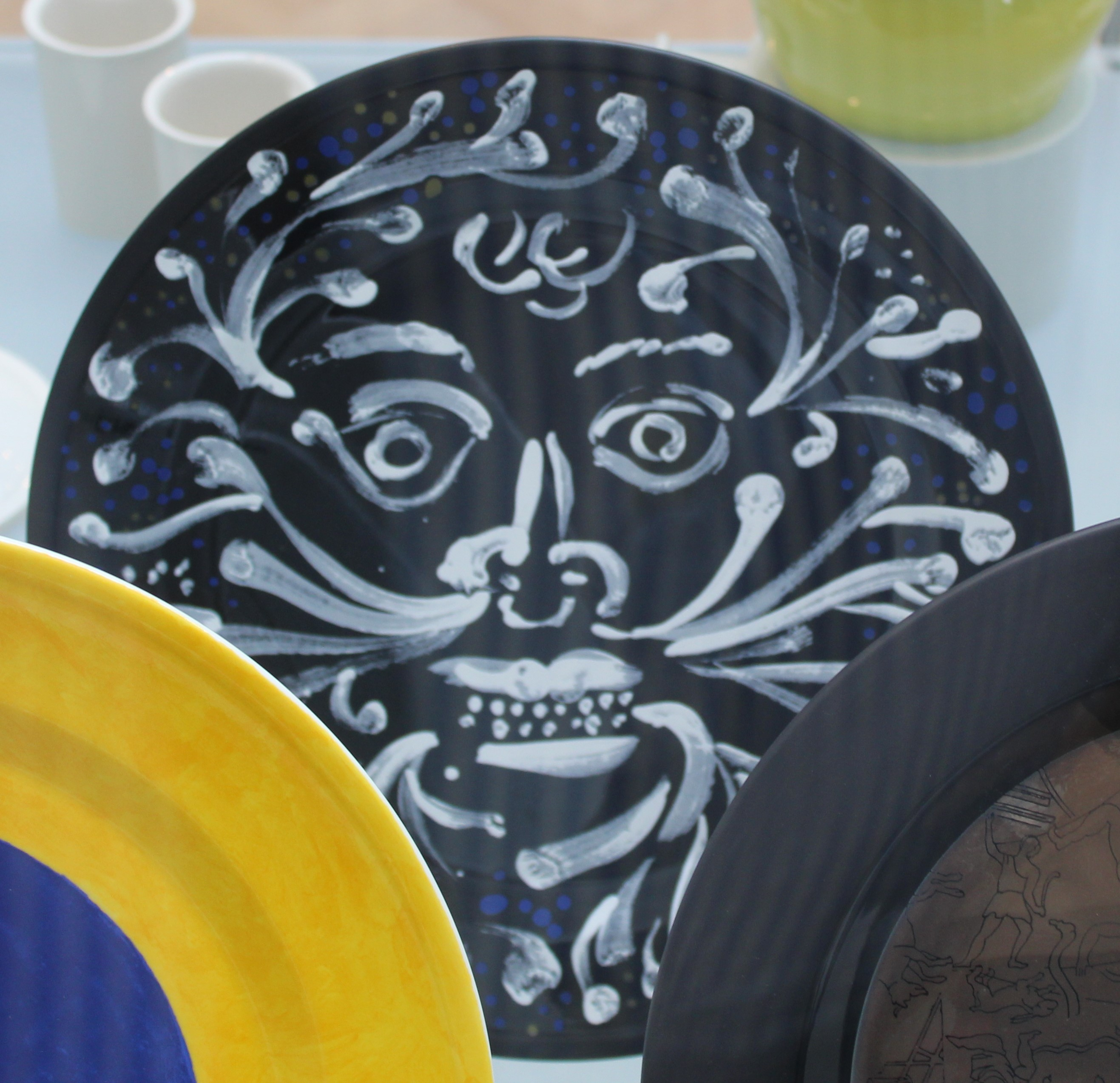
Green Man Plate for Wedgwood, 1992

In 1968, Piper began making ceramic dishes and plates. At Fawley Bottom for many years, Piper shared a studio with the potter Geoffrey Eastop, who helped him with technical aspects of the process. A number of Piper's ceramics are now in the collection of the Victoria and Albert Museum in London. One of Piper's last commissions was executed in this medium, when, in 1990, the Art Fund commissioned Piper and five other contemporary artists to design a collection of plates for Wedgwood. The other plates were designed by Peter Blake, Patrick Caulfield, Patrick Heron, Bruce McLean and Eduardo Paolozzi. Piper's plate features a recurrent image in his oeuvre, the foliate head of The Green Man.

Piper continued to write extensively on modern art in books and articles. From 1946 until 1954, Piper served as a trustee of the Tate Gallery. Throughout the 1960s and 1970s he frequently visited Pembrokeshire to paint. He was a theatre set designer, including for the Kenton Theatre in Henley-on-Thames. He designed many of the premiere productions of Benjamin Britten's operas at Glyndebourne Festival Opera, the Royal Opera House, La Fenice and the Aldeburgh Festival, as well as for some of the operas of Alun Hoddinott. Piper also designed firework displays, most notably for the Silver Jubilee of Elizabeth II in 1977.

Piper was made an Honorary Member of the Printmakers Council.

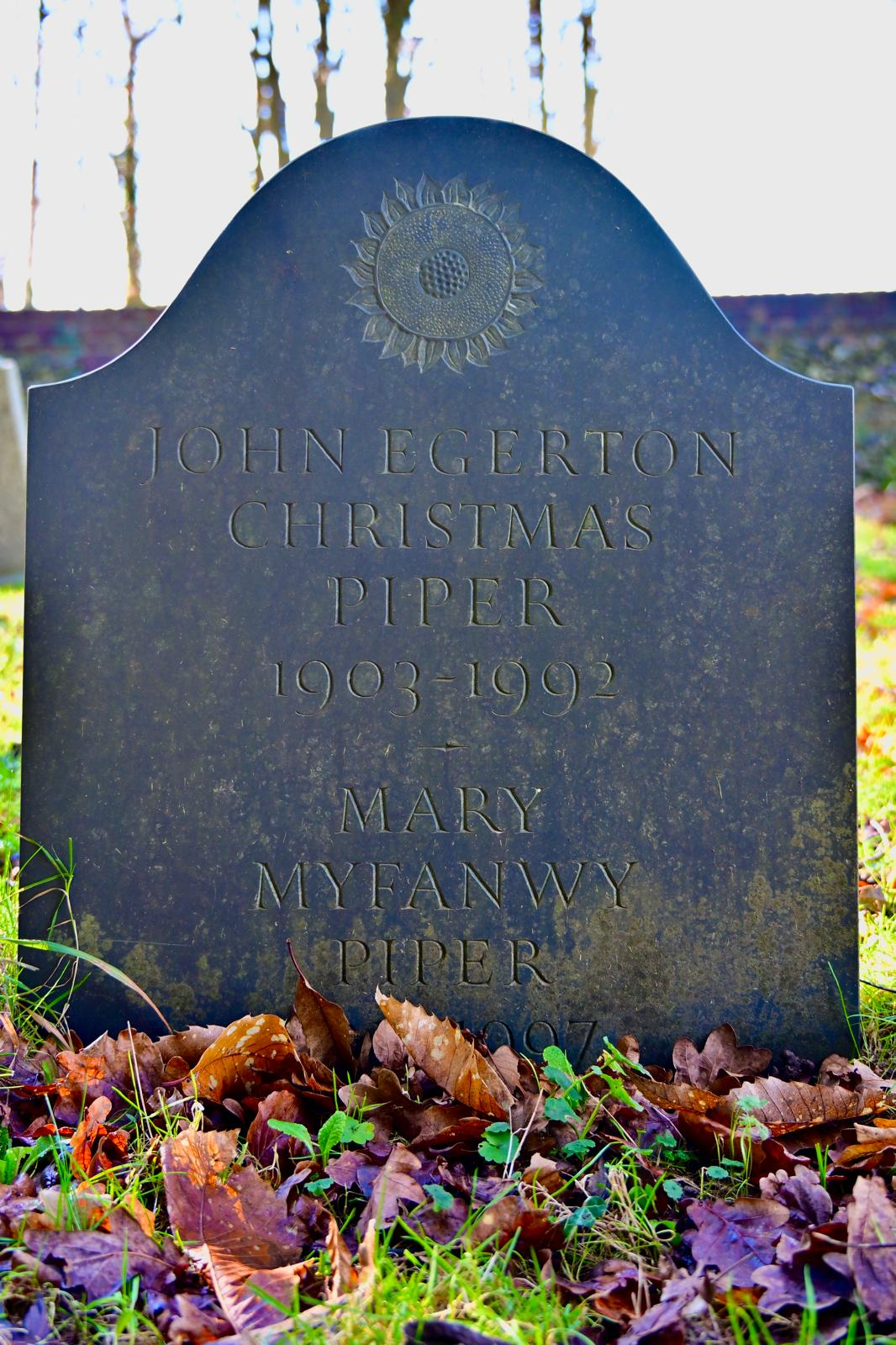
Gravestone of John and Myfanwy Piper at St Mary the Virgin's Church, Fawley

John Piper died on 28 June 1992 at his home at Fawley Bottom, Buckinghamshire, where he had lived since 1934. He was 88 years old. He was buried in the churchyard of St Mary the Virgin's Church, Fawley, where he was a parishioner. The church has a window by Piper installed in 1976. He was survived by his second wife, Myfanwy, whom Piper had married in 1937, and she was buried in the same plot upon her death in 1997. His children are Clarissa Lewis, the painter Edward Piper (deceased), Susannah Brooks and Sebastian Piper; his grandchildren include painter Luke Piper and sculptor Henry Piper.

== Legacy ==
Since 2016, the River and Rowing Museum in Henley-on-Thames has maintained a permanent gallery dedicated to the life and work of John Piper. Situated in the nearest town to Piper's home in Fawley Bottom, the gallery's collection is built around a significant gift from the Piper estate, complemented by loans from public and private collections. A biography about Piper, John Piper and Stained Glass, was published in 1997 by June Osborne in consultation with his widow.

The Tate collection holds 180 examples of Piper's work, including etchings and some earlier abstractions. Other collections holding Piper's work include the Art Institute of Chicago, Ashmolean Museum, Beaverbrook Art Gallery, Birmingham Museum & Art Gallery, Bristol Museum & Art Gallery, British Museum, Cheltenham Art Gallery and Museum, Cleveland Museum of Art, Currier Gallery of Art, Dallas Museum of Art, Fitzwilliam Museum, Glasgow Museums, Government Art Collection, The Hepworth Wakefield, Herbert Art Gallery and Museum, Hirshhorn Museum and Sculpture Garden, Hugh Lane Gallery, Imperial War Museum, Indianapolis Museum of Art, Laing Art Gallery, Leeds Art Gallery, Leicester Museum & Art Gallery, Manchester Art Gallery, Museum of London, National Galleries of Scotland, National Gallery of Ireland, National Museum Cardiff, Pallant House Gallery, Parliamentary Art Collection, Philadelphia Museum of Art, The Priseman Seabrook Collection, Reading Museum, Southampton City Art Gallery, Ulster Museum, Usher Gallery, Victoria and Albert Museum, Winnipeg Art Gallery, The Whitworth, Wiltshire Museum, Wolverhampton Art Gallery, Yale Center for British Art and York Art Gallery.

Major retrospective exhibitions of Piper's work have been held at Tate Britain (1983–84), the Dulwich Picture Gallery, the Imperial War Museum, the River and Rowing Museum, Museum of Reading and Dorchester Abbey. In 2012 an exhibition, John Piper and the Church, curated by Patricia Jordan Evans of Bohun Gallery, examined his relationship with the Church and his contribution to the development of modern art within churches. In 2016, the Pallant House Gallery mounted an exhibition entitled John Piper: The Fabric of Modernism which focused on Piper's textile designs, while 2017/ 2018 saw Tate Liverpool and Mead Gallery at Warwick Arts Centre mount a joint exhibition focusing on Piper's early career, with an emphasis on the 1930s and 1940s.

== Published works ==
- Oxfordshire, Shell Guide No. 11, 1938, (Faber & Faber).
- British Romantic Artists, 1942, (Collins), published as Volume 34 of Britain in Pictures.
- Buildings and Prospects, 1948, (London: Architectural Press), a collection of published articles.
- Romney Marsh, Illustrated and Described by John Piper, 1950, King Penguin No. 55, Penguin Books.
- Shropshire, A Shell Guide, 1951, with John Betjeman,.
- Stained Glass: Art or Anti-Art ?, 1968, booklet.
- Piper's Places: John Piper in England and Wales, 1983, with Richard Ingrams,(London: Chatto & Windus, The Hogarth Press) (ISBN 0-7011-2550-0).

== Gallery ==
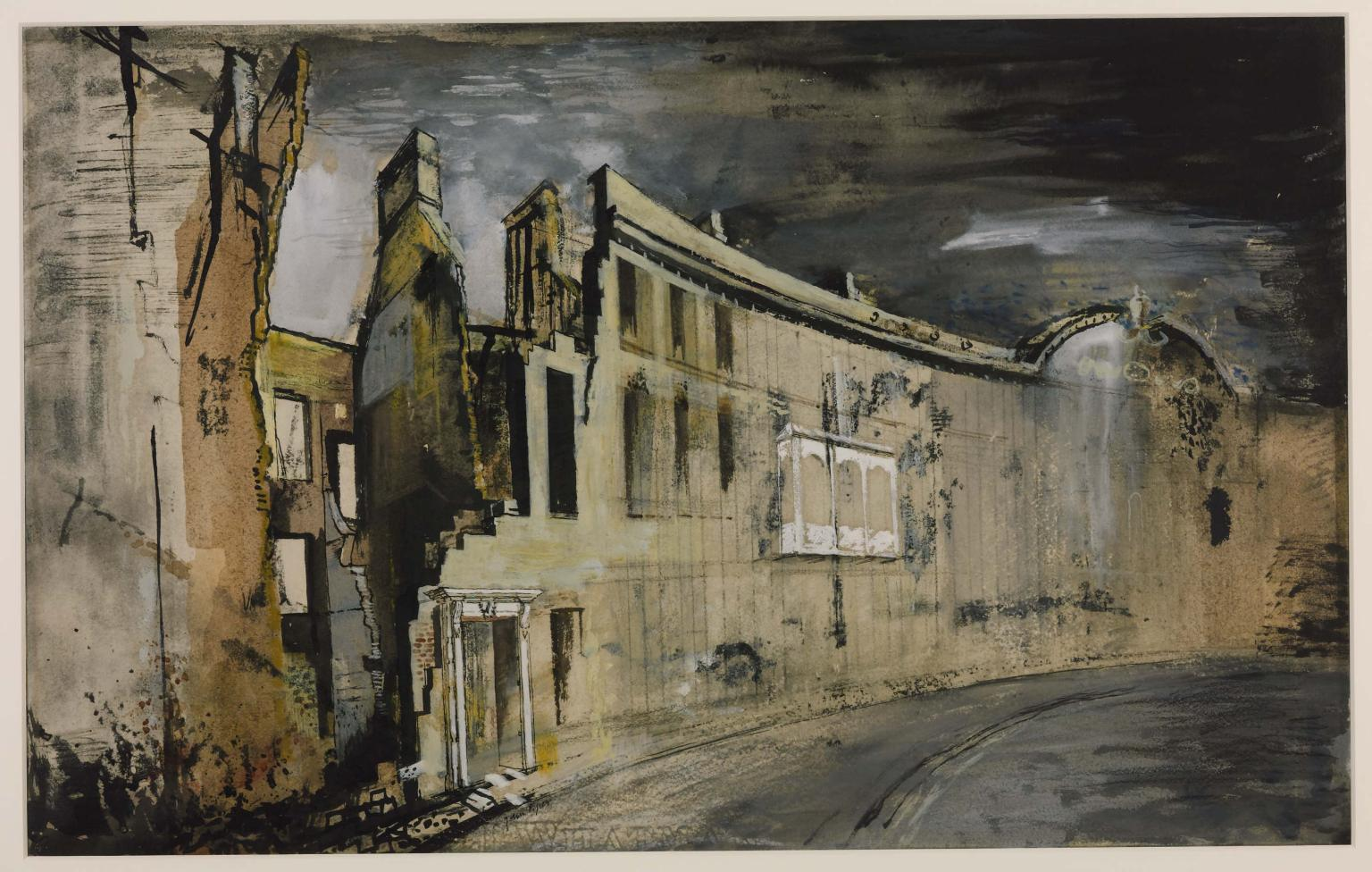
Somerset Place, Bath, 1942, Tate Collection

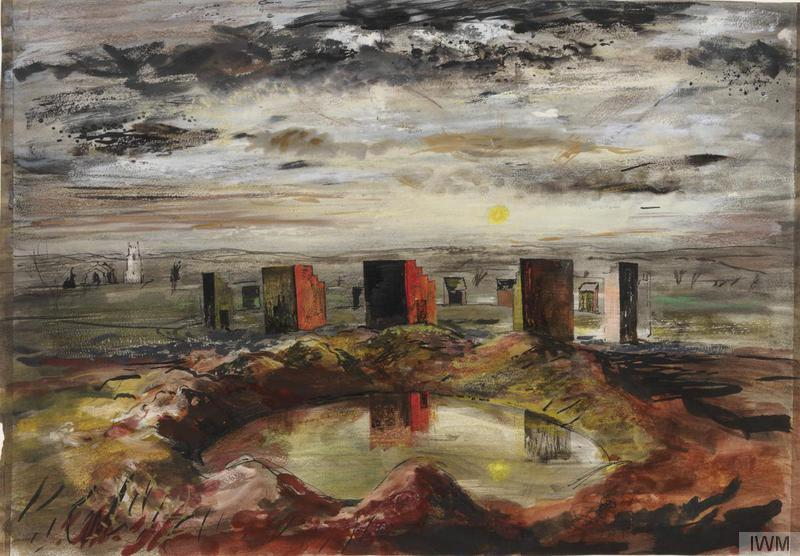
Shelter Experiments, near Woburn, Bedfordshire, 1943, Imperial War Museum, London

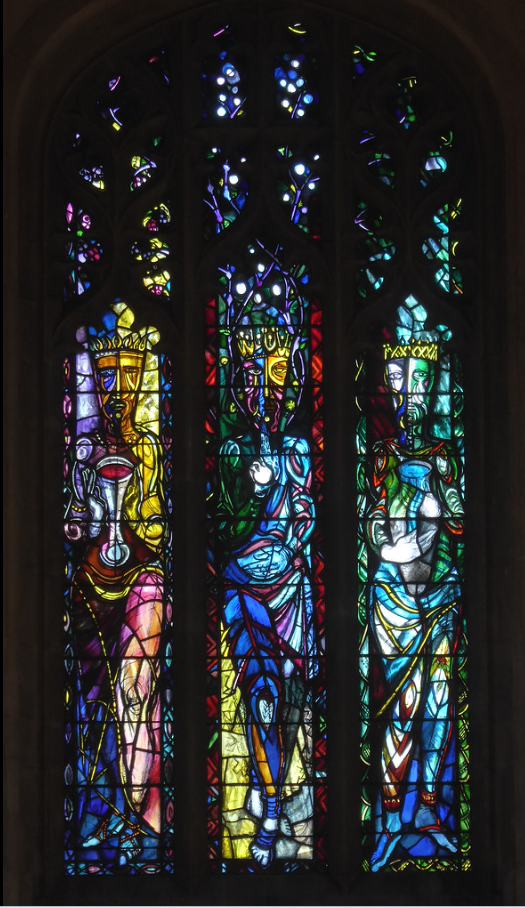
Oundle School Chapel, Oundle, Northamptonshire, 1953–1956

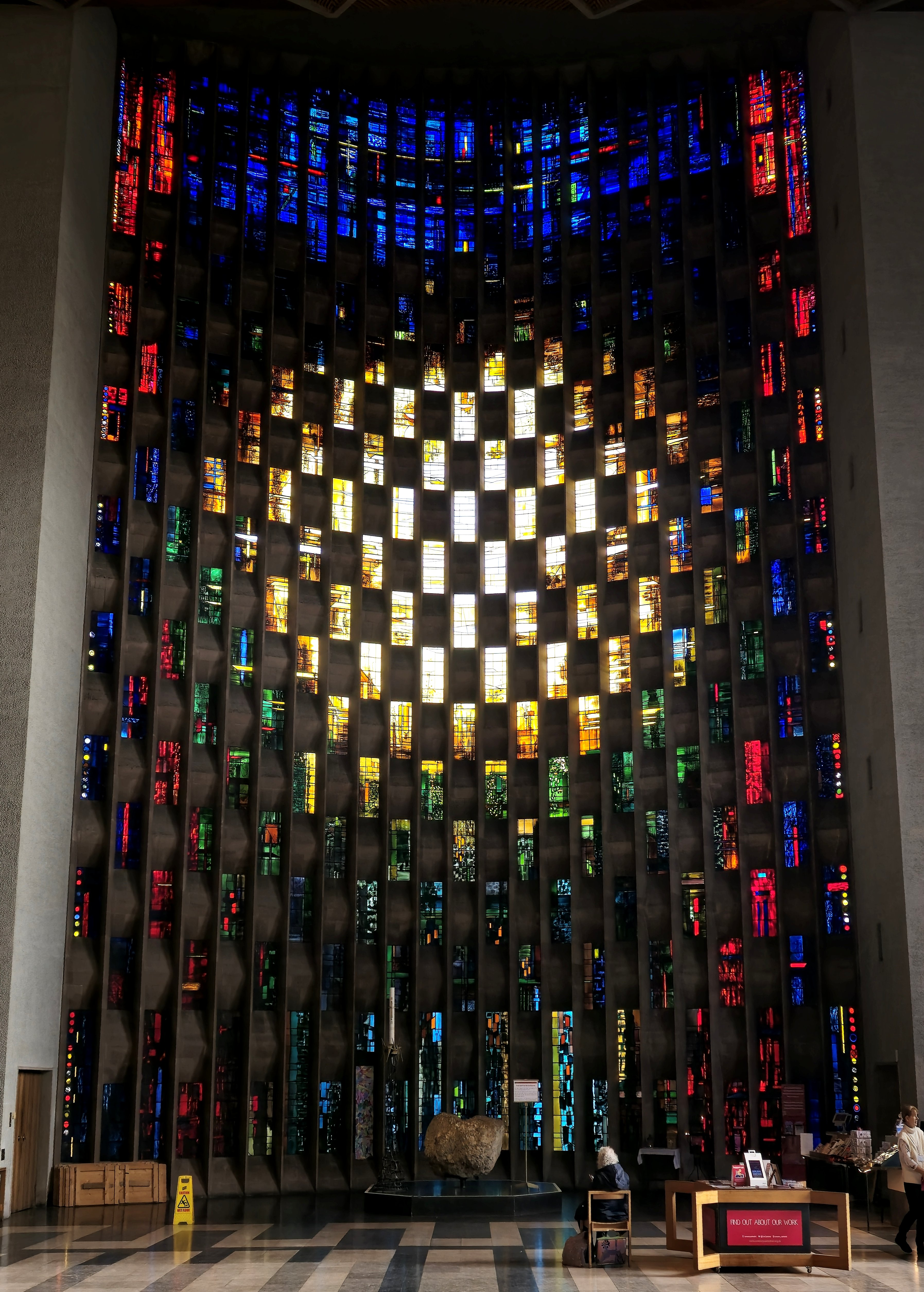
Baptistry window, Coventry Cathedral, 1955–1962

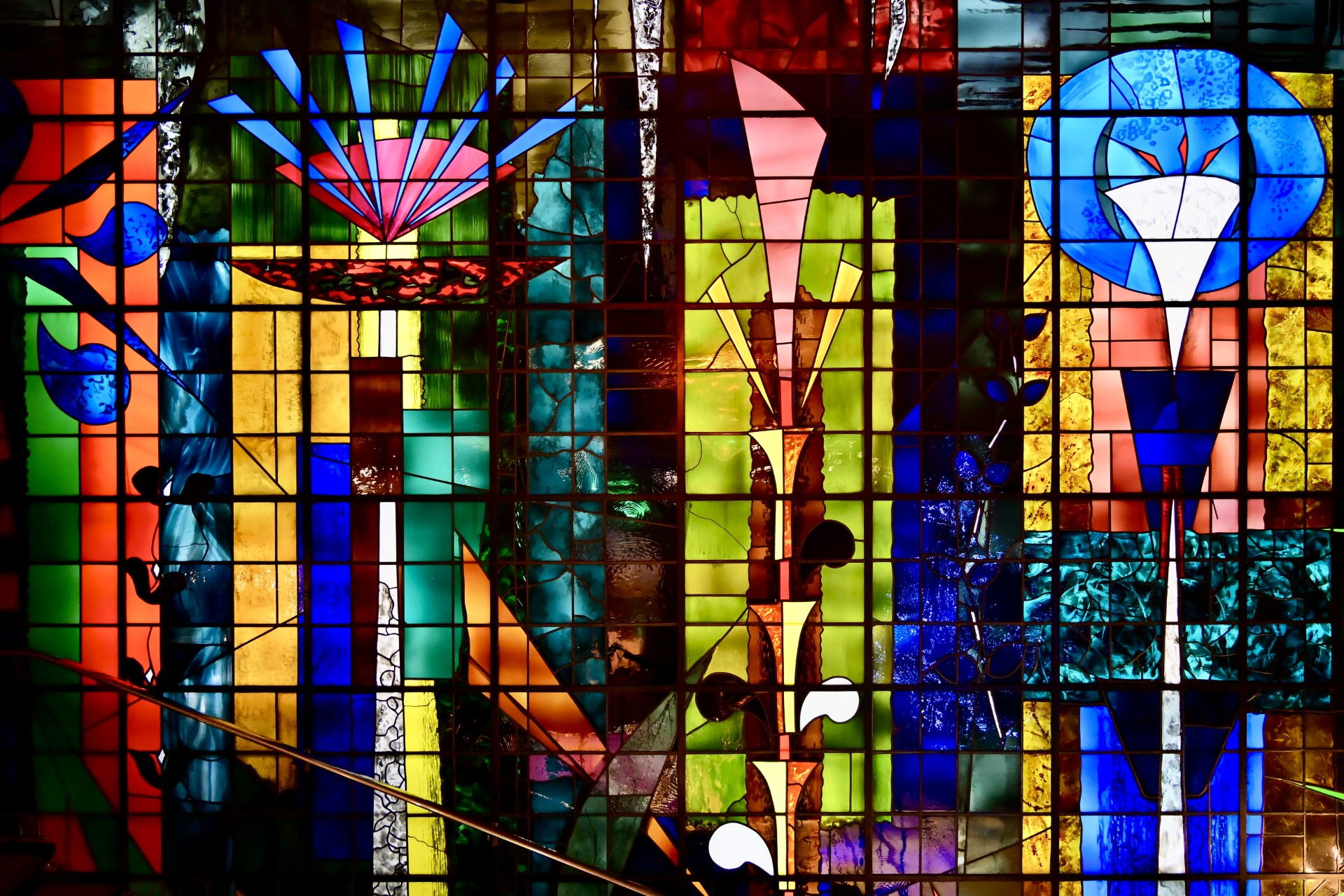
Sanderson Hotel, London, 1959–1960

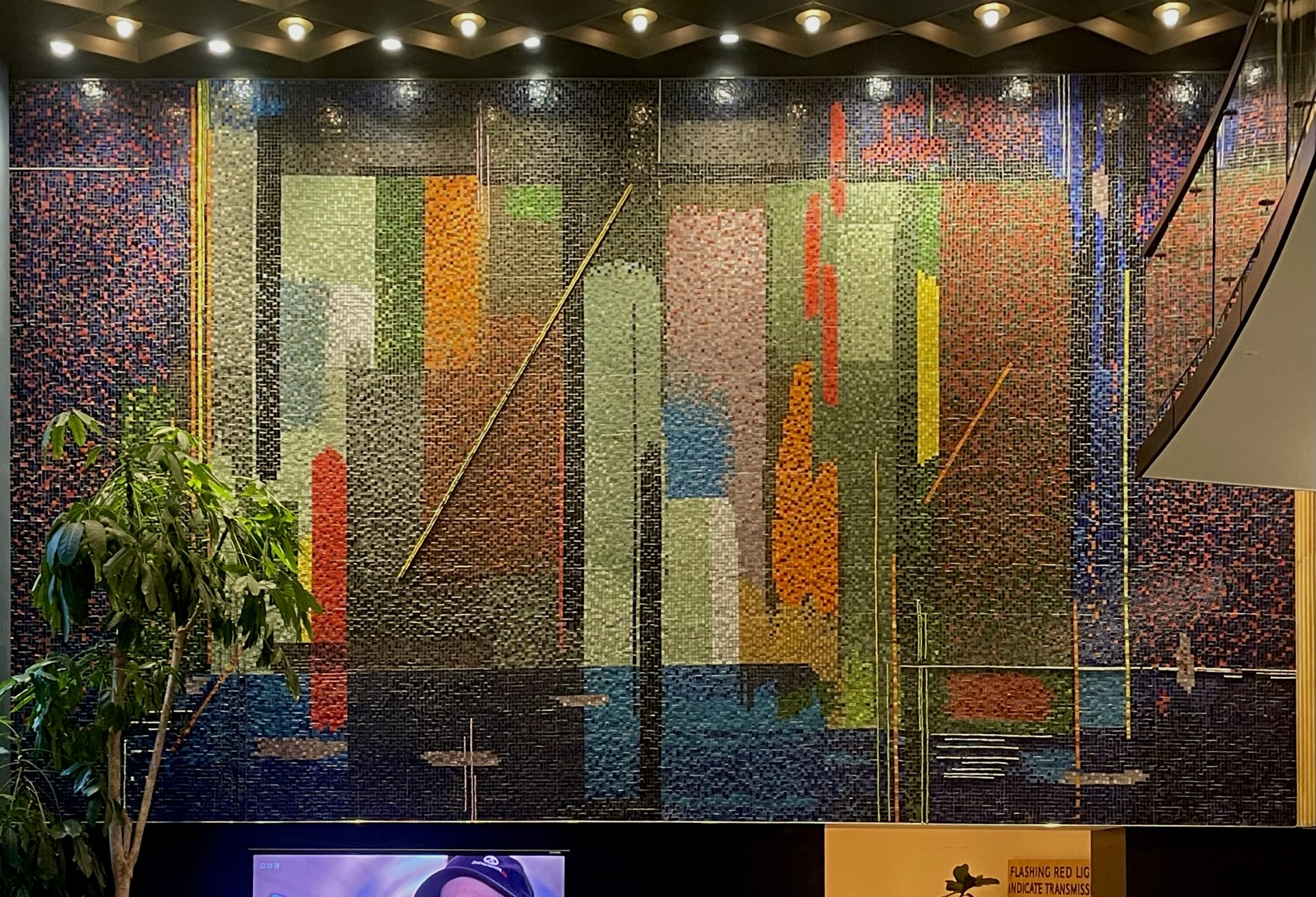
Lobby mosaic, 1960, BBC Television Centre

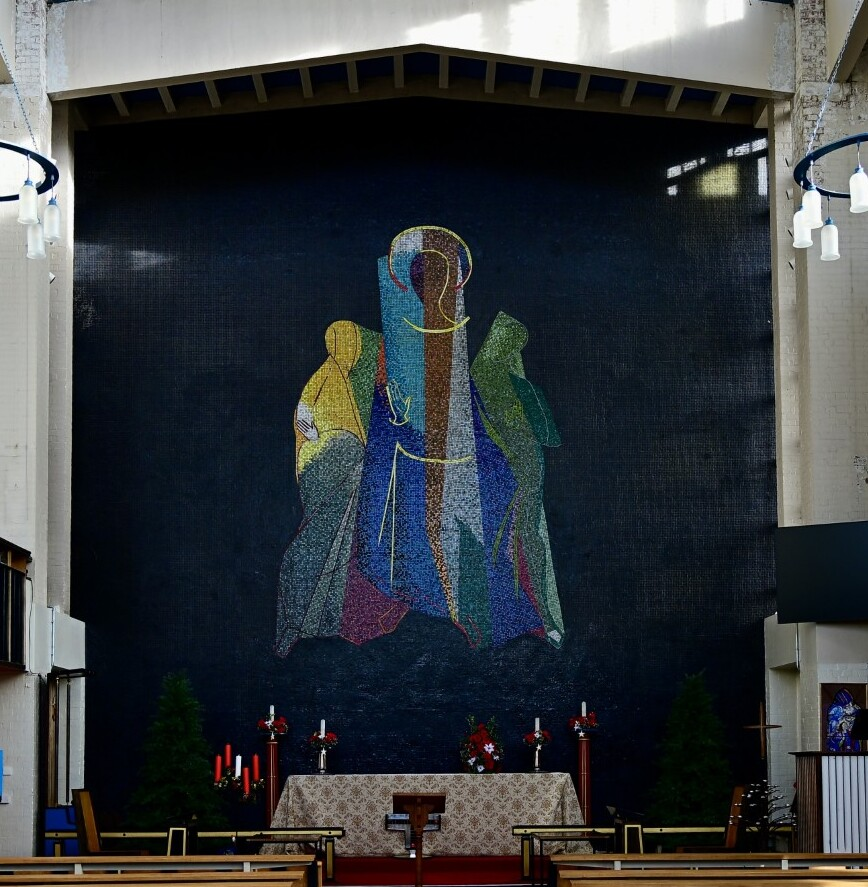
Meeting at Emmaus mosaic, 1961, St Paul's Church, Harlow

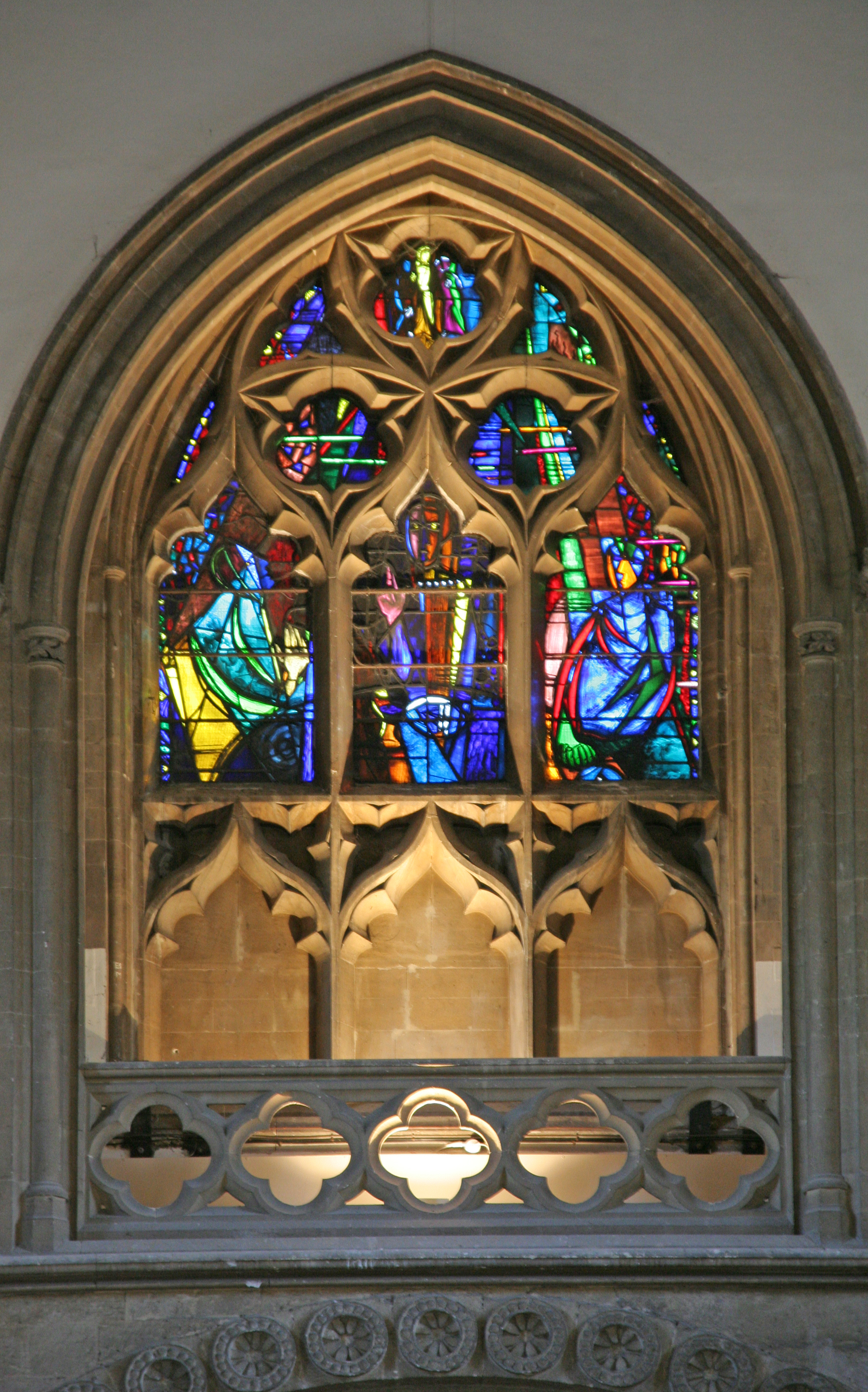
Llandaff Cathedral, Cardiff, 1961–1962

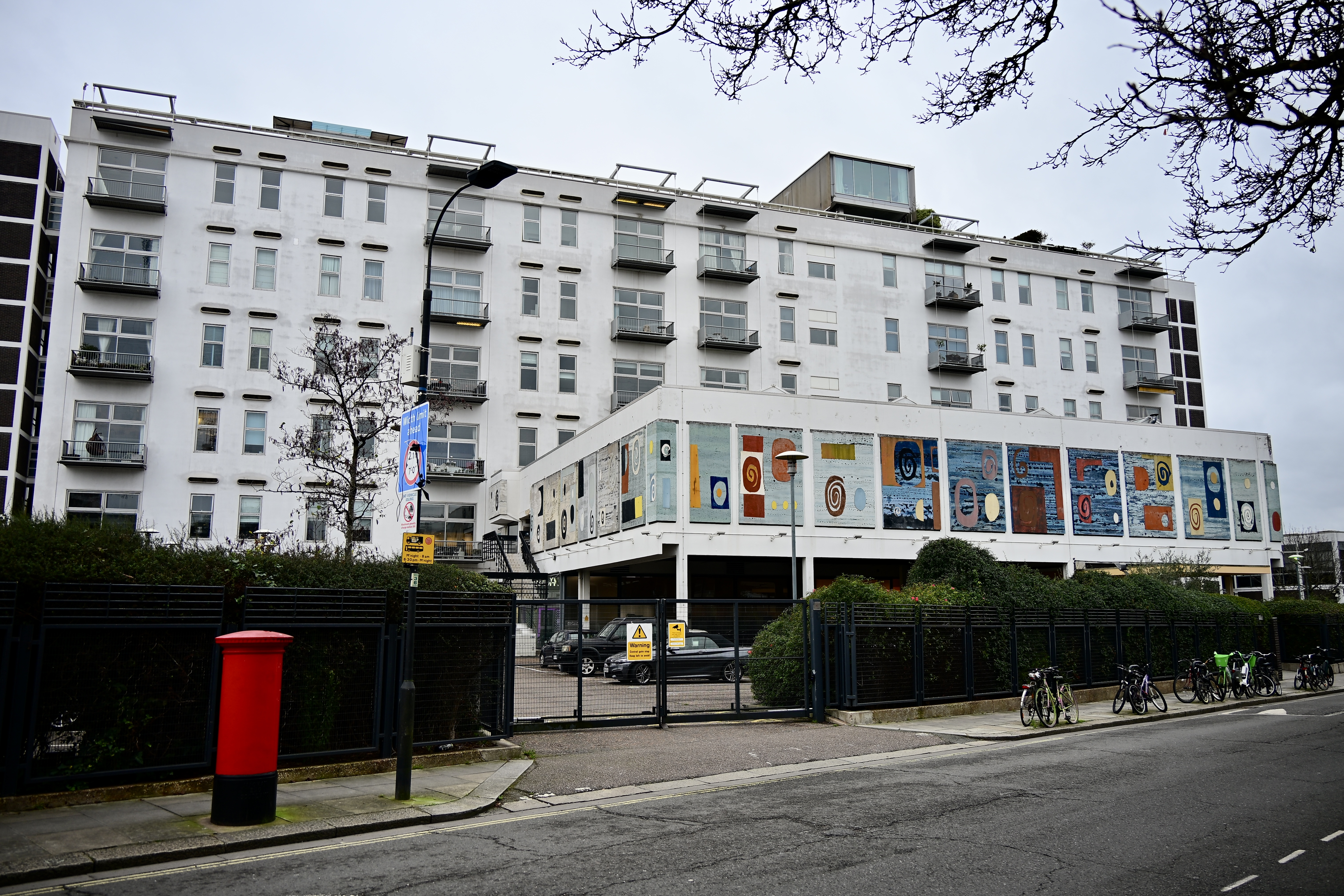
Spirit of Energy murals, 1962, The Piper Building, Fulham

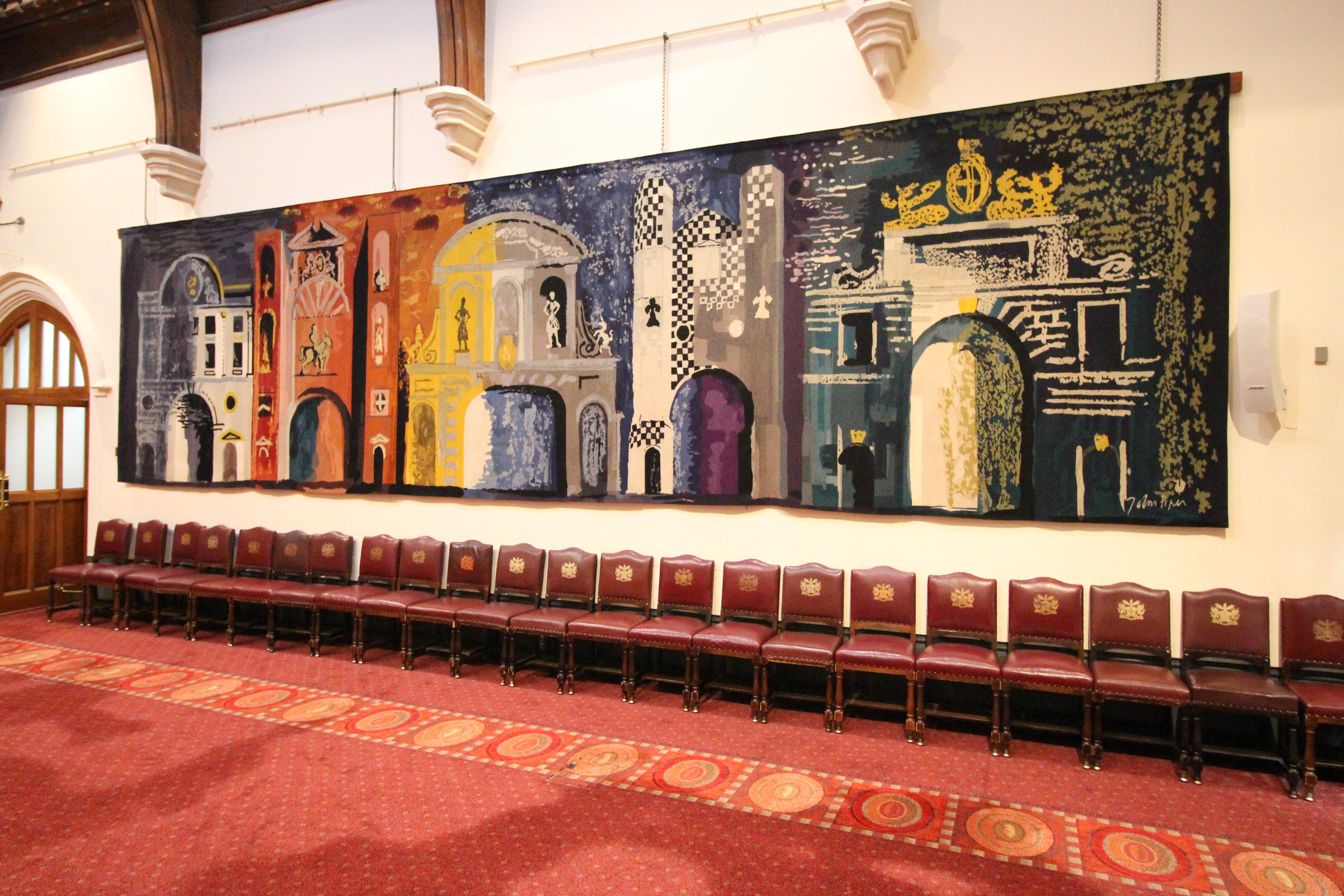
Five Gates of London tapestry, 1975, Guildhall, London

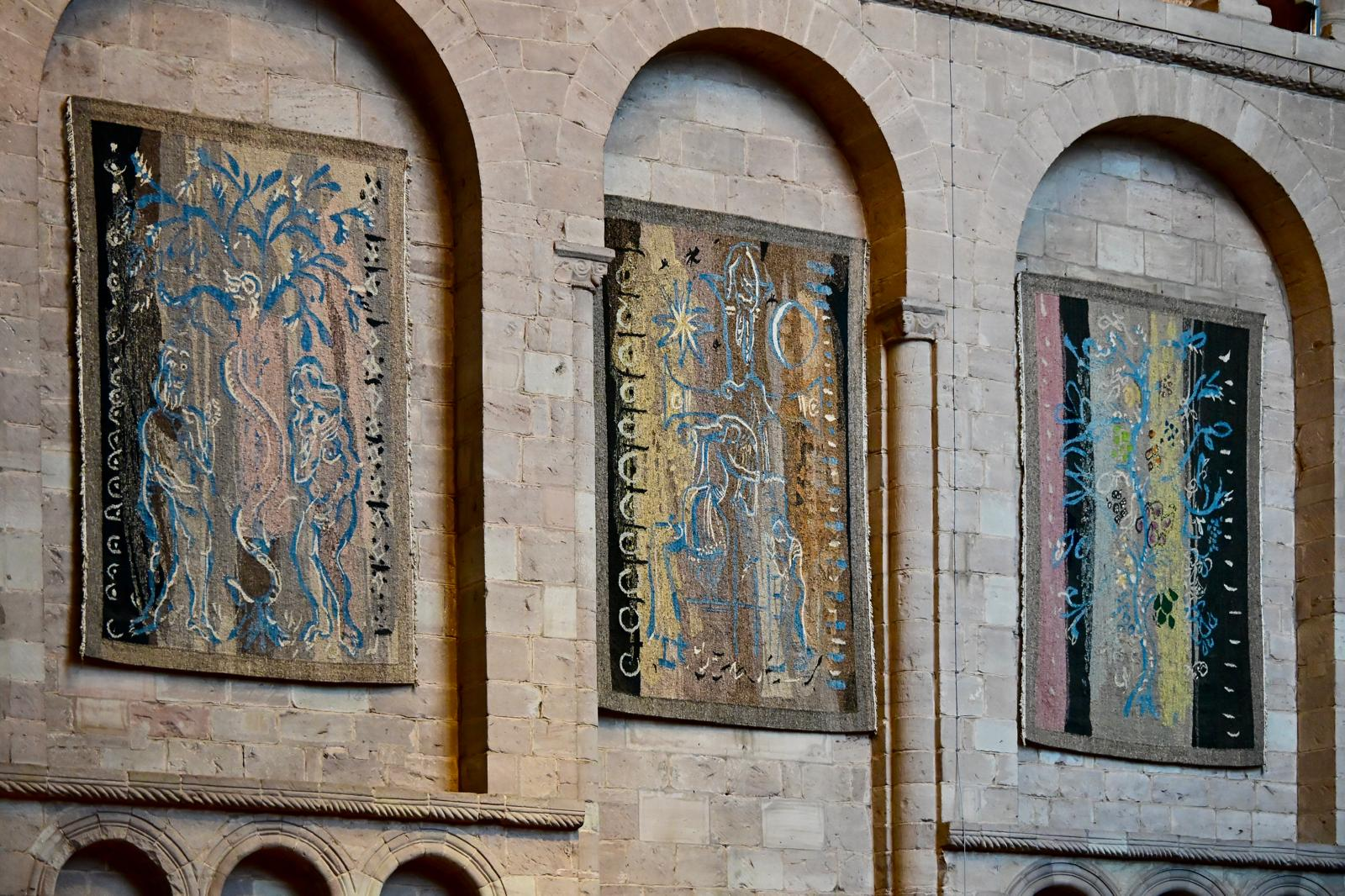
Hereford Cathedral tapestries, 1976

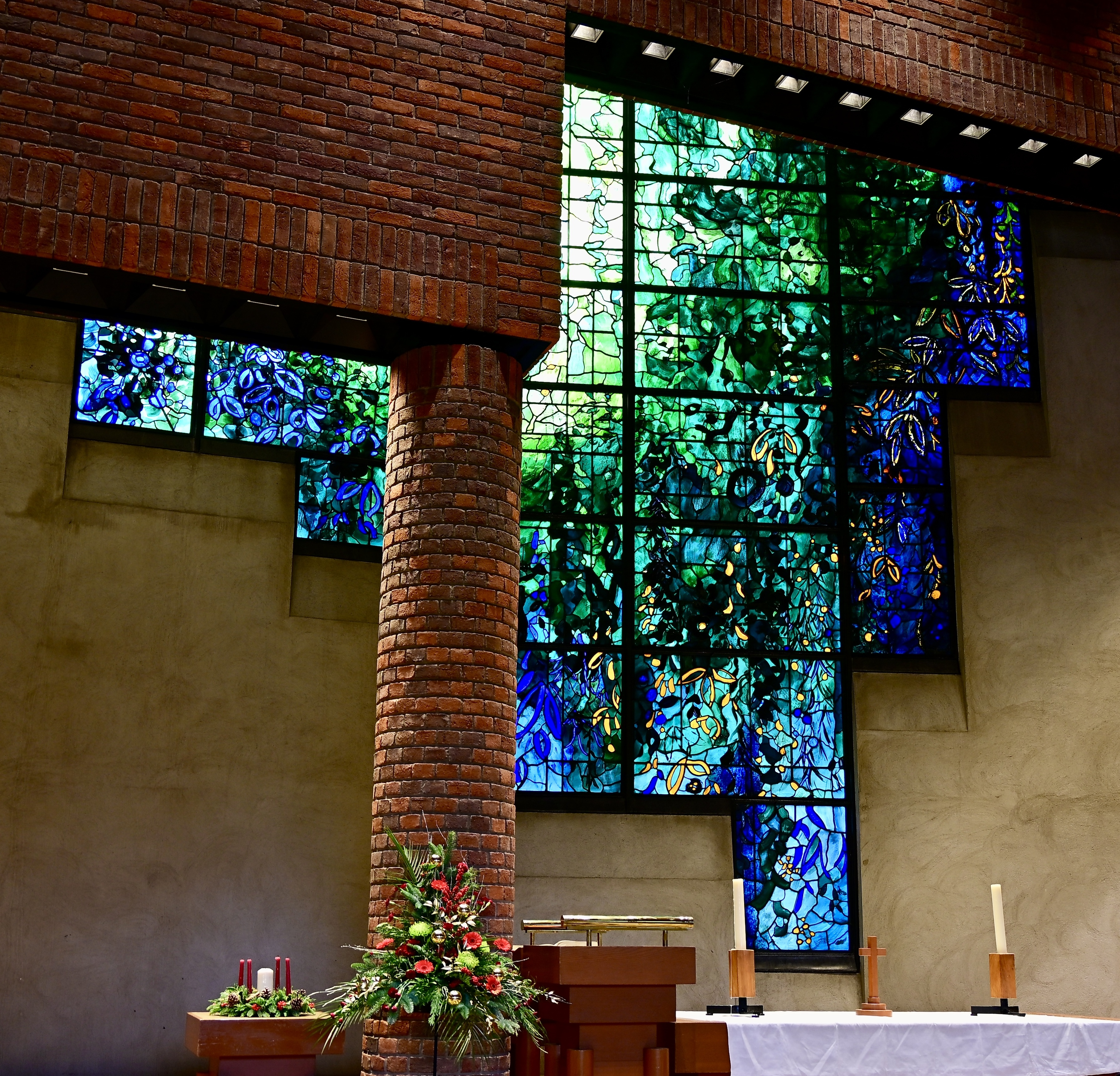
Chapel of Robinson College, Cambridge, 1980

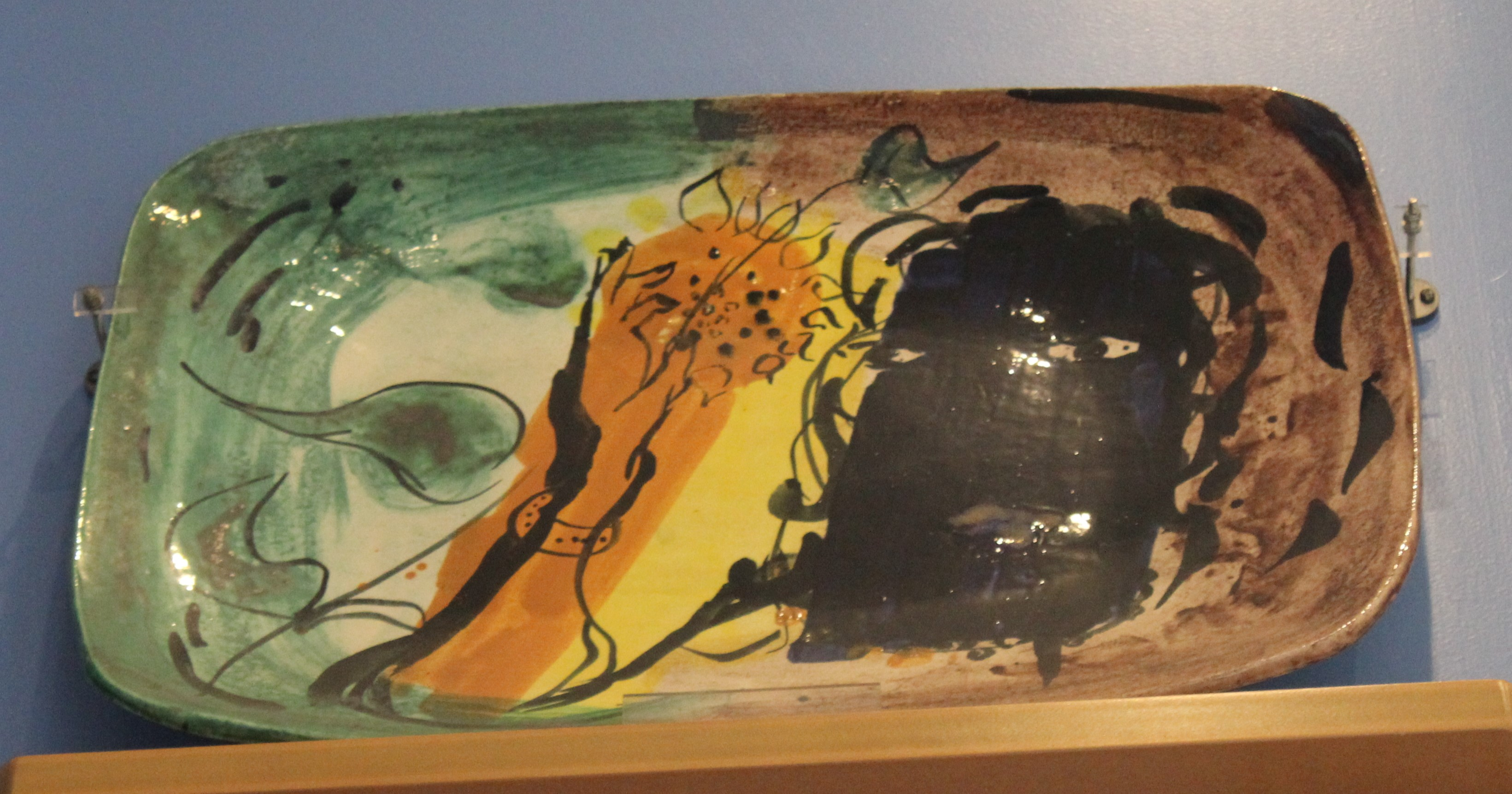
Girl with a Sunflower, 1983, Eastop & Piper

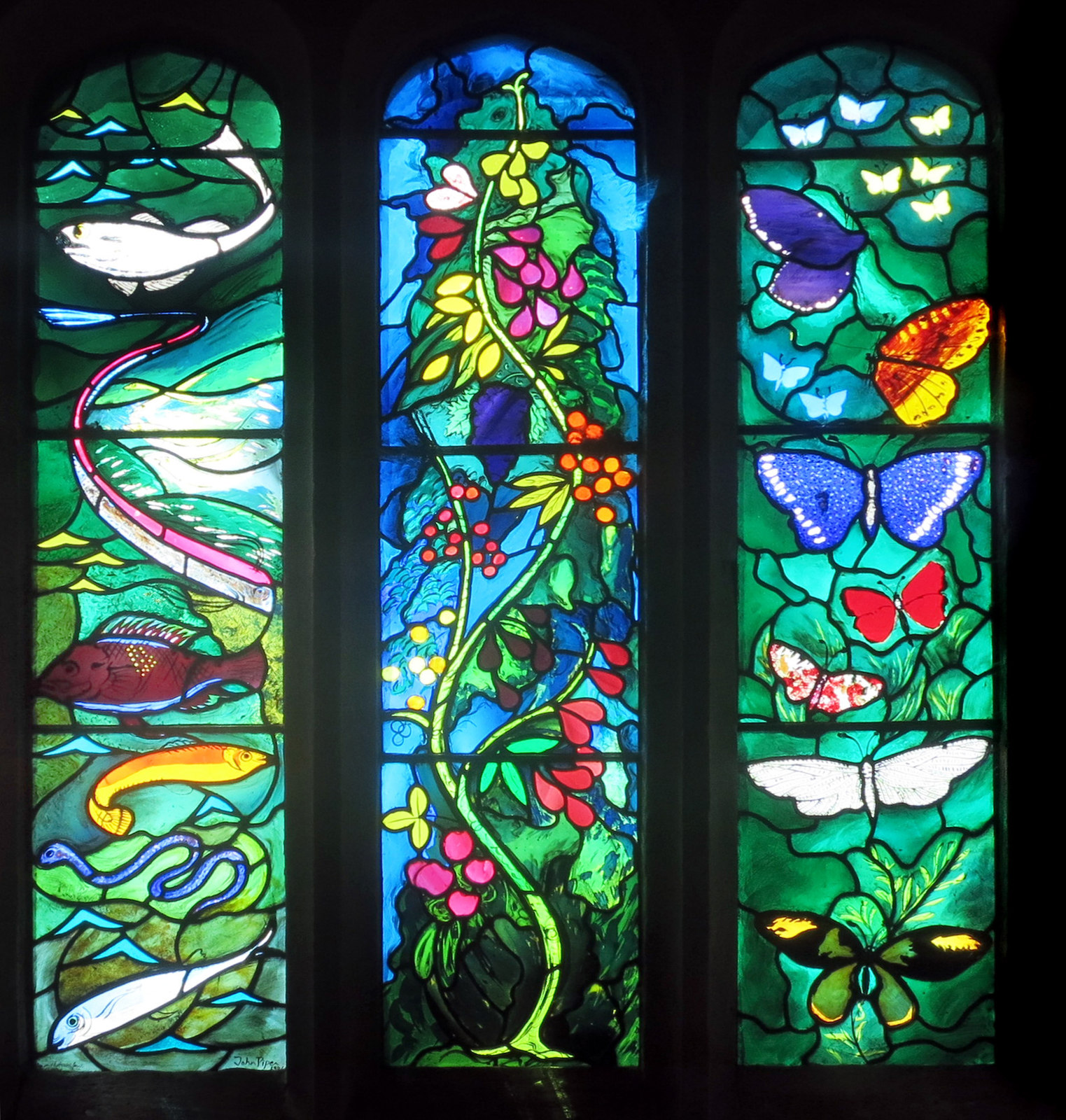
All Saints Church, Farnborough, Berkshire, 1984–86
