= Catmore =

Village in Berkshire, England

Coordinates: 51°31′08″N 1°20′53″W

- Village
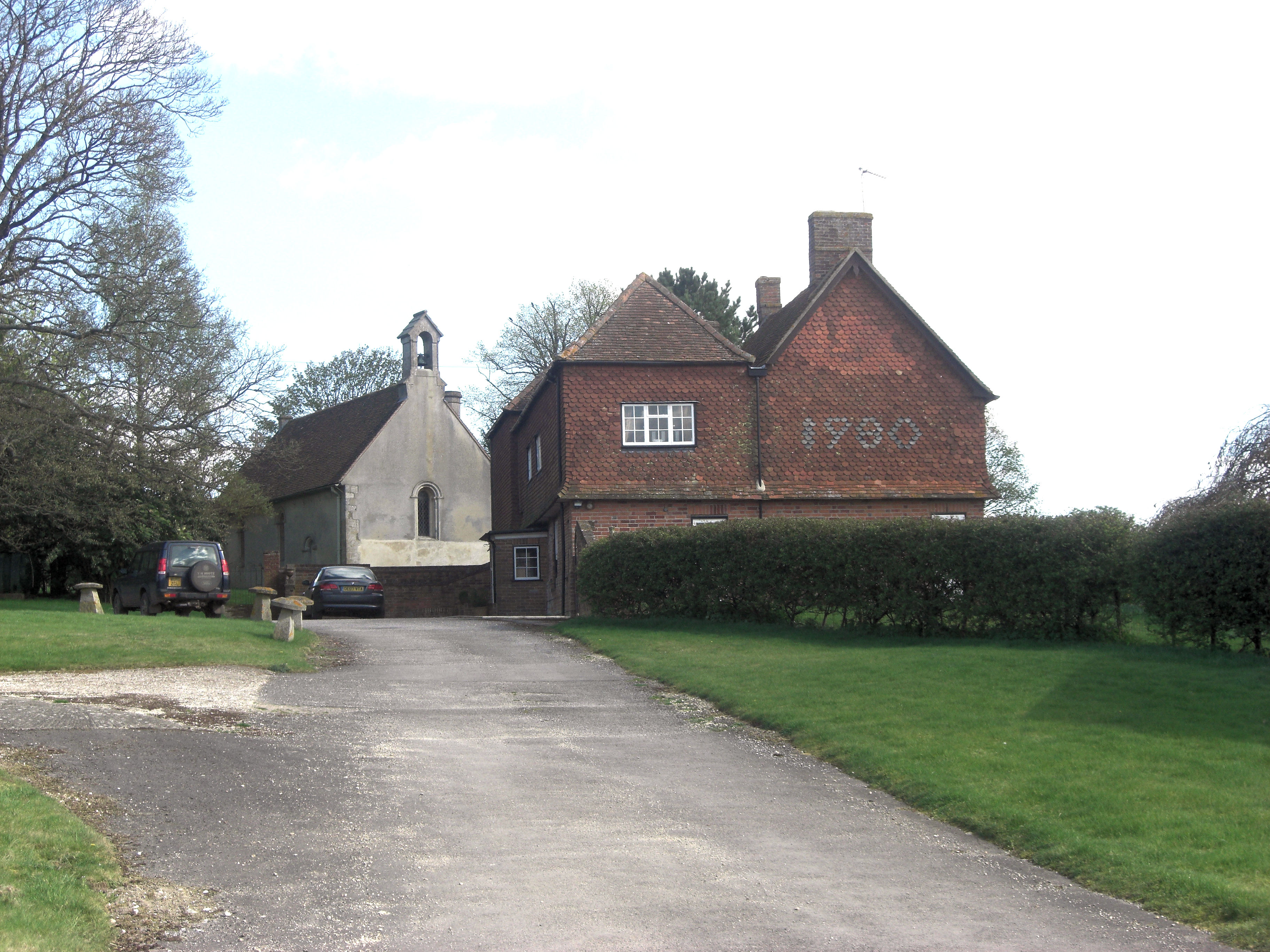
- Catmore Farm House (right) and St Margaret's parish church (centre left)

- Location within Berkshire
- Population: 28 (2001 Census)
- OS grid reference: SU4580
- Civil parish: Catmore
- Unitary authority: West Berkshire
- Ceremonial county: Berkshire
- Region: South East
- Country: England
- Sovereign state: United Kingdom
- Post town: Newbury
- Postcode district: RG20
- Dialling code: 01488
- Police: Thames Valley
- Fire: Royal Berkshire
- Ambulance: South Central
- UK Parliament: Newbury

Catmore is a civil parish and village in West Berkshire about 5 1/2 miles (9 km) southeast of Wantage. Catmore is in the Berkshire Downs and the centre of the village is about 575 feet (175 m) above sea level.

== Population ==
The 2001 Census recorded a population of only 28, making Catmore the least populous parish in Berkshire. In the 2011 Census the Office for National Statistics did not publish Catmore's population separately, but combined it with the neighbouring civil parish of Farnborough. But Catmore remains a separate civil parish, governed by its own parish meeting.

== Toponym ==
The toponym "Catmore" is derived from the Old English for "wild-cat lake". The earliest known records of it are from 916 and 931 in the Cartularium Saxonicum, where it appears as Catmere, Catmeringa and Catmæringa. In the same body of charters it is recorded again in 951 as Catmeres gemære and Catbeorh. The Domesday Book of 1086 records it as Catmere. It evolved via Catmor in the 12th century, Cattermere in the 14th century, Catmard in the 15th century and Cattmere in the 17th century before reaching its present form.

== Manor ==
In the time of Edward the Confessor (reigned 1042–66) a Saxon called Ezui held the manor. The manor was devastated in the Norman Conquest of England. The Domesday Book of 1086 records that what was left of the manor was held by the Norman baron Henry de Ferrers. Under the de Ferrers, Catmore became part of the Honour of Tutbury. Two centuries later Robert de Ferrers, 6th Earl of Derby took part in a rebellion against Edward III. He was defeated at Chesterfield in 1266, imprisoned, and all his properties were confiscated by the Crown.

In 1267 Edward III created Edmund Crouchback 1st Earl of Lancaster and granted him many of the de Ferrers estates, including those of the Honour of Tutbury. In 1399 Henry Bolingbroke, 2nd Duke of Lancaster became Henry IV and the House of Lancaster's estates were merged with those of the Crown. Catmore Farm House was the manor house. It was built in the 14th century, extended in the 15th century and again in the 16th century. It is built partly of brick and partly with a timber frame. It is a Grade II* listed building.

== Parish church ==
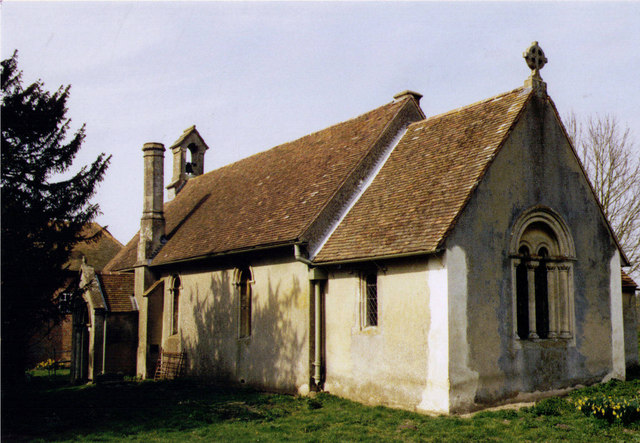
St Margaret's parish church seen from the southeast

The Church of England parish church of Saint Margaret is a Norman building from the latter half of the 12th century. Surviving original Norman work includes the north and south doorways and the font. The north doorway is now blocked and the font has been halved in height. The Knights Hospitaller held the advowson of St Margaret's by the time of Richard I (reigned 1189–99). They retained it until Henry VIII had the Order in England suppressed as part of the Dissolution of the Monasteries. The nave was re-roofed in 1607. It has collar beams and wind braces and the date is carved on some of its timbers.

By 1850 the building had been heavily restored and numerous Norman Revival features more ornate than the original work had been added. These include the east window of two round-headed lancets. There is no known record of the date of the work or the name of the architect. Saint Margaret's has one bell, cast by Henry Bagley. The Bagley family ran a bell foundry at Chacombe in Northamptonshire from 1605 until 1785, and for shorter periods also cast bells at Ecton in Northamptonshire and Witney in Oxfordshire. The church is a Grade I listed building. The Diocese of Oxford declared it redundant on 1 December 1973 and is vested in the Churches Conservation Trust on 13 April 1999. It is open daily to visitors.

== Sources ==
- Ditchfield, PH; Page, William, eds. (1924). "Catmore". A History of the County of Berkshire. Victoria County History. Vol. IV. assisted by John Hautenville Cope. London: The St Katherine Press. pp. 9–11.
- Ekwall, Eilert (1960) [1936]. Concise Oxford Dictionary of English Place-Names (4th ed.). Oxford: Oxford University Press. Catmore. ISBN 0198691033.
- Pevsner, Nikolaus (1966). Berkshire. The Buildings of England. Harmondsworth: Penguin Books. p. 110.
