= June Osborne (historian) =

English historian

June Osborne is an English writer, lecturer and historian, specialising in art history, stained glass and Renaissance architecture.

== Life and career ==
Osborne was born in Evesham, Worcestershire, England, and read English at Bristol University. Osborne's early career was in art galleries and museums, holding curatorial posts in Bath, Christchurch and Oldham. She later studied art history and was a research assistant of Ernst Gombrich at the Slade School of Art.

Osborne lectured at the universities of Kent, London, and Sussex. She also taught art history at the Department of Continuing Education at Oxford University, including a course entitled "Palaces and Courts of the Renaissance". Osborne has worked with the Council for the Care of Churches. Osborne is the author of several books on art history and architecture. Her book on the English painter and stained-glass artist John Piper was written in consultation with his widow, Myfanwy Piper.

== Bibliography ==
- Osborne, June (1981). Stained Glass in England. London: Frederick Muller. ISBN 0584972938. 2nd ed., Allan Sutton, 1993, ISBN 0750902345.
- Osborne, June (1989). Entertaining Elizabeth I: Progresses and Great Houses of Her Time. London: Bishopsgate. ISBN 978-1852190552.
- Osborne, June (1990). Hampton Court Palace. London: HMSO. ISBN 011290484X.
- Osborne, June (1997). John Piper and Stained Glass. London: Sutton Publishing. ISBN 0750910887.
- Osborne, June (2003). Urbino: The Story of a Renaissance City. London: Frances Lincoln. ISBN 9780711220867.
