= Shell Guides =

20th-century series of guidebooks to Britain

Shell Guide
- Shell Guide by Michael Pitt-Rivers about Dorset (1968)
- Language: English
- Genre: Guidebook
- Publisher: The Architectural Press; Pavilion Books; Faber and Faber
- Publication date: 1934–1984
- Publication place: United Kingdom

The Shell Guides were originally a 20th-century series of guidebooks on the counties of Britain. They were aimed at a new breed of car-driving metropolitan tourist, and for those who sought guides that were neither too serious nor too shallow and who took pleasure in the ordinary and peculiar culture of small town Britain. In the three decades after the Second World War the Shell Guides provided a surreptitiously subversive synthesis of the British countryside.

== History ==
The series started in June 1934, with John Betjeman's Cornwall, and continued until 1984, by which time about half the country had been covered. The series was sponsored by the oil company Shell. The original guides were published on a county-by-county basis, under the editorial control of the poet John Betjeman and (later) the artist John Piper. There were three publishers involved in the publication of the thirteen pre-war titles: The Architectural Press, Batsford and finally, in 1939, Faber and Faber. In 1939 all the previous twelve titles were re-issued and one new one in the same format: David Verey's Gloucestershire. The next one planned was Shropshire, to be co-written by Betjeman and Piper. However, the Second World War intervened. Only one non-English area was covered: The West Coast of Scotland by Stephen Bone, arguably the most political of all the Shell Guides. After the war, however, every bit of Wales was covered in five different titles. It was not until 1951 that the next Shell Guide was produced. Jack Beddington's involvement in the Shell Guides and Shell advertising in general cannot be overestimated and it is because of him, that from the outset, artists were invited to produce Shell Guides; John and Paul Nash for instance and of course John Piper.

Wrap cover of the 1964 Shilling Guide to Derbyshire and Staffordshire, published by Shell-Mex and BP; art by Julian Trevelyan

During the early 1960s a series of 48 cheaper Shilling Guides appeared, much to Betjeman's annoyance, especially as they sold in greater numbers. Published by the Shell-Mex and BP joint venture, each had just 20 pages with a full colour card cover, representing highlights of the county covered, and included a two-colour map of the area, preceded by an essay on the history and landscape, and followed by a short gazetteer of main towns and tourist attractions. The original artwork for this series was sold by Shell in 2002 at an auction held by Sotheby's. These images by such artists as Keith Shackleton and David Gentleman also featured in the (now collectable) Shell posters that were published for use in schools. These appeared between 1959 and 1965.

From the late 1950s to the early 1970s, a series of general titles under the Shell Guide banner were produced, covering most of the countries in northwest Europe. Guides to subjects such as rivers, islands, viewpoints, archaeology, gardens, flowers, history, wildlife and museums were also published.

In 1987, Shell issued a final series of New Shell Guides, published by Michael Joseph and generally covering rather larger areas (e.g. Northern Scotland and the Islands) than in the earlier series. Whilst the original Shell County Guides are now highly collectable, the later titles (published by Faber and Faber, Ebury Press or Michael Joseph) tend to be shunned by collectors and book dealers alike, as supply exceeds demand.

== Selected books ==
- Of the original pre-war guides, Paul Nash's Dorset (1936) has been described as the most artistically experimental of the series.
- The more collectable post-war guides include Betjeman and Piper's Shropshire (1951), David Verey's Mid-Wales (1960), W. G. Hoskins' Rutland guide (1963) and James Lees-Milne's Worcestershire (1964). In her biography of John Piper (2009), Frances Spalding highlights Henry Thorold's Derbyshire (1972) as one of the best later titles. Thorold also wrote the last book in the series, Nottinghamshire in 1984, published the same year that Betjeman died.
- Wynford Vaughan-Thomas's South-West and Mid-Wales is an example of the 1987 New Shell Guides series.
- The Shell Guide series featured many photographs. John Piper was an accomplished black and white photographer, as was his son Edward. Peter Burton took many of the photos for the last titles. Paul Nash took hundreds of photos for his pre-war guide and whittled them down to those that made it into the finished product.

== Discovering Britain with John Betjeman ==
Sponsored by Shell, a series of at least 20 three-minute clips, entitled Discovering Britain with John Betjeman, were broadcast during ITV commercial breaks from the channel's first Friday on air, 23 September 1955, until the temporary absence of branded petrol on 1 December 1956, and depicted Betjeman (who wrote and delivered the scripts) visiting relatively unobvious historical locations in Britain, sometimes archaeological sites or sometimes whole towns, including Marlborough, Wiltshire, where Betjeman attended school. The first of these de facto Shell commercials, a film about Avebury stone circle and Silbury Hill in Wiltshire, was even promoted with an advertisement in the TV Times. Shell's selling message was confined to the use of its logo at each end of the advertisements. Discovering Britain did not return when branded petrol advertising, which had largely been outlawed during the Suez Crisis, returned to British television in May 1957, although the cost of repeatedly producing three-minute commercials each week would have proved unmanageable for Shell.

Discussing the series in his history of British television advertising, Brian Henry commended Betjeman's "scholarship and infectious dilettantism", which he deemed rare in a broadcaster, and Shell's involvement, writing: "Shell, which has always enjoyed a considerable reputation as a patron of the arts and artists, deserves to be congratulated on conceiving a use of television advertising — years ahead of its time — which did much to raise the standards of commercials and showed that a TV advertisement could be literate, gentle and scholarly. And still remain effective."
