= BBC Regional Programme =

Former British regional radio service (1930–1939)

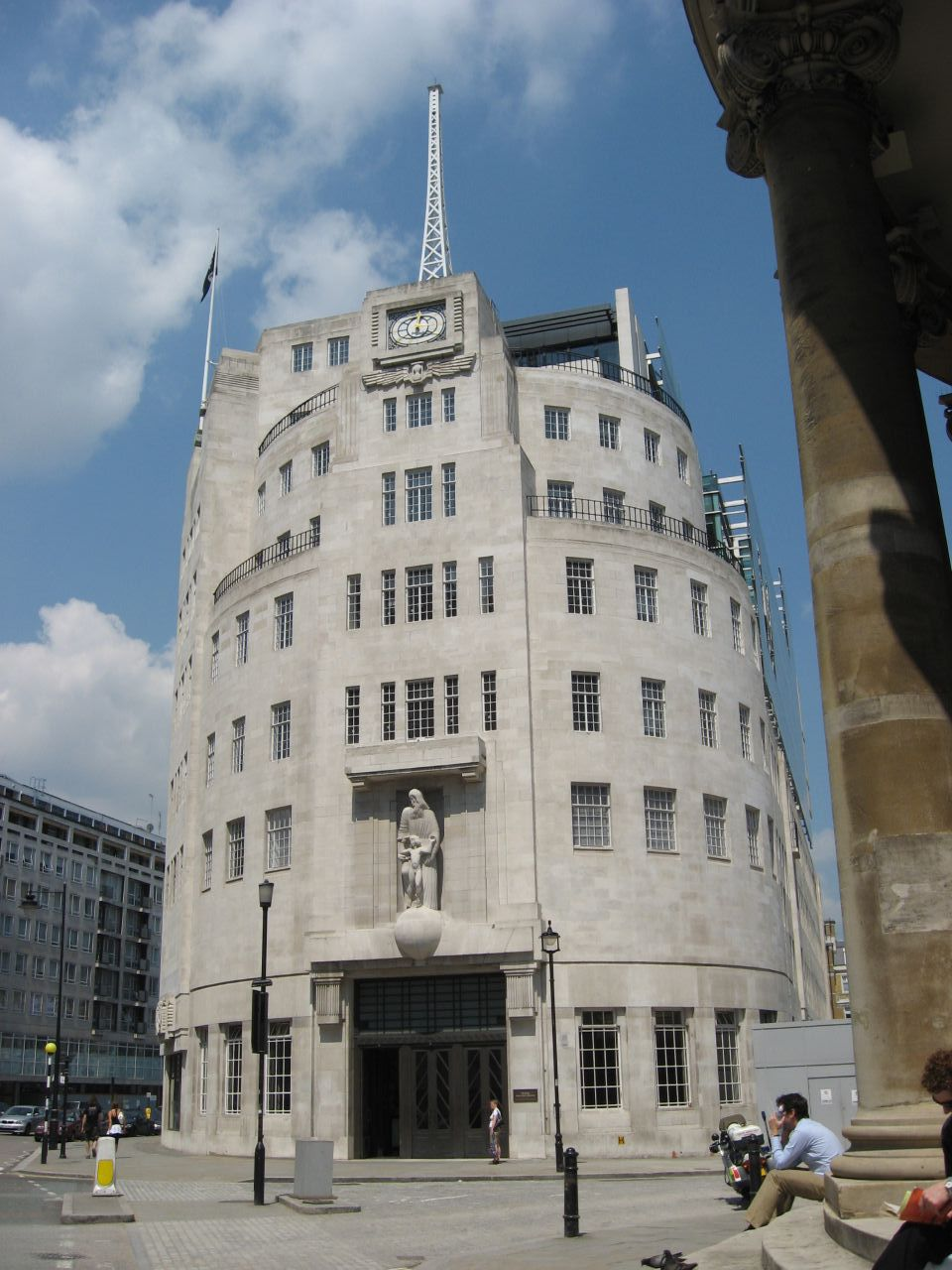
- The Regional Programme headquarters was at Broadcasting House in London.
- Country: United Kingdom
- Headquarters: Broadcasting House, London, England
- Owner: BBC
- Launch date: 9 March 1930; 95 years ago
- Dissolved: 31 August 1939; 86 years ago
- Language: English
- Replaced: 5XX
- Replaced by: BBC Home Service

The BBC Regional Programme was a radio service which was on the air from 9 March 1930 – replacing a number of earlier BBC local stations between 1922 and 1924 – until 1 September 1939 when it was subsumed into the BBC Home Service, two days before the outbreak of World War II.

Both the BBC National Programme and the Regional Programme provided a mixed mainstream radio service. Whilst the two services provided different programming, allowing listeners a choice they were not streamed to appeal to different audiences, rather they were intended to offer a choice of programming to a single audience. While using the same transmitters, the National Programme broadcast significantly more speech and classical music than its successor, the BBC Light Programme. Similarly, the Regional Programme broadcast much more light and dance music than its successor, the Home Service.

== History ==
=== Development ===
When the British Broadcasting Company first began transmissions on 14 November 1922 from station 2LO in the Strand, which it had inherited from the Marconi Company (one of six commercial companies which created), but technology did not yet exist either for national coverage or joint programming between transmitters. Whilst it was possible to combine large numbers of trunk telephone lines to link transmitters for individual programmes, the process was expensive and not encouraged by the General Post Office as it tied up large parts of the telephone network. The stations that followed the establishment of 2LO in London were therefore autonomously programmed using local talent and facilities.

By May 1923, simultaneous broadcasting was technically possible at least between main transmitters and relay stations, the quality was not felt to be high enough to provide a national service or regular simultaneous broadcasts. In 1924, it was felt that technical standards had improved enough for London to start to provide the majority of the output, cutting the local stations back to providing items of local interest.

==== Main stations ====
Each of these main stations was broadcast at approximately 1 kilowatt (kW):

Airdate	Station ID	City	Initial frequency
14 November 1922	2LO	London	822 kHz
15 November 1922	5IT	Birmingham	626 kHz
15 November 1922	2ZY	Manchester	794 kHz
24 December 1922	5NO	Newcastle upon Tyne	743 kHz
13 February 1923	5WA	Cardiff	850 kHz
6 March 1923	5SC	Glasgow	711 kHz
10 October 1923	2BD	Aberdeen	606 kHz
17 October 1923	6BM	Bournemouth	777 kHz
14 September 1924	2BE	Belfast	689 kHz

==== Relay stations ====
Each of these relay stations were broadcast at approximately 120 watts (W):

Airdate	Station ID	City	Relay of	Frequency
16 November 1923	6FL	Sheffield	2ZY	980 kHz
28 March 1924	5PY	Plymouth	6BM	887 kHz
1 May 1924	2EH	Edinburgh	5SC	914 kHz
11 June 1924	6LV	Liverpool	2ZY	906 kHz
8 July 1924	2LS	Leeds and Bradford	2ZY	935 kHz
15 August 1924	6KH	Kingston upon Hull	2ZY	896 kHz
16 September 1924	5NG	Nottingham	2ZY	920 kHz
21 October 1924	6ST	Stoke-on-Trent	2ZY	996 kHz
12 November 1924	2DE	Dundee	2BD	952 kHz
12 December 1924	5SX	Swansea	5WA	622 kHz

=== Regional scheme ===
On 21 August 1927, the BBC opened a high-power medium wave transmitter 5GB at its Daventry site to replace the existing local stations in the English Midlands, that allowed the experimental longwave transmitter 5XX to provide a service – which eventually came to be called the BBC National Programme from London and available to the majority of the population.

By combining the resources of the local stations into one regional station in each area with a basic sustaining service from London, the BBC hoped to increase programme quality whilst also centralising the management of the radio service known as the "regional scheme".

The local transmitters were gradually either converted to a regional service relay or closed entirely and replaced by high-power regional broadcasts. Some local studios were retained to provide for programming from specific areas within each region. Most transmitters also carried the National Programme on a local frequency to supplement the longwave broadcasts from 5XX; initially these were on three separate frequencies and programming included some local variations. As the regional network expanded these transmissions were fully synchronised with those from Brookmans Park and several other frequencies initially:

Airdate	Transmitter	Service	Initial frequency	Frequency (1939)
21 August 1927	Daventry^{[a]}	Midland Regional Programme (5GB station until 8 March 1930)	767 kHz	N/A
21 October 1929	Brookmans Park^{[b]}	London Regional Programme (basic network sustaining service) (2LO station until 8 March 1930)	842 kHz	877 kHz
17 May 1931	Moorside Edge	Northern Regional Programme	626 kHz	668 kHz
13 September 1931	Westerglen	Scottish Regional Programme	797 kHz	767 kHz
28 May 1933	Washford^{[c]}	Western Regional Programme	968 kHz	1050 kHz
17 February 1935	Droitwich	Midland Regional Programme	1013 kHz	1013 kHz
20 March 1936	Lisnagarvey	Northern Ireland Regional Programme	977 kHz	977 kHz
12 October 1936	Burghead	Scottish Regional Programme	767 kHz	767 kHz
1 February 1937	Penmon	Welsh Regional Programme (Wales and West until 3 July)	804 kHz	804 kHz
4 July 1937	Washford	Welsh Regional Programme	804 kHz	804 kHz
19 October 1937	Stagshaw	Stagshaw Programme (North Regional with some relays from Scottish Regional at times)	1122 kHz	1122 kHz
14 June 1939	Clevedon	West Regional Programme	1474 kHz	1474 kHz
14 June 1939	Start Point	West Regional Programme	1050 kHz	1050 kHz

A relay station for Brookmans Park on 1402 kHz was due to open at Acle near Norwich in 1940, but construction was postponed by the outbreak of World War II. The station was never completed and was replaced by one at Postwick.

=== Closure ===
Upon the outbreak of World War II, the BBC closed both existing National and Regional radio programmes to replace them with a single channel known as the BBC Home Service. The transmitter network was synchronised on 668 kHz and 767 kHz in order to use the other frequencies for propaganda broadcasts in foreign languages. Each transmitter group would be turned off during air raids to prevent their signals being used as navigational beacons. Listeners were required to retune to a low-powered single-frequency network on 1474 kHz which did not offer any meaningful directional information to aircraft.

On 29 July 1945, within 12 weeks of Victory in Europe Day, the BBC reactivated the Regional Programme but kept the name "Home Service" (until 30 September 1967 as the station became BBC Radio 4). The National Programme was also reopened under a new name as the BBC Light Programme.

== Sources ==
=== Notes ===
1. ^a Until 16 February 1935.
2. ^b The Brookmans Park transmitter covered London, South East England and much of East Anglia. However, as the sustaining service for the rest of the network, the London programme was not normally referred to on-air such as Radio Times, but simply as the "Regional Programme" (internally, "the basic Regional Programme").
3. ^c Until 13 June 1939.

=== Further reading ===
- The BBC Year-book 1933. London: BBC. 1933. OCLC 867862862.
- The BBC Year Book 1947. London: BBC. 1948. OCLC 770477752.
- Graham, Russ J (15 August 2001). "A local service". Transdiffusion Broadcasting System.
- Graham, Russ J (15 August 2001). "A new lease of life". Transdiffusion Broadcasting System.
- Groves, Paul (2004). "History of Radio Transmission in the UK" (PDF). Frequency Finder (published May 2016).
- McCarthy, Clive (28 May 2007). "Development of the BBC AM Transmitter Network" (PDF). BBCeng.info. 6a.
- Paulu, Burton (1967). Radio and Television Broadcasting on the European Continent. Minneapolis: University of Minnesota Press. ISBN 9780816660469. OCLC 503607289 – via Google Books.
- Briggs, Asa (1995). The History of Broadcasting in the United Kingdom: Volume II: The Golden Age of the Wireless. Oxford University Press. ISBN 0-19-212930-9 – via Google Books.
- Smith, Mike (2010). "How It All Began". UK Radio: A Brief History - Part 1. MDS975. Archived from the original on 11 June 2011.
