= Works of John Betjeman =

List of written works

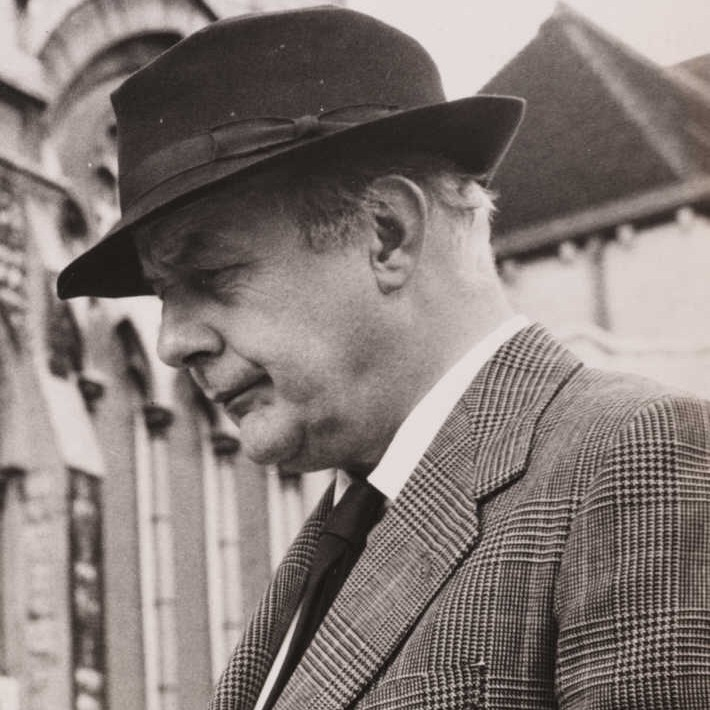
Betjeman in 1961

Sir John Betjeman (1906–1984) was a twentieth-century English poet, writer and broadcaster. Born to a middle-class family in Edwardian Hampstead, he attended Oxford University, although left without graduating. He turned down a position in the family furniture business, and instead took a series of jobs before becoming the assistant editor of The Architectural Review in 1931, which reflected a deeply held affection for buildings and their history. That same year he published his first book, Mount Zion, a collection of poems. (Note: Although some sources put the date he joined The Architectural Review as 1931, others put the date as 1930.)

In 1932 Betjeman began a career in broadcasting, with a radio programme about the proposed destruction of Waterloo Bridge; he continued with regular radio work for the rest of his life, appearing in a wide range of genres, from panel and game shows, interviews, news interviews, documentaries and poetry readings. He published his first non-verse book in 1933, Ghastly Good Taste, which was subtitled "a Depressing Story of the Rise and Fall of English Architecture"; it reflected his concern of the destruction of Victorian and Edwardian architecture to make way for "grimmer contemporary developments, shopping arcades, and bogus Tudor bars". In 1937—shortly after the BBC began regular screen broadcasts—he appeared in his first television programme, How to Make a Guidebook, and went on to appear in a wide range of programmes until his death. His television appearances increased from the 1950s, and his output was prolific.

In 1960 Betjeman was appointed a Commander of the Most Excellent Order of the British Empire (CBE), which was followed in 1968 with his election as a Companion of Literature. In 1969 he was knighted and, in 1972, he succeeded Cecil Day-Lewis as Britain's Poet Laureate. In the later years of his life, Betjeman suffered from Parkinson's disease, and he died in May 1984. His obituarist in The Times thought him "a true original", and considered that he was "whimsical, imprudent, shrewd, humorous, disarming, always something of an enfant terrible". The poet Philip Larkin wrote that Betjeman "was not only the best loved poet, but one of the best loved men of our time", while his biographer, the academic John Clarke, described him as a "unique figure in twentieth-century English poetry, enjoying a degree of fame and success unequalled by any poet since Byron".

== Verse ==
Betjeman's poetry
Title	Year of first publication	First edition publisher (London, unless otherwise stated)	Notes	Ref.
Mount Zion	1931	James Press		
Continual Dew, a Little Book of Bourgeois Verse	1937	John Murray		
Sir John Piers	1938	Westmeath Examiner, Mullingar, Ireland	Published under the pseudonym Epsilon	
Old Lights for New Chancels, verses topographical and amatory	1940	John Murray		
New Bats in Old Belfries	1945	John Murray		
Slick but not Streamlined	1947	Doubleday, Garden City N.Y.	Introduction by W. H. Auden	
Selected Poems	1948	John Murray	preface by John Sparrow	
St. Katherine's Church, Chiselhampton, Oxfordshire	1950	Privately printed, Chiselhampton	Subtitled Verses Turned in Aid of a Public Subscription towards the Restoration of the Church of St. Katherine, Chiselhampton	
A Few Late Chrysanthemums	1954	John Murray		
Poems in the Porch	1954	Society for Promoting Christian Knowledge		
Collected Poems	1958	John Murray	Compiled and with an introduction by the Earl of Birkenhead. This consisted of a selection of Betjeman's poems, rather than a collection of all his work; there have been numerous reprints, some of which have provided additional works for inclusion. (Note: These reprints include in 1958, 1959 (when it was enlarged), 1962 (when it was enlarged again), 1970, 1971 and 1980.)	
John Betjeman	1958	John Murray	Selected poems	
Lament for Moira McCavendish	c. 1958–59	Browne Lismore	Undated, but c. 1958–59; booklet, limited to 20 copies	
Summoned by Bells	1960	John Murray		
A Ring of Bells	1962	John Murray		
High and Low	1966	John Murray		
Six Betjeman Songs	1967	Duckworth		
A Wembley Lad and The Crem	1971	Poem of the Month Club		
A Nip in the Air	1974	John Murray		
Betjeman in Miniature: selected poems of Sir John Betjeman	1976	Gleniffer Press, Paisley		
The Best of Betjeman	1978	John Murray	Selected by John Guest	
Five Betjeman Songs	1980	Joseph Weinberger		
Ode on the Marriage of HRH Prince Charles to Lady Diana Spencer	1980	Warren Editions	Limited to 125 copies	
Church Poems	1981	John Murray		
Uncollected Poems	1982	John Murray		
Betjeman's Cornwall	1984	John Murray		
Ah Middlesex	1984	Warren Editions	Limited to 250 copies	
Harvest Bells: New and Uncollected Poems (ed. Kevin J. Gardner)	2019	Bloomsbury Continuum	PDF ebook	

== Radio ==
Betjeman was broadcast in numerous radio performances, although no full record exists. Most were on British radio, although he also made recordings for American radio.

Radio broadcasts of Betjeman
Broadcast	Date	Channel	Notes	Ref.
"Waterloo Bridge is Falling Down"	17 February 1932	BBC National Programme		
"Conversations in the Train: On the 9.20"	30 April 1932	BBC National Programme		
"All Male Novelty Variety"	1 December 1932	BBC National Programme		
"One Hour of Modern Variety"	23 January 1933	BBC National Programme		
"Variety"	10 February 1933	BBC London Programme		
"One Hour of Variety"	29 March 1933	BBC London Programme		
"Wanted—A Free Hand"	20 February 1934	BBC Regional Programme		
Crowded Moments	2 May 1936	BBC Regional Programme		
"West Country Calendar: May Games or Matter for a May Morning"	18 May 1936	BBC Regional Programme		
Crowded Moments	24 June 1936	BBC Regional Programme		
Crowded Moments	22 August 1936	BBC Regional Programme		
"The Clifton Suspension Bridge"	27 August 1936	BBC Regional Programme		
"Extremes Meet: Build or Rebuild?"	20 December 1936	BBC Regional Programme		
"After Dinner"	26 February 1937	BBC Regional Programme		
Town Tours	12 April – 24 June 1937	BBC West of England Programme	Six episodes	
"What is Wrong with the Cinema"	4 September 1937	BBC National Programme		
Eccentrics: "Adolphus Cooke Esq of Cookesborough"	24 September 1937	BBC Regional Programme	The producer of the programme was Guy Burgess	
Seaview: "Visitors"	22 April 1938	BBC West of England Programme		
Seaview: "A Horrible Holiday"	6 May 1938	BBC West of England Programme		
Seaview: "Where are you Going"	11 May 1938	BBC West of England Programme		
"How to Look at a Church"	31 August 1938	BBC West of England Programme		
"Up to London"	2 January 1939	BBC West of England Programme		
Western Worthies: "The Parson Hawker of Morwenstow"	7 February 1939	BBC West of England Programme		
Built to Last	17 April – 27 June 1939	BBC Regional Programme	Six episodes	
"How to Look at Books"	15 August 1939	BBC Regional Programme		
"Sir Henry Newbolt"	4 January 1940	BBC Home Service		
"Back to the Railway Carriage"	10 March 1940	BBC Home Service		
"Some Comments in Wartime"	4 July 1940	BBC Home Service		
"More Comments in Wartime"	12 August 1940	BBC Home Service		
"War Commentary"	21 November 1940	BBC Home Service		
"Coming Home, or England Revisited"	25 February 1943	BBC Home Service		
"How to Look at a Town"	6 July 1943	BBC Home Service		
"Second Hand Books"	4 November 1943	BBC Home Service		
"Personal Choice"	29 December 1943	BBC Regional Programme		
"The Ballad of Reading Gaol"	29 May 1944	BBC Home Service	Betjeman read excerpts of Oscar Wilde's work	
"The World Goes By"	5 August 1944	BBC Home Service		
Book Talk: "Yesterday's Fiction"	21 August 1944	BBC Home Service		
Book Talk: "Wartime Tastes in Reading"	4 September 1944	BBC Home Service		
"Domestic Interior"	14 September 1944	BBC Home Service		
Book Talk	18 September 1944	BBC Home Service		
Country Magazine: "Padstow and St Merryn, Cornwall"	19 November 1944	BBC Home Service		
Arts: "Looking at Things"	25 May 1945	BBC Home Service		
"Hawker of Morwenstone"	25 May 1945	BBC Home Service		
Western Men: "Sabine Baring-Gould"	21 September 1945	BBC West of England Home Service		
"Tennyson as a Humourist"	26 April 1946	BBC Home Service		
Literature in the West: "Augustus Toplady"	23 June 1946	BBC West of England Home Service		
West-Country Short Story: "Move with the Times"	11 September 1946	BBC Home Service		
Living Writers: "Evelyn Waugh"	14 December 1946	BBC Third Programme		
"Seeking Whom He May Devour"	27 December 1946	BBC Home Service		
"Time for Verse"	26 January 1947	BBC Home Service		
"Aberdeen Granite"	28 July 1947	BBC Third Programme		
"The Adventures of Mr. Verdant Green"	20 December 1947	BBC Third Programme		
"Christmas Nostalgia"	25 December 1947	BBC Home Service		
New Books and Old Books	12 June 1948	BBC Light Programme		
Three in Hand: "St Protus and St Hyacinth, Blisland, Cornwall"	21 July 1948	BBC West of England Home Service		
Three in Hand: "St John the Baptist, Mildenhall, Wiltshire"	28 July 1948	BBC West of England Home Service		
Three in Hand: "St Mark's, Swindon, Wiltshire"	4 August 1948	BBC West of England Home Service		
New Books and Old Books	30 October 1948	BBC Light Programme		
Buildings and Places: "Padstow"	6 February 1949	BBC Third Programme		
"Letcombe Bassett: The Future of a Village"	19 February 1949	BBC Light Programme		
The West in England's Story: "Victorian Provincial Life"	24 May 1949	BBC West of England Home Service		
Coast and Country	3 June – 27 September 1949	BBC West of England Home Service	Series one; nine episodes	
It Begins at Home: "St Petroc"	11 July 1949	BBC West of England Home Service		
"The Isle of Man"	7 August 1949	BBC Third Programme		
"Poetry Reading"	20 August 1949	BBC Third Programme	Betjeman reads a selection of his own poetry	
"Poetry Reading"	6 October 1949	BBC Third Programme	Betjeman reads a selection of his own poetry	
"Country Mixture"	28 October 1949	BBC West of England Home Service		
"It Begins at Home"	13 November 1949	BBC West of England Home Service		
The Critics	4 December 1949	BBC West of England Home Service		
The Critics	11 December 1949	BBC West of England Home Service		
The Critics	18 December 1949	BBC West of England Home Service		
"Two Thoughts in a Landscape"	16 April 1950	BBC Third Programme		
"A Hundred Years of Architecture in Wessex"	17 April 1950	BBC West of England Home Service		
"Love in the Valley"	21 April 1950	BBC Third Programme		
"For Your Book List"	5 May 1950	BBC West of England Home Service		
"The Future of the Town"	26 May 1950	BBC Third Programme		
Coast and Country	9 June – 29 September 1950	BBC West of England Home Service	Series two; five episodes	
"Tennyson as a Humorist"	7 July 1950	BBC Third Programme		
"Childhood Days"	16 July 1950	BBC Home Service		
"Théophile-Jules-Henri Marzials"	24 December 1950	BBC Third Programme		
"South Kentish Town"	9 January 1951	BBC Home Service		
The Week's Good Cause	4 February 1951	BBC Home Service	An appeal for the restoration fund of St Mary's Church, Mildenhall	
"Poetic Licence"	7 March 1951	BBC Home Service		
For Your Book List: "William Barnes"	20 March 1951	BBC West of England Home Service		
Let's Go	3 May – 20 September 1951	BBC Light Programme	Betjeman broadcast in seven episodes of the programme	
"Festival in London"	7 May 1951	BBC Home Service		
"Here is our Home"	10 May 1951	BBC West of England Home Service		
Coast and County	18 May – 23 August 1951	BBC West of England Home Service	Series three; five episodes	
The Faith in the West	10 July 1951 – 22 December 1957	BBC Home Service	Betjeman broadcast in 30 episodes of the programme	
"Some Thought on Christmas Parties"	26 December 1951	BBC Home Service		
Three in Hand: "Kelmscott Manor"	4 May 1952	BBC Home Service		
"New Soundings"	14 May 1952	BBC Third Programme		
Three in Hand: "Cardiff Castle"	18 May 1952	BBC Home Service		
"Pugin: A Great Victorian Architect"	15 September 1952	BBC Midland and West of England Home Service	To mark the centenary of Augustus Pugin	
Woman's Hour	24 September 1952	BBC Light Programme		
Evening Service	28 September 1952	BBC Home Service		
"The Fifty One Society"	21 March 1953	BBC North of England Home Service		
"Trains of Thought"	8 May 1953	BBC Home Service		
"Tercentenary of Staunton Harold Church"	27 September 1953	BBC Midlands Home Service		
"Changes of Morals"	15 June 1954	BBC Home Service		
"Town Forum"	17 June 1954	BBC Midlands Home Service		
Desert Island Discs	8 October 1954	BBC Radio 4		
"Personal Call"	11 October 1954	BBC London Calling Asia		
Foreigners	20 February – 13 December 1955	BBC Home Service	Series of three programmes	
"Frankly Speaking"	26 June – 27 December 1955	BBC Home Service	Betjeman broadcast in four episodes of the programme	
"A Christmas Wreath of Prose and Poetry, Woven by John Betjeman"	25 December 1955	BBC Home Service		
"Café Royal: A Study in Conversation"	28 December 1955	BBC Home Service		
"A Young Person's Forum on Books"	31 January 1956	BBC Home Service		
"Using Your Eyes"	20 June 1956	BBC Home Service		
Woman's Hour	27 July 1956	BBC Light Programme		
"Talking of Films"	12 August 1956	BBC Home Service		
"A Young Person's Forum on Books"	28 August 1956	BBC Home Service		
The Week's Good Cause	2 September 1956	BBC Midlands Home Service		
"Past Summers at the Seaside"	3 October 1956	BBC West of England Programme		
The Week's Good Cause	7 October 1956	BBC Midlands Home Service		
"Conversation Piece"	2 December 1956	BBC Home Service		
"Town and Country"	29 May 1957	BBC Home Service		
"The Younger Generation"	21 October 1957	BBC Network Three		
"Personal Choice"	20 February 1958	BBC Home Service		
"Tread Softly..."	16 March 1958	BBC Home Service		
John Betjeman: Poet, Connoisseur and Churchwarden	31 October – 14 November 1958	BBC General Overseas Service	Series of three programmes	
"Poetry Reading"	26 December 1958	BBC Third Programme	Betjeman reads a selection of his own poetry	
Woman's Hour	12 March 1959	BBC Light Programme		
The Week's Good Cause	3 May 1959	BBC Midlands Home Service		
Today	12 May 1959	BBC Home Service		
"The Island-Going Naturalist"	21 June 1959	BBC Home Service		
"Monday Night at Home"	29 June 1959	BBC Home Service		
"Glasgow: The Wondrous City"	6 September 1959	BBC Home Service		
In Town Tonight	3 October 1959	BBC Home Service		
"People Today"	24 December 1959	BBC Home Service		
"The Poetry of the Place"	10 February 1960	BBC General Overseas Service		
"The Enjoyment of Reading"	10 April 1960	BBC General Overseas Service		
"Life and Letters"	9 September 1960	BBC General Overseas Service		
Summoned by Bells	22 November – 28 November 1960	BBC Third Programme	Series one; three programmes	
"On Railways in the South"	12 February 1961	BBC Network Three		
"The Eye-Witness"	11 March 1961	BBC Home Service		
"The Eye-Witness"	30 September 1961	BBC Home Service		
"Portrait of Martin Wilson"	11 March 1962	BBC West of England Home Service		
"Some Aspects of British Snobbery"	18 April 1962	BBC Home Service		
"Royal Academy of the Arts: Annual Dinner"	1 May 1962	BBC Home Service		
"I Remember"	5 June 1962	BBC Home Service		
"Far and Wide"	7 June 1962	BBC South and West Home Service		
"Let's Find Out"	10 August 1962	BBC Light Programme		
The Week's Good Cause	4 November 1962	BBC Home Service		
Woman's Hour	11 December 1962	BBC Light Programme		
In Town Tonight	29 December 1962	BBC Home Service		
"For Your Bookshelf"	11 February 1963	BBC Home Service		
"Famous London Churches"	16 February 1963	BBC General Overseas Service		
"Horizons"	21 March 1963	West of England Home Service		
The Week's Good Cause	7 April 1963	BBC Home Service		
"Turning Points"	7 June 1963	BBC Home Service		
"New Comment"	4 July 1963	BBC Third Programme		
"Hugh Gaitskell: A Radio Portrait"	16 January 1964	BBC Home Service		
"John Betjeman"	15 June 1964	BBC Home Service	Betjeman introduced the programme, which consisted of his poetry set to music	
The Week's Good Cause	6 September 1964	BBC Home Service		
"Frankly Speaking"	23 October 1964	BBC Home Service		
"Conservatories and Other Edwardiana: An Exercise in Nostalgia"	27 December 1964	BBC Third Programme		
The News	5 January 1965	BBC Home Service	Betjeman offered an appreciation on T. S. Eliot	
"Holiday Books"	21 July 1965	BBC Home Service		
"Time and the River"	19 August 1965	BBC Home Service		
"T.E. Brown"	2 October 1965	BBC Third Programme	An appreciation of T.E. Brown	
Britain's Cathedrals and Their Music	19 November 1965 – 1 April 1966	BBC Radio 3	Series of 19 programmes	
"For Ever England	27 December 1965	BBC Third Programme		
The Week's Good Cause	15 May 1966	BBC Home Service		
The Week's Good Cause	4 September 1966	BBC Home Service		
"Louise MacNeice"	7 September 1966	BBC Home Service		
"The World of Books"	1 November 1966	BBC Home Service		
"Evelyn Waugh"	9 August 1967	BBC Third Programme		
Choirs and the Places Where They Sing	20 August – 29 October 1967	BBC Radio 3	Series of nine programmes	
Scenes That Are Brightest	16 June 1968 – 23 March 1969	BBC Radio 4	Series of four programmes	
"Betjeman's Dickens"	9 June 1970	BBC Radio 4		
"Options"	19 July 1970	BBC Radio 4		
"Tennyson: Portrait of a Poet"	12 February 1970	BBC Radio 4		
"A Choice of Paperback"	4 August 1971	BBC Radio 4		
"Sir John Betjeman and Alan Pryce-Jones"	25 December 1971	BBC Radio 3		
"Sir Maurice Bowra"	7 April 1972	BBC Radio 3		
Poetry Prom	20 June 1972 – 25 August 1976	BBC Radio 4	Betjeman appeared in nine episodes	
"The Week's Good Cause"	2 July 1972	BBC Radio 4		
"Now Read On"	5 July 1972	BBC Radio 4		
"Portrait in a Place: William Morris"	6 August 1972	BBC Radio 4		
"Larkin at Fifty"	9 August 1972	BBC Radio 3		
"The Incomparable Max"	27 August 1972	BBC Radio 3		
"Tennyson Eighty Years On"	8 December 1972	BBC Radio 3		
"Victorian Knights"	12 August 1973	BBC Radio 3		
"A Portrait of Lord Berners"	15 December 1973	BBC Radio 3		
"Forty Years On"	29 December 1973	BBC Radio 4		
"Heroes From the Halls"	7 January 1974	BBC Radio 4		
"Can't Put it Down"	20 February 1974	BBC Radio 4		
"Sir John Betjeman"	23 December 1974	BBC Radio 4		
Desert Island Discs	12 April 1975	BBC Radio 4		
Sweet Songs of Zion	6 July – 14 September 1975	BBC Radio 4	Series one; six episodes	
Sir John Betjeman: Earlier and Later Loves	12 November – 17 December 1975	BBC Radio 4	Series of six programmes	
"The Young Idea"	1 May 1976	BBC Radio 3		
The Week's Good Cause	20 June 1974	BBC Radio 4		
Sweet Songs of Zion	18 July – 12 September 1976	BBC Radio 4	Series two; 11 episodes	
Kaleidoscope	17 August 1976	BBC Radio 4		
"Betjeman at 70"	28 August 1976	BBC Radio 3		
"Betjemania"	26 December 1976	BBC Radio 4		
"Hymns Ancient and Modern"	12 June 1977	BBC Radio 4		
"Hymns Ancient and Modern"	19 June 1977	BBC Radio 4		
Kaleidoscope	23 June 1977	BBC Radio 4		
Sweet Songs of Zion	2 August – 6 September 1978	BBC Radio 4	Series three; six episodes	
Kaleidoscope	7 December 1978	BBC Radio 4		
Summoned by Bells	9 April 1979	BBC Radio 3		
Summoned by Bells	19 April 1979	BBC Radio 3		
"Books, Plays, Poems: Set Poets"	2 May 1979	BBC Radio 4		
Woman's Hour	15 June 1979	BBC Radio 4		
"With Great Pleasure"	22 December 1979	BBC Radio 4		
Bookshelf: "The Poems of John Betjeman"	28 December 1980	BBC Radio 4	Included an interview with Betjeman	

== Books ==
Non-fiction work by Betjeman
Title	Year of first publication	First edition publisher (London, unless otherwise stated)	Notes	Ref.
Ghastly Good Taste	1933	Chapman & Hall		
Devon	1936	Architectural Press	Part of the Shell Guides series	
An Oxford University Chest	1938	John Miles	includes photographs by László Moholy-Nagy and illustrations by Osbert Lancaster and Edward Bradley	
A Handbook on Paint	1939	The Silicate Paint Co	Co-author with Hugh Casson	
Antiquarian Prejudice	1939	Hogarth Press		
Vintage London	1942	William Collins, Sons		
English Cities and Small Towns	1943	William Collins, Sons		
John Piper	1944	Penguin Books		
Five Sermons by Laymen	1946	St Matthew's Church, Northampton	Co-authored with C. S. Lewis and others	
Murray's Buckinghamshire Architectural Guide	1948	John Murray	Co-authored with John Piper	
Murray's Berkshire Architectural Guide	1949	John Murray	Co-authored with John Piper	
Studies in the History of Swindon	1950	Swindon Borough Council, Swindon	Co-authored with L. V. Grinsell, H. B. Wells and H. S. Tallamy	
Shropshire – with maps and illustrations	1951	Faber & Faber	Part of the Shell Guides series	
The English Scene	1951	Cambridge University Press, Cambridge		
First and Last Loves	1952	John Murray		
Gala Day London	1953	Harvill Secker		
The English Town in the Last Hundred Years	1956	Cambridge University Press, Cambridge	The Rede Lecture	
Some Immortal Hours	1957	John Murray	Twenty copies	
Collins Guide to English Parish Churches, including the Isle of Man	1958	William Collins, Sons		
Ground Plan to City Skyline	1960	Newman Neame	Published under the name "Richard M Farren"	
Clifton College Buildings	1962	Vista Books		
English Churches	1964	Vista Books	Co-authored with Basil Clarke	
The City of London Churches	1965	Pitkin Pictorials	One of Pitkin Pride of Britain series	
Collins Pocket Guide to English Parish Churches	1968	Collins Publishers	Two volumes	
Victorian and Edwardian London From Old Photographs	1969	Batsford Books		
Ten Wren Churches	1970	Editions Elector	Limited edition of 100 copies	
Victorian and Edwardian Brighton From Old Photographs	1971	Batsford Books	Co-authored with J.S. Gray	
A Pictorial History of English Architecture	1972	John Murray		
London's Historic Railway Stations	1972	John Murray		
Victorian and Edwardian Oxford From Old Photographs	1972	Batsford Books	Co-authored with David Vaisey	
West Country Churches	1973	Society of Sts Peter & Paul		
A Plea for Holy Trinity Church, Sloane Street	1974	Church Literature Association		
Victorian and Edwardian Cornwall From Old Photographs	1974	Batsford Books	Co-authored with A. L. Rowse	
Archie and the Strict Baptists	1977	John Murray		
Metro-land	1977	Warren Editions		
John Betjeman's Letters: Volume One	1994	Methuen Publishing	Edited and introduced by Betjeman's daughter, Candida Lycett Green	
John Betjeman's Letters: Volume Two	1995	Methuen Publishing	Edited and introduced by Betjeman's daughter, Candida Lycett Green	
John Betjeman Coming Home	1997	Methuen Publishing		
Trains and Buttered Toast: Betjeman's best BBC radio talks	2006	John Murray	Edited and introduced by Stephen Games	
Tennis Whites and Teacakes: An anthology of Betjeman's prose, verse and occasional writing	2007	John Murray	Edited and introduced by Stephen Games	
Sweet Songs of Zion: Betjeman's radio programmes about English hymn-writing	2007	Hodder & Stoughton	Edited and introduced by Stephen Games	
Betjeman's England: Betjeman's best topographical television programmes	2009	John Murray	Edited and introduced by Stephen Games	

== Editor ==
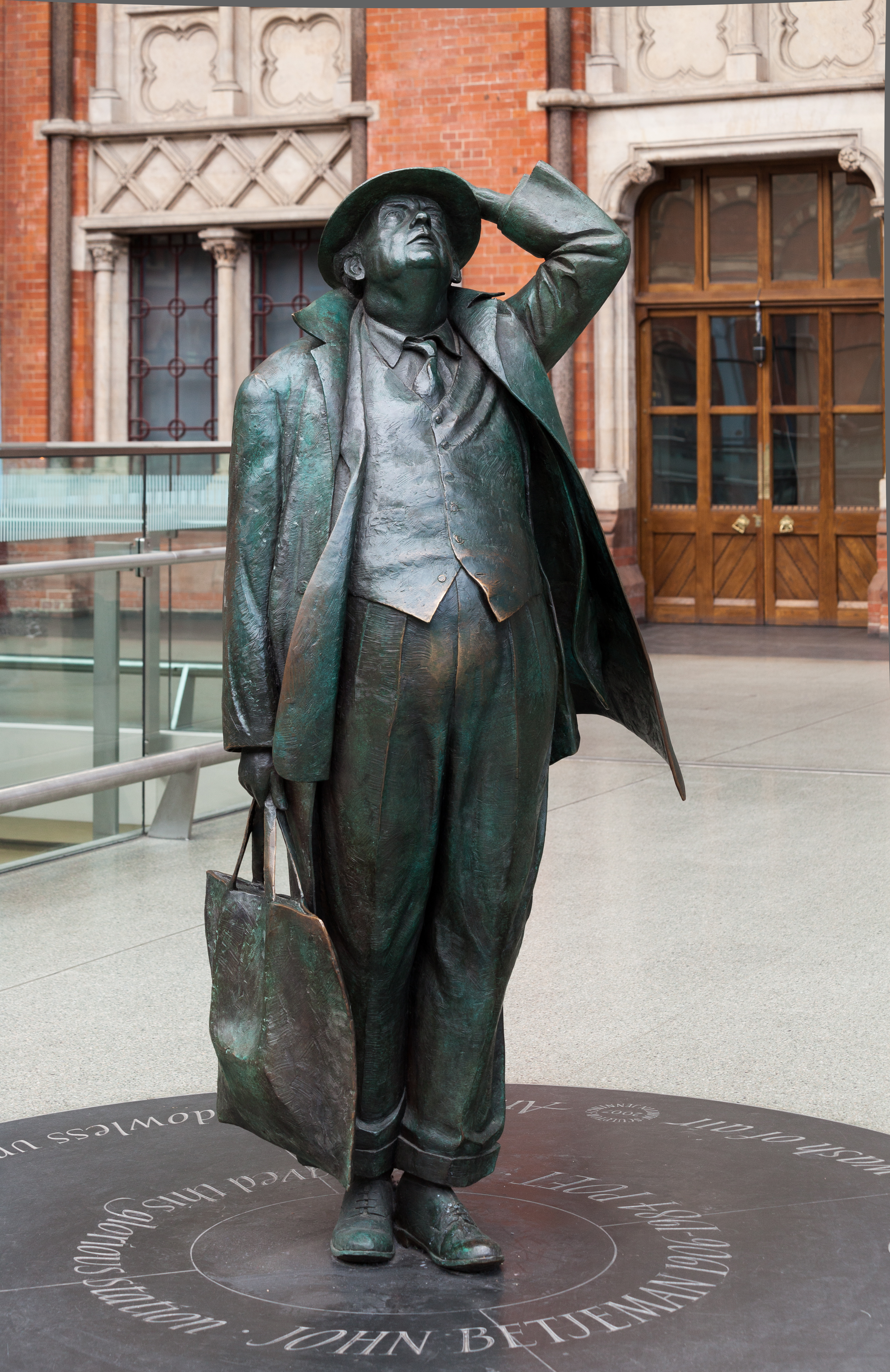
Betjeman's statue at St Pancras railway station

Betjeman undertook the role of editor for several magazines and journals, including the undergraduate magazines of Oxford Outlook and Cherwell; the following consists of the books he edited.

Works which Betjeman edited
Title	Year of first publication	Author	First edition publisher (London, unless otherwise stated)	Notes	Ref.
Cornwall Illustrated	1934	–	Architectural Press	Part of the Shell Guides series	
English Scottish and Welsh Landscape 1700–1860	1944	Various	Frederick Muller Ltd	with Geoffrey Taylor	
Watergate Children's Classics	1947	Various	Watergate Classics		
English Love Poems	1957	Various	Faber and Faber	with Geoffrey Taylor; also a contributor	
An American's Guide to English Parish Churches, Including the Isle of Man	1958	–	McDowell, Obolensky, New York		
Altar and Pew: Church of England Verses	1959	Various	E Hulton & Co		
A Hundred Sonnets	1960	Charles Tennyson Turner	Rupert Hart-Davis	Also wrote introduction	
A Wealth of Poetry	1963	Various	Blackwell Publishing, Oxford	with Winnifred Hindley	
Selected Poems	1978	John Masefield	Heinemann		

== Television ==
Television appearances of Betjeman
Programme	Date	Channel	Role	Notes	Ref.
How to Make a Guidebook	21 September 1937	BBC	Presenter		
Tactile Bee	20 December 1938	BBC	Participant		
Longleat	20 June 1949	BBC	–	As a consultant only	
Readers and Writers	5 June 1951	BBC	Co-presenter		
Conversation Piece	2 March 1954	BBC	Presenter		
Where on Earth?	8 July 1954	BBC	Traveller		
Music From the Castle	17 October 1954	BBC	Commentator		
Christian Forum	21 November 1954	BBC	Participant		
Wells Cathedral	1 April 1955	BBC	Presenter		
Panorama	25 April 1955	BBC	Participant		
St Paul's Cathedral	29 May 1955	BBC	Narrator		
Panorama	29 May 1955	BBC	Participant		
Discovering Britain	23 September 1955 – 30 March 1956	ITV	Presenter	Series of 17 short films, on behalf of Shell Oil; also writer	
Panorama	5 December 1955	BBC	Participant		
Robert Adam: Architect to an Age of Elegance	31 January 1956	BBC	Presenter		
Church in Action	27 August 1956	BBC	Presenter		
The Englishman's Home	9 July – 5 September 1957	BBC	Presenter	Series of six programmes	
Tonight	16 September 1957	BBC	Interviewee		
Youth Wants to Know	3 December 1957	ITV	Participant		
Press Conference	17 January 1958	BBC	Participant		
About Religion	19 January 1958	ITV	Participant		
Press Conference	14 March 1958	BBC	Participant		
Meeting Point	8 June 1958 – 29 August 1965	BBC	Participant	Betjeman appeared in nine episodes of the programme	
Panorama	30 June 1958	BBC	Participant		
Tonight	8 December 1958	BBC	Interviewee		
About Religion	8 December 1958	ITV	Participant		
Mainly for Women: Wednesday Magazine	18 February 1959	BBC	Participant		
Monitor: John Betjeman, A Poet in London	1 March 1959	BBC	Participant		
Tonight	6 March 1959	BBC	Participant		
The Royal Scottish Academy	6 July 1959	BBC	Participant		
Beauty in Trust	4 August 1959	BBC	Narrator	Also writer	
Viewpoint	9 September 1959	BBC	Participant		
Viewpoint	4 November 1959	BBC	Participant		
Journey into a Lost World	1960	BBC	Narrator	Also writer	
Remembering Summer	19 January 1960	BBC	Participant		
Monitor	28 February 1960	BBC	Participant		
A Journey into the Weald	26 June 1960	BBC	Narrator		
John Betjeman as the Book Man	11 September 1960 – 8 January 1961	ITV	Presenter	Series of nine programmes	
About Religion	18 September 1960	ITV	Participant		
Wednesday Magazine	30 November 1960 – 6 December 1961	BBC	Participant	Betjeman made four appearances in the series	
John Betjeman and the Book Man	8 January 1961	ITV	Presenter		
John Betjeman Goes by Train	17 April 1961	BBC	Presenter		
Enjoying Life	1962	BBC	Presenter	Produced by the Labour Party	
Steam and Stained Glass	2 April – 16 April 1962	ITV	Presenter	Series of three programmes	
Perspective on Eccentricity	31 May 1962	BBC	Presenter		
In View: Men of Steam	26 September 1962	BBC	Presenter	Also writer	
Perspective	17 January 1963	BBC	Participant		
Sing a Song of Sixpence	22 January – 19 February 1963	ITV	Presenter	Series of three programmes	
Let's Imagine a Branch Line Railway	29 March 1963	BBC	Presenter		
The Muse in SW1	17 July 1963	BBC	Participant		
Seeing and Believing: In Populous City Pent	6 October 1963	BBC	Reader		
One Man's County	22 January 1964	BBC	Presenter		
Something About Diss	25 March 1964	BBC	Narrator		
High Mass	26 July 1964	BBC	Participant		
Writer's World	5 October 1964	BBC	Participant		
Monitor	15 December 1964	BBC	Presenter		
Panorama	21 December 1964	BBC	Participant		
Christmas Carols	24 December 1964	BBC	Presenter		
Swann, Wallace and Betjeman	25 December 1964	BBC	Participant		
Monitor	29 December 1964	BBC	Participant		
A Thousand Years From Milton—from Milton Abbey	3 March 1965	BBC	Presenter		
Muses with Milligan	3 March 1965	BBC	Participant		
Pity About the Abbey	29 July 1965	BBC	Co-writer	Play, co-written with Stewart Farrar	
BBC 3	29 January 1966	BBC	Guest		
Late Show London	18 February 1966		Interviewee		
A Man With a View	19 April 1966	BBC	Presenter		
Footprints	15 May 1966	BBC	Narrator	Also writer (in verse)	
Late Night Line-Up	31 July 1966	BBC	Interviewee		
Betjeman at Random	1 August – 22 August 1966	ITV	Interviewer	Series of four programmes	
Pride of Place	1 August 1966 – 20 August 1967	BBC	Participant	Series of nine programmes	
The Frost Programme	2 December 1966	ITV	Interviewee		
The Founder: The Story of Lancing College	9 December 1966	BBC	Presenter		
Journey to Bethlehem	26 December 1966	BBC	Presenter		
Betjeman's London	14 August – 18 September 1967	BBC	Presenter	Series of six programmes	
The Picture Theatre	10 October 1967	BBC	Presenter		
The Frost Programme	6 December 1967	ITV	Interviewee		
A Tale of Canterbury	25 December 1967	BBC	Narrator	Also written by Betjeman	
Contrasts	31 January 1968	BBC	Presenter		
Aida	5 February 1968	BBC	Presenter		
Omnibus	2 April 1968	BBC	Participant		
Summer '67	8 April 1968	BBC	Narrator		
The Morning Service	26 May 1968	ITV	Participant		
A Portrait of Hardy	27 August 1968	ITV	Participant		
Release: The Weekly Arts Magazine	26 October 1968	BBC	Participant		
Viewpoint	14 November 1968	BBC	Participant		
Frost on Saturday	30 November 1968	ITV	Interviewee		
Contrasts	17 December 1968	BBC	Presenter	Also writer	
Bird's-Eye View: The Englishman's Home	5 April 1969 – 18 April 1971	BBC	Presenter	Series of 13 programmes	
A Cathedral for Cornwell	10 April 1969	BBC	Narrator		
Four with Betjeman	29 June – 20 July 1970	BBC	Presenter	Series of four programmes	
Late Night Line-Up	26 October 1970	BBC	Presenter		
Look Stranger: Ellan Vannin	10 December 1970	BBC	Presenter		
An Evening with John Betjeman	24 December 1970	BBC	Presenter		
Aquarius	26 December 1970	ITV	Presenter		
That Well-Known Store in Knightsbridge	1 June 1971	BBC	Presenter		
On Camera: Historic Houses	13 July 1971	BBC	Participant		
Summer Review	13 August 1971	BBC	Presenter		
Omnibus: "Happy Birthday, Dear Albert"	12 September 1971	BBC	Presenter		
Treasures of the British Museum	24 November 1971	ITV	Presenter		
Railways Forever	1 June 1972	BBC	Presenter		
Collector's World	15 August 1972	BBC	Participant		
Betjeman in Australia	13 September – 4 October 1972	BBC	Presenter	Series of four programmes	
Thank God it's Sunday	10 & 17 December 1972	BBC	Narrator		
Parkinson	17 February 1973	BBC	Interviewee		
Metro-Land	26 February 1973	BBC	Presenter	Also writer	
Up Sunday	27 May 1973	BBC	Participant		
A Chance to Meet	16 September 1973	BBC	Guest		
Nationwide	19 March 1974	BBC	Interviewee		
Aquarius	26 May 1974	ITV	Participant		
A Passion for Churches	7 December 1974	BBC	Narrator	Also writer	
Sir John Betjeman	15 June 1975	BBC	Presenter	Five-minute appeal on behalf of St Anne's Cathedral, Belfast	
The Book Programme	30 September 1975	BBC	Presenter		
Just a Nimmo	28 January 1976	BBC	Interviewee		
Vicar of the Parish	29 July 1976	BBC	Narrator	Also writer	
Summoned by Bells	29 August 1976	BBC	Presenter	Also writer	
Betjeman's Belfast	12 November 1976	BBC	Presenter		
The Enthusiast	22 December 1976	BBC	Presenter		
Anyone for Tennyson?	16 March 1977	Nebraska Educational Telecommunications	Presenter		
Betjeman and Friends	12 & 19 April 1977	ITV	Presenter		
The Queen's Realm: A Prospect of England	31 May 1977	BBC	Presenter	Also writer	
Parkinson	5 November 1977	BBC	Interviewee		
The Bold Red Baronet	6 January 1978	BBC	Participant		
Read All About It	2 April 1978	BBC	Interviewee		
John Betjeman's Dublin	30 November 1978	BBC	Presenter	Also writer	
The Innes Book of Records	17 January & 21 February 1979	BBC	Participant		
Tonight in Town	1 June 1979	BBC	Participant		
Arena: "Private Life of the Ford Cortina"	19 January 1982	BBC	Participant		
Time with Betjeman	13 February – 27 March 1983	BBC	Participant	Series of seven programmes	
The Architect of Civic Pride	4 May 1984	BBC	Participant		

== Discography ==
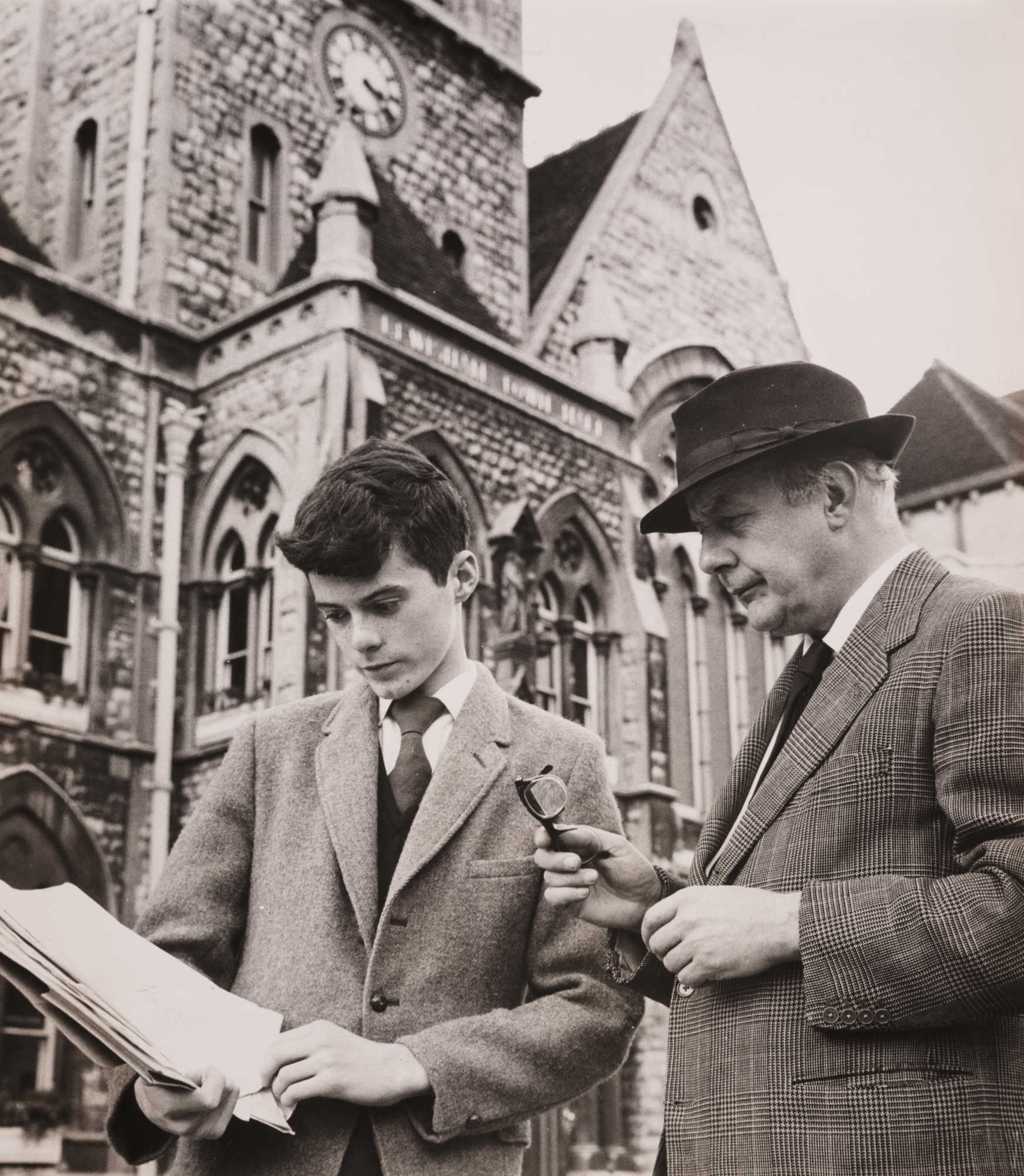
Betjeman reads William Norton's petition to Save Lewisham Town Hall, 1961

LP recordings by Betjeman
Album	Year	Label	Notes
The Golden Treasury of John Betjeman	1956	Argo Records	
The Story of Jesus	1960	London Talking Book Co	
Betjeman Reads Betjeman	1961	Argo Records	
Banana Blush	1974	Virgin Records	With musical accompaniment from Jim Parker
Late Flowering Love	1974	Virgin Records	With musical accompaniment from Jim Parker
Hans Christian Andersen's Fairy Tales	1975	Pye Records	Betjeman and Dame Edith Evans reading the stories
Elizabeth II: The Woman and the Queen	1977	Argo Records	
The World of John Betjeman	1977	Argo Records	
Sir John Betjeman's Britain	1977	Virgin Records	With musical accompaniment from Jim Parker
Varsity Rag	1981	Virgin Records	With musical accompaniment from Jim Parker

== Notes and references ==
=== Sources ===
- Amis, Kingsley; Loughlin-Chow, M. Clare (2004). "Betjeman, Sir John (1906–1984)". Oxford Dictionary of National Biography (online ed.). Oxford University Press. doi:10.1093/ref:odnb/30815. (Subscription, Wikipedia Library access or UK public library membership required.)
- Betjeman, John (2006). Games, Stephen (ed.). Trains and Buttered Toast. London: John Murray. ISBN 978-0-7195-6126-9.
- Betjeman, John (2007). Games, Stephen (ed.). Sweet Songs of Zion. London: Hodder & Stoughton. ISBN 978-0-340-96388-3.
- Betjeman, John (2009). Games, Stephen (ed.). Betjeman's England. London: John Murray. ISBN 978-1-84854-091-0.
- Brown, Geoffrey (May 1985). "John Betjeman". The Book and Magazine Collector (15). Diamond Publishing Group.
- Clarke, John (1983). "John Betjeman". In Stanford, Donald E (ed.). British Poets, 1914–1945. Detroit: Gale Research. ISBN 978-0-8103-1702-4.
- Nudd, Kevin (March 1992). "John Betjeman". The Book and Magazine Collector (96). Diamond Publishing Group.
- Peterson, William (2006). John Betjeman: A Bibliography. Oxford: Clarendon Press. ISBN 978-0-1981-8403-4.
- Robinson, Paul (July 1998). "John Betjeman". The Book and Magazine Collector (172). Diamond Publishing Group.
- Wilson, A.N. (2006). Betjeman. London: Random House. ISBN 978-0-091-79702-7.
