= BBC National Programme =

Former British national radio service (1930–1939)

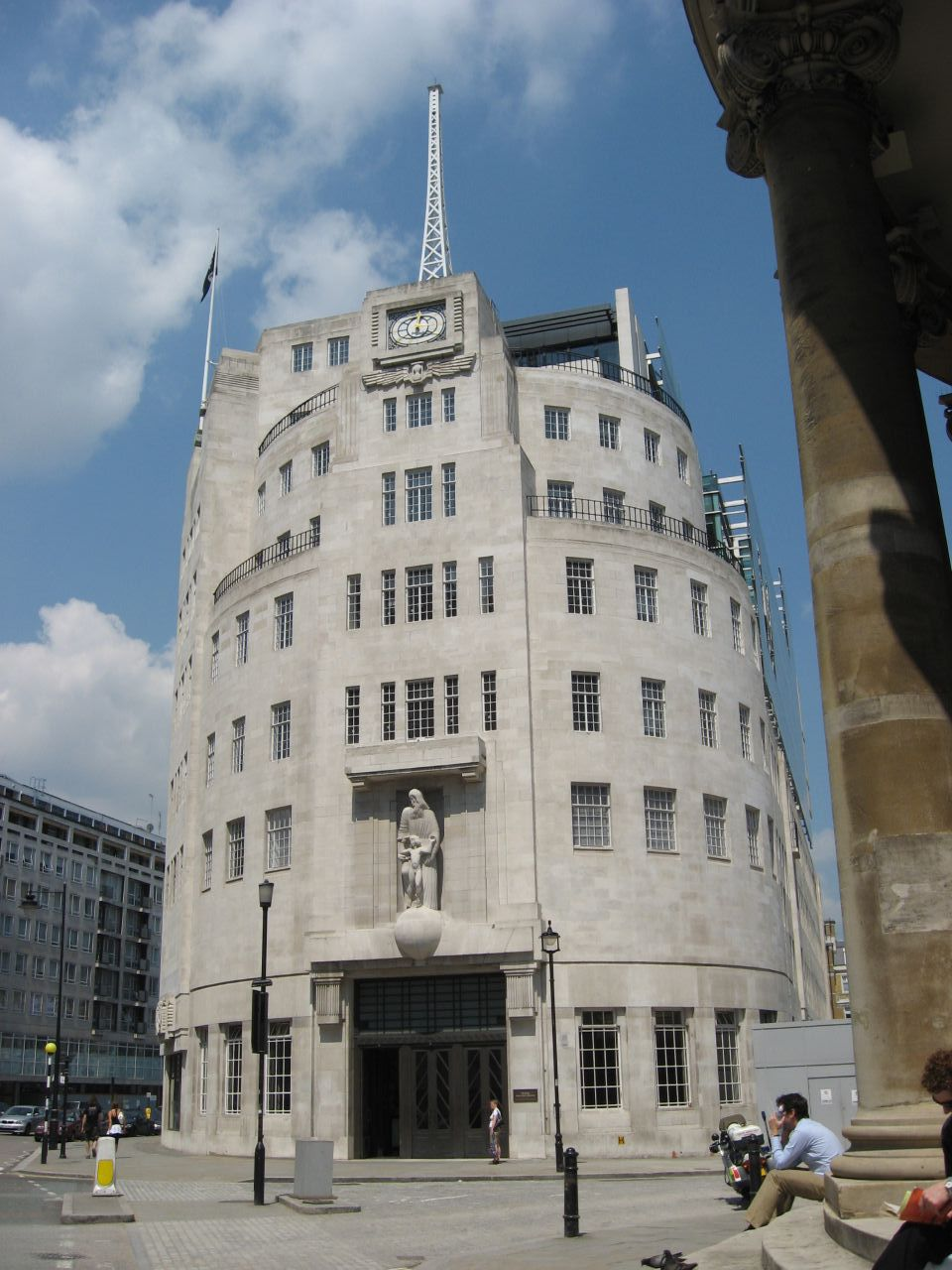
- The National Programme headquarters was at Broadcasting House in Central London.
- Country: United Kingdom
- Radio transmitters: Droitwich 200 kHz; Brookmans Park 1149 kHz; Moorside Edge 1149 kHz; Westerglen 1149 kHz
- Headquarters: Broadcasting House, London, England
- Owner: BBC
- Established: 9 March 1930; 96 years ago
- Dissolved: 31 August 1939; 87 years ago
- Language: English
- Replaced: 5XX
- Replaced by: BBC Home Service; BBC Radio 4

The BBC National Programme was a radio service which was on the air from 9 March 1930 – replacing the earlier BBC's experimental station 5XX – until 1 September 1939 when it was subsumed into the BBC Home Service, two days before the outbreak of World War II.

Both the National Programme and the Regional Programme provided a mixed mainstream radio service. Whilst the two services provided different programming, allowing listeners a choice they were not streamed to appeal to different audiences, rather they were intended to offer a choice of programming to a single audience. While using the same transmitters, the National Programme broadcast significantly more speech and classical music than its successor, the BBC Light Programme. Similarly, the Regional Programme broadcast much more light and dance music than its successor, the Home Service.

== History ==
=== Development ===
When the British Broadcasting Company (later to be nationalised as the British Broadcasting Corporation) began transmissions on 14 November 1922, the technology for both national coverage and joint programming between transmitters did not exist – transmitter powers were generally in the region of 1 kilowatt (kW).

From 9 July 1924, however the company began experimenting with higher power longwave transmissions from the Marconi Company's site near Chelmsford in Essex, using the call sign 5XX. The experiments proved successful and on 27 July 1925, the Chelmsford longwave transmitter was relocated to a more central site at Borough Hill near Daventry in Northamptonshire. This provided a "national service" of programmes originating in London, although it remained somewhat experimental and was supplementary to the BBC's locally based services including its main station, 2LO.

Initially, it was transmitted on 187.5 kHz longwave; this was later changed, with the opening of a new high-power longwave transmitter site at Droitwich to 200 kHz on 7 October 1934. This remained the frequency for the National Programme, through its successors the BBC Home Service and BBC Radio 4, which moved its frequency slightly to 198 kHz on 1 February 1988, where it remained until longwave service closed in June 2026. Medium wave transmitters were used to augment coverage.

=== Regional scheme ===
On 21 August 1927, the BBC opened a high-power medium wave transmitter at the Daventry 5GB site to replace the existing local stations in the English Midlands, that allowed the experimental longwave transmitter 5XX to provide a service programmed from London for the majority of the population, this came to be called the National Programme.

By combining the resources of the local stations into one regional station in each area with a basic sustaining service from London, the BBC hoped to increase programme quality whilst also centralising the management of the radio service known as the "regional scheme", and eventually resulted in the gradual extension throughout the decade of a separate Regional Programme.

The local stations were gradually either converted to regional relays or closed entirely and replaced by high-power Regional Programme transmitters. Some local studios were retained to provide for programming from specific areas within each region. Most transmitters also carried the National Programme on a local frequency to supplement the longwave broadcasts from 5XX, initially these were on three separate frequencies in order to minimise interference. By 1939 as the Regional Programme network expanded, the three remaining medium wave transmitters – at Brookmans Park (for London and the South East), Moorside Edge (for the North), and Westerglen (for central Scotland) – were all using 1149 kHz.

=== Broadcasting hours ===
The National Programme's broadcasting hours were from Mondays to Saturdays at around 10.15 am until midnight, with Sundays commence broadcasting at 3.00 pm. However, by the mid-1930s, broadcasting on a Sunday was extended to commence at around 10.30 am.

BBC News on the National Programme would not air until at least 6.00 pm each day, this was in agreement with several newspapers to ensure people would buy a morning edition. Thus they did not have a dedicated news department until 1934, and only then was it used to edit and broadcast news material from other wire agencies in the country and around the world. The start of World War II on 1 September 1939 would see the start of a proper news on the new BBC Home Service, with morning news bulletins commencing at 7.00 am each day.

=== Closure ===
Upon the outbreak of World War II, the BBC closed both existing National and Regional radio programmes to replace them with a single channel known as the BBC Home Service. The main transmitter network was synchronised between just two groups, using 668 and 767 kHz, each of which could be turned off during air raids to prevent their signals being used as navigational beacons (with listeners required to retune in such an event to a low-powered single-frequency network on 1474 kHz).

On 29 July 1945, within 12 weeks of Victory in Europe Day, the BBC reactivated the Regional Programme but retained the name "Home Service" (until 30 September 1967 as the station became BBC Radio 4). On the same date, the BBC Light Programme was launched by taking over the style and much of the function as an entertainment channel of the BBC Forces Programme which had begun broadcasting on 7 January 1940, as well as the Droitwich 200 kHz longwave frequency which had been used by the pre-war National Programme.

== Sources ==
=== Further reading ===
- The BBC Year-book 1933. London: BBC. 1933. OCLC 867862862.
- The BBC Year Book 1947. London: BBC. 1948. OCLC 770477752.
- Graham, Russ J (15 August 2001). "A local service". Transdiffusion Broadcasting System.
- Graham, Russ J (15 August 2001). "A new lease of life". Transdiffusion Broadcasting System.
- Groves, Paul (2004). "History of Radio Transmission in the UK" (PDF). Frequency Finder (published May 2016).
- Paulu, Burton (1967). Radio and Television Broadcasting on the European Continent. Minneapolis: University of Minnesota Press. ISBN 9780816660469. OCLC 503607289 – via Google Books.
- Briggs, Asa (1995). The History of Broadcasting in the United Kingdom: Volume II: The Golden Age of the Wireless. Oxford University Press. ISBN 0-19-212930-9 – via Google Books.
