= Molly Brownless =

British television camera operator

- Born: Molly Heritage; 1920; Castle Bromwich
- Died: 2021 (aged 100–101)
- Occupation: Camera operator
- Employer: BBC
- Television: Coppelia 30 June 1947

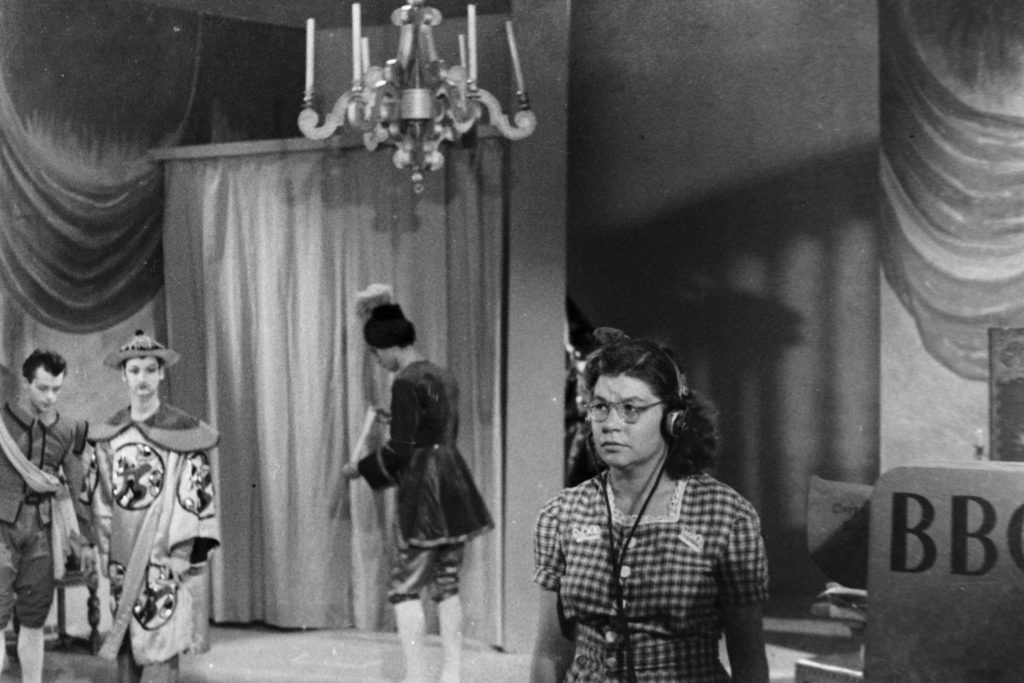
Molly Brownless camera operator. From a production of “Coppelia: Act 2” – 30 Jun 1947, featuring The Metropolitan Ballet.

Molly Brownless (née Heritage, later Frood) was the first female television camera operator at the first BBC studies at Alexandra Palace. She operated an Emitron camera in Studio B on the day the BBC studios opened after the Second World War in June 1946, the day before the London Victory Parade. She continued to operate these cameras for the next 2 years.

== Early life ==
Molly Heritage was born in 1920 in Castle Bromwich in the West Midlands Mr & Mrs Thomas Heritage. Her father was an engineer. She later attended Erdington Secondary School and sang in the Birmingham City Choir.

== Early career ==
Molly was an engineer who initially worked with radio transmitters at Droitwich transmitting station during World War II, where she dealt with big pieces of equipment. She married a BBC research engineer and was known as Molly Frood during her time at the BBC.

== Work at the BBC ==
Molly worked at the BBC from 1946 to 1948. She bagen work at Alexandra Palace in April 1946. She was the first woman camera operator and was later joined by another woman called Bimbi Harris. The BBC camera operators wanted an upgrade to their job description so that they would be paid better, but the Association of Cine-Technicians considered the fact that women could be camera operators proved that it was not a very skilled job, and it would therefore be difficult to argue that they should be upgraded. So women camera operators were told they could no longer do camera work and were moved to vision mixing.

== Career after BBC ==
After Molly left the BBC she emigrated to Australia in 1951 and worked for TCN9 while the station was still being tested and when few of her colleagues had experience in television engineering.

She had a daughter Eileen.
