= Daventry transmitting station =

Former major transmitter array

Coordinates: 52.2542°N 1.1401°W

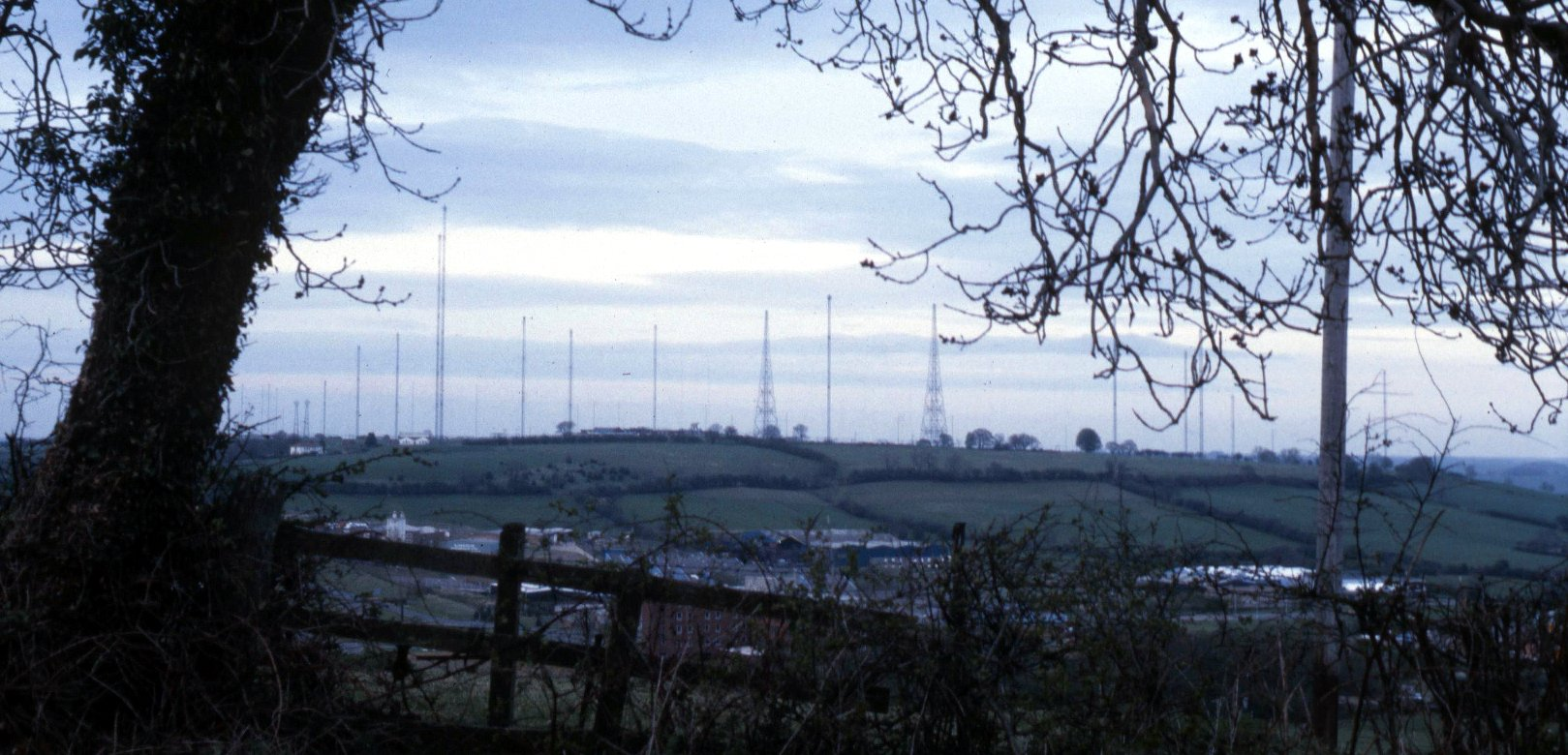
Daventry transmitting station viewed from the south in about 1990

The Daventry transmitting station was a major broadcasting facility located on Borough Hill on the outskirts of Daventry, Northamptonshire. It operated from 1925 until 1992, carrying long-wave, medium-wave, and short-wave broadcasts at different times in its history. In its heyday the site had more than 40 masts and towers on an antenna field extending over hundreds of acres. Since 1992, only DAB services have been broadcast from the site using a single mast. All other antennas have been demolished.

== Long-wave transmitter ==
During 1923, the British Broadcasting Company's chief engineer, Peter Eckersley, deduced that it would be possible to provide a broadcast service to most of the United Kingdom using a single high-power long-wave transmitter located in central England. A 50-acre site on Borough Hill was acquired by the BBC for this purpose. A T-aerial was suspended between two masts, each 500 ft high and spaced by 800 ft.

The Daventry transmitter took over from Chelmsford on 27 July 1925, radiating with a power of 25 kW. The initial frequency was 187.5 kHz, but this was changed to 187 kHz in 1927, 193 kHz in 1929, and finally 200 kHz in 1934. The long-wave transmitter was replaced from 7 October 1934 by a higher-powered one at the Droitwich transmitting station in Worcestershire.

The Empire Short Wave Service, which later became the BBC World Service, started in 1932.

For its long-wave transmissions the station used the same 5XX call sign as its experimental predecessor sited at Chelmsford, although from 9 March 1930 this was replaced in all on-air and other announcements by the new name bestowed from that date upon the service broadcast principally via long-wave from Daventry: the BBC National Programme.
