= Moorside Edge =

Moorland in West Yorkshire, England

Coordinates: 53.63508°N 1.89561°W

Moorside Edge shown within West Yorkshire
(grid reference SE070154)

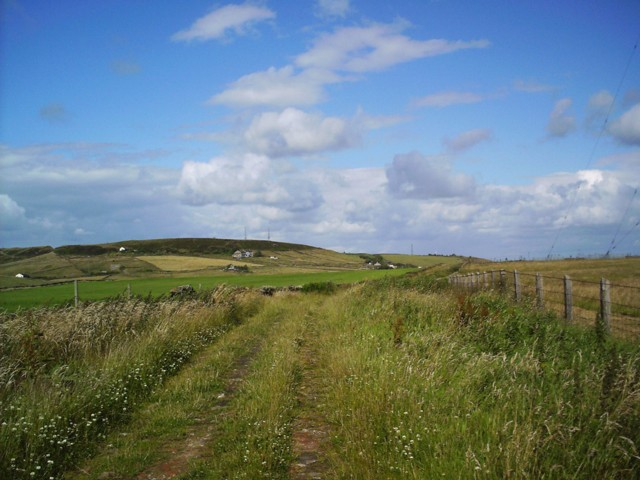
Crimea Lane running along the western edge of Moorside Edge

The Moorside Edge is a steeply sloping area of moorland at grid reference SE070154 just north of Slaithwaite and about 5 miles (8 km) west of Huddersfield in the Kirklees District of West Yorkshire, England. It descends from the relatively flat summit of Pole Moor into the valley of the River Colne.

Just above the edge itself is the Moorside Edge transmitting station.
