= Brookmans Park transmitting station =

Transmitter station in Hertfordshire, England

Brookmans Park
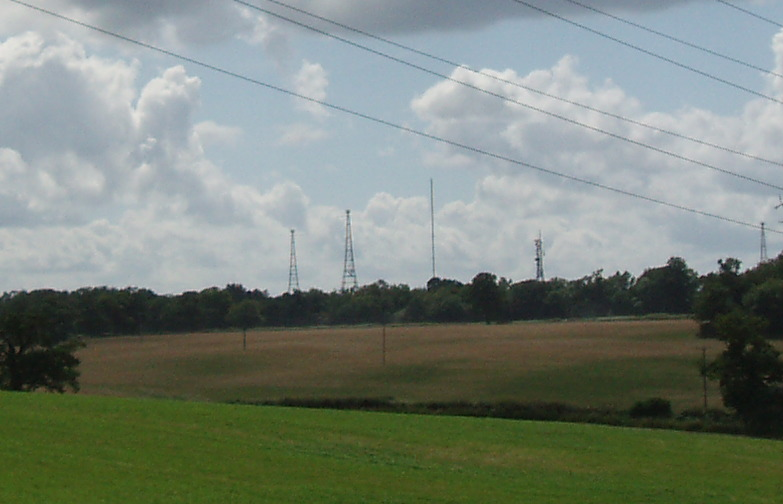

- Location within Hertfordshire
- Mast height: 152 metres (499 ft)
- Coordinates: 51.728889°N 0.1775°W
- Grid reference: TL259050

The Brookmans Park transmitting station is a facility for medium wave (MW) broadcasting at Brookmans Park, Hertfordshire, north of London (grid reference TL259050). The station was built in the 1920s by the BBC as the first of a network of regional dual ("twin wave" was the term then used) transmitter stations, replacing the city-based ones used previously, and this was to cover the Home Counties, London and South East. The station is now owned by Arqiva and transmits BBC Radio 5 Live, talkSPORT and Lyca Radio. Other medium wave broadcasts for London come from the Saffron Green transmitting station, built by the Independent Broadcasting Authority and also in Hertfordshire.

== History ==
The first station, on 842 kHz, (356 m) 50 kW, went into service in on 21 October 1929, the second on 1148 kHz, (261 m) initially 30 kW, followed on 9 March 1930.

The original antenna configuration for the station was two T-antennas hung from four 200-foot (61 m) towers, one T-antenna to the north of the station and the other to the south of the station.

Shortly after the commencement of transmissions, the channels were identified by a name denoting its function. The BBC National Programme was carried on 842 kHz, and the "Regional" service on 1148 kHz.

The transmitting station itself featured the latest transmitters from the Marconi Company. No public electricity supply was available so large generators were installed and an extensive support staff was recruited and trained by the BBC.

Making use of the two stations at the same location, Brookmans Park was used for experimental television broadcasts, providing for the first time in Britain both vision and sound. Between 30 March 1930 and July 1932, television using the 30-line Baird mechanical television system, complete with a separate synchronized sound channel, was broadcast following the end of scheduled radio programmes. In December 1930, half hour long television broadcasts took place in the late morning and on some days also late at night, from Monday to Friday inclusive.

In 1939, a 91.4 m (300 ft) mast was built on the south side of the station, which along with the existing south T-antenna made a directional array pointing towards central London. This antenna configuration would be used after the war for the BBC Light Programme.

During the Second World War an extension was added to the northern side of the transmitter building and a 140 kW STC transmitter was installed.

In the mid-1950s a 152.4 m (500 ft) mast radiator was constructed on a field around one-half mile (800 m) north of station for the BBC Home Service and the original north T-antenna would become a reserve antenna for that service.

The station was re-engineered in the late 1970s and an extra T-antenna (mini T) was hung between two 18.3 m (60 ft) poles constructed a few hundred feet north from the original north T-antenna, and new transmission equipment was installed replacing the original Marconi transmitters, the 140 kW STC transmitter, and other BBC-designed transmission equipment which was installed in the 1960s.

After the re-engineering the south T-antenna and the 91.4 m (300 ft) mast transmitted BBC Radio London and Radio 3; the north T-antenna along with the newly installed mini T-antenna was used for Radio 1, and the 152.4 m (500 ft) mast was used for Radio 2.

In the years since the re-engineering little has changed to the antenna and structure layout of the station, but the services have changed and in the 2010s the station transmitted Absolute Radio instead of Radio 3, Sunrise Radio instead of BBC Radio London, Talksport instead of Radio 1, and BBC Radio 5 Live instead of Radio 2. BBC Radio London also aired on MW from this transmitter between 1972 and 1993.

Much development has taken place and the station is now the home to many communications companies that operate various satellite and communication services.

== Channels listed by frequency ==
=== Analogue radio (AM Medium Wave) ===
| Frequency | kW | Service |
|---|---|---|
| 909 kHz | 200 | BBC Radio 5 Live |
| 1089 kHz | 400 | talkSPORT |
| 1458 kHz | 125 | Lyca Radio |

As of 16:00 on 4 February 2014. Sunrise Radio stopped transmitting. Lyca Media then started transmitting at 23:00 on 1458 kHz. The station was named as Lyca Radio at a later date.

On 20 January 2023, Absolute Radio stopped broadcasting on 1215 kHz, along with all its other AM frequencies across the UK.

=== Digital radio (DAB) ===
| Frequency | Block | kW | Operator |
|---|---|---|---|
| 218.640 MHz | 11B | 2 | DRG London |
| 222.064 MHz | 11D | 1.9 | Digital One |

== See also ==
- List of masts
- List of towers
- List of radio stations in the United Kingdom
