= Moorside Edge transmitting station =

Transmitter station in West Yorkshire, England

Moorside Edge
- Location within West Yorkshire
- Mast height: 158 metres (518 ft)
- Coordinates: 53.635278°N 1.89444°W
- Grid reference: SE070154
- Built: 1930–31

Moorside Edge transmitting station, opened in 1931, was originally constructed to radiate the BBC's North Regional (from 17 May on 626 kHz) and National Programmes (from 12 July on 995 kHz).

It is – at 400 kW – one of the most powerful mediumwave radio transmitters in Britain. Formed of two 158-metre-high steel lattice towers, it is located just above Moorside Edge (grid reference SE070154). Other nearby transmitting stations are Holme Moss (11.56 km, bearing 168.17°) and Emley Moor (15.4 km, bearing 99.41°).

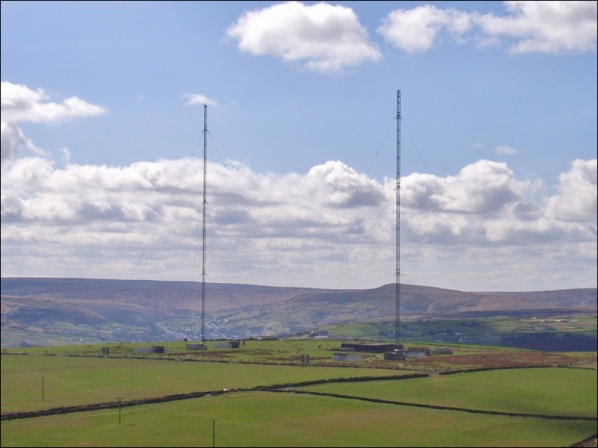
Moorside Edge MW radio transmitter

As with most mediumwave transmitters, a good "signal earth" is important and this is assured by the waterlogged nature of the ground on which it is built. The site's location on the Pennine Hills means that signals from Moorside Edge can be received at very long distances: as far north as Scotland, as far south as the Midlands, as far west as Dublin, and well beyond the country's eastern (North Sea) coast.

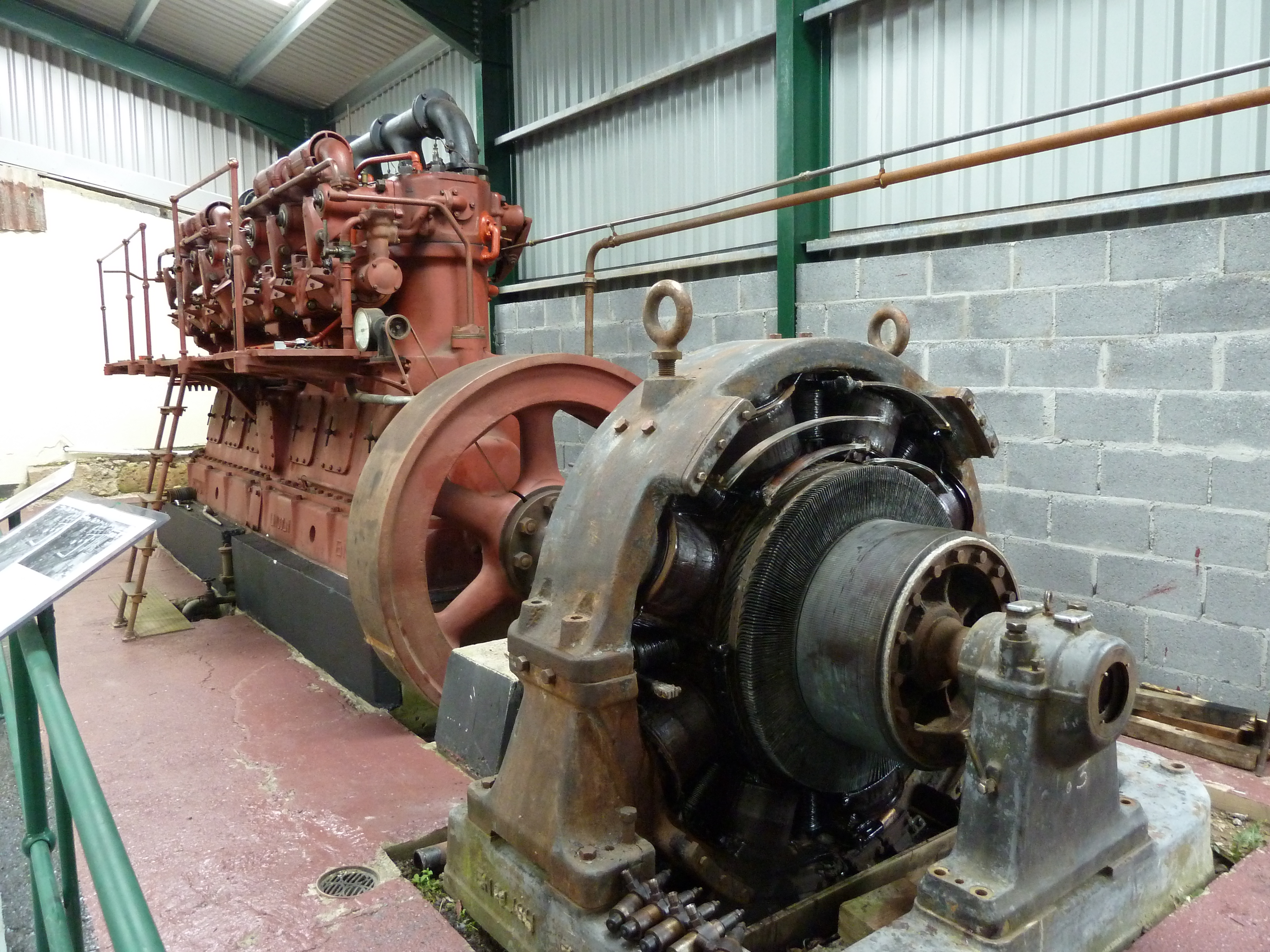
One of the four Ruston generating sets originally installed at Moorside Edge, now preserved at the Internal Fire Museum of Power

The station is now owned and operated by Arqiva and broadcasts the following services:

Frequency	kW	Service
909 kHz	400	BBC Radio 5 Live
1089 kHz	400 (night) 200 (day)	Talksport

Formerly:

Frequency	kW	Service	Ceased
1215 kHz	200	Absolute Radio	20 January 2023

== See also ==
- List of masts
- List of radio stations in the United Kingdom
