= Burghead Transmitting Station =

Transmitter station in Moray, Scotland

Burghead
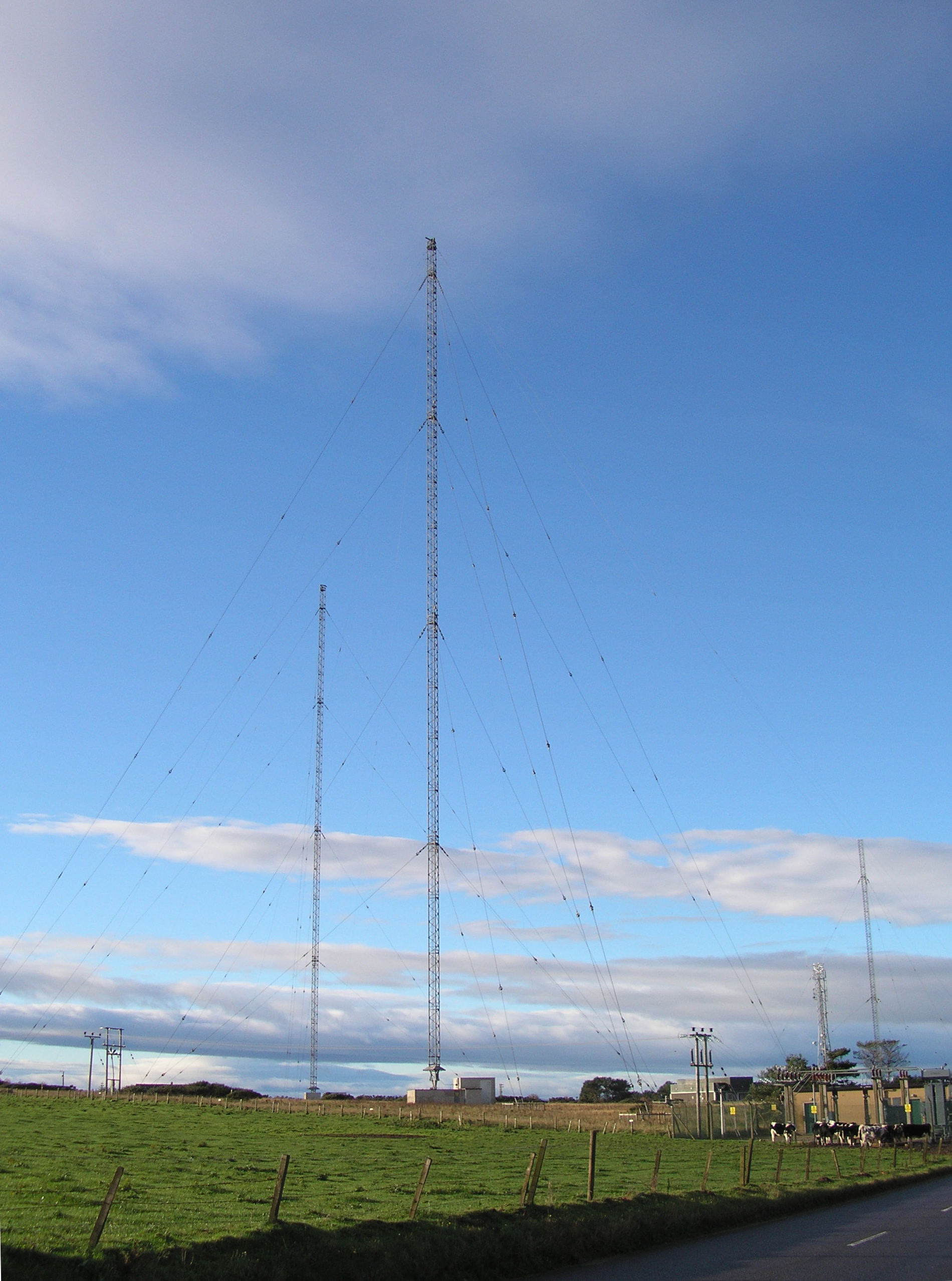
- Burghead masts from the east

- Location within Moray
- Location: Burghead, Moray
- Mast height: 153.6 metres (504 ft) (North); 154.2 metres (506 ft) (South)
- Coordinates: 57.698889°N 3.469722°W
- Grid reference: NJ125685
- Built: 12 October 1936

The Burghead transmitting station is a broadcasting facility near Burghead (grid reference NJ125685) in Scotland for medium wave (as well as long wave until 27 June 2026) radio transmission that started service on 12 October 1936. The site is owned by Arqiva and houses two medium wave radio transmitters, broadcasting BBC Radio 5 Live on 693 kHz and BBC Radio Scotland on 810 kHz.

The long wave transmitter – which latterly broadcast BBC Radio 4 on 198 kHz – was part of a network transmitting on the same frequency, the other transmitters being Droitwich and Westerglen. Transmission of Radio 4 on LW ceased at 01:00 BST on 27 June 2026 and the transmitter itself was shut down on 30 June 2026.

== History ==
It was announced on May 1934. It had been announced earlier that it would be built near Elgin. It would be built nine miles from Elgin, ten miles from Forres. Seven sites were considered. Three new telephone lines from Aberdeen to Elgin opened on 5 October 1934.

Construction was planned to begin in November 1934, but work began on 14 January 1935. It would open on Monday 12 October 1936, by engineer Sir Murdoch Macdonald. His company is today known as Mott MacDonald.

It cost £100,000, being 500ft. The building was 254ft by 93ft, and 29 ft high. The building was designed by Wimperis, Simpson and Guthrie. The generator provided 400kW at 20,000 V.

BBC Radio 4 ceased longwave broadcasting on 27 June 2026 at 01:00 BST, switching over to a looped recording of retuning advice intended to continue broadcasting until 30 June 2026.

== Structure ==
The station has three masts, which are all lattice structures with triangular cross section and insulated against ground. The northern of the two large masts is 153.6 metres (504 ft), the southern large mast is 154.2 metres (506 ft) tall, while the third one is significantly lower. One of the large masts is used for the medium wave transmissions and the other is used for the long wave transmitter. The third and smallest mast is the backup antenna.

The original building was demolished leaving a much smaller building for the more modern transmitters.

== Services available ==
=== Analogue radio (AM medium wave) ===
Frequency	kW	Service
693 kHz	50	BBC Radio 5 Live
810 kHz	100	BBC Radio Scotland

=== Former analogue radio (AM long wave) ===
Frequency	kW	Service	Switch-off date
198 kHz	50	BBC Radio 4	27 June 2026

== See also ==
- Arqiva, who own the site
- List of masts
- List of tallest buildings and structures in Great Britain
- List of radio stations in the United Kingdom
