= BBC Home Service =

Former British national and regional radio station (1939–1967)

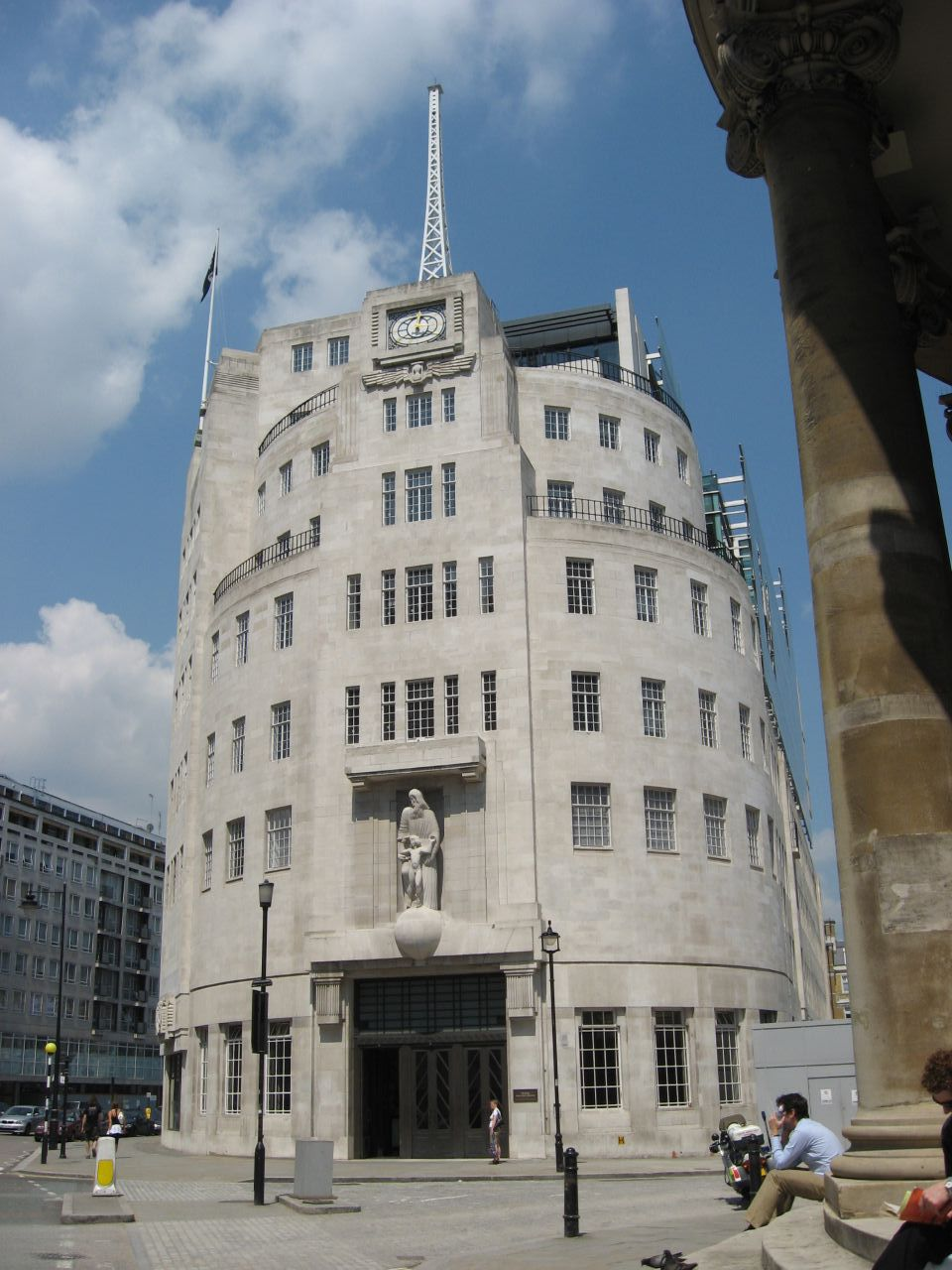
- The Home Service headquarters was at Broadcasting House in London.
- Country: United Kingdom
- Headquarters: Broadcasting House, London, England
- Owner: BBC
- Launch date: 1 September 1939; 86 years ago
- Dissolved: 29 September 1967; 58 years ago
- Language: English
- Replaced: BBC National Programme; BBC Regional Programme
- Replaced by: BBC Radio 4

The BBC Home Service was a national and regional radio station that broadcast from 1939 until 1967, when it was replaced by BBC Radio 4.

== History ==
=== 1922–1939: Interwar period ===
Between the early 1920s and the outbreak of World War II, the BBC developed two nationwide radio stations – the National Programme and the Regional Programme (which began broadcasting on 9 March 1930) – as well as a basic service from London that included programming originated in six regions. Although the programme items attracting the greatest number of listeners tended to appear on the National, they were each designed to appeal "across the board" to a single but variegated audience by offering at most times of the day a choice of programme type rather than simply catering to two distinct audiences.

=== 1939–1940: Start of World War II ===
On 1 September 1939, the BBC merged the two programmes into one national service from London. The reasons given included the need to prevent enemy aircraft from using differentiated output from the Regional Programme's transmitters as navigational beacons. To this end, the former regional transmitters were synchronised in chains on (initially) two frequencies, 668 (South) and 767 kHz (North), with an additional chain of low-powered transmitters (known as "Group H") on 1474 kHz appearing later. Under this arrangement, regional broadcasting in its pre-war form was no longer feasible, but much of the programming was gradually decentralised to the former regional studios because of the risks from enemy attack or bombing in London to broadcasting nationally.

This new station was named the Home Service, which was also the internal designation at the BBC for domestic radio broadcasting (the organisation had also both the Television and Overseas Service departments). During the war, BBC Home Service would air each day from 7.00 am until 12.15 am, with main news bulletins airing at 7.00 am, 8.00 am, 1.00 pm, 6.00 pm, 9.00 pm and midnight.

The Home Service continued in this form until the end of World War II.

=== 1945–1967: Post-war era ===
On 29 July 1945, the BBC resumed its previous regional structure. Following the wartime success of the BBC Forces Programme and BBC General Forces Programme, light entertainment was transferred to the new BBC Light Programme, whilst "serious" programming – news, drama and discussion – remained on the regionalised Home Service. Popular light programming such as It's That Man Again remained on the Home Service, and some speech programming of the type pioneered by the Forces Programme – the newly launched Woman's Hour being very much in this mould – was on the Light Programme.

Following the end of the war, the Home Service adjusted its broadcasting hours, now commencing at 6.25 am each weekday and 7.50 am on Sundays, and ending at around 11.10 pm each night. By 1964, the Home Service was on the air each day from 6.35 am (7.50 am on Sundays) and would conclude each night at the precise time of 11.48 pm.

On 30 September 1967, the BBC split the Light Programme into separate pop music and entertainment stations, becoming BBC Radio 1 and BBC Radio 2 respectively. The Third Programme became BBC Radio 3, with the Music Programme losing its separate identities (the Third, Study Session and Sports Service were retained under the banner of Network Three until 4 April 1970), and the Home Service was replaced by BBC Radio 4.

== Programming ==
The service provided between five and seven national news bulletins a day from London – with drama, talks and informational programmes. Non-topical talk programmes and heavier drama output were transferred to the Third Programme when it began broadcasting on 29 September 1946.

=== Music and schools ===
During the day, the service also included programmes of classical music. These were reduced in number when government limits on radio broadcasting hours were relaxed in 1964, and the Music Programme began broadcasting during the daytime on the frequencies of the (evening-only) Third Programme. They were discontinued when regular broadcasting began daily from 7.00 am to 6.30 pm on 22 March 1965.

The service also broadcast educational programmes for schools during the day, backed with booklets and support material.

=== Reorganisation ===
Programmes were reorganised across the three BBC networks on 30 September 1957, with much of the Home Service's lighter content transferring to the BBC Light Programme and the establishment of the Third Network, which used the frequencies of the Third Programme to carry the Home Service's adult education content known as the Study Session, and the Home and Light's sports coverage as well as the Third Programme itself.

== Regional services ==
The BBC Home Service had seven different regions, while London and South East England was served by the "basic" service, which was not considered a region by the BBC and acted as the sustaining service for the other regions:

Region	Home city	Wavelength (m)	Frequency (kHz)
Booster signal wavelengths and frequencies in parentheses
n/a	London	330 (202)	908 (1484)
Midland	Birmingham	276	1088
North	Manchester	434 (261, 202)	692 (1151, 1484)
West	Bristol	285; 206	1052; 1457
Welsh	Cardiff	341	881
Scottish	Glasgow	371	809
Northern Ireland	Belfast	Until 1963: 261	1151
Northern Ireland	Belfast	From 1963: 224	1340

A shortage of frequencies meant that the Northern Ireland Home Service was treated as part of the North Home Service, as well as the Northern Ireland service used the same frequency as a North service booster. The Northern Ireland service was separated from the North region on 7 January 1963.

Initially, BBC Radio 4 continued to provide more regional programming and scheduling, and the BBC's weekly programme journal magazine Radio Times listed the channel's offerings under the heading "Radio 4 – Home Service" with particular reference to the seven broadcasting regions individually.

=== Legacy ===
With the introduction of BBC Local Radio, starting with BBC Radio Leicester on 8 November 1967, it was felt that the future of non-national broadcasting lay in local rather than regional services. The BBC produced a report called Broadcasting in the Seventies on 10 July 1969, proposing the reorganisation of programmes on the national networks and the end of regional broadcasting.

The report began to be implemented on 4 April 1970 and the Home Service regions gradually disappeared, with some of their frequencies reallocated to Independent Local Radio, until 23 November 1978 when Radio 4 was given the national longwave frequency previously used by Radio 2 and was relaunched as the "Radio 4 UK" service (remained until 29 September 1984), with two additional transmitters opened in Scotland.

==== English news bulletins ====
Radio 4 FM continued to carry four daily five-minute regional news bulletins on Mondays to Saturdays until mid-1980, by which time BBC Local Radio had reached most areas of England. The wide coverage of the Holme Moss transmitter meant that listeners in much of Northern England received combined North and North West news bulletins.

==== National and other regions ====
The "national regions" became BBC Radio Scotland, BBC Radio Wales / BBC Radio Cymru and BBC Radio Ulster, at first relaying the majority of Radio 4 programming but later becoming completely independent.

During the 1970s, Radio 4 FM in the East of England (Tacolneston, Peterborough and other relays) carried a breakfast magazine programme called Roundabout East Anglia was first broadcast on 5 August 1974 as the region lacked any BBC Local Radio until the service ceased on 30 May 1980, ahead of the opening of BBC Radio Norfolk four months later. The last former Home Service region for the South West England was an VHF/FM opt-out of Radio 4, Morning Sou'West was also carried on several low-power medium wave transmitters before the programme ended on 31 December 1982, to paving the way for two new local stations (BBC Radio Devon and BBC Radio Cornwall) launched on 17 January 1983.

== Sources ==
=== References ===
- BBC Year Book 1947 (various authors), London: British Broadcasting Corporation, 1947.
- BBC Year Book 1948 (various authors), London: British Broadcasting Corporation, 1948.
- BBC Handbook 1967 (various authors), London: British Broadcasting Corporation, 1967.
- BBC Handbook 1972 (various authors), London: British Broadcasting Corporation, 1972.
- BBC Annual Report and Handbook 1987 (various authors), London: British Broadcasting Corporation, 1986 [sic]. ISBN 0-563-20542-3.
- Paulu, Burton: British Broadcasting: Radio and Television in the United Kingdom, Minneapolis: University of Minnesota Press, 1956.
