= Westerglen transmitting station =

Transmitter station in Falkirk, Scotland

Westerglen
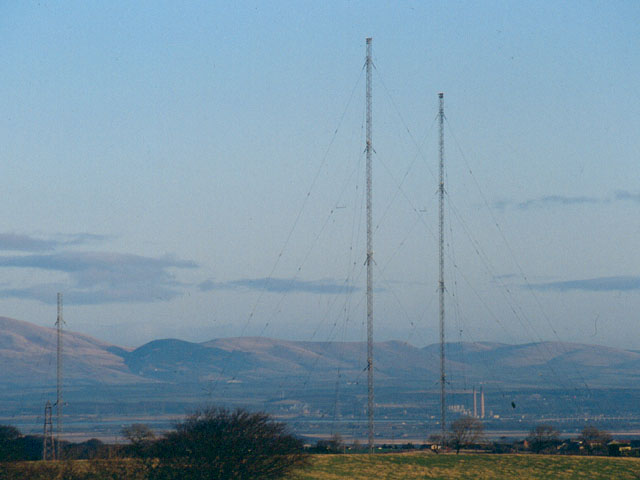
- The four masts at the Westerglen transmitting station
- Location: 2 miles (3 km) south west of Falkirk, Stirlingshire, Scotland
- Coordinates: 55°58′30″N 3°49′6″W
- Grid reference: NS868773
- Built: May 1932

The Westerglen transmitting station is a facility for mediumwave (and formerly also longwave) broadcasting established in 1932 at Westerglen Farm, 2 miles (3 km) southwest of Falkirk, Stirlingshire, Scotland (grid reference NS868773).

== Transmission ==
=== Medium wave ===
Three medium-wave radio programmes are broadcast from the site on frequencies of 810, 909, and 1089 kHz. The transmitter also carried Absolute Radio on 1215 kHz until Bauer ended all station transmissions on MW in January 2023.

The medium-wave broadcast is strong enough to be heard as far south as Cornwall at certain times of the day, and in south-western Germany at night with good conditions.

=== Long wave ===
Westerglen was formerly used for long wave transmissions, latterly broadcasting BBC Radio 4 on 198 kHz. It was broadcast in a single-frequency network with the Droitwich and Burghead transmitting stations.

Radio 4 transmissions ended on 27 June 2026 at 01:00 BST, switching over to a looped recording of retuning advice scheduled to switch off three days later.

It was fully shut down just after 12:00 BST on 30 June.

== Structure ==
There are three guyed steel lattices mast radiators on the site, which are insulated against the ground. These carry combinations of the above services. There is a shorter fourth mast that carries non-broadcast services.

One of the masts carried the long-wave transmission in a synchronised group with the transmitters at Droitwich and Burghead on the same frequency (198 kHz; previously, until February 1988, 200kHz). This mast is of guyed steel lattice construction with a triangular cross-section, and it carries a 'capacity hat', which increases the antenna's efficiency, at the top.

The site is owned and operated by Arqiva.

== History ==
The new structure was announced in December 1930. It would replace transmitters in Glasgow, Edinburgh and Dundee. It would be the BBC's third twin transmitter. There would be 70kW on each wavelength. Construction was complete by December 1931. Test transmissions began in April 1932, the National on 288.5 metres (1040 kHz), and Regional on 376.4 metres (797 kHz). Tests on the Regional service began on Monday, 2 May 1932.

The site officially opened on 20 May 1932. The Regional service broadcast from Sunday, 12 June 1932. The National programme began on Sunday 25, September 1932.

=== Incidents ===
A Scottish nationalist group caused an explosion in early January 1973, led by 34 year old Donald Currie, of Menstrie. The group was known as the 'Army of the Provisional Government', led by Frederick Boothby, a former British Army officer. The investigation was by Detective Superintendent David Pitoaithly, the head of Stirling and Clackmannan CID. Another explosion was at an electricity pylon near Wamphray in Dumfries, near the A74, on December 10 1972.

== Services available ==
Frequency	kW	Service
810 kHz	100	BBC Radio Scotland
909 kHz	50	BBC Radio 5 Live
1089 kHz	50	Talksport

=== Former services ===
Frequency	kW	Service	Switch-off date
198 kHz	50	BBC Radio 4	27 June 2026
1215 kHz	50	Absolute Radio	20 January 2023

== See also ==
- List of masts
- List of radio stations in the United Kingdom
