= Droitwich Transmitting Station =

Longwave and mediumwave radio transmitter in England

Droitwich
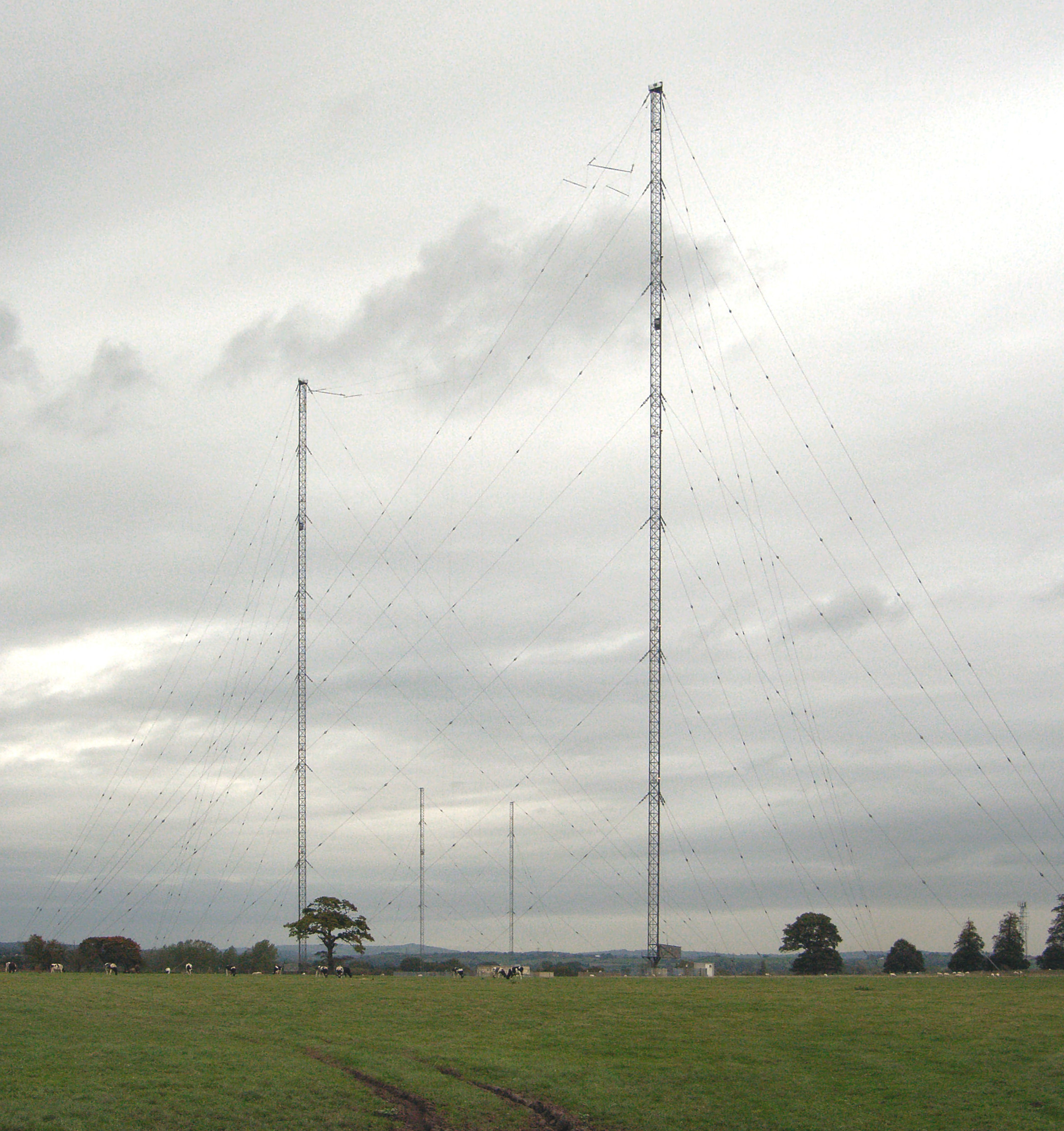
- Masts at the Droitwich transmitting station

- Location within Worcestershire
- Location: Droitwich, Worcestershire
- Mast height: 213.36 metres (700 ft)
- Coordinates: 52°17′48″N 2°06′19″W
- Grid reference: SO929663
- Built: 1934

The Droitwich transmitting station is a large broadcasting facility for medium-wave, and also formerly long-wave radio transmissions, established in 1934 in the civil parish of Dodderhill, just outside the village of Wychbold, near Droitwich in Worcestershire, England (grid reference SO929663).

Until its shutdown in 2026, the site was also the location of the British Broadcasting Corporation's most powerful long-wave transmitter, which together with the two Scottish long-wave transmitters at Burghead and Westerglen formed a network broadcasting on the same frequency. From 1978 until their closure, these broadcast BBC Radio 4 on long wave (latterly on 198 kHz).

Following the ending of long wave Radio 4 transmissions on 27 June 2026 and its replacement with a placeholder message, (Note: A short, spoken/pre-recorded sound track reminding the remaining listeners from 198 kHz long wave to move to alternate forms of listening, such as FM (92-95 and 103-105 MHz), DAB digital radio, the BBC Sounds service, or asking smart speaker to play BBC Radio 4.) the long wave transmitter was finally shut down permanently at 12:03:32 BST on 30 June 2026. This marked the end of long wave radio transmission in the United Kingdom after almost 92 years.

The masts can be seen to the east from the M5 motorway, between Droitwich and Bromsgrove, as well as to the west from the Herefordshire/Worcestershire border. At night, the two sets of aircraft warning lights are visible from a long distance. The station is owned and operated by Arqiva.

== History ==
Long wave broadcasting in the early 1920s was largely thought to be of zero intrinsic worth, and not worth considering for broadcasting. But in December 1921, long wave broadcasts from the US were picked up in Britain, and people realised that long wave broadcasts travelled far.

In February 1932, radio broadcasting strength tests took place at Wychbold and Whittington, Worcestershire.

By March 1932, it had been decided to put the 5XX LW transmitter at Droitwich, at 120 kW, and to boost the Midland Regional programme to 70 kW there. The Wychbold site was chosen in December 1932. The site was bought in March 1933, three miles north east of Droitwich.

=== Construction ===
The foundations were built by May 1933. In November 1933 the expected power was increased to 150 kW, as that was the maximum allowed under the Lucerne Plan, which took effect on 15 January 1934.

During construction, from June 12-20 1934, the International Broadcasting Union held its annual meeting in London, being met by BBC chairman John Henry Whitley, and the international group visited Droitwich.

Tests ran from Monday 30 July 1934 at 12:05 am until 3 am, to 31 August, except on Sundays. The station was expected to partly open on Thursday 6 September 1934, on 1,500 metres LW. It would open at 3:45 pm until 4:15 pm, then from 10:40 pm. The first morning broadcast of the National programme would be the following day from 10:15 am until 11:55 am.

The two masts were 180 tons each, 700 ft (210 m) apart. Power came from four 750 hp, 375 rpm English Electric (in Rugby) 'L type' diesel engines, each connected to a 470 kW, 415 V three phase alternator, producing enough power to supply 5,000 homes; exhaust from the engines powered the building's central heating.

When Droitwich opened the 5XX National Programme would move onto the 150kW long wave transmitter, moving from the 50kW MW transmitter at Daventry. Series modulation would replace parallel modulation.

=== First broadcasts ===
The first item was the 1923 The Merrymakers overture, by Eric Coates, played by the BBC Symphony Orchestra, conducted by Aylmer Buesst.

The full opening was on Sunday 7 October 1934. It was hoped a member of the Royal family would open the building, but none was available.

== Technical specifications ==
The long wave frequency used was 200 kilohertz (frequently referred to by the wavelength, 1,500 metres) until 1 February 1988, when it was changed to 198 kilohertz. The carrier frequency was controlled by a rubidium atomic frequency standard in the transmitter building, enabling the transmission to be used as an off-air frequency standard. For long wave transmissions, a T-aerial was used, which was suspended between two 213-metre-high (700 ft) guyed steel lattice radio masts, which stood 180 metres (590 ft) apart from each other. The long wave station uses two Marconi B6042 transmitters, each rated at 250 kW for a total of 500 kW. Two power output valves are used in each unit and are vapatron types that boil water in the ceramic cooling jackets. The units use a form of pulse width modulation to give an overall electrical efficiency approaching 70%.

There are also two guyed medium wave mast radiators at the site. The northerly mast is actually the transmitting antenna whilst the southern mast is a passive reflector, causing the RF signal to form a cardioid pattern tending in a north-easterly direction so as not to interfere with the similar set up in Bristol. The smaller mast system transmits digital radio signals. The main large system is used for transmitting AM medium wave radio programmes on 693 kHz and 1053 kHz and, until 2023, on 1215 kHz.

== Transmissions ==
BBC Radio 5 Live is broadcast on 693 kHz medium wave (MW), providing coverage for most of the English Midlands and Wales at a signal strength (150 kW) which is one of the strongest for that station, equal to Brookmans Park and second only to Moorside Edge.

BBC Radio 4 was transmitted on 198 kHz long wave. This signal also carried radio data encoded using phase modulation, which gave a time-of-day signal, and radio teleswitch control signals for certain electricity meters, including Economy 7 and other time-controlled tariffs. The planned end to the usage of this frequency for the Radio Teleswitch Service on 30 June 2025 was subsequently postponed but ultimately took place on 30 June 2026 alongside the switching off of Radio 4’s LW frequency.

The BBC Third Programme began from Droitwich, but there was interference for half of Britain. To overcome this interference from a Riga transmitter, VHF was looked at as a possibility, or other local transmitters on 203 metres.

The Third Programme, under the new 1950 broadcasting plan, was moved to a short-term 60kW transmitter at Daventry, where from Sunday April 8 1951, it had a 150kW transmitter on 647kHz, from the former 5XX building at Daventry, from a new 725ft mast, the highest mast that the BBC had built.

In January 1984 at 8.30am the mast was damaged by high winds. A cooling tower at Fiddler's Ferry power station collapsed on the same day.

During World War II coded messages, which were read during normal programmed broadcasts, were sent to the French Resistance using the transmitter.

=== Discontinuation of long wave transmissions ===
In 2011, as a result of budget cuts, the BBC announced that there would be no re-investment in long wave transmissions, which may mean an eventual end to BBC Radio 4 Longwave broadcasts. The same year, The Guardian reported that the transmitter relies upon a pair of glass valves, of which there are fewer than 10 left in the world, and the BBC did not believe it was safe enough to manufacture more, because "slightly faulty" replacements could cause catastrophic failure.

In 2023, the BBC announced that it would end separate programming for BBC Radio 4 on longwave in March 2024, with an intent to switch off its long wave transmitters on, or shortly after, this date. The separate long wave programming ended on 15 April 2024.

On 15 April 2026, the BBC confirmed that Radio 4’s Long Wave service would be closing "later [that] year" with approximately two months notice to be given of the actual switch-off date. The BBC broadcast daily on-air reminders to help long wave listeners switch to other ways of listening.

On 11 May 2026, the BBC confirmed that they would shut down the Radio 4 long wave service on 27 June 2026, along with broadcasting daily on-air reminders about the switch-off. At the same time, the BBC confirmed that they would shut down the station at 01:00 BST (00:00 GMT), instead of switching to a simulcast of the World Service. The daily reminders, however, did not mention this.

At 01:00 BST, the long wave transmitter was switched into a looped recording of retuning advice as planned, and fell silent on 30 June 2026 at 12:03:32 BST (11:03:32 GMT), when the remaining long wave signal was permanently shut down.

== Reception ==
BBC Radio 4 reception near Vitebsk, Belarus on the night of June 21, 2026 (about 2,100 km)

The Radio 4 LW signal from Droitwich covered most of England and Wales. There were supplementary long-wave transmitters in Scotland (Burghead and Westerglen, both 50 kW). The station could also be heard clearly in most of the Republic of Ireland, particularly along eastern and southern counties. Reception was also possible in Western Europe, including Italy and Sweden.

== Services available ==
Frequency	Power (kW)	Service
693 kHz	50	BBC Radio 5 Live
1053 kHz	500 (night) 125 (day)	Talksport

Formerly:

Frequency	Power (kW)	Service	Closed
198 kHz	500	BBC Radio 4	27 June 2026
1215 kHz	200	Absolute Radio	20 January 2023

== See also ==
- List of masts
- List of radio stations in the United Kingdom
- List of tallest structures in the United Kingdom
- Radio teleswitch
