= Burton Paulu =

Burton Paulu (June 25, 1910 – March 8, 2003) was a pioneer in American educational radio and television, an internationally recognized scholar of comparative broadcasting, and a lifelong lover of classical music.

Based for five decades at the University of Minnesota in Minneapolis, Paulu was the author of five books and dozens of articles on radio and television in Great Britain and on the continent of Europe. His work introduced American scholars and the interested public to broadcasting systems in Eastern and Western European countries where the role of the government and of advertising contrasted sharply with US practices. He taught and lectured widely in the US and Europe and held three appointments in the journalism department of Moscow State University, the first at a time when academic contacts between the US and the then - Soviet Union were rare and the last, when he was 81 years old, as the Soviet Union was collapsing.

Paulu became manager of University of Minnesota radio station KUOM in 1928, in the early years of broadcasting, and participated in the development of public radio and television in the US, presiding as the University of Minnesota expanded its broadcasting activities to include short-lived innovations such as the use of closed circuit television to teach college courses and permanent changes to the American broadcasting landscape such as the introduction of educational television to the general public. He taught classes on American and international broadcasting until he retired with the title of professor and director of the university's Media Resources Department in 1978.

Born in Pewaukee, Wisconsin, and raised in small towns in South Dakota, Paulu developed an early interest in classical music as a result of hearing the Minneapolis Symphony Orchestra perform when he was a boy. His broadcasting career began in 1929, when he was working toward a degree in music at the University of Minnesota and took a part-time job as a student announcer at the university's young radio station WLB (later KUOM). He earned a BA (1931) and BS (1932) in music along with an MA degree in history from the University of Minnesota. While stationed in London and Luxembourg with the United States Office of War Information during World War II he developed an interest in European broadcasting, and in 1949 was awarded a PhD in communications from New York University.

He was a frequent substitute trombonist for the Minnesota (formerly Minneapolis) Orchestra from the 1940s to the 1960s and contributed significantly to the Orchestra's oral history project through a series of taped interviews with performing artists.

Among Paulu's numerous awards were five Fulbright Scholarships, three Ford Foundation grants, and a Sigma Delta Chi Award for journalism research. He served as president of the National Association of Educational Broadcasters and was a member of US delegations to UNESCO.

Paulu was married for 60 years to the former Frances Tuttle Brown and was the father of three; he died at age 92 of Parkinson's.
