= A Passion for Churches =

1974 BBC television documentary by Edward Mirzoeff

- Titlescreen in mock-Medieval decorated script
- Genre: Documentary
- Written by: John Betjeman
- Directed by: Edward Mirzoeff
- Presented by: John Betjeman
- Country of origin: United Kingdom
- Original language: English

Production
- Producer: Edward Mirzoeff
- Cinematography: John McGlashan
- Editor: Edward Roberts
- Running time: 50 minutes
- Production company: BBC General Features

Original release
- Network: BBC2
- Release: 7 December 1974

Related
- Metro-land

A Passion for Churches is a 1974 BBC television documentary written and presented by the then Poet Laureate Sir John Betjeman and produced and directed by Edward Mirzoeff. Commissioned as a follow-up to the critically acclaimed 1973 documentary Metro-land, the film offers Betjeman's personal poetic record of the various rituals taking place throughout the Anglican Diocese of Norwich and its churches in the run-up to Easter Sunday using the framing device of the Holy sacraments.

Created with the approval of the Bishop of Norwich, Maurice Wood, the 49-minute film was shot on location in Norfolk and parts of Suffolk throughout the spring of 1974 on 16 mm colour film by cameraman John McGlashan. For the film, John Betjeman wrote an original poetic commentary consisting of blank verse, free verse, and prose and he appeared on-screen in several segments to describe features of ecclesiastical buildings and to reminisce about his lifelong "passion for churches".

The programme was praised by critics upon its original BBC 2 screening in December 1974 and gained high audience appreciation figures. It has since been repeated on BBC Four in 2006. It was released on a limited-edition DVD in 2007.

== Production ==
=== Background ===
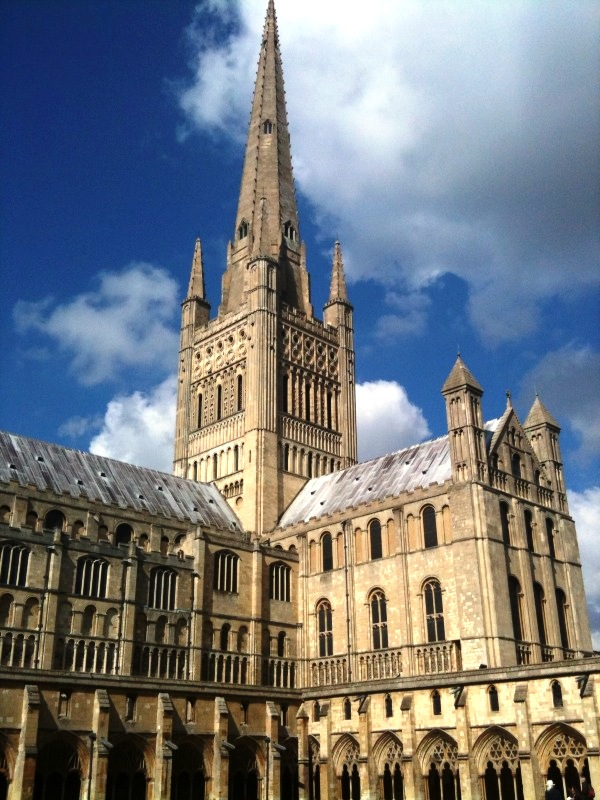
The film examines churches in the Diocese of Norwich.

Following the success of the 1973 film Metro-land, which documented life in suburban London, Edward Mirzoeff was commissioned to create a new documentary with John Betjeman. Mirzoeff noticed that aside from suburban themes, the Church of England was the other major influence on Betjeman's poetry. His proposal to the poet was for a study of the Church of England to be titled Failed in Divinity, a line derived from Betjeman's poetic autobiography Summoned by Bells, in which the poet relates how he was sent down from the University of Oxford after failing a compulsory examination on divinity. In Mirzoeff's first treatment, Betjeman would have embarked on a journey around Britain studying fine cathedrals, churches and their congregations. Betjeman ruled against the title, but liked the idea, although he was keen that the film should be primarily about the Church and its people, and not himself.

Following this early proposal, Mirzoeff and Betjeman realised that a study of the whole Church would be too ambitious, and instead decided to set the film within one diocese. Betjeman initially suggested the Diocese of Southwark, owing to a friendship with the then-Bishop of Southwark, Mervyn Stockwood. Mirzoeff was not keen, given that Southwark was primarily an urban diocese. A disastrous meeting with the bishop (who was "high-handed, arrogant and very, very rude") led to that idea being scrapped.

Film editor Ted Roberts suggested the Diocese of Norwich, as Norfolk is noted for the density of its medieval churches in a variety of urban, coastal and rural locations. In addition, Betjeman was close friends with Lady Wilhelmina "Billa" Harrod (to whom he had once been engaged), who resided at The Old Rectory, Holt. She was greatly involved with saving redundant churches and was personal friends with the Bishop of Norwich, Maurice Wood, and was also able to provide the crew with accommodation. Early location-scouting proved fruitful, and the production was bolstered by a meeting with Bishop Wood in March 1974, during which the bishop, after initial reluctance, gave the production his blessing. Filming began in April 1974.

=== Filming ===
"I was eight or nine years old when I used to come here to the Norfolk Broads on the River Bure, sailing and rowing with my father. And I think it was the outline of that church tower of Belaugh against the sky that gave me a passion for churches so that every church I've passed since I've wanted to stop and look in."

— Sir John Betjeman (opening lines of the film)

The documentary was shot on 16 mm colour film by cameraman John McGlashan, who had also worked on the BBC's M.R. James series of adaptations A Ghost Story for Christmas, of which the early installments were entirely filmed in Norfolk (Betjeman was a fan of Jamesian ghost stories, and often read them to the crew while travelling to locations). McGlashan was also a part-time priest for a Liberal Catholic church, and was able to bring to the production additional knowledge of the Sacraments.

After deciding against the original "Failed in Divinity" preface, it was decided to open the film with Betjeman remembering a Norfolk rowing holiday from his youth in which his father pointed out the tower of St Peter's church in Belaugh. This moment, he said, led to his lifelong "passion for churches", a phrase that would eventually form the title of the film. The crew decided to film Betjeman revisiting this location on the River Bure, although on several occasions the poet nearly capsized his rowing boat.

The production work was exhaustive, involving the filming of numerous churches in Norfolk, both ancient and more modern. Many of the clergymen featured in the programme were discovered by accident or by word-of-mouth. For example, the production researcher managed to find, on request, a vicar who had an extensive model railway in his rectory, another whose ministry was based on water (the Chaplain of the Broads) and a vicar whose congregation at the time numbered zero.

Several of the services featured in the film were one-off events. For example, the wedding was shot at Lyng, where the bride's father was the rector. The bridegroom, Nigel McCulloch, went on to become the Bishop of Manchester. The production encountered difficulties with obtaining some footage; while filming a Seaman's Mission from Great Yarmouth, a wave flooded the boat, ruining the sound-recording equipment, and a sequence featuring an open-air service taking place at daybreak on Easter Sunday at the most easterly point of the UK – at Ness Point, Lowestoft – was nearly missed after the sound recordist overslept.

=== Poetry ===
The commentary alternates between blank verse, free verse, and prose. Although Betjeman had accompanied the production on most of its shoots, his poetic commentary was only written in the weeks after the film had already been edited by Roberts. According to Mirzoeff, he would run sequences from the film for hours, searching for inspiration in the rhythm of the editing, sometimes sitting in a small cupboard to help himself concentrate. Betjeman's daughter, Candida Lycett Green recalls that "JB put everything into it that he could muster: the film was about all that he loved about England - its people, its church and its architecture. Throughout his life he had been able to find poetry where others had never thought to look."

Mirzoeff notes that he found writing the text for A Passion for Churches more of a strain than for his previous film since he had to take into consideration both his own beliefs and those of his friends. Sometimes members of the crew would help him by writing their own verses for him to use or modify. One particular sequence proved so difficult to write that Betjeman flew into a rage after the director pressured him to hurry the composition along. Mirzoeff suggests that several sequences, such as the scene about redundancy and death, provoked verse of much greater "complexity and depth" than any heard in his previous screen appearances.

== Synopsis ==
What would you be, you wide East Anglian sky,
Without church towers to recognise you by?

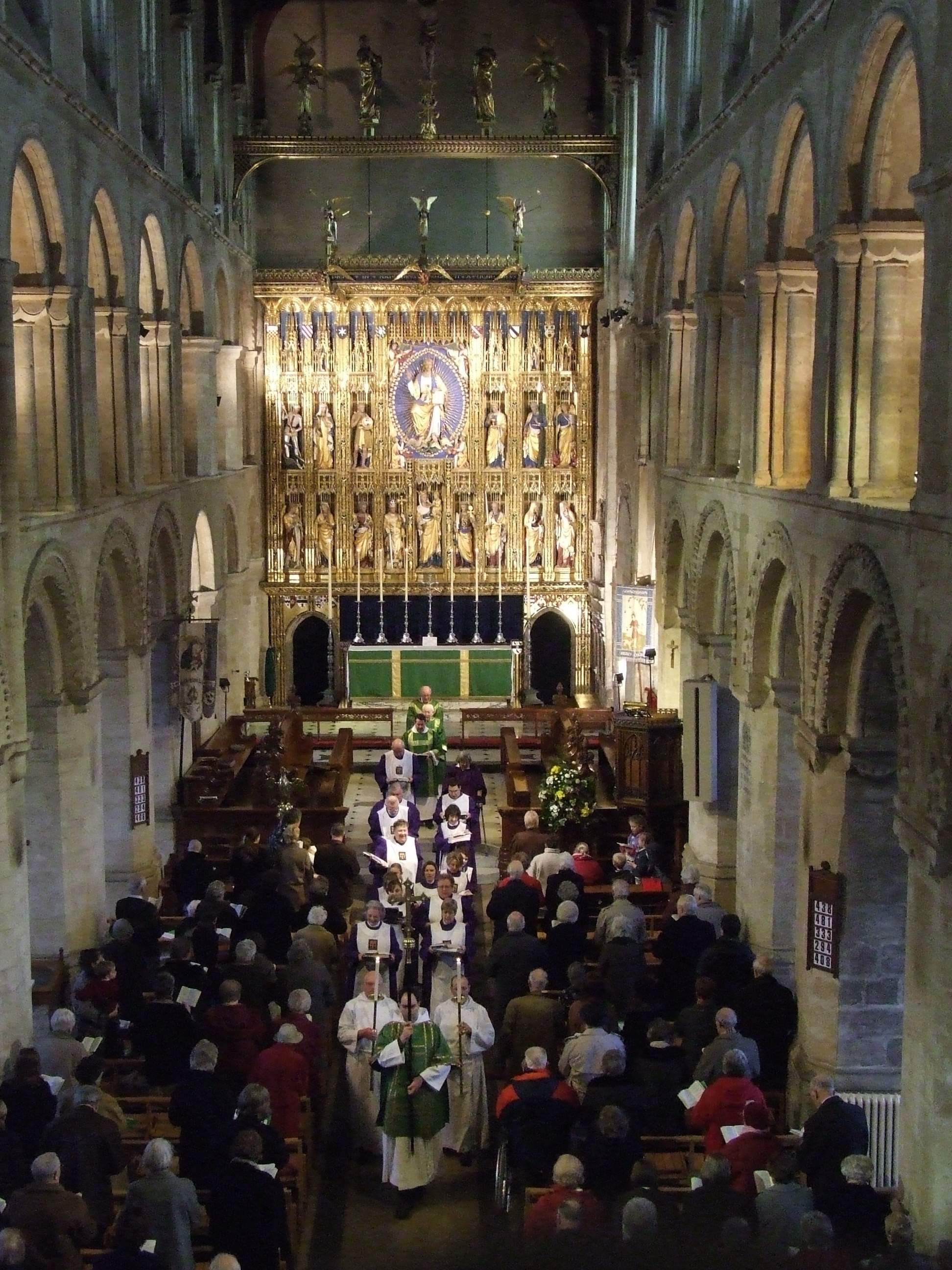
The nave at Wymondham Abbey, featuring Ninian Comper's Victorian reredos, is admired by the poet in the film.

The film is roughly based on themes suggested by the Anglican sacraments. It opens with Betjeman's recollection of how a boating holiday by Belaugh in Norfolk inspired his "Passion for Churches". After a montage of church architecture with the musical accompaniment of the barrel organ of Bressingham, the focus shifts to St Margaret's, Cley next the Sea, where Betjeman introduces the viewer to its features. The scene then switches to a baptism in Trunch and later a children's service in Mattishall. Also seen are the restoration of the medieval screen at Ranworth and examples of surviving Norwich glass at East Harling. Betjeman then journeys to Norwich, which has more surviving medieval churches than London, Bristol and York combined. At Norwich Cathedral, the centre of the diocese, he attends a Mothers' Union meeting with the Bishop, and later the institution of a new rector to the living of Holt. Betjeman tells the viewer about the Elizabethan vicarage of Great Snoring. Later seen are a vicar busily writing his newsletter at Weston Longville, a parish meeting at Letheringsett and a fête at South Raynham. Betjeman presents the three-storey pulpit of St Mary's Bylaugh and the brass-rubbing at Felbrigg. A wedding takes place in Lyng and in the tower of Wiveton, change ringers explain their addiction to bell-ringing.

Betjeman explores the ruins of St Benet's Abbey before seeing its modern equivalent at a convent of Anglican nuns at the Community of All Hallows, Ditchingham. Betjeman then takes the North Norfolk Railway to Walsingham to see the Anglican pilgrims going to the church of Our Lady of Walsingham. After a look at the Queen's church in Sandringham and the unusual Victorian church at Booton, choir practices are seen in progress at Martham and Wymondham Abbey. Exulting the work of Sir Ninian Comper at Lound, Suffolk, Betjeman recalls that he looked like Colonel Sanders. As Easter Day approaches, Betjeman reflects on the furthest reaches of the diocese - a parish church in Flordon that no one attends, as well as the fate of those churches declared redundant; conversion into hospitals, an artists' studio, a shoe store and dereliction (St Peter, Corpusty). We see the water-borne ministries of the Chaplain of the Missions to Seamen, Great Yarmouth, visiting the crew of Smith's Knoll Lightship, and the Chaplain of the Broads invites holidaymakers to Easter service at Ranworth. Easter Day breaks at Ness Point Lowestoft with a service to greet the rising sun. Ladies from the Almshouses in Castle Rising process to church in their Jacobean uniform. The film concludes back in Norwich as parishioners of St Peter Mancroft, and parishioners from churches all around the county summoned by bells, walk to worship.

== Reception and release ==
Mirzoeff recalls that A Passion for Churches created a minor internal disagreement at the BBC since the film, produced by the General Features Department, discussed a subject considered to be the territory of the Religious Broadcasting Department. The head of the department insisted on a screening, but was placated by the presence of the poet and Prime Minister Harold Wilson's wife, Mary, at a private showing held in November 1974, and he gave the film his approval.

Critical reception to the film was generally very positive: The Times Literary Supplement named it "Sir John's masterpiece to date" and the Financial Times described it as "extremely good". Television playwright Dennis Potter was also highly complimentary, writing his New Statesman review in verse as a tribute. Only the Eastern Daily Press felt that the film was too short and lacking in detail. But it responded favourably to the repeat, claiming that its original criticisms had led to the film being much improved. In fact not one single frame had been changed. Audience response was recorded as "exceptionally enthusiastic" and Betjeman himself was pleased with the result, although of his films he still favoured Metro-land.

A Passion for Churches was revived by BBC Four in 2006 to mark the centenary of the poet's birth. It was subsequently released on a limited-edition DVD in 2007 with notes by the producer and two additional short films by the poet.
