= Great Snoring =

Village in Norfolk, England

Coordinates: 52.8736°N 0.8914°E

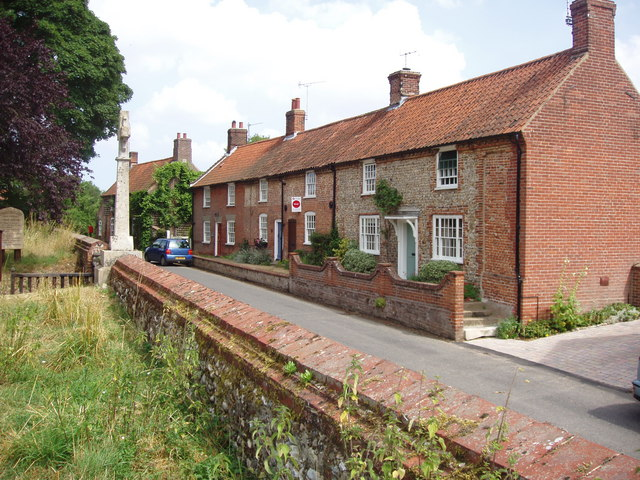
- Great Snoring houses and war memorial

- Location within Norfolk
- Area: 6.85 km^{2} (2.64 sq mi)
- Population: 143 (2011)
  - Density: 21/km^{2} (54/sq mi)
- OS grid reference: TF946345
  - London: 105 mi (169 km) SSW
- Civil parish: Great Snoring
- District: North Norfolk
- Shire county: Norfolk
- Region: East
- Country: England
- Sovereign state: United Kingdom
- Post town: FAKENHAM
- Postcode district: NR21
- Police: Norfolk
- Fire: Norfolk
- Ambulance: East of England

Great Snoring is a rural village in North Norfolk by the River Stiffkey, in the east of England. It is situated approximately 25 miles (40 km) north-west from the city and county town of Norwich, and 2 miles (3 km) north from the larger village of Little Snoring.

At the centre of the village are the listed buildings of St Mary's Church and the Old Rectory. The village's main road, called The Street comprises houses of brick and flint. The nearest inn and shop is in Little Snoring.

Village population in the 2001 Census was 168, reduced to 143 at the 2011 Census.

== History ==
The 1086 Domesday Book calls the village by the Saxon name Snaringa/Snarringes, named after an inhabitant called Snear. The book includes mention of a water mill, which now features on the village sign.

Historically the name Snoring Magna was used, "magna" being Latin for "greater".

In 1611 Sir Ralph Shelton, lord of the manor, sold Great Snoring to Lord Chief Justice Richardson. Sir Ralph is reported to have said "I can sleep without Snoring".

John Pearson (1612–86), the English divine and scholar, was born in Great Snoring on 28 February 1612.

Francis White's 1854 History, Gazetteer and Directory of Norfolk describes the village as having as 99 houses, with a total population of 656, and with John Dugmore, Esq as lord of the manor. The church, dedicated to the Virgin Mary, is described as having a "fine tower" (formerly a spire), containing curious old brasses of the Shelton family. White notes the rectory house, built by the Shelton family, as a "fine specimen of ornamental brick work", valued at £24 and occupied by the Revd D. H. Lee Warner. The Walsingham Union House, a workhouse, contained 164 staff and occupants.

=== Walsingham Union workhouse ===
On 12 April 1836 the Walsingham Poor Law Union was formed, and a new Walsingham Union workhouse was built at Great Snoring in the same year to accommodate up to 250 inmates. The architect was William Thorold, and he based it on Sampson Kempthorne's model cruciform plan published by the Poor Law Commissioners in 1835. Four accommodation wings were joined to a central supervisory area, allowing segregation of different categories of inmate. Areas between the wings were used as exercise space. Workshops and service buildings around the edge gave the overall site an octagonal shape. To the east of the site a chapel was built.

After the closure of the workhouse, the buildings had various uses: as a smallpox hospital in the 1930s; by the Civil Defence in the 1950s; and most recently, plans to convert the building into 35 flats were approved in 1961. But no conversion was carried out and the buildings have now been demolished.

In 2014 The Workhouse, now more correctly known as Thursford Castle (sic), was sold to a property developer who has again offered it for sale complete with Planning Consent for a domestic residence.

== Landmarks ==
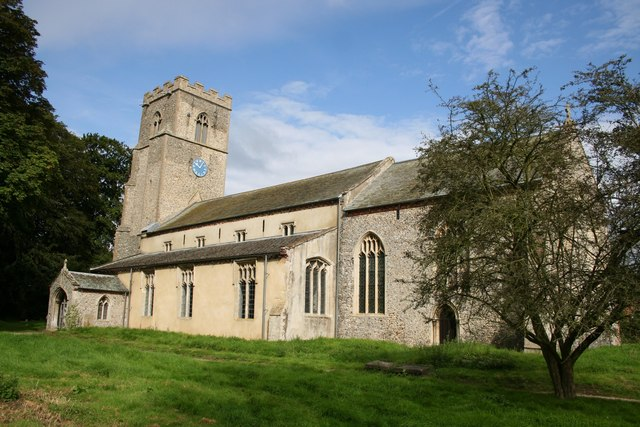
Church of St Mary the Virgin

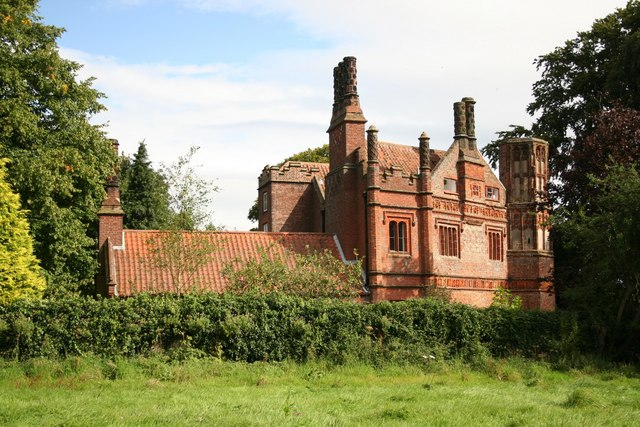
The Old Rectory, previously a manor house

Great Snoring Church of England parish church is dedicated to Saint Mary the Virgin. Its exterior is of chiefly Perpendicular style although with earlier elements, with interior fixtures and detailing from the 12th to the 18th centuries. The church was Grade I listed in 1959.

Adjacent to the churchyard is the two-storey brick and terracotta Old Rectory. Built in the late 15th or early 16th century as a manor house for the Shelton family, it was extended between the 17th and 19th centuries. The house was Grade II* listed in 1951. John Betjeman in his 1974 documentary for the BBC, A Passion for Churches, describes the house: "the rectory house is a Tudor palace, with moulded autumn-colour brick and elaborate chimney stacks".

Great Snoring war memorial lists 22 men who died in the First World War.

== Population ==
Population of Great Snoring
Year	1841	1854	1861	1871	1891	1911	1921	2001	2011
Population	556	656	594	598	543	484	413	168	143

The 2001 Census shows 168 people in 81 households (35 owner-occupied, 46 rented). 24 of these households were classified as "second residence / holiday accommodation". Population has decreased since 1841 when it was 556 (this included 81 people in the Walsingham Union Workhouse).
