= Bird's Eye View (TV series) =

British TV series (1969–1971)

- Theme music composer: Johnny Dankworth
- Country of origin: United Kingdom
- Original language: English
- No. of series: 1
- No. of episodes: 15

Original release
- Network: BBC2
- Release: 5 April 1969 – 26 December 1971

Bird's Eye View is a British television series produced by the BBC between 1969 and 1971, initially transmitted on BBC2. It was edited by Edward Mirzoeff, and was filmed entirely from a helicopter.

An initial Bird's Eye View of Great Britain was shown on Christmas Eve 1967 and repeated a year later. The full series contained the following editions:

  - The Englishman's Home by John Betjeman (5 April 1969; repeated 18 August 1971, 24 February 1974, 4 July 1983, 20 May 1987, 5 December 1992)
  - Man on the Move by Correlli Barnett, narrated by Leo McKern (25 May 1969; repeated 25 August 1971, 3 March 1974)
  - A Green and Pleasant Land by John Lloyd, narrated by Alan Dobie (22 June 1969; repeated 8 September 1971, 1 September 1972)
  - Portmeirion by Clough Williams-Ellis (28 June 1969)
  - The Island Fortress by John Terraine, narrated by Robert Lang (26 October 1969; repeated 31 August 1972, 10 March 1974, 24 May 1983, 6 June 1991)
  - John Bull's Workshop by Correlli Barnett, narrated by Alan Dobie (30 November 1969; repeated 30 August 1972)
  - Beside the Seaside by John Betjeman (25 December 1969; repeated 8 September 1972, 25 February 1973, 19 August 1977, 5 July 1983, 18 May 1987, 13 April 1989, 21 November 1992)
  - The Highlands and Islands of Scotland by William Carrocher (25 January 1970; repeated 11 August 1971, 25 March 1973, 25 May 1983)
  - What a Lovely Day by John Lloyd; main voice John le Mesurier (22 March 1970; repeated 3 April 1972)
  - Eastern Approach by Stuart Hood, narrated by Gordon Jackson (17 May 1970; repeated 1 September 1971, 26 May 1983, 6 June 1989, 17 August 1990, 28 November 1992)
  - From Bishop Rock to Muckle Flugga by William Carrocher (25 December 1970; repeated 5 September 1972, 20 January 1974, 10 October 1983, 12 May 1989, 12 December 1992)
  - Wales - the Western Stronghold by Rene Cutforth (28 February 1971; repeated 4 September 1972, 19 May 1987, 19 December 1992)
  - Inis Fáil (Isle of Destiny) by James Plunkett (17 March 1971; repeated 6 September 1972, 4 March 1973, 23 August 1992, 15 January 1993; co-produced with Raidió Teilifís Éireann)
  - A Land for All Seasons by John Betjeman (18 April 1971; repeated 22 May 1972, 11 March 1973, 7 July 1983 and 17 May 1989, although the last transmission was not under the Bird's Eye View title)
  - Switzerland by Herbert Meier (26 December 1971; co-produced with SRG SSR, RAI and Bayerischer Rundfunk)

Some editions can be seen on the BBC's website and the two 1969 editions narrated by John Betjeman are available on DVD. Some further editions are available on YouTube.
