= Penelope Chetwode =

English travel writer (1910-1986)

Penelope Valentine Hester Chetwode, Lady Betjeman (14 February 1910 – 11 April 1986) was an English travel writer. She was the only daughter of Field Marshal Lord Chetwode, and the wife of poet laureate Sir John Betjeman. She was born at Aldershot and grew up in northern India, returning to the region in later life.

== Career ==
She is best known for Two Middle-Aged Ladies in Andalusia (1963), her account of travelling through southern Spain on horseback in the summer of 1961. The book has been widely praised: The Independent called it "a classic work of adventure and humour" while Kate Kellaway, in The Guardian, called it "a charming, intrepid story." In 2012, Two Middle-Aged Ladies was reissued by Eland Books.

Chetwode travelled extensively in Himachal Pradesh, India, and wrote Kulu: The End of the Habitable World (1972), an account of her trek from Shimla to the head of the Rohtang Pass. She was also keenly interested in temple architecture of the western Himalayas, about which also she wrote. A collection of her papers is available at the British Library, while a collection of her photographs from Himachal Pradesh is available at the Ancient India and Iran Trust, Cambridge.

== Personal life ==
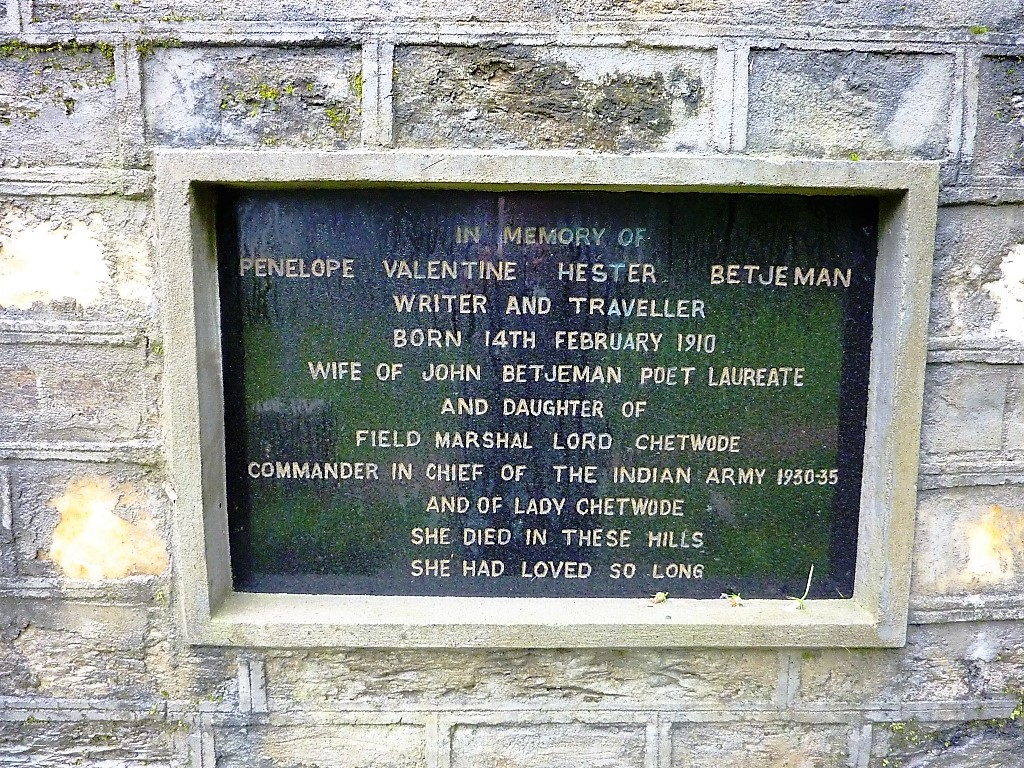
Penelope Chetwode memorial at Khanag, Himachal Pradesh

Chetwode married Sir John Betjeman in London in 1933; the two had become acquainted through their association with the Architectural Review magazine. They had two children, a son (Paul) and a daughter (Candida), now better known as writer Candida Lycett Green. But the marriage eventually broke down, and Chetwode converted to Roman Catholicism in 1948. In 1972 the couple were separated. Later in life she retreated to New House, a cottage on Cusop Hill above the literary town of Hay-on-Wye with her horse.

Chetwode died at village Mutisher, in Himachal Pradesh, India, in 1986, aged 76, while leading a group of tourists on a trek through the Himalayas. The next day, her remains were cremated at the nearby village of Khanag. In 1992, with the support of local villagers, Chetwode's grand-daughter, Imogen Lycett Green (daughter of Candida Lycett Green) erected a memorial stone at Khanag to commemorate Chetwode.
