= Little Snoring =

Village in Norfolk, England

Coordinates: 52.854°N 0.899°E

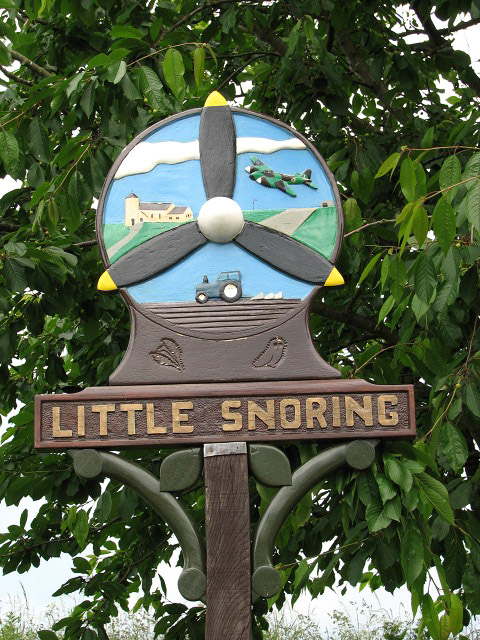
- The village sign at Little Snoring

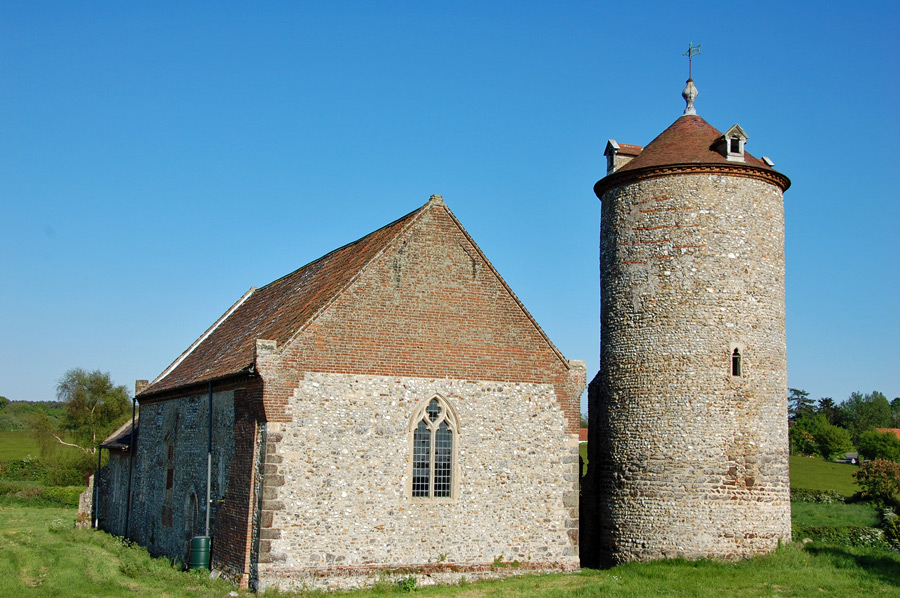
- Little Snoring St Andrew's church

- Location within Norfolk
- Area: 7.31 km^{2} (2.82 sq mi)
- Population: 619 (parish, 2011 Census)
  - Density: 85/km^{2} (220/sq mi)
- OS grid reference: TF958323
  - London: 105 mi (169 km) SSW
- Civil parish: Little Snoring
- District: North Norfolk
- Shire county: Norfolk
- Region: East
- Country: England
- Sovereign state: United Kingdom
- Post town: FAKENHAM
- Postcode district: NR21
- Dialling code: 01328
- Police: Norfolk
- Fire: Norfolk
- Ambulance: East of England
- UK Parliament: North Norfolk

Little Snoring is a village and a civil parish in Norfolk, England.

The village is approximately 2 miles (3 km) east-north-east from the town of Fakenham, 17 miles (27 km) west-south-west from Cromer, and to the side of the A148 road.

At the 2011 Census, it had a population of 619. For the purposes of local government, the parish falls within the district of North Norfolk.

== History ==
Little Snoring has an entry in the Domesday Book of 1085 and is recorded by the names "Esnaringa", "Snaringa" and "Snarlinga", named after "Snare", the settlers' leader, and thus the name Little Snoring evolved over the centuries. It was the king's land with the main landholders being William de Warenne and Peter de Valognes and his main tenant is said to be Ralph.

Historically the name Snoring Parva was used, "parva" being Latin for "smaller" — nearby is Great Snoring.

Within the parish of Little Snoring, at a place called Queensgate, was a house of the Order of Saint Lazarus. It is mentioned in the will of Alexander, Rector of Snoring Parva, in 1380. Nothing further about the house is known.

== Landmarks ==
The church of Little Snoring St Andrew is one of 124 existing round-tower churches in Norfolk. The church and its separate tower are Grade I listed buildings.

The village has an airfield, formerly RAF Little Snoring, part of which is still active as a private airfield, whilst the other part now belongs to a potato-producing company.

== Amenities ==
Village amenities include a school, post office and the Green Man public house.

The nearest railway station is at Sheringham for the Bittern Line which runs between Sheringham, Cromer and Norwich. The nearest airport is Norwich International Airport.
