= Statue of John Betjeman =

Statue in St Pancras station, London

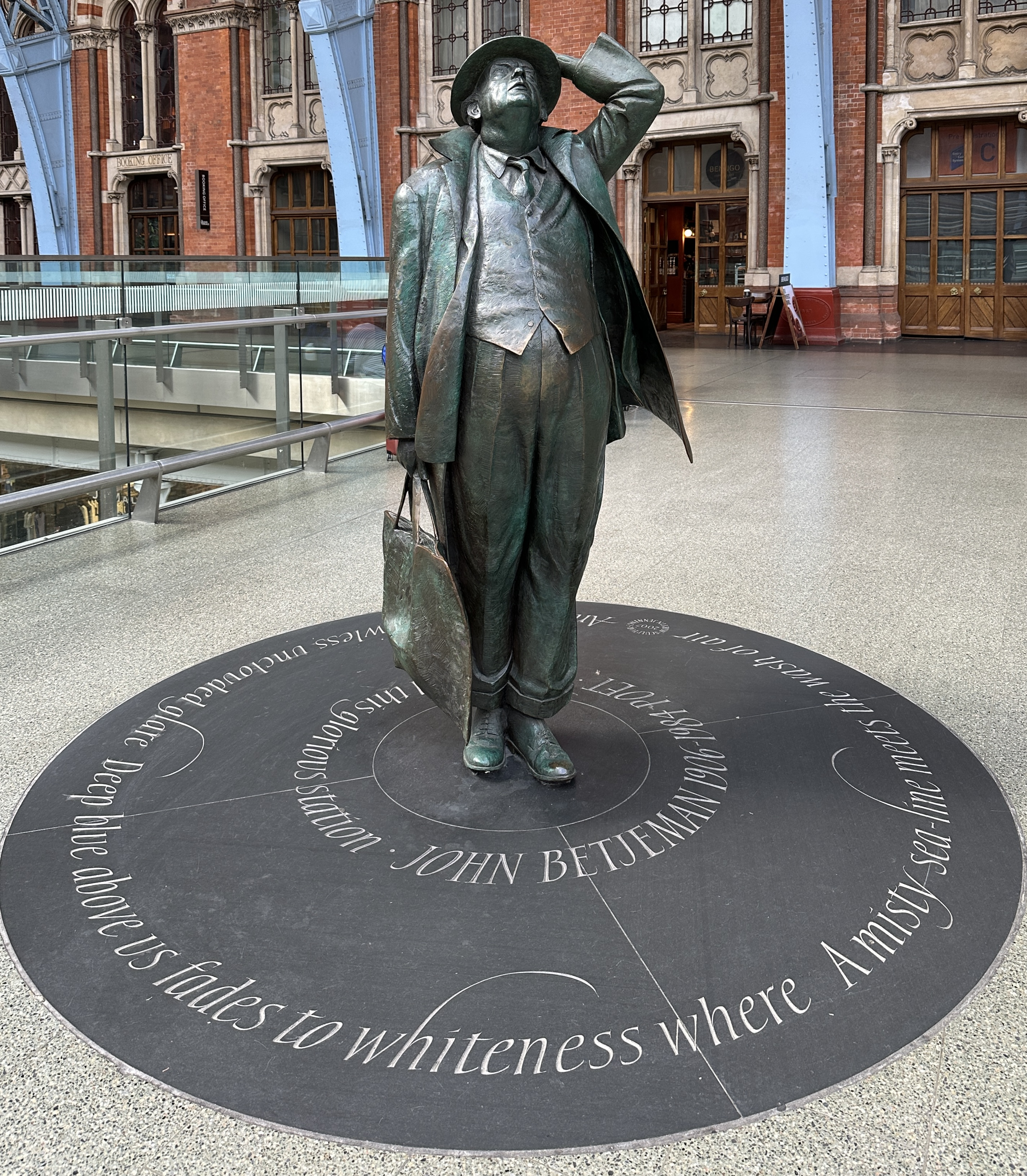
- Artist: Martin Jennings
- Completion date: 2007
- Type: Sculpture
- Medium: Bronze
- Subject: John Betjeman
- Dimensions: 2.10 m (6.9 ft)
- Location: St Pancras railway station, London; 51.530278°N 0.125556°W

The Statue of John Betjeman at St Pancras railway station, London is a depiction in bronze by the sculptor Martin Jennings. The statue was designed and cast in 2007 and was unveiled on 12 November 2007 by Betjeman's daughter, Candida Lycett Green and the then Poet Laureate Andrew Motion to commemorate Betjeman and mark the opening of St Pancras International as the London terminus of the Eurostar high-speed rail link between Great Britain and mainland Europe. The location memorialises the connection between St Pancras station and Betjeman, an early and lifelong advocate of Victorian architecture who led the campaign to save the station from demolition in the 1960s.

== Background ==
=== John Betjeman ===
The poet John Betjeman (1906–1984) was an early supporter of Victorian architecture and a founding member of the Victorian Society. At the time of its founding in 1957, appreciation of Victorian architecture and its architects was at its nadir: critics wrote of "the nineteenth century architectural tragedy", ridiculed "the uncompromising ugliness" of the era's buildings and attacked the "sadistic hatred of beauty" of its architects. The commonly held view had been expressed by P. G. Wodehouse in his 1937 novel, Summer Moonshine; "Whatever may be said in favour of the Victorians, it is pretty generally admitted that few of them were to be trusted within reach of a trowel and a pile of bricks." The Victorian Society met with an early defeat when, in 1961, British Railways destroyed the Euston Arch, Philip Hardwick's Doric entrance to Euston Station. British Railways proved a perennial opponent and in the mid-1960s, they announced plans to demolish both St Pancras Station and the attached Midland Hotel, and King's Cross station. As vice-chairman of the society, Betjeman led the campaign to save St Pancras. In June 1966 he wrote to Sir John Summerson, noted architectural historian and curator of the Soane Museum; "would you be prepared to write an appreciative article on it? You count and I don't". Summerson's initial response was unsupportive, "every time I look at the building I'm consumed with admiration in the cleverness of the detail, and every time I leave it I wonder why as a whole it is so nauseating. I really don't think one could go to a Minister and say this is a great piece of architecture". Summerson subsequently recanted, and his support was instrumental in achieving Grade I listed building status for the station and hotel in 1967, a designation which ensured its survival.

=== George Gilbert Scott ===
"My eye just now caught the word 'restoration' in the morning papers, and on looking closer, I saw that this time it is nothing less than the Minster of Tewkesbury that is to be destroyed by Sir George Gilbert Scott."

— William Morris on Scott's plans for Tewkesbury Abbey.

On his death in 1878, George Gilbert Scott was accorded a funeral and burial in Westminster Abbey, a mark of recognition for the foremost architect of his age. He left a fortune of £120,000 and a substantial legacy of churches, cathedrals, houses, and public buildings. His prodigious output had been made possible by his running the largest architectural practice in Victorian England. (Note: The scale of Scott's practice was such that he often had little detailed appreciation of the works that were being produced in his name. David Cole records the, possibly apocryphal, story of Scott arriving late at night in a Midlands town and criticising progress being made on one of his churches, for the clerk of works to reply, "You know Mr Scott, this is not your church, this is Mr Street's; your church is further down the road".) When his attention was fully applied, Scott's best work was among the most distinguished the Victorian era produced; these include the Albert Memorial, the Foreign Office and the Midland Hotel. But even before his death, Scott's reputation had begun to decline; a furious attack by William Morris on Scott's proposed restoration of Tewkesbury Abbey led to the formation of the Society for the Protection of Ancient Buildings. By the time of Betjeman's campaign to save his station, Scott's reputation was at its lowest; the critic Reginald Turnor belatedly thanked Lord Palmerston for his "obstinacy, which spared us a St Pancras in Whitehall". (Note: Turnor perpetuated the myth that Scott reworked his original designs for the Foreign Office, which Palmerston rejected demanding that the building be Classical in design. In fact, although Scott drew on his understanding of French and Italian medieval details, the design for St Pancras was wholly new.)

=== St Pancras Station ===
As reviled as its creator for much of the 20th century, in the 21st, St Pancras was renovated in a multi-million pound, and much admired, restoration. Its significance is recognised, Simon Bradley describing it as, "this greatest of High Victorian secular buildings" and its Historic England listing suggesting that it may be "Britain's most impressive station", with only the Great Eastern Railway terminus at Liverpool Street station being posited as its rival as, "the largest and handsomest railway-station in England".

== The statue ==
The statue of John Betjeman is by the sculptor Martin Jennings. Of bronze and larger than life-size, it was cast by Pangolin Editions at their Gloucestershire foundry. It shows Betjeman clad in suit, mackintosh and trilby hat, capturing his "shabby appearance, shoelace and scruffy collar are undone...knotted string for one shoelace". The poet holds his hat as he gazes up at the roof of the station. The 2.10 m (6.9 ft) statue stands on a plinth of Cumbrian slate with words from some of Betjeman's poems inscribed in the base. The central text reads: "And in the shadowless unclouded glare, Deep blue above us fades to whiteness where, A misty sealine meets the wash of air. / John Betjeman, 1906 – 1984, poet, who saved this glorious station". The statue was unveiled by the poet's daughter, Candida Lycett Green and the Poet Laureate Andrew Motion on 12 November 2007.

== Sources ==
- Betjeman, John (1995). Candida Lycett Green (ed.). Letters: 1951–1984. Vol. 2. London: Methuen Publishing. ISBN 978-0-413-66940-7. OCLC 468502327.
- Bradley, Simon (2007). St Pancras Station. London: Profile Books. ISBN 978-1-8619-7951-3. OCLC 70264624.
- Cherry, Bridget; Pevsner, Nikolaus (2002). London 4: North. The Buildings of England. New Haven, US and London: Yale University Press. ISBN 9780300096538.
- Clark, Kenneth (1983). The Gothic Revival: An Essay in the History of Taste. London: John Murray. ISBN 978-0-7195-3102-6. OCLC 1072302955.
- Cole, David (1978). C. M. Kaufman (ed.). Sir Gilbert Scott (1811–1878): Architect of the Gothic Revival. London: Victoria & Albert Museum. OCLC 931333814.
- Curl, James Stevens (1990). Victorian Architecture. Newton Abbot, Devon: David & Charles. ISBN 978-07153-9144-0. OCLC 185759763.
- Peter Ferriday, ed. (1963). Victorian Architecture. London: Jonathan Cape. OCLC 270335.
- Harries, Susie (2011). Nikolaus Pevsner – The Life. London: Chatto & Windus. ISBN 9780701168391.
- Stamp, Gavin (2015). Gothic For The Steam Age: An Illustrated Biography of George Gilbert Scott. London: Aurum Press. ISBN 978-1-78131-124-0. OCLC 980892536.
- Turnor, Reginald (1950). Nineteenth Century Architecture in Britain. London: Batsford. OCLC 520344.
