= Edward Mirzoeff =

British television producer and documentary filmmaker (born 1936)

Edward Mirzoeff (born 11 April 1936) is a British television producer and documentary filmmaker.

== Early life ==
Edward Mirzoeff was born in London to Eliachar Mirzoeff and Penina (née Asherov). He attended Hasmonean Grammar School, before winning an Open Scholarship in Modern History to The Queen's College, Oxford in 1953, obtaining a BA (Oxon) in 1956, MA (Oxon) in 1960.

== Film work ==
Mirzoeff worked at BBC Television from 1963 to 2000, latterly as Executive Producer, Documentaries. His wide-ranging studies of British institutions for the BBC include the Royal Green Jackets (a former regiment of the British Army), New Scotland Yard, the National Trust, Westminster School, the Royal Opera House and the Ritz Hotel.

Mirzoeff was given unprecedented access and attracted record-breaking audiences for his 1992 portrait of Queen Elizabeth II, Elizabeth R., marking her 40th anniversary on the throne. Subsequently, he was appointed Commander of the Royal Victorian Order.

Mirzoeff also made a series of films with the late Poet Laureate Sir John Betjeman (notably Metro-land, 1973, A Passion for Churches, 1974, and The Queen's Realm - A Prospect of England, 1977) and directed many other leading presenters, including James Cameron, Ludovic Kennedy and Malcolm Muggeridge. Many of his films, such as The Front Garden, and The Englishwoman and the Horse, are poetic celebrations of Englishness. He has edited numerous series, from the innovative Bird's-Eye View, shot entirely from a helicopter (1969-1971) to the controversial Real Lives, Year of the French (1982–83), and the BBC2 40 Minutes documentary strand, which he edited for four years, 1985–89. He was executive producer of numerous other programmes and series, including Pandora's Box, The Ark, The House, Full Circle with Michael Palin and Lie of the Land. He produced the first ten of the annual Richard Dimbleby Lectures (BBC1, 1972-1982), and three series of lectures by the historian AJP Taylor.

In 2022 he was credited as consultant on the cinema documentary Elizabeth, directed by Roger Michell.

== Awards and honours ==
Mirzoeff's awards include four BAFTAs (among them the Alan Clarke Award for outstanding creative contribution to television), the Samuelson Award, a British Film Institute Television Award, British Video Award, an International Emmy, and the awards of the Broadcasting Press Guild and the Royal Philharmonic Society.

Mirzoeff was appointed CVO in 1993, and CBE in 1997 for his contribution to Documentary. He was Chairman of BAFTA (The British Academy of Film and Television Arts), from 1995 to 1997, and Chairman of The Grierson Trust from 2002 to 2006. He has served on the Boards of the David Lean BAFTA Foundation, the Salisbury Cathedral Council, and the Directors' and Producers' Rights Society, and is a Vice-President of The Betjeman Society.

== Personal life ==
Mirzoeff married Judith Topper in 1961 and has three sons and five grandchildren.

He was elected to the Garrick Club, London, in 2003.
