= Metro-land (1973 film) =

1973 British TV programme

- Title card of Metro-land
- Written by: John Betjeman
- Narrated by: John Betjeman
- Country of origin: United Kingdom
- Original language: English

Production
- Producer: Edward Mirzoeff
- Cinematography: John McGlashan
- Running time: 50 minutes

Original release
- Network: BBC One
- Release: 26 February 1973

Metro-land is a BBC documentary film written and narrated by the Poet Laureate of the United Kingdom, Sir John Betjeman. The film was produced by Edward Mirzoeff, and first broadcast on 26 February 1973. It celebrates suburban life in the area to the northwest of London, which grew up in the early 20th century around the Metropolitan Railway (MR), later the Metropolitan line of the London Underground.

"Live in Metro-land" was a slogan coined by the MR for promotional purposes in about 1915 and used for about twenty years until shortly after the incorporation of the MR into the railways division of the London Passenger Transport Board in 1933. As Betjeman puts it at the beginning of Metro-land, it was a "Child of the First War, forgotten by the Second". Betjeman carries with him, as he travels, the pamphlet guide to Metro-land from the 1920s. The film was critically acclaimed and is fondly remembered. A DVD was released in 2006 to coincide with the centenary of Betjeman's birth.

== The concept ==
According to its creator Edward Mirzoeff, the programme was conceived in 1971 over a lunch with John Betjeman at Wheeler's Restaurant in Soho. The two had recently collaborated on a BBC series called Bird's-Eye View, which offered an aerial vision of Britain. Metro-land was directly commissioned by Robin Scott, Controller of BBC2, with the initial working title of "The Joys of Urban Living", following a flowery letter from Betjeman. As completed, it is a series of vignettes of life in the suburbs of Metro-land, drawn together by Betjeman's commentary—partly in verse—whose text was published in 1978 and interwoven with black-and-white film shot from a Metropolitan Railway (MR) train in 1910. It is 49 minutes in length.

== Locations in Metro-land ==
Betjeman's first appearance in Metro-land is over the remains of a pint of beer in a station buffet. This sequence was filmed at Horsted Keynes, on the Bluebell Railway in Sussex. Other locations include:

- Chiltern Court, an apartment block constructed over Baker Street station, the MR's London terminus; in 1972 (the year of filming) the block still contained a restaurant. The restaurant is now The Metropolitan Bar, part of the Wetherspoons chain;
- Marlborough Road, a station closed in 1939, whose booking hall had by the time of filming become an Angus Steak House. (This subsequently became a Chinese restaurant and then returned to railway use in 2012, supporting the new S Stock trains on the Metropolitan line.) Betjeman also mentions the house where Thomas Hood died, near the station, where the railway cut through the garden;
- St John's Wood: Betjeman concentrates on St John's Wood as a Victorian suburb and, in particular, the former residence of a clergyman, John Hugh Smyth-Pigott, "whose Clapton congregation declared him to be Christ,/a compliment he accepted". This house, situated in Langford Place, has since been the home variously of Charles Saatchi and of Vanessa Feltz;

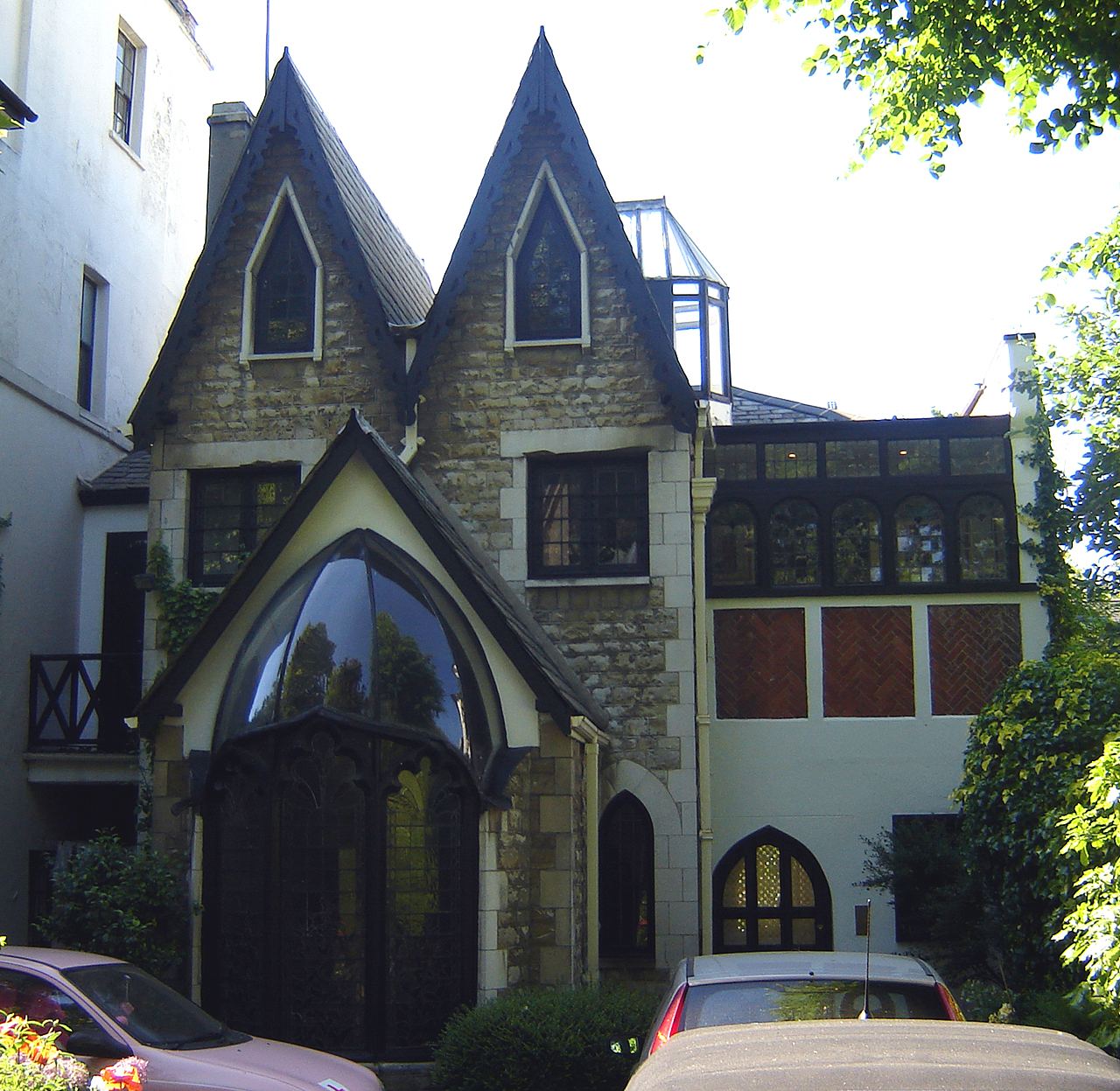
The house in Langford Place, St John's Wood

- Neasden, caricatured since 1962 by the satirical magazine Private Eye (for which Betjeman wrote) as the stereotypical "contemporary urban environment". Betjeman describes Neasden as "home of the gnome and the average citizen" (the former a reference to the preponderance of gnome statuettes in suburban front gardens). Background music is provided by William Rushton's recording of "Neasden" (1972) ("Neasden/You won't be sorry that you breezed in"), another Private Eye spin-off. It was re-mixed and re-mastered for the programme. On to the Neasden Nature Trail (through Gladstone Park and the Brook Road allotments—now no longer accessible from Brook Road), and its creator, the ornithologist Eric Simms;
- Wembley, site of the British Empire Exhibition in 1924–25 and the stadium (demolished and rebuilt in the early 21st century), which first hosted the Football Association Cup Final in 1923 and where England had won the World Cup six years before Metro-land was filmed. (Chants of "England!" can be heard in the background as Betjeman stands alone on the stadium pitch.) Betjeman recounts the partial construction (1890) on the site of the present stadium of "Watkin's Folly" (after Sir Edward Watkin, Chairman of the MR), which had been intended to exceed the Eiffel Tower in Paris. The "Folly" was demolished in 1907. He also recalls the British Empire Exhibition and a St George's Day rally held there in 1924;
- Harrow: Harrow School and Grim's Dyke, Harrow Weald, where the lyricist W. S. Gilbert, collaborator of Arthur Sullivan, drowned in the lake in 1911, after suffering a heart attack. Betjeman recounts that Gilbert had gone swimming with two girls, Ruby Preece and Winifred Isabel Emery. Ruby later became known as the artist Patricia Preece, who was the second wife of Stanley Spencer;
- Pinner: Pinner Fair, described by Betjeman as "a mediaeval fair in Metro-land";
- Moor Park Rickmansworth, on whose golf course Betjeman is filmed missing a tee shot, and laughing uproariously. The fine club-house, an 18th-century mansion, is also shown.
- Croxley Green: with a hint of irony, Betjeman refers to the Croxley Green "revels" as "a tradition that stretches back to 1952";
- Chorleywood, which Betjeman calls "essential Metro-land". He visits Chorleywood Common and The Orchard, an Arts and Crafts house (1899) designed by Charles Voysey (1857–1941), about whom he had written an article in the Architectural Review in 1931. Elsewhere in Chorleywood, Betjeman listens to local resident Len Rawle perform on the Wurlitzer organ from the Empire cinema in Leicester Square, which had been installed in his house. (The organ was still there in 2006, when Rawle performed for a BBC film, Betjeman and Me, made by Dan Cruickshank to mark Betjeman's centenary);
- Amersham, the terminus of the Metropolitan by 1972, where Betjeman visits High and Over (1929), a house designed by Amyas Connell in the moderne style ("perhaps old-fashioned today") that overlooked the town. (Thirty years earlier he had referred, rather contemptuously, to "an absurd admiration of what is modern, as though 'modern' meant always a flat roof, a window at the corner ... in fact not genuine contemporary architecture at all but 'jazz'".) Of the former Metropolitan beyond Amersham, Betjeman remarked, "In those wet fields the railway didn't pay/The Metro stops at Amersham today";

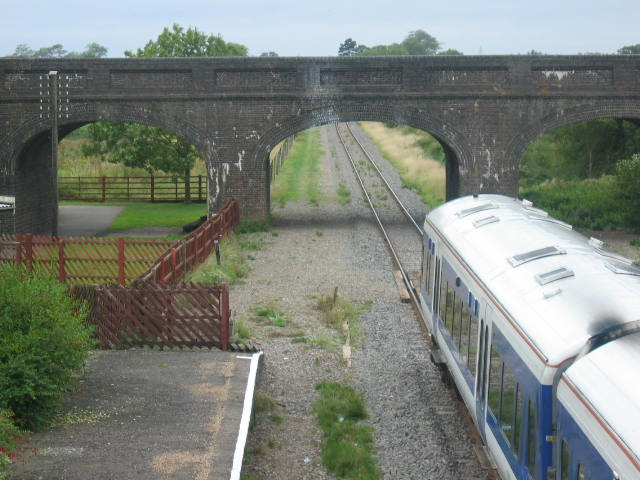
End of the line: Quainton Road in the direction of Verney Junction, 2006

- Quainton Road, a station in the outer reaches of Buckinghamshire that was finally closed to Metropolitan passengers in 1948, but has since become home to the Buckinghamshire Railway Centre. Betjeman reminisces of having sat there in the autumn of 1929 watching the Brill tram depart. His daughter Candida Lycett Green organised an excursion from Marylebone to Quainton Road in 2006, using the extant freight line from Aylesbury, to mark his centenary;
- Verney Junction, near to the Claydons, the most distant outpost of the Metropolitan, closed since 1936, which by the 1970s had largely been reclaimed by nature. Betjeman appeared to close the programme here with the words, "Grass triumphs. And I must say I'm rather glad", although the scene was in fact filmed at Shipton Lee, some five miles to the south of the former terminus.

== Critical reception ==
In general, Metro-land was favourably and warmly received. Miles Kington wrote to Mirzoeff that it was "just about the most satisfying TV programme, on all levels, that I've ever seen". Clive James, writing in The Observer, dubbed it an "instant classic" and predicted accurately that "they'll be repeating it until the millennium".

It was shown on BBC Four in 2006, in the same week that the DVD was released. The production has been shown several times since then, including on 26 February 2023 to mark the fiftieth anniversary of its first transmission. Christopher Booker rated it as the best of Betjeman's television programmes ("Like others, I have been endlessly grateful ... over the years for the more public activities of the 'outer' Betjeman"), while Betjeman's biographer A. N. Wilson recalled that it was "too good to be described simply as a 'programme'".

In a contemporaneous review for the London Evening Standard, Simon Jenkins launched into imitative verse: "For an hour he held enraptured/Pinner, Moor Park, Chorley Wood./'Well I'm blowed' they said, 'He likes us./Knew one day that someone should".

== Music soundtrack ==
"Tiger Rag" by the Temperance Seven is heard over the opening title sequence, a 33 rpm vinyl disc played at 45 rpm to provide "a suitably manic sound" and is followed by "Build a Little Home" by Roy Fox. As Betjeman sits at a table in the Chiltern Court restaurant, "When the Daisy Opens her Eyes" by Albert Sandler plays. When Betjeman looks at 12 Langford Place, 'Agapemone', 'the abode of love', country house of the Reverend John Hugh Smyth-Pigott, "The Witch of Endor" from "Le Roi David" by Arthur Honegger is heard.

The sequence at Neasden is accompanied by the song of the same name by William Rushton. The Wembley sequence features three tunes: Elgar's "Civic Fanfare", towards the beginning, Walford Davies' "Solemn Melody" (as Betjeman stands in the Palace of Arts), while the pleasure park footage uses the beginning and the end of the 1926 recording of "Masculine Women, Feminine Men" by the Savoy Havana Band. The section that features people working in Harrow is accompanied by "Family Favourites" by Rod McNeil and "Down by the Lazy River" by The Osmonds.

During the sequence at Harrow School, the "Harrow School Song" is heard. When the sequence of stained-glass windows at Harrow are shown, "Sunny Side of the Street" by Jack Hylton plays. Part of the segment on Grim's Dyke in Harrow Weald is accompanied by "Tit Willow" by Gilbert and Sullivan.

"Golfing Love" by Melville Gideon accompanies the footage featuring golfers at Moor Park, and while the paintings in the Moor Park clubhouse are shown, Handel's Double Concerti plays. During the Pinner Carnival, "Metal Guru" by T Rex can be heard in the background. "Build a Little Home" is played again during part of the sequence at Chorleywood. The sequence featuring Len Rawle and his Wurlitzer is accompanied by the works: "Crimond", "Varsity Rag", and "Chattanooga Choo Choo". Finally, during part of the sequence showing High and Over, "Everything I Own" by Bread is heard.
