= Slough (poem) =

Poem by Sir John Betjeman

Come, friendly bombs, and fall on Slough!
It isn't fit for humans now,
There isn't grass to graze a cow.
Swarm over, Death!

— First verse

"Slough" is a ten-stanza poem by Sir John Betjeman first published in his 1937 collection Continual Dew.

The British town of Slough was used as a dump for war surplus materials in the interwar years and then abruptly became the home of 850 new factories just before World War II. The sudden appearance of this "trading estate", which was quickly widely reproduced throughout Britain, prompted the poem. Seeing the new appearance of the town, Betjeman was struck by the "menace of things to come". He later regretted the poem's harshness. The poem is not about Slough specifically, but about the desecration caused by industrialisation and modernity in general, with the transformation of Slough being the epitome of these evils. Nevertheless, successive mayors of Slough have objected to the poem.

The poem was published two years before the outbreak of World War II, during which Britain (including Slough itself) experienced actual air raids. Much later, in a guide to English churches, Betjeman referred to some churches as "beyond the tentacles of Slough" and "dangerously near Slough". However, on the centenary of Betjeman's birth in 2006, his daughter apologised for the poem. Candida Lycett Green said her father "regretted having ever written it". During her visit, Lycett Green presented the Mayor of Slough, David MacIsaac, with a book of her father's poems. In it was written "We love Slough."

== Responses ==
In 2005, Ian McMillan published a poem titled "Slough Re-visited" using the same metre and rhyme-scheme as Betjeman's original, but celebrating Slough and rejecting mockery of the town as unfair.

Punk band Gallows, who originally formed in Slough and whose singer Frank Carter has frequently expressed his dislike for the town in interviews, have several references to Betjeman's poem in their music. Their album Orchestra of Wolves features a song entitled "Come Friendly Bombs". An earlier song, entitled "Swarm Over Death" (released on the band's 2005 demo), features the lyrics "Come friendly bombs/ And fall here now/ It isn't fit for humans now/ Swarm over death."

In the television series The Office, which is set in Slough, the character David Brent (portrayed by Ricky Gervais) reads extracts of the poem interjected with comments such as "You don't solve town planning problems by dropping bombs all over the place, so he's embarrassed himself there, next." The poem is reproduced in full on the liner of the video and DVD releases of the series. A more complete reading was included in deleted scenes released in 2011.
