= John Betjeman =

English poet (1906–1984)

Sir John Betjeman CBE
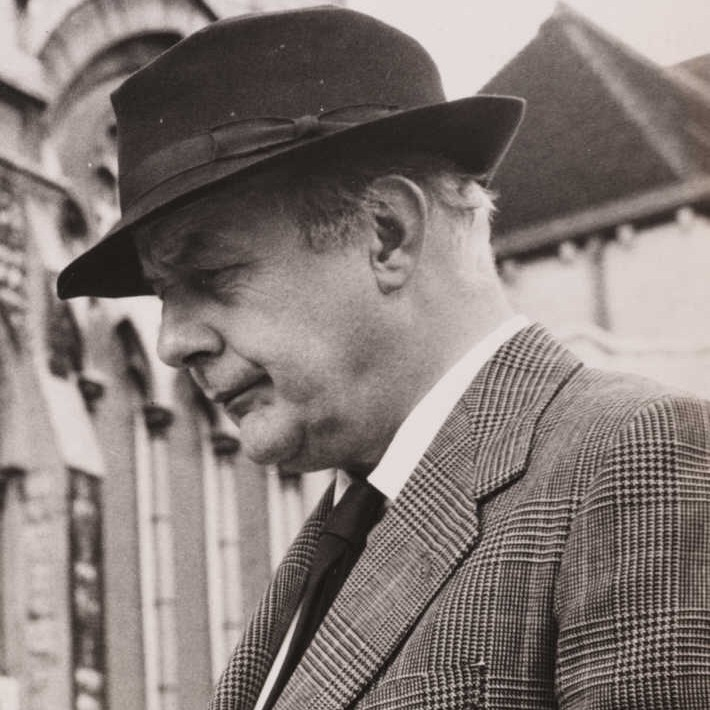
- Betjeman in 1961

Poet Laureate of the United Kingdom
- In office 20 October 1972 – 19 May 1984
- Monarch: Elizabeth II
- Preceded by: Cecil Day-Lewis
- Succeeded by: Ted Hughes

Personal details
- Born: John Betjemann; 28 August 1906 London, England
- Died: 19 May 1984 (aged 77) Trebetherick, Cornwall, England
- Spouse: Penelope Chetwode (m. 1933; sep. 1972)
- Domestic partner: Lady Elizabeth Cavendish
- Children: 2, including Candida Lycett Green
- Education: Magdalen College, Oxford
- Occupation: Poet; writer; broadcaster

Sir John Betjeman (/ˈbɛtʃəmən/; 28 August 1906 – 19 May 1984) was an English poet, writer, and broadcaster. He was Poet Laureate from 1972 until his death. He was a founding member of The Victorian Society and first president of The Hackney Society and a passionate defender of Victorian architecture, helping to save St Pancras railway station from demolition. He began his career as a journalist and ended it as one of the most popular British Poets Laureate and a much-loved figure on British television.

== Life ==
=== Early life and education ===
John Betjeman was born on 28 August 1906 in London to a prosperous furniture maker of Dutch descent. His parents, Mabel (née Dawson) and Ernest Betjemann, had a family firm at 34–42 Pentonville Road which manufactured the kind of ornamental household furniture and gadgets distinctive to Victorians.

During the First World War the family name was changed to the less German-looking Betjeman. His father's forebears had actually come from the present day Netherlands more than a century earlier, setting up their home and business in Islington, London, and during the Fourth Anglo-Dutch War had, ironically, added the extra "-n" to avoid the anti-Dutch sentiment existing at the time.

Betjeman was baptised at St Anne's Church, Highgate Rise, a 19th-century church at the foot of Highgate West Hill. The family lived at Parliament Hill Mansions in the Lissenden Gardens private estate in Gospel Oak in north west London.

In 1909, the Betjemanns moved half a mile north to more opulent Highgate. From West Hill they lived in the reflected glory of the Burdett-Coutts estate:

Here from my eyrie, as the sun went down,
I heard the old North London puff and shunt,
Glad that I did not live in Gospel Oak.

Betjeman's early schooling was at the local Byron House and Highgate School, where he was taught by poet T. S. Eliot. After this, he boarded at the Dragon School preparatory school in North Oxford and Marlborough College, a private school in Wiltshire. In his penultimate year, he joined the secret Society of Amici in which he was a contemporary of both Louis MacNeice and Graham Shepard. He founded The Heretick, a satirical magazine that lampooned Marlborough's obsession with sport. While at school, his exposure to the works of Arthur Machen won him over to High Church Anglicanism, a conversion of importance to his later writing and conception of the arts. Betjeman left Marlborough in July 1925.

=== Magdalen College, Oxford ===
Betjeman entered the University of Oxford with difficulty, having failed the mathematics portion of the university's matriculation exam, Responsions. He was, however, admitted as a commoner (i.e., a non-scholarship student) at Magdalen College and entered the newly created School of English Language and Literature. At Oxford, Betjeman made little use of the academic opportunities. His tutor, a young C. S. Lewis, regarded him as an "idle prig" and Betjeman in turn considered Lewis unfriendly, demanding, and uninspiring as a teacher. Betjeman particularly disliked the coursework's emphasis on linguistics, and dedicated most of his time to cultivating his social life, his interest in English ecclesiastical architecture, and private literary pursuits.

At Oxford, he was a friend of Maurice Bowra, later to be Warden of Wadham (1938 to 1970). Betjeman had a poem published in Isis, the university magazine, and served as editor of the Cherwell student newspaper during 1927. His first book of poems was privately printed with the help of fellow student Edward James. He brought his teddy bear Archibald Ormsby-Gore up to Magdalen with him, the memory of which inspired his Oxford contemporary Evelyn Waugh to include Sebastian Flyte's teddy Aloysius in Brideshead Revisited. Much of this period of his life is recorded in his blank verse autobiography, Summoned by Bells, published in 1960 and made into a television film in 1976.

It is a common misapprehension, cultivated by Betjeman himself, that he did not complete his degree because he failed to pass the compulsory holy scripture examination, known colloquially as "Divvers", short for "Divinity". In Hilary term 1928, Betjeman failed Divinity for the second time. He had to leave the university for the Trinity term to prepare for a retake of the exam; he was then allowed to return in October. Betjeman then wrote to the Secretary of the Tutorial Board at Magdalen, G. C. Lee, asking to be entered for the Pass School, a set of examinations taken on rare occasions by undergraduates who are deemed unlikely to achieve an honours degree. In Summoned by Bells Betjeman claims that his tutor, C. S. Lewis, said "You'd have only got a third" – but he had informed the tutorial board that he thought Betjeman would not achieve an honours degree of any class.

Permission to sit the Pass School was granted. Betjeman decided to offer a paper in Welsh. Osbert Lancaster tells the story that a tutor came by train twice a week (first class) from Aberystwyth to teach Betjeman. However, Jesus College had a number of Welsh tutors who more probably would have taught him. Betjeman finally had to leave at the end of the Michaelmas term, 1928. Betjeman did pass his Divinity examination on his third try but was expelled after failing the Pass School. He had achieved a satisfactory result in only one of the three required papers (on Shakespeare and other English authors). Betjeman's academic failure at Oxford rankled him for the rest of his life and he was never reconciled with C. S. Lewis, towards whom he nursed a bitter detestation. This situation was perhaps complicated by his enduring love of Oxford, from which he accepted an honorary doctorate of letters in 1974.

=== After university ===
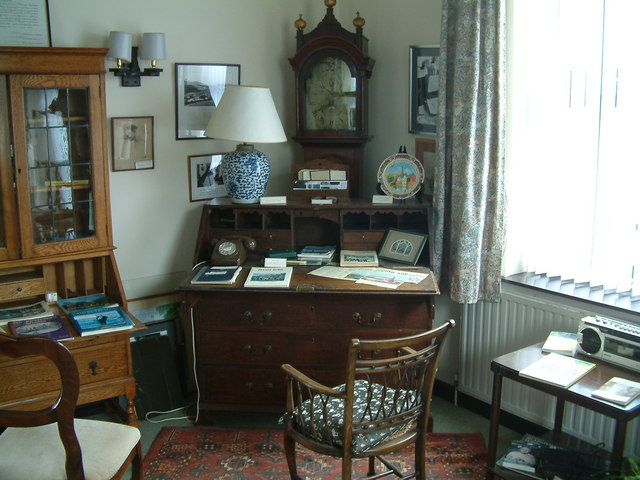
The John Betjeman Centre Memorabilia Room showing the office from his home in Trebetherick

Betjeman left Oxford without a degree. Whilst there, however, he had made the acquaintance of people who would later influence his work, including Louis MacNeice and W. H. Auden. He worked briefly as a private secretary, school teacher and film critic for the Evening Standard, where he also wrote for their high-society gossip column, the "Londoner's Diary". He was employed by the Architectural Review between 1930 and 1935, as a full-time assistant editor, following their publishing of some of his freelance work. Timothy Mowl (2000) says, "His years at the Architectural Review were to be his true university". At this time, while his prose style matured, he joined the MARS Group, an organisation of young modernist architects and architectural critics in Britain.

In 1937, Betjeman was a churchwarden at Uffington, the Berkshire village (in Oxfordshire since boundary changes of 1974) where he lived from 1934 to 1945. That year, he paid for the cleaning of the church's royal arms and later presided over the conversion of the church's oil lamps to electricity.

The Shell Guides were developed by Betjeman and Jack Beddington, a friend who was publicity manager with Shell-Mex & BP, to guide Britain's growing number of motorists around the counties of Britain and their historical sites. They were published by the Architectural Press and financed by Shell. By the start of World War II, 13 had been published, of which Cornwall (1934) and Devon (1936) were written by Betjeman. A third, Shropshire, was written with and designed by his good friend John Piper in 1951.

In 1939, Betjeman was rejected for military service in World War II but found war work with the films division of the Ministry of Information. In 1941, he became British press attaché in neutral Dublin, Ireland, working with Sir John Maffey. He is reported to have been selected for murder by the IRA. The order was rescinded after a meeting with an unnamed Old IRA man who was impressed by his works.

Betjeman wrote poems based on his experiences in Ireland during the "Emergency" (the war) including "The Irish Unionist's Farewell to Greta Hellstrom in 1922" (written during the war) which contained the refrain "Dungarvan in the rain". The object of his affections, "Greta", remained a mystery until revealed to have been a member of a well-known Anglo-Irish family of Western county Waterford. His official brief included establishing friendly contacts with leading figures in the Dublin literary scene: he befriended Patrick Kavanagh, then at the very start of his career. Kavanagh celebrated the birth of Betjeman's daughter with a poem "Candida"; another well-known poem contains the line Let John Betjeman call for me in a car. From March to November 1944 Betjeman was assigned to another wartime job, working on publicity for the Admiralty in Bath.

=== After the Second World War ===
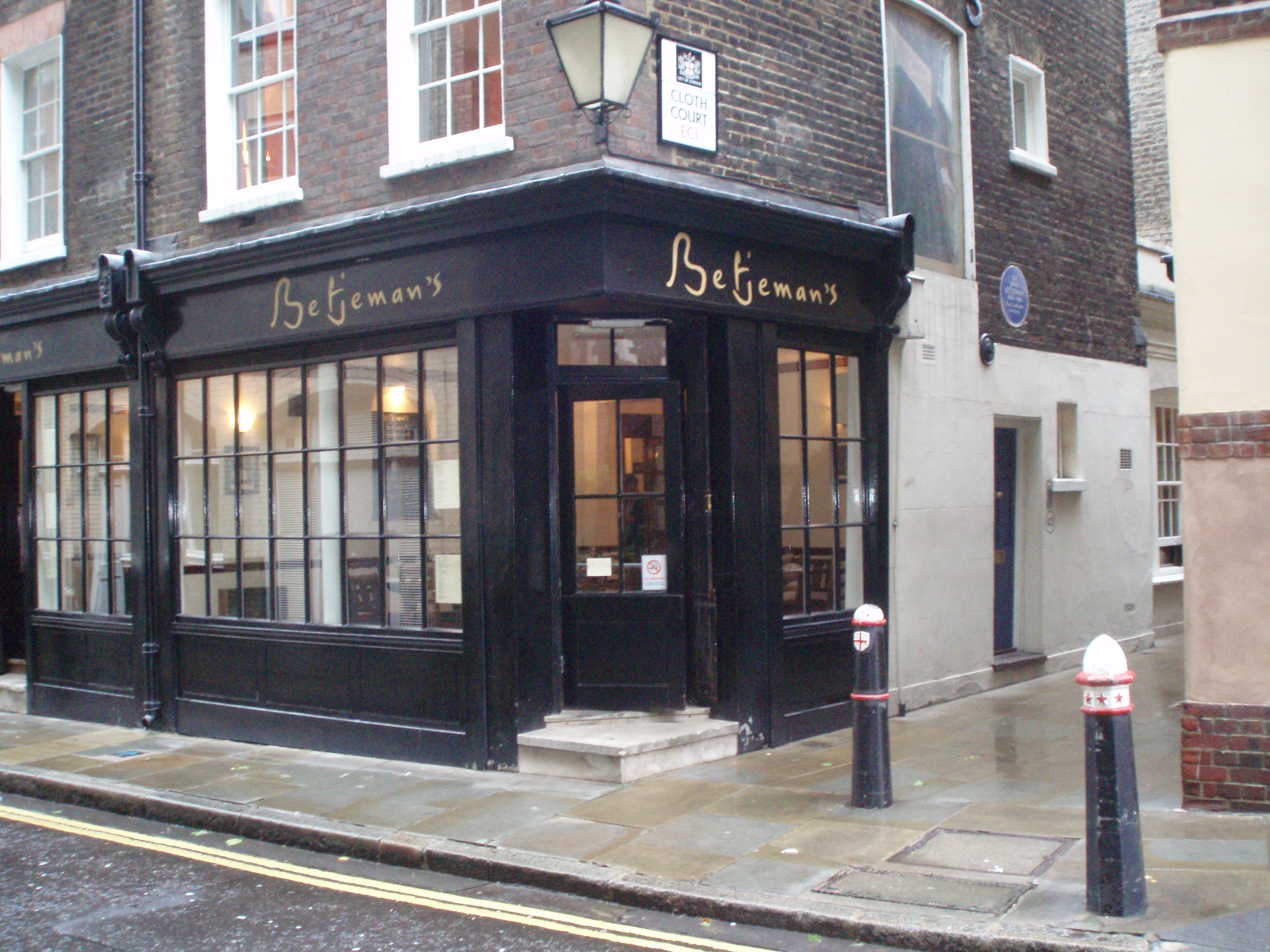
Betjeman's house in Cloth Fair in the City of London, marked with a blue plaque (August 2007)

By 1948, Betjeman had published more than a dozen books. Five of these were verse collections, including one in the US. Sales of his Collected Poems in 1958 reached 100,000. The popularity of the book prompted Ken Russell to make a film about him, John Betjeman: A Poet in London (1959). Filmed in 35 mm and running 11 minutes and 35 seconds, it was first shown on the BBC's Monitor programme. From 1945 till 1951 he lived at The Old Rectory, Farnborough, Berkshire. In 1951 he moved to the Mead in nearby Wantage, until 1971. His daughter Candida was married in the church there in May 1963.

Betjeman continued writing guidebooks and works on architecture during the 1960s and 1970s and began to broadcast. Betjeman was closely associated with the culture and spirit of Metro-land, as outer reaches of the Metropolitan Railway were known before the war. In 1967, Betjeman was considered as a candidate to be the new Poet Laureate of the United Kingdom, following the death of John Masefield. He was rejected after the Prime Minister's Appointments Secretary John Hewitt consulted with Dame Helen Gardner, the Merton Professor of English at the University of Oxford (who stated that Betjeman was "a lightweight, amusing but rather trivial" with "critical views about the establishment") and Geoffrey Handley-Taylor, chair of The Poetry Society (who stated that Betjeman "called himself a poetic hack and there was some truth to this"). Prime Minister Harold Wilson ultimately selected Cecil Day-Lewis after Hewitt recommended him over Betjeman, whom Hewitt described to Wilson as a "backward-looking choice" and "the songster of tennis lawns and cathedral cloisters".

Betjeman became Poet Laureate in 1972 following the death of Day-Lewis, the first Knight Bachelor to be appointed (the only other, Sir William Davenant, was knighted after his appointment). This role, combined with his profile from television appearances, ensured that his poetry reached a wider audience. Similarly to Tennyson, he managed to voice the thoughts and aspirations of many ordinary people while retaining the respect of many of his fellow poets. This is partly because of the apparently simple traditional metrical structures and rhymes he uses. In the early 1970s, he began a recording career of four albums on Charisma Records – Banana Blush, Late Flowering Love (both 1974), Sir John Betjeman's Britain (1977) and Varsity Rag (1981) where his poetry reading is set to music composed by Jim Parker with overdubbing by leading musicians of the time. Madeleine Dring set five of Betjeman's poems to music in 1976, just before her death. His recording catalogue extends to nine albums, four singles and two compilations.

In 1973, he made a well-regarded television documentary for the BBC called Metro-Land, directed by Edward Mirzoeff. In 1974, Betjeman and Mirzoeff followed up Metro-Land with A Passion for Churches, a celebration of Betjeman's beloved Church of England, filmed entirely in the Diocese of Norwich. In 1975, he proposed that the Fine Rooms of Somerset House should house the Turner Bequest, so helping to scupper the plan of the Minister for the Arts for a Theatre Museum to be housed there. In 1977, the BBC broadcast The Queen's Realm: A Prospect of England, an aerial anthology of English landscape, music and poetry, selected by Betjeman and produced by Edward Mirzoeff, in celebration of the Queen's Silver Jubilee.

Betjeman was fond of the ghost stories of M. R. James and supplied an introduction to Peter Haining's book M. R. James – Book of the Supernatural. He was susceptible to the supernatural; Diana Mitford recalled Betjeman staying at her country home, Biddesden House in Wiltshire, in the 1920s. She said: "he had a terrifying dream, that he was handed a card with wide black edges, and on it his name was engraved, and a date. He knew this was the date of his death".

=== Personal life and death ===
On 29 July 1933, Betjeman married the Hon. Penelope Chetwode, the daughter of Field Marshal Lord Chetwode. The couple lived in Berkshire and had a son, Paul, in 1937, and a daughter, Candida, in 1942. But in 1940 Betjeman fell in love with Joan Hunter Dunn, leading him to write a poem fantasising about them being engaged and playing tennis together in Aldershot. It was first published in 1941.

His wife Penelope converted to Catholicism in 1948. The couple drifted apart and in 1951 he met Lady Elizabeth Cavendish, with whom he developed an immediate and lifelong friendship.

Betjeman's sexuality can best be described as bisexual. His longest and best documented relationships were with women, and a fairer analysis of his sexuality may be that he was "the hatcher of a lifetime of schoolboy crushes – both gay and straight", most of which progressed no further. Nevertheless, he has been considered "temperamentally gay", and even became a penpal of Lord Alfred 'Bosie' Douglas, friend and lover of Oscar Wilde.

For the last decade of his life, Betjeman suffered increasingly from Parkinson's disease. He died at his home in Trebetherick, Cornwall, on 19 May 1984, aged 77, and is buried nearby at St Enodoc's Church.

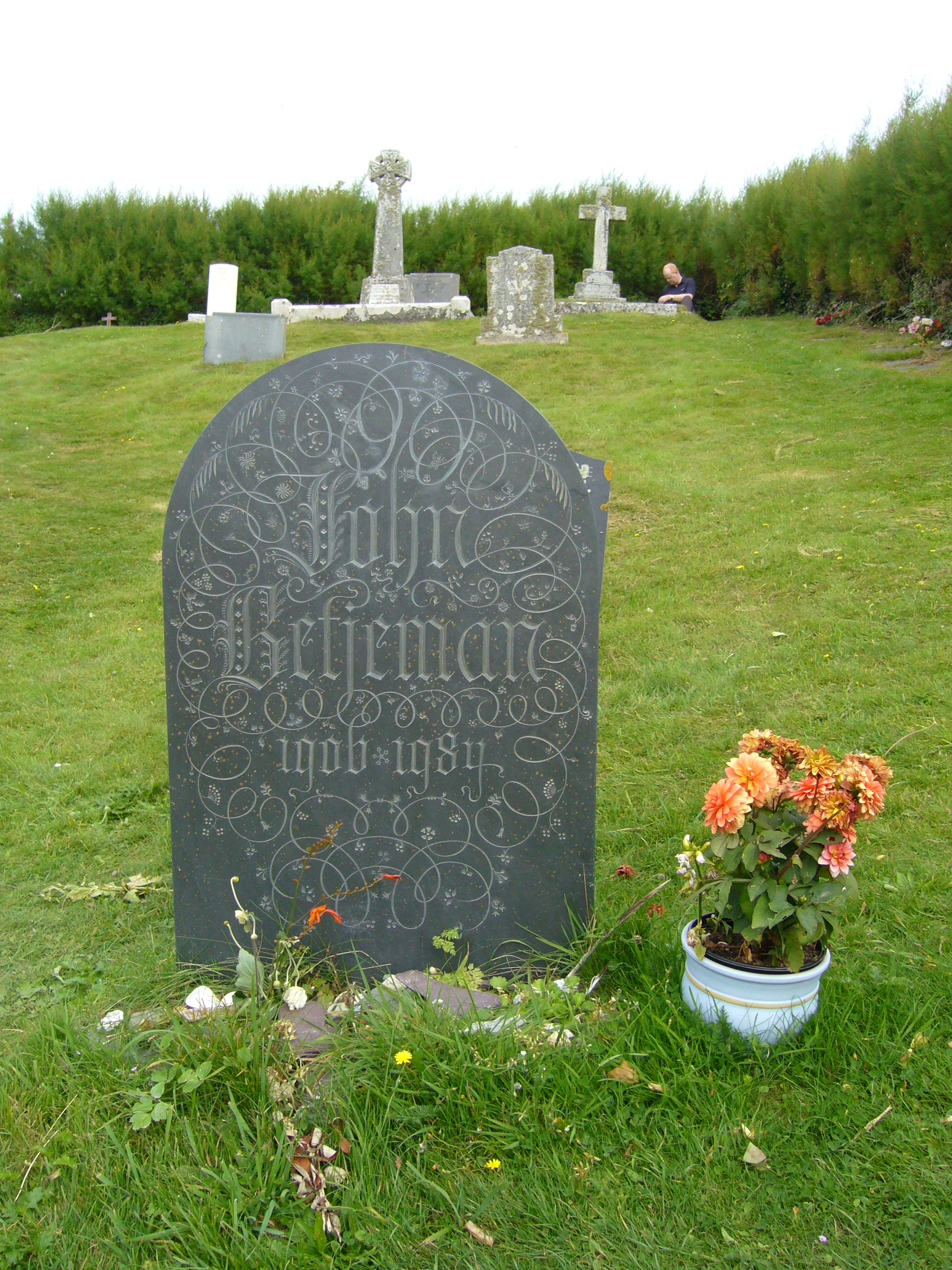
John Betjeman's gravestone by Simon Verity

Betjeman was an Anglican and his religious beliefs come through in some of his poems. In a letter written on Christmas Day 1947, he said: "Also my view of the world is that man is born to fulfil the purposes of his Creator i.e. to Praise his Creator, to stand in awe of Him and to dread Him. In this way I differ from most modern poets, who are agnostics and have an idea that Man is the centre of the Universe or is a helpless bubble blown about by uncontrolled forces." He combined piety with a nagging uncertainty about the truth of Christianity. Unlike Thomas Hardy, who disbelieved in the truth of the Christmas story while hoping it might be so, Betjeman affirms his belief even while fearing it might be false. In the poem "Christmas", one of his most openly religious pieces, the last three stanzas that proclaim the wonder of Christ's birth do so in the form of a question "And is it true...?" His views on Christianity were expressed in his poem "The Conversion of St. Paul", a response to a radio broadcast by humanist Margaret Knight:

But most of us turn slow to see
The figure hanging on a tree
And stumble on and blindly grope
Upheld by intermittent hope,
God grant before we die we all
May see the light as did St. Paul.

== Poetry ==
Betjeman's poems are often humorous, and in broadcasting he exploited his bumbling and fogeyish image. His wryly comic verse is accessible and has attracted a great following for its satirical and observant grace. Auden said in his introduction to Slick But Not Streamlined, "so at home with the provincial gaslit towns, the seaside lodgings, the bicycle, the harmonium." His poetry is similarly redolent of time and place, continually seeking out intimations of the eternal in the manifestly ordinary. There are constant evocations of the physical chaff and clutter that accumulates in everyday life, the miscellanea of an England now gone but not beyond the reach of living memory.

He talks of Ovaltine and Sturmey-Archer bicycle gears. "Oh! Fuller's angel cake, Robertson's marmalade," he writes, "Liberty lampshades, come shine on us all."

In a 1962 radio interview he told teenage questioners that he could not write about 'abstract things', preferring places, and faces. Philip Larkin wrote of his work, "how much more interesting & worth writing about Betjeman's subjects are than most other modern poets, I mean, whether so-and-so achieves some metaphysical inner unity is not really so interesting to us as the overbuilding of rural Middlesex".

Prompted by the rapid development of the Buckinghamshire (Note: Slough was in Buckinghamshire at the time, it was transferred to Berkshire in 1974) town before World War II, Betjeman wrote the ten-stanza poem "Slough" to express his dismay at the industrialisation of Britain. He later came to regret having written it. The poem was first included in his 1937 collection Continual Dew.

Come, friendly bombs, and fall on Slough!
It isn't fit for humans now,
...

== Betjeman and architecture ==
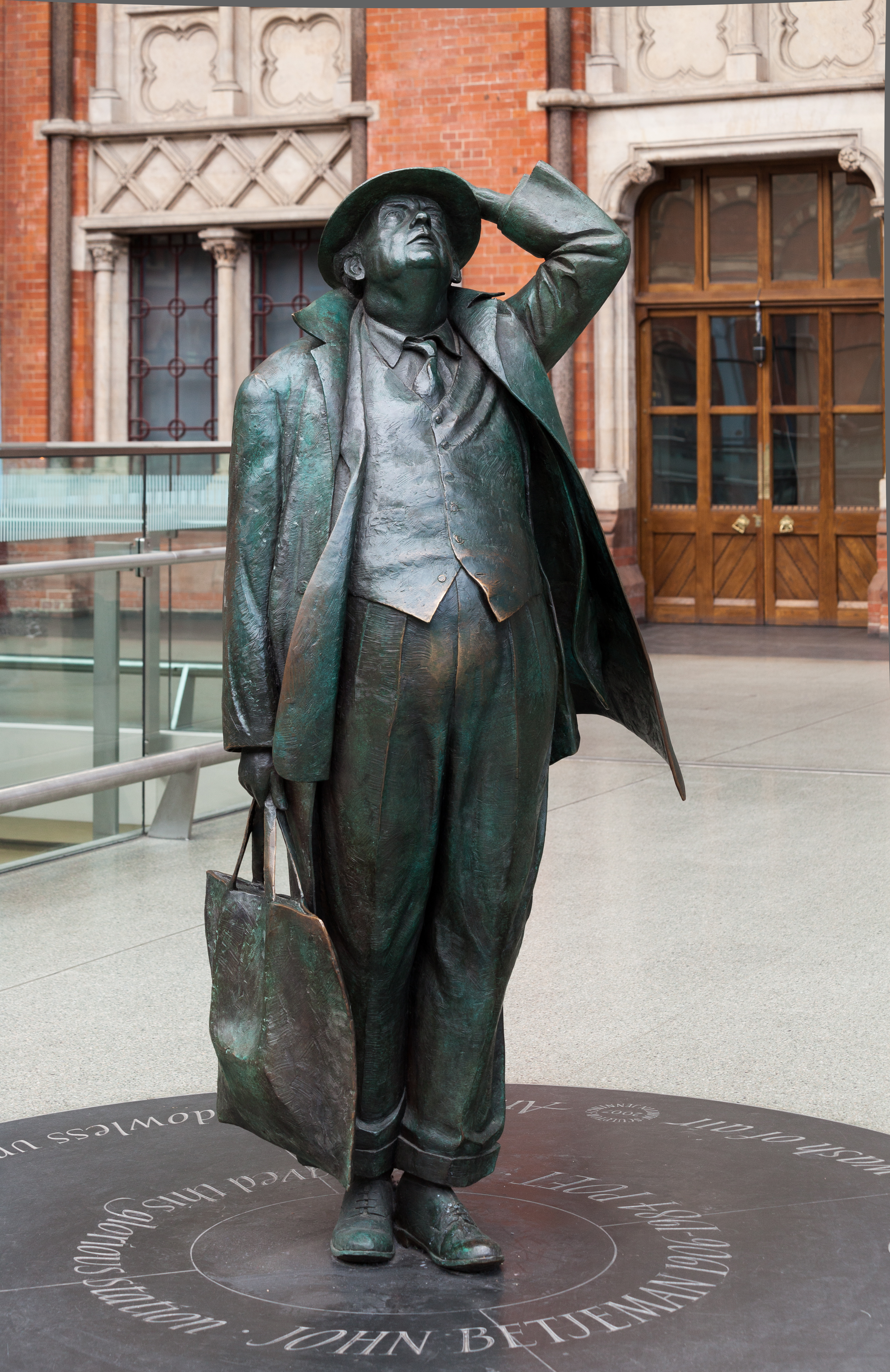
Betjeman Statue at St Pancras station

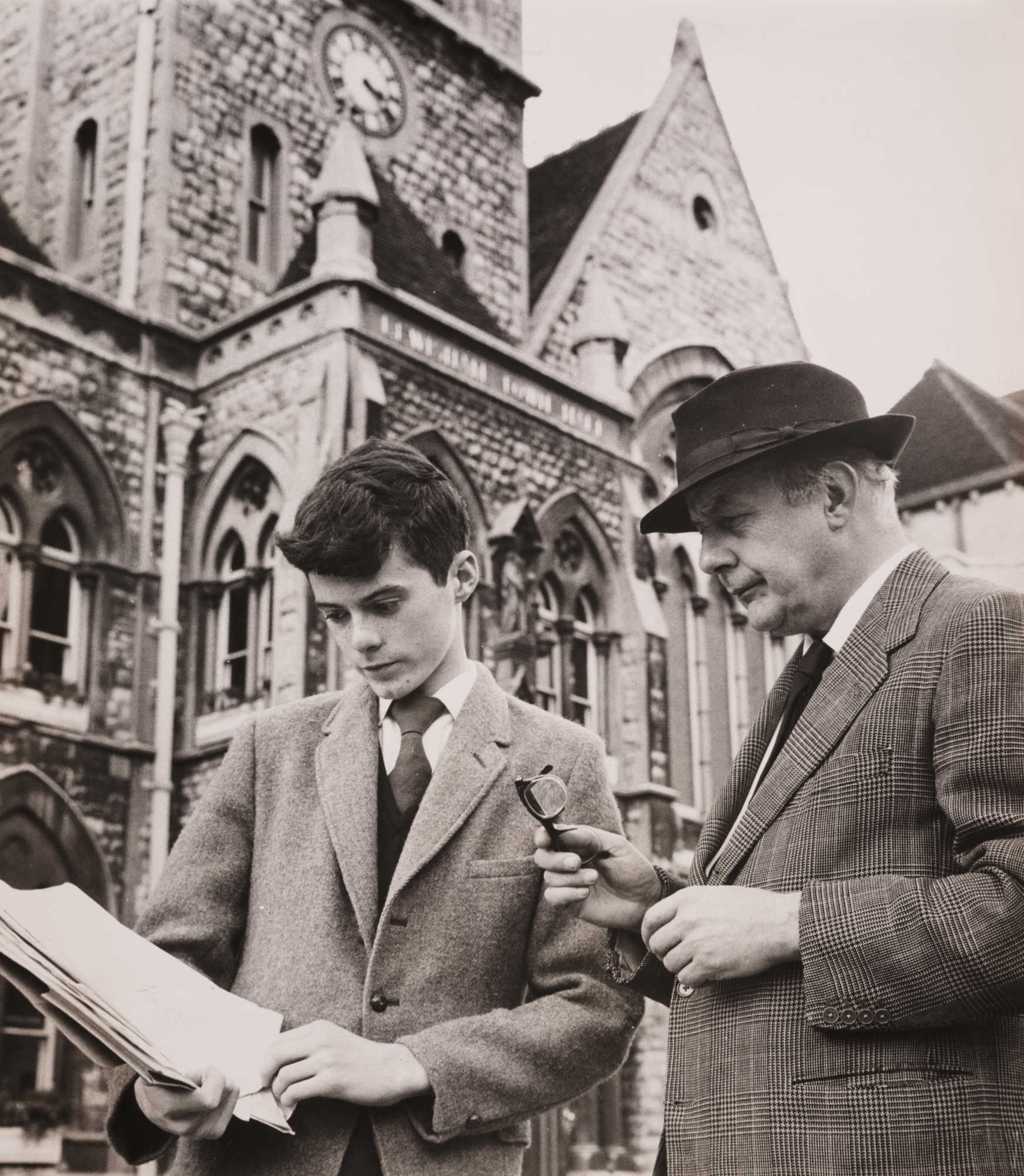
John Betjeman reads William Norton's Petition to Save Lewisham Town Hall, 1961

Betjeman had a fondness for Victorian architecture at a time when it was unfashionable, and he was a founding member of The Victorian Society. He wrote on this subject in First and Last Loves (1952) and more extensively in London's Historic Railway Stations in 1972, defending the beauty of 12 stations. He led the campaign to save Holy Trinity, Sloane Street, in London when it was threatened with demolition in the early 1970s. He was also a founding member of the Friends of Friendless Churches in 1957.

He fought a spirited but unsuccessful campaign to save the Propylaeum, known commonly as the Euston Arch, London. He is considered instrumental in helping to save St Pancras railway station, London, and was commemorated when it became an international terminus for Eurostar in November 2007. He called the plan to demolish St Pancras a "criminal folly". About it he wrote, "What [the Londoner] sees in his mind's eye is that cluster of towers and pinnacles seen from Pentonville Hill and outlined against a foggy sunset and the great arc of Barlow's train shed gaping to devour incoming engines and the sudden burst of exuberant Gothic of the hotel seen from gloomy Judd Street". On the reopening of St Pancras station in 2007, the Statue of John Betjeman was commissioned from curators Futurecity. A proposal by artist Martin Jennings was selected from a shortlist. The finished work was erected in the station at platform level, including a series of slate roundels depicting selections of Betjeman's writings.

Betjeman was given the remaining two-year lease on Victorian Gothic architect William Burges's Tower House in Holland Park after leaseholder Mrs E. R. B. Graham died in 1962. Betjeman felt he could not afford the financial implications of taking over the house permanently, with his potential liability for £10,000 of renovations upon the expiry of the lease. After damage from vandals, restoration began in 1966. Betjeman's lease included furniture from the house by Burges and Betjeman gave three pieces, the Zodiac settle, the Narcissus washstand and the Philosophy cabinet, to Evelyn Waugh.

He edited, and wrote large sections of, The Collins Guide to English Parish Churches (1958); his substantial editorial preface was described by The Times Literary Supplement as "pure gold". The classic status of this book is acknowledged by Simon Jenkins in his England's Thousand Best Churches: "Three ghosts inhabit all English churches ... They are those of John Betjeman, Alec Clifton-Taylor and Nikolaus Pevsner."

Betjeman responded to architecture as the visible manifestation of society's spiritual life as well as its political and economic structure. He attacked speculators and bureaucrats for what he saw as their rapacity and lack of imagination. In the preface of his collection of architectural essays First and Last Loves he wrote

We accept the collapse of the fabrics of our old churches, the thieving of lead and objects from them, the commandeering and butchery of our scenery by the services, the despoiling of landscaped parks and the abandonment to a fate worse than the workhouse of our country houses, because we are convinced we must save money.

In a BBC film made in 1968, but not broadcast at that time, Betjeman described the sound of Leeds to be of "Victorian buildings crashing to the ground". He went on to lambast John Poulson's British Railways House (now City House), saying how it blocked all the light out to City Square and was only a testament to money with no architectural merit. He also praised the architecture of Leeds Town Hall. In 1969, Betjeman contributed the foreword to Derek Linstrum's Historic Architecture of Leeds.

Betjeman was for over 20 years a trustee of the Bath Preservation Trust and was vice-president from 1965 to 1971, at a time when Bath—a city rich in Georgian architecture—was coming under increasing pressure from modern developers and a road had been proposed to cut across it. He also created a short television documentary, Architecture of Bath, in which he voiced his concerns about the way the city's architectural heritage was being mistreated. From 1946 to 1948, he had served as Secretary to the Oxford Preservation Trust. Betjeman was also instrumental in saving the Duke of Cornwall Hotel in Plymouth.

== Legacy ==
=== Prizes ===
The Society for the Protection of Ancient Buildings annually presents a John Betjeman award to recognise the repair and conservation of places of worship in England and Wales.

The John Betjeman Poetry Competition for Young People began in 2006 and was open to 10- to 13-year-olds living anywhere in the British Isles (including the Republic of Ireland), with a first prize of £1,000. In addition to prizes for individual finalists, state schools who enter pupils may win one of six one-day poetry workshops. In 2020, Private Eye reported that the prize was to close after thirteen years.

=== Other memorials ===
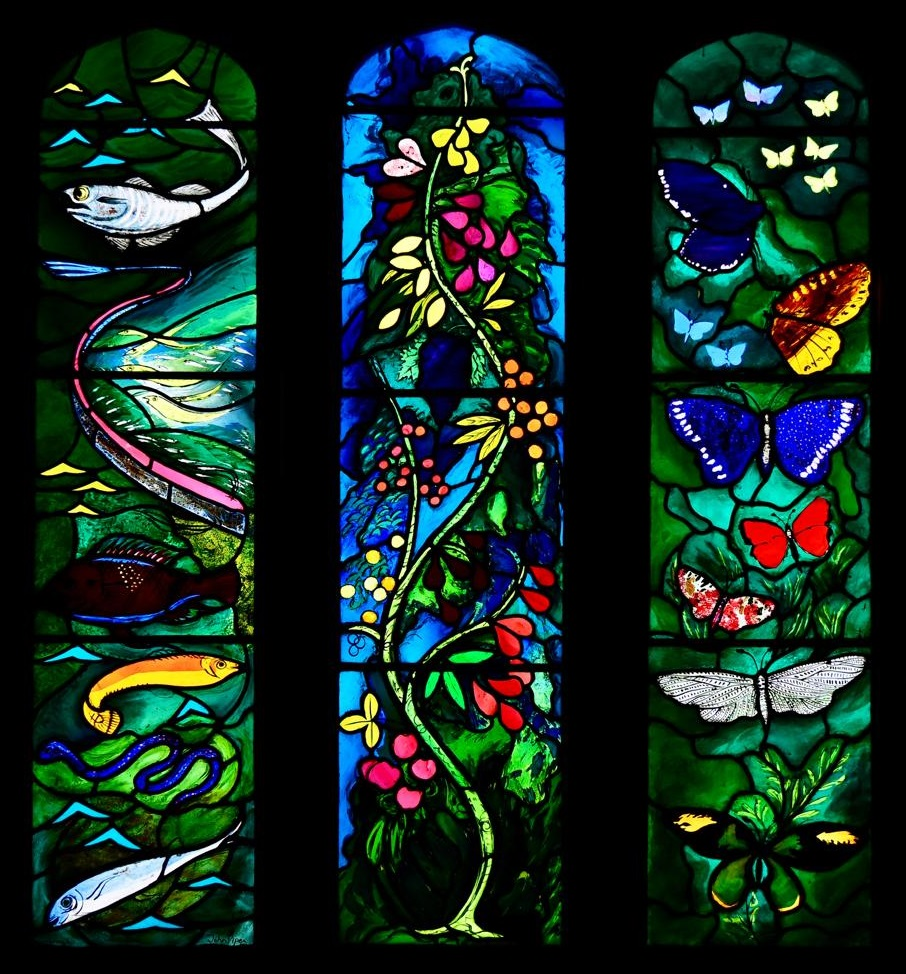
Memorial window at All Saints Church, Farnborough, by John Piper

- A 1986 memorial window, Symbols of the Resurrection, in All Saints Church, Farnborough, where Betjeman lived in the nearby Rectory between 1945 and 1951. Commissioned by the Friends of Friendless Churches, it was designed by John Piper and manufactured by Joseph A. Nuttgens. Piper and Betjeman collaborated on the Shell Guides series of guidebooks.

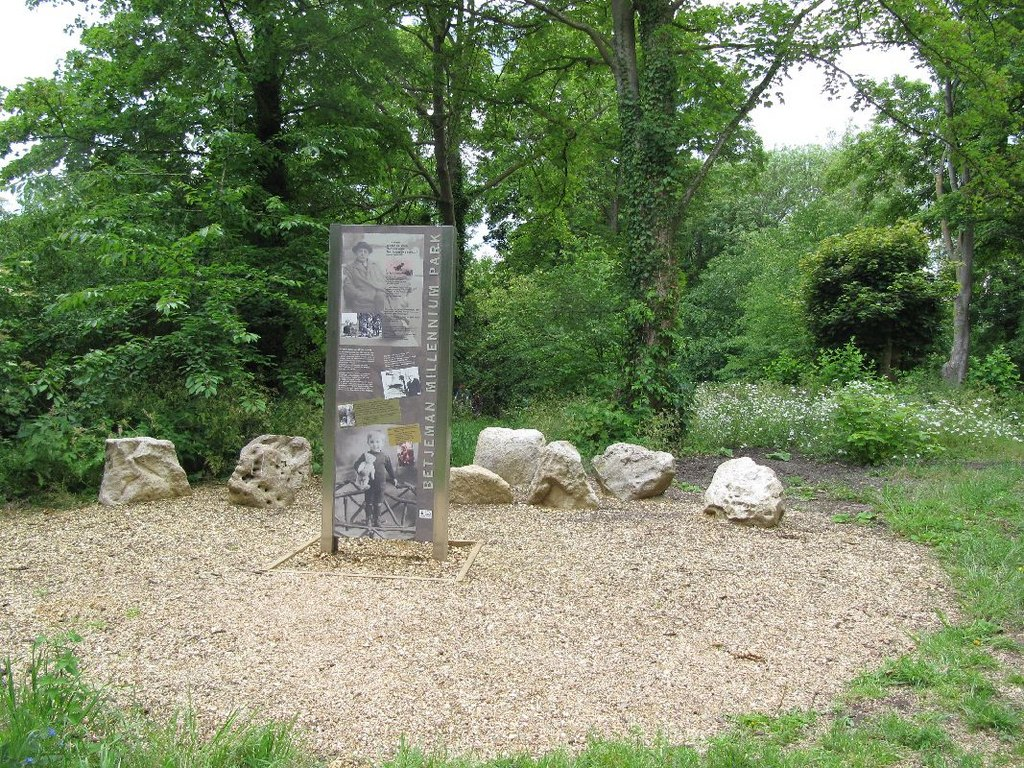
Betjeman Millennium Park

- The Betjeman Millennium Park at Wantage in Oxfordshire, where he lived from 1951 to 1972 and where he set his book Archie and the Strict Baptists
- One of the roads in Pinner, a town covered in Betjeman's film Metro-Land is called Betjeman Close, while another in Chorleywood, also covered in Metro-Land, is called Betjeman Gardens.
- A road in the Sheffield suburb of Broomhill is called Betjeman Gardens. The suburb was described by Betjeman as "the prettiest suburb in England" and was the subject of his poem "An Edwardian Sunday, Broomhill, Sheffield".
- One of the trains on the pier railway at Southend-on-Sea is named Sir John Betjeman (the other Sir William Heygate). This train has since been retired upon being replaced by a new electric train in 2021.
- A British Rail Class 86 AC electric locomotive, 86229, was named Sir John Betjeman by the man in person at St Pancras station on 24 June 1983, just before his death; it was renamed Lions Group International in 1998 and was scrapped in February 2020. The nameplate was also carried by Class 90 locomotive 90007.
- In 2003, to mark their centenary, the residents of Lissenden Gardens in north London put up a blue plaque to mark Betjeman's birthplace.
- In 2006, a blue plaque was installed on Betjeman's childhood home, 31 West Hill, Highgate, London N6.
- In 2006, a blue plaque was erected at Garrard's Farm, Uffington, Oxfordshire, which had been his first married home.
- A blue plaque has been erected at 43 Cloth Fair, opposite St Bartholomew-the-Great church and near St Bartholomew's Hospital, where he lived and worked. He let the ground floor to Leonard Beddall-Smith, the conservation architect and Georgian specialist, who was the founder architect of the Landmark Trust, who now own the building to celebrate Betjeman's time there.
- The statue of John Betjeman at St Pancras station in London by sculptor Martin Jennings was unveiled in 2007.
- On the centenary of Betjeman's birth in 2006, his daughter led two celebratory railway trips: from London to Bristol, and through Metro-land, to Quainton Road.
- In 2014, a new street in Cleobury Mortimer, Shropshire, was named 'Betjeman Way', in honour of the poet, and in recognition of the fact that the restoration of Cleobury Mortimer's church steeple won SPAB's John Betjeman award in 1994.
- On 1 September 2014, Betjeman was the subject of the hour-long BBC Four documentary Return to Betjemanland, presented by his biographer A. N. Wilson. At the start of the broadcast, there was a spoken tribute to Betjeman's daughter Candida Lycett Green, who had died just twelve days earlier on 19 August, aged 71.

A bust of Betjeman in Wantage

- On 28 August 2016, a bust of Betjeman based on the St Pancras statue was unveiled outside the Vale and Downland Museum in Wantage, Oxfordshire.
- On 10 June 2017, a plaque was unveiled at the Dragon School, Oxford, to mark the centenary of his arrival there on 2 May 1917.

== Awards and honours ==
- 1960 Queen's Medal for Poetry
- 1960 Appointed Commander of the Order of the British Empire in the 1960 New Year Honours.
- 1968 Companion of Literature, the Royal Society of Literature
- 1969 Appointed Knight Bachelor in the 1969 Birthday Honours.
- 1972 Poet Laureate of the United Kingdom
- 1973 Honorary Member, the American Academy of Arts and Letters
- 2011 Honoured by the University of Oxford, his alma mater, as one of its 100 most distinguished members from ten centuries.

== Works ==
Some works include:

- Mount Zion. 1932.
- Continual Dew: a Little Book of Bourgeois Verse, John Murray. 1937.
- An Oxford University Chest. 1938.
- Old Lights for New Chancels: Verses Topographical and Amatory. John Murray. 1940.
- English Cities and Small Towns. William Collins. 1943.
- New Bats in Old Belfries. 1945.
- Shropshire: A Shell Guide. Faber & Faber. 1951.
- A Few Late Chrysanthemums. 1954.
- Poems in the Porch. 1954.
- Noblesse Oblige (co-author). 1956.
- The Collins Guide to English Parish Churches (editor). 1958.
- Summoned by Bells. John Murray. 1960.
- High and Low. 1966.
- London's Historic Railway Stations. John Murray. 1972. ISBN 978-0-7195-3426-3.
- A Nip in the Air, 1974.
- John Betjeman: coming home: an anthology of his prose 1920–1977. Methuen. 1997. ISBN 9780413717108.
- Betjeman's Best British Churches. HarperCollins Publishers. 2011. ISBN 978-0-00-741688-2.

== Partial filmography ==
Year	Title	Notes
1959	Monitor	A Poet in London
1959	Journey into the Weald of Kent	Short film
1960	Monitor	Journey into a Lost World
1962	In View	Men of Steam
1962	John Betjeman Goes by Train: King's Lynn to Hunstanton	Short film
1962	Let's Imagine	Childhood in the Country
1962-3	Betjeman's West Country	9 episodes
1963	Let's Imagine	A Branch Line Railway
1964	Discovering Britain with John Betjeman	Short film series (10 films)
1965	Bristol My Home	TV film
1967	Betjeman's London	6 episodes
1967	The Picture Theatre	TV film
1968	Contrasts	Marble Arch to Edgware
1968	A Poet Goes North	TV film
1968	Summer 67	The Isle of Wight in August
1969	Bird's Eye View	Beside the Seaside
1969	Bird's Eye View	An Englishman's Home
1970	Railway's Forever	Short film
1970	Four with Betjeman: Victorian Architects and Architecture	4 episodes
1971	Bird's Eye View	A Land of all Seasons
1972	Thank God It's Sunday	Short film
1973	Metro-land	TV documentary film
1974	A Passion For Churches	TV documentary film
1976	Summoned By Bells	TV film
