= Candida Lycett Green =

British author (1942–2014)

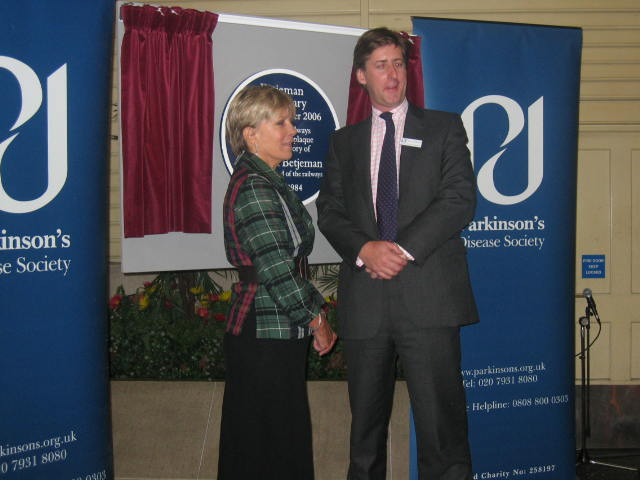
- Candida Lycett Green (left) unveiling a plaque commemorating her father, John Betjeman, at Marylebone Station in 2006
- Born: Candida Rose Betjeman; 22 September 1942; Dublin, Ireland
- Died: 19 August 2014 (aged 71); England
- Occupation: Writer
- Spouse: Rupert Lycett Green (m. 1963)
- Children: 5
- Relatives: Sir John Betjeman (father); Penelope Chetwode (mother)

Candida Rose Lycett Green (née Betjeman; 22 September 1942 – 19 August 2014) was a British author who wrote sixteen books including English Cottages, Goodbye London, The Perfect English House, Over the Hills and Far Away and The Dangerous Edge of Things. Her television documentaries included The Englishwoman and the Horse, and The Front Garden. Unwrecked England, based on a regular column of the same name she wrote for The Oldie from 1992, was published in 2009.

Green has been described as "the finest writer of our time on the English countryside". She edited and introduced the letters and prose of her father John Betjeman which were published in three volumes. She was a commissioner of English Heritage for nine years and her proudest achievement was the role she played in the regeneration of Chatterley Whitfield Colliery, Stoke-On-Trent.

She was a member of the Performing Rights Society through her writing of lyrics for songs and was a Contributing Editor to Vogue from 1987. She was part of the original team who started Private Eye. Nicky Haslam nominated Lycett Green as the living person he most admired ("beautiful, brave, strong, clever, loving and loved").

== Early years ==
Candida Rose Betjeman was born on 22 September 1942 in Dublin where her father, John Betjeman was wartime press attaché at the British Embassy. Irish poet Patrick Kavanagh, a friend of her father, celebrated her birth with a poem "Candida". Her mother, the Hon. Penelope Valentine Hester Betjeman (née Chetwode; 1910–1986), was the daughter of Field-Marshal Sir Philip Chetwode (later Lord Chetwode) (1869–1950). Her paternal grandparents, Ernest and Mabel ("Bess") Betjemann (her father dispensed with the second "n"), died in 1934 and 1951 respectively.

In 2007, Lycett Green attributed to Ernest Betjemann, said by her father to be a hater of verse, a poem found in the log book of a yacht he had sailed on the Norfolk Broads in the 1920s. She regretted not asking her father more about his parents: "but it's not vital when you're young". An elder brother, Paul, had been born in 1937. The Betjemans returned to England in 1943, moving from Uffington to Farnborough in 1945, and then to Wantage in 1951.

=== Education ===
Known to her parents as "Wibz", Candida was educated at St Mary's, Wantage. In her teens she rode ponies competitively; on one occasion, her father, having spelt out his surname for the purpose of sending a telegram, was asked by a local telephonist if he were "any relation of the little girl who wins all the prizes at the horse shows". She took a course in sculpture at a technical college in Oxford. There she met John Wells and Richard Ingrams, then undergraduates at Oxford University, who, shortly afterwards, founded the satirical magazine Private Eye, to which she became a regular contributor.

Ingrams, who had gone up to Oxford after National Service, was disappointed to find that it was (as he put it) "just a lot of men in duffel coats wandering up and down the High Street", while another Eye journalist Paul Foot, not known for hyperbole, described Candida as "the most beautiful woman in Oxford".

== Marriage and family ==
On 25 May 1963, Candida Betjeman married Rupert Lycett Green, a rising figure in the tailoring business, whose shop Blades opened first in Dover Street, London and later in Savile Row. His particular kind of entrepreneurship was said at the time to "typify the revolt of the upper class young". The couple had five children, including Imogen who married Augustus Christie, director of the Glyndebourne Opera. The couple became friends of the then Prince of Wales.

== 1960s ==
During the "swinging" sixties, the Lycett Green family was associated with members of London’s "in" crowd, Blades being frequented by many names of the period, including the Beatles, actor Terence Stamp and John Aspinall, founder of the Clermont Club. In 1967, she wrote a poem called the Knightsbridge Ballade that was evocative of the period. In this, the subject (aged 18 as opposed to the poet’s 25) declared that she was "frightfully keen" on Terence Stamp and wished she had a bigger bust: "Though Mummy says it's frightfully smart/And any more would beckon lust".

== Journalism and writing ==
Lycett Green edited two volumes of her father’s letters (1994–95) and an anthology of his prose, Coming Home (1997). In the second volume of letters, she described herself as a hoarder of correspondence (unlike her brother) and referred to her late father (with her husband) as her best friend. Lycett Green contributed to magazines such as Queen (from which she was dismissed because of her association with Private Eye), Vogue, Country Life and The Oldie.

Lycett Green shared some of her father's campaigning zeal, as regards, in particular, the perceived erosion of England's fabric. They both found an outlet in the "Nooks and Corners" column in Private Eye (to which Betjeman was the first contributor in 1971) and she later contributed to "Unwrecked England" in The Oldie (founded by Ingrams).

In an article in Country Life in 2003, Lycett Green identified several aspects of English life which had become "universal fixtures in our mind's eye": cricket on the village green, Trooping the Colour, bands playing in a town park, the Women's Institute singing Jerusalem, pearly kings and queens at the Lord Mayor's Show and discussions about the weather over a pint of beer in the local pub. In her autobiography, Over the Hills and Far Away, she writes about her experiences with cancer.

== Betjeman centenary (2006) ==
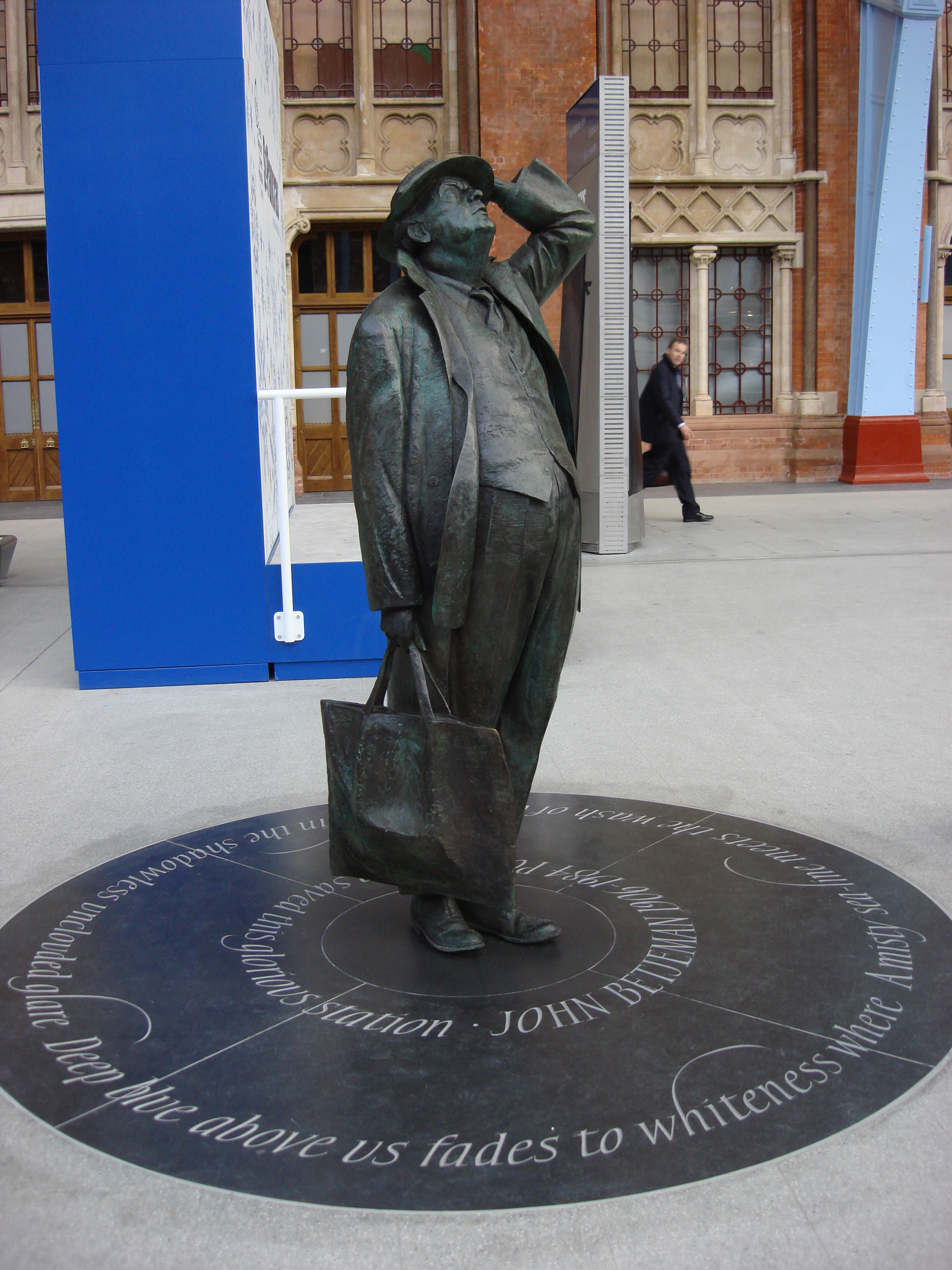
Statue of John Betjeman at St Pancras railway station

In 2006, Lycett Green organised various events to mark the centenary of her father’s birth. These included a gala at the Prince of Wales Theatre in London and a jamboree in Cornwall for eight thousand people.

There were excursions by train from London to Bristol and, through "Metro-land", to Quainton Road; Lycett Green unveiled a commemorative plaque at Marylebone station to mark Betjeman's fond association with the railways. Presenting the Mayor of Slough, with a book of her father's poems, she made clear that he had regretted his mildly notorious poem of 1937:

Come, friendly bombs, and fall on Slough
It isn't fit for humans now.

Lycett Green wrote about the organisation of these various events, noting the intricacies of the rail schedules ("How long will the train stop at Ruislip so that [the poem] Middlesex can be read over the tannoy?") and being followed around Cornwall by a television crew ("I have had a microphone down my bra for almost two days now").

In 2007, Lycett Green was a member of "an alarmingly grown up" panel of judges to select a sculptor (Martin Jennings) for the Statue of John Betjeman that was erected on the concourse of the redeveloped London St Pancras station.

== Death ==
Candida Lycett Green died at the age of 71 on 19 August 2014 from pancreatic cancer. She was survived by her husband Rupert and their five children.

== List of works ==
- The Adventure of Hadrian Hedgehog, illustrated by Christopher Thynne (Collins, 1968)
- Hadrian in the Orient, illustrated by Christopher Thynne (Collins, 1969)
- Goodbye London: An Illustrated Guide to Threatened Buildings, co-authored with Christopher Booker (HarperCollins, 1973) ISBN 9780006332169
- English Cottages, co-authored with Tony Evans (Weidenfeld & Nicolson, 1982) ISBN 9780297781165
- Brilliant Gardens: A Celebration of English Gardening, photographs by Andrew Lawson (Chatto & Windus, 1989) ISBN 9780701132682
- The Perfect English Country House, photographs by Christopher Simon-Sykes (Pavilion, 1991) ISBN 9781851455515
- John Betjeman: Letters, Volume One. 1926 to 1951, editor (Methuen, 1994) ISBN 9780413669506
- John Betjeman: Letters, Volume Two. 1952-1984, editor (Methuen, 1995) ISBN 9780413669407
- England: Travels Through an Unwrecked Landscape (Pavilion, 1996) ISBN 9781857939217
- John Betjeman: Coming Home. An Anthology of His Prose, editor (Methuen, 1997) ISBN 9780413717108
- Betjeman's Britain (The Folio Society, 1999)
- Country Life: 100 Favourite Houses (Boxtree, 1999) ISBN 9780752213330
- The Garden at Highgrove, co-authored with H.R.H. The Prince of Wales (Weidenfeld & Nicolson, 2000) ISBN 9780297825449
- Over the Hills and Far Away (Doubleday, 2002) ISBN 9780385603317
- The Dangerous Edge of Things: A Village Childhood (Doubleday, 2005) ISBN 9780385606776
- First and Last Loves: John Betjeman and Architecture (Sir John Soane's Museum, 2006) ISBN 9780954904142
- Unwrecked England (Oldie Publications, 2010) ISBN 9781901170146
- Seaside Resorts (Oldie Publications, 2011) ISBN 9781901170177
