= List of works in stained glass by John Piper =

This is a list of works in stained glass designed by the English artist John Piper between 1954 and 1985, the majority realised in partnership with glassmaker Patrick Reyntiens.

== Background ==
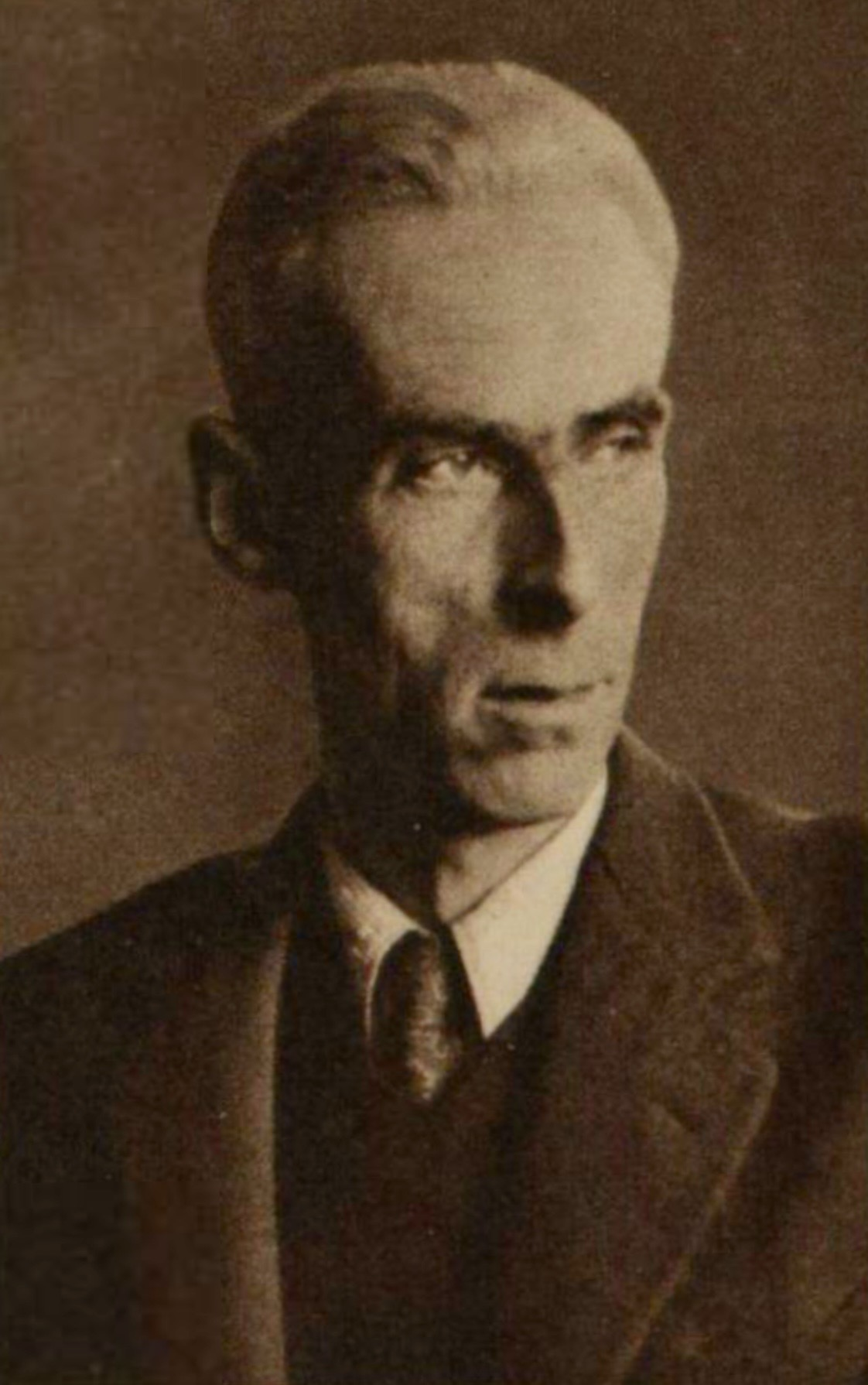
John Piper in 1954

Already an established artist working primarily in the medium of painting and printmaking, Piper only began designing for stained glass in the 1950s when he was aged over 50 years old. It would become a major, though far from exclusive, avenue of artistic expression during the second half of Piper's career.

From the outset, Piper forged a productive professional relationship with the glassmaker Patrick Reyntiens, who realised the large majority of Piper's completed designs for glass. Despite Piper being more than 20 years' older than Reyntiens, and by far the more established artist, in general this was a reciprocal and collaborative partnership. Though always structured by Piper’s origination of an overall design, they resisted a hierarchical model of artist above craftsman in favour of interdependent creative exchange. This allowed Reyntiens significant interpretative agency, which was particularly true for large-scale and experimental commissions, such as the Crown of Glass for Liverpool Metropolitan Cathedral.

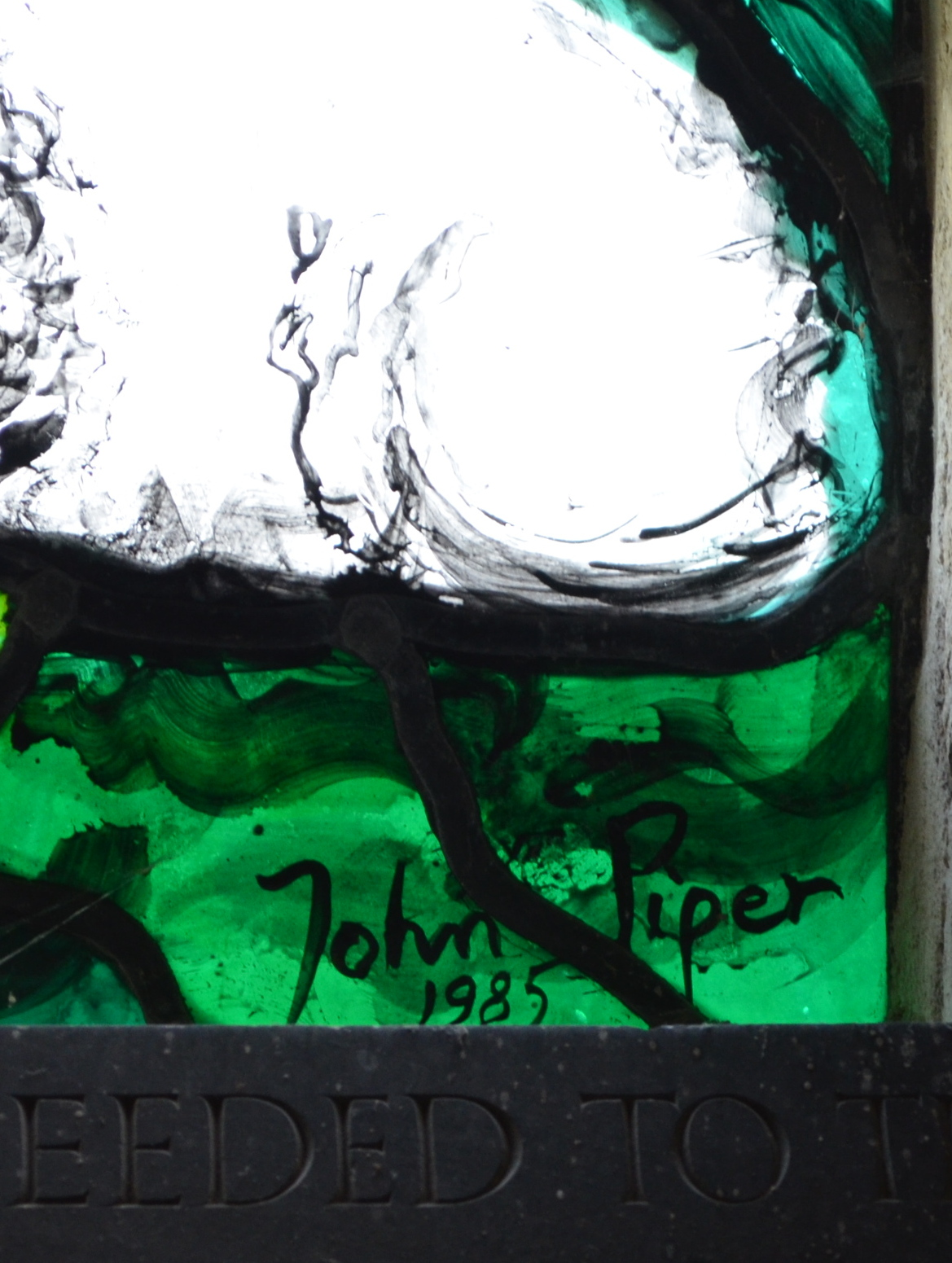
John Piper's signature as seen on his window for St Peter's Church, Firle

Together, Piper and Reyntiens completed over 60 individual stained glass commissions over a period of more than 30 years, their reputation forged early, particularly after the contemporary critical praise afforded to the baptistry window at Coventry Cathedral. Commissions were primarily - though not exclusively - intended for religious settings, benefiting from widespread reconstruction efforts following the Second World War. Piper designed in both figurative and abstract styles interchangeably throughout his career according to the individual commission and the brief from the client. Nevertheless, his works in stained glass - and his artistic practice more generally - are united by their modern painterly style.

Piper set out his ‘philosophy’ on the medium in his 1968 essay Stained Glass: Art or Anti-Art?, reflecting on the uneasy position that stained glass occupies between fine art and architectural craft. In it he questioned whether modern trends risked stripping the medium of its expressive depth. He critiqued both nostalgic imitation of historical styles and overly abstract experimentation, arguing that either could disconnect stained glass from its essential dialogue with light, space, and setting. Ultimately, Piper advocated for a balanced, context-sensitive approach in which contemporary design is rooted in the medium’s unique and timeless qualities while still embracing innovation.

In the same essay Piper also emphasised the importance of maintaining a clear separation between the artist-designer and the craftsman-manufacturer, seeing this distinction as vital to preserving both creative integrity and technical excellence in modern stained glass practice. This conception of creative division can certainly be read as an endorsement of the particular nature of Piper’s own collaborative partnership with Reyntiens. It has also been read as a strategically performative piece of reputational positioning in relation to his contemporaries working in the medium, most of whom practiced as both designer and maker, such as John Hayward, Keith New and Harry Stammers.

== List of works in stained glass ==
The following list is taken primarily from June Osborne's 1997 book John Piper and Stained Glass, considered the definitive text on the subject.All of the locations listed below are in England except where otherwise stated. Piper completed only two stained glass commissions for settings outside the United Kingdom (in the United States and New Zealand).

| Title / Image | Date | Location (sortable by English county) | Maker |
|---|---|---|---|
| Two Kings | 1954 | River and Rowing Museum, Henley-on-Thames, Oxfordshire | Patrick Reyntiens |
| | Description: Rectangular panel depicting heads of two kings, made by Reyntiens based on watercolour painting provided by Piper and inspired by glass seen at Chartres Cathedral and Bourges Cathedral. Notes: Trial piece made by Reyntiens ahead of Piper accepting Oundle commission, its success sparking 30-year partnership between designer and maker. | | |
| Christ in Nine Forms | 1954–56 | Chapel of St Anthony, Oundle School, Oundle, Northamptonshire | Patrick Reyntiens |
| | Description: Across three windows and nine lights, Christ is shown in nine forms, from left to right: The Way, Truth and Life; The True Vine, Bread and Water; The Judge, Teacher and Shepherd. Notes: Three triple-light windows with corresponding tracery in eastern apse wall. Piper's first completed public commission in stained glass. Commissioned by The Worshipful Company of Grocers, who patronage dates back to the school's founding, for the 400th anniversary of the school. | | |
| Christ flanked by Saints | 1955–60 | Victoria & Albert Museum, London | Patrick Reyntiens |
| | Description: Semi-abstract representation of Christ seated and in long robes flanked by St Peter and St Paul. Notes: In style of windows for Oundle School and Llandaff Cathedral, but seemingly unrelated to either. Purchased by the Victoria and Albert Museum in 1981 from John Piper. | | |
| Abstract composition | 1956 | Stained Glass Museum, Ely Cathedral, Ely, Cambridgeshire | Patrick Reyntiens |
| | Description: Abstract panel of mainly rectangular pieces of glass in variety of colours. Notes: Experimental panel designed and manufactured as part of Coventry Cathedral commission. On long-term loan to the Stained Glass Museum since 2003. | | |
| Instruments of the Crucifixion | 1957–62 | Minster Church of St Andrew, Plymouth, Devon | Patrick Reyntiens |
| | Description: Multicoloured five-light window with corresponding tracery above, depicting the Instruments of the Crucifixion, most prominently the ladder used for the Deposition, crossed against the Holy Lance and Holy Sponge set on its reed. Notes: Situated under west tower, dedicated to the memory of Waldorf Astor, 2nd Viscount Astor. The first of six individually designed windows for church. | | |
| Baptistry Window | 1958–62 | Coventry Cathedral, Coventry, West Midlands | Patrick Reyntiens |
| | Description: Monumental and complex 21.9m high, 18m wide floor-to-ceiling window comprising 198 multicoloured lights set into a convex concrete chequerboard frame designed by Cathedral architect, Basil Spence. Though each pane is unique and abstract, they combine to provide the impression of a dazzling yellow sunburst to the centre. The primarily blue glass above and green below are reminiscent of sunrise, an appropriate metaphor for its setting in the Cathedral baptistry. Notes: Baptistry Window to south east of Cathedral, commissioned by the Coventry Cathedral Reconstruction Committee in 1955. Piper and Reyntiens concluded that, to create unity, dazzling colour and an abstract pattern was required. Piper produced individual mixed media designs for all 198 lights, each one numbered according to its intended position, between 1958 and 1960. The stained glass was made over three years with installation starting in May 1961. It is widely considered the masterpiece of both Piper and Reyntiens. | | |
| Miracles of Jesus | 1959–64 | Chapel of Eton College, Eton, Berkshire | Patrick Reyntiens |
| | Description: Eight windows of ten lights each, five upper and five lower, plus corresponding tracery. Four figurative depictions of the Miracles of Jesus depicted in north windows successively show the Miraculous Draft of Fishes, the Feeding of Five Thousand, the Stilling of the Waters, and the Raising of Lazarus. Four Parables of Jesus are depicted on south side successively showing the Light under a Bushel, the House built on Rock, the Lost Sheep, and the Sower. Notes: Piper's unified scheme of eight windows fill all four bays on both sides of nave. They are designed to be in dialogue with Evie Hone's huge Crucifixion window in the east wall, installed in 1952, Hone's death in 1953 prevented her from completing the entire glazing scheme. | | |
| Sanderson Hotel screen | 1959–60 | Sanderson Hotel, London | Patrick Reyntiens |
| | Description: Rectangular Abstract composition with multicoloured biometric forms, measuring 9.75m x 6.4m. Notes: Built in the 1950s as the headquarters of the decorative interior design company Arthur Sanderson & Sons, since converted into a hotel. Piper's glazing fills back wall of central staircase on ground floor, backlit and hung to disguise the lift shafts. | | |
| Evangelists and Antecedents | 1960–61 | All Hallows Church, Wellingborough, Northamptonshire | Patrick Reyntiens |
| | Description: Four-light window with corresponding tracery above, filled with figurative symbols of the Four Evangelists above and their Old Testament antecedents below. From left to right, Matthew and Moses, Mark and Judah, Luke and Aaron, and John and Elijah. Notes: Located at west end of north aisle, window dedicated to Helen Wells Chapman. First of three individual commissions Piper and Reyntiens completed for church. | | |
| Flackwell Heath rose | 1961 | Christ Church, Flackwell Heath, Buckinghamshire | Patrick Reyntiens |
| | Description: Rose window with fifteen individual panels of glass, each abstract, multicoloured and fragmentary, seemingly bearing little relation to seven-petal rose outlined in the tracery. Notes: Rose window in west wall of nave. While Reyntiens is certainly the manufacturer, there is some debate as to whether the design is by Piper or is from Reyntiens' own hand. Church claims it is by Piper, but it is absent from June Osborne's 1997 catalogue. | | |
| Five Wounds of Christ | 1961 | Chapel of Nuffield College, Oxford, Oxford, Oxfordshire | Patrick Reyntiens |
| | Description: Three-light window in north wall depicts the Five Wounds of Christ, with the feet, hands and heart isolated, drawn in outline with the only colour being the gashes of blood. At either end of the Chapel are opposing recesses in the east and west walls, four in total, each with a two-light window with an abstract design. Those towards the north are more vivid, while, those towards the south are in paler hues. Notes: Brutalist chapel built 1959–61, commissioned from architect Thomas Barnes as part of wider college campus. Piper also provided designs for the chapel furniture. | | |
| Abstract composition | 1961–62 | Victoria & Albert Museum, London | Patrick Reyntiens |
| | Description: Panel of stained glass in shades of blue and turquoise painted in black with an abstract design. Notes: Made for Baptistry Window at Coventry Cathedral, but never installed. Donated to the Victoria and Albert Museum in 1976 by Lord Beaumont of Witley. | | |
| Supper at Emmaus | 1961–62 | Llandaff Cathedral, Cardiff, Wales | Patrick Reyntiens |
| | Description: Three light window with corresponding tracery above, depicting the Supper at Emmaus. Christ is seen seated in centre light, flanked by two disciples to left and right. Upper panel in tracery depicts Jesus' walk to Emmaus. Set in wall directly above is a roundel with quatrefoils filled with glass abstractions, part of the same commission. Notes: Commission comprises two windows set one over the other above the chancel arch. Commissioned to replace Victorian glass blown out during Second World War. | | |
| Four Elements | 1963 | Minster Church of St Andrew, Plymouth, Devon | Patrick Reyntiens |
| | Description: Six-light window with corresponding tracery above. Semi-abstracted representations of the four elements are shown horizontally across all six lights. From bottom to top, water is shown as a green ocean with coloured waves, earth is shown as a collection of rocks on yellow background, the red and white flames of fire climb above into tracery, while air is represented by the blue that climbs to either side. Notes: East chancel window, memorial to Nancy Astor, Viscountess Astor. One of six individually designed windows for church. | | |
| All Hallows rose | 1963 | All Hallows Church, Wellingborough, Northamptonshire | Patrick Reyntiens |
| | Description: Six-petal rose window containing 13 individual panes of glass that collectively form red and yellow star composition on blue background. Notes: Rose window under west tower. Second of three individual commissions Piper and Reyntiens completed for church. | | |
| Flames of Resurrection | 1963–64 | St Mark's Church, Broomhill, Sheffield | Patrick Reyntiens |
| | Description: 38 individual lights set into thick-panelled concrete frame of irregular five-sided window, together forming unified abstract design on blue background with streaks of yellow, orange and red flame representing both the resurrection of Christ and the church itself. Notes: George Pace's modernist church was constructed from ruins of bombed-out predecessor, 1958–1963. Piper's west window is complemented by Harry Stammers' Te Deum window to east. | | |
| Newport roundel | 1964 | Newport Cathedral, Newport, Wales | Patrick Reyntiens |
| | Description: Large roundel with tracery in the form of a double cross, filled with glass in an abstract design of golds and yellows, enhanced by Reyntiens' use of silver stain detailing. Notes: Window is into the east wall of the sanctuary at the top of a large painted dossal, also designed by Piper as part of the same commission. The dossal, designed to look like marble, was painted on canvas by Peter Courtier, the senior scenery maker at the Royal Opera House . | | |
| Twelve Foliate Heads | 1964 | Wessex Hotel, Winchester, Hampshire | Patrick Reyntiens |
| | Description: Twelve backlit square panels each depicting a foliate head on a theme of the Green Man. U-shaped vegetation cradles each head. Notes: Glass screen commissioned for, and installed in, the foyer of the Wessex Hotel in Winchester. Each of the heads may represent one of the twelve months of the year. | | |
| Tree of Life | 1964 | Old Chapel, Ripon College, Cuddesdon, Oxfordshire | Patrick Reyntiens |
| | Description: Trapezoidal window made from three triangular panes of glass that combine to form red Tree of Life on blue background, surrounded by semi-circle of yellow dots. Notes: Perhaps Piper's most discreet commission, the comparatively small window is inserted high above the west gallery. Piper's first Tree of Life in glass, which would become a recurring theme. | | |
| Brittany Beach | 1965 | Victoria & Albert Museum, London | Patrick Reyntiens |
| | Description: Semi-abstract beach scene with large red and white shapes to centre, possibly representing a boat on its side, set against a dark green background with yellow and blue undulating lines above and below. Notes: Titled 'Brittany Beach', purchased by the Victoria and Albert Museum in 1981 directly from Piper. | | |
| Swansea abstractions | 1965 | Minster Church of St Mary, Swansea, Wales | Patrick Reyntiens |
| | Description: Two single-light windows, commissioned together with individual but complementary abstract patterns, primarily in shades of blue with details in red, green and yellow. Notes: Installed in east wall of sanctuary, the two windows flank a large dossal that is painted to look like marble, also designed by Piper as part of the same commission. Like at Newport Cathedral, it was painted by Peter Courtier of the Royal Opera House. | | |
| Litany of Loreto | 1965–66 | Minster Church of St Andrew, Plymouth, Devon | Patrick Reyntiens |
| | Description: Five-light window with corresponding tracery above. Design based on the Litany of Loreto in which the Virgin Mary is given certain titles. Each panel contains a variety of attributes, all set on blue background. Notes: Lady chapel, east window. One of six individually designed windows for church. | | |
| Symbols of St Catherine of Alexandria | 1965–66 | Minster Church of St Andrew, Plymouth, Devon | Patrick Reyntiens |
| | Description: Five-light window with corresponding tracery above. Spoked wheel symbolising St Catherine's martyrdom shown on red background across three central lights, interlaced with the Cross of St Andrew behind. Symbols of the four Evangelists are shown in corners of two outer lights. Notes: St Catherine's chapel, east window. One of six individually designed windows for church. | | |
| Crown of Glass | 1965–67 | Liverpool Metropolitan Cathedral, Liverpool, Merseyside | Patrick Reyntiens; David Kirby |
| | Description: 16-sided stained glass lantern placed centrally above altar, known as the Crown of Glass. Dimensions approximately 22.5m high and 21m in diameter at its base. Each bay inclines forward by a few degrees to create overall tapered effect and is glazed with between 9 and 12 panels of bonded glass. Each panel measures approximately 3.6m in width and varies in height from between 1.2m to 2.4m. Notes: Architecturally integral to Frederick Gibberd's modernist cathedral, the glass panels that make up the lantern were made using a dalle de verre technique in which the glass was cemented together with epoxy resin within thin concrete ribs, a technique Reyntiens and Piper invented for the job with the assistance of David Kirby. With a glazed area of approximately 1,120 square metres it is the largest single commission undertaken by Piper and Reyntiens. Design inspired by a description from Dante's Paradiso of the Holy Trinity as "three great eyes of different colours each one winking at the other" conveyed in abstract shards of blue, green, red and yellow glass. | | |
| Five Wounds of Christ | 1966 | All Saints Church, Misterton, Nottinghamshire | Patrick Reyntiens |
| | Description: Three-light window with corresponding tracery above. A figurative depiction of the Five Wounds of Christ. The visceral depiction of Christ's bleeding wounds shows a hand and foot in the left and right lights, with heart to centre. These are set against green, plant-like forms in the shape of a cross on a dark blue background. Notes: Located above the altar in the Holy Cross Chapel at the east end of the south aisle. | | |
| Symbols of St Peter | 1966 | St Peter's Church, Babraham, Cambridgeshire | Patrick Reyntiens |
| | Description: Three-light window with corresponding tracery above, depicting the various symbols of St Peter. Left light, on green background, shows a fishing boat below and an inverted cross in the tracery above. Central light, on blue background, shows the Keys to Heaven, with Peter's chains, a fish and a keyhole in the tracery above. Right light, on orange background, depicts a crowing cockerel, with an anchor in tracery. Notes: Principal window in east chancel wall. Commissioned by Sir Robert Adeane in memory of his father and mother, Charles Robert Whorwood Adeane and Madeline Pamela Constance Adeane. | | |
| Malsis School War Memorial | 1966–67 | Chapel of Malsis Hall, Glusburn, North Yorkshire | Patrick Reyntiens |
| | Description: 17 tall, narrow lights ranged along the north and south sides of war memorial chapel, primarily of sharp-edged abstract forms in pale shades of grey, blue, green and yellow. Each window individually commemorates one of 16 former pupils and one master of Malsis School who were killed in action during the Second World War. On each is the name of the person to whom the specific window is dedicated and the badge of the branch of the armed forces in which he served. Notes: Malsis Hall, a Victorian manor house built in 1866, was home to Malsis School between 1920 and 2014. In the 1960s, a modernist war memorial chapel was built adjacent to the hall itself, designed by John Brunton Partnership. The chapel and windows were conserved as part of the subsequent conversion of the hall into a nursing home. | | |
| Tree of Life; River of Life; Creation | 1967 | All Saints Church, Clifton, Bristol | Gillespie Associates |
| | Description: Entire scheme of windows designed by Piper. Principal design seen in the floor-to-ceiling west window, on left a golden River of Life flowing from urn, and on right the Tree of Life with branches ending in red and yellow fruit, bordered with multicoloured stud-like spots. Above Lady Chapel is a variegated blue abstract design representing Creation. Sanctuary flanked by two red columns; smaller window behind Shrine of Our Lady completes scheme. Notes: Commissioned in 1963 on recommendation of Robert Potter. Liturgical theme agreed in 1964, executed in 1967. Fabricated from fiberglass panels by David and Ann Gillespie of Gillespie Associates. Piper worked by pouring coloured resin on each panel in situ, which he likened to painting on canvas. | | |
| The Sword and the Gospel | 1967 | Pishill Church, Pishill, Oxfordshire | Patrick Reyntiens |
| | Description: Figurative design depicting a Bible held open by a pair of hands with a red sword behind, on blue background with green leaf motifs. Notes: Window set into south west chancel; plaque records dedication to Phillip James Hall. | | |
| Living Radiance | 1967–68 | St Margaret's Church, Westminster, London | Patrick Reyntiens |
| | Description: Eight three-light windows filled with individual but complementary abstract designs creating "living radiance," mainly silvery grey with pale greens, yellows, blues. Notes: Eight windows filling length of south aisle, completed as a single commission. Dedicated 15 January 1967 in memory of Canon Carnegie and his wife, Peter Kemp-Welch, Clarence Fletcher and Richard Costain. | | |
| Harps | 1968 | Minster Church of St Andrew, Plymouth, Devon | Patrick Reyntiens |
| | Description: Four-light window with tracery above; two harps straddle central lights, green outlined in blue, on abstract yellow-orange background with silver-nitrate detail. Notes: North aisle window, memorial to Dr Harry Moreton; one of six individually designed windows for church. | | |
| Creation of the Animals | 1968 | Minster Church of St Andrew, Plymouth, Devon | Patrick Reyntiens |
| | Description: Three-light window with tracery above, depicting Creation of the Animals. Hand of God in centre circle, surrounded by birds and fish on mainly green background. Notes: South chapel, east window; one of six individually designed windows for church. | | |
| Southcote abstractions | 1968 | St Matthew's Church, Southcote, Reading, Berkshire | Gillespie Associates |
| | Description: Two lozenge-shaped windows with simple forms to centre that are suggestive of leaves or wings. North wall window is green with red detail; east wall window is white with blue detail. Both are framed with multicoloured stud-like spots. Notes: Modern church by Basil Spence, built 1965–67. Spence commissioned Piper for windows that mirror floorplan. Piper's second and final collaboration with Gillespie Associates using coloured resin on fibreglass. | | |
| Symbolic depiction of Heaven | 1968 | St Paul's Church, Bledlow Ridge, Buckinghamshire | Patrick Reyntiens |
| | Description: Abstract design across three lights and quatrefoils symbolising heaven; circles and rectangles offset by foliate motifs in blues with red accents. Notes: West window; plaque records donation by Louise McMorran, churchwarden, in 1968. | | |
| Tree of Life; River of Life | 1968 | Christ's College Chapel, Christ's College, Christchurch, Canterbury, New Zealand | Patrick Reyntiens |
| | Description: Two-light window with lancets representing Tree of Life (left) and River of Life (right) in semi-abstract red and light blue against turquoise/purple background. Notes: Commemorates Ernest Courtenay Crosse, former Chaplain/Headmaster; donated by widow Mrs Joyce Cross. Damaged in 2010 earthquake; repaired/reinstalled 2018. | | |
| Bakers' Hall Fires - 1666, 1715, 1940 | 1968–69 | Bakers’ Hall, London | Patrick Reyntiens |
| | Description: Three rectangular windows, each with individual but complementary semi-abstract designs depicting red, yellow, white flames on a blue background. Notes: Installed in the Livery Hall of the Worshipful Company of Bakers, which was rebuilt in 1964, to commemorate the three predecessor halls lost to fire in 1666, 1715 and 1940. | | |
| George VI memorial windows | 1969 | George VI Memorial Chapel, St George's Chapel, Windsor Castle, Windsor, Berkshire | Patrick Reyntiens |
| | Description: Two three-light, six-pane windows with abstract forms in shades of blue and red; third single light mainly grisaille. Notes: Chapel commissioned to George Pace in 1962 by Queen Elizabeth II as private burial chapel for her father, King George VI. In 2022, Queen Elizabeth II was herself interred here. | | |
| All Things Bright and Beautiful | 1969 | All Hallows Church, Wellingborough, Northamptonshire | Patrick Reyntiens |
| | Description: Abstract design across three lights and tracery, mainly blue and red, entitled 'All Things Bright and Beautiful'. Piper said: "it is what you make it to be". Notes: South chapel, west window, dedicated to Constance Chapman. Third of three individual commissions Piper and Reyntiens completed for church. | | |
| Let there be Light | 1970 | Chapel at Churchill College, Cambridge, Cambridgeshire | Patrick Reyntiens |
| | Description: Eight floor-to-ceiling windows in blue, mauve, gold, and green. Though entirely abstract, the theme is Let there be light (Genesis 1:3). At the east: humanity's search for truth and God's revelation. At the west: humanity's industry and God's creativity. At the north: humanity's search for beauty and God's response. At the south: humanity's search for love and God's response. Notes: Chapel built 1966-67 to designs of Richard Sheppard as part of his wider Brutalist scheme for campus; windows commissioned in 1967 and unveiled in 1970 as a memorial to Sir John Cockcroft. | | |
| Tree of Life with Fishes and Butterflies | 1970 | St Bartholomew's Church, Nettlebed, Oxfordshire | Patrick Reyntiens |
| | Description: Three-light window with Victorian tracery above. Central light: yellow Tree of Life with seven red fruits. Left light: green fishes on red; right light: butterflies on green. Notes: Central east chancel window. Given in memory of Dr Robin Williamson. First of two windows commissioned for church. | | |
| Tree of Life | 1970–71 | St Giles' Church, Totternhoe, Bedfordshire | Patrick Reyntiens |
| | Description: Three-light window with tracery. Tree of Life in yellow on blue; red pomegranates as eternal life symbols. Tracery depicts Resurrection symbols: fire, Phoenix, butterflies. Notes: Installed in east chancel wall; principal decorative focus. | | |
| Sea of Galilee | 1973–74 | St Andrew's Church, Whitmore Reans, Wolverhampton, West Midlands | Patrick Reyntiens |
| | Description: Large rectangular semi-abstract design of seven lights portraying Sea of Galilee as symbol of St Andrew the Fisherman. Rectangles and circles in blue shades with black/white aquatic motifs: water, foam, fish. Notes: Large west window, principal decorative element in Richard Twentyman's modernist church (built 1965–67). | | |
| Land is Bright | 1973–74 | Washington National Cathedral, Washington DC, United States | Patrick Reyntiens |
| | Description: Three-light window with tracery; Piper's signature Tree of Life motif in yellow on deep blue with red fruit. Notes: Located in narthex beneath south-west tower, a space dedicated to the memory of Sir Winston Churchill in 1974. Window is titled 'Land is Bright', taken from a wartime speech made by Churchill, itself taken from Arthur Hugh Clough's poem Say Not the Struggle Naught Availeth. | | |
| St Martin Dividing his Cloak | 1974 | St Martin's Church, Sandford St Martin, Oxfordshire | Patrick Reyntiens |
| | Description: Single lancet window with a highly original depiction of St Martin of Tours dividing his cloak to share with a beggar. Composition is reduced to just the Hand of God guiding the hand of St Martin to divide the richly coloured red and blue garment with his dagger, while the beggar's hand reaches up from below to receive it. Notes: North aisle, east window. | | |
| Easter Lily | 1975 | St Mary the Virgin's Church, Turville, Buckinghamshire | Patrick Reyntiens |
| | Description: Lunette window depicting a hand holding a white Easter Lily on a variegated blue background. Inscription at base of window reads my soul doth magnify the Lord…, an English translation of the first line of the Magnificat. Notes: Lunette set above north door, installed to commemorate nearby church of St Saviour in Turville Heath which was deconsecrated in 1972. | | |
| Suffer Little Children window | 1976 | St Peter's Church, Wolvercote, Oxfordshire | Patrick Reyntiens |
| | Description: Two-light window with quatrefoil above. Design shows multitude of children's hands holding the palms that greeted Jesus on his entry into Jerusalem, all depicted in vivid blue, gold and green tones. Notes: Bequest made by Alderman Bellamy and Mrs Maud Emma Bellamy, who left £1000 for a memorial window relating to the Biblical text "suffer the little children to come unto me." | | |
| Tree of Life | 1976 | St Bartholomew's Church, Nettlebed, Oxfordshire | Patrick Reyntiens |
| | Description: Two-light window with quatrefoil above. Depicts the Tree of Life in bloom with a variety of birds sitting on the branches, including an owl and a bird of prey. Above the tree is a crescent moon, stars and planets. Notes: South aisle window, west end. Memorial window dedicated to Colonel Peter Fleming. | | |
| Tree of Life | 1976 | St Mary the Virgin's Church, Fawley, Buckinghamshire | Patrick Reyntiens |
| | Description: Single lancet window depicting Piper's familiar Tree of Life motif in a novel manner, as a verdant vine abundant with fruit, flowers and leaves. Predominantly green, with detail picked out in reds, purples and yellows, on a blue background. Notes: Window commissioned in memory of Anthony Hartley. John Piper was a parishioner of St Mary's Church in Fawley and is buried in the churchyard. | | |
| River of Life | 1978 | Chapel of Charing Cross Hospital, London | Patrick Reyntiens |
| | Description: Single rectangular window with figurative depiction of the River of Life. On a green background, water flows out and down from a deep red vessel in upper section, with three fish emerging from the stream. Notes: Hospital chapel, on ground floor of the south wing, constructed as part of the 1973 redevelopment by architect Ralph Tubbs. This is the first of two windows commissioned from Piper by the League of Friends of Charing Cross Hospital, installed on the right side of the chapel entrance. | | |
| The Beginning and the End | 1978–80 | Chapel of Robinson College, Cambridge, Cambridgeshire | Patrick Reyntiens |
| | Description: Large expanse of glass set into the wall behind the altar and totaling some 66 panels, each approximately 1 square metre, set out as an inverted pyramid. Semi-abstract design shows the sun to the upper left which expands out to fields of green and blue, with leaf and floral details. It is partially obscured from most angles by the architectural conceit placing a dividing wall between the altar and nave. Notes: Entitled 'The Beginning and the End', or 'The Light of the World', the stained glass forms the central decorative feature of the chapel, built 1977–80 by Gillespie, Kidd and Coia as an integral part of the college campus. Piper also designed ceramic depiction of the Deposition on wall to left of window. A second window designed by Piper can be found in the antechapel. | | |
| Three Parables for Church Performance | 1979–80 | St Peter and St Paul's Church, Aldeburgh, Suffolk | Patrick Reyntiens |
| | Description: Three-light window with corresponding tracery. Across the three lights are depicted, from left to right, figurative representations of Benjamin Britten's three Parables for Church Performance; The Prodigal Son, Curlew River, and The Burning Fiery Furnace. To centre, on green background, a curlew is shown above a river and foliate decoration. To the right is seen the Prodigal Son greeted by his father. To the left three sinners burn in the furnace. Notes: Eastern bay of north aisle. Window commissioned as a memorial to Benjamin Britten and depicts representations of the composer's three Parables for Church Performance written between 1964 and 1968. | | |
| Tree of Life | 1981 | Chapel of Charing Cross Hospital, London | Patrick Reyntiens |
| | Description: Single rectangular window with figurative depiction of the Tree of life. On a blue background, the red tree is shown verdant with fruit and leaves in multitude of colours. Four birds sit among the branches. Notes: Hospital chapel, on ground floor of the south wing, constructed as part of the 1973 redevelopment by Ralph Tubbs. This is the second of two windows commissioned from Piper by the League of Friends of Charing Cross Hospital, installed on the left side of the chapel entrance. | | |
| Risen Christ | 1981 | Chapel of St Lawrence College, Ramsgate, Kent | Patrick Reyntiens, David Wasley |
| | Description: Large five-light window with corresponding tracery on theme of 'Let there be Light'. Main part of window was both designed and made by Reyntiens, with only the image of the Risen Christ in the central tracery light designed by Piper, which was executed by David Wasley in Reyntiens's studio. Notes: Primary east window in chapel. Piper's image of the Risen Christ is based on a Romanesque sculpture in the church of Beaulieu-sur-Dordogne, Nouvelle-Aquitaine, France. | | |
| Four Faces of the Green Man | 1981 | Library of Ipswich School, Ipswich, Suffolk | Patrick Reyntiens, David Wasley |
| | Description: Four stained glass roundels, each unique, depicting a colourful and stylised face of the Green Man and individually symbolising a different one of the four seasons, the four classical elements, and the four ages of man. Notes: Installed in the four corners of the new library of Ipswich School, built 1980–82 to the design of architect Birkin Haward. | | |
| Wiltshire Landscape | 1982 | Wiltshire Museum, Devizes, Wiltshire | Patrick Reyntiens, David Wasley |
| | Description: Single rectangular panel depicting various antiquities set in a Wiltshire landscape. Among the places depicted are the Cherhill White Horse, an avenue of Sarsen stones and the Devil's Den, shown alongside the Stonehenge urns, the Upton Lovell amber necklace and woolly-headed thistles. Notes: Commissioned by Wiltshire Museum in 1981 and installed in their Devizes building. Signed in glass by Piper, Reyntiens and Wasley. | | |
| Annunciation | 1982 | St Peter & St Paul's Church, Abington, Northamptonshire | Patrick Reyntiens |
| | Description: Three-light window, with corresponding tracery, depicting the Annunciation. the Archangel Gabriel is seen in the left light, a vase of white Easter lilies is the focus of centre light, while the Virgin Mary - unusually clothed in red - is depicted in the light on the right. Notes: Installed in the east window of the north chapel. Piper's model for the Virgin is taken from Sandro Botticelli's 1489-90 tempera on panel painting of the Annunciation, now in the collection of the Uffizi in Florence, Italy. | | |
| Adoration of the Maji | 1982 | Chapel of Robinson College, Cambridge, Cambridgeshire | Patrick Reyntiens |
| | Description: Small rectangular window depicting the Adoration of the Magi. According to Piper, the scene is set above the 'Sleeping Beasts of Paganism', while in the lowest section are depictions of the Original Sin and the Last Supper. Notes: Only window in the small antechapel off the entrance to main chapel, which houses Piper's earlier 'Light of the World' window. Inspiration was a Romanesque carved tympanum in the church at Neuilly-en-Donjon in France. | | |
| Tree of Life | 1982 | St Mary the Virgin's Church, Iffley, Oxfordshire | David Wasley |
| | Description: Single lancet window depicting familiar Tree of Life motif, uniquely reworking message of the Birth of Christ. Five animals are portrayed on the branches of the tree and in front, proclaiming in Latin: Cock – Christus natus est (Christ is born); Goose – Quando? Quando? (When? When?); Crow – In hac nocte (On this night); Owl – Ubi? Ubi? (Where? where?); Lamb – Bethlehem! Bethlehem! In the bottom panel is the quote "Let man and beast appear before Him and magnify His name together…." Notes: Designed and made for an exhibition in Bristol, it was only installed at Iffley in 1995 after being gifted to the church by Piper's widow, Myfanwy. | | |
| St Benedict Biscop window | 1983–85 | St Paul's Church, Jarrow, Tyne and Wear | Patrick Reyntiens |
| | Description: Single lancet window depicting a double-armed Jarrow Cross in white, edged in green and detailed in silver stain. It is set on blue background with red and yellow flame detail. The initials BB are inscribed below, for St Benedict Biscop. Notes: Positioned in the north wall of the original Anglo-Saxon chancel, commissioned to commemorate the 1,300th anniversary of the founding of Monkwearmouth–Jarrow Abbey by Benedict Biscop. Small window on opposite side of chancel is set with the oldest stained glass to be found anywhere in the UK, excavated on site and linked to Benedict Biscop's earliest buildings. | | |
| Christ in Majesty | 1984 | Chapel of St John's Hospital, Lichfield, Staffordshire | Patrick Reyntiens |
| | Description: Five-light window depicting Christ enthroned in Majesty, robed in royal purple, at the centre of a blue mandorla. Open armed, Christ welcomes two heralding angels that flank him to either side, both depicted in green. Behind Christ, set off to the left, is a Mercian Cross. The green foliate border has representations of the symbols of the four Evangelists, one in each corner. Notes: Principal window in east wall of chancel, commissioned by the Trustees of St John's Hospital in Lichfield. It would be the last major commission worked on by both Piper and Reyntiens. | | |
| Tree of Life with Fishes and Butterflies | 1984–86 | All Saints Church, Farnborough, Berkshire | Joseph A Nuttgens |
| | Description: Three-light window, thematically similar (but stylistically different) to Piper's earlier window for the chancel of St Bartholomew's Church in Nettlebed, showing three symbols of the Resurrection in typically colourful figurative style of Piper's late work; fish in the left light, the Tree of Life in the centre, and butterflies to the right. Notes: Occupying principal west window. Commissioned by the Friends of Friendless Churches in memory of Poet Laureate Sir John Betjeman, a friend and collaborator of Piper, who lived in the neighbouring rectory. Piper's final window design before his death in 1992, though not the last to be installed. | | |
| Annunciation of the Shepherds | 1985 | St Mary's Church, Lamberhurst, Kent | David Wasley |
| | Description: Two-light window with corresponding quatrefoil depicting the moment that the Archangel Gabriel announces to the shepherds news of Jesus's birth. Gabriel descends from the right across the upper part of both lights, while two shocked shepherds raise their arms in surprise below. Seven sheep and a sheepdog also react to the Angel's appearance. Notes: Positioned above the font in the westerly bay of the south aisle, commissioned in memory of Penelope de Rougemont. | | |
| Tree of Life | 1985 | St Peter's Church, Firle, East Sussex | David Wasley |
| | Description: Three-light window with corresponding tracery. It depicts the Tree of Life in heavenly Jerusalem, the most ‘tree-like’ of Piper's many renderings of the subject in glass. Hanging from the gnarled truck is a selection of musical instruments, as well as a variety of fruit and foliage. Either side of the trunk are depictions of the sun and moon, above a flock of sleeping sheep. Notes: Located in the Gage Chapel and entitled "Homage to William Blake's Book of Job". Commissioned in memory of the sixth Viscount Gage, whose family have patronised the church for 500 years. | | |
