= Yoesden =

Nature reserve in Buckinghamshire, England

Coordinates: 51.6748°N 0.8596°W

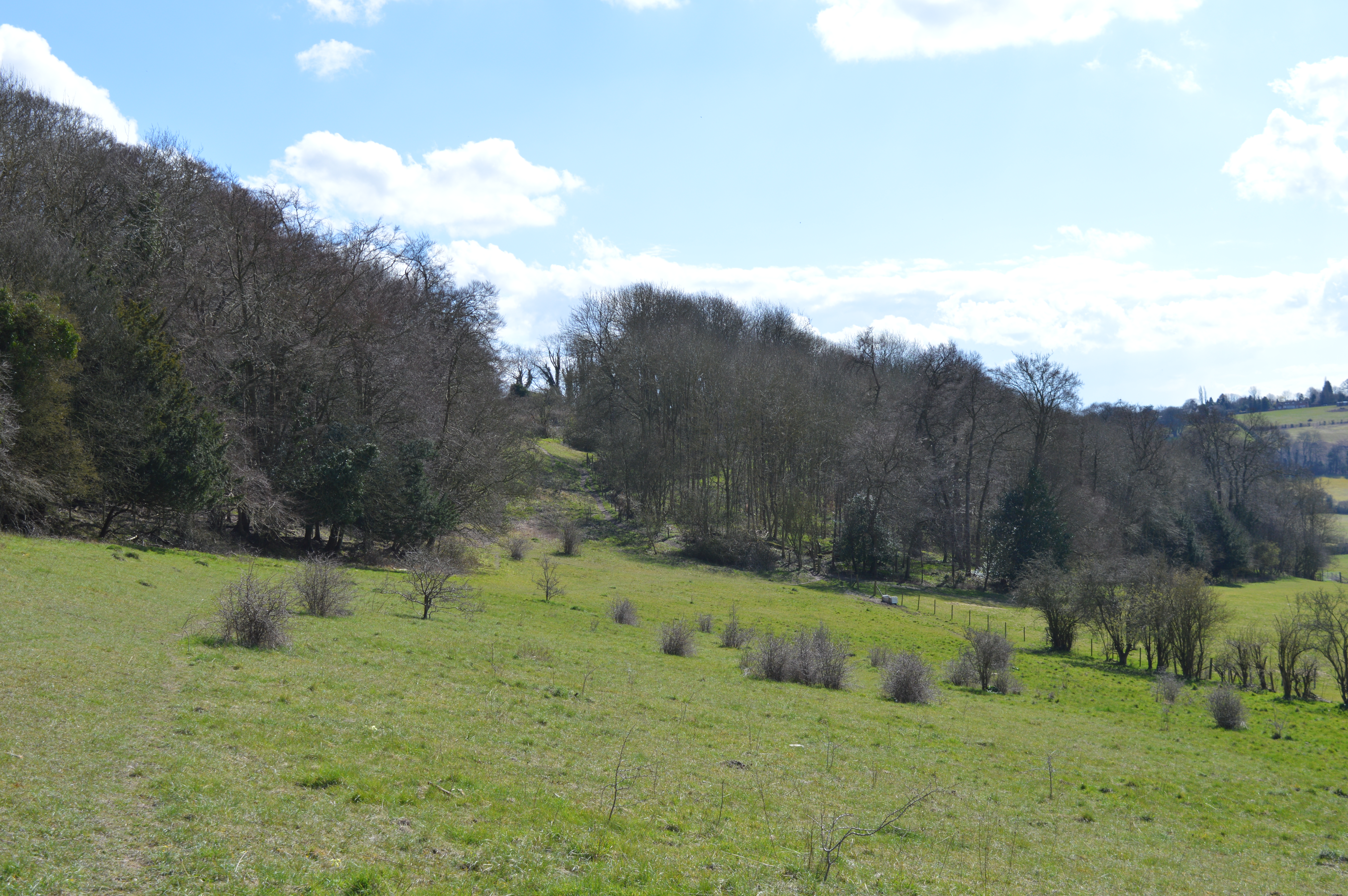

Yoesden, often known as Yoesden Bank, is a 13-hectare (32-acre) nature reserve in Bledlow Ridge in Buckinghamshire. It is managed by the Berkshire, Buckinghamshire and Oxfordshire Wildlife Trust. It is in the Chilterns Area of Outstanding Natural Beauty.

The site has areas of woodland and grassland. The steeply sloping chalk meadow has many species of butterfly, including three scarce blue species, the Adonis, chalkhill and small blue. There are flowers such as common spotted and fragrant orchids. Beech woodland above the chalk bank supports great spotted woodpeckers and red kites, and lower woodland has beech and yews.

There is access by a footpath from Chinnor Road near the Boot public house. The Chiltern Way goes through the site.
