= All Hallows Church, Wellingborough =

All Hallows Church
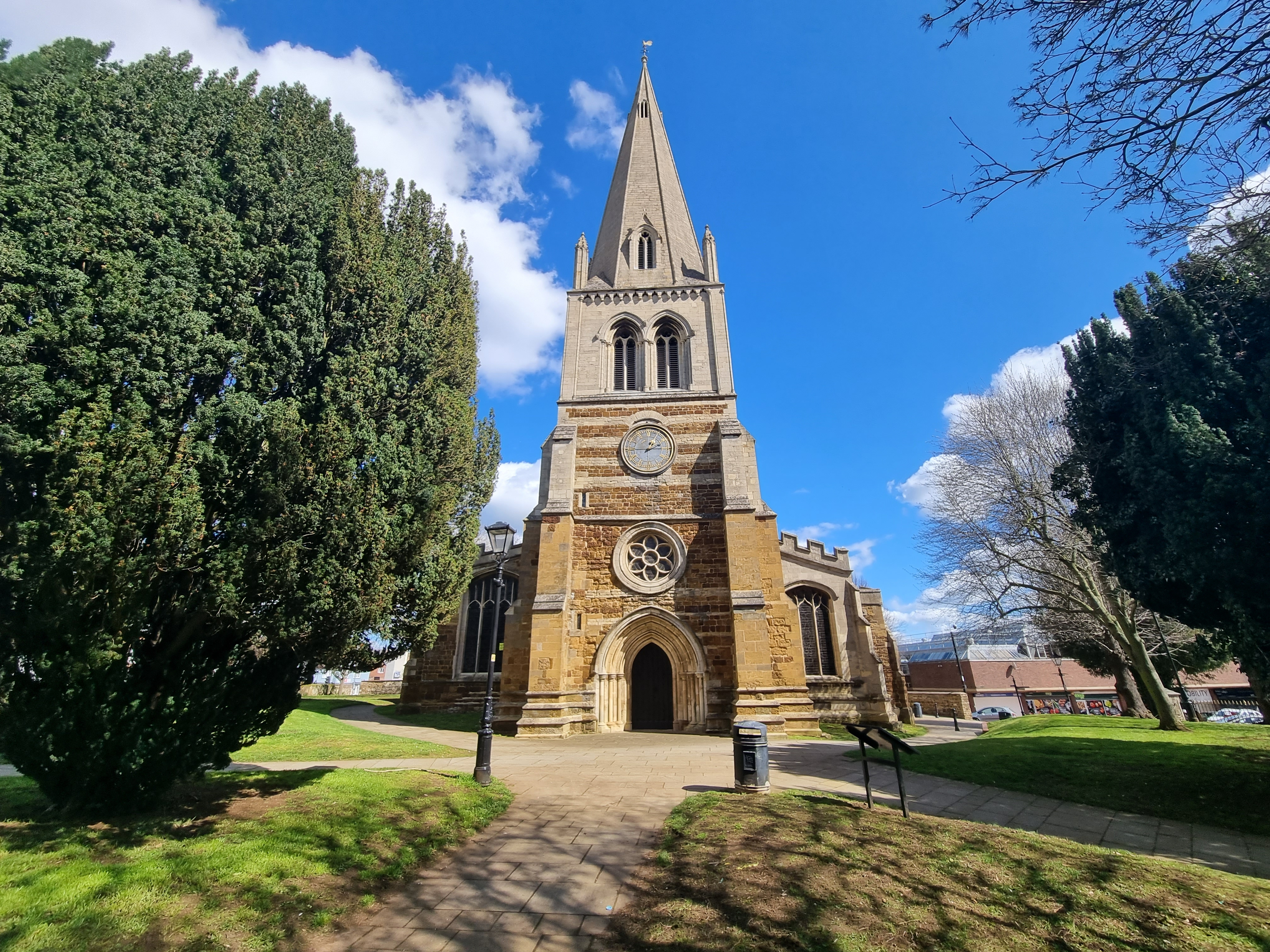
- Exterior of All Hallows Church in 2023
- All Hallows Church
- 52°18′09″N 0°41′37″W
- Location: Pebble Lane, Wellingborough, Northamptonshire, NN8 1AS
- Country: England
- Denomination: Church of England
- Churchmanship: Traditional Catholic

History
- Status: Active
- Dedication: All Hallows

Architecture
- Functional status: Parish church
- Heritage designation: Grade I listed
- Years built: 1160

Administration
- Diocese: Diocese of Peterborough
- Archdeaconry: Archdeaconry of Northampton
- Deanery: Wellingborough

The All Hallows Church is a Church of England parish church in Wellingborough, Northamptonshire. The church is a Grade I listed building.

== History ==
The church was built in 1160. Dedication to All Hallows recorded in 1517.

Construction of the existing tower began c. 1280 and took 20 years to complete.

On 23 September 1950, All Hallows Church was designated a Grade I listed building.

The church has a fine collection of mid-20th=century stained glass. The first to be installed is in the south aisle west window, Evie Hone's 1955 window referencing Old Testament symbolism in a definitively modern style. In the early 1960s, leading French stained glass maker, Jean Barillet was commissioned to provide a window on the theme of St Crispin and St Crispinian, patron saints of the shoe-making industry; it was installed in 1962. Three more modern windows, all designed by John Piper and manufactured by Patrick Reyntiens, can be found: in the north aisle west Evangelists and Prophets window dated 1961, rose window below west tower installed 1963, and an abstract composition in south chapel titled 'All Things Bright and Beautiful' from 1969.

== Gallery ==
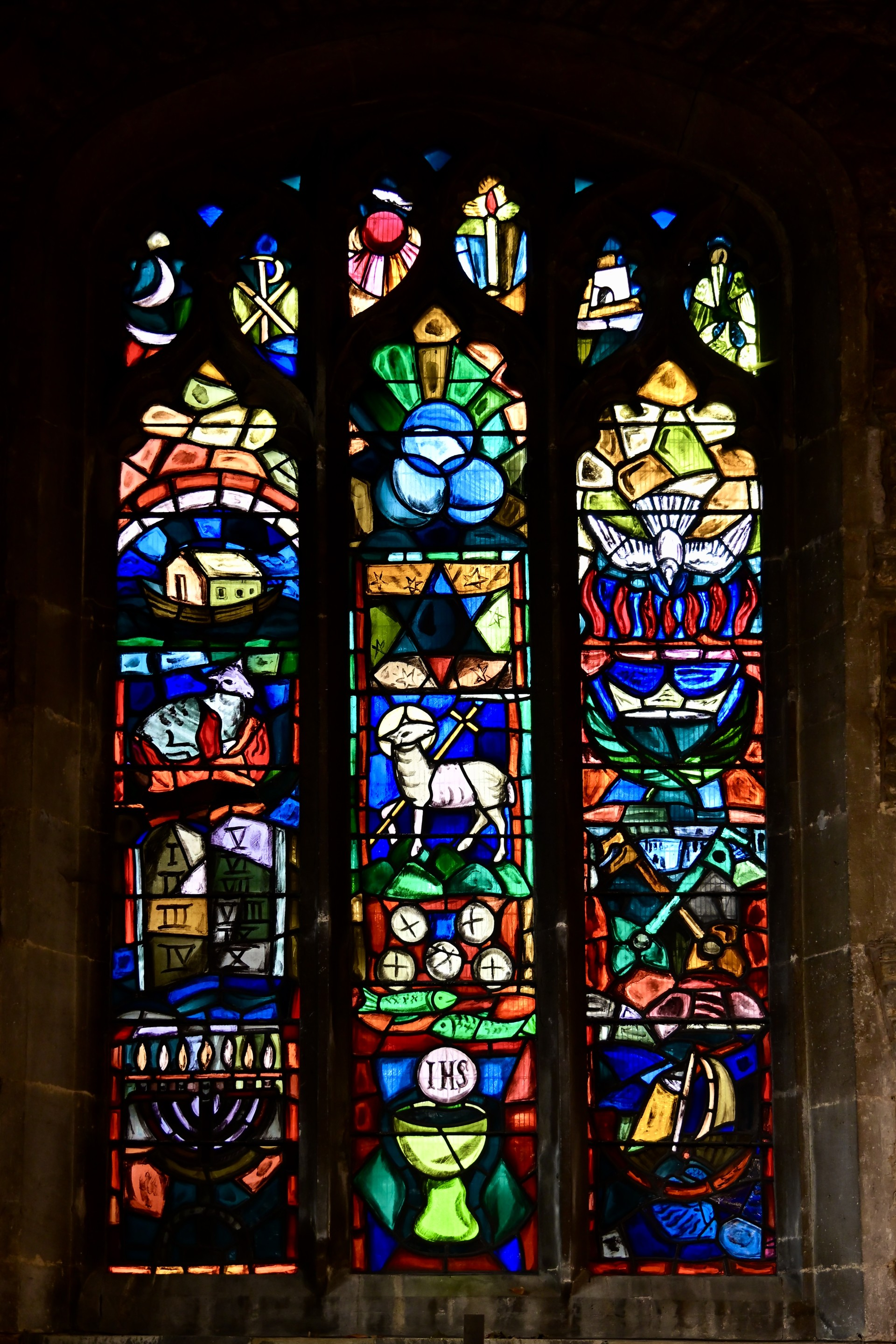
South aisle, west window (Evie Hone, 1955)

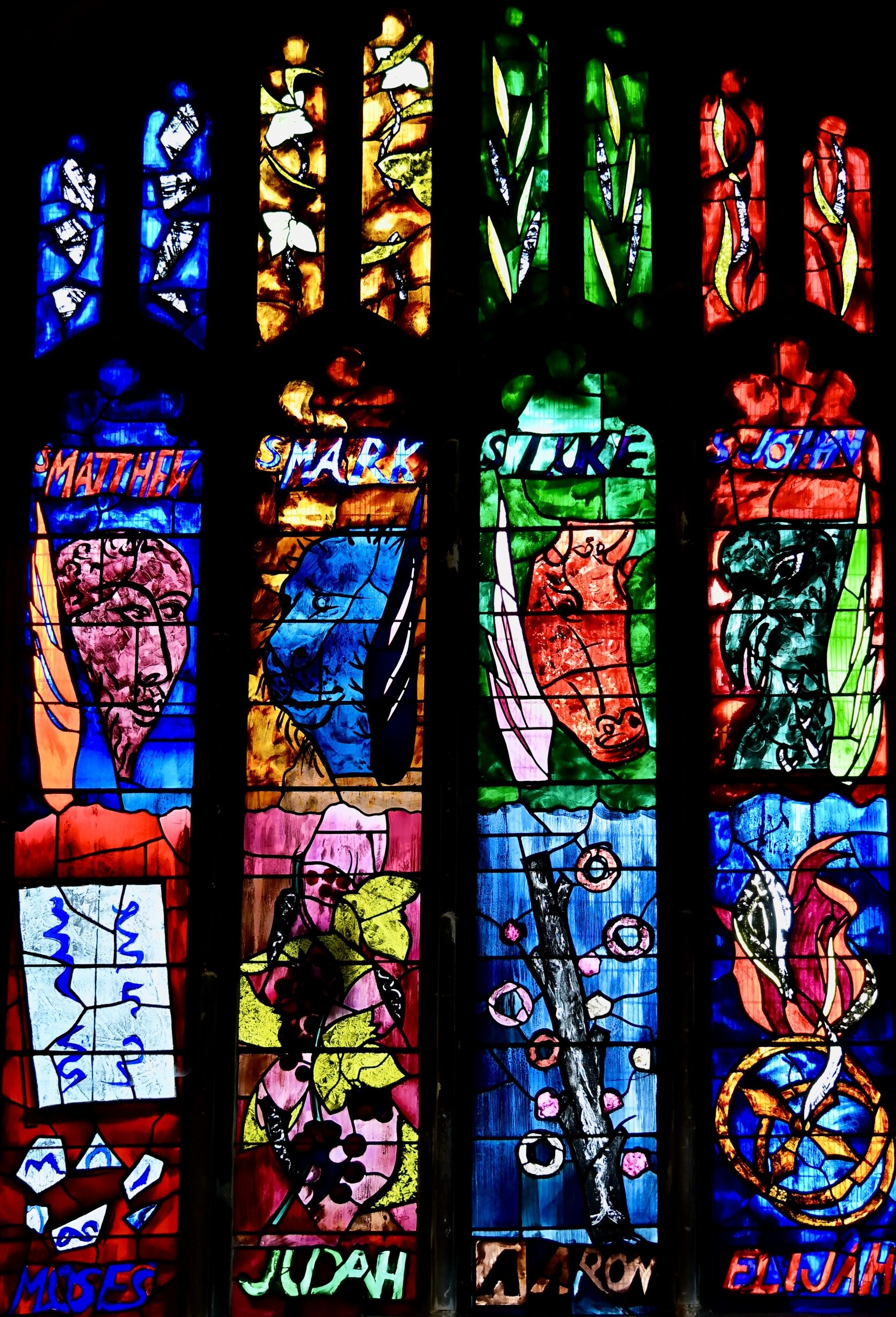
North aisle, west window (John Piper, 1961)

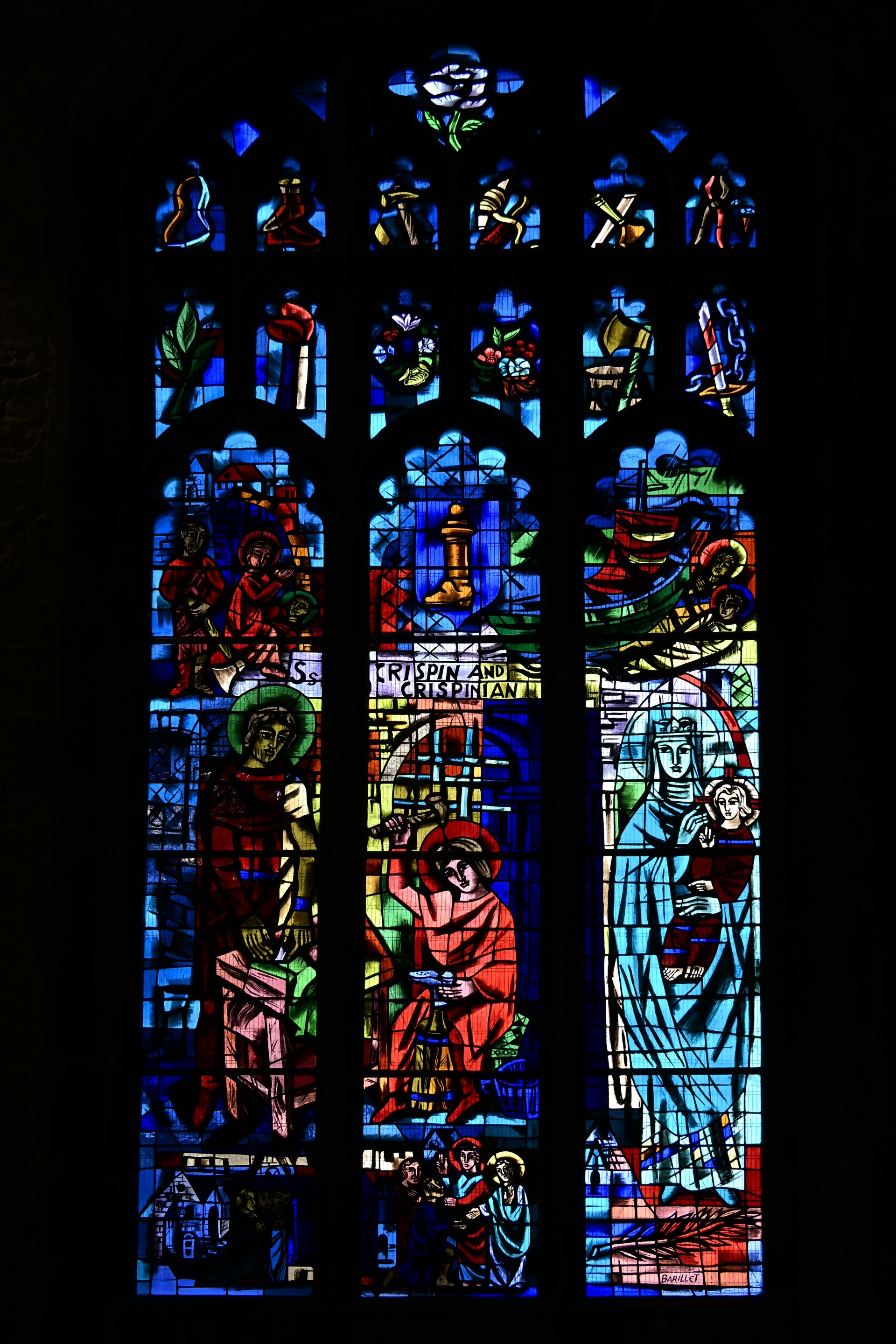
South chapel (Jean Barillet, 1962)

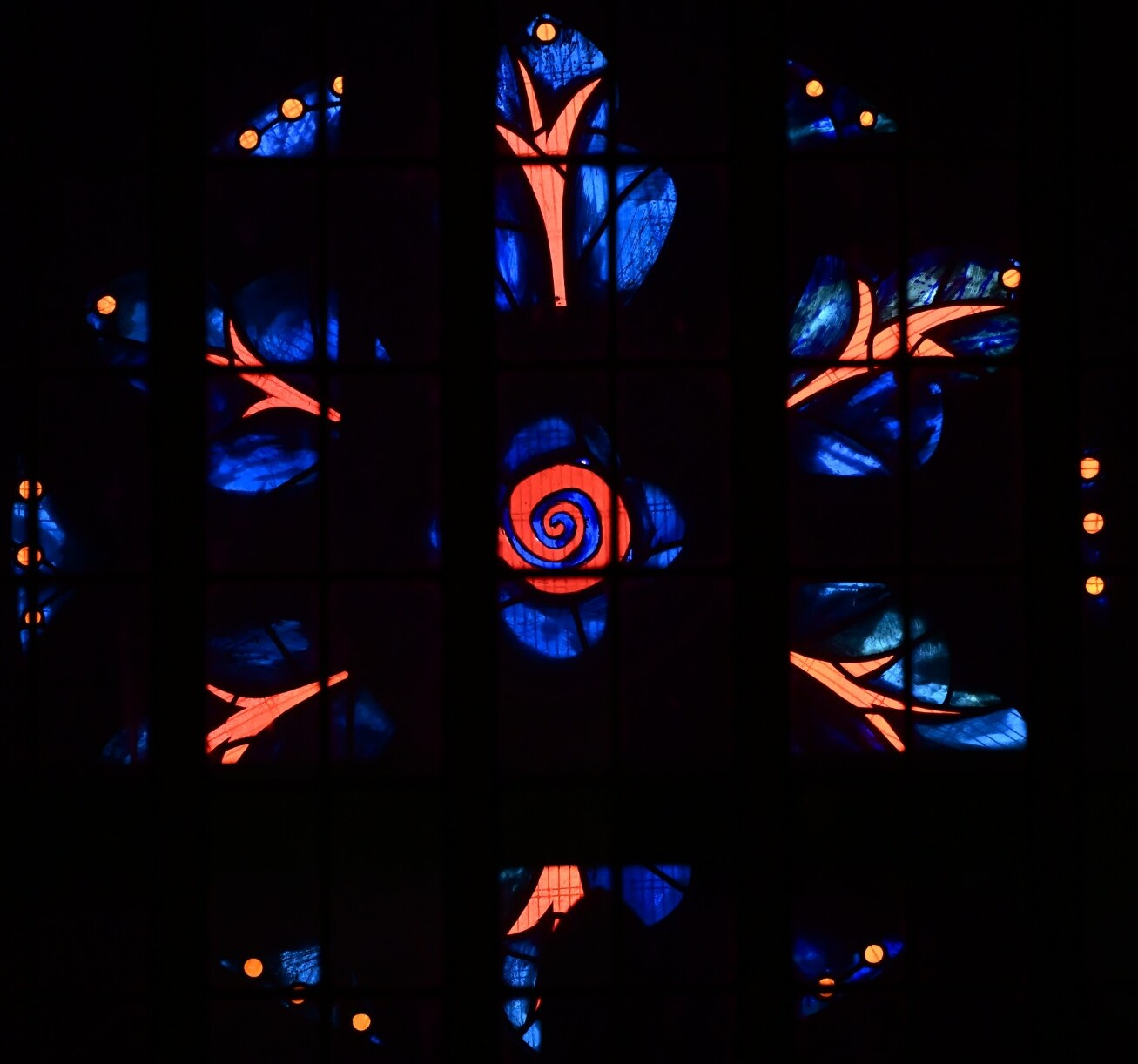
West tower window (John Piper, 1963)

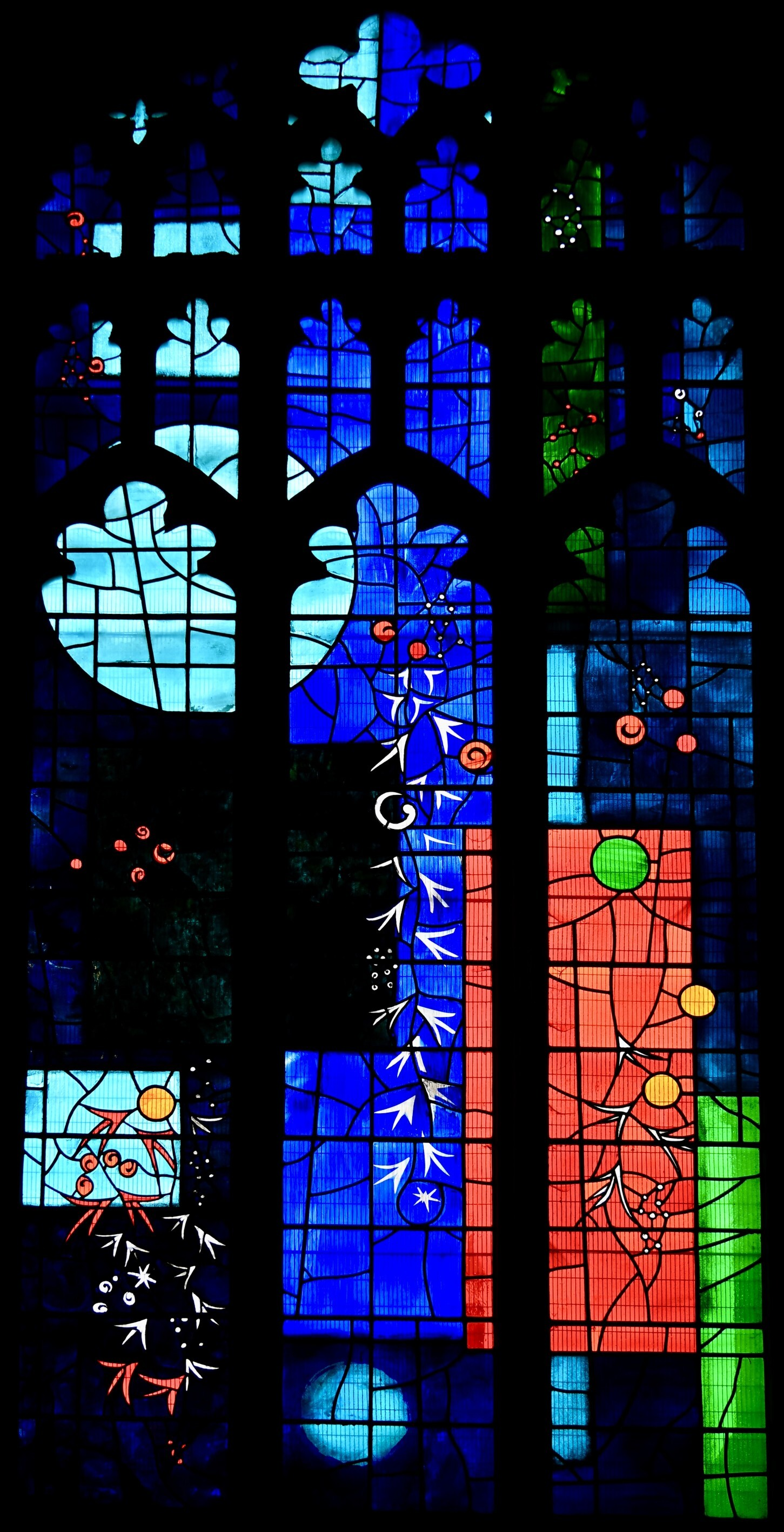
South chapel (John Piper, 1969)
