= Wessex Hotel, Winchester =

Hotel in Winchester

Mercure Winchester Wessex Hotel
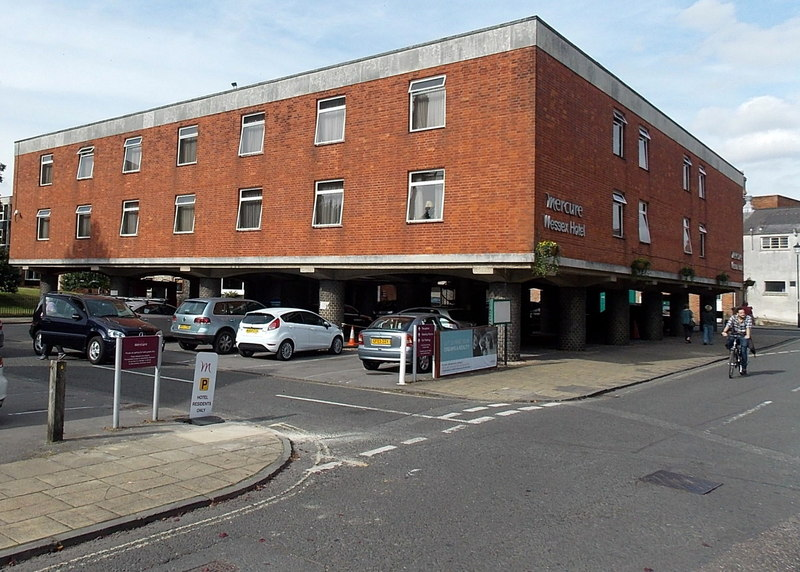
- Interactive map of the Mercure Winchester Wessex Hotel area
- Hotel chain: Mercure

General information
- Location: Paternoster Row, Winchester, UK
- Coordinates: 51.061393°N 1.311953°W
- Opened: 1964

Design and construction
- Architects: Bernard Feilden, Lionel Brett

The Wessex Hotel - currently operating as the Mercure Winchester Wessex Hotel - is a hotel situated on Paternoster Row in Winchester, Hampshire, England.

The hotel was designed by Bernard Feilden of the architectural firm Feilden & Mawson, with Lionel Brett acting as consultant architect. Built between 1961 and 1963, it opened in 1964.

== Architecture ==
Located directly opposite Winchester Cathedral, on what was once a burial ground in the north east corner of the cathedral grounds, the hotel occupies a prominent site in the centre of the city. It is constructed primarily from red brick with Portland stone dressings. Nikolaus Pevsner described the hotel as a "triumph of Modernism" and it is notable for its architectural incongruity with the mixture of predominantly medieval, Georgian and Victorian architecture that characterises Winchester's historic centre.

The L-shaped three-storey building was specifically designed to ensure that all of the public rooms have views across to the cathedral, which are correspondingly arranged along the south side of the main wing. A second square wing to the east, built around a central courtyard, is where the majority of the bedrooms are located. It has an open ground floor that is raised on circular pillars.

Its construction was not universally welcomed. In its annual report for 1964, the City of Winchester Trust noted that "the decision to break up the forms into sections so that the mass of the whole in no way competes with the Cathedral, has not been very well achieved" and that "large masses of unrelieved plain brickwork are extremely unattractive."

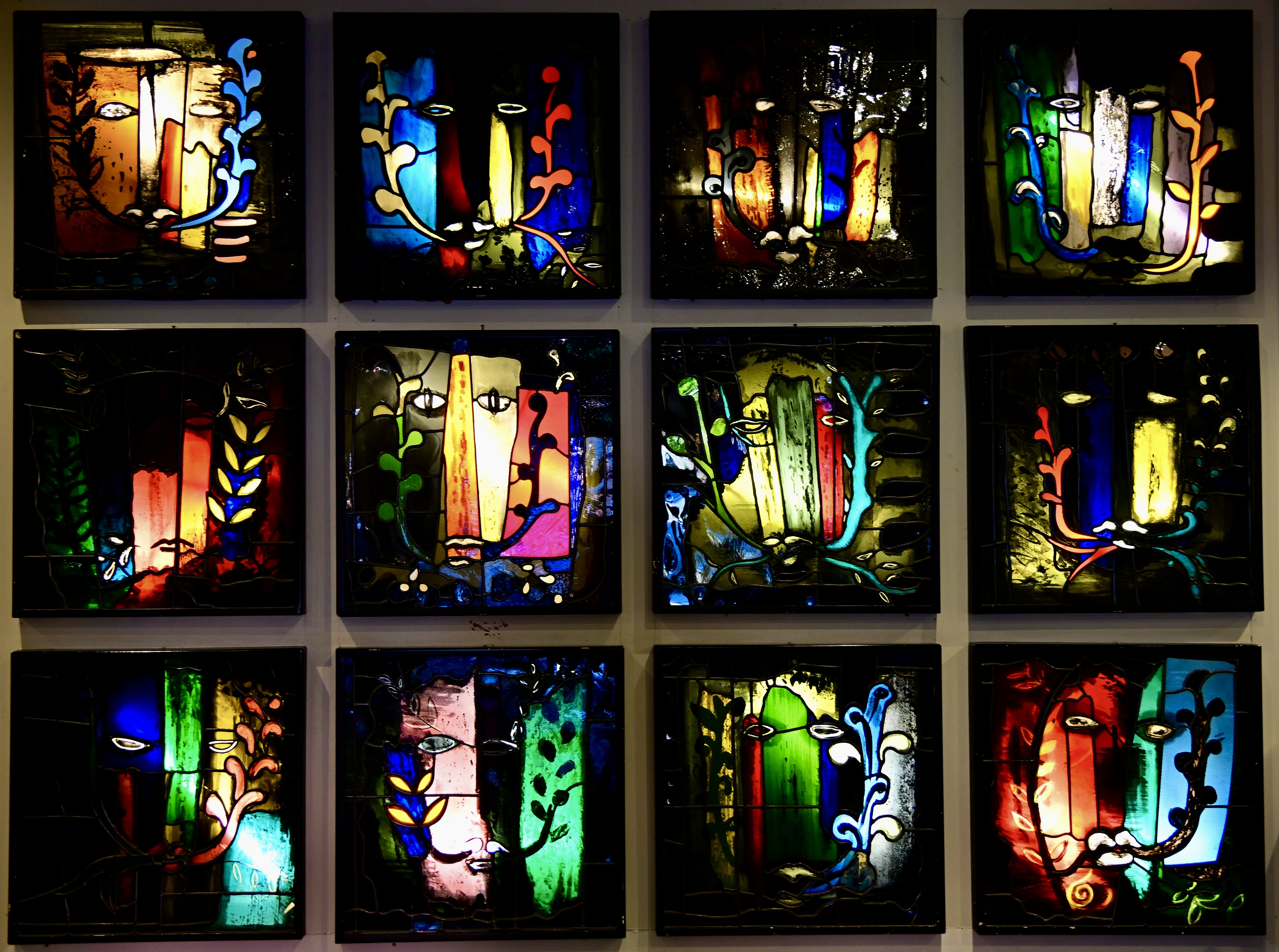
Stained glass panel by John Piper

In the foyer is a screen of twelve backlit stained-glass panels, each depicting an individually designed foliate Green Man head. These were specifically commissioned for the new hotel from John Piper, who created designs that were interpreted in glass by his regular collaborator Patrick Reyntiens. Now arranged in three rows of four, they were first installed in 1964 in a different location in the building and in a layout that included lost fibre-glass panels made by David Gillespie.
