= St Paul's Church, Bledlow Ridge =

- Church of St Paul
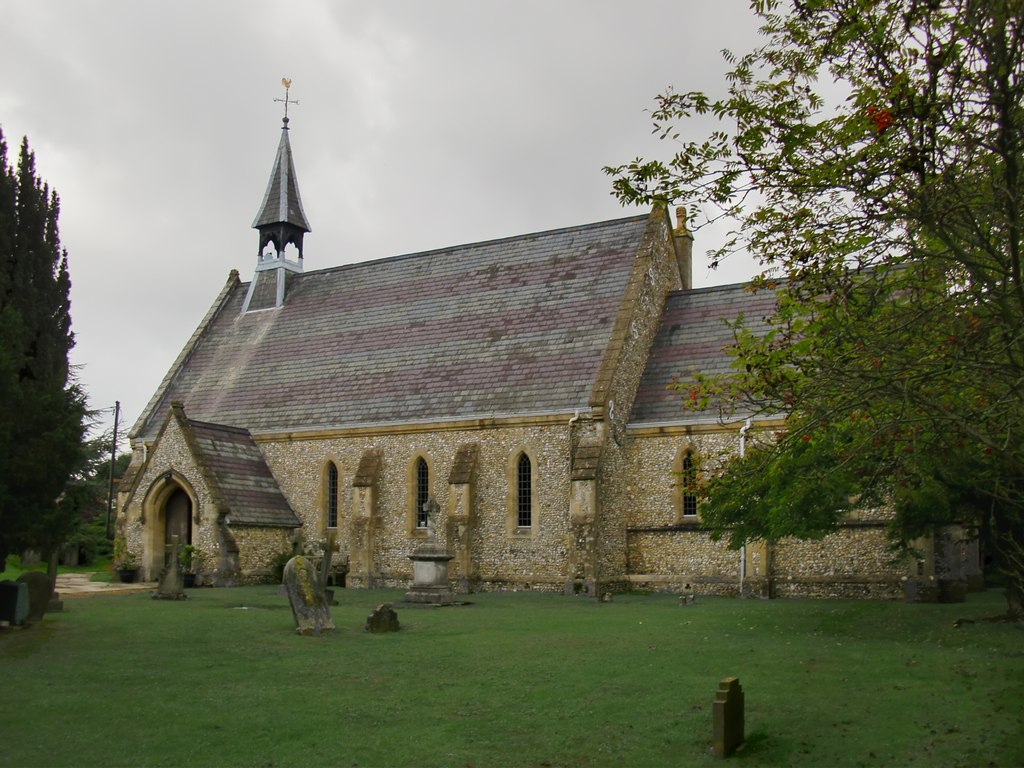
- St Paul's Church, Bledlow Ridge
- 51.672829°N 0.848083°W
- Location: Bledlow Ridge, Buckinghamshire
- Country: England
- Denomination: Church of England

History
- Status: Parish church

Architecture
- Functional status: Active
- Heritage designation: Grade II
- Designated: 26 October 1984
- Architect: David Brandon
- Completed: 1868

Administration
- Diocese: Oxford
- Archdeaconry: Buckingham
- Deanery: Wycombe
- Benefice: Bledlow with Saunderton and Horsenden
- Parish: Bledlow Ridge

St Paul’s Church, Bledlow Ridge is a Grade II listed parish church of the Church of England in the village of Bledlow Ridge, Buckinghamshire, England. It is part of the benefice of Bledlow with Saunderton and Horsenden in the Diocese of Oxford.

== History ==
A chapel of ease was erected in Bledlow Ridge in 1801 to the north of the village. This was replaced on a more central site in 1834. The present church, designed by the architect David Brandon, was built in 1868 and consecrated the same year.

== Architecture ==
The church is constructed of flint rubble with stone dressings and has a plain exterior with a south porch. The nave and chancel have side windows of Early English–style lancets, while the east and west windows are in the Geometrical Decorated style. At the west end of the nave is a timber bell-turret with a spirelet.

The interior is whitewashed and features a simply molded chancel arch on triple-shaft corbels. The nave roof has arch-braced trusses, while the chancel roof has scissor trusses.

== Stained glass ==
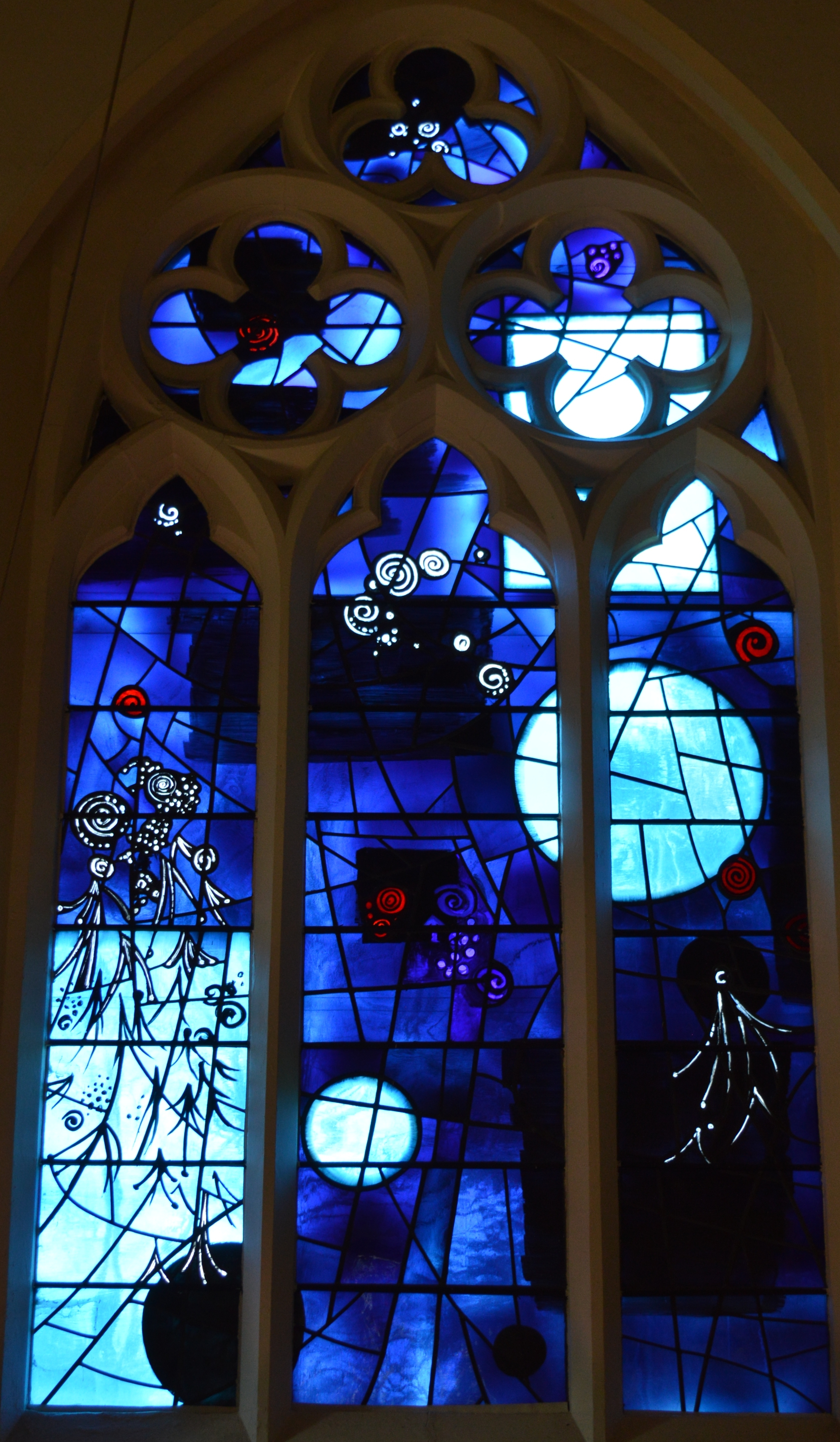
West window by John Piper

The east window is a three-light design by Mayer & Co., installed in 1904, depicting the Good Shepherd. A single lancet in the north wall of the nave, showing St Michael, was created by Geoffrey Webb in 1926.

The west window is a three-light abstract composition on the theme of Heaven, designed by John Piper and manufactured by Patrick Reyntiens. It uses shades of blue, white and black, with contrasting red detail, in an arrangement of circles and rectangles, offset by foliate forms. A plaque below the window records its donation by Louise McMorran, churchwarden, in 1968.

== Later additions ==
In 1989 parish rooms were added to the north side of the church, designed by Geoffrey Hawkins.
