= Patrick Reyntiens =

British stained glass artist (1925–2021)

Patrick Reyntiens OBE
- Born: Nicholas Patrick Reyntiens; 11 December 1925; Knightsbridge, London, England
- Died: 25 October 2021 (aged 95); Taunton, Somerset, England
- Education: Ampleforth College
- Alma mater: Regent Street Polytechnic, Edinburgh College of Art
- Spouse: Anne Bruce (died 2006)
- Children: 4
- Military career
- Allegiance: United Kingdom
- Branch: British Army
- Service years: 1943–47
- Unit: Scots Guards

Nicholas Patrick Reyntiens OBE (/ˈreɪntiənz/; 11 December 1925 – 25 October 2021) was a British stained-glass artist, described as "the leading practitioner of stained glass in this country."

== Personal life ==
Reyntiens was born in December 1925 at 68 Cadogan Square, Knightsbridge, London SW1, of Belgian extraction. He was sent to school at the Benedictine Ampleforth College in Yorkshire and was a practising Roman Catholic. He left school in 1943 and joined the Scots Guards, with whom he served from 1943 to 1947. His artistic training was first at Regent Street Polytechnic (now the University of Westminster) and then at Edinburgh College of Art.

At Edinburgh he met Anne Bruce (1927–2006), a painter whom he later married. They had two sons and two daughters, Edith, Dominick, Lucy, and John. In the 1950s, Reyntiens and Bruce bought Burleighfield House, a run-down country house near Loudwater, Buckinghamshire. The couple moved to Somerset in 1982.

Reyntiens died on 25 October 2021, at the age of 95.

== Career ==
=== Stained glass ===
Reyntiens began his career as assistant to the stained glass artist Jozef Edward Nuttgens (1892–1982), who lived and worked at Pigotts Hill, near High Wycombe, Buckinghamshire.

Reyntiens went on to collaborate with John Piper (1903–92), with whom he worked for 35 years. Their notable works together include the Baptistery window of the new Coventry Cathedral (1957–61) and the windows of the lantern tower of Liverpool Metropolitan Cathedral (1963–67). They also worked together on commissions for Church of England parish churches including at Bledlow Ridge (1968), Pishill (1969), Nettlebed (1970), Sandford St Martin (1974), Turville (1975), Wolvercote (1976), Fawley, Buckinghamshire (1976), and Eton College Chapel.

Reyntiens' solo works include windows for St Mary's church, Hound (1958–59), Christ Church, Flackwell Heath (1961), St Mary's Church, Leyland (1962), St Michael and All Angels Church, Marden (1962), the Church of the Good Shepherd, Woodthorpe, Nottinghamshire (circa 1962–64), St Anselm's Church, Southall (1968), All Saints' parish church, Hinton Ampner (1970), the Great Hall of Christ Church, Oxford (1985), Southwell Minster (1996), St Andrews Church, Scole and Washington National Cathedral in the USA. Some of his work is now permanently exhibited in the Victoria and Albert Museum, London.

His son John Reyntiens is also a notable stained glass artist. John has "translated" many of his father's designs, including for works at Much Hadham (1995), Anstey, Hertfordshire (2000), St Alban's church, Romford (2002 and 2004), the Church of St Mary, Stoke St Mary (2003), the Frances Bardsley School, Romford (2006), and St George's Roman Catholic Church, Taunton (2009). Their largest collaboration was for the church of Ampleforth Abbey: 27 windows in 2003, followed by two in 2004 and six in 2006–07. In 2011, John made a documentary film about his father's life and work, From Coventry to Cochem, the Art of Patrick Reyntiens.

=== Art education ===
From 1963 until 1976, Reyntiens and Bruce, a painter, operated a small art education centre at their Buckinghamshire home, Burleighfield House, which later became the Reyntiens Trust.

For a decade, Reyntiens was Head of Fine Art at Central School of Art and Design. He retired from the post in order to return to his own stained glass work.

== See also ==
- List of works in stained glass by John Piper

== Gallery ==
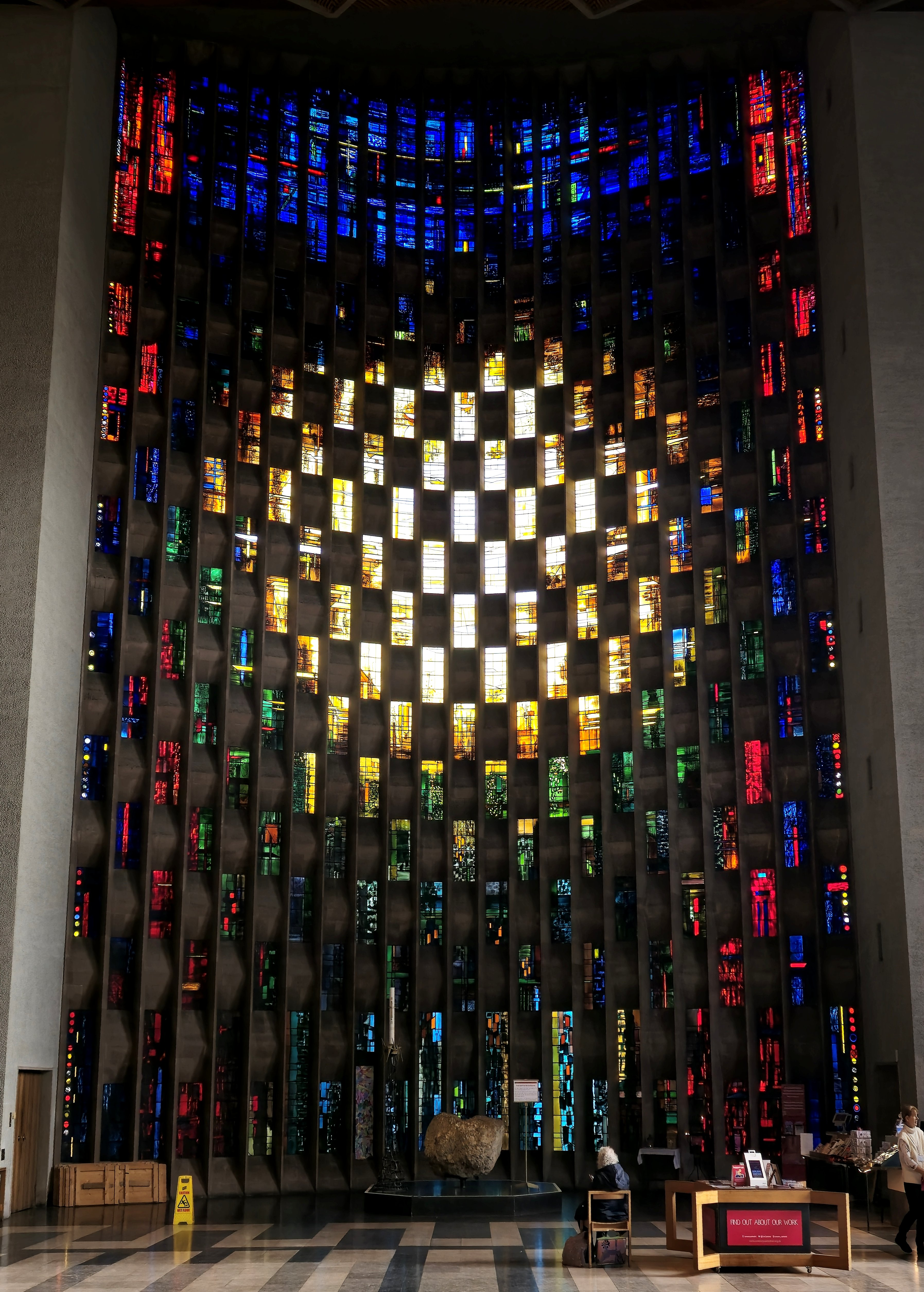
Coventry Cathedral baptistry window, designed by John Piper and made by Patrick Reyntiens (1958–62)

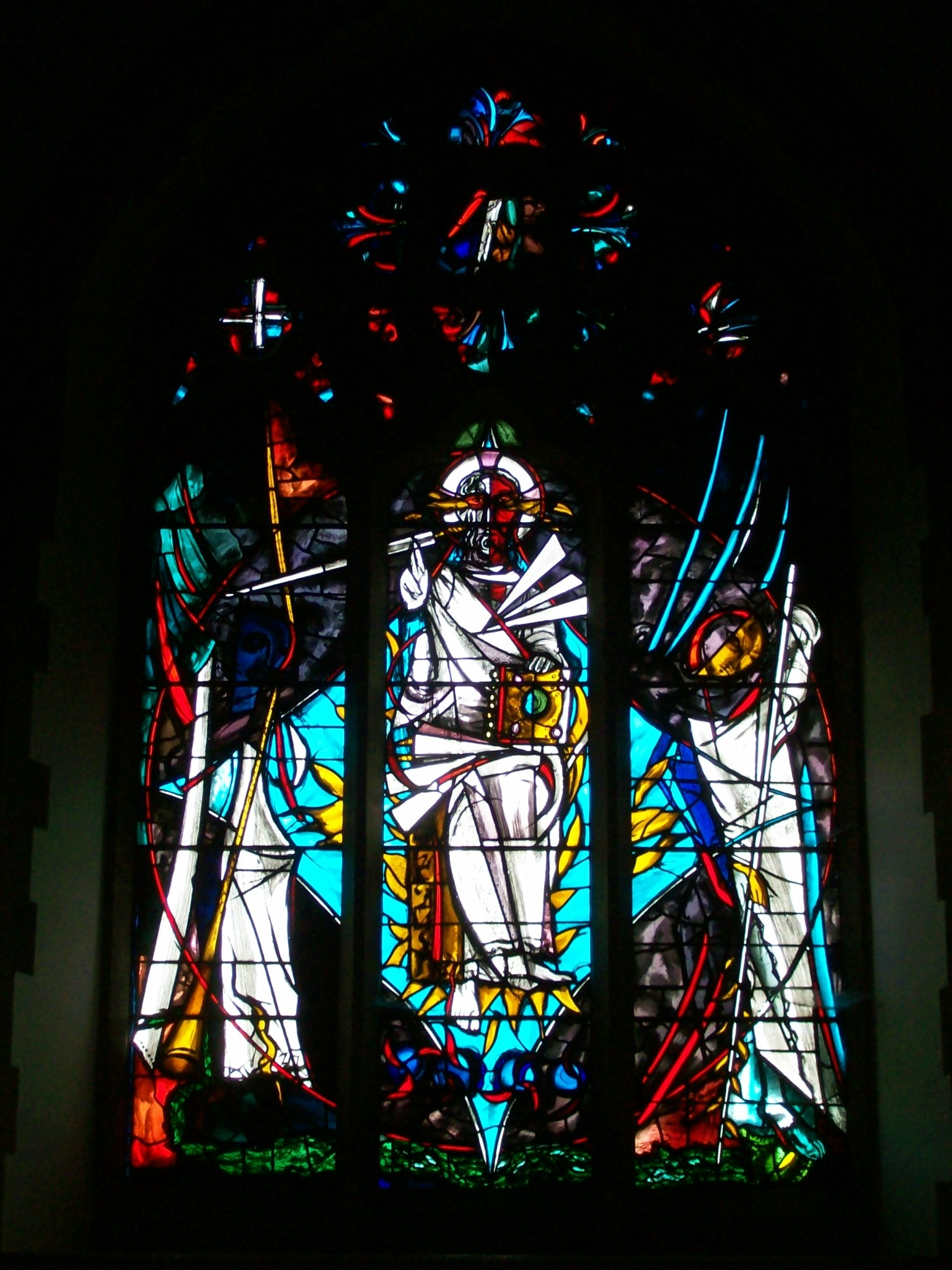
East window of St Michael and All Angels Church, Marden, representing Christ in Majesty (1962)

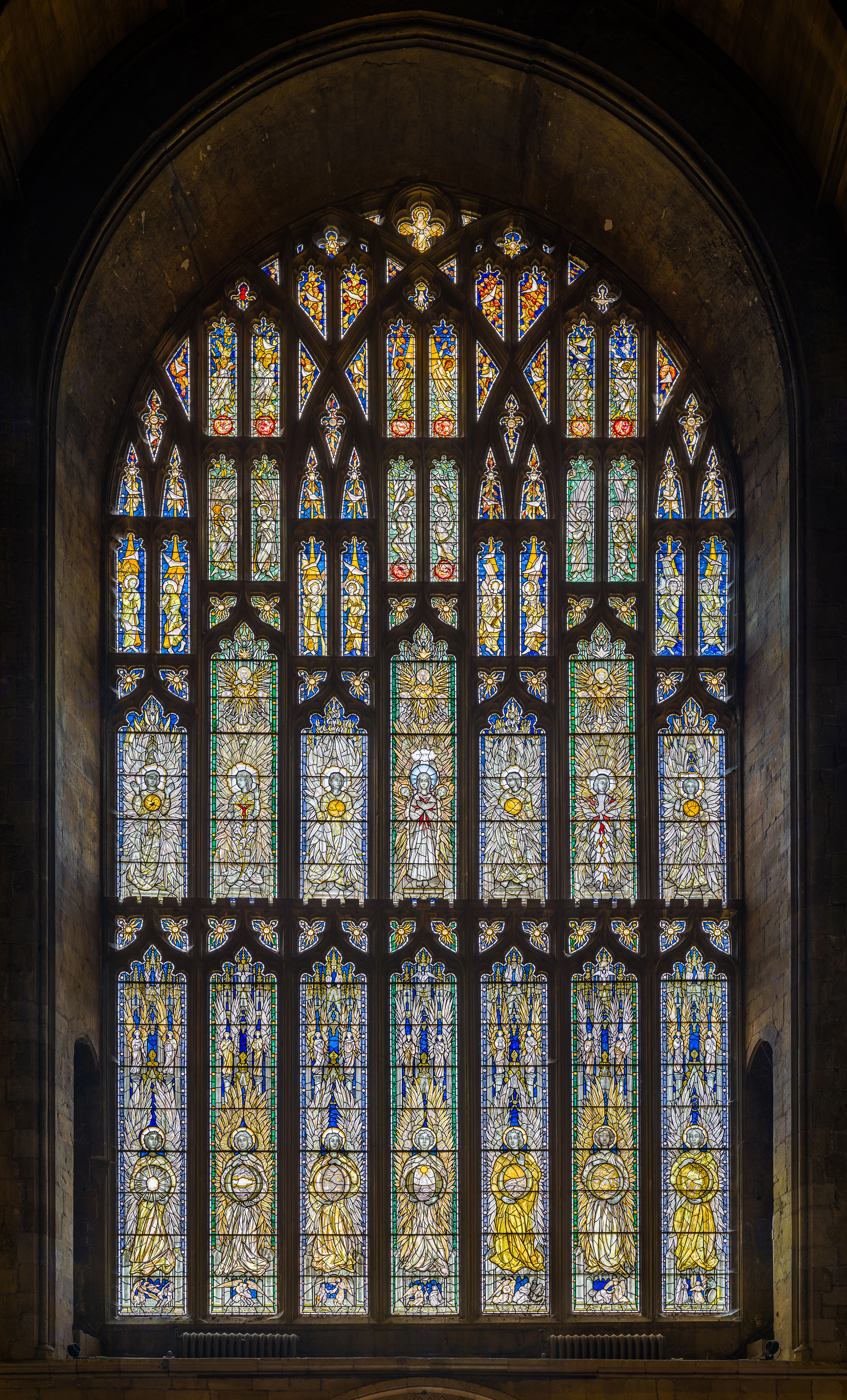
West window of Southwell Minster representing angels as beams of light (1996)

== Sources ==
- Anonymous (2012). John Piper and the Church a Stained-Glass Tour of Selected Local Churches. Dorchester-on-Thames: Friends of Dorchester Abbey.
- Horner, Libby (2013). Patrick Reyntiens: Catalogue of Stained Glass. Bristol: Sansom & Co. ISBN 978-1908326485.
- Lambirth, Andrew (December 2013). "God in a stained glass window". The Spectator. Press Holdings.
- Swengley, Nicole (22 May 2016). "How to spend it". Financial Times. The Nikkei.
