= Bledlow Ridge =

Village in Buckinghamshire, England

Coordinates: 51.671515°N 0.847433°W

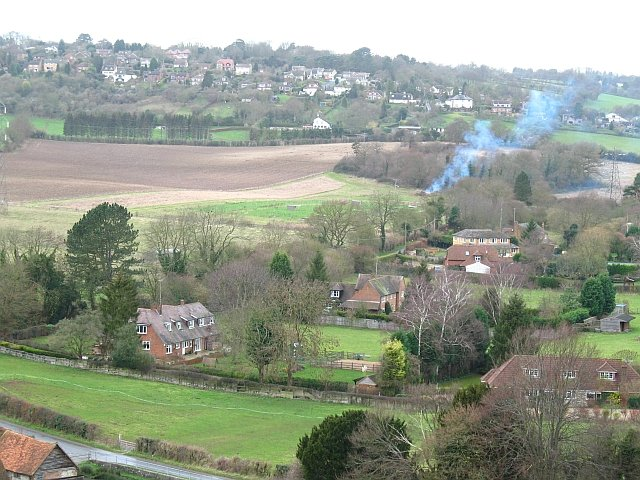
- Bledlow Ridge

- Location within Buckinghamshire
- Population: 940 (2004)
- OS grid reference: SU798976
- Civil parish: Bledlow-cum-Saunderton
- Unitary authority: Buckinghamshire
- Ceremonial county: Buckinghamshire
- Region: South East
- Country: England
- Sovereign state: United Kingdom
- Post town: High Wycombe
- Postcode district: HP14
- Dialling code: 01494
- Police: Thames Valley
- Fire: Buckinghamshire
- Ambulance: South Central
- UK Parliament: Mid Buckinghamshire constituency,

Bledlow Ridge is a village in the civil parish of Bledlow-cum-Saunderton in Buckinghamshire, England. In 2004 the population was 940. It is situated in the Chiltern Hills, about 4 miles south-southwest of Princes Risborough and on the road between the High Wycombe and Chinnor.

Originally the hamlet was within the ecclesiastical parish of Bledlow. In 1868 it gained independence as a parish in its own right when the new Church of England Church of St Paul was constructed.

In common with other similar villages in the Chiltern Hills properties have become increasingly sought after due to its location and the improvement in rail and road connections to London. It has a village shop, The Country Store Kedai, and a local school, Bledlow Ridge School. Bledlow Ridge has a number of clubs including the youth club "Bridge", Bledlow Ridge Tennis Club, and Bledlow Ridge Cricket Club. There is also an Equestrian Centre, a playground, tennis courts and a cricket pitch. Yoesden, south of Chinnor Road, is a nature reserve managed by the Berkshire, Buckinghamshire and Oxfordshire Wildlife Trust.

== Notable residents ==
- Sir Stuart Hampson – former chairman of the John Lewis Partnership.
- Stewart Copeland – founder and drummer of The Police.
