= Piper family =

English artistic family

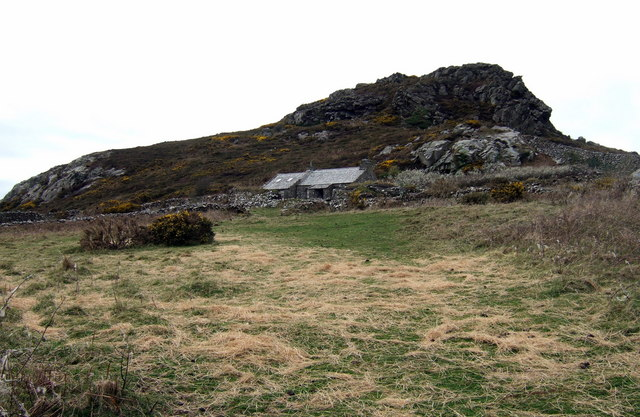
John Piper's cottage on Garn Fawr in Wales

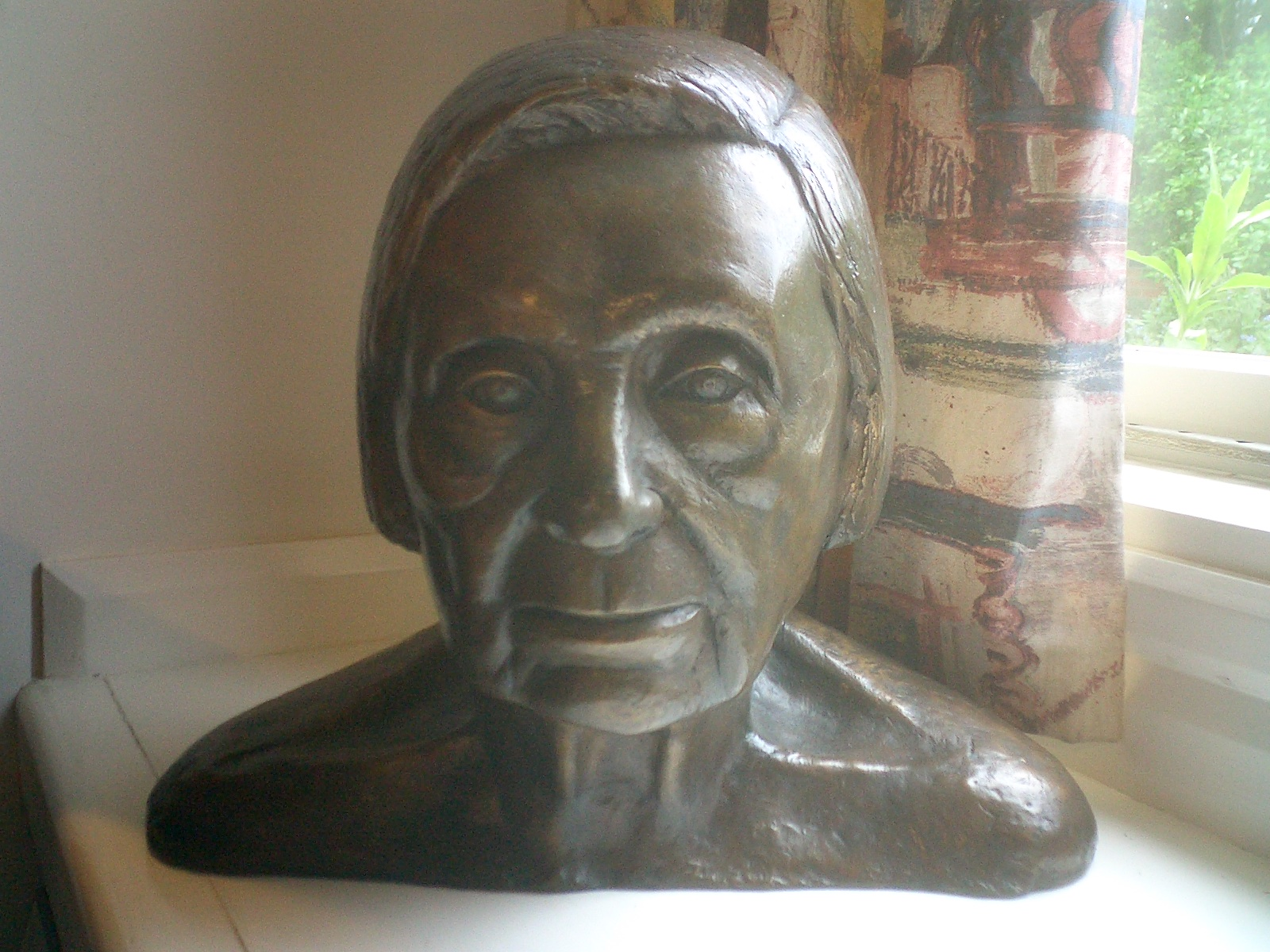
A bust of Myfanwy Piper, John Piper's wife

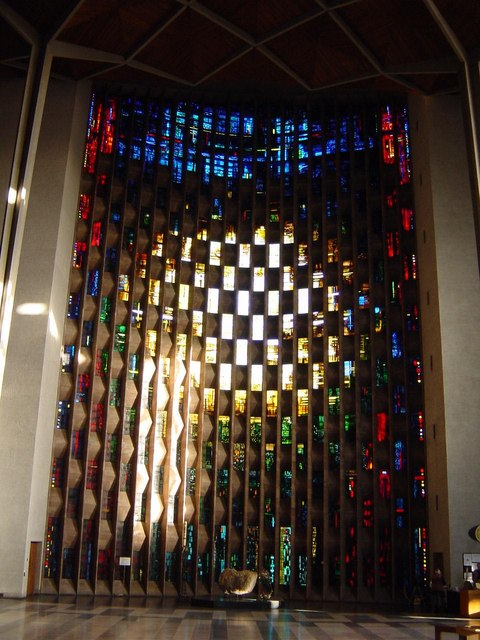
Stained glass window by John Piper at Coventry Cathedral

The Piper family is an English artistic family of several generations.

The Piper family dynasty of artists started in the 20th century with John Piper and his wife, the art critic Myfanwy Piper. Their sons Edward and Sebastian Piper were also artists. The sons of Edward and Pru Piper, Luke and Henry Piper, are a painter and sculptor respectively. To quote the art historian Frances Spalding: "In the course of their long partnership, John and Myfanwy Piper created what seems to many observers an ideal way of life, involving children, friends, ... and creativity."

John and Myfanwy Piper lived with their family in the south Buckinghamshire village of Fawley Bottom most of their lives. They moved into a derelict farmhouse and outbuildings there in 1938, which they then restored into a family house and studio. Both stayed there till they died, bringing up their family there. The potter Geoffrey Eastop was a family friend and collaborator, as described in his memoir, producing pottery at the family home in Fawley Bottom. He also stayed in the family's holiday cottages at Garn Fawr on Strumble Head in Wales, often with the Piper children. The poet John Betjeman was also a family friend. In the mid 20th century, John and Myfanwy Piper were at the centre of English cultural life. She transported her family around using a pony and trap.

In 2007, the extended Piper family exhibited jointly at the Messum's gallery in Cork Street, London.

== Charles Piper ==
Charles Alfred Piper (1866–1927) was the father of John Piper and a solicitor. His father, Charles Christmas Piper, had taken over the family bootmaking business, and was also a partner in a printing and stationery company.

== John Piper ==
John Egerton Christmas Piper (1903–1992) was a leading British artist of the 20th century. Piper used to make artistic expeditions to various parts of the United Kingdom with individual family members and family friends, including his wife Myfanwy, his son and fellow artist Edward Piper, poets John Betjeman and Geoffrey Grigson, and later on the family doctor and friend Alan Hartley.

== Myfanwy Piper ==
Mary Myfanwy Piper (1911–1997), John Piper's wife, was an opera librettist and art critic.

== Edward Piper ==
Edward Blake Christmas Piper (1938–1990), the son of John and Myfanwy Piper, was a painter.

== Prue Piper ==
Prue Piper (born 1938) was the wife of Edward Piper and a potter. She studied biochemistry at University College London and later worked as a potter in the village of Marston Bigot. She has exhibited at the Aldeburgh Festival, Messum's, Renishaw Hall, and Stonor Park, among other places.

== Clarissa Piper ==
Clarissa Piper (born 1942) was the second child of John and Myfanwy Piper.

== Suzannah Piper ==
Suzannah Piper (born 1947, Henley-on-Thames) was the third child of John and Myfanwy Piper.

== Sebastian Piper ==
Sebastian ("Seb") Piper (born 14 August 1950) is the son of John and Myfanwy Piper and the younger brother of Edward Piper. He is a painter, musician, and photographer. Sebastian Piper's paintings are abstract in style and he holds periodic exhibitions to sell his pictures, especially in Fawley Bottom near Henley-on-Thames. His music is based on synthesisers and he has produced a number of CDs including The Barn. He has collaborated with Gail Rosier of the Acorn Music-Theatre. He has collaborated with the River and Rowing Museum in Henley.

== Luke Piper ==
Luke Piper (born 1966) is the eldest son of Edward and Prue Piper, and is a painter, mainly a watercolourist.

== Henry Piper ==
Henry Piper (born 1969) is also the son of Edward and Prue Piper, the younger brother of Luke Piper, and is a sculptor. He studied Philosophy and Cognitive Sciences at the University of Sussex, UK. Most of Henry Piper's sculptures consist of assembled pieces of discarded metalwork and other objects, often in the form of faces and figures. He has also undertaken some stone carving. He has exhibited at Beaux Arts (Bath), Messum's gallery in Cork Street, the London Art Fair, the Affordable Art Fair (London), and at venues such as the Henley Festival, Renishaw Hall, Stonor, and elsewhere.
