= Luke Piper =

English painter

Luke Piper (born 1966) is an English landscape painter, especially in watercolours. The Guardian newspaper has described him as "arts establishment aristocracy".

== Biography ==
Luke Piper is the son of the painter Edward Piper. He is also the eldest grandson of another artist, John Piper. He grew up in Frome, Somerset and is still based in the county. He studied at Frome College and then studied geography at the University of Cambridge.

Piper's first major show of artworks was at the CCA Galleries, Dover Street, London, in 1992, also used by his father, and has produced prints in association with the CCA Galleries since 1994. Since that time he has exhibited regularly in London and at venues such as the Henley Festival, Renishaw Hall, the River and Rowing Museum, Stonor, the West Wales Art Centre, The Wykeham Gallery, the Museum of Somerset, Messum's. (in Cork Street, London) and elsewhere in the United Kingdom.

Luke Piper has travelled around the world to paint, including Nairobi via Western Sahara and Zaire in 1995, the Sahara desert in 1999 and 2000, Nepal and the Himalayas in 1998 and 2000–01, and Australia, New Zealand and Fiji in 2002–03. In 2008, he painted in Egypt (including Luxor), Greece (including Paxos), Switzerland and Italy. He has also painted in France, Ireland and Spain as well as around the United Kingdom, including many paintings of the River Thames.

Piper married in 1997. His younger brother Henry Piper is a sculptor.

== See also ==
- Piper family
