= Fawley =

Fawley may refer to:

== Places in the United Kingdom ==
- Fawley, Berkshire, a village and civil parish in West Berkshire
- South Fawley (or Little Fawley), a village in Berkshire
- Fawley, Buckinghamshire, a village in Buckinghamshire
- Fawley Bottom, a small village in south Buckinghamshire
- Fawley, Hampshire, a village in Hampshire
  - Fawley Refinery
- Fawley Chapel, a village in Herefordshire

== People with the surname ==
- Ben Fawley, confessed murderer of Taylor Behl, 2006
- Willis Fawley (born 1929), English rugby league footballer of the 1960s and 1970s

=== Fictional people ===
- Jude Fawley, the main character in the novel Jude the Obscure by Thomas Hardy

== Other ==
- SS Empire Fawley, the original name of SS Clan Mackinlay, built in 1945
- Fawley Court, a manor house and estate in Fawley, Buckinghamshire, U.K.
- Fawley branch line, a railway line to Fawley, Hampshire, U.K.
- Fawley A.F.C., a football club based in Fawley, Hampshire, U.K.
- Fawley Power Station, between the villages of Fawley and Calshot in Hampshire, U.K.
