= Myfanwy Piper =

Librettist and art critic (1911–1997)

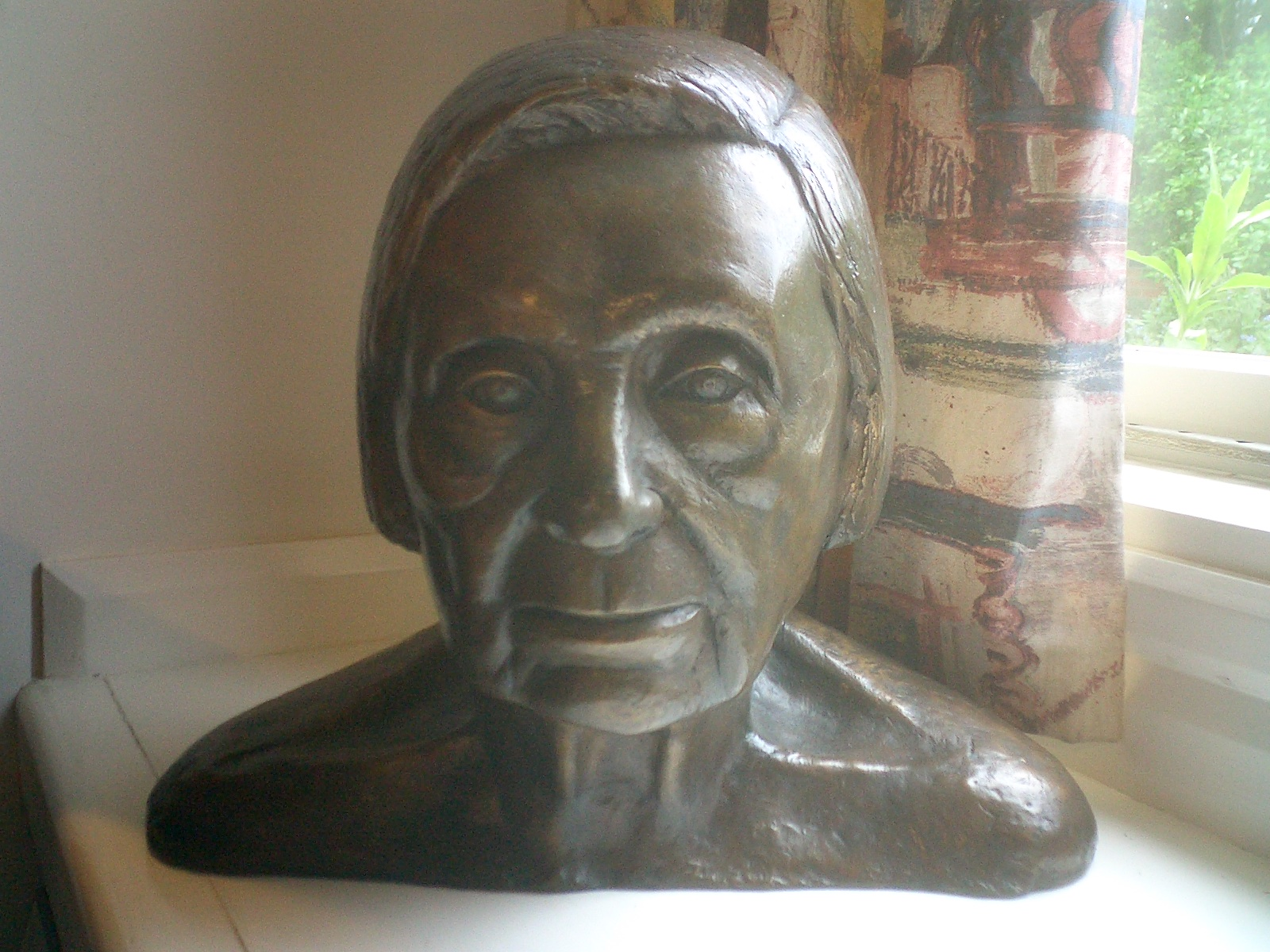
- Bust of Myfanwy Piper
- Born: Mary Myfanwy Evans; 28 March 1911; London, England
- Died: 18 January 1997 (aged 85); Fawley Bottom, Buckinghamshire, England
- Education: North London Collegiate School; St Hugh's College, Oxford
- Occupations: Art critic and opera librettist
- Spouse: John Piper (m. 1937–1992, his death)
- Children: 4, inc. Edward Piper

Mary Myfanwy Piper (/məˈfɑːnwiː/; Welsh pronunciation: [məˈvanuj]; 28 March 1911 – 18 January 1997) was a British art critic and opera librettist. She was the founder of the periodical Axis, which was devoted to abstract art. She collaborated with the composer Benjamin Britten on several of his operas, with composer Alun Hoddinott on most of his operatic works, and was a friend of the poet John Betjeman, who wrote poems addressing her.

== Biography ==
Mary Myfanwy Evans was born on 28 March 1911 in London, England. Her father was a chemist in Hampstead, north London, and her mother was English, of Huguenot origins. Both her grandfathers were ministers. She attended North London Collegiate School, where she won a scholarship to read English Language and Literature at St Hugh's College, Oxford in 1930. She swam competitively at college.

From 1935 to 1937, Piper edited the periodical Axis, which was devoted to abstract art. She had been encouraged to found the periodical by French-American abstract painter Jean Helion.

In 1937, she married the artist John Piper, and lived with him in rural surroundings at Fawley Bottom, Buckinghamshire (near Henley-on-Thames), for much of her life.

Between 1954 and 1973, she collaborated with the composer Benjamin Britten on several of his operas, and between 1977 and 1981 with composer Alun Hoddinott on most of his operatic works. She was a friend of the poet John Betjeman, who wrote several poems addressing her, such as "Myfanwy" and "Myfanwy at Oxford".

She and John Piper had two sons and two daughters. Her elder son, painter Edward Piper, predeceased her in 1990.

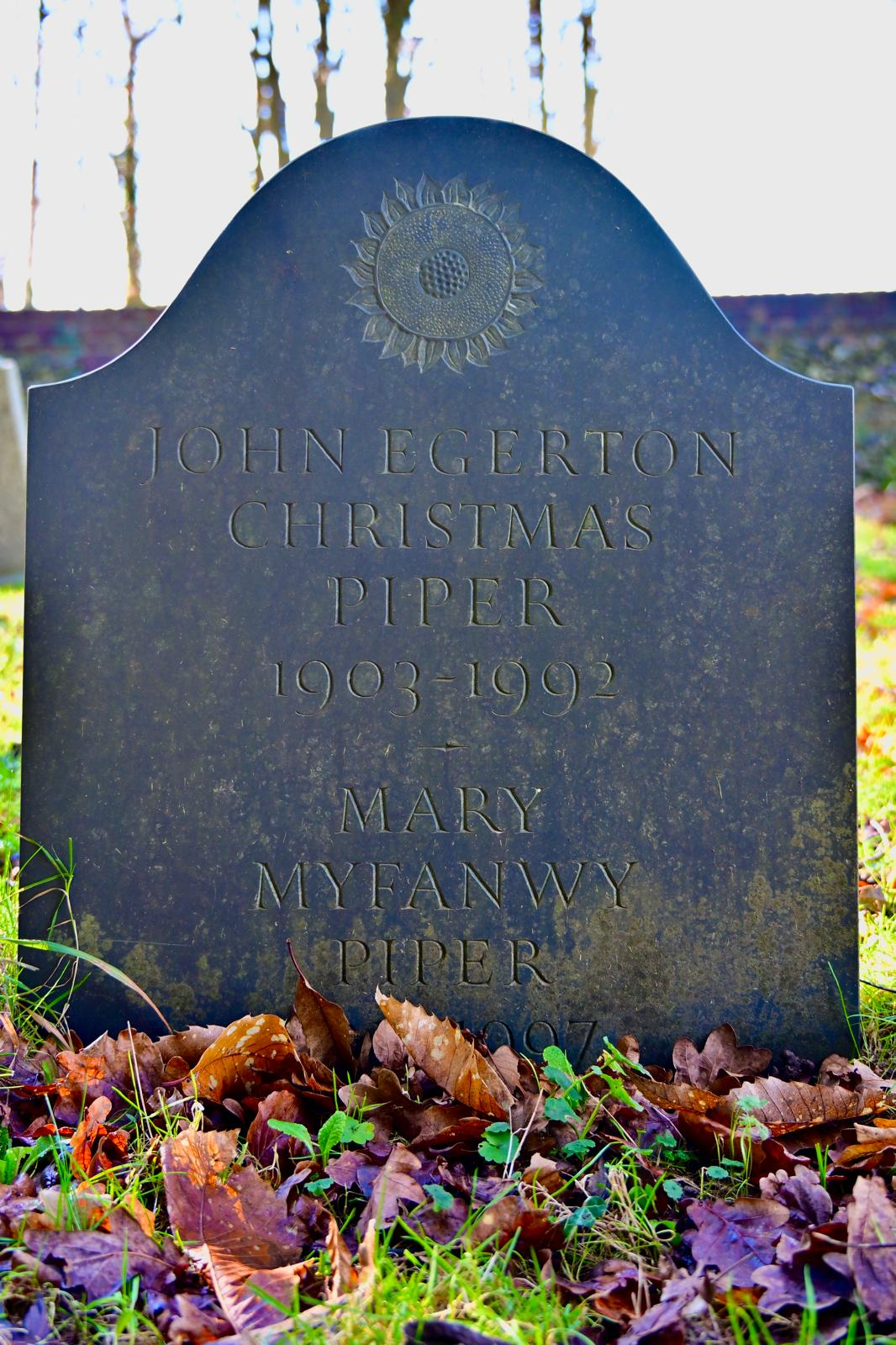
Gravestone of Myfanwy and John Piper at St Mary the Virgin's Church, Fawley

Myfanwy Piper died at her home in Fawley Bottom on 18 January 1997. She was buried at St Mary the Virgin's Church, Fawley, alongside her husband, who had predeceased her in 1992.

== Opera libretti ==
- The Turn of the Screw, Benjamin Britten, 14 September 1954, Teatro La Fenice, Venice (based on The Turn of the Screw by Henry James)
- Owen Wingrave, Benjamin Britten, 16 May 1971, BBC Television (based on a short story by Henry James)
- Death in Venice, Benjamin Britten, 16 June 1973, Aldeburgh Festival, Snape, Suffolk (based on 1912 novella Der Tod in Venedig by Thomas Mann)
- Easter, Malcolm Williamson
- What the Old Man Does is Always Right, Alun Hoddinott, 1977
- The Rajah's Diamond, Alun Hoddinott, 1979
- The Trumpet Major, Alun Hoddinott, 1981

== Play ==
- The Seducer, play in two acts, based on Søren Kierkegaard's play The Seducer’s Diary, 1843

== See also ==
- Piper family
