= Jeremy Annear =

British artist

- Born: 1949 (age 76–77); Devon, United Kingdom
- Known for: Abstract painting
- Website: jeremyannear.com

Jeremy Annear (born 1949) is an English artist, best known for his abstract paintings.

== Background ==
Annear attended Exeter College of Art in the mid-1960s. During this period, he presented his first abstract paintings in an exhibition. His work is represented by Messum's Gallery in London and Campden Gallery in Gloucestershire. Additionally, as of March 2015, his work is also represented by IdeelArt Gallery. Annear has held solo exhibitions in Cornwall, Germany, and France.

He focuses primarily on oil on board and canvas.

== Solo exhibitions ==
- At Messum's: 2023, 2022, 2020, 2018, 2016, 2013, 2011, 2009, 2002, 2000, 1998, 1997
- Lemon Street Gallery: Twofold: in Art and Life, 2015
- Campden Gallery: 2014
- Porthmeor Gallery: 1998
