= Fawley, Buckinghamshire =

Village in Buckinghamshire, England

Coordinates: 51.576°N 0.910°W

Fawley
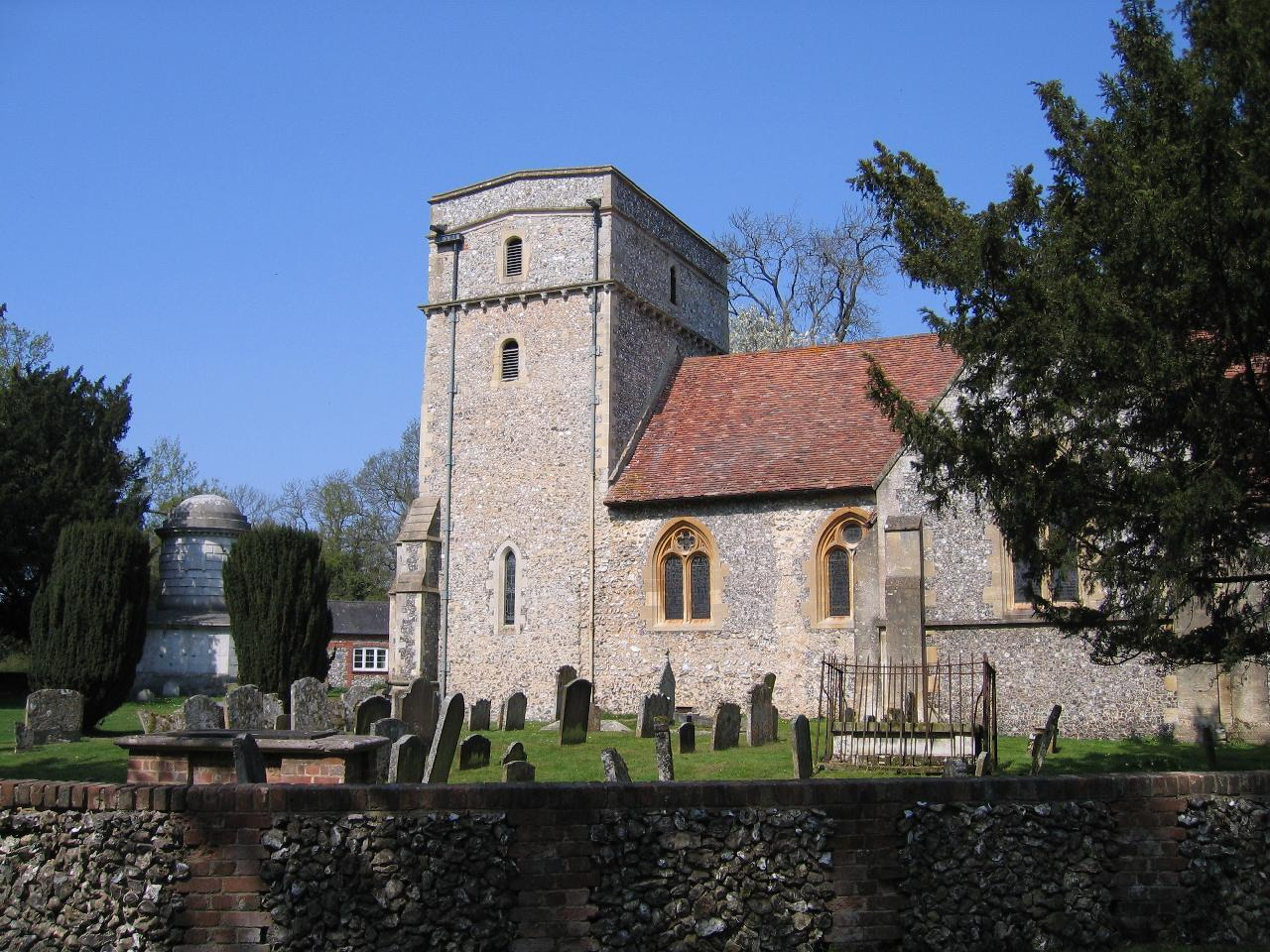
- St Mary's parish church

- Location within Buckinghamshire
- Population: 255; 258 (2011 Census)
- OS grid reference: SU7586
- Civil parish: Fawley
- Unitary authority: Buckinghamshire
- Ceremonial county: Buckinghamshire
- Region: South East
- Country: England
- Sovereign state: United Kingdom
- Post town: HENLEY-ON-THAMES
- Postcode district: RG9
- Dialling code: 01491
- Police: Thames Valley
- Fire: Buckinghamshire
- Ambulance: South Central
- UK Parliament: Wycombe

Fawley is a village and civil parish in Wycombe district in the south-western corner of Buckinghamshire, England. It is on the boundary between Buckinghamshire and Oxfordshire, about seven miles west of Great Marlow and north of Henley-on-Thames.

The village toponym is derived from the Old English for "fallow-coloured woodland clearing". It was recorded in the Domesday Book of 1086 as Falelie. There are two other places in England called Fawley.

Sir Bulstrode Whitelocke, a prominent Member of Parliament in Cromwell's day, was from Fawley. In 1642 he allowed soldiers fighting in the English Civil War to stay at the manor house in Fawley, known as Fawley Court but they were quite raucous in their behaviour and destroyed the contents of the house. In 1684 the house was redesigned, following a design by Sir Christopher Wren.

The Church of England parish church of Saint Mary the Virgin was rebuilt in 1748. It has a Tree of Life stained glass window designed by the artist John Piper (who lived nearby in Fawley Bottom) and Patrick Reyntiens.

== See also ==
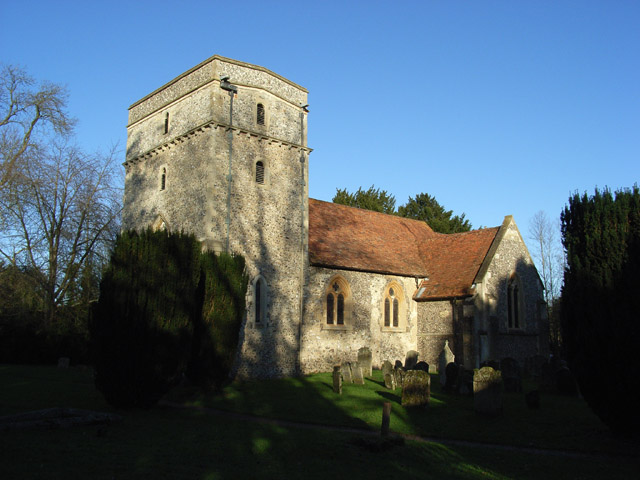
St Mary's Church, Fawley

- Fawley Bottom
- Fawley Court
