= James Dodds (artist) =

British painter and carver

- Born: 1957 (age 68–69); Brightlingsea
- Known for: painting, carving, printing, stained-glass, writing
- Website: https://jamesdodds.co.uk

James Dodds (born 1957) is an East Anglian artist whose practice centers on painting, linocut and relief carving. Born in Brightlingsea, Essex, he now lives and works in Wivenhoe producing prints and books as the Jardine Press. He is the son of East Anglian artist Andrew Dodds and has been described as "boatbuilding’s artist laureate".

== Education ==
James Dodds followed an apprenticeship as a shipwright in Maldon, Essex from 1972 to 1976. He studied at Colchester Institute from 1976 to 1977, the Chelsea School of Art from 1977 to 1980 and the Royal College of Art in London from 1981 to 1984.

== Works ==
Dodds exhibits regularly at Bircham Contemporary Arts Gallery (Holt, Norfolk), Messum's Fine Art Gallery (London), Messums Wiltshire, London and Dowling Walsh Gallery (Maine USA).

His paintings and hand-made prints are inspired by boats and boat building, especially those craft peculiar to East Anglia. He had a major retrospective show, "Shipshape", at Firstsite at The Minories, Colchester in November 2001. This show subsequently toured at Whitstable, Herne Bay, Frome, Isle of Wight, Barnard Castle, National Maritime Museum Cornwall, National Maritime Museum at Greenwich, Great Yarmouth and Hartlepool. Dodds's work returned to Firstsite with a new exhibition called "Wood to Water". A timelapse film of Dodds making a large painting for this show called Timepeace is on his website.

On the 16 August 2016 Dodds received the John Nash medal from Colchester Art Society for his contribution to the arts.

His work has been purchased by Britten-Pears Library, Aldeburgh; Victoria and Albert Museum; Clacton & Rochford Hospitals; Chelmsford and Essex Museums; Ipswich Borough Council, Museums and Galleries; Colchester Borough Council; Horniman Museum, London. National Maritime Museum, Greenwich, UCS East Contemporary Art Collection; Ipswich, MMoFA, Madison, Georgia, USA; Masterworks Museum of Bermuda Art; The Sainsbury Centre, Norwich National Maritime Museum Cornwall. Wortley Hall. and many private collectors. He is better known for his dramatic linocuts of coastal towns, nautical myths and legends, as well as his large paintings of various boats.

In July 2007 Dodds received an honorary doctorate from the University of Essex in recognition of his "distinguished contribution to the local community as an artist and defender of our community and natural heritage." His style evokes the spirit of rural and maritime East Anglia with scenes of daily life and folklore. He has also conceived, illustrated and hand-produced a series of handmade artists' books.

A short film, "Shaped by the Sea", about Dodds, by Emily Harris for Classic Yacht TV was released in May 2014. Played Anthony's father in Joanna Hogg's Sundance Grand Jury winning Film The Souvenir & The Souvenir II

== Awards ==
- 1999 Awarded GMC Trust Best in Show ‘Aldeburgh Beach’
- 2007 Honorary doctorate from University of Essex.
- 2012 Ian Collins biography “James Dodds Tide Lines" wins EDP Jarrolds East Anglian Art & Photography Book Award
- 2016 John Nash medal from Colchester Art Society
- 2021 Ian Collins biography “James Dodds The Blue Boat”

== Exhibitions ==
=== Selected solo exhibitions ===
- 1984/1995/1998/2000, Aldeburgh Festival
- 1985, "Ship of Fools", Hatton Gallery, Newcastle upon Tyne
- 1986, "Fish, Flesh or Fowl", Christchurch Mansion, Ipswich
- 1989/1990/1995/1997, Printworks, Colchester
- 1989/1992/1995, Bircham Contemporary Arts, Norfolk
- 1990/1994/1995, Chappel Galleries, Essex
- 1992, Sue Rankin Gallery, London Two man show with John Bratby RA
- 2001, North House Gallery, Manningtree with John Reay "Blue Boat". University of Essex Gallery
- 2004/ 2006/ 2007/ 2009/ 2011/ 2013 /2015/ 2016/ 2017/ 2018 /2020 Messum's. Cork Street. London
- 2010/ 2012/ 2017Dowling Walsh Gallery, Rockland, Maine. USA
- 2015-2016 Wood to Water, Firstsite, Colchester
- 2019-2020 Wood to Water, National Maritime Museum Cornwall
- 2020 The Work of Human Hands, Messums Wiltshire and Cork Street London.
- 2022 Retrospective, The Yar Gallery, Gt Yarmouth
- 2021-2026 The Blue Boat, David Messum Fine Art, London.
- 2026 Look Out, Chappel Gallieries.

=== Selected group exhibitions ===
- 1991/1998/1999/2000, Royal Academy Summer Exhibition
- 1993, Wetzlar, Germany
- 1994, John Callahan Gallery, Boston, United States
- 1995, "4 from Wivenhoe". Courcoux & Courcoux, Hampshire "Ultra Marine", Liverpool "Forth, Tyne, Dogger", Brewery Arts, Cirencester
- 1996, Peter Scott Gallery, Lancaster University "The Sea", Black Swan Arts, Frome
- 1997, City Arts Gallery. Leeds Union of Artists, St. Petersburg, Russia Mall Gallery, London
- 1999, Eastern Open. King's Lynn Arts Centre, Norfolk Mystic Seaport. USA: New York Ship Terminal, United States
- 2000, The Hunting Art Prizes. London
- 2000, "Alphabet Soup". Printworks, Sudbury, Suffolk
- 2001/2003, 2006, 2007, 2008, 2009, 2010, 2011, Messum's Cork Street. London
- 2013, "Masterpieces, Art and East Anglia" Sainsbury Centre, Norwich.

== Critical reception ==
In a 2008 article for WoodenBoat magazine, Bill Mayher examined the influence of James Dodds's shipbuilding background on his paintings. Mayher noted the technical precision of Dodds's representations of wooden boats, while suggesting that the works extended beyond straightforward realism. He described how "what once seemed specific now glides toward the abstract", with individual components forming a unified composition.

In A Sea's Eye View, a foreword to a 2017 Messum's exhibition catalogue, author A. L. Kennedy explored the relationship between maritime landscapes, craftsmanship and human experience in Dodds's work. She observed that his landscapes "show a sea's-eye view", interpreting their perspective as one that places human activity within the wider maritime environment. Kennedy also discussed the relationship between the technical accuracy of his depictions and their symbolic treatment of vulnerability, history and the natural world.

Writing in Boat or Ark, an essay accompanying Dodds's 2026 exhibition Love Is a Boat at David Messum Fine Art Gallery, Ken Worpole considered the symbolic significance of boats in the artist's paintings. Worpole interpreted the vessels as representing more than their practical maritime function, describing them as a means of reaching "other worlds of hope and redemption". His commentary emphasised the relationship between the physical construction of boats and their broader symbolic associations.
