= St Mary the Virgin's Church, Fawley =

Coordinates: 51.5743°N 0.9141°W

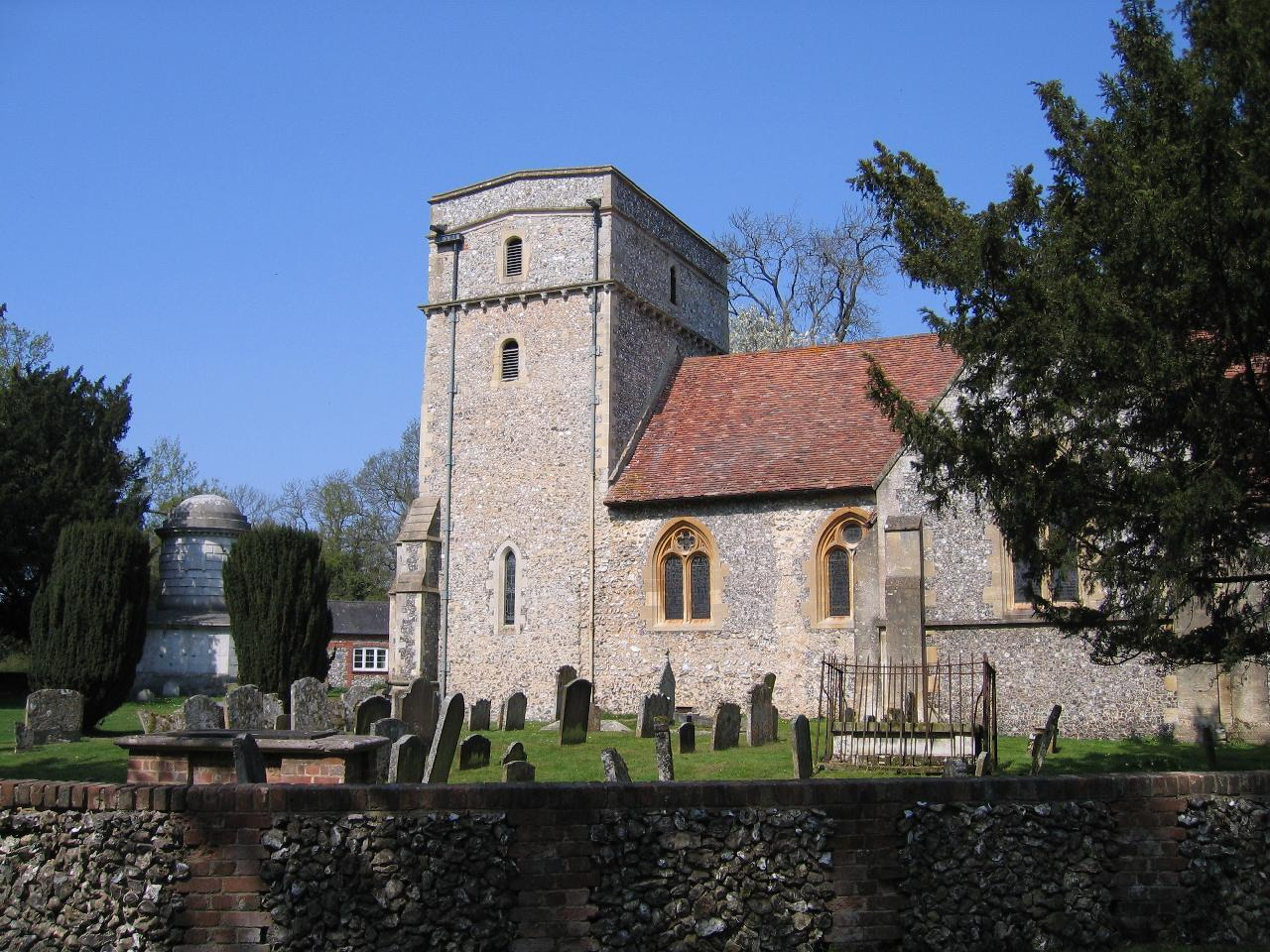
- St Mary's Church with the Freeman Mausoleum on the left

- Location in Buckinghamshire
- OS grid reference: SU 754,867
- Location: Fawley, Buckinghamshire
- Country: England
- Denomination: Anglican
- Website: St Mary, Fawley

History
- Status: Parish church
- Dedication: Saint Mary the Virgin

Architecture
- Functional status: Active
- Heritage designation: Grade II*
- Designated: 21 June 1955
- Architect: Paley and Austin (restoration)
- Architectural type: Church
- Style: Gothic, Gothic Revival

Specifications
- Materials: Flint with stone dressings Tiled roofs

Administration
- Province: Canterbury
- Diocese: Oxford
- Archdeaconry: Buckingham
- Deanery: Wycombe
- Parish: Fawley

Clergy
- Rector: Revd John Wigram

St Mary the Virgin's Church is in centre of the village of Fawley, Buckinghamshire, England. It is an active Anglican parish church on the deanery of Wycombe, the archdeaconry of Buckingham, and the diocese of Oxford. Its benefice has been united with those of five other local churches to form the benefice of Hambleden Valley. The church is recorded in the National Heritage List for England as a designated Grade II* listed building.

== History ==
The church originated in the 12th century as a simple nave and chancel. The tower was added during the following century, and raised to its present height in the 16th century. The chancel was rebuilt in 1748. In 1882–83 the church was restored and extended by the Lancaster architects Paley and Austin. This included raising the nave walls, rebuilding the tower arch, replacing the nave roof, adding a north transept, a vestry and new windows, and refacing the south transept, opening it up to the nave by adding an arch.

== Architecture ==
=== Exterior ===
St Mary's is constructed in flint with stone dressings and tiled roofs. Its plan consists of a two-bay nave, north and south transepts, a chancel with a north vestry, and a west tower. The tower has angle buttresses, and a west doorway over which is a two-light window. On the north and south sides are lancet windows. Towards the top of the tower is a moulded corbel table. There are semicircular single-light windows above and below the corbel table. At the summit of the tower is a shallow gable and a moulded parapet. Along the sides of the nave are two-light windows. In the transepts are single-light windows on the east and west sides, and two-light windows on the north and south sides. The chancel has a south blocked doorway, and a large east window. Above the east window is a plaque inscribed with a date.

=== Interior ===
In the chancel is a moulded cornice, and its east bay is decorated with Ionic pilasters. Also in the chancel is panelling that was made for Canons, near Edgware, Middlesex. the home of the Dukes of Chandos. Also from Canons are the communion rails, the pulpit and the reading desk. The marble font dates from 1884.

On west wall of south transept is elaborate marble monument with two recumbent alabaster figures, commemorating James Whitelocke and his wife Elizabeth, c.1632. In the nave is a cartouche dating from about 1718. On the inside of the tower arch are two painted texts dating from 1637.

Stained glass in the nave and transepts is by Clayton and Bell and James Powell and Sons. The main east window in the chancel is in a classical style, designed by Heaton, Butler & Bayne in 1878. It depicts the Crucifixion framed by classical patterns in yellow and gold. Elsewhere is armorial glass that was formerly in the earlier house on the site now occupied by Phyllis Court in Henley-on-Thames.

In the vestry is a memorial window to Anthony Hartley designed by John Piper and manufactured by Patrick Reyntiens. Installed in 1976, the narrow single lancet depicts Piper's familiar Tree of Life motif as a verdant vine abundant with fruit, flowers and leaves. Piper was a longtime resident of Fawley Bottom and a parishioner of St Mary's. He is buried in the churchyard.

The single-manual organ was built in 1917 by the Positive Organ Company.

== External features ==
Associated with the church and close to it are two mausolea. The Freeman Mausoleum is dated 1750 and was designed by John (Cooke) Freeman (d. 1752), of Fawley Court as a family tomb. It consists of an octagonal base on a plinth, with a rusticated drum surmounted by a dome. There is an inscription on the south face of the base, and an entrance with an iron gate on the north face. In the drum are two small oval windows. The design of the mausoleum is based on that of Cecilia Metella on the Appian Way near Rome. It has been designated as a Grade II* listed building. The Mackenzie Mausoleum is dated 1862 and was built for the Mackenzie of Fawley Court. It is constructed in Aberdeen granite, is square in plan, and has a shallow stepped pyramidal roof. On the north side is the entrance with a frieze bearing an inscription. Around the entrance are pilasters carrying a pediment, with a carved hourglass in the tympanum. The mausoleum is listed at Grade II.

== See also ==
- List of ecclesiastical works by Paley and Austin

== Gallery ==
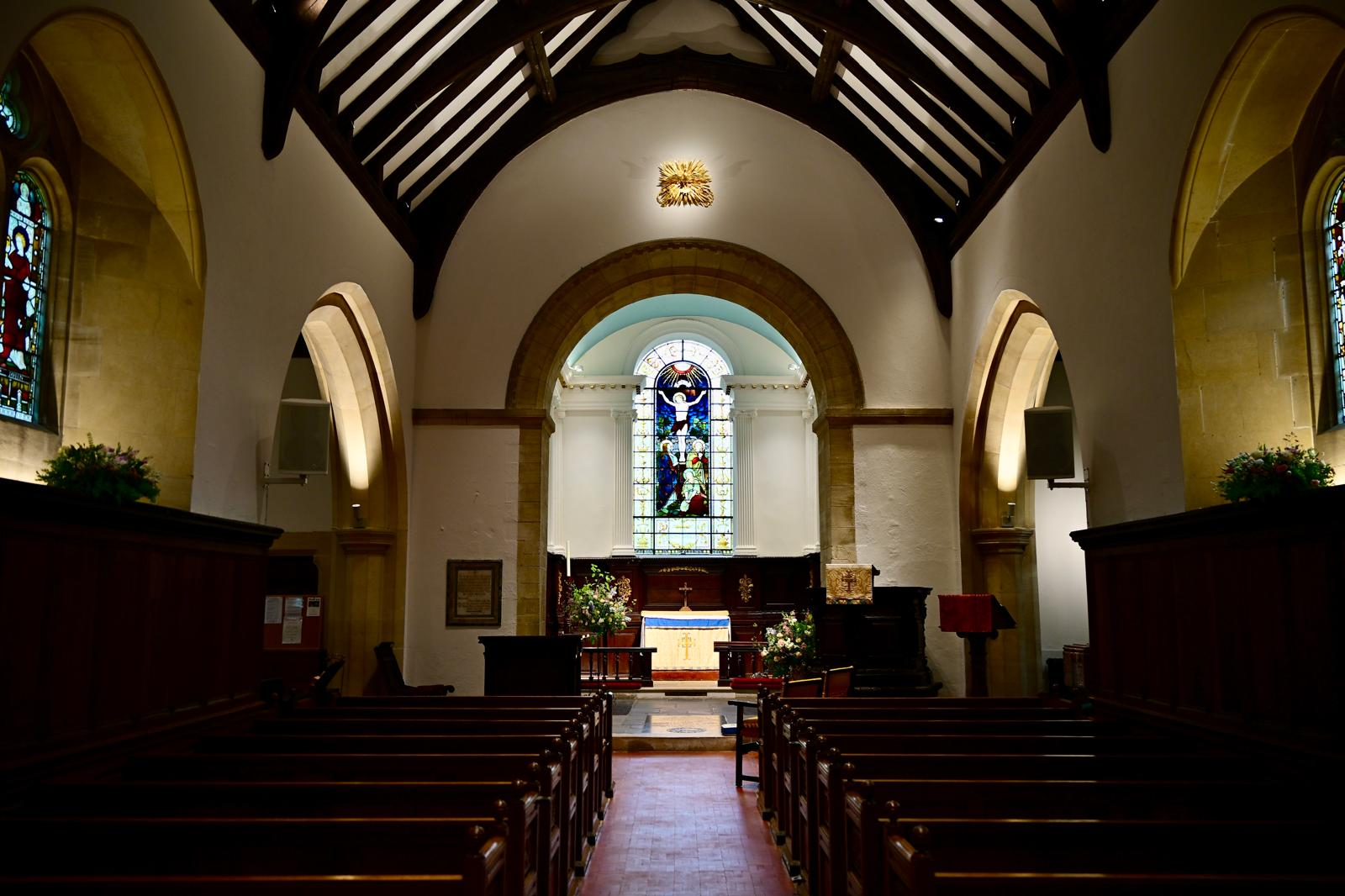
View of nave and chancel

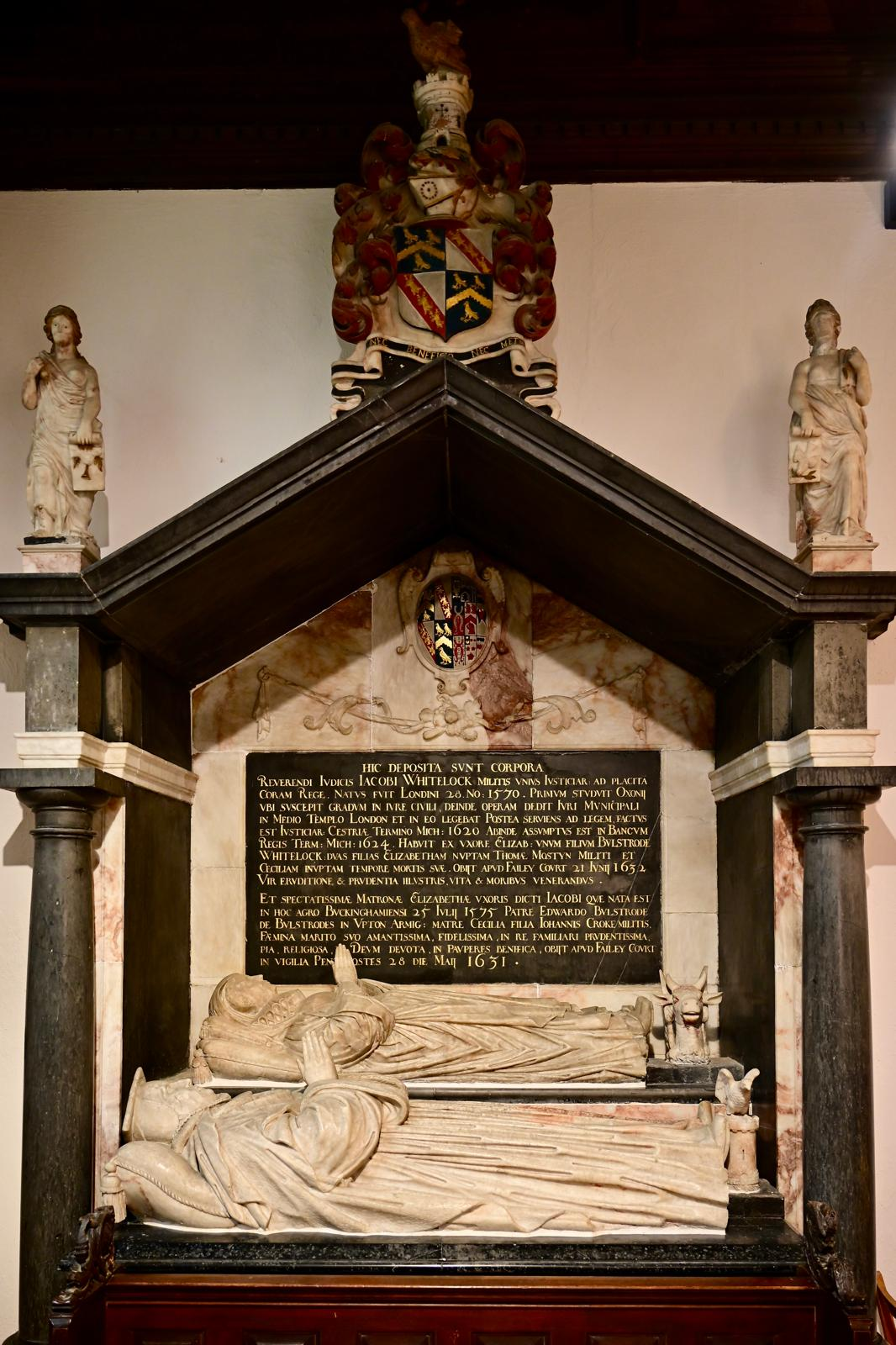
Whitelocke memorial, c.1632

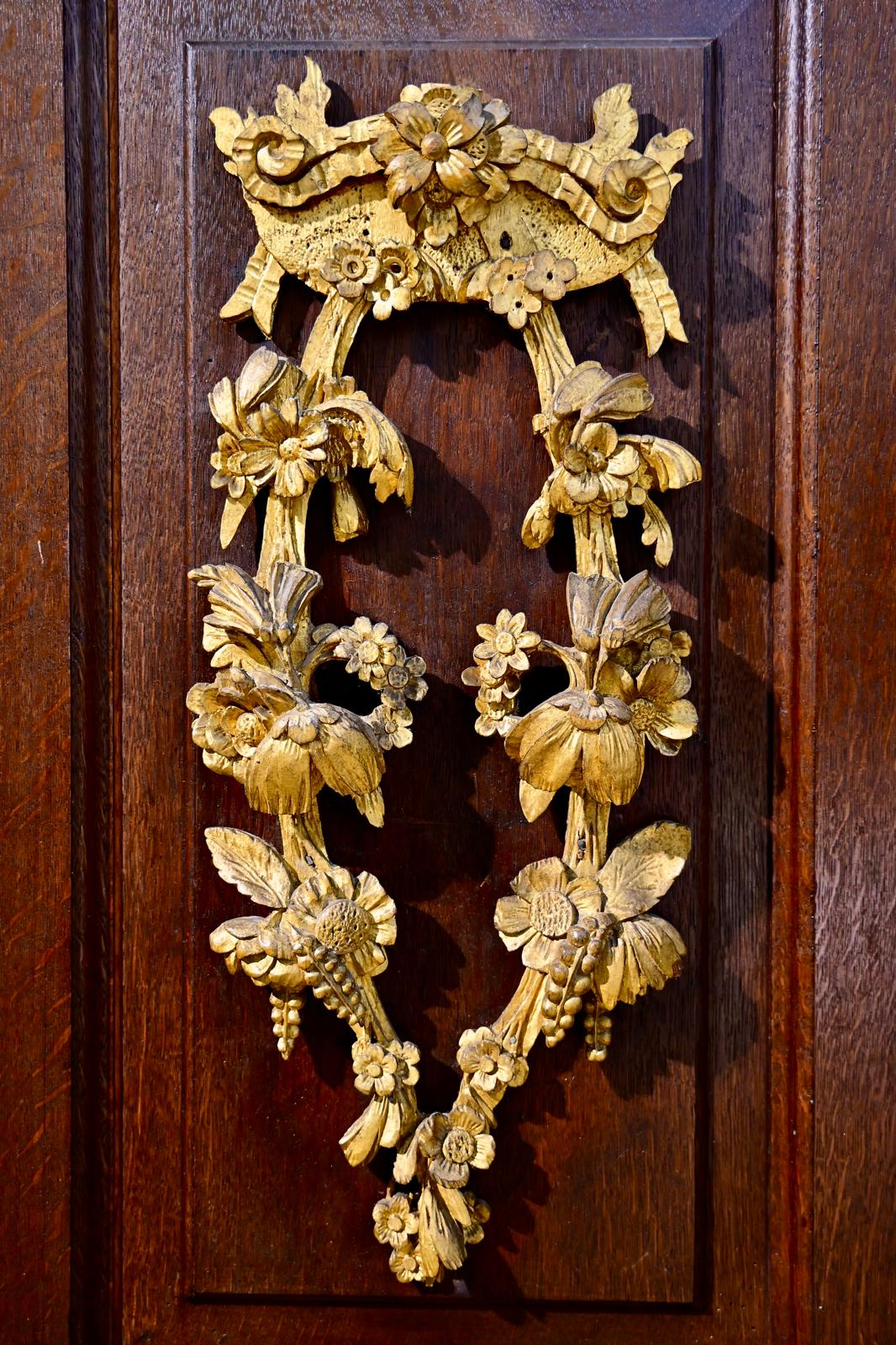
18th century wood carving in chancel

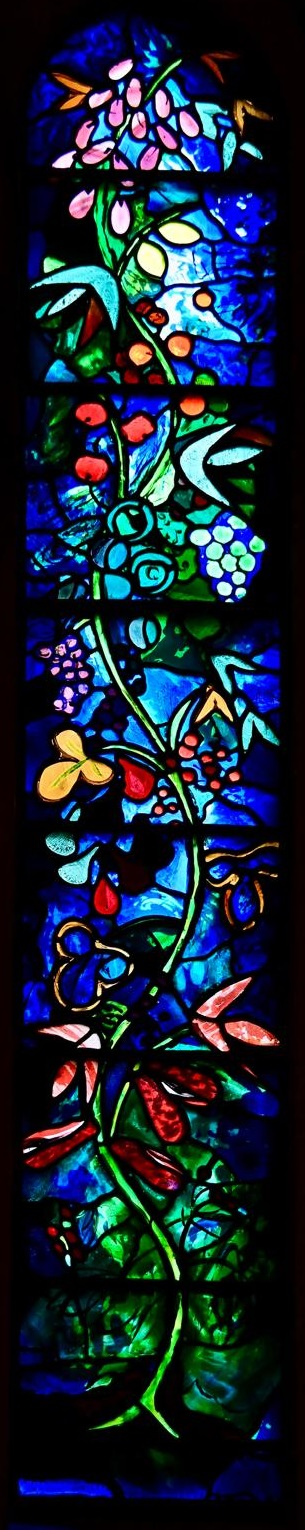
Window by John Piper

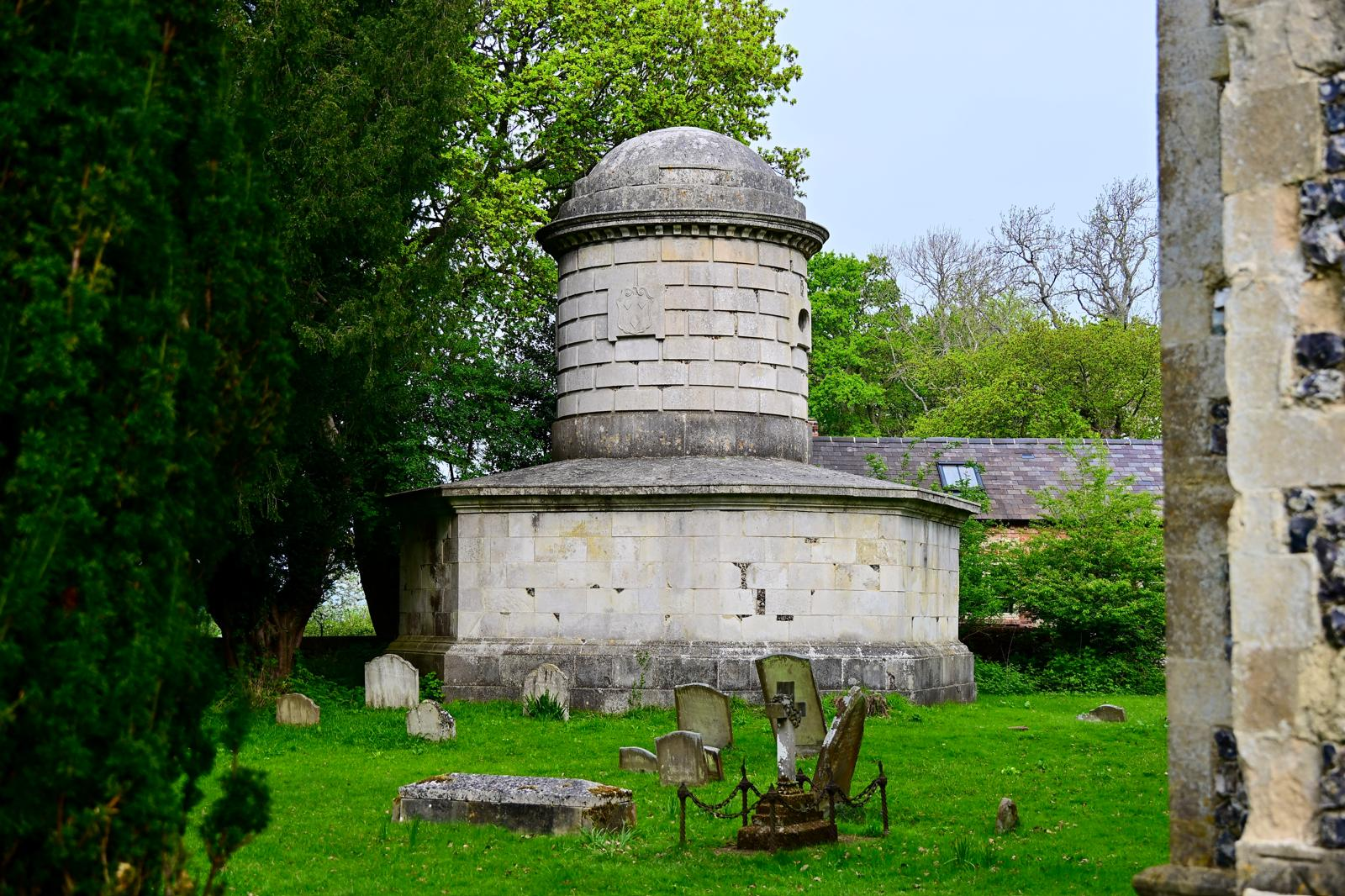
Freeman Mausoleum

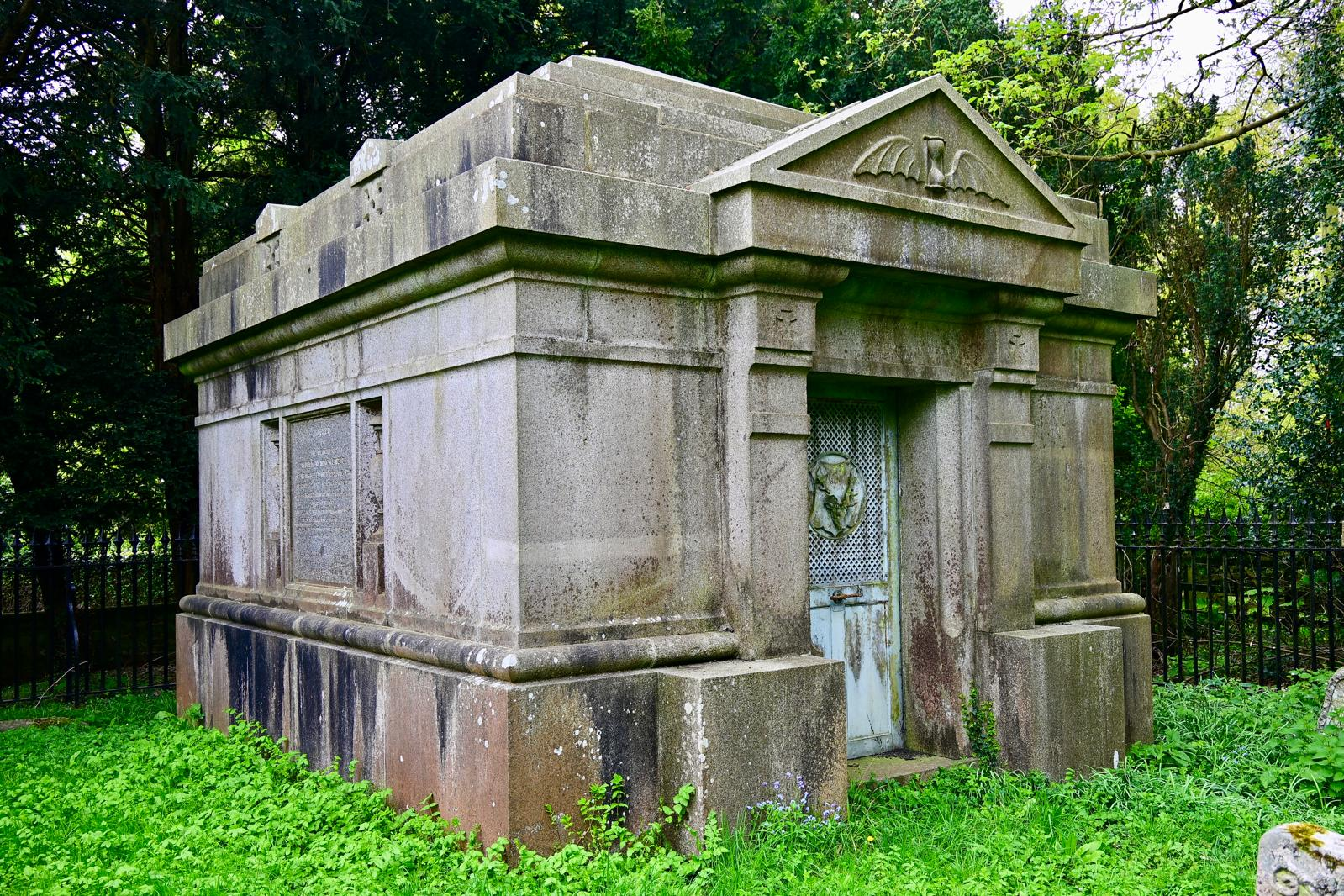
Mackenzie Mausoleum

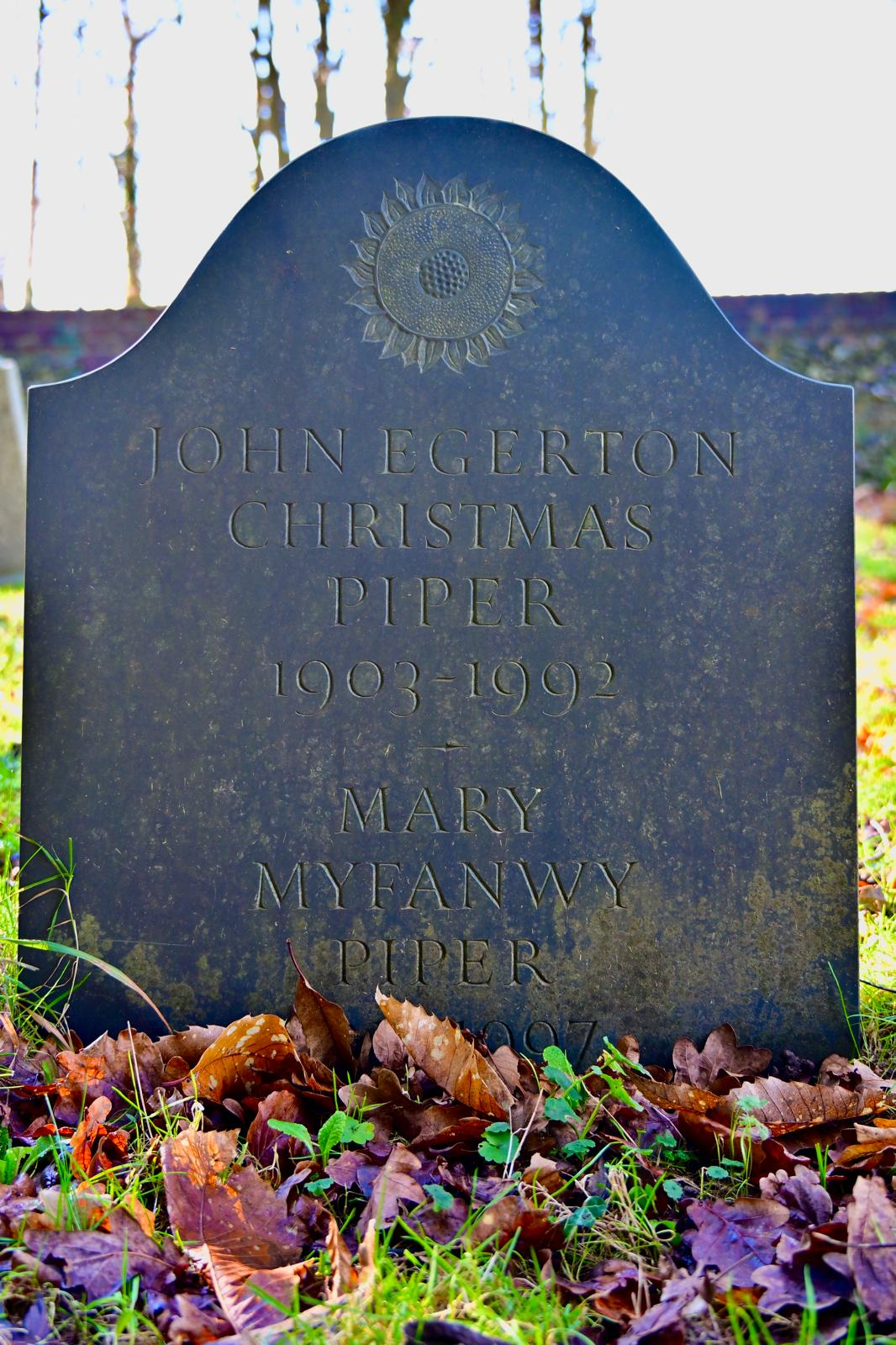
Gravestone of John Piper
