= Edward Piper =

English painter

Edward Blake Christmas Piper (1938–1990) was an English painter.

== Life and career ==
Edward Piper was the eldest son of the artist John Piper and his wife Myfanwy. He was educated at Lancing College and later studied under Howard Hodgkin at the Bath Academy of Art in Corsham and later at the Slade School of Art in London.

Piper produced photographs for the Shell County Guides and also undertook graphic design commissions to make a living. He continued on to study figurative art and painting female nudes; he later painted landscapes, in Corsica, Malta, France, Italy and Spain.

A number of Piper's lithographs and screenprints are to be found in the Tate Gallery collection.

Piper's son Luke Piper is also a painter and his younger son Henry Piper is a sculptor.

Edward Piper died in June 1990 of cancer at the age of 51.

== Books ==
- Clayton, Sylvia, Edward Piper. David & Charles, 1991. ISBN 0-7153-9913-6.
- Perry, Jenny, Edward Piper.

== See also ==
- Piper family
