= Messum's =

Art gallery in London

Coordinates: 51.5068°N 0.1384°W

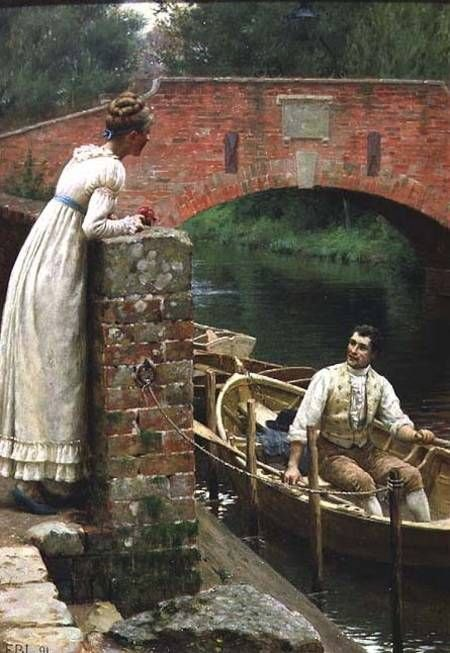
The Fond Farewell by Edmund Blair Leighton (1852–1922), exhibited at Messum's

Messum's is an arts organization based in England that includes art galleries, venues, and an online art exchange platform. The original gallery was founded in 1963 by David Messum. Its group of venues includes Messums Wiltshire, an art venue that is located inside a 13th-century tithe barn.

== History ==
David Messum Fine Art was an art gallery founded in 1963 in Bury Street, St. James's, London run by David Messum, with a branch in Marlow, Buckinghamshire. Messums staged exhibitions of British impressionism, and in 1985 David Messum's publishing company published British Impressionism: A Garden of Bright Images by Laura Wortley.

The gallery exhibits contemporary art and work by British impressionists, modern and figurative painters and sculptors. Messums has promoted the work of the early Newlyn and St Ives painters. In 2012, a proposed development in Cork Street threatened to cause Messum's to move.

In 2016, David's son, Johnny Messum, founded an art gallery based in the tithe barn at Place Farm, Tisbury, Wiltshire.

Messums.org is a nonprofit organization with a branch in London known as Messums London, with sculpture and focus on Arte Povera. They have held more than 114 exhibitions with 160 artists, mostly in London. Messums Org participated in 3 art fairs, including twice in the British Art Fair 2019 in London and once in Photo London in the UK.

== Galleries ==
Messum West is a multi-purpose gallery and arts center based in Wiltshire, England. Opened in 2016 after a two-year restoration project to bring a thirteenth-century tithe barn back as an exhibition and event space. Messums London is a refurbished 1950s exhibition space on Cork Street, run and managed by Johnny Messum and his team. Messums East, a new visual arts and cultural space, is planned to be opened in Lowestoft town center as part of a wider program of regeneration in Lowestoft. In 2019, the workings of Elizabeth Frink arrived at Messums Wiltshire with the reconstruction of Woolland studio in the historic tithe barn. The studio was rescued from collapse and revived as an exhibition space displaying works from Frink’s studio and elements of her working practice and environment.

== Artists ==
Artists who have exhibited at the gallery include William Bowyer, Peter Brown, David Chesworth, James Dodds, Rose Hilton, Kurt Jackson, Atong Atem, Edward Piper, John Piper, Elizabeth Frink,Laurence Edwards and Jeremy Annear.
