= Henley Festival =

Classical music festival in England

Henley Festival of Music and the Arts
- Dates: Early July (annually)
- Locations: Henley-on-Thames, Berkshire, England
- Years active: 1982–present
- Founders: Henley Festival Trust
- Website: henley-festival.co.uk

The Henley Festival of Music and the Arts is held, at Henley on Thames, each July, on the Berkshire bank of the River Thames, at the same spot and using adapted facilities from the Henley Royal Regatta, which is held the week before. The festival bills itself as Britain's only black tie festival.

Henley Festival is a charity. RISE by Henley Festival is its charitable initiative dedicated to supporting the next generation of musicians, visual artists and backstage professionals.

The Floating Stage, Henley Festival's main stage floats on the river and the audience use one of the grandstands with seating on the lawn in front. Allowing for an intimate audience of 4,400 in the auditorium area. Each evening it normally features a light classical music concert as a nod to its beginning as a classical festival, with jazz later in the evening. The festival also features other smaller stages, art exhibits, roving performers, outdoor restaurants, and other attractions.

== History ==
First held in 1982, the festival was created to provide a music and arts festival for the Henley on Thames community, while extending the use of the marquees and grandstands built for the annual rowing event held the previous week. The event has historically attracted approximately 25,000 attendees each year. The festival bills itself as Britain's only black tie festival, with catered fine dining and sponsors that include Moët & Chandon.

In 2010, performers at the festival included Nigel Kennedy, Bryn Terfel and Will Young. In 2013, performers at the festival included Jamie Cullum, Madness and Paloma Faith.

In 2022, the festival celebrated its 40th anniversary with headliners Sir Tom Jones, The Script, and Craig David. In 2023, performers at the festival included Rag'n'Bone Man, Westlife, Nile Rodgers & Chic, DJ Danny Rampling, and Boney M. with original lead singer Liz Mitchell.

== Charity ==
Henley Festival is a charity. Founded in 2022, RISE by Henley Festival was created as its charitable initiative in response to the growing lack of opportunities for emerging creatives. Through funding, mentoring, industry experience and performance opportunities, Henley Festival and RISE helps talented people build sustainable careers.

It also includes Early RISErs as part of the programme for local, young musicians and artists.

At Henley Festival 2026, RISE featured 16 bands and singers on its Audi Presents RISE Music Stage, supported 7 backstage production crew, and exhibited 17 emerging visual artists within the RISE Gallery.
