= Fawley Bottom =

Village in Buckinghamshire, England

Coordinates: 51.57511°N 0.92202°W

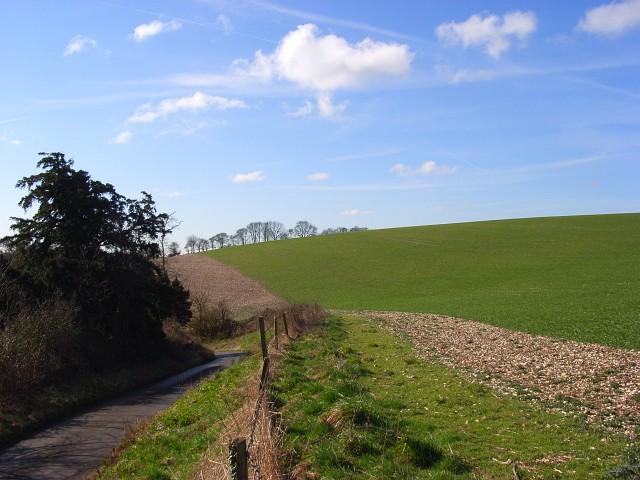
Farmland in Fawley Bottom

Fawley Bottom is a small village in south Buckinghamshire, England, north of Henley-on-Thames. It is in the civil parish of Fawley.

The artist John Piper and his wife, the librettist Myfanwy Piper, lived out their lives at Fawley Bottom Farmhouse, from the mid-1930s to the 1990s.

== See also ==
- Fawley village
- Fawley Court
