= List of Private Passions episodes (2005–2009) =

This is a list of Private Passions episodes from 2005 to 2009. It does not include repeated episodes or compilations.

== 2005 ==
Date	Guest	Composer	Title	Performer, label	
9 Jan 2005	DBC Pierre	Ludwig van Beethoven, arr. William Finnegan	Moonlight Sonata		
9 Jan 2005	DBC Pierre	Benjamin Britten	Finale (Tarantella) (from Diversions for Piano (Left Hand) and Orchestra. Op. 21)		
9 Jan 2005	DBC Pierre	Frederick Delius	"I Stand As on Some Mighty Eagle's Beak" (Songs of Farewell No. 2)		
9 Jan 2005	DBC Pierre	Harri Wessman	"Water Under Snow is Weary"		
9 Jan 2005	DBC Pierre	Gustav Holst	Prelude, Song of the Fishermen (from Japanese Suite, Op. 33)		
9 Jan 2005	DBC Pierre	Jazz Jamaica	"Theme from Exodus" (from the album Double Barrel)		
9 Jan 2005	DBC Pierre	Juventino Rosas	"Sobre las olas" (Over the Waves)		
9 Jan 2005	DBC Pierre	Franz Schubert	"Die Junge Nonne"		
9 Jan 2005	DBC Pierre	Dmitri Shostakovich	Prelude No. 24 (from 24 Preludes, Op. 34)		
9 Jan 2005	DBC Pierre	Richard Wagner	Schmerzen (No. 4 of The Wesendonk-Lieder)		
16 Jan 2005	Jon Snow	Johann Sebastian Bach	"Herr, Unser Herrscher, Dessen Ruhn" (from St John Passion		
16 Jan 2005	Jon Snow	Beethoven	Kyrie (from Missa Solemnis, Op. 123)		
16 Jan 2005	Jon Snow	Herbert Howells	Magnificat (Collegium Regale)		
16 Jan 2005	Jon Snow	Mozart	Quoniam (from Mass in C minor, K. 427)		
16 Jan 2005	Jon Snow	Francis Poulenc	"Allegro Giocoso" (from Organ Concerto)		
16 Jan 2005	Jon Snow	Sergei Prokofiev	"The Philosophers" (from Cantata for the 20th Anniversary of the October Revolution)		
16 Jan 2005	Jon Snow	Henry Purcell arr. Rees-Williams	"When I am laid in earth"		
16 Jan 2005	Jon Snow	Gioachino Rossini	Kyrie (from Petite Messe Solennelle)		
16 Jan 2005	Jon Snow	Robert Schumann	Études Symphoniques, Op. 13 (Theme and Variation 1)		
23 Jan 2005	Shena Mackay	Billie Holiday	"It's Easy to Blame the Weather"		
23 Jan 2005	Shena Mackay	Harrison Birtwistle	Tenebrae (from 3 Settings of Celan)		
23 Jan 2005	Shena Mackay	Frédéric Chopin	Mazurka in A minor, Op. 17, No. 4		
23 Jan 2005	Shena Mackay	Germaine Tailleferre	Violin Sonata No. 1 (First Movement)		
23 Jan 2005	Shena Mackay	Mabel Mercer	"If Love Were All" (Noël Coward)		
23 Jan 2005	Shena Mackay	Darius Milhaud	Le Bœuf sur le toit		
23 Jan 2005	Shena Mackay	Mozart	Eine kleine Nachtmusik (Rondo)		
23 Jan 2005	Shena Mackay	Ornette Coleman	"Lonely Woman" (from The Shape of Jazz to Come album)		
23 Jan 2005	Shena Mackay	Henry Purcell	"Thrice Happy Lovers", and "The Plaint" (from The Fairy-Queen, act 5)		
30 Jan 2005	William Hague	Bach	Concerto in D minor for Two Violins, BWV 1043 (2nd movement, Largo ma non tanto)		
30 Jan 2005	William Hague	Chopin	Prelude in C minor, Op. 28, No. 20		
30 Jan 2005	William Hague	Traditional arr. Eva Cassidy	"Wade in the Water"		
30 Jan 2005	William Hague	Gene Harris with the Ray Brown Trio	"Cry Me a River"		
30 Jan 2005	William Hague	Mozart	Piano Sonata in C minor, K. 457 (3rd Movement, Allegro assai)		
30 Jan 2005	William Hague	Sergei Rachmaninov	⋅Piano Concerto No. 3 in D minor, Op. 30 (1st movement. Allegro ma non tanto)	.	
30 Jan 2005	William Hague	Walkin' Jim Stoltz	"Wild Wind"		
6 Feb 2005	William Pye	Anouar Brahem	"Aube rouge a Grozny" (from the album Astrakan Café)		
6 Feb 2005	William Pye	Hector Berlioz	"Royal Hunt and Storm" (from The Trojans, act 4)		
6 Feb 2005	William Pye	Berlioz	Trio for 2 Flutes and Harp (L'Enfance du Christ, part 3)		
6 Feb 2005	William Pye	Johannes Brahms	Andante con Moto (2nd movement from the Piano Trio in C, Op. 87)		
6 Feb 2005	William Pye	Cesária Évora	"Corregem Irmon"		
6 Feb 2005	William Pye	Christoph Willibald Gluck	"The Dance of the Blessed Spirits" (middle section only) (from Orfeo ed Euridice, act 2)		
6 Feb 2005	William Pye	Leoš Janáček	Andante (1st movement from Mladi)		
13 Feb 2005	Josceline Dimbleby	Albinoni	Oboe Concerto in D minor, Op. 9/2 (2nd movement – Adagio)		
13 Feb 2005	Josceline Dimbleby	Henri Duparc	Chanson triste		
13 Feb 2005	Josceline Dimbleby	Jerome Kern	"Bill" (from Show Boat)		
13 Feb 2005	Josceline Dimbleby	Jerry Leiber and Mike Stoller	"I'm a Woman"		
13 Feb 2005	Josceline Dimbleby	Claudio Monteverdi	"Pur ti miro" (from L'incoronazione di Poppea, act 3)		
13 Feb 2005	Josceline Dimbleby	Giovanni Battista Pergolesi	"Cujus Animam" (from Stabat Mater)		
13 Feb 2005	Josceline Dimbleby	Henry Purcell	"The Plaint" (from The Fairy-Queen, act 5)		
13 Feb 2005	Josceline Dimbleby	Richard Strauss	Cäcilie, Op. 27/2		
13 Feb 2005	Josceline Dimbleby	Elmer Schoebel, Ernie Erdman, Billy Meyers, Gus Kahn	"Nobody's Sweetheart"		
20 Feb 2005	Alfred Latham-Koenig	Bach	Allemande (from The Partita No. 1 in B♭, BWV 825)		
20 Feb 2005	Alfred Latham-Koenig	Debussy	Intermede (from The Violin Sonata)		
20 Feb 2005	Alfred Latham-Koenig	Duparc	"La Vie Antérieure"		
20 Feb 2005	Alfred Latham-Koenig	Olivier Messiaen	"Louange à l'Immortalité de Jésus" (last movement of Quartet for the End of Time)		
20 Feb 2005	Alfred Latham-Koenig	Francis Poulenc	Cantilena (from The Flute Sonata)		
20 Feb 2005	Alfred Latham-Koenig	Francis Poulenc	"Hotel"		
20 Feb 2005	Alfred Latham-Koenig	Reynaldo Hahn	"Paysage"		
20 Feb 2005	Alfred Latham-Koenig	Schubert	Pause (from Die Schöne Müllerin)		
20 Feb 2005	Alfred Latham-Koenig	Shostakovich	Prelude & Fugue No. 1		
27 Feb 2005	Noreena Hertz	Abderrahmane Amrani	"Ya Rayah"		
27 Feb 2005	Noreena Hertz	Anonymous work	Sankanda + Bach: Lasset Uns den Nicht Zerteilen		
27 Feb 2005	Noreena Hertz	Archilei Or Cavalieri	"Dalle Più Alte Sfere" (from Intermedi Per "La Pellegrina")		
27 Feb 2005	Noreena Hertz	Leonard Cohen	"Suzanne"		
27 Feb 2005	Noreena Hertz	Mozart	"Requiem Aeternam" (from Requiem in D minor, K. 626)		
27 Feb 2005	Noreena Hertz	Giovanni Battista Pergolesi	"Stabat Mater" (Opening Duet)		
27 Feb 2005	Noreena Hertz	Pete Townshend	"Behind Blue Eyes"		
27 Feb 2005	Noreena Hertz	Rachmaninov	Piano Concerto No. 2 in C minor, Op. 18 (1st movement - Allegro moderato - Opening)		
3 Apr 2005	Anne Stevenson	Bach	Prelude and Fugue in C♯ major, BWV 848 (from The Well-Tempered Clavier, Book I)		
3 Apr 2005	Anne Stevenson	Beethoven	Sonata in A♭, Op. 110 (3rd movement – Arioso dolente)		
3 Apr 2005	Anne Stevenson	Chopin	Preludes in C♯ minor, Op. 28/10; and F major, Op. 28/23		
3 Apr 2005	Anne Stevenson	Messiaen	"Abîme des oiseaux" (opening) (from Quartet for the End of Time)		
3 Apr 2005	Anne Stevenson	Messiaen	"Louange à l'Immortalité de Jésus" (from Quartet for the End of Time)		
3 Apr 2005	Anne Stevenson	Schubert	Piano Quintet in A, D. 667 - "The Trout" (4th movement - Theme & Variations)		
3 Apr 2005	Anne Stevenson	Robert Schumann	Fürchtenmachen + Kind im Einschlummern (from Kinderszenen, Op. 15)		
3 Apr 2005	Anne Stevenson	Bach	Suite No. 5 in C minor, BWV 1011 (4th movement - Sarabande)		
10 Apr 2005	Anna Ford	Bach	Variation 14 from The Goldberg Variations		
10 Apr 2005	Anna Ford	George and Ira Gershwin	"Nice Work If You Can Get It"		
10 Apr 2005	Anna Ford	Handel	"Art Thou Troubled" (from Rodelina)		
10 Apr 2005	Anna Ford	Kate & Anna McGarrigle	"Heart Like a Wheel"		
10 Apr 2005	Anna Ford	Mozart	Sonata in D major for 2 Pianos, K. 448 (1st movement)		
10 Apr 2005	Anna Ford	Schubert	Quintet in C major, D956 (Adagio, excerpt)		
10 Apr 2005	Anna Ford	Francisco Tárrega	Adelita		
10 Apr 2005	Anna Ford	Traditional music	"Nkosi Sikelel' iAfrika" (the South African National Anthem)		
10 Apr 2005	Anna Ford	Traditional music	"Sur Ma Vie"		
10 Apr 2005	Anna Ford	Bach	Concerto in D minor for 2 Violins (1st movement)		
17 Apr 2005	Diarmaid MacCulloch	Francisco Peraza	"Medio Registro Alto Del Primer Tono"		
17 Apr 2005	Diarmaid MacCulloch	Ravel	"Chanson Hébraïque" (from Chants Populaires)		
17 Apr 2005	Diarmaid MacCulloch	Ravel	Sonatine (2nd movement - Mouvement de Menuet)		
17 Apr 2005	Diarmaid MacCulloch	S. S. Wesley	"Blessed Be the God and Father"		
17 Apr 2005	Diarmaid MacCulloch	The Ramones	"Beat On The Brat"		
17 Apr 2005	Diarmaid MacCulloch	Michael Tippett	String Quartet No. 2 (4th movement - Allegro Appassionato)		
17 Apr 2005	Diarmaid MacCulloch	Ralph Vaughan Williams	Easter (from Five Mystical Songs)		
17 Apr 2005	Diarmaid MacCulloch	Kurt Weill	"Lied des Lotterieagenten" (from Der Silbersee)		
24 Apr 2005	Thea Sharrock	Bach	Sonata in G minor for Viola da gamba and Continuo, BWV 1029 (2nd movement: Adagio)		
24 Apr 2005	Thea Sharrock	Curtis Mayfield	"Move On Up"		
24 Apr 2005	Thea Sharrock	Wilinksi	"Ain't Nobody"		
24 Apr 2005	Thea Sharrock	Hugh Masekela	"Stimela" (The Coal Train)		
24 Apr 2005	Thea Sharrock	Joni Mitchell	"Both Sides, Now"		
24 Apr 2005	Thea Sharrock	Mozart	Clarinet Quintet in A, K581 (2nd movement; Larghetto)		
24 Apr 2005	Thea Sharrock	Plaid	"Eyen" (from the album Doublefigure)		
24 Apr 2005	Thea Sharrock	Mozart	Flute Concerto in G, K313 (1st movement; Allegro Maestoso)		
1 May 2005	Gordon Baldwin	Britten	Spring Symphony (Introduction: "Shine Out")		
1 May 2005	Gordon Baldwin	John Adams	Shaker Loops ("A Final Shaking")		
1 May 2005	Gordon Baldwin	Philip Cashian	"...In The Still Hours"		
1 May 2005	Gordon Baldwin	Tigran Tahmizyan	"A Cool Wind Is Blowing"		
1 May 2005	Gordon Baldwin	Traditional music	"Raga Ahir Bhairav"		
1 May 2005	Gordon Baldwin	Traditional Japanese	Honshirabe		
8 May 2005	Deborah Moggach	Bach	Schlummert Ein (from Cantata - Ich Habe Genug, BWV 82)		
8 May 2005	Deborah Moggach	George Gershwin	"My Man's Gone Now" (from Porgy And Bess, act 1, scene 2)		
8 May 2005	Deborah Moggach	Haydn	L'Introduzione - Maestoso ed Adagio (from The Seven Last Words)		
8 May 2005	Deborah Moggach	Karen Dalton	"It Hurts Me Too"		
8 May 2005	Deborah Moggach	Mozart	Lachrimosa (from Requiem in D minor, K. 626)		
8 May 2005	Deborah Moggach	Sheryl Crow and Jeff Trott	The Book		
8 May 2005	Deborah Moggach	Shostakovich	String Quartet No. 6 in G, Op. 101 (1st movement - Allegretto)		
15 May 2005	Ashley Page	Beethoven	Piano Trio in B♭, Op. 97 ("The Archduke", first movement, opening)		
15 May 2005	Ashley Page	Brian Eno	"Baby's On Fire"		
15 May 2005	Ashley Page	King Crimson	"Easy Money"		
15 May 2005	Ashley Page	Kurt Weill	Overture (from The Threepenny Opera, act 1)		
15 May 2005	Ashley Page	Sergei Prokofiev	Piano Concerto No. 5 (4nd movement, Larghetto)		
15 May 2005	Ashley Page	Arnold Schoenberg	Heimweh (Nostalgia from Part 3 of Pierrot Lunaire, Op. 21)		
15 May 2005	Ashley Page	Stravinsky	"Petrushka's Cell" (from Petrushka)		
15 May 2005	Ashley Page	Tchaikovsky	The Nutcracker (Transformation music from act 1)		
22 May 2005	Esbjörn Svensson	Arvo Pärt	Cantus in Memory of Benjamin Britten		
22 May 2005	Esbjörn Svensson	Bach	Cello Suite No. 2 in D minor - Prelude		
22 May 2005	Esbjörn Svensson	Béla Bartók	Piano Concerto No. 2 - Second Movement		
22 May 2005	Esbjörn Svensson	Luis Bacalov - Cam Srl Esterno Mediterraneo	Il Postino Theme from the film soundtrack Il Postino		
22 May 2005	Esbjörn Svensson	Radka Toneff and Steve Dobrogosz	"Nature Boy"		
22 May 2005	Esbjörn Svensson	Esbjorn Svensson and Dan Berglund and Magnus Öström	"A Picture Of Doris Travelling With Boris"		
22 May 2005	Esbjörn Svensson	Traditional music	"Wayfaring Stranger"		
29 May 2005	Humphrey Burton	Leonard Bernstein	"The Great Lover Displays Himself" (1st of 3 Dance Episodes from On The Town)		
29 May 2005	Humphrey Burton	George Gershwin	"One Of These Mornings...Oh Dere's Somebody Knockin at the Door" (Porgy And Bess, II, IV)		
29 May 2005	Humphrey Burton	Joseph Kosma, arr. R. Sund	"Les Feuilles mortes"		
29 May 2005	Humphrey Burton	Milhaud	Scaramouche (Third movement, Brazileira)		
29 May 2005	Humphrey Burton	Mozart	Piano Concerto in D minor, K. 466		
29 May 2005	Humphrey Burton	Francis Poulenc	C (the first of Deux Pomes De Louis Aragon)		
29 May 2005	Humphrey Burton	Schubert	Auf Der Bruck, D853		
29 May 2005	Humphrey Burton	Verdi	Requiem (end of The Libera Me)		
29 May 2005	Humphrey Burton	Wagner	Götterdämmerung (end of act 2)		
29 May 2005	Humphrey Burton	William Walton	Tango-Pasadoble (from Façade)		
12 Jun 2005	Sir Nicholas Grimshaw	Bach	The Goldberg Variations (Variations 1 & 2)		
12 Jun 2005	Sir Nicholas Grimshaw	Britten	Peter Grimes (Look!, The Storm Cone, act 1, acene 1)		
12 Jun 2005	Sir Nicholas Grimshaw	Antonín Dvořák	Piano Quintet in A major, Op. 81 (Scherzo: Furiant Molto Vivace)		
12 Jun 2005	Sir Nicholas Grimshaw	Haydn	The Creation (from Part 1, Recitative: Im Anfange; and Aria With Chorus: Nun Schwanden)		
12 Jun 2005	Sir Nicholas Grimshaw	Ibrahim Ferrer	Silencio (Rafael Hernandez)		
12 Jun 2005	Sir Nicholas Grimshaw	Robert Schumann	Piano Quintet in E♭, Op. 44 (part of 1st movement, Allegro Brilliante)		
12 Jun 2005	Sir Nicholas Grimshaw	Thomas Adès	"These Premises Are Alarmed"		
12 Jun 2005	Sir Nicholas Grimshaw	Bach	Violin Concerto in E, BWV 1042 (2nd movement, Adagio)		
19 Jun 2005	Nigel Tully	Bach	Ricercar No. 1 From The Musical Offering		
19 Jun 2005	Nigel Tully	Berlioz	Symphonie Fantastique (A Witches' Sabbath 5th movement, extract)		
19 Jun 2005	Nigel Tully	Bruckner	Symphony No. 7 in E major, Adagio 2nd movement (extract)		
19 Jun 2005	Nigel Tully	Charlie Parker	"A Night in Tunisia"		
19 Jun 2005	Nigel Tully	John Coltrane	Giant Steps		
19 Jun 2005	Nigel Tully	Miles Davis	"All Blues" (from Kind Of Blue)		
19 Jun 2005	Nigel Tully	Mose Allison	"The Seventh Son" (Willie Dixon)		
19 Jun 2005	Nigel Tully	Tim Garland	"Round Midnight" (Thelonious Monk, Cootie Williams)		
26 Jun 2005	Emily Young	Beethoven	String Quartet in A minor, Op. 132 (from the 3rd movement: "Holy Song of Thanksgiving to the Godhead from a Convalescent")		
26 Jun 2005	Emily Young	Brian Eno	"Bell Studies For the Clock of the Long Now"		
26 Jun 2005	Emily Young	Clare Hudman	"Where The Sun Will Never Go Down"		
26 Jun 2005	Emily Young	Carlo Gesualdo	Tenebrae for Good Friday (In Monte Oliveti, Responsorium 1)		
26 Jun 2005	Emily Young	Chjami Aghjalesi	Introitu		
26 Jun 2005	Emily Young	Michael Nyman	The Upside-Down Violin (Part 3)		
26 Jun 2005	Emily Young	Traditional Roumanian Folk Song	"Ballada Miorita" (Ballad of the Little Ewe Lamb)		
26 Jun 2005	Emily Young	Schubert	Sonata in B♭, D960		
26 Jun 2005	Emily Young	Shaggy	"Oh Carolina" (radio version)		
26 Jun 2005	Emily Young	Simon Jeffes	"Rosasolis"		
3 Jul 2005	Fergal Keane	Georges Bizet	"Au fond du temple saint" (The Pearl Fishers, act 1)		
3 Jul 2005	Fergal Keane	Chopin	Nocturne in E minor, Op. 72, No. 1		
3 Jul 2005	Fergal Keane	Handel	"Let the Bright Seraphim" (from Samson)		
3 Jul 2005	Fergal Keane	John Field	Nocturne No. 1 in E♭ major		
3 Jul 2005	Fergal Keane	Michael O'Suilleabhain	"The Plains of Boyle" (from the album The Dolphin's Way)		
3 Jul 2005	Fergal Keane	Giacomo Puccini	"Ah! Manon mi tradisce" (Manon Lescaut, act 2)		
3 Jul 2005	Fergal Keane	Solomon Linda	"Mbube"		
3 Jul 2005	Fergal Keane	The Voice Squad	"The Parting Glass"		
3 Jul 2005	Fergal Keane	Turlough O'Carolon	Carolan's Concerto		
10 Jul 2005	Stephen Venables	Bach	"Et Expecto Resurrectionem" (from The Credo, Mass in B minor)		
10 Jul 2005	Stephen Venables	Brahms	Trio in E♭ for Violin, Horn and Piano, Op. 40 (Scherzo)		
10 Jul 2005	Stephen Venables	Bertolt Brecht and Kurt Weill	"Surabaya Jonny" (from Happy End)		
10 Jul 2005	Stephen Venables	Dudley Moore	"And the Same to You" and "Colonel Bogey" (from Beyond The Fringe)		
10 Jul 2005	Stephen Venables	Elgar	Symphony No. 1 in A♭, Op. 55 (from The Finale)		
10 Jul 2005	Stephen Venables	Gabriel Fauré	Cantique de Jean Racine		
10 Jul 2005	Stephen Venables	Mozart	"Deh Vieni" (from The Marriage of Figaro, act 4)		
10 Jul 2005	Stephen Venables	Jean-Philippe Rameau	"Les Tendres plaintes" (from Suite in D minor, from Pièces De Clavecin)		
10 Jul 2005	Stephen Venables	Richard Strauss	Elektra (The Final Dance)		
10 Jul 2005	Stephen Venables	Robert Schumann	"Die Alten, Bösen Lieder" (last song from Dichterliebe, Op. 48)		
17 Jul 2005	Don Paterson	Antonio Carlos Jobim	"Inutil Paisagem"		
17 Jul 2005	Don Paterson	Béla Bartók	String Quartet No. 1, Op. 7		
17 Jul 2005	Don Paterson	Boards Of Canada	Bocuma (from the album Music Has the Right to Children)		
17 Jul 2005	Don Paterson	Don Paterson	The Book Of Shadows		
17 Jul 2005	Don Paterson	Donal Lunny	Denis Doody's Polka/Tolka Polka		
17 Jul 2005	Don Paterson	Durufle	Introit (from The Requiem, Op. 9)		
17 Jul 2005	Don Paterson	Fennesz	"Chateau Rouge" (from the album Venice)		
17 Jul 2005	Don Paterson	John Abercrombie	Paramour (from the album Characters)		
17 Jul 2005	Don Paterson	Robert Wyatt	"Sea Song" (from the album Rock Bottom)		
17 Jul 2005	Don Paterson	Erik Satie	Nocturne No. 4 (from 5 Nocturnes)		
17 Jul 2005	Don Paterson	Savath and Savalas	"Ultimo Tren" (from the album Apropa'T)		
17 Jul 2005	Don Paterson	Kurt Weill	"Lost in the Stars" (from Lost in the Stars, from album Fairytales by Radka Toneff and Steve Dobrogosz)		
24 Jul 2005	Christopher Hampton	Bach	Concerto for Four Harpsichords, BWV 1065 (After Vivaldi) (1st movement)		
24 Jul 2005	Christopher Hampton	Bob Dylan	"One More Cup of Coffee"		
24 Jul 2005	Christopher Hampton	Brahms	Sextet in B♭, Op. 18 (opening of 1st movement - Allegro Ma Non Troppo)		
24 Jul 2005	Christopher Hampton	Juan Bautista Deambroggio	Bandoneon Arrabalero		
24 Jul 2005	Christopher Hampton	George Gershwin	"Summertime"		
24 Jul 2005	Christopher Hampton	Haydn	"Im Anfang Schuf Gott Himmel Und Erde" (from The Creation)		
24 Jul 2005	Christopher Hampton	Mozart	"Konstanze! Konstanze!" + "O wie ängstlich" (from Die Entführung aus dem Serail, act 1)		
24 Jul 2005	Christopher Hampton	Philip Glass	Secret Agent (Theme music from the film)		
24 Jul 2005	Christopher Hampton	Puccini	"O soave fanciulla" (from La bohème, act 1)		
31 Jul 2005	Miranda Richardson	Malcolm Arnold	English Dance No. 1 - Andantino (From English Dances Set 1, Op. 27)		
31 Jul 2005	Miranda Richardson	Bach	Gigue (from Suite No. 1 in G, BWV 1007)		
31 Jul 2005	Miranda Richardson	Britten	Sanctus (from War Requiem, Op. 66)		
31 Jul 2005	Miranda Richardson	Leonello Casucci and Irving Caesar and Spencer Williams and Roger Graham	"Just A Gigolo"/"I Ain't Got Nobody"		
31 Jul 2005	Miranda Richardson	Dead Can Dance	How Fortunate The Man With None (Opening)		
31 Jul 2005	Miranda Richardson	Debussy	Pelléas et Mélisande (opening of act 1)		
31 Jul 2005	Miranda Richardson	Michael Ondaatje	"Sweet Like A Crow"		
31 Jul 2005	Miranda Richardson	Cristóbal de Morales	"Parce Mihi Domine" (opening)		
31 Jul 2005	Miranda Richardson	Traditional music	"Bitter Withy"		
31 Jul 2005	Miranda Richardson	Traditional music	"My Lord What a Morning"		
7 Aug 2005	Ruth Lea	Bach	"Erbarme, Dich, Mein Gott" (from The St Matthew Passion, Part 2)		
7 Aug 2005	Ruth Lea	Béla Bartók	"Door Five" (from Duke Bluebeard's Castle)		
7 Aug 2005	Ruth Lea	Brahms	Opening of Denn Alles Fleisch, Es ist Wie Gras (from The German Requiem)		
7 Aug 2005	Ruth Lea	Britten	"The Storm" (No 4 from Four Sea Interludes from Peter Grimes)		John Dowland
7 Aug 2005	Ruth Lea	"Flow, My Tears"			
7 Aug 2005	Ruth Lea	Mozart	March and Chorus (Die Zauberflöte act 2, scene 8, final part)		
7 Aug 2005	Ruth Lea	Richard Strauss	"Frühling" (No. 1 from The Four Last Songs)		
7 Aug 2005	Ruth Lea	Tchaikovsky	Symphony No. 6 (2nd movement (in 5/4))		
7 Aug 2005	Ruth Lea	Ralph Vaughan Williams	Antiphon (No. 5 from The Mystical Songs)		
14 Aug 2005	Alwyn Lishman	Schubert	Impromptu in G♭, D. 899/3		
14 Aug 2005	Alwyn Lishman	Bach	Fugue in E♭, BWV 552 - St Anne		
14 Aug 2005	Alwyn Lishman	Boellmann	"Prière À Notre Dame" (from Suite Gothique)		
14 Aug 2005	Alwyn Lishman	Arvo Pärt	Cantus in Memory of Benjamin Britten		
14 Aug 2005	Alwyn Lishman	Philip Godfrey	"When I Am Dead, My Dearest"		
14 Aug 2005	Alwyn Lishman	Rameau	"La Poule" (from Suite in G)		
14 Aug 2005	Alwyn Lishman	Domenico Scarlatti	Sonata in E♭, K. 193		
21 Aug 2005	Katharine Kent	Armstrong & Herman	"Thank You"		
21 Aug 2005	Katharine Kent	Camille Saint-Saëns	Symphony No. 3 in C minor, Op. 78 - (last movement - Maestoso)		
21 Aug 2005	Katharine Kent	Rodgers and Hammerstein	"You'll Never Walk Alone" (from Carousel)		
21 Aug 2005	Katharine Kent	Bach	"Et incarnatus est" + "Crucifixus" (from Mass in B minor, BWV 232)		
21 Aug 2005	Katharine Kent	Chopin	Grande Valse Brillante in E♭, Op. 18		
21 Aug 2005	Katharine Kent	Gabriel Fauré	"In Paradisum" (from Requiem, Op. 48)		
21 Aug 2005	Katharine Kent	Yip Harburg and Harold Arlen	"Over the Rainbow"		
21 Aug 2005	Katharine Kent	Mozart	"Ave Verum Corpus", K. 618		
28 Aug 2005	John Wheatley	Edgard Varèse	"Poème électronique" (conclusion)		
28 Aug 2005	John Wheatley	Alexander Scriabin	"Giubiloso, Extatique" (from Preparation for the Final Mystery, Part 2) Real. Nemtin		
28 Aug 2005	John Wheatley	Anne Dudley	"Born On a Sunday" (from The Seduction of Claude Debussy)		
28 Aug 2005	John Wheatley	Vyacheslav Artyomov	"Sanctus Dominus" (from Requiem)		
28 Aug 2005	John Wheatley	Britten	"Tell Me The Truth About Love" (from Four Cabaret Songs)		
28 Aug 2005	John Wheatley	Messiaen	Turangalîla Symphony (10th movement - Final)		
28 Aug 2005	John Wheatley	Dominic Muldowney	Saxophone Concerto (3rd movement – Danses macabres)		
4 Sep 2005	Neil Jordan	Traditional arr. Percy Grainger	"Londonderry Air" ("Danny Boy")		
4 Sep 2005	Neil Jordan	Heitor Villa-Lobos	Prelude No. 2		
4 Sep 2005	Neil Jordan	Britten	Cello Suite No. 1, Op. 72 - 1st movement (Canto Primo)		
4 Sep 2005	Neil Jordan	Antonio Carlos Jobim	"Desafinado"		
4 Sep 2005	Neil Jordan	Gustav Mahler	Symphony No. 9 (opening of 4th movement - Adagio)		
4 Sep 2005	Neil Jordan	Thelonious Monk	"Straight No Chaser"		
4 Sep 2005	Neil Jordan	Arvo Pärt	Cantus in Memory of Benjamin Britten		
4 Sep 2005	Neil Jordan	Schubert	Nacht und Traüme, D. 827		
11 Sep 2005	Robin Guthrie	Andrew Guthrie	"A Warm Summer's Dub"		
11 Sep 2005	Robin Guthrie	Bach arr. Allwood	"Die mit Tränen säen" (Prelude in B♭ minor from The 48, Book 1)		
11 Sep 2005	Robin Guthrie	Beethoven	String Quartet in A minor, Op. 132 (excerpt from 3rd movement: "A Convalescent's Hymn of Thanksgiving to God, in The Lydian mode")		
11 Sep 2005	Robin Guthrie	Britten	Cantata Academica (Part 1, Numbers 1 & 2: Corale and Alla Rovescio)		
11 Sep 2005	Robin Guthrie	Haydn	Symphony No. 88 in G (Finale: Allegro Con Spirito)		
11 Sep 2005	Robin Guthrie	Lennox Berkeley	Trio For Horn, Violin and Piano, Op. 44 (1st Movement: Allegro)		
11 Sep 2005	Robin Guthrie	Billy Meyers and Jack Pettis	"Bugle Call Rag"		
11 Sep 2005	Robin Guthrie	Schubert	"Der Leiermann" (from Die Winterreise)		
11 Sep 2005	Robin Guthrie	Wagner	Das Rheingold (Prelude)		
18 Sep 2005	Sir Ernest Hall	Thomas Adès	"Darknesse Visible"		
18 Sep 2005	Sir Ernest Hall	Alban Berg	Ostinato (from Lulu Suite)		
18 Sep 2005	Sir Ernest Hall	Busoni	Cortège (No. 2 of Two Studies for Doktor Faust)		
18 Sep 2005	Sir Ernest Hall	Chopin	Sonata No. 2 in B♭ minor, Op. 35 (4th movement - Presto)		
18 Sep 2005	Sir Ernest Hall	Cole Porter	"What Is This Thing Called Love?"		
18 Sep 2005	Sir Ernest Hall	Ligeti	"L'Escalier du Diable" (from Études, Book II)		
18 Sep 2005	Sir Ernest Hall	William Walton	Symphony No. 1 (2nd movement - Presto, Con Malizia)		
25 Sep 2005	Henry Goodman	Georges Bizet	"Au fond du temple saint" (from The Pearl Fishers, act 1)		
25 Sep 2005	Henry Goodman	Jacques Brel	"Madeleine"		
25 Sep 2005	Henry Goodman	John Kander and Fred Ebb	"We Both Reached for the Gun" (from Chicago)		
25 Sep 2005	Henry Goodman	Lee Hyla and Allen Ginsberg	"Howl"		
25 Sep 2005	Henry Goodman	Oi Va Voi	"Gypsy" (from the CD Laughter Through Tears)		
25 Sep 2005	Henry Goodman	Richard Strauss	"Mir anvertraut" (Die Frau ohne Schatten, act 3)		
25 Sep 2005	Henry Goodman	Arnold Schoenberg	"Verklaerte Nacht"		
25 Sep 2005	Henry Goodman	Verdi	"Niun mi tema" (end of Otello, act 4)		
25 Sep 2005	Henry Goodman	Wynton Marsalis	"Premature Autopsies" (from CD The Majesty of the Blues)		
25 Sep 2005	Henry Goodman	John Kander and Fred Ebb	"All I Care About" (from Chicago)		
2 Oct 2005	Sheila Hancock	Beethoven	Quartet in B♭, Op. 130 (5th movement – Cavatina)		
2 Oct 2005	Sheila Hancock	Britten	Elegy (from Serenade for Tenor, Horn and Strings, Op. 31)		
2 Oct 2005	Sheila Hancock	Elgar	Piano Quintet in A minor, Op. 84 (opening of 2nd movement - Adagio)		
2 Oct 2005	Sheila Hancock	Rachmaninov	Piano Concerto No. 3 in D minor, Op. 30 (conclusion Of 3rd movement - Finale)		
2 Oct 2005	Sheila Hancock	Ravel	Piano Concerto in G (2nd movement - Adagio Assai)		
2 Oct 2005	Sheila Hancock	Stephen Sondheim	"Ladies in Their Sensitivities" (from Sweeney Todd)		
2 Oct 2005	Sheila Hancock	Tchaikovsky	Piano Concerto No. 1 in B♭ minor, Op. 23 (Conclusion of 3rd Movement)		
2 Oct 2005	Sheila Hancock	Vincent Youmans	"Tea for Two"		
9 Oct 2005	Mark Lawson	John Adams	"News Has A Kind of Mystery" (from Nixon in China, act 1, scene 1)		
9 Oct 2005	Mark Lawson	Bach	Und von der sechsten Stunde an + Wenn ich einmal soll scheiden (from St Matthew Passion)		
9 Oct 2005	Mark Lawson	Aaron Copland	The Dodger (from Old American Songs, Set I)		
9 Oct 2005	Mark Lawson	Morton Feldman	"Snow Falls" (from Three Voices)		
9 Oct 2005	Mark Lawson	Haydn	Quartet in F minor, Op. 20/5 (3rd movement - Adagio)		
9 Oct 2005	Mark Lawson	Messiaen	"Plusieurs Oiseaux des Arbres de Vie" (from Éclairs Sur L'Au-Delà...)		
9 Oct 2005	Mark Lawson	Giovanni Battista Pergolesi	"O Quam Tristis" (from Stabat Mater)		
9 Oct 2005	Mark Lawson	Robert Schumann	Cello Concerto in A minor, Op. 129 (opening of 1st movement - Nicht Zu Schnell)		
9 Oct 2005	Mark Lawson	Stephen Sondheim	"Ah! But Underneath" (from Follies)		
16 Oct 2005	Frank Johnson	Bach	"Konnen Tranen Meiner Wangen" (St Matthew Passion)		
16 Oct 2005	Frank Johnson	Béla Bartók	Music for Strings, Percussion and Celesta (1st movement, Andante Tranquillo)		
16 Oct 2005	Frank Johnson	Gluck	"Unis Des La Plus Tender Enfance" (from Iphigenie En Tauride)		
16 Oct 2005	Frank Johnson	Monteverdi	L'Incoronazione di Poppea act 2, scene 2		
16 Oct 2005	Frank Johnson	Mozart	"Quartet Andro Ramingo E Solo" (Idomeneo, act 3, scene 3)		
16 Oct 2005	Frank Johnson	Stravinsky	Scenes de Ballet (excerpt)		
16 Oct 2005	Frank Johnson	Verdi	Il Lacerato Spirito Orchestral Postlude Only (from Simon Boccanegra Prologue)		
16 Oct 2005	Frank Johnson	Wagner	"Immer ist Undank Loges Lohn!" (from Das Rheingold Scene 2)		
23 Oct 2005	David Gentleman	Albinoni	Concerto in D minor, Op. 9, No. 2 (II. Adagio)		
23 Oct 2005	David Gentleman	Bach	Sonata in B minor, BWV 1030 (III. Presto)		
23 Oct 2005	David Gentleman	Billie Holiday	"Miss Brown To You" (Robin, Whiting, Rainger)		
23 Oct 2005	David Gentleman	Britten	"Dawn" (The First Sea Interlude from Peter Grimes)		
23 Oct 2005	David Gentleman	Mozart	"Ah guarda, sorella" (duet from Così fan tutte act 1, Scene 2)		
23 Oct 2005	David Gentleman	Ravel	Concerto in G major (II. Adagio Assai)		
23 Oct 2005	David Gentleman	Richard Strauss	Arabella (duet from act 2, "Und du wirst mein Gebieter sein")		
23 Oct 2005	David Gentleman	Domenico Scarlatti	Sonata in D minor, Kk9 (The Pastoral)		
23 Oct 2005	David Gentleman	Schubert	String Quartet No. 15 in G major, D. 887 (II. Andante Un Poco Moto)		
30 Oct 2005	Diana Quick	Arvo Pärt	"Für Alina"		
30 Oct 2005	Diana Quick	Baaba Maal	"Njilou"		
30 Oct 2005	Diana Quick	Bach	"Schlummert Ein, Ihr Matten Augen" (from Ich Habe Genug, BWV 82)		
30 Oct 2005	Diana Quick	Erroll Garner	"Misty"		
30 Oct 2005	Diana Quick	Marvin Gaye	"I've Got My Music"		
30 Oct 2005	Diana Quick	James MacMillan	"I Would Like to Try To Remove the Pain from This World" (from Busqueda)		
30 Oct 2005	Diana Quick	Jonathan Harvey	"Mortuos Plango, Vivos Voco"		
30 Oct 2005	Diana Quick	Schubert	Quartet in D minor, D. 810 - Death and the Maiden		
30 Oct 2005	Diana Quick	Verdi	"Dio! Mi Potevi Scagliar" (from Otello, act 3)		
6 Nov 2005	Chris Patten	Anonymous work	"Veni Creator Spiritus"		
6 Nov 2005	Chris Patten	Beethoven	"Mir ist so wunderbar" (from Fidelio, act 1)		
6 Nov 2005	Chris Patten	Cesária Évora	Petit Pays		
6 Nov 2005	Chris Patten	Handel	"Pompe vano di morte" + "Dove sei" (from Rodelinda, act 1, scene 6)		
6 Nov 2005	Chris Patten	Haydn	Benedictus (from Nelson Mass, Hob. Xxii:11)		
6 Nov 2005	Chris Patten	Haydn	Cello Concerto in C, Hob. Viib:1 (2nd movement - Adagio)		
6 Nov 2005	Chris Patten	Hoagy Carmichael	"Riverboat Shuffle"		
6 Nov 2005	Chris Patten	William Shield	"When William At Eve" (from Rosina)		
13 Nov 2005	Patrick Leigh Fermor	Traditional arr. Britten	"The Salley Gardens"		
13 Nov 2005	Patrick Leigh Fermor	Michael Berkeley	Variations on Greek Folk Songs		
13 Nov 2005	Patrick Leigh Fermor	Berlioz	"The Young Capulets Leaving the Ball" (Romeo et Juliette, Part 2)		
13 Nov 2005	Patrick Leigh Fermor	François Couperin	"La Tromba"		
13 Nov 2005	Patrick Leigh Fermor	Debussy	"Gigues" (from Images)		
13 Nov 2005	Patrick Leigh Fermor	Irving Berlin	"Let's Face the Music and Dance"		
13 Nov 2005	Patrick Leigh Fermor	Mozart	"Vedrai carina" (from Don Giovanni act 2, scene 1)		
13 Nov 2005	Patrick Leigh Fermor	Schubert	Quintet in A, D667 The Trout (Variations 4th movement)		
13 Nov 2005	Patrick Leigh Fermor	Tomás Luis De Victoria	Responsorium Ix: Seniores Populi (from The Tenebrae Responsories for Maundy Thursday)		
13 Nov 2005	Patrick Leigh Fermor	Mozart	Sinfonia Concertante in E♭, K364 (Presto Finale)		
20 Nov 2005	Branford Marsalis	Billie Holiday	"Stormy Blues"		
20 Nov 2005	Branford Marsalis	Brahms	Wie Lieblich Sind Deine Wohnungen, Herr Zebaoth		
20 Nov 2005	Branford Marsalis	John Coltrane	Pursuance Part 3 from A Love Supreme		
20 Nov 2005	Branford Marsalis	Mahler	"Ich Bin der Welt Abhanden Gekommen"		
20 Nov 2005	Branford Marsalis	Messiaen	"Regard de la Vierge" from Vingt Regards sur L'Enfant - Jesus		
20 Nov 2005	Branford Marsalis	Sidney Bechet	"China Boy"		
20 Nov 2005	Branford Marsalis	Stravinsky	"Birth Of Apollo" from Apollon Musagète		
27 Nov 2005	Sally Potter	Bach	Aria (from Goldberg Variations, BWV 988)		
27 Nov 2005	Sally Potter	Beethoven	Diabelli Variations, Op. 120 (Variation 2 – Poco Allegro)		
27 Nov 2005	Sally Potter	Henry Cowell	Anger Dance		
27 Nov 2005	Sally Potter	Lewis Allan	"Strange Fruit"		
27 Nov 2005	Sally Potter	Lindsay Cooper	"Elegy"		
27 Nov 2005	Sally Potter	Carlos Paredes	"Valsa"		
27 Nov 2005	Sally Potter	Astor Piazzolla	Libertango		
27 Nov 2005	Sally Potter	Osvaldo Pugliese	"La Yumba"		
27 Nov 2005	Sally Potter	Sapo Perapaskero arr. Golijov	"Turceasca"		
27 Nov 2005	Sally Potter	Schubert	Erlkönig, D. 328		
27 Nov 2005	Sally Potter	Traditional music	"De-Ar Fi Lumea De Hartie" (opening)		
11 Dec 2005	Raymond Baxter	Bach	"Wachet Auf, Ruft Uns Die Stimme" (opening Chorus of the Cantata, BWV 140)		
11 Dec 2005	Raymond Baxter	Bizet	"Au fond du temple saint" (from Les pêcheurs de perles, act 1)		
11 Dec 2005	Raymond Baxter	Norman Tucker	"Tuba Tune"		
11 Dec 2005	Raymond Baxter	Hubert Parry	"I Was Glad"		
11 Dec 2005	Raymond Baxter	Quintette du Hot Club de France (Bernie, Pinkard, Carsey)	"Sweet Georgia Brown"		
11 Dec 2005	Raymond Baxter	Ralph Vaughan Williams	Fantasia on Greensleeves		
11 Dec 2005	Raymond Baxter	William Walton	Spitfire Prelude & Fugue (from The First of the Few)		

== 2006 ==
Date	Guest	Composer	Title	Performer, label
8 Jan 2006	Prunella Scales	Berlioz	Roman Carnival Overture, Op. 9	
8 Jan 2006	Prunella Scales	Antonín Dvořák	Sonatina in G, Op. 100 (1st movement - Allegro Risoluto)	
8 Jan 2006	Prunella Scales	Handel	"Dopo Notte" (from Ariodante, act 3, scene 9)	
8 Jan 2006	Prunella Scales	J. J. Johnson and Leo Parker	"Wee Dot"	
8 Jan 2006	Prunella Scales	Oscar Straus	"Je Ne Suis Pas Ce Que l'On Pense" (from Les Trois Valses)	
8 Jan 2006	Prunella Scales	Schubert	Wohin? (from Die Schöne Müllerin, D. 795)	
8 Jan 2006	Prunella Scales	Stanford	Beati Quorum Via	
8 Jan 2006	Prunella Scales	Wagner arr. Wright	Prelude to Lohengrin, act 3	
8 Jan 2006	Prunella Scales	Wilbye	"Adieu Sweet Amarillis"	
15 Jan 2006	Paul Griffiths	Debussy	"Clair De Lune" (Fêtes Galantes, First Set, No. 3)	
15 Jan 2006	Paul Griffiths	Guillaume Dufay	"Agnus Dei" (Mass Se La Face Ay Pale)	
15 Jan 2006	Paul Griffiths	Giraut de Bornelh	"Reis Glorios"	
15 Jan 2006	Paul Griffiths	Kurtág	"Farewell"	
15 Jan 2006	Paul Griffiths	Kurtág	In Memoriam Joannis Pilinszky (Kafka Fragments, Part IV, No. 6)	
15 Jan 2006	Paul Griffiths	Ligeti	"Bittersweet" (from With Pipes, Drums, Fiddles, No. 6)	
15 Jan 2006	Paul Griffiths	Ligeti	Parrot (With Pipes, Drums, Fiddles, No. 7)	
15 Jan 2006	Paul Griffiths	Mozart	"S'altro che lacrime per lui non tenti" (La clemenza di Tito, act 2, scene 12)	
15 Jan 2006	Paul Griffiths	Luigi Nono	Tarde (España En El Corazon, No. 1)	
15 Jan 2006	Paul Griffiths	Stravinsky	"When Daisies Pied" (Three Songs From William Shakespeare, No. 3)	
22 Jan 2006	Michael Symmons Roberts	Gavin Bryars	"Jesus' Blood Never Failed Me Yet"	
22 Jan 2006	Michael Symmons Roberts	James MacMillan	Veni Veni Emmanuel (Transition: Sequence II and Coda: Easter)	
22 Jan 2006	Michael Symmons Roberts	John Adams	"Harmonium"	
22 Jan 2006	Michael Symmons Roberts	Jonathan Cape	Reading: Food For Risen Bodies Vi (from Corpus,)	
22 Jan 2006	Michael Symmons Roberts	Jonathan Cape	Reading: The Frequency (From Corpus)	
22 Jan 2006	Michael Symmons Roberts	Marc Brown and Nina Miranda	"Underwater Love"	
22 Jan 2006	Michael Symmons Roberts	Messiaen	"Force et Agilite des Corps Glorieux" (from Les Corps Glorieux)	
22 Jan 2006	Michael Symmons Roberts	Mozart	"Ruhe Sanft, Mein Holdes Leben" (from Zaide)	
22 Jan 2006	Michael Symmons Roberts	Rautavaara	Cantus Articus (Concerto for Birds and Orchestra) (3rd movement Swans Migrating)	
5 Feb 2006	Rebecca Front	Britten	"This Little Babe" from Ceremony of Carols	
5 Feb 2006	Rebecca Front	Brahms	3rd movement from Symphony No. 3 in F major	
5 Feb 2006	Rebecca Front	George Gershwin	3rd movement from Piano Concerto in F major	
5 Feb 2006	Rebecca Front	Henry Purcell	"Dido's Lament" from Dido & Aeneas	
5 Feb 2006	Rebecca Front	Mahler	2nd movement from Symphony No. 2 'Resurrection'	
5 Feb 2006	Rebecca Front	Mozart	2nd Movement from Concerto For Flute, Harp and Orchestra K299	
12 Feb 2006	James May	Britten	"The Old Lute" from Songs From the Chinese Op. 58	
12 Feb 2006	James May	Bach	"Corrente and Double" from Partita No. 1 in B minor, BWV 1002	
12 Feb 2006	James May	Chopin	Prelude No. 24 in D minor	
12 Feb 2006	James May	François Couperin	Les Baricades Mistérieuses	
12 Feb 2006	James May	John Dunstable	"Quam Pulcra Es"	
12 Feb 2006	James May	Lennox Berkeley	"Allegro Moderato" from Sonatina for Flute and Piano	
12 Feb 2006	James May	Messiaen	"Amen de la Création" from Visions de L'Amen	
12 Feb 2006	James May	N/A	Top Gear Theme Tune	
12 Feb 2006	James May	Bach	Toccato in G minor, BWV 915	
19 Feb 2006	Alexander McCall Smith	Anonymous work 14th-century English	"De Spineto Nata Rosa"	
19 Feb 2006	Alexander McCall Smith	Arvo Pärt	Cantus in Memoriam Benjamin Britten	
19 Feb 2006	Alexander McCall Smith	John Walter Bratton and Jimmy Kennedy	"The Teddy Bears' Picnic"	
19 Feb 2006	Alexander McCall Smith	Foday Musa Suso	Tilliboyo (Sunset)	
19 Feb 2006	Alexander McCall Smith	Mozart	"Soave sia il vento" (Così fan tutte, act 1)	
19 Feb 2006	Alexander McCall Smith	Peter Maxwell Davies	"Lullabye For Lucy"	
19 Feb 2006	Alexander McCall Smith	Philip Glass	"To The Sea" (Part IV of Itaipu)	
19 Feb 2006	Alexander McCall Smith	Thomas Morley	"In Nets Of Golden Wires"	
26 Feb 2006	Dr. Tim Brain	Bach	"Et Expecto" (from Mass in B minor, BWV 232)	
26 Feb 2006	Dr. Tim Brain	Elgar	"Profiscere, Anima Christiana" + "Go In The Name of Angels and Archangels" (from The Dream of Gerontius, Op. 38)	
26 Feb 2006	Dr. Tim Brain	Gerald Finzi	Aria (from Farewell To Arms, Op. 9)	
26 Feb 2006	Dr. Tim Brain	Orlando Gibbons	"This Is The Record of John"	
26 Feb 2006	Dr. Tim Brain	Handel	"For Unto Us A Child Is Born" (from Messiah)	
26 Feb 2006	Dr. Tim Brain	Monteverdi	Pur Ti Miro, Pur Ti Stringo (from L'Incoronazione Di Poppea)	
26 Feb 2006	Dr. Tim Brain	Giovanni Pierluigi Da Palestrina	Matin Responsary	
26 Feb 2006	Dr. Tim Brain	Ralph Vaughan Williams	Clun (from On Wenlock Edge)	
26 Feb 2006	Dr. Tim Brain	Ralph Vaughan Williams	Symphony No. 8 in D minor (4th movement - Toccata)	
5 Mar 2006	Zubin Varla	Harold Arlen and Yip Harburg	"Over the Rainbow"	
5 Mar 2006	Zubin Varla	Bach	Suite No. 4 in E♭, BWV 1010 (4th movement - Sarabande)	
5 Mar 2006	Zubin Varla	Chopin	Nocturne in C♯ minor, Op. 27/1	
5 Mar 2006	Zubin Varla	Joe Zawinul	"74 Miles Away"	
5 Mar 2006	Zubin Varla	Mahler	Symphony No. 9 (extract from 4th movement - Adagio)	
5 Mar 2006	Zubin Varla	Robert Schumann	"Schöne Wieger Meiner Leiden" (from Liederkreis, Op. 24)	
5 Mar 2006	Zubin Varla	Shostakovich	Symphony No. 5, Op. 47 (opening of 3rd movement - Largo)	
12 Mar 2006	Sir Alan Budd	Bach	Crucifixus + Et resurrexit (from Mass in B minor, BWV 232)	
12 Mar 2006	Sir Alan Budd	Beethoven	Sonata in F, Op. 24 - "Spring" (3rd movement – Scherzo)	
12 Mar 2006	Sir Alan Budd	Leoš Janáček	Mĺadí (1st movement - Allegro)	
12 Mar 2006	Sir Alan Budd	Kenneth Leighton	"God's Grandeur"	
12 Mar 2006	Sir Alan Budd	Mozart	Trio in E♭, K. 498 - "Kegelstatt" (1st movement - Andante)	
12 Mar 2006	Sir Alan Budd	Francis Poulenc	"O Magnum Mysterium" (from Quatre Motets Pour le Temps de Noël)	
12 Mar 2006	Sir Alan Budd	S. S. Wesley	"Ye Are The Blessed of the Lord"	
12 Mar 2006	Sir Alan Budd	Schubert	"Auf Dem Flusse" (from Winterreise, D. 911)	
12 Mar 2006	Sir Alan Budd	Tomás Luis De Victoria	"Ascendens Christus"	
19 Mar 2006	Chick Corea	Alexander Scriabin	Prelude No. 2 in C♯ minor	
19 Mar 2006	Chick Corea	Art Tatum	"Get Happy"	
19 Mar 2006	Chick Corea	Béla Bartók	1st movement from Concerto for Orchestra	
19 Mar 2006	Chick Corea	Chick Corea	The Three Ghouls - Parts 1 & 2	
19 Mar 2006	Chick Corea	Duke Ellington	"In a Sentimental Mood"	
19 Mar 2006	Chick Corea	Mozart	1st movement from Symphony No. 40 in G minor, K. 550	
19 Mar 2006	Chick Corea	Paco De Lucia	Zyryab	
26 Mar 2006	David Rothenberg	Alan Hovhaness	And God Created Great Whales	
26 Mar 2006	David Rothenberg	Bach arr. Coleman	"Bach Prelude" from Tone Dialling	
26 Mar 2006	David Rothenberg	Dave Holland	"Conference of the Birds"	
26 Mar 2006	David Rothenberg	David Rothenberg	Trio Menura	
26 Mar 2006	David Rothenberg	David Rothenberg	"White-Crested Laugh"	
26 Mar 2006	David Rothenberg	Felix Mendelssohn	Scherzo from Trio No. 2 in C minor	
26 Mar 2006	David Rothenberg	Messiaen	First movement from Quartet for the End of Time	
26 Mar 2006	David Rothenberg	Ram Saran Nepali	"The Butterflies of Jumla"	
26 Mar 2006	David Rothenberg	Takemitsu	"Mystere" from Visions	
26 Mar 2006	David Rothenberg	Vivaldi	1st movement from Flute Concerto No. 3 in D major Il Cardellino	
2 Apr 2006	William "Bill" Gaskill	Beethoven	Quartet in B♭, Op. 130 (4th movement – Alla danza tedesca)	
2 Apr 2006	William "Bill" Gaskill	Ben Jonson	"The Triumph"	
2 Apr 2006	William "Bill" Gaskill	Berlioz	"Villanelle" (from Les Nuits d'Été, Op. 7)	
2 Apr 2006	William "Bill" Gaskill	Big Bill Broonzy	"Willie Mae"	
2 Apr 2006	William "Bill" Gaskill	Haydn	Sonata in D, Hob. XVi/42 (1st movement - Andante Con Espressione)	
2 Apr 2006	William "Bill" Gaskill	Leoš Janáček	Quartet No. 1 - "Kreutzer Sonata" (1st movement - Adagio. Con Moto)	
2 Apr 2006	William "Bill" Gaskill	Mozart	Piano Concerto in D minor, K. 466 (opening of 2nd movement - Romance)	
2 Apr 2006	William "Bill" Gaskill	Stravinsky	Les Noces (2nd Tableau)	
2 Apr 2006	William "Bill" Gaskill	Kurt Weill	"Seeräuberjenny" (from Die Dreigroschenoper)	
9 Apr 2006	Joe Boyd	Harry Akst and Sam M. Lewis and Joe Young	Dinah	
9 Apr 2006	Joe Boyd	Bach	Partita No. 1 in B♭, BWV 825 (1st movement - Prelude)	
9 Apr 2006	Joe Boyd	Esteban Celedonio Flores	"Mano A Mano"	
9 Apr 2006	Joe Boyd	Toots Hibbert	"Six and Seven Books of Moses"	
9 Apr 2006	Joe Boyd	Skip James	"I'm So Glad"	
9 Apr 2006	Joe Boyd	L. Boyer	"Les Goelands"	
9 Apr 2006	Joe Boyd	Tony Jackson and Abe Olman and Ed Rose	"Some Sweet Day"	
9 Apr 2006	Joe Boyd	Traditional music	"Saviour Pass Me Not"	
9 Apr 2006	Joe Boyd	Traditional arr. Johansson	Brudmarsch Efter Larshoga Jonke	
9 Apr 2006	Joe Boyd	Walter Donaldson	"Hallo Was Machst Du Heut, Daisy?"	
16 Apr 2006	Peter Maxwell Davies	Bach	2-Part Invention No. 7 in E minor, BWV 778	
16 Apr 2006	Peter Maxwell Davies	Béla Bartók	String Quartet No. 5 (II. Adagio Molto)	
16 Apr 2006	Peter Maxwell Davies	Leslie Sarony	"I Lift Up My Finger (and I Say 'Tweet Tweet')"	
16 Apr 2006	Peter Maxwell Davies	Monteverdi	Magnificat	
16 Apr 2006	Peter Maxwell Davies	Petrassi	Kyrie (from Goffredo Petrassi: Orchestral Works)	
16 Apr 2006	Peter Maxwell Davies	Sally Beamish	Cello Concerto, River (I. March Watercolour)	
16 Apr 2006	Peter Maxwell Davies	Schola Melurgica Della Badia Di Grottoferrata and Padre Lorenzo Tardo	"Inno Cherubico"	
16 Apr 2006	Peter Maxwell Davies	Traditional music	Italian Folk Music	
30 Apr 2006	Kate Mosse	Bach	Brandenburg Concerto No. 6 in B, BWV 1051 (3rd movement - Allegro)	
30 Apr 2006	Kate Mosse	Debussy	"La Cathédrale Engloutie" (from Preludes, Book 1)	
30 Apr 2006	Kate Mosse	Shostakovich	Symphony No. 5, Op. 47 (2nd movement - Allegretto)	
30 Apr 2006	Kate Mosse	The Doors arr. Jaz Coleman	"Spanish Caravan"	
30 Apr 2006	Kate Mosse	Traditional Persian	"The Candle and the Moth"	
30 Apr 2006	Kate Mosse	Wagner	Prelude to Parsifal, act 1 (Opening)	
30 Apr 2006	Kate Mosse	William Walton	"Thus In Babylon, the Mighty City" (from Belshazzar's Feast)	
7 May 2006	Brad Mehldau	Vincenzo Bellini	"Casta Diva" from Norma act 1	
7 May 2006	Brad Mehldau	Gabriel Fauré	"Après Un Rêve" (Op. 7, No. 1)	
7 May 2006	Brad Mehldau	John Lennon and Paul McCartney	"She's Leaving Home"	
7 May 2006	Brad Mehldau	Messiaen	"Par Lui Tout a Été Fait" from Vingt Regards Sur L'Enfant - Jésus	
7 May 2006	Brad Mehldau	Sergei Prokofiev	1st movement from Piano Sonata No. 7 in B♭ major, Op. 83	
7 May 2006	Brad Mehldau	Schnittke	Psalm No. 12 from Psalms Of Repentance	
4 Jun 2006	Patrick Malahide	Anonymous work	"Veni Creator Spiritus"	
4 Jun 2006	Patrick Malahide	Bach	Toccata in D minor, BWV 565	
4 Jun 2006	Patrick Malahide	Max Bruch	Violin Concerto No. 1 in G minor, Op. 26 (3rd movement - Allegro Energico)	
4 Jun 2006	Patrick Malahide	Chopin	Ballade No. 1 in G minor, Op. 23	
4 Jun 2006	Patrick Malahide	Liam O'Flynn	"An Droichead"	
4 Jun 2006	Patrick Malahide	Mozart	"Dies Irae" (from Requiem in D minor, K. 626)	
4 Jun 2006	Patrick Malahide	Shostakovich	Cello Concerto No. 1, Op. 107 (1st movement - Allegretto)	
4 Jun 2006	Patrick Malahide	Traditional arr. Liam O'Flynn	"The Drunken Landlady", Mckenna's Reels	
11 Jun 2006	Howard Barker	Béla Bartók	2 Popular Rumanian Dances (Stamping Dance and Buciumeana)	
11 Jun 2006	Howard Barker	Béla Bartók	Piano Concerto No. 1 (III. Allegro Molto)	
11 Jun 2006	Howard Barker	Béla Bartók	String Quartet No. 2 (III. Lento)	
11 Jun 2006	Howard Barker	Ligeti	Mysteries of the Macabre	
11 Jun 2006	Howard Barker	Shostakovich	Symphony No. 14 (The Lorelei)	
11 Jun 2006	Howard Barker	Stockhausen	Klavierstuck No. IX	
11 Jun 2006	Howard Barker	Stockhausen	Momente	
18 Jun 2006	Suzi Quatro	Beethoven	2nd movement from Piano Sonata No. 8 in C minor "Pathetique"	
18 Jun 2006	Suzi Quatro	Bob Dylan	"Stuck Inside of Mobile with the Memphis Blues Again"	
18 Jun 2006	Suzi Quatro	Dory Previn	"Mythical Kings & Iguanas"	
18 Jun 2006	Suzi Quatro	Maceo Pinkard and Doris Tauber and William Tracey (songwriter)	"Them There Eyes"	
18 Jun 2006	Suzi Quatro	Mozart	2nd movement (Adagio) from Clarinet Concerto in A K622	
18 Jun 2006	Suzi Quatro	Rachmaninov	Prelude in C♯ minor	
18 Jun 2006	Suzi Quatro	Stevie Wonder	"All in Love is Fair"	
18 Jun 2006	Suzi Quatro	Suzi Quatro	Free the Butterfly	
25 Jun 2006	Annabel Arden	Bach	4th movement (Sarabande) from Partita No. 1 B♭ major BWV 825	
25 Jun 2006	Annabel Arden	Beethoven	Diabelli Variation No. 14	
25 Jun 2006	Annabel Arden	Georges Aperghis	Récitations for Voice Nos 11 and 14	
25 Jun 2006	Annabel Arden	Jay Arden	"Bayo's Way"	
25 Jun 2006	Annabel Arden	Jimmy Durante and Eddie Jackson	"You Got To Start Every Day With a Song"	
25 Jun 2006	Annabel Arden	Rachmaninov	Prelude To The Miserly Knight	
25 Jun 2006	Annabel Arden	Shostakovich	"Happiness" from Jewish Folk Poetry	
25 Jun 2006	Annabel Arden	Skip James	"Hard Time Killing Floor Blues"	
25 Jun 2006	Annabel Arden	Vladimir Martynov	Part 1 from Come In! for 2 Violins and String Orchestra 'Silencio'	
9 Jul 2006	Mark Rowan-Hull	Bach	Ach Herr, Lass Dein Lieb Engelein (St John Passion, The Last Chorale)	
9 Jul 2006	Mark Rowan-Hull	Britten	Colloquy and Soliloquy (The Turn of the Screw act 2, scene 1)	
9 Jul 2006	Mark Rowan-Hull	Charles Ives	The Unanswered Question	
9 Jul 2006	Mark Rowan-Hull	Leoš Janáček	"The Barn Owl Has Yet to Fly Away. . ." (from On an Overgrown Path)	
9 Jul 2006	Mark Rowan-Hull	Messiaen	"Dieu Parmi Nous" (from La Nativite Du Siegneur)	
9 Jul 2006	Mark Rowan-Hull	Messiaen	"Le Baiser de L'Enfant Jesus" (from the Vingt Regards Sur l'Enfant Jesus)	
9 Jul 2006	Mark Rowan-Hull	Miles Davis	"Generique" (from the Louis Malle film Ascenseur pour l'échafaud)	
9 Jul 2006	Mark Rowan-Hull	Queen	"Don't Stop Me Now" (Freddie Mercury)	
16 Jul 2006	Alexander Armstrong	Bach	Erbarme Dich (from St Matthew Passion, BWV 244)	
16 Jul 2006	Alexander Armstrong	Beethoven	Symphony No. 7 in A, Op. 92 (3rd movement – Presto)	
16 Jul 2006	Alexander Armstrong	Britten	Hymn to St Cecilia, Op. 27 (conclusion)	
16 Jul 2006	Alexander Armstrong	Percy French	The Emigrant's Letter	
16 Jul 2006	Alexander Armstrong	Richard Strauss	Till Eulenspiegel, Op. 28 (conclusion)	
16 Jul 2006	Alexander Armstrong	Stanford	"Nunc Dimittis" in G, Op. 81	
16 Jul 2006	Alexander Armstrong	Tommy Edmondson	"Doctor Angus"	
16 Jul 2006	Alexander Armstrong	Ralph Vaughan Williams	"The Cloud-Capp'd Towers" (from Three Shakespeare Songs)	
30 Jul 2006	Graham Williams	Béla Bartók	The Miraculous Mandarin Suite	
30 Jul 2006	Graham Williams	Eino Tamberg	Violin Concerto, Op. 64	
30 Jul 2006	Graham Williams	George Lewis with Ken Collyer's Jazzmen	"If I Ever Cease to Love"	
30 Jul 2006	Graham Williams	Górecki	Symphony No. 3 (II. Lento e Largo, excerpt)	
30 Jul 2006	Graham Williams	Jonathan Harvey	Bhakti (Movement 4)	
30 Jul 2006	Graham Williams	Mahler	Symphony No. 3	
30 Jul 2006	Graham Williams	Jean Sibelius	Nocturne (Belshazzar's Feast Suite, Op. 51)	
13 Aug 2006	John Amis	Berlioz	Air: Ah, Quand Viendra L'Instant Des Supremes Adieux (From Les Troyens, act 5, scene 1) (From Les Troyens)	
13 Aug 2006	John Amis	Britten	The Turn of the Screw (act 2, scene 3, Miss Jessel)	
13 Aug 2006	John Amis	Donald Swann	"Bilbo's Last Song"	
13 Aug 2006	John Amis	Percy Grainger	The Warriors	
13 Aug 2006	John Amis	Mozart	String Quintet in C, K515 (III. Andante, excerpt)	
13 Aug 2006	John Amis	Puccini	"In Quelle Trine Morbide" (Manon Lescaut, act 2) (from Manon Lescaut)	
13 Aug 2006	John Amis	Michael Tippett	End of Mother's Aria and Spiritual ("Steal Away") from A Child of Our Time (Part 1)	
13 Aug 2006	John Amis	Vincent Youmans	"Tea for Two" (from Tea for Two)	
13 Aug 2006	John Amis	Mozart	Symphony No. 41 in C, K551 (Jupiter) (II. Andante Cantabile, Excerpt)	
20 Aug 2006	Christopher Bradley-Hole	Arvo Pärt	Summa	
20 Aug 2006	Christopher Bradley-Hole	Beethoven	Violin Sonata in F, Op. 24, Spring (4th movement: Rondo)	
20 Aug 2006	Christopher Bradley-Hole	Guido Haazen and Traditional	Sanctus Chorale (from the Missa Luba)	
20 Aug 2006	Christopher Bradley-Hole	Monteverdi	Psalm 126: Nisi Dominus (from The Vespers of 1610)	
20 Aug 2006	Christopher Bradley-Hole	Rodolfo y Su Tipica	La Cologiala (The College Girl)	
20 Aug 2006	Christopher Bradley-Hole	Rodrigo de Ceballos	Motet: Hortus Conclusus	
20 Aug 2006	Christopher Bradley-Hole	Erik Satie	Gnossienne No. 5	
20 Aug 2006	Christopher Bradley-Hole	Vivaldi	Concerto in D For Lute and 2 Violins (3rd movement: Allegro)	
3 Sep 2006	Sara Paretsky	Bob Dylan	"Tombstone Blues"	
3 Sep 2006	Sara Paretsky	Britten	"In a Garden Shady" (from Hymn to St. Cecilia)	
3 Sep 2006	Sara Paretsky	Hugo Wolf	"In Den Schatten Meiner Locken"	
3 Sep 2006	Sara Paretsky	Mozart	"Non mi dir, bell'idol mio" (from Don Giovanni, act 2, scene 4)	
3 Sep 2006	Sara Paretsky	Nanci Griffith	"Wouldn't That Be Fine"	
3 Sep 2006	Sara Paretsky	Schubert	String Quartet in D minor, D810 Death and the Maiden (II, Andante Con Moto)	
3 Sep 2006	Sara Paretsky	The Austin Lounge Lizards	"Jesus Loves Me"	
3 Sep 2006	Sara Paretsky	Mozart	String Quartet in C, K465, The Dissonance (I, Adagio - Allegro)	
10 Sep 2006	Maureen Lipman	Leonard Bernstein	"Glitter and Be Gay" (from Candide)	
10 Sep 2006	Maureen Lipman	Max Bruch	Violin Concerto in G minor, Op. 26 (Adagio 2nd movement)	
10 Sep 2006	Maureen Lipman	Bunny Berigan	"I Can't Get Started" [Ira Gershwin/Vernon Duke]	
10 Sep 2006	Maureen Lipman	George Gershwin	"Rhapsody in Blue"	
10 Sep 2006	Maureen Lipman	Messiaen	"Amen De La Création" from Visions De L'Amen	
10 Sep 2006	Maureen Lipman	Mozart	"Der Holle Nacht" (from The Magic Flute)	
10 Sep 2006	Maureen Lipman	Astor Piazzolla	Tango Rapsodia: Adiós Nonino	Orch. Bacalov and Luis Bacalov
10 Sep 2006	Maureen Lipman	Rossini	"Una Voce Poco Fa" (from The Barber of Seville)	
17 Sep 2006	James Fleming	Bach	Suite No. 6 in D, BWV 1012 (1st movement - Prelude)	
17 Sep 2006	James Fleming	Johann Strauss I	"Radetzky March"	
17 Sep 2006	James Fleming	Tom Lehrer	"The Vatican Rag"	
17 Sep 2006	James Fleming	Camille Saint-Saëns	Le Carnaval Des Animaux (First Five Movements)	
17 Sep 2006	James Fleming	Schubert	Sonata in B♭, D. 960 (3rd movement - Scherzo - Allegro Vivace Con Delicatezza)	
17 Sep 2006	James Fleming	Shostakovich	Piano Quintet in G minor, Op. 57 (5th movement - Finale)	
17 Sep 2006	James Fleming	Alexander Scriabin	Prelude For the Left Hand	
17 Sep 2006	James Fleming	Traditional music	The Cape Breton Fiddler's Welcome To Shetland	
24 Sep 2006	Sir Robert Carnwath	Richard Blackford	Somalia - Flying Bird, Cold Aluminium (From Voices of Exile)	
24 Sep 2006	Sir Robert Carnwath	Britten	"Let Us Sleep Now" (conclusion of War Requiem, Op. 66)	
24 Sep 2006	Sir Robert Carnwath	Donizetti	"Sconsiliato! In Queste Porte Chi Ti Guida?" (from Lucia di Lammermoor, act 2)	
24 Sep 2006	Sir Robert Carnwath	Haydn	"Und Gott Schuf ... Mit Würd' Und Hoheit Angetan" (from The Creation)	
24 Sep 2006	Sir Robert Carnwath	Mozart	Duo in G, K. 423 (2nd movement - Adagio)	
24 Sep 2006	Sir Robert Carnwath	Robert Schumann	"Wenn Ich Deine Augen Seh" + "Ich Will Meine Seele Tauchen" + "Ich Grolle Nicht"	
24 Sep 2006	Sir Robert Carnwath	Serrat	"Paraules de Amor"	
24 Sep 2006	Sir Robert Carnwath	Eugène Ysaÿe	Sonata in A minor, Op. 27/2 (1st movement - Obsession)	
1 Oct 2006	Kirsty Gunn	Gregorio Allegri	Miserere	
1 Oct 2006	Kirsty Gunn	Beethoven	Piano Concerto No. 5 in E♭, Op. 73 – "Emperor"	
1 Oct 2006	Kirsty Gunn	Chopin	Prelude in E minor, Op. 28/4	
1 Oct 2006	Kirsty Gunn	Debussy	Syrinx	
1 Oct 2006	Kirsty Gunn	Antonín Dvořák	Romantic Piece, Op. 75/1	
1 Oct 2006	Kirsty Gunn	Morton Feldman	Rothko Chapel	
1 Oct 2006	Kirsty Gunn	Handel	"Where'er You Walk" (from Semele, act 2)	
1 Oct 2006	Kirsty Gunn	Mccrimmon	"Lament for the Children"	
1 Oct 2006	Kirsty Gunn	Wagner	"Wotan's Farewell" (from Die Walküre, act 3, scene 3)	
8 Oct 2006	David Farr	Abe Schwartz	"Rusishe Sher"	
8 Oct 2006	David Farr	Bach	"Erbarme Dich Mein Gott"	
8 Oct 2006	David Farr	Beethoven	String Quartet in A minor, Op. 132 (Finale: Allegro appassionato)	
8 Oct 2006	David Farr	Bessie Smith	"Send Me to the 'Lectric Chair"	
8 Oct 2006	David Farr	Charles Mingus	"Ysabel's Table Dance"	
8 Oct 2006	David Farr	Estevao Lopes Morago	"Jesu Redemptor"	
8 Oct 2006	David Farr	John Coltrane	"Alabama"	
8 Oct 2006	David Farr	Monteverdi	Versiculus and Responsorium	
8 Oct 2006	David Farr	Silvestre Revueltas	"Cancion De Cuna" (Berceuse)	
8 Oct 2006	David Farr	Taraf de Haïdouks	"Rind De Hore"	
15 Oct 2006	Joan Bakewell	Britten	"Now the Great Bear and Pleiades" (Peter Grimes act 1, scene 2)	
15 Oct 2006	Joan Bakewell	Britten	Royaute	
15 Oct 2006	Joan Bakewell	Dolly Parton	"The Beautiful Lie"	
15 Oct 2006	Joan Bakewell	Leoš Janáček	String Quartet No. 2 (Intimate Letters)	
15 Oct 2006	Joan Bakewell	Jonathan Harvey	"I Love The Lord"	
15 Oct 2006	Joan Bakewell	Mozart	Symphony No. 25 in G minor	
15 Oct 2006	Joan Bakewell	Rodgers and Hammerstein	"Oklahoma!" (from Oklahoma! act 2)	
15 Oct 2006	Joan Bakewell	Robert Schumann	Piano Concerto in A minor, Op. 54 (Finale: Allegro Vivace)	
22 Oct 2006	David Campbell	Anonymous work Gaelic	Puirt-A-Beul	
22 Oct 2006	David Campbell	Berlioz	Zaïde	
22 Oct 2006	David Campbell	John Clerk of Penicuik	"Leo Scotiae Irritatus"	
22 Oct 2006	David Campbell	Monteverdi	Amor ("Lamento Della Ninfa")	
22 Oct 2006	David Campbell	Rameau	"Entrée des Habitants de la Forêt" (from Hippolyte et Aricie, Prologue, Scene 1)	
22 Oct 2006	David Campbell	Schubert	Gretchen Am Spinnrade, D. 118	
22 Oct 2006	David Campbell	Schubert	Sonata in B♭, D. 960 (3rd movement - Scherzo)	
22 Oct 2006	David Campbell	Stravinsky	Renard	
22 Oct 2006	David Campbell	Traditional Indian	Unnamed Solo for Murali	
29 Oct 2006	Colm Tóibín	Bach	Gigue (from The Cello Suite No. 6 in D)	
29 Oct 2006	Colm Tóibín	Bizet	"Au fond du temple saint" (from The Pearl Fishers, act 1)	
29 Oct 2006	Colm Tóibín	Gabriel Fauré	"Claire De Lune"	
29 Oct 2006	Colm Tóibín	Frederick May	String Quartet in C minor	
29 Oct 2006	Colm Tóibín	Gluck	"What Is Life?"	
29 Oct 2006	Colm Tóibín	Schubert	"Litanie auf das Fest Allerseelen", D343	
29 Oct 2006	Colm Tóibín	Jean Sibelius	Illalle (Evening)	
29 Oct 2006	Colm Tóibín	Wagner	Die Walkure	
5 Nov 2006	Simon Heffer	George Butterworth	"Coming Up from Richmond" (from Love Blows As the Wind Blows)	
5 Nov 2006	Simon Heffer	George Dyson	"Sweet Thames Run Softly"	
5 Nov 2006	Simon Heffer	George Lloyd	Symphony No. 4	
5 Nov 2006	Simon Heffer	Holst	Prelude from Hammersmith - A Prelude and Scherzo for Orchestra, Op. 52	
5 Nov 2006	Simon Heffer	Hubert Parry	Symphonic Variations (Variations 18 To 22)	
5 Nov 2006	Simon Heffer	Ravel	Le Tombeau de Couperin: Prelude	
5 Nov 2006	Simon Heffer	Ralph Vaughan Williams	Symphony No. 6 in E minor (1st movement, Allegro)	
5 Nov 2006	Simon Heffer	Wagner	"Lass Ich, Liebste, Dich Hier" (from the Prelude to Götterdämmerung)	
12 Nov 2006	Tori Amos	Bach	Two Part Inventions, No. 1 in C major	
12 Nov 2006	Tori Amos	Beethoven	1st movement from Piano Sonata No. 8 in C minor "Pathetique"	
12 Nov 2006	Tori Amos	John Lennon and Paul McCartney	"Eleanor Rigby"	
12 Nov 2006	Tori Amos	Joaquín Rodrigo arr. Gil Evans	"Concierto De Aranjuez" From Sketches Of Spain	Miles Davis
12 Nov 2006	Tori Amos	Sergei Prokofiev	1st movement from Sonata No. 4, C minor	
12 Nov 2006	Tori Amos	Rachmaninov	Etude-Tableaux Op. 33, No. 8 in G minor	
12 Nov 2006	Tori Amos	Tori Amos	"Cornflake Girl"	
12 Nov 2006	Tori Amos	Tori Amos	"Gold Dust"	
19 Nov 2006	Stephin Merritt	Ela Lamblin	"Cosmo Genesis"	
19 Nov 2006	Stephin Merritt	Guy Klucevsek	"Sweet Chinoiserie"	
19 Nov 2006	Stephin Merritt	Max Matthews	"Bicycle Built for Two"	
19 Nov 2006	Stephin Merritt	N/A	"Orpheus Zither"	
19 Nov 2006	Stephin Merritt	Robert Johnson	"Where the Bee Sucks"	
19 Nov 2006	Stephin Merritt	Stephin Merritt	"It's Hard to Be the Emperor"	
19 Nov 2006	Stephin Merritt	Victor Herbert	"Ah Sweet Mysteries of Life"	
26 Nov 2006	David Gordon	William Byrd	Fantasia A 4	
26 Nov 2006	David Gordon	Leoš Janáček	String Quartet No. 2 Intimate Letters (Final movement)	
26 Nov 2006	David Gordon	Johann Strauss II arr. Arnold Schoenberg	"Roses From the South"	
26 Nov 2006	David Gordon	Messiaen	Danse de la Fureur, Pour les Sept Trompettes [6th movement, Quartet for the End of Time]	
26 Nov 2006	David Gordon	Mussorgsky	Khovanshchina Prelude: Dawn Over the River Moscow	
26 Nov 2006	David Gordon	Arnold Schoenberg	String Quartet No. 2, Op. 10	
3 Dec 2006	Neil Kinnock	Max Bruch	Violin Concerto No. 1 in G minor, Op. 26 (Finale - Allegro Energico)	
3 Dec 2006	Neil Kinnock	Bruckner	Symphony No. 4 in E♭ - Romantic (opening of 1st movement - Bewegt, Nicht Zu Schnell)	
3 Dec 2006	Neil Kinnock	Donizetti	"Una furtiva lagrima" (from L'elisir d'Amore, act 2)	
3 Dec 2006	Neil Kinnock	Johann Nepomuk Hummel	Trumpet Concerto in E (2nd movement - Andante)	
3 Dec 2006	Neil Kinnock	Puccini	"Recondita Armonia" (from Tosca, act 1)	
3 Dec 2006	Neil Kinnock	Shostakovich	Romance (from The Gadfly)	
3 Dec 2006	Neil Kinnock	Verdi	"If You Want A Faithful Lover" (from Rigoletto, act 3)	
3 Dec 2006	Neil Kinnock	Wagner arr. Fletcher	"Roman War Song" (from Rienzi)	
10 Dec 2006	Felicity Kendal	Bob Marley and The Wailers	"Jammin"	
10 Dec 2006	Felicity Kendal	Britten	Variation V "In The Bleak Midwinter" from A Boy Was Born	
10 Dec 2006	Felicity Kendal	Elgar	3rd movement (Adagio) from Cello Concerto	
10 Dec 2006	Felicity Kendal	Miles Davis	"Miles Ahead"	
10 Dec 2006	Felicity Kendal	Mozart	2nd movement from Piano Concerto No. 21 in C Kv467	
10 Dec 2006	Felicity Kendal	Puccini	"Vogliatemi Bene" from Madame Butterfly	
10 Dec 2006	Felicity Kendal	Tommaso Albinoni	3rd movement from Oboe Concerto in D minor	
10 Dec 2006	Felicity Kendal	Zakir Hussain		
24 Dec 2006	Paul Woodmansterne	Bach	"Lass, Fürstin, Lass Noch Einen Strahl" (Mourning Ode, BWV 198, First movement)	
24 Dec 2006	Paul Woodmansterne	Beethoven	Symphony No. 3 in E♭, Op. 55 ("Eroica") (Marcia funebre, 2nd movement)	
24 Dec 2006	Paul Woodmansterne	John Gardner	"Tomorrow Shall Be My Dancing Day"	
24 Dec 2006	Paul Woodmansterne	Haydn	Cello Concerto in C (2nd movement Adagio)	
24 Dec 2006	Paul Woodmansterne	Orlando Gibbons	"What Is Our Life?"	
24 Dec 2006	Paul Woodmansterne	Schubert	"Der Lindenbaum" (Winterreise No. 5)	
31 Dec 2006	Sandi Toksvig	Andrew Lloyd Webber	"Unexpected Song"	
31 Dec 2006	Sandi Toksvig	Leonard Bernstein	"I Want To Be In America" (West Side Story)	
31 Dec 2006	Sandi Toksvig	Bizet	Carmen (Overture)	
31 Dec 2006	Sandi Toksvig	Charles Strouse And Martin Charnin	"It's the Hard-Knock Life" (Annie)	
31 Dec 2006	Sandi Toksvig	Haydn	"The Heavens Are Telling" (The Creation)	
31 Dec 2006	Sandi Toksvig	Johann Strauss II	"The Blue Danube": Concert Waltz, Op. 314	
31 Dec 2006	Sandi Toksvig	Mozart	"O zittre nicht, mein lieber Sohn" (The Magic Flute, act 1)	
31 Dec 2006	Sandi Toksvig	Carl Orff	"O Fortuna" (from Carmina Burana)	
31 Dec 2006	Sandi Toksvig	Puccini	"O Mio Babbino Caro" (Gianni Schicchi)	

== 2007 ==
Date	Guest	Composer	Title	Performer, label
7 Jan 2007	Dr. Miriam Stoppard	Britten	"Dawn" (No. 1 from The Four Sea Interludes from Peter Grimes)	
7 Jan 2007	Dr. Miriam Stoppard	Cole Porter	"I've Got You Under My Skin"	
7 Jan 2007	Dr. Miriam Stoppard	Debussy	Pelléas et Mélisande (act 3, scene 1; Melisande Lets Down Her Hair)	
7 Jan 2007	Dr. Miriam Stoppard	George Gershwin	"Summertime"	
7 Jan 2007	Dr. Miriam Stoppard	Pink Floyd	"Wish You Were Here"	
7 Jan 2007	Dr. Miriam Stoppard	Puccini	"Ch'Ella Mi Creda" (La fanciulla del West, act 3)	
7 Jan 2007	Dr. Miriam Stoppard	Jean Sibelius	Violin Concerto in D minor, Op. 47	
7 Jan 2007	Dr. Miriam Stoppard	Ralph Vaughan Williams	"The Lark Ascending"	
14 Jan 2007	Charlie Higson	Cesária Évora	"Papa Joachim Paris"	
14 Jan 2007	Charlie Higson	John Barry	"Bond Below Disco Volante" from Thunderball	
14 Jan 2007	Charlie Higson	Messiaen	"Chant D'Amour 1" from Turangalila Symphonie	
14 Jan 2007	Charlie Higson	Philip Glass	Opening from Glassworks	
14 Jan 2007	Charlie Higson	Taraf De Haidouks	"Rind De Hore"	
14 Jan 2007	Charlie Higson	Traditional music	Bats'I Son Martomail (True Song Of The Church Keeper)	
14 Jan 2007	Charlie Higson	Wagner	Tristan und Isolde - "Liebestod" ("Mild und leise eie er lächelt")	
21 Jan 2007	Colin Wilson	Alban Berg	act 3, scenes 4 and 5 from Wozzeck	
21 Jan 2007	Colin Wilson	Britten	"Assign Your Prettiness to Me" from Peter Grimes act 3	
21 Jan 2007	Colin Wilson	Haydn	1st movement from String Quartet in G major	
21 Jan 2007	Colin Wilson	Howard Hanson	1st movement From Symphony No 2 (excerpt)	
21 Jan 2007	Colin Wilson	Louis Ganne	"Overture" from Les Saltimbanqes	
21 Jan 2007	Colin Wilson	Malcolm Arnold	"Allegretto", No. 3 of the Four Scottish Dances	
21 Jan 2007	Colin Wilson	Francis Poulenc	"L'Embarquement pour Cythère"	
21 Jan 2007	Colin Wilson	Sergei Prokofiev	1st movement from Symphony No. 5	
4 Mar 2007	Alex Jennings	Bach	"Schlummert Ein" (from Ich Habe Genug, BWV 82)	
4 Mar 2007	Alex Jennings	Bart Howard	"Fly Me to the Moon"	
4 Mar 2007	Alex Jennings	Britten	"The Piano" (from The Turn of the Screw, act 2)	
4 Mar 2007	Alex Jennings	Duke Ellington	"Diminuendo and Crescendo in Blue"	
4 Mar 2007	Alex Jennings	Malcolm Arnold	Concerto for Two Pianos (2nd movement - Andante Con Moto)	
4 Mar 2007	Alex Jennings	Marvin Gaye	"Mercy, Mercy Me"	
4 Mar 2007	Alex Jennings	Stravinsky	Contento Forse Vivere - Con Queste Paroline (from Pulcinella)	
4 Mar 2007	Alex Jennings	William Walton	"This Day Is Called the Feast of Crispian" (from Henry V)	
11 Mar 2007	William Dalrymple	Camille Dalmais	"Pâle Septembre"	
11 Mar 2007	William Dalrymple	Gillebert de Berneville	"De Moi Doleros Vos Chant"	
11 Mar 2007	William Dalrymple	John Tavener	"Svyati"	
11 Mar 2007	William Dalrymple	Lata Mangeshkar and Mohd Rafi	Mohabbat Ki Jhooti Kahani	
11 Mar 2007	William Dalrymple	Nusrat Fateh Ali Khan	"Tracery"	
11 Mar 2007	William Dalrymple	Stevie Wishart	Azeruz	
11 Mar 2007	William Dalrymple	The Sabri Brothers	Ya Sahib-Ul-Jamal	
11 Mar 2007	William Dalrymple	Tomás Luis de Victoria	Sanctus & Benedictus from Requiem	
18 Mar 2007	Audra McDonald	Astor Piazzolla	Concierto Para Quinteto	
18 Mar 2007	Audra McDonald	Rodgers and Hart	"I Wish I Were in Love Again" from Babes In Arms	Audra McDonald
18 Mar 2007	Audra McDonald	Chopin	Ballade No. 1 in G minor, Op. 23	
18 Mar 2007	Audra McDonald	Harold Arlen and Ted Koehler	Happy Days/"Get Happy"	
18 Mar 2007	Audra McDonald	John Adams	Hymning Slews Part II from Shaker Loops	
18 Mar 2007	Audra McDonald	Francis Poulenc	"Cavatine": 2nd movement from Sonata For Cello and Piano	
18 Mar 2007	Audra McDonald	Puccini	"Senza Mama" from Suor Angelica	
25 Mar 2007	Annalena McAfee	C. P. E. Bach	"Freye Fantasie"	
25 Mar 2007	Annalena McAfee	Federico Mompou	"Aureana Do Sil"	
25 Mar 2007	Annalena McAfee	Leoš Janáček	"The Barn Owl Has Not Flown Away" (from On an Overgrown Path Series I)	
25 Mar 2007	Annalena McAfee	Judith Weir	"Arise! Arise!"	
25 Mar 2007	Annalena McAfee	Mahler	Fourth movement Urlicht (from Symphony No. 2 in C minor Resurrection)	
25 Mar 2007	Annalena McAfee	Mike Dekle	"No Trash In My Trailer"	
25 Mar 2007	Annalena McAfee	Seán Ó Riada and Ceoltóirí Chualann	"Marcshlua Ui Neill"	
25 Mar 2007	Annalena McAfee	Traditional music	N/A	
25 Mar 2007	Annalena McAfee	Traditional music	"Sliabh Geal gCua"	
1 Apr 2007	Clemency Burton-Hill	Angélique Kidjo	Malaïka	
1 Apr 2007	Clemency Burton-Hill	Bach	2nd movement from Concerto for two Violins in D minor	
1 Apr 2007	Clemency Burton-Hill	Beethoven	Piano Trio in D minor, Op. 70, No. 1 ("Ghost"), 1st movement	
1 Apr 2007	Clemency Burton-Hill	Leonard Bernstein	"Somewhere" from West Side Story	
1 Apr 2007	Clemency Burton-Hill	Durufle	"Ubi Caritas" from Four Motets Op. 10	
1 Apr 2007	Clemency Burton-Hill	Miles Davis	"Flamenco Sketches"	
1 Apr 2007	Clemency Burton-Hill	Mozart	"Soave Sia Il Vento" from Cosi Fan Tutte	
1 Apr 2007	Clemency Burton-Hill	Verdi	"Libera Me" from Requiem	
1 Apr 2007	Clemency Burton-Hill	Mozart	1st movement from Piano Concerto No. 21 in C major K. 467	
8 Apr 2007	Victoria Hislop	Anonymous work	"Agapi Kai Alithia"	
8 Apr 2007	Victoria Hislop	Bach	Double Concerto in D minor, BWV 1043 (1st movement - Vivace)	
8 Apr 2007	Victoria Hislop	Bruckner	Symphony No. 3 in D minor (3rd movement - Scherzo - Ziemlich Schnell)	
8 Apr 2007	Victoria Hislop	Jimmy Page and Robert Plant	"Stairway To Heaven"	
8 Apr 2007	Victoria Hislop	Felix Mendelssohn	Violin Concerto in E minor, Op. 64 (2nd movement - Andante)	
8 Apr 2007	Victoria Hislop	Paco De Lucia	"Rio De La Miel"	
8 Apr 2007	Victoria Hislop	Paul Desmond	"Take Five"	
8 Apr 2007	Victoria Hislop	Reuter and Peter Bischof	"Where Do You Go" (excerpt)	
15 Apr 2007	David Rintoul	Aly Bain and Willie Hunter and Violet Tulloch	Love of the Islands	
15 Apr 2007	David Rintoul	Béla Bartók	Allegro Molto (4th movement, from Music for Strings, Percussion and Celesta)	
15 Apr 2007	David Rintoul	Charles Mingus	"Better Get Hit in Yo' Soul"	
15 Apr 2007	David Rintoul	Dominic Muldowney	Remembrance (from music for the National Theastre's production of Proust's Remembrance of Things Past)	
15 Apr 2007	David Rintoul	Michael Marra	"Frida Kahlo's Visit to the Taybridge Bar"	
15 Apr 2007	David Rintoul	Monteverdi	"Pur Ti Miro" (L'Incoronazione Di Poppea, act 3, scene 8)	
15 Apr 2007	David Rintoul	Jean Sibelius	Symphony No. 5 in E♭, Op. 82 (3rd movement)	
22 Apr 2007	Martin Rowson	Bach	"Kommt, Ihr Töchter, Helft Mir Klagen" (Opening Chorus. Part 1 of the St Matthew Passion)	
22 Apr 2007	Martin Rowson	Chopin	"Marche Funèbre" (Orch Leopold Stokowski)	
22 Apr 2007	Martin Rowson	Flanders and Swann	"The Armadillo"	
22 Apr 2007	Martin Rowson	Kurt Weill	"September Song"	
22 Apr 2007	Martin Rowson	Mussorgsky	"The Great Gate of Kiev" (from Pictures from an Exhibition)	
22 Apr 2007	Martin Rowson	Henry Purcell	March (from The Funeral Music For Queen Mary)	
22 Apr 2007	Martin Rowson	Rodgers and Hammerstein	"Do-Re-Mi" (from The Sound of Music)	
22 Apr 2007	Martin Rowson	Syd Barrett	"Dark Globe"	
29 Apr 2007	Vernon Bogdanor	Bach	Prelude from Partita No. 1 in B♭ major BWV 825	
29 Apr 2007	Vernon Bogdanor	Beethoven	2nd movement from Sonata in F♯ major, Op. 78	
29 Apr 2007	Vernon Bogdanor	Bruckner	Coda To Slow movement - Symphony No. 8 in C minor	
29 Apr 2007	Vernon Bogdanor	Frederick Delius	"I Stand As on Some Mighty Eagle's Beak" (Songs Of Farewell)	
29 Apr 2007	Vernon Bogdanor	Sergei Prokofiev	1st movement from Symphony No. 6 in E♭	
29 Apr 2007	Vernon Bogdanor	Schubert	2nd movement from Unfinished Sonata No. 15 in C major D840 'Reliquie'	
29 Apr 2007	Vernon Bogdanor	Shostakovich	Prelude and Fugue in A major, No. 7	
29 Apr 2007	Vernon Bogdanor	Wagner	"Gesegnet sei, du reiner, durch das Reine!" from act 3 Parsifal	
6 May 2007	Kenneth Cranham	Britten	"Hymn To St Cecilia" (excerpt)	
6 May 2007	Kenneth Cranham	Britten	"Western Union Boy's Song" (from Paul Bunyan, act 1, scene 1)	
6 May 2007	Kenneth Cranham	Doris Akers	"Lead Me, Guide Me"	
6 May 2007	Kenneth Cranham	Jimmy Yancey	"Mournful Blues"	
6 May 2007	Kenneth Cranham	Kate McGarrigle	(Talk to Me Of) Mendocino	
6 May 2007	Kenneth Cranham	Mississippi John Hurt	"Richland Woman Blues"	
6 May 2007	Kenneth Cranham	Mozart	Clarinet Quintet, K. 581 (2nd movement - Larghetto)	
6 May 2007	Kenneth Cranham	Sergei Prokofiev	"Montagues and Capulets" (opening) (from Romeo and Juliet)	
6 May 2007	Kenneth Cranham	Sam Mayo	"Things Are Worse in Russia"	
6 May 2007	Kenneth Cranham	W. C. Handy	"St Louis Blues"	
13 May 2007	Mark Ravenhill	Beethoven	"Prisoners' Chorus" – Fidelio (finale, act 1)	
13 May 2007	Mark Ravenhill	Brecht and Hanns Eisler	Hollywood Elegie Nr 7' From 'Hollywood Songbook'	
13 May 2007	Mark Ravenhill	Britten	Interlude IV "Passacaglia" from Peter Grimes	
13 May 2007	Mark Ravenhill	John Adams	"I Am the Wife of Mae Tse-Tung" from Nixon in China	
13 May 2007	Mark Ravenhill	Jacques Offenbach	"You've Gone Too Far" from Orpheus In The Underworld	
13 May 2007	Mark Ravenhill	Stephen Sondheim	"I Never Do Anything Twice" from Side By Side By Sondheim	
13 May 2007	Mark Ravenhill	Verdi	"Ah! Più non ragiono!" (act 3 - Rigoletto)	
20 May 2007	James Lovelock	Cy Coleman and Carolyn Leigh	"Witchcraft"	
20 May 2007	James Lovelock	Leoš Janáček	String Quartet No. 1 The Kreutzer Sonata (I. Adagio - Con Moto)	
20 May 2007	James Lovelock	Mozart	Clarinet Concerto in A, Kv 622 (III. Rondo: Allegro)	
20 May 2007	James Lovelock	Verdi	"Nei giardin del bello" (from Don Carlo act 1)	
20 May 2007	James Lovelock	Wagner	"Nun achte wohl und lass mich seh'n (from Parsifal, act 1)	
20 May 2007	James Lovelock	Mozart	"Et Incarnatus Est" (from the Mass in C minor, Kv 427)	
27 May 2007	Liz Calder	Astor Piazzolla	Adiós Nonino	
27 May 2007	Liz Calder	Chico Buarque	"Samba Do Grande Amor"	
27 May 2007	Liz Calder	Frederick Delius	"On Hearing the First Cuckoo In Spring"	
27 May 2007	Liz Calder	João Gilberto	"Chega de Saudade"	
27 May 2007	Liz Calder	Kathleen Ferrier	"I Know Where I'm Going"	
27 May 2007	Liz Calder	Shostakovich	1st movement from Symphony No. 5	
27 May 2007	Liz Calder	Heitor Villa-Lobos	"O Trenzinho Caipira" ("The Little Country Train")	
27 May 2007	Liz Calder	Heitor Villa-Lobos	Aria From Bachianas Brasileiras No. 5	
3 Jun 2007	David Yallop	Beethoven	String Quartet in A minor, Op. 132 (III. Canzona di ringraziamento, Molto adagio)	
3 Jun 2007	David Yallop	Elgar	Symphony No. 1 in A♭ major, Op. 55 (first movement: Andante)	
3 Jun 2007	David Yallop	George Butterworth	"The Banks Of Green Willow"/"A Shropshire Lad"	
3 Jun 2007	David Yallop	Gregorian Chant	"Panis Angelicus"	
3 Jun 2007	David Yallop	John Field	Nocturne No. 1 in E♭ major	
3 Jun 2007	David Yallop	Felix Mendelssohn	String Quartet No. 1 in E♭ major, Op. 12 (I. Adagio non troppo - Allegro non tardante)	
10 Jun 2007	Gyles Brandreth	Amy Beach	2nd movement from Piano Quintet in F♯ minor, Op. 67	
10 Jun 2007	Gyles Brandreth	Charles Trenet	"Que Reste-t-il De Nos Amours?"	
10 Jun 2007	Gyles Brandreth	Gilbert And Sullivan	"Conceive Me If You Can" from Patience	
10 Jun 2007	Gyles Brandreth	Liszt	Excerpt from 1st movement of Faust Symphony	
10 Jun 2007	Gyles Brandreth	Felix Mendelssohn	"Dance of the Clowns" from A Midsummer Night's Dream	
10 Jun 2007	Gyles Brandreth	Mozart	3rd movement from Piano Concerto No. 21 in C major K467	
10 Jun 2007	Gyles Brandreth	N/A	"Most Potent, Grave, and Reverend Signiors..."	
10 Jun 2007	Gyles Brandreth	Sir Hubert Parry	"Dear Lord and Father of Mankind"	
10 Jun 2007	Gyles Brandreth	Stephen Sondheim	"With So Little to Be Sure Of"	
17 Jun 2007	David Harsent	Albert Ayler	"For John Coltrane" (excerpt)	
17 Jun 2007	David Harsent	Beethoven	String Quartet in A minor, Op. 132 (III. Canzona di ringraziamento, Molto adagio)	
17 Jun 2007	David Harsent	Billie Holiday	"Fine & Mellow" (1957 version)	
17 Jun 2007	David Harsent	Harrison Birtwistle	Gawain's Epilogue & Coda (from Gawain)	
17 Jun 2007	David Harsent	Britten	Dirge (from Serenade For Tenor, Horn and Strings, Op. 31)	
17 Jun 2007	David Harsent	Elgar	Symphony No. 1 in A♭ major, Op. 55 (First movement: Andante)	
17 Jun 2007	David Harsent	George Butterworth	"The Banks of Green Willow"/"A Shropshire Lad"	
17 Jun 2007	David Harsent	Gounod	Sanctus (from The St. Cecilia Mass)	
17 Jun 2007	David Harsent	Gregorian Chant	"Panis Angelicus"	
17 Jun 2007	David Harsent	James MacMillan	"The Children" (poem by William Soutar)	
17 Jun 2007	David Harsent	John Field	Nocturne No. 1 in E♭ major	
17 Jun 2007	David Harsent	Felix Mendelssohn	String Quartet No. 1 in E♭ major, Op. 12 (I. Adagio Non Troppo - Allegro Non Tardante)	
17 Jun 2007	David Harsent	Wagner	Siegfried Idyll (opening)	
24 Jun 2007	Lenny Henry	Donizetti	"Ah! Mes Amis, Quel Jour de Fête"	
24 Jun 2007	Lenny Henry	Mark Fisher and Joe Goodwin and Larry Shay and Harry B. Smith and Ted Snyder and Francis Wheeler	"When You're Smiling"/"The Sheikh of Araby"	
24 Jun 2007	Lenny Henry	Ginastera	"Canción Al Arbol Del Olvido", Op. 3/2	
24 Jun 2007	Lenny Henry	Jerry Leiber and Mike Stoller	"Jailhouse Rock"	
24 Jun 2007	Lenny Henry	Mozart	Sonata in A, K. 331 (1st movement - Andante Grazioso)	
24 Jun 2007	Lenny Henry	Patrick Cassidy	"Vide Cor Meum" (from the soundtrack of Hannibal)	
24 Jun 2007	Lenny Henry	Prince	"Adore"	
24 Jun 2007	Lenny Henry	Stevie Wonder	"Living for the City"	
1 Jul 2007	Linda Colley	Bach	"In Deine Hände Befehl Ich Meinen Geist ... Heute Wirst du Mit Mir"	
1 Jul 2007	Linda Colley	Aaron Copland	"Fanfare for the Common Man"	
1 Jul 2007	Linda Colley	Handel	"Where'er You Walk" (from Semele, act 2, scene 3)	
1 Jul 2007	Linda Colley	Haydn	"Sailor's Song"	
1 Jul 2007	Linda Colley	John Lennon and Paul McCartney	"Please Please Me"	
1 Jul 2007	Linda Colley	Henry Purcell	Rondeau (from Music In Abdelazer)	
1 Jul 2007	Linda Colley	Joaquín Rodrigo arr. Gil Evans	"Concierto De Aranjuez" from Sketches Of Spain	Miles Davis
1 Jul 2007	Linda Colley	Stravinsky	Firebird (Conclusion)	
8 Jul 2007	Scott Stroman	Bach	Gigue from Suite No. 3 in D major, BWV 1068	
8 Jul 2007	Scott Stroman	Beethoven	2nd movement from Quartet No. 14 in C♯ minor, Op. 131	
8 Jul 2007	Scott Stroman	Charles Ives	"Putnam's Camp" from 3 Places in New England	
8 Jul 2007	Scott Stroman	Charles Mingus	"Jelly Roll" From Mingus Ah Um	
8 Jul 2007	Scott Stroman	Dizzy Gillespie	"Manteca"	
8 Jul 2007	Scott Stroman	Duke Ellington	"Work Song" from Black, Brown, and Beige	
8 Jul 2007	Scott Stroman	Haydn	2nd movement "Adagio" from Symphony No. 99 in Elat	
8 Jul 2007	Scott Stroman	Scott Stroman-f	"Mary's Song"	"
8 Jul 2007	Scott Stroman	Stravinsky	"Pas De Deux: Apollo and Terspsichore" from Apollon Musagète	
15 Jul 2007	Joanna David	Bach	Concerto in A, BWV 1055 (1st movement - Allegro)	
15 Jul 2007	Joanna David	Samuel Barber	Adagio (opening)	
15 Jul 2007	Joanna David	Beethoven	Trio in D, Op. 70/1 – "Ghost" (1st movement – Allegro vivace e con brio)	
15 Jul 2007	Joanna David	Léo Delibes	Mazurka (From Coppelia)	
15 Jul 2007	Joanna David	Haydn	Cello Concerto in C, Hob Viib/1 (3rd movement - Allegro Molto)	
15 Jul 2007	Joanna David	Felix Mendelssohn	"Help Me, Lysander, Help Me" + Intermezzo (from A Midsummer Night's Dream)	
15 Jul 2007	Joanna David	André Messager	"J'ai Deux Amants" (from L'Amour Masque)	
15 Jul 2007	Joanna David	Robert Schumann	Romance in F♯, Op. 28/2	
15 Jul 2007	Joanna David	Verdi	"Alfredo, Alfredo, di questo core" (from La Traviata, act 2, scene 2)	
2 Sep 2007	Michele Hanson	Bach	Double Concerto in D minor, BWV 1043 (3rd movement - Allegro)	
2 Sep 2007	Michele Hanson	Chopin	Mazurka in F♯ minor, Op. 6/1	
2 Sep 2007	Michele Hanson	Handel	"His Yoke Is Easy" (from Messiah)	
2 Sep 2007	Michele Hanson	Vincent Rose, Larry Stock and Al Lewis	Blueberry Hill	Fats Domino
2 Sep 2007	Michele Hanson	Michael Praetorius	Bourée (from Terpsichore)	
2 Sep 2007	Michele Hanson	Henry Purcell	"When I Am Laid In Earth" + "With Drooping Wings" (from Dido and Aeneas)	
2 Sep 2007	Michele Hanson	Domenico Scarlatti	Sonata in G, K. 424	
2 Sep 2007	Michele Hanson	Schubert	Quintet in C, D. 956 (2nd movement - Adagio)	
2 Sep 2007	Michele Hanson	Kurt Weill	"September Song"	
9 Sep 2007	Professor Robin Wilson	Anna Russell	"Madrigal" from How To Write Your Own Gilbert & Sullivan Opera	
9 Sep 2007	Professor Robin Wilson	Arthur Sullivan	"Pilgrims Chorus with Lucifer" from The Golden Legend Sc. III	
9 Sep 2007	Professor Robin Wilson	Bach	Toccato in F	
9 Sep 2007	Professor Robin Wilson	Britten	"The Storm" from Noye's Fludde	
9 Sep 2007	Professor Robin Wilson	Carlton Gamer	Organum From Canto Lxxxi	
9 Sep 2007	Professor Robin Wilson	Frank Loesser	"Fugue For Tinhorns" from Guys & Dolls	
9 Sep 2007	Professor Robin Wilson	Haydn	2nd movement "Menuet Al Rovescio" from Piano Sonata No. 24 in A (Hob XVi :26)	
9 Sep 2007	Professor Robin Wilson	Henry Purcell	Chaconne (Two in One Upon a Ground) from Dioclesian act 3	
9 Sep 2007	Professor Robin Wilson	Telemann	Concerto for 3 Oboes, 3 Violins & Basso Continuo in B♭ major	
9 Sep 2007	Professor Robin Wilson	Verdi	"S'Appressan Gl'Istanti" from Nabucco	
9 Sep 2007	Professor Robin Wilson	Bach	"Sanctus" from B minor Mass	
16 Sep 2007	Kiran Desai	Abida Parveen	"Kal Chaudhwin Ki Raat"	
16 Sep 2007	Kiran Desai	Bach	Courante from the Cello Suite No. 2 in D minor	
16 Sep 2007	Kiran Desai	Cesária Évora	"Mae Velha" (Old Mother)	
16 Sep 2007	Kiran Desai	Manitas de Plata	"Ma Première Guitare"	
16 Sep 2007	Kiran Desai	Nikhil Banerjee	Baul Folk Tune - Gat in Medium Keharwa Taal	
16 Sep 2007	Kiran Desai	Nusrat Fateh Ali Khan	Hamd (Praise To God)	
16 Sep 2007	Kiran Desai	Francisco Tárrega	Recuerdos de La Alhambra	
16 Sep 2007	Kiran Desai	Bach	Variation 16 (from The Goldberg Variations)	
23 Sep 2007	Barry Fantoni	Samuel Barber	Opening section of Knoxville: Summer Of 1915	
23 Sep 2007	Barry Fantoni	Duke Ellington	"Blood Count"	
23 Sep 2007	Barry Fantoni	Federico Mompou	"...Pour Pénétrer Les Âmes" from Charmes	
23 Sep 2007	Barry Fantoni	Ian Carr	"Open Country" from Northumbrian Sketches (excerpt)	
23 Sep 2007	Barry Fantoni	Jacques Brel	"La Ville S'Endormait"	
23 Sep 2007	Barry Fantoni	Percy Grainger	"Shallow Brown"	
23 Sep 2007	Barry Fantoni	Rameau	"Air Gracieux" from La Naissance D'Osiris	
23 Sep 2007	Barry Fantoni	Domenico Scarlatti	Sonata K9	
23 Sep 2007	Barry Fantoni	Spike Milligan	"Another Lot"	
30 Sep 2007	Tim Hely Hutchinson	Vincenzo Bellini	"Casta Diva!" (from Norma, act 1)	
30 Sep 2007	Tim Hely Hutchinson	Donizetti	"Una furtiva lagrima" (from L'elisir d'amore, act 2)	
30 Sep 2007	Tim Hely Hutchinson	Gluck	"Che faro senza Euridice" (from Orfeo ed Euridice, act 3)	
30 Sep 2007	Tim Hely Hutchinson	Mozart	March (from Idomeneo, act 3, scene 7)	
30 Sep 2007	Tim Hely Hutchinson	Schubert	"Du Bist Die Ruh", D776	
30 Sep 2007	Tim Hely Hutchinson	Verdi	"Va pensiero" (The Chorus of the Hebrew Slaves, from Nabucco, act 3, scene 2)	
30 Sep 2007	Tim Hely Hutchinson	Mozart	"O Isis und Osiris" (from The Magic Flute, act 2)	
30 Sep 2007	Tim Hely Hutchinson	Mozart	The last part of the finale of act 4 of The Marriage of Figaro	
7 Oct 2007	Peter Nichols	Benny Goodman	Clarinet À La King	
7 Oct 2007	Peter Nichols	George Gershwin	Promenade ("Walking The Dog") (from Shall We Dance?)	
7 Oct 2007	Peter Nichols	Handel	"For Unto Us a Child Is Born" (from Messiah)	
7 Oct 2007	Peter Nichols	Hoagy Carmichael	"Stardust"	
7 Oct 2007	Peter Nichols	Josephine Baker	"C'Est un Nid Charmant" ("There's a Small Hotel")	
7 Oct 2007	Peter Nichols	Kodály	"See the Gipsies"	
7 Oct 2007	Peter Nichols	Henry Purcell	Air: "What♭t'ring Noise Is This?" (from The Indian Queen)	
7 Oct 2007	Peter Nichols	Rossini	L'Innocence Italien & Le Candour Francais (from Sins of My Old Age)	
7 Oct 2007	Peter Nichols	Stephen Sondheim and John Weidman	Please Hello (From Pacific Overtures)	
7 Oct 2007	Peter Nichols	William Walton	The Globe Theatre (From The Film Music For Henry V)	
14 Oct 2007	Jeanette Winterson	Britten	"Since She Whom I Lov'd Hath Payd Her Last Debt" (from The Holy Sonnets of John Donne)	
14 Oct 2007	Jeanette Winterson	Elgar	Cello Concerto in E minor, Op. 85 (1st movement)	
14 Oct 2007	Jeanette Winterson	Gluck	"What Is Life to Me Without Thee?"	
14 Oct 2007	Jeanette Winterson	Handel	"Verdi Prati" (from Alcina)	
14 Oct 2007	Jeanette Winterson	Puccini	"Vissi d'Arte" (Tosca act 1)	
14 Oct 2007	Jeanette Winterson	John Tavener	"Prayer of the Heart"	
14 Oct 2007	Jeanette Winterson	Madness arr. Thomas Adès	Cardiac Arrest	
14 Oct 2007	Jeanette Winterson	Wagner	Tristan und Isolde (act 2, scene 2)	
21 Oct 2007	Sir John Enderby	Beethoven	Piano Sonata No. 21 in C major "Waldstein", first movement	
21 Oct 2007	Sir John Enderby	Glenn Miller	"In The Mood"	
21 Oct 2007	Sir John Enderby	Mahler	"Nicht Wiedersehen" (from Des Knaben Wunderhorn)	
21 Oct 2007	Sir John Enderby	Pietro Mascagni	Easter Hymn (from Cavalleria Rusticana)	
21 Oct 2007	Sir John Enderby	Mozart	"Bei Männern welche Liebe fühlen" (The Magic Flute, act 1)	
21 Oct 2007	Sir John Enderby	Wagner	Prelude to the third act of Lohengrin	
21 Oct 2007	Sir John Enderby	Mozart	Horn Concerto No. 4 in E♭, K495 (2nd movement, Romanze: Andante Cantabile)	
28 Oct 2007	Joyce Carol Oates	Beethoven	Piano Sonata in F minor, Op. 57 ("Appassionata") (finale)	
28 Oct 2007	Joyce Carol Oates	Chopin	Prelude in B♭, Op. 28, No. 21	
28 Oct 2007	Joyce Carol Oates	Gabriel Fauré	Cello Sonata No. 2 in G minor, Op. 117 (2nd movement, Andante)	
28 Oct 2007	Joyce Carol Oates	Hoagy Carmichael	"Stardust"	
28 Oct 2007	Joyce Carol Oates	Mozart	Introit and Kyrie (from The Requiem, K626)	
28 Oct 2007	Joyce Carol Oates	Thelonious Monk	"Round About Midnight"	
4 Nov 2007	Peter Hennessy	Bach	"Et In Spiritum Sanctum" (from Mass in B minor, BWV 232)	
4 Nov 2007	Peter Hennessy	Beethoven	Quartet in F, Op. 59/1 (opening of 1st movement)	
4 Nov 2007	Peter Hennessy	Duke Ellington	"It Don't Mean a Thing If It Ain't Got That Swing"	
4 Nov 2007	Peter Hennessy	Harry Parr Davies	"Sing As We Go"	
4 Nov 2007	Peter Hennessy	Giovanni Battista Pergolesi	"Lucis Creator Optime" (from Marian Vespers)	
4 Nov 2007	Peter Hennessy	Jean Sibelius	Symphony No. 2 in D, Op. 43 (opening of 1st movement)	
4 Nov 2007	Peter Hennessy	Traditional Arr. Ottilie Patterson	"Goodtime Tonight"	
4 Nov 2007	Peter Hennessy	Vivian Ellis	"Coronation Scot"	
4 Nov 2007	Peter Hennessy	Wagner	Prelude to act 3 of Lohengrin	
4 Nov 2007	Peter Hennessy	Bach	Italian Concerto, BWV 971 (1st movement – Allegro)	
11 Nov 2007	William Crozier	Charlie Parker Septet	"Ornithology"	
11 Nov 2007	William Crozier	Marc-Antoine Charpentier	"Gloria" from Messe De Minuit	
11 Nov 2007	William Crozier	music by Dermot Macmurrough (Harold R. White) and lyrics by Josephine V. Rowe	Macushla	Sydney MacEwan
11 Nov 2007	William Crozier	Jacinto Almadén	"Que Te Quiero y Que Te Quiero" - A Malagueña	
11 Nov 2007	William Crozier	James MacMillan	Introit from Veni, Veni, Emmanuel	
11 Nov 2007	William Crozier	Jean Paul Egide Martini	"Plaisir d'Amour"	
11 Nov 2007	William Crozier	Shostakovich	4th movement "Largo" from String Quartet No. 8 in C minor, Op. 110	
11 Nov 2007	William Crozier	Wagner	Siegfried's Funeral March - Götterdämmerung (act 3, scene 2)	
18 Nov 2007	Chris Higgins	Bach	Gavotte En Rondeau [3rd movement from Partita No. 3 in E, BWV 1006]	
18 Nov 2007	Chris Higgins	Beethoven	Cavatina (5th movement from String Quartet in B♭, Op. 130)	
18 Nov 2007	Chris Higgins	Britten	Overture Majestic [from The Suite For Harp]	
18 Nov 2007	Chris Higgins	Jon Lord	Evening Rags and Galas (from Durham Concerto)	
18 Nov 2007	Chris Higgins	Felix Mendelssohn	Octet [1st movement, Allegro Moderato, Ma Con Fuoco]	
18 Nov 2007	Chris Higgins	Monteverdi	Piu Ti Miro [Final Duet from The Coronation of Poppea]	
18 Nov 2007	Chris Higgins	Mozart	Sinfonia Concertante in E♭, K364 [Finale, Presto]	
18 Nov 2007	Chris Higgins	Shostakovich	String Quartet No. 8 in C minor, Op. 110 [2nd movement Allegro Molto]	
18 Nov 2007	Chris Higgins	Wagner	Prelude to Das Rheingold	
25 Nov 2007	Charlie Haden	Arvo Pärt	Cantus in Memory of Benjamin Britten	
25 Nov 2007	Charlie Haden	Bill Evans	"Young and Foolish"	
25 Nov 2007	Charlie Haden	Bud Powell	"Celia"	
25 Nov 2007	Charlie Haden	Charlie Parker	"Kim"	
25 Nov 2007	Charlie Haden	Chopin	"Etude No. 6 In E♭" (Op. 10)	
25 Nov 2007	Charlie Haden	Rachmaninov	"Lento" from The Bells Op. 35 (excerpt)	
25 Nov 2007	Charlie Haden	Ravel	Slow movement from Piano Concerto in G major	
25 Nov 2007	Charlie Haden	Victor Young	"The Left Hand of God" (excerpt)	
2 Dec 2007	John Nickson	Bach	Cantata No. 190 Singet Dem Herrn Ein Neues Lied	
2 Dec 2007	John Nickson	Alban Berg	Wozzeck (Orchestral Epilogue in Final Scene)	
2 Dec 2007	John Nickson	Bruckner	Symphony No. 4 (4th movement, opening)	
2 Dec 2007	John Nickson	Elgar	Symphony No. 2 (2nd movement, Larghetto, excerpt)	
2 Dec 2007	John Nickson	Leoš Janáček	"The Owl Has Not Flown Away" from On the Overgrown Path	
2 Dec 2007	John Nickson	Henry Purcell	Suite from The Fairy Queen: Prelude	
2 Dec 2007	John Nickson	Rodgers and Hammerstein	"Climb Every Mountain"	
2 Dec 2007	John Nickson	Jean Sibelius	Symphony No. 7 (The End)	
2 Dec 2007	John Nickson	The Beatles	"Because" (from Love Album)	
2 Dec 2007	John Nickson	Wagner	Die Walküre (end of act 1)	
9 Dec 2007	Claire Bloom	Bach	Prelude from Cello Suite No. 2 in D minor, BWV 1008	
9 Dec 2007	Claire Bloom	Vincenzo Bellini	"Casta Diva" (from Norma act 1)	
9 Dec 2007	Claire Bloom	Mozart	"Una Donna A Quindici Anni" (from Così fan tutte, act 2)	
9 Dec 2007	Claire Bloom	Richard Strauss	"Die Zeit, die ist ein sonderbar' Ding" (The Marschallin's act 1 aria from Der Rosenkavalier)	
9 Dec 2007	Claire Bloom	Arnold Schoenberg	"Verklärte Nacht"	
9 Dec 2007	Claire Bloom	Schubert	Piano Sonata in A, D959 (2nd movement, Andantino)	
9 Dec 2007	Claire Bloom	Tchaikovsky	The Letter Scene (from Eugene Onegin act 1)	
9 Dec 2007	Claire Bloom	Verdi	Otello (end of)	
23 Dec 2007	Derren Brown	Anita Baker	"Sweet Love"	
23 Dec 2007	Derren Brown	Bach	"Aria Da Capo" from Goldberg Variations BWV 988	
23 Dec 2007	Derren Brown	Beethoven	2nd movement "Adagio" from Piano Concerto No. 5 in E♭, Op. 73 "Emperor"	
23 Dec 2007	Derren Brown	Elgar	"Praise To His Name !/Take Me Away" from The Dream Of Gerontius	
23 Dec 2007	Derren Brown	Richard Strauss	"Morgen!" Op. 27, No. 4	
23 Dec 2007	Derren Brown	Thomas Tallis	"Spem In Alium"	
23 Dec 2007	Derren Brown	Bach	Prelude from Cello Suite No. 1 in G major	

== 2008 ==
Date	Guest	Composer	Title	Performer, label
13 Jan 2008	Christopher Nupen	Bach	Chaconne (from Partita No. 2 in D minor, BWV 1004) (excerpt)	
13 Jan 2008	Christopher Nupen	Beethoven	String Quartet in A minor, Op. 132	
13 Jan 2008	Christopher Nupen	Elgar	Cello Concerto in E minor, Op. 85 (2nd movement, Scherzo)	
13 Jan 2008	Christopher Nupen	Leoncavallo	"Vesti La Giubba" (from I Pagliacci)	
13 Jan 2008	Christopher Nupen	Puccini	"Tre Sbirri" (Te Deum) (from Tosca, act 1)	
13 Jan 2008	Christopher Nupen	Schubert	"Im Abendrot"	
13 Jan 2008	Christopher Nupen	Traditional arr. Manuel De Falla	Polo (No 7 from The Popular Spanish Songs)	
13 Jan 2008	Christopher Nupen	Verdi	"Bella figlia dell'amore" (from Rigoletto, act 2)	
13 Jan 2008	Christopher Nupen	Wagner	"Du Bist Der Lenz..." (from Die Walküre, act 1)	
20 Jan 2008	Katie Melua	Beethoven	1st movement from Piano Sonata No. 14 in C♯ minor, "Moonlight"	
20 Jan 2008	Katie Melua	Chopin	Nocturne No. 16 in E♭ major (Op. 55, No. 2)	
20 Jan 2008	Katie Melua	Ella Fitzgerald	"I Can't Give You Anything but Love"	
20 Jan 2008	Katie Melua	Joni Mitchell	"A Case Of You"	
20 Jan 2008	Katie Melua	Katie Melua	"Mary Pickford" (excerpt)	
20 Jan 2008	Katie Melua	Paul Simon	Homeward Bound	
20 Jan 2008	Katie Melua	Ravel	2nd movement from Piano Concerto in G major	
20 Jan 2008	Katie Melua	Tchaikovsky	"Dance of the Sugar Plum Fairy" from The Nutcracker Suite	
20 Jan 2008	Katie Melua	Traditional music	"David In The Lions Den"	
27 Jan 2008	Bryan Appleyard	Bach	Dona Nobis Pacem (Mass in B minor)	
27 Jan 2008	Bryan Appleyard	Beethoven	Quartet in B♭, Op. 130 (4th movement, Alla danza tedesca)	
27 Jan 2008	Bryan Appleyard	Bob Dylan	"The Lonesome Death of Hattie Carroll"	
27 Jan 2008	Bryan Appleyard	Chopin	Nocturne in C minor (1837)	
27 Jan 2008	Bryan Appleyard	Gram Parsons	"She"	
27 Jan 2008	Bryan Appleyard	Mozart	Symphony No. 41 "Jupiter" (4th movement, Molto Allegro)	
27 Jan 2008	Bryan Appleyard	Schubert	Litanei auf Das Fest Allerseelen, D343	
27 Jan 2008	Bryan Appleyard	Schubert	String Quartet in D minor (Death and the Maiden) (3rd movement, Scherzo)	
27 Jan 2008	Bryan Appleyard	Thomas Tallis	Salvator Mundi	
2 Mar 2008	Frank Tallis	Carlo Gesualdo	Responsorium 1 (from Feria Quinta - In Coena Domini)	
2 Mar 2008	Frank Tallis	Mahler	"Ich Bin Der Welt Abhanden Gekommen"	
2 Mar 2008	Frank Tallis	Miles Davis	Nuit Sur Les Champs-Élysées (from the film Ascenseur pour l'échafaud)	
2 Mar 2008	Frank Tallis	Mozart	Adagio K356	
2 Mar 2008	Frank Tallis	Rachmaninov	"How Beautiful It Is Here", Op. 21, No. 7	
2 Mar 2008	Frank Tallis	Takemitsu	Waltz (from the film score for The Face of Another)	
2 Mar 2008	Frank Tallis	Walter Leigh	Andante (from the Concertino for Harpsichord and String Orchestra)	
2 Mar 2008	Frank Tallis	Zemlinsky	"Friede, Mien Herz" (Molto Adagio, 7th movement from The Lyric Symphony, Op. 18)	
9 Mar 2008	Edward Gillespie (MD Cheltenham racecourse)	Bach	5th movement "Gavotte" from Cello Suite No. 6 in D major	
9 Mar 2008	Edward Gillespie (MD Cheltenham racecourse)	Charles Villiers Stanford	Te Deum in B♭	
9 Mar 2008	Edward Gillespie (MD Cheltenham racecourse)	Edvard Grieg	1st movement Präludium from Holberg Suite Op. 40	
9 Mar 2008	Edward Gillespie (MD Cheltenham racecourse)	Jerry Orbach	"She Likes Basketball" from Promises, Promises	
9 Mar 2008	Edward Gillespie (MD Cheltenham racecourse)	Herbert Howells	2nd movement from In Gloucestershire (String Quartet No. 3)	
9 Mar 2008	Edward Gillespie (MD Cheltenham racecourse)	Josef Locke	Galway Bay	
9 Mar 2008	Edward Gillespie (MD Cheltenham racecourse)	Carl Rütti	4th movement "Wer Bist Du" from Till Earthly Passions Turn	
9 Mar 2008	Edward Gillespie (MD Cheltenham racecourse)	Percy Grainger	Tribute to Foster (based on a melody of Stephen Foster)	
16 Mar 2008	Ian McKeever	Antony Hegarty	"What Can I Do?"	
16 Mar 2008	Ian McKeever	Keith Jarrett	"Hymn"	
16 Mar 2008	Ian McKeever	John Coltrane	"Alabama"	
16 Mar 2008	Ian McKeever	Messiaen	Trois Petites Liturgies de la Présence Divine (2nd movement)	
16 Mar 2008	Ian McKeever	N/A	Closing Bells from The Russian Orthodox Liturgy	
16 Mar 2008	Ian McKeever	Richard Strauss	"Frühling" (from Four Last Songs)	
16 Mar 2008	Ian McKeever	Wayne Shorter	"Atlantis"	
16 Mar 2008	Ian McKeever	Karol Szymanowski	"Fac Me Tecum Pie Flere" (from Stabat Mater, Op. 53)	
23 Mar 2008	Vanessa Redgrave	Beethoven	Sonata in C minor, Op. 8 – "Pathétique" (1st movement)	
23 Mar 2008	Vanessa Redgrave	Britten	"It Seemed That Out Of Battle I Escaped" + "Let Us Sleep Now" (from War Requiem, Op. 66)	
23 Mar 2008	Vanessa Redgrave	Mozart	Sinfonia Concertante in E♭, K. 297b (3rd movement - Andantino Con Variazioni)	
23 Mar 2008	Vanessa Redgrave	Paolo Conte	"Via Con Me"	
23 Mar 2008	Vanessa Redgrave	Ralph Vaughan Williams	Fantasia On Greensleeves	
23 Mar 2008	Vanessa Redgrave	Stefan Wolpe	Piece of Embittered Music (from Zemach Suite)	
30 Mar 2008	Paul Old	Aaron Copland	7th movement from Appalachian Spring	
30 Mar 2008	Paul Old	Gavin Bryars	Music from "Jesus' Blood Never Failed Me Yet"	
30 Mar 2008	Paul Old	Gluck	Music from 1st act of Orfeo ed Euridice	
30 Mar 2008	Paul Old	John Cage	Sonata No. 16 from Sonatas and Interludes For Prepared Piano	
30 Mar 2008	Paul Old	Leonard Cohen	"Hallelujah"	
30 Mar 2008	Paul Old	Maria Delmarbonet	Tonada De Treball. De Llaurar	
30 Mar 2008	Paul Old	Maxwell Davies	Music from Hymnos For Clarinet & Piano	
30 Mar 2008	Paul Old	Nina Simone	"Ne me quitte pas"	
30 Mar 2008	Paul Old	Steve Reich	Music From Octet	
6 Apr 2008	Edward Fox	Bach	Prelude and Fugue No. 22 in B♭ minor BWV 867	
6 Apr 2008	Edward Fox	Beethoven	3rd movement from Sonata No. 17 in D minor, Op. 31, No. 2 "Der Sturm"	
6 Apr 2008	Edward Fox	Brahms	Slow movement from Piano Concerto No. 2 in B♭, Op. 83	
6 Apr 2008	Edward Fox	Chopin	Berceuse in D♭ major, Op. 57	
6 Apr 2008	Edward Fox	Hugo Wolf	"Nachtzauber" from Eichendorff-Lieder	
6 Apr 2008	Edward Fox	Schubert	Fantasy in C For Violin and Piano D934	
13 Apr 2008	Simon Baron-Cohen	Aretha Franklin	"I Say A Little Prayer"	
13 Apr 2008	Simon Baron-Cohen	Bach	4th movement 'Sarabande' from Cello Suite No. 1 in G major, BWV 1007	
13 Apr 2008	Simon Baron-Cohen	Beethoven	Adagio from Piano Sonata No. 8 in C minor "Pathetique"	
13 Apr 2008	Simon Baron-Cohen	Belsen	German Concentration Camp Service & Interviews After Liberation	
13 Apr 2008	Simon Baron-Cohen	Chopin	Prelude No. 4 in E minor (Op. 28)	
13 Apr 2008	Simon Baron-Cohen	Eva Cassidy	"Ain't No Sunshine"	
13 Apr 2008	Simon Baron-Cohen	Mozart	"Lacrimosa" from Requiem	
13 Apr 2008	Simon Baron-Cohen	Carlos Santana	Smooth	
13 Apr 2008	Simon Baron-Cohen	Traditional music	Reb Dovid'L	The Klezmer Swingers
20 Apr 2008	PJ Harvey	Arvo Pärt	Fratres	
20 Apr 2008	PJ Harvey	Howe Gelb	"Dear Diary"	
20 Apr 2008	PJ Harvey	Nick Cave And The Bad Seeds	"From Her To Eternity"	
20 Apr 2008	PJ Harvey	Nina Simone	"You'll Never Walk Alone"	
20 Apr 2008	PJ Harvey	PJ Harvey	"The Devil"	
20 Apr 2008	PJ Harvey	Traditional music	"Songs of the Volga Boatmen"	
20 Apr 2008	PJ Harvey	Ralph Vaughan Williams	Fantasia on a Theme by Thomas Tallis	
27 Apr 2008	Colin Low	Robert Schumann	Kreisleriana, Op. 16 (1st movement - Agitatissimo)	
27 Apr 2008	Colin Low	Harold Arlen and Ted Koehler	Get Happy	
27 Apr 2008	Colin Low	Leopold Godowsky	Study No. 43 in C♯ minor (after Chopin's Study Op. 25/12)	
27 Apr 2008	Colin Low	Percy Grainger	The Warriors (Conclusion)	
27 Apr 2008	Colin Low	Messiaen	"L'Alouette Calandrelle" (from Catalogue d'Oiseaux)	
27 Apr 2008	Colin Low	Quilter	"O Mistress Mine"	
27 Apr 2008	Colin Low	Robert Schumann	Mondnacht (from Liederkreis, Op. 39)	
27 Apr 2008	Colin Low	Wagner	Die Walküre (conclusion of act 1)	
27 Apr 2008	Colin Low	Peter Warlock	"Rest, Sweet Nymphs"	
27 Apr 2008	Colin Low	Hugo Wolf	Mühvoll Komm'Ich Und Beladen (From Spanish Songbook)	
4 May 2008	Brian Foster	Bach	Goldberg Variations (No. 30 Quodlibet & Aria Da Capo)	
4 May 2008	Brian Foster	Brahms	Violin Concerto (3rd movement)	
4 May 2008	Brian Foster	Max Bruch	Violin Concerto No. 1 in G minor, Op. 26 (1st movement (opening))	
4 May 2008	Brian Foster	Mozart	"Soave sia il vento" (Così fan tutte act 1, scene 2)	
4 May 2008	Brian Foster	Giovanni Pierluigi Da Palestrina	Missa Papae Marcelli (Kyrie, Opening)	
4 May 2008	Brian Foster	Sergei Prokofiev	Violin Sonata No. 2 in D, Op. 94 (4th movement Allegro Molto)	
4 May 2008	Brian Foster	Shostakovich	Piano Trio No. 2 (2nd movement, Scherzo)	
4 May 2008	Brian Foster	Mozart	Violin Sonata in E♭ major, K. 380 (3rd movement: Rondeau, Allegro)	
11 May 2008	Colin Salmon	Béla Bartók	"Round Dance" from Five Pieces For Children Sz 42	
11 May 2008	Colin Salmon	Billy Strayhorn	"Lush Life"	
11 May 2008	Colin Salmon	Coleridge-Taylor Perkinson	"Perpetual Motion" 4th movement from Black/Folksong Suite For Solo Cello	
11 May 2008	Colin Salmon	Duke Ellington	"Isfahan" (from The Far East Suite)	
11 May 2008	Colin Salmon	Jaheim	"Fabulous"	
11 May 2008	Colin Salmon	Leonard Salzedo	"Prelude" from Divertimento for 3 Trumpets and 3 Trombones	
11 May 2008	Colin Salmon	Miles Davis	"The Pan Piper" (from Sketches of Spain)	
11 May 2008	Colin Salmon	Sergei Prokofiev	"Introduction" from Romeo and Juliet	
11 May 2008	Colin Salmon	Richard Strauss	Morgen' Op. 27, No. 4	
11 May 2008	Colin Salmon	Ronald Binge	Cornet Carillon	
25 May 2008	Terry Burns	Bach	"Ach, Schlage Doch Bald, Sel'Ge Stunde" (from Christus, der ist mein Leben, BWV 95)	
25 May 2008	Terry Burns	Beethoven	Symphony No. 5 in C minor, Op. 67 (1st movement – Allegro con brio)	
25 May 2008	Terry Burns	Debussy	String Quartet (2nd movement - Scherzo)	
25 May 2008	Terry Burns	Monteverdi	Vespro Della Beata Vergine (Opening)	
25 May 2008	Terry Burns	Mozart	"Vostre dunque saran queste carte" (from Le nozze di Figaro, act 2)	
25 May 2008	Terry Burns	Henry Purcell	"One Charming Night" (from The Fairy-Queen, act 2)	
25 May 2008	Terry Burns	Stravinsky	Final Hymn (from Firebird Suite - 1945)	
25 May 2008	Terry Burns	Stravinsky	Augurs Of Spring + Mock Abduction (from The Rite of Spring)	
25 May 2008	Terry Burns	Bach	Partita No. 3 in E, BWV 1006 (3rd movement - Gavotte En Rondeau)	
1 Jun 2008	Maria Chevska	Alban Berg	"Lied Der Lulu" from Lulu Suite	
1 Jun 2008	Maria Chevska	Krzysztof Komeda	"Sleep Safe and Warm"	
1 Jun 2008	Maria Chevska	Mahler	"Farewell" from The Song of The Earth	
1 Jun 2008	Maria Chevska	Arnold Schoenberg	No 2 of the Three Piano Pieces (Op. 11)	
1 Jun 2008	Maria Chevska	Shostakovich	Last movement "Allegro" from String Quartet No. 9	
1 Jun 2008	Maria Chevska	Sofia Gubaidulina	"In Croce" (for Cello and Accordion)	
1 Jun 2008	Maria Chevska	Bach	2nd movement from Concerto for Two Violins	
8 Jun 2008	Philip Stott	Bach	"Alles Nur Nach Gottes Willen" (Opening Chorus from Cantata BWV 72)	
8 Jun 2008	Philip Stott	Beethoven	Symphony No. 4 in B♭, Op. 60 (4th movement – Allegro ma non troppo)	
8 Jun 2008	Philip Stott	Fanny Mendelssohn	String Quartet in E♭ (1st movement - Adagio Ma Non Troppo)	
8 Jun 2008	Philip Stott	Haydn	Kyrie (from Missa in Angustiis -"Nelson Mass")	
8 Jun 2008	Philip Stott	Haydn	Quartet in C, Op. 20/6 (4th movement - Fugue)	
8 Jun 2008	Philip Stott	Mozart	Sinfonia Concertante in E♭, K. 364 (2nd movement - Andante)	
8 Jun 2008	Philip Stott	Camille Saint-Saëns	Piano Quartet in E (Finale - Allegro Con Fuoco)	
15 Jun 2008	Robert Fisk	Brahms	Concerto for Violin and Cello in A minor, Op. 102 (1st movement)	
15 Jun 2008	Robert Fisk	Britten	"Dies Irae" (from The War Requiem)	
15 Jun 2008	Robert Fisk	Cecil Coles	Lament (from The Scottish Highlands)	
15 Jun 2008	Robert Fisk	Handel	Organ Concerto in F, Op. 4, No. 5 (2nd movement)	
15 Jun 2008	Robert Fisk	John Williams	Theme from Schindler's List	
15 Jun 2008	Robert Fisk	Reading - Robert Fisk	The Age of the Warrior (Fourth Estate) P240	
15 Jun 2008	Robert Fisk	Shostakovich	Symphony No. 7 in C, Op. 60 (The Leningrad)	
22 Jun 2008	Rowan Williams	Bach	Concerto in D minor for Oboe and Violin, BWV 1060	
22 Jun 2008	Rowan Williams	Britten	"O All Ye Works of the Lord" (from The Burning Fiery Furnace)	
22 Jun 2008	Rowan Williams	William Byrd	"Christ Rising Again from the Dead"	
22 Jun 2008	Rowan Williams	John Dowland	"Lachrimae Pavan"	
22 Jun 2008	Rowan Williams	Mozart	Opening of the finale of act 1 of The Magic Flute	
22 Jun 2008	Rowan Williams	Reading - Rowan Williams	Pavana Dolorosa (from Tenebrae)	
22 Jun 2008	Rowan Williams	Reading - Rowan Williams	"Wir Setzen Uns"	
22 Jun 2008	Rowan Williams	Bach	"Wir Setzen Uns Mit Tränen Nieder" (Final Chorus The St Matthew Passion)	
22 Jun 2008	Rowan Williams	Robert Schumann	Piano Concerto in A minor, Op. 54 (Intermezzo Andante Grazioso)	
22 Jun 2008	Rowan Williams	Traditional Welsh Folksong	Y Deryn Pur (The Pure Bird)	
29 Jun 2008	Matt Frei	Beethoven	Final movement from Symphony No. 9 in D minor (excerpt)	
29 Jun 2008	Matt Frei	Mahler	1st movement from Symphony No. 5 (excerpt)	
29 Jun 2008	Matt Frei	Mozart	1st movement from Concerto for Flute and Orchestra in G major, K. 313	
29 Jun 2008	Matt Frei	Giovanni Pierluigi Da Palestrina	"Exulatate Deo"	
29 Jun 2008	Matt Frei	Puccini	"O soave fanciulla" from La bohème act 1	
29 Jun 2008	Matt Frei	Verdi	"Già nella notte densa..." from Otello act 1, scene 3	
20 Jul 2008	Margaret Hodge	Beethoven	Piano Concerto No. 4 in G, Op. 58 (2nd movement, Andante con moto)	
20 Jul 2008	Margaret Hodge	Vincenzo Bellini	Casta Diva (From Norma)	
20 Jul 2008	Margaret Hodge	Britten	"Now The Great Bear and Pleiedes" (Peter Grimes, act 1, scene 2)	
20 Jul 2008	Margaret Hodge	Chopin	Nocturne Op. 9 No. 2 in E♭	
20 Jul 2008	Margaret Hodge	Debussy	Sonata For Flute, Viola and Harp (Finale)	
20 Jul 2008	Margaret Hodge	Ed McCurdy	"Last Night I Had the Strangest Dream"	
20 Jul 2008	Margaret Hodge	Arnold Schoenberg	"Verklärte Nacht" (The End)	
20 Jul 2008	Margaret Hodge	Wagner	Overture to Tannhäuser	
17 Aug 2008	Ffion Hague	Harold Arlen and Yip Harburg	"Over the Rainbow"	
17 Aug 2008	Ffion Hague	Bach	1st movement from Concerto for Two Violins	
17 Aug 2008	Ffion Hague	Bruckner	"Christus Factus Est" (Motet)	
17 Aug 2008	Ffion Hague	Gabriel Fauré	Cantique de Jean Racine, Op. 11	
17 Aug 2008	Ffion Hague	Jerry Gray	"A String of Pearls"	
17 Aug 2008	Ffion Hague	Mozart	2nd movement from Clarinet Concerto K622	
17 Aug 2008	Ffion Hague	Traditional music	"Suo-Gân"	
24 Aug 2008	Richard Fortey	Béla Bartók	Music for Strings, Percussion and Celeste (Adagio)	
24 Aug 2008	Richard Fortey	Britten	Rejoice in the Lamb Festival Cantata, Op. 30 (Chorus: For I Am Under The Same Accusation)	
24 Aug 2008	Richard Fortey	Leoš Janáček	The Cunning Little Vixen	
24 Aug 2008	Richard Fortey	Messiaen	"Regard Des Hauteurs" (Vingt Regards sur L'Enfant Jésus)	
24 Aug 2008	Richard Fortey	Miles Davis	"Two Bass Hit" (Lewis/Gillespie)	
24 Aug 2008	Richard Fortey	Ravel	Dawn from Daphnis and Chloe	
24 Aug 2008	Richard Fortey	Ralph Vaughan Williams	Romance for Harmonica and Orchestra	
7 Sep 2008	Judy Collins	Aaron Copland	Lincoln Portrait (excerpt)	
7 Sep 2008	Judy Collins	Francesco Landini	"Lasso ! Di Donna"	
7 Sep 2008	Judy Collins	Joni Mitchell	"Both Sides Now"	
7 Sep 2008	Judy Collins	Judy Collins	"Since You've Asked"	
7 Sep 2008	Judy Collins	Kenny White	Symphony in 16 Bars	
7 Sep 2008	Judy Collins	Ned Rorem	"Early in The Morning" (Robert Hillier)	
7 Sep 2008	Judy Collins	Ned Rorem	"I Am Rose2 (Gertrude Stein)	
7 Sep 2008	Judy Collins	Rachmaninov	1st movement from Piano Concerto No. 2 in C minor, Op. 18	
7 Sep 2008	Judy Collins	Stephen Sondheim	"Pretty Women" from Sweeney Todd	
14 Sep 2008	Alex Ross	Bob Dylan	"Simple Twist of Fate" (from Blood On the Tracks)	
14 Sep 2008	Alex Ross	Brahms	Intermezzo in E♭, Op. 117, No. 1	
14 Sep 2008	Alex Ross	John Adams	"I Am Old and I Cannot Sleep" (from Nixon in China)	
14 Sep 2008	Alex Ross	Ligeti	Lacrimosa (from The Requiem)	
14 Sep 2008	Alex Ross	Percy Grainger	"Shallow Brown"	
14 Sep 2008	Alex Ross	Henry Purcell	"Thy Hand Belinda...When I Am Laid In Earth" (from Dido and Aeneas)	
14 Sep 2008	Alex Ross	Richard Strauss	"Ach, Ich Habe Deinen Mund Geküsst" (from Salome)	
21 Sep 2008	Dominic West	Arvo Pärt	Spiegel Im Spiegel (Mirror in the Mirror)	
21 Sep 2008	Dominic West	Claudio Villa	Stornelli Amorisi	
21 Sep 2008	Dominic West	Handel	"Zadok The Priest"	
21 Sep 2008	Dominic West	Jake Thackray	"Sister Josephine"	
21 Sep 2008	Dominic West	Mozart	"Laudate Dominum" from Vespers K339	
21 Sep 2008	Dominic West	Giovanni Battista Pergolesi	"Stabat Mater"	
21 Sep 2008	Dominic West	Schubert	"Der Leiermann" from Winterreise D911	
21 Sep 2008	Dominic West	West African Rhythm Brothers	"Sing The Blues"	
21 Sep 2008	Dominic West	Young Holt Unlimited	"Ain't There Something Money Can't Buy"	
28 Sep 2008	Jennifer Worth	Archangelsky	"Lord, Hear My Prayer"	
28 Sep 2008	Jennifer Worth	Bach	Prelude and Fugue in G (Well-Tempered Clavier, Book 2)	
28 Sep 2008	Jennifer Worth	Chopin	Nocturne in C♯ minor, Op. 27, No. 1	
28 Sep 2008	Jennifer Worth	Antonín Dvořák	Sonatina in G, Op. 100 (II. Larghetto)	
28 Sep 2008	Jennifer Worth	Édith Piaf	"C'Est Merveilleux" (Contet/Monnot)	
28 Sep 2008	Jennifer Worth	Traditional Hebridean Folksong arr. Marjory Kennedy-Fraser	"Skye Fisher's Song"	
28 Sep 2008	Jennifer Worth	Herbert Howells	"King David"	
28 Sep 2008	Jennifer Worth	Traditional Paraguayan	Pájaro Campana (The Bell Bird)	
28 Sep 2008	Jennifer Worth	Verdi	"Chi Fai?... Amami Alfredo!" (from La traviata, act 2, scene 1)	
28 Sep 2008	Jennifer Worth	Vivaldi	Gloria In Excelsis Deo (From The Gloria)	
5 Oct 2008	John Burnside	Bach	Partita No. 2 in C minor	
5 Oct 2008	John Burnside	Fernanda de Utrera	"Mi Mal No Tiene Cura"	
5 Oct 2008	John Burnside	Handel	"De Torrente" (from Dixit Dominus)	
5 Oct 2008	John Burnside	John Sheppard	Media Vita	
5 Oct 2008	John Burnside	Miles Davis	"Time After Time" (Hyman/Lauper)	
5 Oct 2008	John Burnside	Nikhil Banerjee	Raga Bhimpalasri (excerpt)	
5 Oct 2008	John Burnside	Michael Tippett	Fantasia Concertante On a Theme of Corelli (excerpt)	
12 Oct 2008	Nick Clegg	Chopin	Piano Concerto No. 2 in F minor (2nd movement, Larghetto)	
12 Oct 2008	Nick Clegg	Chopin	Waltz in A minor, Op. posth.	
12 Oct 2008	Nick Clegg	Mozart	Laudate Dominum (from The Vesperae Solennes De Confessore, K339)	
12 Oct 2008	Nick Clegg	Richard Strauss	Beim Schlafengehen (No. 3 from Four Last Songs)	
12 Oct 2008	Nick Clegg	Schubert	Erlkönig	
12 Oct 2008	Nick Clegg	Schubert	Impromptu E♭ minor	
19 Oct 2008	Peter Kosminsky	Beethoven	Symphony No. 6 in F, Op. 68 ("Pastoral") 1st movement, The Awakening of Pleasant Feelings on Arriving in the Countryside	
19 Oct 2008	Peter Kosminsky	Max Bruch	"Kol Nidrei", Op. 47	
19 Oct 2008	Peter Kosminsky	Elgar	Cello Concerto in E minor, Op. 85 (1st movement, Adagio - Moderato)	
19 Oct 2008	Peter Kosminsky	Jocelyn Pook	Oppenheimer (from Flood)	
19 Oct 2008	Peter Kosminsky	Mike Westbrook	"I See Thy Form"	
19 Oct 2008	Peter Kosminsky	Mozart	Requiem, K626 (Lacrimosa)	
19 Oct 2008	Peter Kosminsky	Philip Glass	The Photographer (act 1: A Gentleman's Honor)	
26 Oct 2008	Marcia Schofield	Arvo Pärt	Tabula Rasa (excerpt)	
26 Oct 2008	Marcia Schofield	Bach	3rd movement "Aria" from Suite No. 5 in G minor, BWV 1070	
26 Oct 2008	Marcia Schofield	Béla Bartók	Bluebeard's Castle - Door 4 - The Garden	
26 Oct 2008	Marcia Schofield	Glenn Gould	"The Idea Of North" from Solitude Trilogy	
26 Oct 2008	Marcia Schofield	John Adams	On The Transmigration Of Souls (excerpt)	
26 Oct 2008	Marcia Schofield	John Tavener	Part III from The Protecting Veil	
26 Oct 2008	Marcia Schofield	Alexander Scriabin	Prometheus (excerpt)	
26 Oct 2008	Marcia Schofield	Tom Waits	"What's He Building?"	
2 Nov 2008	Richard Alston	Bach	"Aus Liebe Will Mein Heiland Sterben" (St Matthew Passion, Part 2)	
2 Nov 2008	Richard Alston	Britten	"Billy's Ballad" (from Billy Budd, act 4 [original 4-act version])	
2 Nov 2008	Richard Alston	Cole Porter	"After You Who?"	
2 Nov 2008	Richard Alston	Frank Sinatra	"In The Wee Small Hours of the Morning" (Mann/Hilliard)	
2 Nov 2008	Richard Alston	Handel	"O Lord Whose Mercies Numberless" (from Saul, act 1, scene 5)	
2 Nov 2008	Richard Alston	Madeleine Peyroux	"This Is Heaven To Me"	
2 Nov 2008	Richard Alston	Henry Purcell	"Thou Knowest Lord the Secrets of Our Hearts"	
2 Nov 2008	Richard Alston	Camille Saint-Saëns	Piano Concerto No. 5 (3rd movement, Molto Allegro)	
2 Nov 2008	Richard Alston	Traditional Sufi Qawwali	Maulah Ali Maulah Ali (Manqabat in Raga Bhairvi)	
9 Nov 2008	David Almond	Béla Bartók	Duke Bluebeard's Castle (Door 5)	
9 Nov 2008	David Almond	Aaron Copland	"Fanfare for the Common Man"	
9 Nov 2008	David Almond	Handel	Verdi Prati (Alcina, act 2, scene 11)	
9 Nov 2008	David Almond	Tod Machover	"I Dreamt a Dream"	
9 Nov 2008	David Almond	Monteverdi	Possente Spirto (L'Orfeo act 3)	
9 Nov 2008	David Almond	Mozart	"Soave sia il vento" (Così fan tutte, act 1)	
9 Nov 2008	David Almond	Puccini	"One Fine Day" (from the film First Love) (Madame Butterfly act 2)	
9 Nov 2008	David Almond	Traditional Japanese Noh Music	Nakairiraigyo	
16 Nov 2008	Terence Blanchard	Debussy	Prélude À L'Après-Midi d'un Faune	
16 Nov 2008	Terence Blanchard	Freddie Hubbard	"The Intrepid Fox" (excerpt)	
16 Nov 2008	Terence Blanchard	George Gershwin	"A Foggy Day"	
16 Nov 2008	Terence Blanchard	Prince	"The Sacrifice Of Victor"	
16 Nov 2008	Terence Blanchard	Richard Strauss	"Orest ! Orest ! Es Rührt Sich Niemand !" from Elektra	
16 Nov 2008	Terence Blanchard	Stravinsky	Music From Part I of The Rite Of Spring	
16 Nov 2008	Terence Blanchard	Terence Blanchard	"Ghost Of Congo Square" (excerpt)	
16 Nov 2008	Terence Blanchard	Weather Report	"Madagascar"	
23 Nov 2008	Rick Wakeman	Albert Franz Doppler	Music From Fantaisie Pastorale Hongroise Op. 26	
23 Nov 2008	Rick Wakeman	Arvo Pärt	"Summa"	
23 Nov 2008	Rick Wakeman	David Bowie	"Life On Mars" (excerpt)	
23 Nov 2008	Rick Wakeman	Debussy	"Le Vent dans La Plaine" from Preludes Book 1	
23 Nov 2008	Rick Wakeman	Ivan Rebroff	"Song of the Volga Boatman"	
23 Nov 2008	Rick Wakeman	Sergei Prokofiev	Music from Ivan The Terrible	
23 Nov 2008	Rick Wakeman	Shostakovich	4th movement from Concerto for Piano, Trumpet and Strings in C minor	
23 Nov 2008	Rick Wakeman	Bedřich Smetana	4th movement from Quartet No. 1 in E minor	
30 Nov 2008	Paul Rhys	Bach	"Wir Setzen uns mit Tränen Nieder" (Final Chorus from the St Matthew Passion)	
30 Nov 2008	Paul Rhys	Beethoven	String Quartet in A minor, Op. 132 (first movement, excerpt)	
30 Nov 2008	Paul Rhys	David Bowie	"Life On Mars?" (from Hunky Dory)	
30 Nov 2008	Paul Rhys	Kurt Weill	"That's Him" (from One Touch of Venus)	
30 Nov 2008	Paul Rhys	Mahler	Abschied (from Das Lied Von Der Erde (excerpt))	
30 Nov 2008	Paul Rhys	Puccini	"Soave fanciulla" (duet from the end of act 1 of La bohème)	
30 Nov 2008	Paul Rhys	Henry Purcell	"What Power Art Thou" (King Arthur, act 3)	
30 Nov 2008	Paul Rhys	Ravel	Piano Trio in A minor (1st movement, opening)	
30 Nov 2008	Paul Rhys	Schubert	String Quartet in D minor, D810 (Death and the Maiden) (1st movement, excerpt)	
30 Nov 2008	Paul Rhys	Traditional music	"Ar Hyd Y Nos" ("All Through the Night")	
7 Dec 2008	Janice Galloway	Bach	Concerto in D minor for 2 violins, BWV 1043 (1st movement: Vivace)	
7 Dec 2008	Janice Galloway	Britten	Balulalow and Deo Gracias! (from A Ceremony of Carols)	
7 Dec 2008	Janice Galloway	Britten	"Dirge: This Ae Night" (from Serenade For Tenor, Horn & Strings, Op. 31)	
7 Dec 2008	Janice Galloway	Britten	"The Bird-Scarer's Song"	
7 Dec 2008	Janice Galloway	Chopin	Study in G♭, Op. 10, No. 5: 2Black Keys"	
7 Dec 2008	Janice Galloway	Clara Schumann	Variations of a Theme by Robert Schumann, Op. 20: Variation V	
7 Dec 2008	Janice Galloway	Handel	"Lascia Ch'Io Pianga" (from Rinaldo)	
7 Dec 2008	Janice Galloway	Jerry Leiber and Mike Stoller	"Hound Dog"	
7 Dec 2008	Janice Galloway	Mozart	"A cenar tteco" (from Don Giovanni, act 2, scene 5, finale)	
7 Dec 2008	Janice Galloway	Henry Purcell	"Music For a While" (from Oedipus)	
7 Dec 2008	Janice Galloway	Robert Schumann	"Chiarina" (from Carnaval, Op. 9)	
7 Dec 2008	Janice Galloway	Robert Schumann	Widmung (No. 1 from Myrthen, Op. 25)	
14 Dec 2008	Jan Pieńkowski	Chopin	Polonaise in A major, Op. 40, No. 1 "Military"	
14 Dec 2008	Jan Pieńkowski	John Lennon and Paul McCartney	"Lucy in the Sky with Diamonds"	
14 Dec 2008	Jan Pieńkowski	Polish Tune	"Infant Holy, Infant Lowly"	
14 Dec 2008	Jan Pieńkowski	Rachmaninov	Vocalise Op. 34, No. 14	
14 Dec 2008	Jan Pieńkowski	Traditional Sunday Vespers	The Magnificat	
14 Dec 2008	Jan Pieńkowski	Tadeusz Sygietyński and S. R. Dobrowolskiolski	Warszawski Dzień	
14 Dec 2008	Jan Pieńkowski	Tchaikovsky	Chinese Dance From 'The Nutcracker Suite'	
14 Dec 2008	Jan Pieńkowski	Tchaikovsky	Mazurka from Eugene Onegin (act 2)	
14 Dec 2008	Jan Pieńkowski	Verdi	"Rivedrai le foreste imbalsamate" from Aida, act 3	
28 Dec 2008	Sue Perkins	Britten	"Dies Irae" (from The Sinfonia Da Requiem)	
28 Dec 2008	Sue Perkins	Britten	Interlude and Balulalow (from A Ceremony Of Carols, Op. 28)	
28 Dec 2008	Sue Perkins	Britten	Sunday Morning and The Storm (from The 4 Sea Interludes from Peter Grimes)	
28 Dec 2008	Sue Perkins	Mozart	"Ach ich fühls..." (Pamina's aria from The Magic Flute, act 2)	
28 Dec 2008	Sue Perkins	Giovanni Battista Pergolesi	Stabat Mater and Quando Corpus (from The Stabat Mater)	
28 Dec 2008	Sue Perkins	Stravinsky	Finale from The Firebird Suite	

== 2009 ==
Date	Guest	Composer	Title	Performer, label
4 Jan 2009	Jonathan Dimbleby	Bach	Music from Part II of The St John Passion BWV 245	
4 Jan 2009	Jonathan Dimbleby	Beethoven	3rd movement 'Scherzo' from Symphony No. 7 in A major, Op. 92	
4 Jan 2009	Jonathan Dimbleby	Britten	"The Birth Of Nicholas" from St Nicholas	
4 Jan 2009	Jonathan Dimbleby	Mozart	1st movement from Piano Sonata in A major K331	
4 Jan 2009	Jonathan Dimbleby	N/A	Chanson Amhorique Classique Accomp On Masenqo	
4 Jan 2009	Jonathan Dimbleby	Verdi	"Ave Maria" from Otello	
11 Jan 2009	Kate O'Mara	Bach	Brandenburg Concerto No. 1 in F (1st movement, Allegro)	
11 Jan 2009	Kate O'Mara	Antonín Dvořák	"Silent Woods"	
11 Jan 2009	Kate O'Mara	George Butterworth	"The Banks of Green Willow" (Idyll for Small Orchestra)	
11 Jan 2009	Kate O'Mara	George Gershwin	"Lullaby"	
11 Jan 2009	Kate O'Mara	Percy Grainger	Rustic Dance (from Youthful Suite)	
11 Jan 2009	Kate O'Mara	Jan Dismas Zelenka	Fanfare in D major	
11 Jan 2009	Kate O'Mara	Marguerite Monnot and Georges Moustaki	Milord	
11 Jan 2009	Kate O'Mara	Shostakovich	Waltz (from Jazz Suite No. 2)	
18 Jan 2009	Carol Drinkwater	Bach	2nd movement from Concerto For 2 Violins BWV 1043	
18 Jan 2009	Carol Drinkwater	Federico García Lorca	"La Casada Infiel"	
18 Jan 2009	Carol Drinkwater	Mahler	"Youth" from Das Lied Von Der Erde	
18 Jan 2009	Carol Drinkwater	Miles Davis	"Generique" from Ascenseur pour l'échafaud	
18 Jan 2009	Carol Drinkwater	Nina Simone	"Ne Me Quitte Pas (If You Go Away)"	
18 Jan 2009	Carol Drinkwater	Oscar Peterson	"Laura"	
18 Jan 2009	Carol Drinkwater	The Doors	"Riders On the Storm" from The Doors Concerto	
18 Jan 2009	Carol Drinkwater	Bach	Prelude & Allemande from Cello Suite No. 1 in G major, BWV 1007	
25 Jan 2009	Tariq Ali	Baba Bulleh Shah	"Kee Jaana Mein Kaum Buleya" (from Kalam)	
25 Jan 2009	Tariq Ali	Billie Holiday	"Strange Fruit"	
25 Jan 2009	Tariq Ali	Gluck	"Che faro senza Euridice" (from Orfeo ed Euridice, act 3)	
25 Jan 2009	Tariq Ali	Hans Eisler and Bertolt Brecht	"Song of the Stimulating Impact of Cash"	
25 Jan 2009	Tariq Ali	Schubert	Symphony No. 9 in C, D944 (The "Great") (1st movement, Opening)	
25 Jan 2009	Tariq Ali	Shostakovich	Symphony No. 8 in C minor, Op. 65 (3rd movement, Allegro Non Troppo)	
25 Jan 2009	Tariq Ali	Tchaikovsky	Eugene Onegin (Tatiana's Rejection of Onegin at the end of the opera)	
8 Mar 2009	Clive Stafford Smith	Bach arr. Münchinger	"Jesu Joy of Man's Desiring" (from Cantata No. 147)	
8 Mar 2009	Clive Stafford Smith	Luther "Houserocker" Johnson	"Little Car Blues"	
8 Mar 2009	Clive Stafford Smith	Peter Gabriel	Biko	
8 Mar 2009	Clive Stafford Smith	Rossini	"Largo al factotum" (from The Barber of Seville, act 1, scene 1)	
8 Mar 2009	Clive Stafford Smith	The Proclaimers	"Sunshine on Leith"	
8 Mar 2009	Clive Stafford Smith	Thomas Tallis	"Spem In Alium"	
8 Mar 2009	Clive Stafford Smith	Traditional music	"Jesus Dropped the Charges"	
15 Mar 2009	Jane Asher	Beethoven	Symphony No. 5 (finale: Allegro)	
15 Mar 2009	Jane Asher	Donizetti	"Spargi d'amore pianto" (from Lucia Di Lammermoor, act 2)	
15 Mar 2009	Jane Asher	Gilbert And Sullivan	"When I Was A Lad I Served A Term" (H.M.S. Pinafore, act 1)	
15 Mar 2009	Jane Asher	Mozart	"Deh vieni non tardar" (from The Marriage of Figaro, act 4)	
15 Mar 2009	Jane Asher	Tchaikovsky	Symphony No. 4 (Finale: Allegro Con Fuoco)	
15 Mar 2009	Jane Asher	Mozart	Overture to Don Giovanni	
15 Mar 2009	Jane Asher	Mozart	"Lacrimosa" (from The Requiem, K626)	
22 Mar 2009	Terence Davies	Bernard Herrmann	Psycho - Opening Titles	
22 Mar 2009	Terence Davies	Bruckner	Symphony No. 9 in D minor (conclusion of 3rd movement)	
22 Mar 2009	Terence Davies	Arthur Freed and Nacio Herb Brown	"Singin' in the Rain"	
22 Mar 2009	Terence Davies	Rodgers and Hart	"Ten Cents A Dance"	
22 Mar 2009	Terence Davies	Schubert	Nacht und Träume, D. 827	
22 Mar 2009	Terence Davies	Shostakovich	Symphony No. 10 (opening of 1st movement)	
22 Mar 2009	Terence Davies	Jean Sibelius	Symphony No. 5 (opening of 3rd movement)	
22 Mar 2009	Terence Davies	Jule Styne and Stephen Sondheim	"You Gotta Have A Gimmick"	
22 Mar 2009	Terence Davies	Traditional music	"Blow The Wind Southerly"	
29 Mar 2009	Anthony Horowitz	Beethoven	Symphony No. 7 in A, Op. 92 (2nd movement – Allegretto)	
29 Mar 2009	Anthony Horowitz	Britten	Malo (from The Turn of the Screw, act 1, scene 6)	
29 Mar 2009	Anthony Horowitz	Chopin	Prelude in E minor, Op. 28/4	
29 Mar 2009	Anthony Horowitz	Chopin	Study in C, Op. 10/1	
29 Mar 2009	Anthony Horowitz	Philip Glass	Satyagraha (conclusion of act 3 excerpt)	
29 Mar 2009	Anthony Horowitz	Maurice Jarre	Lawrence of Arabia – Overture	
29 Mar 2009	Anthony Horowitz	Mozart	"Bisogna aver coraggio...Protegga il giusto cielo" (from Don Giovanni, act 1)	
29 Mar 2009	Anthony Horowitz	Puccini	"Tre Sbirri, Una Carrozza...Presto, Seguila" (from Tosca, act 1)	
29 Mar 2009	Anthony Horowitz	Rodgers and Hammerstein	"If I Loved You"	
5 Apr 2009	Marianne Faithfull	Bach	"Prelude" from Cello Suite No. 2 in D minor	
5 Apr 2009	Marianne Faithfull	Beethoven	3rd movement from Sonata for Violin and Piano, No. 9, Op. 47 "Kreutzer"	
5 Apr 2009	Marianne Faithfull	Leonard Bernstein	"Jet Song" from West Side Story	
5 Apr 2009	Marianne Faithfull	Bob Dylan	"She Belongs to Me"	
5 Apr 2009	Marianne Faithfull	John Coltrane	"My Favorite Things" (excerpt)	
5 Apr 2009	Marianne Faithfull	Marianne Faithfull	"Hold On Hold On" (excerpt)	
5 Apr 2009	Marianne Faithfull	Mozart	"Mi tradi quell' alma ingrata" from Don Giovanni act 2	
5 Apr 2009	Marianne Faithfull	Schubert	2nd movvement from Piano Trio No. 2 in E♭, D929	
26 Apr 2009	William Fiennes	Bach	Prelude No. 3 in C♯ major (from The Well-Tempered Clavier, Book II)	
26 Apr 2009	William Fiennes	Beethoven	String Quartet in A minor Op. 132 (excerpt 3rd movement, "Heiliger Dankgesang")	
26 Apr 2009	William Fiennes	Bob Dylan	"You're Gonna Make Me Lonesome When You Go" (from the album Blood On the Tracks)	
26 Apr 2009	William Fiennes	Anton Bruckner	Ave Maria	
26 Apr 2009	William Fiennes	Messiaen	"Louange à l'Immoralité de Jésus" (from The Quartet for the End of Time)	
26 Apr 2009	William Fiennes	Radiohead	Kid A	
26 Apr 2009	William Fiennes	Schubert	Piano Sonata in B♭, D960 (2nd movement: Andante Sostenuto)	
26 Apr 2009	William Fiennes	Shostakovich	Prelude No. 5 in D major (from 24 Preludes and Fugues)	
3 May 2009	Michael Pennington	Alaric Jans	"O Mistress Mine"	
3 May 2009	Michael Pennington	Bach	Chaconne (excerpt) (from Partita No. 2 in D minor	
3 May 2009	Michael Pennington	Britten	Elegy (from The Serenade for Tenor, Horn and Strings, Op. 31)	
3 May 2009	Michael Pennington	Joan Armatrading	"Willow"	
3 May 2009	Michael Pennington	Rachmaninov	"Lord, Now Lettest Thou Thy Servant Depart in Peace" (from The Vespers)	
3 May 2009	Michael Pennington	Richard Strauss	Morgen	
3 May 2009	Michael Pennington	Stravinsky	Sacrificial Dance (from The Rite of Spring)	
3 May 2009	Michael Pennington	Tim Hardin	"Hang On to a Dream" (recorded live at the 1973 Reading Festival)	
10 May 2009	Mendelssohn special (John Sessions)	Fanny Mendelssohn	Italien	
10 May 2009	Mendelssohn special (John Sessions)	Felix Mendelssohn	A Midsummer Night's Dream, Op. 61 - Overture (opening)	
10 May 2009	Mendelssohn special (John Sessions)	Felix Mendelssohn	Elijah, Op. 70 (conclusion)	
10 May 2009	Mendelssohn special (John Sessions)	Felix Mendelssohn	Elijah, Op. 70 (opening chorus)	
10 May 2009	Mendelssohn special (John Sessions)	Felix Mendelssohn	Octet in E♭, Op. 20 (opening of 1st movement)	
10 May 2009	Mendelssohn special (John Sessions)	Felix Mendelssohn	Overture - The Hebrides (Fingal's Cave), Op. 26 (Opening)	
10 May 2009	Mendelssohn special (John Sessions)	Felix Mendelssohn	Piano Concerto in G minor, Op. 25 (2nd movement - Andante - excerpt)	
10 May 2009	Mendelssohn special (John Sessions)	Felix Mendelssohn	Symphony No. 3 in A minor, Op. 56 - Scottish (Opening of 1st movement)	
17 May 2009	Fleur Adcock	Bessie Smith	"Nobody Knows You When You'te Down and Out"	
17 May 2009	Fleur Adcock	Britten	"Dirge" (from Serenade For Tenor, Horn and Strings)	
17 May 2009	Fleur Adcock	Gabriel Fauré	"In Paradisum" (from The Requiem, Op. 48)	
17 May 2009	Fleur Adcock	Gace Brulé	"A la Doucour de la Bele Seson"	
17 May 2009	Fleur Adcock	Gillian Whitehead	Hinetekakara	
17 May 2009	Fleur Adcock	Leoš Janáček	Sinfonietta (1st movement, Allegretto: Fanfare)	
17 May 2009	Fleur Adcock	Kurt Weill	"Mack the Knife" (from The Threepenny Opera) (recorded 28 September 1955)	
17 May 2009	Fleur Adcock	Monteverdi	"Nisi Dominus" (from The Vespers of 1610)	
17 May 2009	Fleur Adcock	Henry Purcell	"Nymphs and Shepherds"	
24 May 2009	James Le Fanu	Bach	Sonata for Violin and Keyboard, No. 2 in A major, BWV 1015 (2nd movement, Allegro assai)	
24 May 2009	James Le Fanu	Beethoven	Symphony No. 1 in C, Op. 21 (4th movement)	
24 May 2009	James Le Fanu	William Byrd	"Agnus Dei" (from The Mass For Four Voices)	
24 May 2009	James Le Fanu	César Franck	Violin Sonata in A (4th movement, Allegretto Poco Mosso)	
24 May 2009	James Le Fanu	Haydn	The Creation (Duet and Chorus, By Thee with Bliss)	
24 May 2009	James Le Fanu	Janis Joplin	"Cry Baby"	
24 May 2009	James Le Fanu	Robert Schumann	Wanderlied (No. 12 from Gedichte Op. 35)	
24 May 2009	James Le Fanu	Shostakovich	String Quartet No. 8 in C minor, Op. 110 (2nd movement, Allegro Molto)	
7 Jun 2009	Jasper Conran	Bessie Smith	"You Gotta Give Me Some"	
7 Jun 2009	Jasper Conran	Cat Stevens	"Morning Has Broken"	
7 Jun 2009	Jasper Conran	Chopin	Waltz in G♭ major, Op. 70, No. 1	
7 Jun 2009	Jasper Conran	Elizabeth Welch	"Stormy Weather"	
7 Jun 2009	Jasper Conran	Ella Fitzgerald	"Undecided"	
7 Jun 2009	Jasper Conran	Handel	"Comfort Ye My People" (from Messiah)	
7 Jun 2009	Jasper Conran	Handel	"Where'er You Walk" (Semele, act 2, scene 3)	
7 Jun 2009	Jasper Conran	Mozart	Laudate Dominum (from Vesperae Solennes De Confessore, K339)	
7 Jun 2009	Jasper Conran	Schubert	Impromptu in A♭, D899 No. 4	
7 Jun 2009	Jasper Conran	Traditional music	"Blow The Wind Southerly"	
14 Jun 2009	Penelope Wilton	Blossom Dearie	"I'm Hip"	
14 Jun 2009	Penelope Wilton	Brahms	Symphony No. 3 in F major (3rd movement, Poco allegretto)	
14 Jun 2009	Penelope Wilton	Debussy	Quartet in G minor (3rd movement, Andantino, Doucement Expressif))	
14 Jun 2009	Penelope Wilton	Antonín Dvořák	Cello Concerto (1st movement, Allegro, excerpt)	
14 Jun 2009	Penelope Wilton	Ella Fitzgerald	"Bewitched, Bothered and Bewildered"	
14 Jun 2009	Penelope Wilton	Kurt Weill	"Speak Low" (from One Touch of Venus)	
14 Jun 2009	Penelope Wilton	Sergei Prokofiev	Symphony No. 1 in D, Op. 25 (Classical) (first movement, Allegro)	
21 Jun 2009	Michael Portillo	Manuel De Falla	"El Amor Brujo" (The Dance of the Game of Love: The Last Section)	
21 Jun 2009	Michael Portillo	Puccini	The end of act 1 of Tosca	
21 Jun 2009	Michael Portillo	Richard Strauss	"Frühling" (first of the Four Last Songs)	
21 Jun 2009	Michael Portillo	Schubert	String Quartet in A minor, D804 (3rd movement: Menuetto, Allegretto)	
21 Jun 2009	Michael Portillo	Shostakovich	Symphony No. 13 Babi Yar (excerpt from 4th movement Fears, Beginning "Eta Stala Sevodnya Dalyokim…")	
21 Jun 2009	Michael Portillo	Jean Sibelius	Symphony 4 in A minor, Op. 63 (Last movement, Allegro)	
21 Jun 2009	Michael Portillo	Wagner	Part of Wotan's Lament from Die Walküre, act 2, scene 2	
28 Jun 2009	Amit Chaudhuri	Beethoven	Piano Sonata in C minor, Op. 13 ("Pathétique") (1st movement, excerpt)	
28 Jun 2009	Amit Chaudhuri	Bijoya Chaudhuri	"Esho Nipabane" (Tagore)	
28 Jun 2009	Amit Chaudhuri	Joni Mitchell	Hejira	
28 Jun 2009	Amit Chaudhuri	Joaquín Rodrigo arr. Gil Evans	"Concierto De Aranjuez" from Sketches of Spain	Miles Davis
28 Jun 2009	Amit Chaudhuri	Subinoy Roy	"Bahe Nirantara Ananta" (Tagore)	
28 Jun 2009	Amit Chaudhuri	Traditional music	"Raga Kalavati"	
28 Jun 2009	Amit Chaudhuri	William Bolcom	"The Lamb & the Shepherd" (Songs of Innocence and Experience)	
5 Jul 2009	Jeremy Northam	Bach	Prelude and Fugue in F (Well Tempered Clavier, Book 1)	
5 Jul 2009	Jeremy Northam	Earl Hines and Billy Taylor	"Sweet Lorraine"	
5 Jul 2009	Jeremy Northam	George and Ira Gershwin	"How Long Has This Been Going On?"	
5 Jul 2009	Jeremy Northam	Leoš Janáček	The Cunning Little Vixen	
5 Jul 2009	Jeremy Northam	Keith Jarrett	"Time on My Hands"	
5 Jul 2009	Jeremy Northam	Mahler	Symphony No. 5 (2nd movement: Stürmisch Bewegt, Excerpt)	
5 Jul 2009	Jeremy Northam	Puccini	"Dunque è proprio finita" (La bohème, love duet from the end of act 3)	
5 Jul 2009	Jeremy Northam	Schubert	Piano Trio in B♭, D898 [1st movement, Allegro Moderato]	
5 Jul 2009	Jeremy Northam	Victor Young and Ned Washington	"My Foolish Heart"	
12 Jul 2009	Richard Hudson	Bach	Concerto in G minor, BWV 975 (1st movement - Allegro)	
12 Jul 2009	Richard Hudson	Mozart	"Canzonetta sull'aria" (from Le nozze di Figaro, act 3)	
12 Jul 2009	Richard Hudson	Cole Porter	"Ev'ry Time We Say Goodbye"	
12 Jul 2009	Richard Hudson	Jimmy Somerville and Richard Coles	"So Cold the Night"	
12 Jul 2009	Richard Hudson	Tchaikovsky	Pas De Deux - Intrada (from The Nutcracker, act 2, Op. 71)	
12 Jul 2009	Richard Hudson	Traditional arr. George Fenton	"Nkosi Sikeleli Afrika"	
12 Jul 2009	Richard Hudson	Vivaldi	"Cessate, Omai Cessate...Ah, Ch'Infelice Sempre" (from Cessate, Omai Cessate, Rv 684)	
12 Jul 2009	Richard Hudson	Judith Weir	Second act of the Chao Family Orphan (from A Night at the Chinese Opera, act 2)	
19 Jul 2009	Sarah Dunant	Bach	Prelude from Cello Suite in C, BWV 1009	
19 Jul 2009	Sarah Dunant	Dark City Sisters	"Sekusile"	
19 Jul 2009	Sarah Dunant	Leonard Cohen	"Ain't No Cure for Love"	
19 Jul 2009	Sarah Dunant	Lucinda Williams	"Righteously"	
19 Jul 2009	Sarah Dunant	Michelle Shocked	"Anchorage"	
19 Jul 2009	Sarah Dunant	Giovanni Pierluigi Da Palestrina	Lesson One (Lamentations of Jeremiah)	
19 Jul 2009	Sarah Dunant	Schubert	Piano Sonata in B♭, D960 (II. Andante Sostenuto)	
19 Jul 2009	Sarah Dunant	Van Morrison	"In the Garden" [Van Morrison]/"You Send Me" [Sam Cooke]	
6 Sep 2009	Anthony Bolton	Anthony Bolton	"A Kiss for the Baby" (from A Garland Of Carols)	
6 Sep 2009	Anthony Bolton	Britten	Elegy (from The Serenade for Tenor, Horn and Strings)	
6 Sep 2009	Anthony Bolton	Joni Mitchell	"The Silky Veils Of Ardor" (from Don Juan's Reckless Daughter)	
6 Sep 2009	Anthony Bolton	Mahler	Symphony No. 2 (Resurrection) (excerpt from the 5th movement)	
6 Sep 2009	Anthony Bolton	Mozart	"Soave sia il vento" (from Così fan tutte, act 1, scene 2)	
6 Sep 2009	Anthony Bolton	Richard Strauss	Part of the presentation of the Silver Rose (Der Rosenkavalier, act 2)	
6 Sep 2009	Anthony Bolton	Thomas Adès	What Was Before... (from The Tempest, the love duet from act 2, scene 4)	
13 Sep 2009	Imogen Stubbs	Britten	Corpus Christi Carol	
13 Sep 2009	Imogen Stubbs	Brahms	Piano Concerto No. 1 in D minor, Op. 15 (II. Adagio)	
13 Sep 2009	Imogen Stubbs	Gene Kelly	"Singin' in the Rain"	
13 Sep 2009	Imogen Stubbs	Georges Delerue	"Ashton's Son" (main theme music from the film A Summer Story)	
13 Sep 2009	Imogen Stubbs	George Gershwin	"Oh Lord I'm On My Way" from Porgy and Bess	
13 Sep 2009	Imogen Stubbs	Sergei Prokofiev	Juliet's Death (from Romeo and Juliet act 4)	
13 Sep 2009	Imogen Stubbs	Henry Purcell	"An Evening Hymn"	
13 Sep 2009	Imogen Stubbs	Shaun Davey	The Relief of Derry Symphony (excerpt from 4th movement, The Hymn To Peace)	
13 Sep 2009	Imogen Stubbs	Tchaikovsky	June (Barcarolle) from The Seasons	
20 Sep 2009	Mark Haddon	Traditional arr. Britten	"Tom Bowling"	
20 Sep 2009	Mark Haddon	Autechre	"Plyphon" (from the album Quaristice)	
20 Sep 2009	Mark Haddon	David Raksin	"Laura"	
20 Sep 2009	Mark Haddon	Elliott Carter	Oboe Quartet (opening)	
20 Sep 2009	Mark Haddon	Kate Rusby	"My Young Man"	
20 Sep 2009	Mark Haddon	Mozart	Piano Sonata in C, K. 545, "Sonata Facile" (1st movement, Allegro)	
20 Sep 2009	Mark Haddon	Sonic Youth	"Kool Thing" (from the album Goo)	
20 Sep 2009	Mark Haddon	Steve Reich	"Pulse" (from Music for 18 Musicians)	
27 Sep 2009	Hanan al-Shaykh	Albinoni	Adagio in G minor	
27 Sep 2009	Hanan al-Shaykh	Anouar Brahem	"Parfum de Gitane"	
27 Sep 2009	Hanan al-Shaykh	Bach	3rd movement "Allegro" from Keyboard Concerto No. 1 in D minorm BWV 1052	
27 Sep 2009	Hanan al-Shaykh	Billie Holiday	"Strange Fruit". Rec. 1956	
27 Sep 2009	Hanan al-Shaykh	Fairuz	"Wa Habibi"	
27 Sep 2009	Hanan al-Shaykh	Jimmy Lunceford	"Rhythm Is Our Business"	
27 Sep 2009	Hanan al-Shaykh	Philip Glass	"Temple of the Golden Pavilion" from Mishima	
27 Sep 2009	Hanan al-Shaykh	Schubert	"Der Zwerg"	
4 Oct 2009	Christopher Wynn Parry	Anonymous work	Sanctus (from the Ivrea Codex)	
4 Oct 2009	Christopher Wynn Parry	Bach	Partita No. 1 in B♭, BWV 825 (5th & 6th movements - Menuets I and II & Gigue)	
4 Oct 2009	Christopher Wynn Parry	William Byrd	"Agnus Dei" (from Mass for Five Voices)	
4 Oct 2009	Christopher Wynn Parry	Handel	"La Réjouissance" (from Music for the Royal Fireworks)	
4 Oct 2009	Christopher Wynn Parry	Monteverdi	"Nisi Dominus" (from Messa E Salmi)	
4 Oct 2009	Christopher Wynn Parry	Mozart	Serenade in B♭, K. 361 (4th movement - Menuetto. Allegretto - Trio I and II)	
4 Oct 2009	Christopher Wynn Parry	Stravinsky	Apollon Musagète (Coda and Apothéose)	
11 Oct 2009	Paul McKenna	Bizet	4th movement from Symphony in C	
11 Oct 2009	Paul McKenna	Donny Hathaway	"A Song for You"	
11 Oct 2009	Paul McKenna	Max Steiner	"A Summer Place"	
11 Oct 2009	Paul McKenna	Mozart	Overture to The Marriage of Figaro	
11 Oct 2009	Paul McKenna	Pat Metheny	"To the End of the World"	
11 Oct 2009	Paul McKenna	Rossini	"Finale" from William Tell Overture	
11 Oct 2009	Paul McKenna	Wagner	Prelude to Die Meistersinger Von Nürnberg	
18 Oct 2009	Ian Rankin	Alan Stivell	Ys (Excerpt - Var On Folk Theme Gwerz Kér-Ys)	
18 Oct 2009	Ian Rankin	Bach	Prelude and Fugue No. 1 in C major, BWV 846 from The Well Tempered Clavier	
18 Oct 2009	Ian Rankin	Coleman Hawkins	"Love Song" from Apache	
18 Oct 2009	Ian Rankin	Michael Nyman	"Gliding" from Water Dances	
18 Oct 2009	Ian Rankin	Mozart	1st movement from Piano Sonata in C (Kv309)	
18 Oct 2009	Ian Rankin	Vivaldi	1st movement "Largo" from Cello Sonata No. 1 in B♭ major	
18 Oct 2009	Ian Rankin	Vladimir Cosma	"Promenade Sentimentale" from the soundtrack of Diva	
18 Oct 2009	Ian Rankin	Mozart	Requiem Aeternam (from Requiem in D minor K. 626)	
25 Oct 2009	Stewart Copeland	Steve Cropper, Booker T. Jones, Lewie Steinberg, Al Jackson Jr.	Green Onions	Booker T. & the M.G.'s
25 Oct 2009	Stewart Copeland	Desmond Dekker	"Israelites"	
25 Oct 2009	Stewart Copeland	John Adams	"Loops and Verses" from Shaker Loops	
25 Oct 2009	Stewart Copeland	Moondog	"Bird's Lament"	
25 Oct 2009	Stewart Copeland	Paul Simon	"Diamonds on the Soles of Her Shoes"	
25 Oct 2009	Stewart Copeland	Ravel	Prélude From Le Tombeau De Couperin	
25 Oct 2009	Stewart Copeland	Stewart Copeland	Gene Pool (excerpt)	
25 Oct 2009	Stewart Copeland	Wagner	Overture To Tannhäuser	
1 Nov 2009	John Stefanidis	Beethoven	Fugue from 3rd movement of Sonata No. 31 in A♭, Op. 110	
1 Nov 2009	John Stefanidis	Brahms	3rd movement from Cello Sonata No. 1 in E minor Op. 38	
1 Nov 2009	John Stefanidis	Korngold	"Glück, Das Mir Verblieb" (Marietta's Song) from Die Tote Stadt	
1 Nov 2009	John Stefanidis	Mozart	"Vorrei Spiegarvi, Oh Dio!" K418	
1 Nov 2009	John Stefanidis	Ravi Shankar	"Gat In Fast Ek Taal"	
1 Nov 2009	John Stefanidis	Rossini	Bel Raggio Lusinghier' from Semiramide act 1	
1 Nov 2009	John Stefanidis	Tchaikovsky	"Polonaise" from act 3, scene 1, of Eugene Onegin	
8 Nov 2009	Vincent Cable	Anton Pann	"Tatal Nostru"	
8 Nov 2009	Vincent Cable	Vincenzo Bellini	"Ah! Per Sempre Io Ti Perdei" (from I Puritani, act 1)	
8 Nov 2009	Vincent Cable	Geoffrey Bowyer	"Requiem Aeternam" (from Pilgrim's Requiem)	
8 Nov 2009	Vincent Cable	Mozart	"Dalla sua pace" (from Don Giovanni, act 1)	
8 Nov 2009	Vincent Cable	Richard Strauss	"Beim Schlafengehen" (from The Four Last Songs)	
8 Nov 2009	Vincent Cable	Verdi	Ingemisco (from The Requiem)	
8 Nov 2009	Vincent Cable	Mozart	"O Isis und Osiris" (from Die Zauberflöte, act 2)	
8 Nov 2009	Vincent Cable	Mozart	Romance (2nd movement from the Piano Concerto No. 20 in D minor, K. 466)	
15 Nov 2009	Jason Rebello	Al Jarreau	"Not Like This"	
15 Nov 2009	Jason Rebello	Béla Bartók	1st movement from Music for Strings, Percussion and Celesta Sz 106	
15 Nov 2009	Jason Rebello	Beethoven	3rd movement from Piano Sonata No. 31 in A♭, Op. 110	
15 Nov 2009	Jason Rebello	Duruflé	Agnus Dei from Requiem Op. 9	
15 Nov 2009	Jason Rebello	Jason Rebello	Cramp Twins	
15 Nov 2009	Jason Rebello	Keith Jarrett	"Somewhere Over the Rainbow"	
15 Nov 2009	Jason Rebello	Ravel	"Ondine" from Gaspard de la Nuit	
22 Nov 2009	Deborah Warner	Alban Berg	Wozzeck : act III, scenes 2–3 transition	
22 Nov 2009	Deborah Warner	Handel	"He Shall Feed His Flock" from Messiah	
22 Nov 2009	Deborah Warner	Irish Tune arr. Britten	"The Salley Gardens"	
22 Nov 2009	Deborah Warner	Lewis Carroll	The Door Led Right into a Kitchen from Alice In Wonderland	
22 Nov 2009	Deborah Warner	Mozart	Opening from act 1, Don Giovanni	
22 Nov 2009	Deborah Warner	Henry Purcell	Overture & "When I Am Laid In Earth" from Dido & Aeneas	
22 Nov 2009	Deborah Warner	Schubert	Impromptu No. 3 in G♭ (Op. 90 D899)	
22 Nov 2009	Deborah Warner	Traditional music	"Once in Royal David's City"	
29 Nov 2009	Bill Bailey	Bach	Prelude and Fugue In B♭, BWV 866 (from The Well-Tempered Clavier, Book I)	
29 Nov 2009	Bill Bailey	Beethoven	Piano Sonata in C minor, Op. 10/1 (1st movement – Allegro molto e con brio)	
29 Nov 2009	Bill Bailey	Debussy	Arabesque No. 1	
29 Nov 2009	Bill Bailey	Grieg	Piano Concerto in A minor, Op. 16 (opening of 1st movement - Allegro Molto Moderato)	
29 Nov 2009	Bill Bailey	Mozart	"Dies Irae" (from Requiem, K. 626)	
29 Nov 2009	Bill Bailey	Jean Sibelius	Intermezzo (from Karelia Suite, Op. 11)	
29 Nov 2009	Bill Bailey	William Walton	"Praise Ye the God of Gold" (from Belshazzar's Feast)	
29 Nov 2009	Bill Bailey	Mozart	Piano Concerto in D, K. 537 - Coronation (opening of 1st movement - Allegro)	
6 Dec 2009	M. J. Cole	John Adams	Short Ride in a Fast Machine	
6 Dec 2009	M. J. Cole	Michael Andrews	"Carpathian Ridge" from Donnie Darko soundtrack	
6 Dec 2009	M. J. Cole	M. J. Cole	"Sincere" (excerpt)	
6 Dec 2009	M. J. Cole	Sergei Prokofiev	Toccata Op. 11	
6 Dec 2009	M. J. Cole	Rachmaninov	Prelude in C♯ minor (Op. 3, No. 2)	
6 Dec 2009	M. J. Cole	Radiohead	"Nude"	
6 Dec 2009	M. J. Cole	Ravel	2nd movement from String Quartet in F	
6 Dec 2009	M. J. Cole	Sting	"Bring On the Night"/"When the World Is Running Down" (Live)	
6 Dec 2009	M. J. Cole	Tchaikovsky	3rd movement from Piano Concerto No. 1 in B♭ minor, Op. 23	
13 Dec 2009	Sam Taylor-Wood	Beethoven	1st movement from Symphony No. 9 in D minor, Op. 125	
13 Dec 2009	Sam Taylor-Wood	Gluck	"Ah! Se Intorno A Quest'Urna Funesta" from Orfeo ed Euridice	
13 Dec 2009	Sam Taylor-Wood	John Lennon	"Love"	
13 Dec 2009	Sam Taylor-Wood	Michael Nyman	"The Heart Asks Pleasure First" from The Piano	
13 Dec 2009	Sam Taylor-Wood	Mozart	Introitus from Requiem in D minor, K. 626	
13 Dec 2009	Sam Taylor-Wood	Nina Simone	"Wild Is the Wind"	
13 Dec 2009	Sam Taylor-Wood	Ravi Shankar	"Prabhãti"	
13 Dec 2009	Sam Taylor-Wood	Ry Cooder	Paris, Texas	
27 Dec 2009	Michael Morpurgo	Bach	Chorus: Jauchzet, frohlocket! Auf, preiset die Tage (The Christmas Oratorio)	
27 Dec 2009	Michael Morpurgo	Beethoven	Symphony No. 6 in F, Op. 68 ("Pastoral") (3rd movement – Peasants' Merrymaking)	
27 Dec 2009	Michael Morpurgo	Elgar	"Nimrod" (Variations on an Original Theme, Op. 36 - Enigma)	
27 Dec 2009	Michael Morpurgo	Handel	"Where'er You Walk" (Semele, act 2, scene 3)	
27 Dec 2009	Michael Morpurgo	Mozart	Piano Sonata in A K331 (1st movement: Andante Grazioso - Theme Only)	
27 Dec 2009	Michael Morpurgo	Henry Purcell	"Sound the Trumpet" (Come Ye Sons o Art Away)	
27 Dec 2009	Michael Morpurgo	Henry Purcell	"Fairest Isle" (King Arthur)	
27 Dec 2009	Michael Morpurgo	Thomas Tallis	Spem in Alium (excerpt)	
27 Dec 2009	Michael Morpurgo	Vivaldi	Concerto in D for Lute, Strings and Continuo, Rv93 (1st movement - Allegro)	
27 Dec 2009	Michael Morpurgo	Beethoven	Violin Concerto in D, Op. 61 (1st movement, excerpt)	
