= List of Private Passions episodes (2010–2014) =

This is a list of Private Passions episodes from 2010 to 2014. It does not include repeated episodes or compilations.

== 2010 ==
Date	Guest	Composer	Title	Performer / Label
3 Jan 2010	Katie Mitchell	Johann Sebastian Bach	"Erbarme dich" (St Matthew Passion, Part 2)	
3 Jan 2010	Katie Mitchell	Ludwig van Beethoven	String Quartet in A minor, Op. 132 (Finale: Allegro Appassionato)	
3 Jan 2010	Katie Mitchell	Leoš Janáček	String Quartet No. 1 ("The Kreutzer Sonata") – 4th movement	
3 Jan 2010	Katie Mitchell	Luigi Nono	Al gran sole carico d'amore (In the Bright Sunshine Heavy with Love) Part II: Tempo – Scena 2	
3 Jan 2010	Katie Mitchell	Paul Clark	"Waves Music"	
3 Jan 2010	Katie Mitchell	Alfred Schnittke	"Stille Nacht", arrangement for violin and piano	
3 Jan 2010	Katie Mitchell	Franz Schubert	"Nacht und Träume"	
3 Jan 2010	Katie Mitchell	Bach	[[Prelude and Fugue in A♭ major, BWV 862]] (The Well-Tempered Clavier, Book 1)	
10 Jan 2010	Leslie Caron	Bach	Bourrées 1 and 2 (Cello Suite in C, BWV 1009)	
10 Jan 2010	Leslie Caron	Frank Loesser	"Baby It's Cold Outside"	
10 Jan 2010	Leslie Caron	George Gershwin	An American In Paris	
10 Jan 2010	Leslie Caron	Kurt Weill	"Alabama Song" (Rise and Fall of the State of Mahagonny)	
10 Jan 2010	Leslie Caron	Henri Sauguet	Les Forains (Petite Fille a la Chaise and Galop Final)	
10 Jan 2010	Leslie Caron	Stephen Sondheim	"A Weekend in the Country" (A Little Night Music)	
10 Jan 2010	Leslie Caron	Igor Stravinsky	Petrushka (Scene 3 – At The Moor's House)	
10 Jan 2010	Leslie Caron	Yves Montand	"La Bicyclette" (Pierre Barouh/Francis Lai)	
17 Jan 2010	Philip Campbell	Bach	Goldberg Variations (Variations 20 and 21)	
17 Jan 2010	Philip Campbell	William Byrd	Agnus Dei (Mass in Four Parts)	
17 Jan 2010	Philip Campbell	Claude Debussy	Etude Pour les Quartes	
17 Jan 2010	Philip Campbell	George Gershwin	"They Can't Take That Away from Me"	
17 Jan 2010	Philip Campbell	Jonathan Harvey	Ashes Dance Back	
17 Jan 2010	Philip Campbell	Led Zeppelin	"Good Times Bad Times"	
17 Jan 2010	Philip Campbell	Olivier Messiaen	Transports de Joie (L'Ascension)	
17 Jan 2010	Philip Campbell	Arnold Schoenberg	"Peripetia" (Five Pieces for Orchestra, Op. 16)	
17 Jan 2010	Philip Campbell	Michael Tippett	Ritual Dances (The Midsummer Marriage: Prelude and First Transformation)	
24 Jan 2010	Fiona Reynolds	Bach	Brandenburg Concerto No. 3 in G (1st movement Allegro Moderato)	
24 Jan 2010	Fiona Reynolds	Edward Elgar	Introduction and Allegro	
24 Jan 2010	Fiona Reynolds	Gerald Finzi	"The Salutation" (Dies Natalis)	
24 Jan 2010	Fiona Reynolds	Leoš Janáček	"To Jste Si Vymyslily Peknou Vec!" (Káťa Kabanová, the end of act 2)	
24 Jan 2010	Fiona Reynolds	Mozart	Sinfonia Concertante in E♭, K364 (3rd movement Presto, excerpt)	
24 Jan 2010	Fiona Reynolds	Dmitri Shostakovich	Piano Concerto No. 2 (2nd movement Andante)	
24 Jan 2010	Fiona Reynolds	Bedřich Smetana	String Quartet in E minor (From My Life) (1st movement: Allegro vivo appassionato)	
28 Feb 2010	Frieda Hughes	AC/DC	"Rock 'n' Roll Train" (from the album Black Ice)	
28 Feb 2010	Frieda Hughes	Anonymous work	"The Humours of Ballyloughlin"	
28 Feb 2010	Frieda Hughes	Beethoven	"Für Elise"	
28 Feb 2010	Frieda Hughes	Chopin	Preludes Nos 3, 7 and 8 (from The Preludes, Op. 28)	
28 Feb 2010	Frieda Hughes	Frieda Hughes	Reading: Doll from The Book of Mirrors (Bloodaxe)	
28 Feb 2010	Frieda Hughes	Frieda Hughes	Reading: For Nick from The Book of Mirrors (Bloodaxe)	
28 Feb 2010	Frieda Hughes	Gustav Holst	Mars (from The Planets)	
28 Feb 2010	Frieda Hughes	Laura Sullivan	"Hawaiian Islands" (from the album Mystical America)	
28 Feb 2010	Frieda Hughes	John Tavener	The Protecting Veil	
28 Feb 2010	Frieda Hughes	Vivaldi	Spring (from The Four Seasons) (1st movement, Allegro) [Concerto in E major, Rv 269]	
7 Mar 2010	Mark Gatiss	Leonard Bernstein	"Make Our Garden Grow" (from Candide)	
7 Mar 2010	Mark Gatiss	Cole Porter	"So in Love" (from Kiss Me, Kate)	
7 Mar 2010	Mark Gatiss	Eden Ahbez	"Nature Boy"	
7 Mar 2010	Mark Gatiss	Miklós Rózsa	"Auf Wiedersehen" (from The Private Life of Sherlock Holmes)	
7 Mar 2010	Mark Gatiss	Jacques Offenbach	Barcarolle (Prelude to act 4 from The Tales of Hoffmann)	
7 Mar 2010	Mark Gatiss	Henry Purcell	"What Power Art Thou?" (The Cold Genius from King Arthur, act 3)	
7 Mar 2010	Mark Gatiss	Ralph Vaughan Williams	Symphony No. 6 in E minor (1st movement, Allegro)	
7 Mar 2010	Mark Gatiss	Wagner	"Liebestod" (from Tristan und Isolde, act 3)	
14 Mar 2010	Lee Hall	Attributed to John Hall of Sheffield Park	"Hark! Hark! What News"	
14 Mar 2010	Lee Hall	Conlon Nancarrow	Study for Player Piano No. 6	
14 Mar 2010	Lee Hall	Harvey Brough	Lux Aeterna (from Requiem in Blue)	
14 Mar 2010	Lee Hall	John Coltrane	Ascension (the opening)	
14 Mar 2010	Lee Hall	Messiaen	"Louange de L'Immortalité de Jésus" (from The Quartet for the End Of Time)	
14 Mar 2010	Lee Hall	Mieczysław Weinberg	Prelude No. 1 (from 24 Preludes, Op. 100)	
14 Mar 2010	Lee Hall	Henry Purcell	"Music for a While" (from Oedipus)	
14 Mar 2010	Lee Hall	Robert Schumann	"Im ruhigen Tempo" (No. 1 from Gesänge der Frühe, O. 133)	
14 Mar 2010	Lee Hall	Traditional music	"Bonnie Jeannie o Bethelnie" (also known as "Glenlogie")	
14 Mar 2010	Lee Hall	Traditional music	"Ma Bonney Lad"	
21 Mar 2010	Gareth Malone	Leonard Bernstein	Part 3 of Chichester Psalms	
21 Mar 2010	Gareth Malone	William Byrd	"Iustorum Animae"	
21 Mar 2010	Gareth Malone	Gerald Finzi	"Come Away, Come Away, Death" from Let Us Garlands Bring (Op. 18)	
21 Mar 2010	Gareth Malone	Mozart	"Ah, perdona al primo affetto" from La clemenza di Tito	
21 Mar 2010	Gareth Malone	Robert Schumann	"Mit Myrten und Rosen" from Liederkreis (Op. 24)	
21 Mar 2010	Gareth Malone	Shostakovich	2nd movement "Allegretto" from Symphony No. 5 in D minor (Op. 47)	
21 Mar 2010	Gareth Malone	Stravinsky	"I Go, I Go to Him" from The Rake's Progress, act 1, scene 3	
21 Mar 2010	Gareth Malone	Ralph Vaughan Williams	A Sea Symphony (Symphony No. 1)	
4 Apr 2010	Bernard Longley	Arnold Bax	Third Symphony (Epilogue to the 3rd movement, Finale)	
4 Apr 2010	Bernard Longley	Alexander Borodin	String Quartet No. 2 in D major (3rd movement, Notturno)	
4 Apr 2010	Bernard Longley	Elgar	Sanctus Fortis (from The Dream of Gerontius)	
4 Apr 2010	Bernard Longley	Messiaen	O sacrum convivium!	
4 Apr 2010	Bernard Longley	Francis Poulenc	Dialogues des Carmélites (act 3, tableau 4, Place de la Révolution)	
4 Apr 2010	Bernard Longley	Ralph Vaughan Williams	Mass in G (Kyrie)	
4 Apr 2010	Bernard Longley	Verdi	Rex Tremendae (includes "Salva Me") (from The Requiem)	
11 Apr 2010	Alistair McGowan	Chopin	Nocturne in D♭, Op. 27/2	
11 Apr 2010	Alistair McGowan	Grieg	"Solveig's Song" (from Peer Gynt, Op. 23)	
11 Apr 2010	Alistair McGowan	John Kander and Fred Ebb	"It Couldn't Please Me More" (from Cabaret)	
11 Apr 2010	Alistair McGowan	Rachmaninov	Prelude in G minor, Op. 23/5	
11 Apr 2010	Alistair McGowan	Nikolai Rimsky-Korsakov	Scheherazade, Op. 35 (3rd movement – The Young Prince and Princess)	
11 Apr 2010	Alistair McGowan	Erik Satie	Gnossienne No. 3	
11 Apr 2010	Alistair McGowan	Shostakovich	Waltz 2 (from Jazz Suite No. 2)	
11 Apr 2010	Alistair McGowan	Marcel Zidani	Prelude	
18 Apr 2010	Edmund de Waal	Bach	"Ich Habe Genug" (BWV 82)	
18 Apr 2010	Edmund de Waal	Brian Eno	"This" from Another Day on Earth	
18 Apr 2010	Edmund de Waal	Britten	Prologue & Pastoral from Serenade for Tenor, Horn and Strings (Op. 31)	
18 Apr 2010	Edmund de Waal	Carlo Gesualdo	Alieni Insurrexerunt from Tenebrae Responses	
18 Apr 2010	Edmund de Waal	John Adams	"A Final Shaking" from Shaker Loops	
18 Apr 2010	Edmund de Waal	Moby	"Porcelain"	
18 Apr 2010	Edmund de Waal	Mozart	1st movement from Sonata in A K331	
18 Apr 2010	Edmund de Waal	Orlando Gibbons	Magnificat from the 2nd Service	
25 Apr 2010	Joanne Harris	Ennio Morricone	Theme from The Good, The Bad and the Ugly	
25 Apr 2010	Joanne Harris	Grieg	"In the Hall of the Mountain King" (from Peer Gynt)	
25 Apr 2010	Joanne Harris	Mahler	Symphony No. 1 in D (1st movement excerpt)	
25 Apr 2010	Joanne Harris	Rachmaninov	Prelude in C♯ minor, Op. 3, No. 2	
25 Apr 2010	Joanne Harris	Schubert	Piano Trio in E♭, D929 (2nd movement, Andante Con Moto)	
25 Apr 2010	Joanne Harris	Bedřich Smetana	Vltava (from Ma Vlast)	
9 May 2010	Philip Ball	Béla Bartók	Piano Concerto No. 2 (3rd movement, Allegro Molto)	Sviatoslav Richter (piano), Orchestre de Paris/Lorin Maazel
9 May 2010	Philip Ball	Duke Ellington	"Cotton Tail"	Duke Ellington Label: SHOUT FACTORY 37470.
9 May 2010	Philip Ball	Sergei Prokofiev	Sonata No. 7 in B♭, Op. 83 (1st movement Allegro inquieto – Andantino)	Maurizio Pollini (piano) Label: DG 447 4312.
9 May 2010	Philip Ball	Bach	Prelude in E♭ minor (from The Well-Tempered Clavier, Book I)	Angela Hewitt (piano) Label: HYPERION CDS 44291.
9 May 2010	Philip Ball	Déodat de Séverac	Dunántúli Ugrósok	Muzsikás Label: HANNIBAL HNCD 1439.
9 May 2010	Philip Ball	Tom Waits	"Telephone Call from Istanbul" (from Franks Wild Years)	Tom Waits Label: ISLAND 4235723.
9 May 2010	Philip Ball	Paul Hindemith	Interlude in A♭ (No. 15 from Ludus Tonalis)	John McCabe (piano) Label: HYPERION CDA 66824.
9 May 2010	Philip Ball	Stravinsky	Tango	James Crabb and Geir Draugsvoll (accordions) Label: EMI 569705-2.
16 May 2010	John Adams	John Adams	"News has a kind of mystery" from Nixon in China (act 1, scene 1)	James Maddalena (Nixon), Orchestra of St Lukes/Edo de Waart Label: NONESUCH 79177.
16 May 2010	John Adams	John Philip Sousa	"The Stars and Stripes Forever"	United States Airforce Band of the Golden West/Douglas Monroe Label: Altissimo 75442260332.
16 May 2010	John Adams	Beethoven	Scherzo (5th movement) from Quartet in C♯ minor, Op. 131	New Budapest String Quartet Label: Hyperion CDA66405.
16 May 2010	John Adams	Schubert	2nd movement from Piano Sonata in B♭ major (D960)	Richard Goode (piano) Label: NONESUCH 7559791242.
16 May 2010	John Adams	Wagner	"Hier sitz' ich zur Wacht" (Götterdämmerung, act 1)	Karl Ridderbusch, Berlin Philharmonic/Herbert von Karajan
16 May 2010	John Adams	James Rhodes	Jeux (excerpt)	Cleveland Orchestra/Pierre Boulez Label: M2YK45620.
16 May 2010	John Adams	The Duke Ellington Orchestra	"The Tattooed Bride"	Duke Ellington & His Orchestra Label: MWML4418.
16 May 2010	John Adams	The Beach Boys	"Good Vibrations"	Beach Boys Label: CDP74667382.
23 May 2010	Rachel Cusk	Johan Sebastian Bach	Goldberg Variations (Variation 13)	Glenn Gould (piano), Label: Sony SM3K 87703.
23 May 2010	Rachel Cusk	Ludwig van Beethoven	Piano Sonata No. 32 in C minor, Op. 111 [excerpt from 2nd movement]	Richard Goode, Label: NONESUCH 979 211-2.
23 May 2010	Rachel Cusk	George Frideric Handel	"As with rosy steps the morn" (from Theodora)	Lorraine Hunt Lieberson (mezzo-soprano), Orchestra of the Age of Enlightenment/Harry Bicket, Label: AVIE AV 0030.
23 May 2010	Rachel Cusk	Benjamin Britten	[[Canticle II: Abraham and Isaac], Op. 51	David Daniels (countertenor), Ian Bostridge (tenor), Julius Drake (piano), Label: Virgin 545525-2.
23 May 2010	Rachel Cusk	Leoš Janáček	Jenůfa (act 2, excerpt)	Eva Randová (Kostelnicka), Vienna Philharmonic/Sir Charles Mackerras, Label: Decca 414 483-2.
23 May 2010	Rachel Cusk	Dmitri Shostakovich	Piano Concerto No. 1 (2nd movement, Lento)	Dmitri Alexeev (piano), Philip Jones (trumpet), English Chamber Orchestra/Jerzy Maksymiuk, Label: Classics for Pleasure CD-CFP 4547.
23 May 2010	Rachel Cusk	Igor Stravinsky	Nonne erubescite (from Oedipus rex, act 2)	Patricia Johnson (Jocasta), Sadler's Wells Opera Chorus, Royal Philharmonic Orchestra/Sir Colin Davis, Label: Classics for Pleasure 585011-2.
23 May 2010	Rachel Cusk	Gerald Finzi	Eclogue (extract)	Piers Lane (piano), Royal Liverpool Philharmonic/Vernon Handley, Label: EMI CDEMX 2239.
20 Jun 2010	Cecil Balmond	Chopin	Fantaisie Impromptu No. 4 in C♯ minor, Op. 66	Arthur Rubenstein (piano)
20 Jun 2010	Cecil Balmond	Bach	Menuetto I & II from Cello Suite No. 1 in G major	Pablo Casals (cello). Label: EMI CHS7610272.
20 Jun 2010	Cecil Balmond	Paganini	1st movement from Grand Sonata in A major	John Williams (guitar). Label: SONY CLASSICAL SBK62425.
20 Jun 2010	Cecil Balmond	The Benny Goodman Quartet	"Runnin' Wild"	Benny Goodman Quartet: Benny Goodman (clarinet), Teddy Wilson (piano), Gene Krupa (drums), Lionel Hampton (vibes) Label: Classics 1936-7.
20 Jun 2010	Cecil Balmond	Brahms	1st movement from Clarinet Quintet in B minor, Op. 115 (excerpt)	Karl Leister (clarinet), Amadeus Quartet. Label: DG 4496112.
20 Jun 2010	Cecil Balmond	Beethoven	Adelaide' (from 7 Lieder) Op. 46	Dietrich Fischer-Dieskau (baritone), Jörg Demus (piano). Label: DG 4151892.
20 Jun 2010	Cecil Balmond	Ladysmith Black Mambazo	Unomathemba	Ladysmith Black Mambazo Label: WARNER 9255822.
27 Jun 2010	Sir Thomas Allen	Michael Berkeley	"The Wakeful Poet" (Music from Chaucer) (pub. OUP)	Beaux-Arts Brass Quintet Label: BBQ BBQ 003.
27 Jun 2010	Sir Thomas Allen	Engelbert Humperdinck	Hansel and Gretel Overture	Dresden Staatskapelle Orchestra/Sir Colin Davis Label: PHILIPS 438 013-2.
27 Jun 2010	Sir Thomas Allen	Schubert	Fantasia in F minor, D. 940 (excerpt)	Alfred Brendel and Evelyne Crochet (piano duet) Label: VOX BOX CD3X 3041.
27 Jun 2010	Sir Thomas Allen	Wagner	Die Meistersinger von Nürnberg Prelude to Act III	Bavarian Radio SO/Rafael Kubelik
27 Jun 2010	Sir Thomas Allen	Frank Bridge	The Sea (part three: Moonlight)	RLPO/Charles Groves Label: EMI CDM 566855-2.
27 Jun 2010	Sir Thomas Allen	Claudio Monteverdi	Il Ritorno d'Ulisse (Act 2, scene 12 [final scene])	Arranger: Henze Thomas Allen (Ulysses), Kathleen Kuhlmann (Penelope), Vienna RSO/Jeffrey Tate. Label: ORFEO C528003.
4 Jul 2010	Dame Barbara Stocking	Michael Berkeley	"The Wakeful Poet" (music from Chaucer)	Beaux-Arts Brass Quintet. Label: BBQ BBQ 003.
4 Jul 2010	Dame Barbara Stocking	Bach	"Gratias Agimus Tibi" (from the Mass in B minor)	Bavarian Radio Choir and Symphony Orchestra/Carlo Maria Giulini. Label: SONY S2K 66354.
4 Jul 2010	Dame Barbara Stocking	Mozart	"Voi che sapete" (from The Marriage of Figaro, Act II)	Angelika Kirschlager (Cherubino), Concerto Köln/René Jacobs Label: HARMONIA MUNDI 901818/20.
4 Jul 2010	Dame Barbara Stocking	Women of the Calabash	"Nkosi Sikelel' iAfrika"	Label: ORCHARD 793415182323.
4 Jul 2010	Dame Barbara Stocking	Agustín Lara	Granada (from the 3 Tenors Concert at the 1990 World Cup)	José Carreras (tenor), Orchestras of the Maggio musicale, Florence and the Rome Opera/Zubin Mehta Label: DECCA 430 433-2.
4 Jul 2010	Dame Barbara Stocking	Alexander Borodin	String Quartet No. 2 in D major (3rd movement, Notturno)	The Lindsays, Label: ASV CDDCA 1143.
4 Jul 2010	Dame Barbara Stocking	Mozart	Piano Concerto No. 27 in B♭ (2nd movement, Larghetto)	Daniel Barenboim (piano and director), Berlin PO Label: TELDEC 75716.
4 Jul 2010	Dame Barbara Stocking	Juan Luis Guerra	"A pedir su mano"	Juan Luis Guerra and 440 Label: KAREN RECORDS 261927.
11 Jul 2010	Scott Turow	Bach	Brandenburg Concerto No. 5 in D (1st movement)	Jean-Pierre Rampal (flute), Henryk Szeryng (violin), George Malcolm (harpsichord), ASMF/Neville Marriner. Label: PHILIPS 470 934-2.
11 Jul 2010	Scott Turow	George Gershwin	"Bess, You Is My Woman Now" (from Porgy and Bess, Act II, scene 1)	Willard White (Porgy), Cynthia Haymon (Bess), LPO/Simon Rattle Label: EMI 749568-2.
11 Jul 2010	Scott Turow	Pink Martini – Music and lyrics by China Forbes	"Hey Eugene"	Pink Martini Label: WRASSE WRASS193.
11 Jul 2010	Scott Turow	Puccini	"Un bel di vedremo" (from Madama Butterfly, Act II)	Renata Tebaldi (Madama Butterfly), Orchestra dell'Accademia di Santa Cecilia, Roma/Tullio Serafin Label: DECCA 470 577-2.
11 Jul 2010	Scott Turow	Traditional music	"The Big Rock Candy Mountains"	Arranger: Roger McGuinn Roger McGuinn Label: Folkden podcast.
11 Jul 2010	Scott Turow	The Byrds – Words from The Book of Ecclesiastes – music Pete Seeger	"Turn! Turn! Turn! (To Everything There is a Season)"	The Byrds Label: CBS 656544-2.
11 Jul 2010	Scott Turow	Stravinsky	The Rite of Spring (Introduction, the Augurs of Spring and Dance of the Adolescents)	LSO/Claudio Abbado Label: DG 453 085-2.
11 Jul 2010	Scott Turow	Stephen Sondheim	"Send In the Clowns" (from A Little Night Music, Act II)	Glynis Johns (Desirée), original cast recording, conducted by Harold Hastings Label: COLUMBIA CK32265.
11 Jul 2010	Scott Turow	Puccini	"O mio babbino caro" (from Gianni Schicchi)	Maria Callas(Lauretta), Philharmonia Orchestra/Tullio Serafin. Label: EMI 566463-2.
25 Jul 2010	William Orbit	William Orbit	Aquarium	William Orbit Label: Universal 4782546.
25 Jul 2010	William Orbit	Stravinsky	1st movement from Symphony in Three Movements	London Symphony Orchestra/Sir Eugene Goossens. Label: PHILIPS 4223032.
25 Jul 2010	William Orbit	Nicola Porpora	Alto Giove from Polifemo Act III	Les Talens Lyriques/Christophe Rousset (Dir & Harpsichord) Label: TRAVELLING K1005.
25 Jul 2010	William Orbit	Vincenzo Bellini	"Ah! non credea mirarti" from La sonnambula, Act II	Maria Callas Orchestra of the Teatro alla Scala, Milan/Antonino Votto Label: EMI CDC5564112.
25 Jul 2010	William Orbit	Mozart	2nd movement from Clarinet Quintet in A major K581	David Shifrin (clarinet), Emerson String Quartet, Label: DG 4596412.
25 Jul 2010	William Orbit	Imogen Heap	"Hide and Seek"	Imogen Heap Label: MEGACD001.
25 Jul 2010	William Orbit	Jean Mouton	"Nesciens Mater"	The Sixteen/Harry Christophers Label: HYPERION CDA66263.
25 Jul 2010	William Orbit	Britten	End sequence from Night Mail	The Nash Ensemble/Lionel Friend, with Nigel Hawthorne (narrator). Label: HYPERION CDA66845.
1 Aug 2010	Russell Kane	Beethoven	Third movement from Piano Sonata No. 14, Op. 27/2	Mikhail Pletnev (piano) Label: EMI VM5618342.
1 Aug 2010	Russell Kane	Béla Bartók	Part One from Rhapsody for Violin & Piano	György Pauk (violin), Jenó Jandó (piano)
1 Aug 2010	Russell Kane	Chopin	Nocturne No. 2 in E♭ Op. 9, No. 2	Daniel Barenboim (piano)
1 Aug 2010	Russell Kane	James Rhodes	"Clair de Lune" from Suite Bergamasque	Moura Lympany (piano) Label: EMI CDZ7625232.
1 Aug 2010	Russell Kane	Alexander Scriabin	1st movement from Piano Sonata No. 3, Op. 23	John Ogdon (piano) Label: EMICZS5726522.
1 Aug 2010	Russell Kane	Schubert	Quartettsatz in C minor D703	Amadeus Quartet Label: DG4100242.
8 Aug 2010	Tracy Chevalier	Michael Berkeley	"The Wakeful Poet" (Music from Chaucer)	Beaux-Arts Brass Quintet Label: BBQ BBQ 003.
8 Aug 2010	Tracy Chevalier	Schubert	Symphony No. 8 in B minor (Unfinished), (excerpt from 1st movement, Allegro moderato)	Vienna PO/Sir Georg Solti Label: DECCA 430 439-2.
8 Aug 2010	Tracy Chevalier	Brahms	Clarinet Sonata No. 2 in E♭, Op. 120 (2nd movement, Allegro appassionato)	Thea King, clarinet; Clifford Benson, piano Label: HYPERION CDS 44340.
8 Aug 2010	Tracy Chevalier	Antonín Dvořák	Symphony No. 9 in E minor (from the New World), (4th movement, Allegro con fuoco)	London Symphony Orchestra/Sir Colin Davis Label: LSO 0001.
8 Aug 2010	Tracy Chevalier	Leonard Bernstein	Prologue	Original Broadway Cast Recording/Max Goberman (Musical Director) Label: SONY SK 60724.
8 Aug 2010	Tracy Chevalier	Schubert	Impromptu in G♭ major, D899	Paul Berkowitz, piano Label: MERIDIAN CDE 84102.
8 Aug 2010	Tracy Chevalier	Anonymous work	"Polorum regina" (from the Llibre Vermell de Montserrat, the Red Book of Montserrat)	The Osnabrückner Youth Choir/Johannes Rahe Label: JARO 41712.
8 Aug 2010	Tracy Chevalier	Robert Schumann	"Of Strange Lands and People" (from Kinderszenen, Op. 15, No. 1)	Alfred Brendel, piano. Label: PHILIPS 434 732-2.
8 Aug 2010	Tracy Chevalier	Talking Heads	"Once in a Lifetime"	Label: SIRE K256867.
15 Aug 2010	Martin Jarvis	Stravinsky	Final section "Tableaux II" from The Firebird	Columbia Symphony Orchestra, Stravinsky Label: CBS CD42432.
15 Aug 2010	Martin Jarvis	Schubert	"Die Forelle"	Janet Baker (mezzo-soprano), Geoffrey Parsons (piano) Label: EMI 7243 5693892.
15 Aug 2010	Martin Jarvis	Schubert	4th movement from the Trout Quintet	András Schiff (piano), Members of the Hagen Quartet with Alois Posch (double bass) Label: DECCA 458608-2.
15 Aug 2010	Martin Jarvis	Bizet	"The Toreador Song" from Carmen Act II	Michel Dens, Choir and Orchestra of the Théâtre National de L'Opéra-Comique Label: EMI CMS5653182.
15 Aug 2010	Martin Jarvis	Mozart	2nd movement from Piano Concerto No. 27 in B♭ major K595	Clifford Curzon (piano), English Chamber Orchestra/Benjamin Britten Label: DECCA 4172882.
15 Aug 2010	Martin Jarvis	Ambrose and his Orchestra	"Painting the Clouds with Sunshine"	Ambrose & His Orchestra Label: HISICD 78120.
15 Aug 2010	Martin Jarvis	Beethoven	4th movement from Symphony No. 7 in A, Op. 92	Philharmonia Orchestra, Otto Klemperer Label: EMI CDM7638682.
15 Aug 2010	Martin Jarvis	Robert Schumann	Widmung (Dedication) from Myrthen Op. 25, No. 1	Lucy Parham, piano Label: SANCTUARY CDRSB202.
22 Aug 2010	David Hyde Pierce	Arthur Sullivan	Overture to H.M.S. Pinafore	Orchestra of Welsh National Opera/Sir Charles Mackerras Label: TELARC CD80374.
22 Aug 2010	David Hyde Pierce	Bach	English Suite No. 3 in G minor (Gigue)	Rosalyn Tureck (piano) Label: ALBANY TROY 009.
22 Aug 2010	David Hyde Pierce	Sir Hubert Parry	Anthem "I was glad"	Iain Simcock (organ), Choir of Westminster Abbey/Martin Neary Label: IMP PCD919.
22 Aug 2010	David Hyde Pierce	Felix Mendelssohn	Piano Concerto No. 1 in G minor, Op. 25 (2nd movement, Andante)	Stephen Hough (piano), CBSO/Lawrence Foster Label: HYPERION CDA 66969.
22 Aug 2010	David Hyde Pierce	Berlioz	"Je vais le voir...Il me revient fidèle" (from Beatrice and Benedict Act 1)	Susan Gritton (Hero), LSO/Sir Colin Davis Label: LSO LIVE 004.
22 Aug 2010	David Hyde Pierce	Louis Vierne	Carillon de Westminster	Andrew Lucas (organ of St Paul's Cathedral) Label: NAXOS 8550955.
29 Aug 2010	Hisham Matar	Shed Alhezam	Sayid Darweesh	Shed Alhezam Label: SAWT AL-QAHIRA 10.
29 Aug 2010	Hisham Matar	Chopin	Study in C minor, Op. 10, No. 12 (The Revolutionary)	Sviatoslav Richter (piano)
29 Aug 2010	Hisham Matar	unknown	Oghniat Al Wadaa	Fairuz Label: EMI ARABIA 01-CC-100010-2.
29 Aug 2010	Hisham Matar	Jean Sibelius	Violin Concerto in D minor, Op. 47 – 3rd movement, Allegro, ma non tanto	Kyung-wha Chung. Orchestra: London Symphony Orchestra. Conductor: André Previn Jascha Heifetz (violin), Chicago Symphony Orochestra, Walter Hendl Label: RCA RD87019.
29 Aug 2010	Hisham Matar	unknown	Ahwa Kamaran	Ghada Shbeir Label: FORWARD MUSIC 63447930017-2.
29 Aug 2010	Hisham Matar	Ligeti	Tempo de Valse (No 4 from Musica ricercata)	Pierre-Laurent Aimard (piano) Label: SONY SK 62308.
29 Aug 2010	Hisham Matar	unknown	Leley Leley el Layl Mawal (Part 1) (Vocal Power Demis Roussos)	Sabah Fakhri Label: B002IDA78C.
29 Aug 2010	Hisham Matar	Schubert	Nacht und Träume	Dietrich Fischer-Dieskau (baritone), Gerald Moore (piano). Label: EMI 565670-2.
29 Aug 2010	Hisham Matar	Nubia Escalay	Song with Tar (The Water Wheel)	Nubia Escalay Label: NONESUCH 72041.
29 Aug 2010	Hisham Matar	Bob Dylan	"I Shall Be Released"	Jeff Buckley Label: COLUMBIA C2K 89202.
12 Sep 2010	Peter Bazalgette	Schubert	Impromptu No. 3 in G♭ D899	Alfred Brendel (piano) Label: PHILIPS 4425432.
12 Sep 2010	Peter Bazalgette	Britten	"Deo Gracias!" (from A Ceremony of Carols Op. 28)	Choir of King's College, Cambridge/Sir David Willcocks Osian Ellis (harp) Label: EMI CDM5651122.
12 Sep 2010	Peter Bazalgette	Bach	1st movement from Keyboard Concerto No. 1 in D minor BWV 1052	Dinu Lipatti (piano), Concertgebouw Amsterdam/Eduard van Beinum Label: JECKLIN DISCO 541.
12 Sep 2010	Peter Bazalgette	Jack Hylton	"Love Is the Sweetest Thing"	Jack Hylton and his Band feat. Pat O'Malley (vocals) Label: ECM2046.
12 Sep 2010	Peter Bazalgette	Mozart	"A Man in Search of Truth and Beauty" (The Magic Flute, Act I)	Rebecca Evans (soprano – Pamina), Simon Keenlyside (baritone – Papageno), London Philharmonic Orchestra/Sir Charles Mackerras Label: CHANDOS CHAN31212.
12 Sep 2010	Peter Bazalgette	John Lennon and Paul Mccartney	"In My Life"	The Beatles
12 Sep 2010	Peter Bazalgette	Richard Strauss	1st movement from Concerto for Oboe and Small Orchestra in D major AV144	Alex Klein (oboe), Chicago Symphony Orchestra/Daniel Barenboim Label: TELDEC 3984239132.
12 Sep 2010	Peter Bazalgette	Carl Davis	Opening Title Music from Pride and Prejudice	Carl Davis (Melvyn Tan – fortepiano) Label: EMI CDEMC3726.
19 Sep 2010	Jackie Kay	Leoš Janáček	Požehnaný (the Blessed) from Lachian Dances JW VI/17	Slovak Radio Symphony Orchestra/Ondrej Lenárd Label: NAXOS 8550411.
19 Sep 2010	Jackie Kay	Giovanni Battista Pergolesi	"O quam tristis et afflicta" from Stabat Mater	Emma Kirkby (soprano), James Bowman (countertenor), The Academy of Ancient Music/Christopher Hogwood. Label: Oiseau Lyre 4256922.
19 Sep 2010	Jackie Kay	Bach	Prelude from Cello Suite No. 6 in D major BWV 1012	Pablo Casals (cello). Label: EMI CHS7610272.
19 Sep 2010	Jackie Kay	Nina Simone	"Four Women"	Nina Simone. Label: PHILIPS 8228462.
19 Sep 2010	Jackie Kay	Richard Strauss	"September" from Four Last Songs	Jessye Norman (soprano). Gewandhaus Orchester/Kurt Masur Label: PHILIPS 411052-2.
19 Sep 2010	Jackie Kay	Ali Farka Touré	"Heygana"	Ali Farka Toure Label: World Circuit WCD017.
19 Sep 2010	Jackie Kay	Schubert	"Nacht und Traume"	Roland Hayes (tenor), Reginald Boardman (piano) Label: PREISER 93462.
19 Sep 2010	Jackie Kay	Jean Redpath	"Leaving the Land"	Jean Redpath Label: Greentrax CDTRAX039.
19 Sep 2010	Jackie Kay	Cole Porter	"Brush Up Your Shakespeare" from Kiss Me, Kate	Lee Wilkof & Michael Mulheren from the New Broadway Cast Recording Label: DRG1298.
3 Oct 2010	Graham Vick	Guillaume de Machaut	Messe de notre Dame, Kyrie	Ensemble Organum, Marcel Péres (director) Label: HARMONIA MUNDI HMG 901590.
3 Oct 2010	Graham Vick	Monteverdi	"Vorrei baciarti" (from Book 7 of the Madrigals)	Sara Mingardo (alto), Monica Bacelli (mezzo-soprano), Concerto Italiano, Rinaldo Alessandrini Label: NAÏVE OP 30395.
3 Oct 2010	Graham Vick	Chopin	Prelude in C♯ minor, Op. 45	Michelangeli (piano)
3 Oct 2010	Graham Vick	Ravi Shankar	Raga Shudh Sarang [an early afternoon rag]	Ravi Shankar Label: Saregama Records CDNFC150918/9.
3 Oct 2010	Graham Vick	Beethoven	String Quartet in C♯ minor, Op. 131 (Finale, Allegro)	Alban Berg Quartett Label: EMI CDS 7471358.
3 Oct 2010	Graham Vick	Mozart	Die Zauberflöte (Act II, scene 8)	Evelyn Lear (Pamina), Fritz Wunderlich (Tamino), James King and Marrti Talvela (Armed Men), Berlin Philharmonic Orchestra, Karl Böhm Label: DG 449 749-2.
3 Oct 2010	Graham Vick	Leonard Bernstein	"Make Our Garden Grow" (finale of Candide)	Robert Rounseville (Candide), Barbara Cook (Cunegonde), The Company, Original Broadway Cast recording, Samuel Krachmalnick (musical director) Label: SONY SK 48017.
17 Oct 2010	Marina Lewycka	Bach	Brandenburg Concerto No. 1 in F, BWV 1046 (1st movement)	The Academy of St Martin's in the Fields/Neville Marriner Label: DECCA 470 934-2.
17 Oct 2010	Marina Lewycka	Handel	"I know that my Redeemer liveth" (from Messiah, Part III)	Carolyn Samson (soprano), The Sixteen/Harry Christophers Label: CORO 16062.
17 Oct 2010	Marina Lewycka	Jean Sibelius	Violin Concerto in D minor, Op. 47 (1st movement, opening)	David Oistrakh (violin), Moscow Philharmonic Orchestra/Gennady Rozhdestvensky Label: BRILLIANT CLASSICS 09421.
17 Oct 2010	Marina Lewycka	Mozart	Piano Sonata in F, K332 (1st movement, Allegro)	Maria Joao Pires (piano) Label: DG 477 5200.
17 Oct 2010	Marina Lewycka	Berlioz	Symphonie fantastique, Op. 14 (4th movement, March to the Scaffold)	Boston Symphony Orchestra/Charles Munch Label: RCA 82876 67899-2.
17 Oct 2010	Marina Lewycka	Mozart	Dove sono (from Le nozze di Figaro, Act III)	Margaret Price (soprano), English Chamber Orchestra/James Lockhart Label: RCA 82876-65841-2.
17 Oct 2010	Marina Lewycka	Traditional Russian folksong	"Black Raven" (Chyorny Voron)	Stella Zubkova (vocals) Label: A free download from audiopoisk.com.
17 Oct 2010	Marina Lewycka	Dawn Chorus	Farm: Dawn in Summer	Label: BBCCD 861.
24 Oct 2010	Ian McDiarmid	Britten	Piano Concerto (second movement, Waltz)	Sviatoslav Richter (piano), English Chamber Orchestra/Benjamin Britten Label: DECCA 475 6051.
24 Oct 2010	Ian McDiarmid	Britten	"Look. Through the port comes the moon-shine astray" (Billy Budd, Act 2, scene 3, aka ""Bil	Simon Keenlyside (Billy), LSO/Richard Hickox Label: CHANDOS CHAN 9826.
24 Oct 2010	Ian McDiarmid	Schubert	Gretchen am Spinnrade	Janet Baker (mezzo-soprano), Gerald Moore (piano) Label: EMI 208087-2.
24 Oct 2010	Ian McDiarmid	James MacMillan	St John Passion (Part II, vi, Christ's garments divided)	London Symphony Chorus and Orchestra/Sir Colin Davis Label: LSO LIVE LSO0671.
24 Oct 2010	Ian McDiarmid	Shostakovich	Lady Macbeth of Mtsensk (the end of Act One)	Galina Vishnevskaya (Katerina Ismailova), Nicolai Gedda (Sergey), Dimiter Petkov (Boris Ismailov), London Philharmonic Orchestra/Mstislav Rostropovich Label: EMI 567776-2.
24 Oct 2010	Ian McDiarmid	William Wordsworth – by Robert Donat	"On Westminster Bridge"	Label: LP: ARGO RG 192.
24 Oct 2010	Ian McDiarmid	Robert Burns – Read by Tom Fleming	"Ae fond kiss"	Label: LISMOR LCOM 6042.
24 Oct 2010	Ian McDiarmid	Traditional music	"Ae fond kiss"	Arranger: Knight/Burns Kenneth McKellar (tenor), Patricia Cahill (soprano) Label: DECCA 466 415-2.
24 Oct 2010	Ian McDiarmid	Leonard Bernstein	"On The Town" (Dance: The Real Coney Island and the Finale)	Ensemble, Chorus and Orchestra/Leonard Bernstein Label: SONY SM3K 47154.
31 Oct 2010	Baroness Shirley Williams	Aaron Copland	Music from Appalachian Spring	New York Philharmonic/Leonard Bernstein Label: Sony Classical SMK63082.
31 Oct 2010	Baroness Shirley Williams	Britten	"Storm at Sea" from Peter Grimes (Act 1)	Orchestra: of the Royal Opera House/Britten Label: DECCA 467 682-2.
31 Oct 2010	Baroness Shirley Williams	Henry Purcell	"The Plaint" from The Fairy Queen	Jennifer Vyvyan (Nymph), Peter Graeme (oboe), Kenneth Heath (cello continuo), Philip Ledger (harpsichord continuo), (English Chamber Orchestra/Benjamin Britten) Label: DECCA 4331632.
31 Oct 2010	Baroness Shirley Williams	Schubert	Music from 1st movement from The Trout Quintet D667	Emil Gilels (piano) Norbert Brainin (violin), Peter Schidlof (viola), Martin Lovett (cello), Rainer Zepperitz (double bass) Label: DG 4134532.
31 Oct 2010	Baroness Shirley Williams	Simon & Garfunkel	"Bridge over Troubled Water"	Simon & Garfunkel Label: CBS CD63699.
31 Oct 2010	Baroness Shirley Williams	Traditional music	"The Keel Row"	Kathleen Ferrier (contralto), Phyllis Spurr (piano). Label: DECCA 4171922.
31 Oct 2010	Baroness Shirley Williams	Handel	"How Beautiful Are the Feet" (from Messiah)	Emma Kirkby (soprano), The Academy of Ancient Music/Christopher Hogwood Label: Oiseau Lyre 4118582.
7 Nov 2010	Arabella Weir	Mozart	Il mio tesoro (from Don Giovanni, Act II) [Joseph Losey film sound track]	Kenneth Riegel (Don Ottavio), Paris Opera Orchestra/Lorin Maazel
7 Nov 2010	Arabella Weir	Schubert	Piano Sonata in B♭, D 960 (Scherzo, Allegro vivace con delicatezza)	Alfred Brendel (piano)
7 Nov 2010	Arabella Weir	Traditional music	"The Wraggle Taggle Gipsies"	Alfred Deller (counter tenor), Desmond Dupré (guitar)
7 Nov 2010	Arabella Weir	Beethoven	Piano Trio in D, Op. 70, No. 1 (The Ghost) (1st movement, Allegro vivace e con brio)	The Beaux Arts Trio
7 Nov 2010	Arabella Weir	Ayah Marar	"Blow the wind southerly"	Kathleen Ferrier
7 Nov 2010	Arabella Weir	Mozart	Piano Sonata in A minor KV 310	Claudio Arrau (piano)
7 Nov 2010	Arabella Weir	Traditional music	"The Skye Boat Song"	The Alexander Brothers
7 Nov 2010	Arabella Weir	Verdi	"Sempre libera" (La Traviata, Act I)	Montserrat Caballé (Violetta), Carlo Bergonza (Alfredo), RCA Italiana Opera Orchestra/Georges Pretre
14 Nov 2010	Zdenka Fantlova	Antonín Dvořák	Symphony No. 9 in E minor (from the New World) (1st movement)	Czech Philharmonic Orchestra/Karel Ancerl
14 Nov 2010	Zdenka Fantlova	Chopin	Study in C minor, Op. 25, No. 12	Vladimir Ashkenazy (piano)
14 Nov 2010	Zdenka Fantlova	Gideon Klein	String Trio (1944) (2nd movement, Adagio)	Daniel Hope (violin), Philip Dukes (viola) and Paul Watkins (cello)
14 Nov 2010	Zdenka Fantlova	Nacio Herb Brown	"You Are My Lucky Star"	Gene Kelly and Debbie Reynolds
14 Nov 2010	Zdenka Fantlova	Bedřich Smetana	The Bartered Bride: Overture	Czech Philharmonic Orchestra/Zdenek Kosler
14 Nov 2010	Zdenka Fantlova	Johann Strauss II	Radetzky March	Vienna Philharmonic Orchestra /Nikolaus Harnoncourt
14 Nov 2010	Zdenka Fantlova	Mozart	Symphony No. 40 in G minor (first movement, Molto allegro)	New York Philharmonic Orchestra/Bruno Walter
5 Dec 2010	Adam Foulds	Nicholas Ludford	Gloria from the Missa Videte Miraculum	The Cardinall's Musick/Andrew Carwood Label: ASV CD GAU 131.
5 Dec 2010	Adam Foulds	Arnold Schoenberg	Tanzszene (5th movement from the Serenade, Op. 24)	London Sinfonietta/David Atherton Label: DECCA 425 626-2.
5 Dec 2010	Adam Foulds	Adam Foulds	reads from his poem "The Broken Word" (Jonathan Cape)	Adam Foulds
5 Dec 2010	Adam Foulds	James Rhodes	Sonata for flute, viola and harp (1st movement, Pastorale)	Roger Bourdin (flute), Colette Lequien (viola), Annie Challan (harp) Label: PHILIPS 422 839-2.
5 Dec 2010	Adam Foulds	Ligeti	Der Sommer	Christiane Oelze (soprano), Irina Kataeva (piano) Label: SONY SK 62311 T1103 07.
5 Dec 2010	Adam Foulds	Stravinsky	"Full Fadom Five" (from 3 Shakespeare Songs)	Emma Kirkby (soprano), Basel Chamber Orchestra/Christopher Hogwood Label: ARTE NOVA 74321 92650-2.
5 Dec 2010	Adam Foulds	Oliver Knussen	Two Organa	London Sinfonietta/Oliver Knussen Label: DG 449 572-2.
5 Dec 2010	Adam Foulds	Leoš Janáček	The vixen dreams she is a young girl (Pantomime 2 from The Cunning Little Vixen, Act I)	Vienna Philharmonic Orchestra/Charles Mackerras Label: DECCA 417 129-2.
5 Dec 2010	Adam Foulds	Neutral Milk Hotel	"Ghost" (from the album In The Aeroplane Over The Sea)	Label: DOMINO REWIGCD 21.
12 Dec 2010	Julian Rhind-Tutt	Georg Philipp Telemann	Concerto in D for trumpets, strings and continuo (I. Adagio)	Håkan Hardenberger (trumpet) Label: PHILIPS 420 954-2.
12 Dec 2010	Julian Rhind-Tutt	Bach	Prelude from the Suite No. 6 in D for unaccompanied cello, BWV 1012	Paul Tortelier (cello) Label: His Master's Voice D 572749-2.
12 Dec 2010	Julian Rhind-Tutt	Tchaikovsky	Violin Concerto in D, Op. 35 (II. Canzonetta: Andante)	Anne-Sophie Mutter (violin), Vienna Philharmonic Orchestra/Andre Previn Label: DG 474 874-2.
12 Dec 2010	Julian Rhind-Tutt	John Hilton	"Lord, for Thy Tender Mercy's Sake"	Clare College Chapel Choir/Timothy Brown Label: GUILD GMCD 7115.
12 Dec 2010	Julian Rhind-Tutt	Puccini	"Che gelida manina" (Your tiny hand is frozen) (from La Bohème, Act 1)	Luciano Pavarotti (Rodolfo), Orchestra of the Royal Opera House, Covent Garden/Edward Downes Label: DECCA 470 011-2.
12 Dec 2010	Julian Rhind-Tutt	Bach	Minuets I and II from the French Suite No. 2 in C minor, BWV 813	Andras Schiff (piano) Label: DECCA CD1.
12 Dec 2010	Julian Rhind-Tutt	Mahler	"Ablösung im Sommer" (from Songs of Youth)	Christian Gerhaher (baritone), Gerold Huber (piano) Label: RCA 88697 56773-2.
12 Dec 2010	Julian Rhind-Tutt	Alan Hawkshaw	"Best Endeavours" (the Theme to Channel 4 News)	Unknown Label: BRUTON BRCD15.
12 Dec 2010	Julian Rhind-Tutt	Bach	Wachet auf, ruft uns die Stimme, BWV 645	David Goode (organ) Label: HERALD HAVPCD 219.
12 Dec 2010	Julian Rhind-Tutt	Sergei Prokofiev	The Fight and The Prince gives his order (from Romeo & Juliet, Act 1, scene 1)	London Symphony Orchestra/Andre Previn Label: PHILIPS 464 726-2.
26 Dec 2010	Pamela Stephenson Connolly	Vincenzo Bellini	"Ah! Non credea mirarti" (from La somnambula, Act II, scene 2)	Joan Sutherland (Amina), Fernando Corena (Rodolfo), Orchestra of the Maggio Musicale Fiorentino/Richard Bonynge Label: DECCA 467 789-2.
26 Dec 2010	Pamela Stephenson Connolly	Orchestre national du Capitole de Toulouse	Gymnopédie No. 1	Anne Queffélec (piano) Label: VIRGIN 522020-2.
26 Dec 2010	Pamela Stephenson Connolly	Kurt Weill	"Alabama Song" (from Mahagonny, words by Brecht)	Lotte Lenya (vocal), orchestra conducted by Roger Bean Label: SONY MHK 63222.
26 Dec 2010	Pamela Stephenson Connolly	James Rhodes	Prélude à l'après midi d'un faune	LSO/André Previn [Peter Lloyd, solo flute]
26 Dec 2010	Pamela Stephenson Connolly	Balinese Gamelan	Lagu Kotok (Frog Song)	Label: NONESUCH EXPLORER SERIES 79794-2.
26 Dec 2010	Pamela Stephenson Connolly	Phil Cunningham	Strathmarches	Blazin' Fiddles Label: BRCD002.
26 Dec 2010	Pamela Stephenson Connolly	Richard Strauss	"Morgen", Op. 27 No. 4	Kiri Te Kanawa (soprano), LSO/Andrew Davis Label: SONY SMK 89881.

== 2011 ==
Date	Guest	Composer	Title	Performer / Label
30 Jan 2011	Tim Waterstone	Elgar	"Where corals lie" from Sea Pictures Op. 37	Janet Baker (mezzo-soprano), The Philharmonia/Sir John Barbirolli Label: PHILIPS 465 253-2.
30 Jan 2011	Tim Waterstone	Elizabeth Poston	Jesus Christ the Apple Tree	The Choir of King's College, Cambridge/Sir David Willcocks Label: EMI VTDCD933.
30 Jan 2011	Tim Waterstone	Puccini	"Doretta's song" from La Rondine, Act 1	William Matteuzzi (Prunier), Angela Gheorghiu (Magda) London Symphony Orchestra/Antonio Pappano (conductor) Label: EMI CDC556339 2.
30 Jan 2011	Tim Waterstone	Mahler	Music from the 4th movement "Adagietto" from Symphony No. 5 in C♯ minor	London Philharmonic Orchestra/Klaus Tennstedt Label: CDC 747105 2.
30 Jan 2011	Tim Waterstone	Gabriel Fauré	"Pie Jesu" from Requiem Op. 48	Richard Eteson (treble), Peter Barley (organ) London Chamber Orchestra/Stephen Cleobury (director) Label: EMI CDC7498802.
30 Jan 2011	Tim Waterstone	Richard Strauss	"Im Abendrot" from Four Last Songs	Renée Fleming (soprano), Houston Symphony Orchestra/Christoph Eschenbach Label: RCA 09026685392.
30 Jan 2011	Tim Waterstone	Jerome Kern	"The Way You Look Tonight"	Fred Astaire. Lyricist: Dorothy Fields Label: CONIFER TQ134.
6 Feb 2011	Richard Mabey	John Dowland	Come Again.	The Consort of Musicke: Evelyn Tubb (soprano), Lucy Ballard (alto), Andrew King (tenor), Simon Grant (bass), Anthony Rooley (lute and director) Label: ASV GAUDEAMUS GAU 187.
6 Feb 2011	Richard Mabey	Eric Bogle	"The Green Fields of France"	The men they couldn't hang Label: DEMON FIEND CD940.
6 Feb 2011	Richard Mabey	Anonymous work	"Les Ameriquains"	Le Concert des Nations/Jordi Savall Label: ALIA VOX AV 9824.
6 Feb 2011	Richard Mabey	I Muvrini	"Barbara furtuna"	Label: CDR 213.
6 Feb 2011	Richard Mabey	Juan de Araujo	Ay, Andar!	Ex Cathedra/Jeffrey Skidmore Label: Moon, sun and all things.
6 Feb 2011	Richard Mabey	David Rothenberg and John Wieczorek and Robert Jürjendal	Soo-roo – Improvisation over the song of marsh warblers	David Rothenberg (clarinet), John Wieczorek (percussion), Robert Jürjendal (guitar). Label: TERRA NOVA MUSIC 0692 8630561-2.
6 Feb 2011	Richard Mabey	Joseph Canteloube	"Lo Calhé" (The Quail) (from Songs of the Auvergne)	Netania Devrath (soprano), Orchestra conducted by Pierre de la Roche Label: VANGUARD 08800272.
6 Feb 2011	Richard Mabey	George Butterworth	"Is my team ploughing?"	Roderick Williams (baritone), Iain Burnside (piano) Label: NAXOS 8.572426.
6 Feb 2011	Richard Mabey	Evencio Castellanos	Santa Cruz de Pacairigua (excerpt)	Simon Bolivar Youth Orchestra of Venezuela/Gustavo Dudamel Label: DG 477 8337.
13 Feb 2011	Joanna van Kampen	Mozart	Excerpts from Requiem K626	Academy of St Martin in the Fields & Chorus/Sir Neville Marriner Label: METRONOME 8251262.
13 Feb 2011	Joanna van Kampen	Gustave Charpentier	Depuis le jour' from Louise (Act III)	Maria Callas (soprano), Orchestra della RAI/Alfredo Simonetto (recorded in 1954, Casino, San Remo) Label: EMI CZS5720302.
13 Feb 2011	Joanna van Kampen	John Williams	"Hedwig's Theme"	City of Prague Philharmonic Orchestra. Conductor: Nic Raine Conductor: John Williams (Randy Kerber – Celeste) Label: ATLANTIC 7567930865.
13 Feb 2011	Joanna van Kampen	Gounod	"Ave Maria"	Yo Yo Ma/Bobby McFerrin Label: SONY SK48177.
13 Feb 2011	Joanna van Kampen	Henry Purcell	"When I Am Laid in Earth" from Dido & Aeneas	Dame Janet Baker (mezzo-soprano), English Chamber Orchestra/Anthony Lewis Thurston Dart (harpsichord continuo) Label: Philips 4652532.
13 Feb 2011	Joanna van Kampen	Bernard Herrmann	The Prelude from the soundtrack to Psycho	National Philharmonic Orchestra/Bernard Herrmann Label: UNICORN UKCD2021.
13 Feb 2011	Joanna van Kampen	Stevie Wonder	"If It's Magic"	Stevie Wonder Label: MOTOWN 157357-2.
20 Feb 2011	John Sergeant	Mahler	Symphony No. 4 in G (2nd movement excerpt)	Vienna Philharmonic Orchestra/Lorin Maazel Label: CBS CD 39072.
20 Feb 2011	John Sergeant	Kurt Weill	"Alabama Song" (from The Rise and Fall of the City of Mahagonny)	Lotte Lenya (vocal), with The Three Admirals and unnamed orchestra Label: NAXOS 8120831.
20 Feb 2011	John Sergeant	Harry Warren	42nd Street	Ruby Keeler and chorus Label: LP UAG 29644.
20 Feb 2011	John Sergeant	Béla Bartók	String Quartet No. 6 (1939) (II. Mesto – Marcia)	Takács Quartet
20 Feb 2011	John Sergeant	Sergei Prokofiev	War and Peace (1943) the final patriotic chorus	Nikolay Okhotnikov (Kutuzov), Chorus and Orchestra of the Kirov Opera/Valery Gergiev Label: PHILIPS 434 097-2.
20 Feb 2011	John Sergeant	Shostakovich	String Quartet No. 8 (1960) (IV. Largo)	Fitzwilliam String Quartet Label: DECCA 421 475-2.
20 Feb 2011	John Sergeant	John Adams	"News has a kind of mystery" (from Nixon in China, Act I, scene 1)	James Maddalena (President Nixon), Sanford Sylvan (Chou En-lai), Thomas Hammons (Henry Kissinger), Orchestra of St Luke's/Edo de Waart Label: ELEKTRA NONESUCH 979 177-2.
27 Feb 2011	Douglas Gordon	Puccini	Vogliatemi bene, un bene piccolino"" (Madama Butterfly love duet, end of Act I)	Maria Callas (Butterfly), Nicolia Gedda (Pinkerton), Orchestra of La Scala, Milan/Herbert von Karajan Label: EMI 556298-2.
27 Feb 2011	Douglas Gordon	Mozart	Sinfonia Concertante in E falt, K364 (cadenza to the 1st movement)	Roi Shiloah (violin), Avri Levitan (viola) Label: Private recording, used with permission.
27 Feb 2011	Douglas Gordon	Joy Division	"Love will tear us apart"	The Oysterband Label: WESTPARK MUSIC 87105.
27 Feb 2011	Douglas Gordon	Bach	"Mein Freund ist mein" (from Cantata 140, Wachet auf, ruft uns die Stimme)	Edith Mathis (sop), Dietrich Fischer-Dieskau (bar), Munich Bach Orchestra/Karl Richter Label: DG 419 466-2.
27 Feb 2011	Douglas Gordon	Mogwai	"Black Spider"	Mogwai Label: WALL OF SOUND LC07800.
27 Feb 2011	Douglas Gordon	Cornelius Cardew	"The Croppy Boy"	Cornelius Cardew (piano) Label: B & L BLCD011.
27 Feb 2011	Douglas Gordon	Schubert	Erlkönig	Dietrich Fischer-Dieskau (baritone), Gerald Moore (piano) Label: EMI 456367-2.
6 Mar 2011	Amanda Vickery	Bach	Gigue (from the Cello Suite No. 3 in C, BWV 1009)	Anne Gastinel (cello) Label: NAÏVE 5121.
6 Mar 2011	Amanda Vickery	Mozart	Bei Männern welche Liebe fühlen (from Die Zauberflöte, Act 1)	Ruth Ziesack (Pamina), Michael Kraus (Papageno), Vienna PO/Sir Georg Solti Label: DECCA 433 210-2.
6 Mar 2011	Amanda Vickery	Britten	"O waly, waly"	David Daniels (counter tenor), Julius Drake (piano) Label: VIRGIN 545525-2.
6 Mar 2011	Amanda Vickery	Handel	La Réjouissance (from Music for the Royal Fireworks)	English Baroque Soloists/John Eliot Gardiner Label: PHILIPS 464706-2.
6 Mar 2011	Amanda Vickery	Thomas Arne	"The soldier tir'd of war's alarms" (from Artaxerxes, Act 3)	Catherine Bott (Mandane), The Parley of Instruments/Roy Goodman Label: HYPERION CDA 67051/2.
6 Mar 2011	Amanda Vickery	Muzio Clementi	Sonata for piano Duet, Op. 6, No. 1 (3rd movement, Presto)	Genevieve Chinn and Allen Brings (piano duet) Label: CENTAUR CRC 2046.
6 Mar 2011	Amanda Vickery	Anonymous work	The Housewife's Lament	Gwyneth Herbert (singer) Label: Private recording used with permission.
6 Mar 2011	Amanda Vickery	Francis Poulenc	Hommage à Edith Piaf (Improvisation No.15)	Gabriel Tacchino (piano) Label: EMI 762551-2.
6 Mar 2011	Amanda Vickery	Charlie Parker's Reboppers	"Blue in Green" (from Kind of Blue)	Mile Davis (trumpet), John Coltrane (tenor sax), Bill Evans (piano), Paul Chambers (bass), Jimmy Cobb (drums) Label: COLUMBIA CK 64935.
6 Mar 2011	Amanda Vickery	Amy Winehouse	"Love is a losing game"	Amy Winehouse Label: ISLAND 1713041.
13 Mar 2011	Al Murray	Handel	Zadok the Priest	Choir of King's College Cambridge/The Academy of Ancient Music Stephen Cleobury Label: CDC5571402.
13 Mar 2011	Al Murray	Nikolai Rimsky-Korsakov	2nd movement from Scheherazade Op. 35 (Symphonic Suite)	Berlin Philharmonic/Herbert Von Karajan Label: DG 4636142.
13 Mar 2011	Al Murray	Philip Glass	Subterraneans' from Low Symphony	The Brooklyn Philharmonic Orchestra/Dennis Russell Davies Label: POINT 4381502.
13 Mar 2011	Al Murray	Carl Orff	"Fortune plango vulnera" from Carmina Burana	St Clement Danes Grammar School Boys' Choir London Symphony Orchestra & Chorus/André Previn Label: EMI CDM5668992.
13 Mar 2011	Al Murray	Elgar	"Nimrod" from The Enigma Variations Op. 36	Vienna Philharmonic/John Eliot Gardiner Label: DG 4632652.
13 Mar 2011	Al Murray	Bach	Chorale from 'Gott is mein König' BWV 71	Thomanerchor Leipzig, Gewandhausorchester Leipzig, Kurt Thomas Label: Classics 0092032BC.
13 Mar 2011	Al Murray	Eric Coates	"The Dam Busters"	BBC Concert Orchestra/Sir Adrian Boult Label: BBC Radio Classics BBCRD9106.
20 Mar 2011	Monty Don	Bach	"Kommt, ihr Töchter, helft mir klagen" (Opening chorus of the St Matthew Passion)	London Oratory Junior Choir, Monteverdi Choir, English Baroque Soloists/John Eliot Gardiner Label: ARCHIV 469 769-2.
20 Mar 2011	Monty Don	Beethoven	Symphony No. 3 in E♭, Eroica (excerpt from 2nd movement Funeral march)	Philharmonia Orchestra/Otto Klemperer Label: EMI 567740-2.
20 Mar 2011	Monty Don	Bach	Brandenburg Concerto No. 1 in F, BWV 1046	The English Concert/Trevor Pinnock Label: ARCHIV 423 492-2.
20 Mar 2011	Monty Don	Henry Purcell	Drum Processional (Music for the Funeral of Queen Mary)	The King's Consort/Robert King Label: Hyperion CDA 66677.
20 Mar 2011	Monty Don	Henry Purcell	"When I am laid in earth" (Dido & Aeneas, Act III)	Anne Sofie von Otter (Dido), The English Concert/Trevor Pinnock Label: ARKIV 427 624-2.
20 Mar 2011	Monty Don	Beethoven	String Quartet in A minor, Op. 132 (3rd movement, Molto Adagio, Heiliger Dankgesang)	Guarneri Quartet
20 Mar 2011	Monty Don	Haydn	Symphony No. 22 in E♭, The Philosopher (1st movement, Adagio)	Austro-Hungarian Haydn Orchestra/Adam Fischer Label: BRILLIANT 99925/6.
20 Mar 2011	Monty Don	Tom Waits	Green Grass	Label: ANTI 66782.
27 Mar 2011	Nicole Krauss	Bach, Beethoven, Bill Evans, Ry Cooder and Jim Dickinson, Joanna Newsom, Mahler, N.A, Nicole Krauss		
3 Apr 2011	Frances Fyfield	Bizet, Britten, John Ireland, John Masefield, Mendelssohn, Mussorgsky, Victor Borge, William Whiting and John Dykes		
10 Apr 2011	Nicky Haslam	Georges Bizet	1st movement from Symphony in C	Academy of St Martin in the Fields/Sir Neville Marriner, Label: EMI CDC5551182.
10 Apr 2011	Nicky Haslam	Alexander Borodin	"And This Is My Beloved" from Kismet	Arranger: Wright/[George Forrest (author)|Forrest]], Alfred Drake, Doretta Morrow, Richard Kiley, Henry Calvin (Original Broadway Cast) Label: Kismet Columbia CK32605.
10 Apr 2011	Nicky Haslam	Leo Tolstoy	Waltz for Piano in F major	Lera Auerbach (piano) Label: BIS CD1502.
10 Apr 2011	Nicky Haslam	Frank Loesser	"Spring Will Be a Little Late This Year"	Deanna Durbin Label: MCA MCLD19183.
10 Apr 2011	Nicky Haslam	Gustave Charpentier	"Depuis le Jour" from Louise, act 3	Maria Callas (soprano), Orchestre National de la Radiodiffusion Française/Georges Prêtre Label: EMI CDM5664662.
10 Apr 2011	Nicky Haslam	Erich Wolfgang Korngold	"Rose Garden" from The Sea Hawk	BBC Philharmonic/Rumon Gamba Label: CHANDOS CHAN10438.
10 Apr 2011	Nicky Haslam	Eddie Condon	"Wherever There's Love"	Lee Wiley/Eddie Condon & His Orchestra Label: HAPPY DAYS 75605522622.
10 Apr 2011	Nicky Haslam	Giacomo Puccini	"Vissi d'arte", from Tosca, act 2	Ljuba Welitsch, Metropolitan Orchestra of New York/Max Rudolf Label: NIMBUS NI7959/60 CD2.
24 Apr 2011	Eric Knowles	Bach	Brandenburg Concerto No. 3 in G], BWV 1048 (1st movement)	Academy of St. Martin in the Fields/Neville Marriner Label: PHILIPS 470 934-2.
24 Apr 2011	Eric Knowles	Alexander Borodin	In the Steppes of Central Asia	Orchestre de la Suisse Romande/Enrest Ansermet Label: DECCA 444 389-2.
24 Apr 2011	Eric Knowles	Nikolai Rimsky-Korsakov	The young prince and princess (from Sheherezade; 3rd movement excerpt)	New York Philharmonic Orchestra /Leonard Bernstein Label: SONY.
24 Apr 2011	Eric Knowles	Sergei Prokofiev	The Wedding (from Lieutenant Kije)	Empire Brass Label: TELARC CD 80220.
24 Apr 2011	Eric Knowles	Beethoven	Symphony No. 6 in F, Op. 68 (1st movement Pleasant feelings upon arrival in the countryside)	New York Philharmonic Orchestra/Leonard Bernstein Label: SONY SMK 47517.
24 Apr 2011	Eric Knowles	Debussy	Arabesque No. 1	Gordon Fergus-Thompson (piano) Label: ASV PLT 8505.
24 Apr 2011	Eric Knowles	Four Tops	"Ask the Lonely"	The Four Tops Label: MOTOWN RECORDS 314530825-2.
1 May 2011	Olivia Williams	Bach	Prelude (from the Cello Suite in G)	Pablo Casals (cello) Label: EMI 566215-2.
1 May 2011	Olivia Williams	Diego Ortiz	Laudate Dominum à 4 alternatim (Psalm 116) (from Ad Vesperas)	Cantar Lontano/Marco Mencoboni Label: EL 062319.
1 May 2011	Olivia Williams	Arvo Pärt	Tabula Rasa	Tasmin Little and Richard Studt (violins), Bournemouth Sinfonietta Label: CFP 575805-2.
1 May 2011	Olivia Williams	Handel	The trumpet shall sound (from Messiah)	David Thomas (bass) The Academy of Ancient Music/Christopher Hogwood Label: OISEAU LYRE 411 858-2.
1 May 2011	Olivia Williams	Felix Mendelssohn	The Overture to Elijah	Edinburgh Festival Chorus, Orchestra of the Age of Enlightenment/Paul Daniel Label: DECCA 455 688-2.
1 May 2011	Olivia Williams	Vivaldi	Mandolin concerto in C (2nd movement, Largo)	Paul O'Dette (mandolin), The Parley of Instruments/Roy Goodman Label: HYPERION CDA 66160.
1 May 2011	Olivia Williams	Mahler	Symphony No. 2 (The Resurrection) [first movement, opening]	New York PO/Leonard Bernstein Label: SONY SX12K 89499.
1 May 2011	Olivia Williams	Brahms	Violin Concerto in D, Op. 77	Fritz Kreisler (violin), LPO/Sir John Barbirolli [recorded 1936] Label: EMI 265042-2.
8 May 2011	Ruth Goodman	Ferdinand Hérold	"A Clog Dance" from La fille mal gardée, act 1	Arranger: John Lanchbery, orchestra of the Royal Opera House, Covent Garden/John Lanchbery Label: DECCA 4308492.
8 May 2011	Ruth Goodman	Henry Purcell	Symphony' from Act 4 of The Fairy Queen	The Symphony of Harmony & Invention (The Sixteen)/Harry Christophers Label: CORO 16005.
8 May 2011	Ruth Goodman	Sergei Prokofiev	"Dance of the Knights" from Romeo & Juliet Act I	London Symphony Orchestra/André Previn Label: EMI CDM5657212.
8 May 2011	Ruth Goodman	Philip Glass	"Knee Play 5" from Einstein on the Beach	The Philip Glass Ensemble/Michael Riesman Label: ELEKTRA NONESUCH 7559793232.
8 May 2011	Ruth Goodman	Handel	The Arrival of the Queen of Sheba from Solomon	The English Concert/Trevor Pinnock Label: ARCHIV 4155182.
8 May 2011	Ruth Goodman	Lúnasa	The Floating Crowbar	Lunasa Label: GREEN LINNET GLCD1200.
8 May 2011	Ruth Goodman	Paganini	Caprice No. 5 in A minor (from 24 Caprices Op. 1)	Itzhak Perlman (violin) Label: EMI CDC7471712.
8 May 2011	Ruth Goodman	Stravinsky	The Princesses' Round' from 'The Firebird	New York Philharmonic/Leonard Bernstein Label: SONY.
15 May 2011	Mike Leigh	Arthur Sullivan	"I was once a Very Abandoned Person" – from Ruddigore, Act II	Singer: Ann Drummond-Grant. Librettist: Gilbert, William Schwenck. Singer: Richard Watson. Orchestra: D'Oyly Carte Opera Orchestra. Conductor: Isidore Godfrey.
15 May 2011	Mike Leigh	Arthur Sullivan	The World is but a Broken Toy"" – from Princess Ida, Act II	Singer: Victoria Sladen. Librettist: Gilbert, William Schwenck. Singer: Thomas Round. Singer: Leonard Osborn. Singer: Jeffrey Skitch. Orchestra: D'Oyly Carte Opera Orchestra. Conductor: Isidore Godfrey.
15 May 2011	Mike Leigh	Charlie Parker's Reboppers	"Blue in Green" (from Kind of Blue)	Miles Davis Quintet (John Coltrane, tenor sax; Bill Evans, piano; Paul Chambers, bass, Jimmy Cobb, drums) Label: COLUMBIA LEGACY CK 64935.
15 May 2011	Mike Leigh	Shostakovich	from Alone – film score	Singer: Irina Kataeva. Orchestra: Frankfurt Radio Symphony Orchestra. Conductor: Mark Fitz-Gerald.
15 May 2011	Mike Leigh	Shostakovich	Overture, Kuzmina Wakes and song Konechen, Konchen, tekhnikum (from film score for Odna)	Irina Mataeva (soprano), Frankfurt RSO, conducted by Marc Fitz-Gerald Label: NAXOS 8570316.
15 May 2011	Mike Leigh	Georges Delerue	"Le Tourbillon de la vie" – from Jules et Jim	Singer: Jeanne Moreau.
15 May 2011	Mike Leigh	Georges Delerue	"Le Tourbillon de la vie" (from Jules et Jim)	Jeanne Moreau Label: WARNER FRANCE 5608 7743-2.
15 May 2011	Mike Leigh	Gilbert & Sullivan	"I once was a very abandoned person" (from Ruddigore, Act II)	Richard Watson (Sir Despard) and Ann Drummond-Grant (Mad Margaret), The Orchestra of D'Oyly Carte, conducted by Isidore Godfrey
15 May 2011	Mike Leigh	Gilbert & Sullivan	"The World is but a broken toy" (from Princess Ida, Act II)	Victoria Sladen (Princess Ida), Thomas Round (Hilarion), Leonard Osborn (Cyril), Jeffrey Skitch (Florian), D'Oyly Carte Opera and Orchestra, conducted by Isidore Godfrey
15 May 2011	Mike Leigh	Jacques Offenbach	"Les oiseaux dans la charmille" – from The Tales of Hoffmann, Act II	Singer: Gianna D'Angelo. Orchestra: Paris Conservatoire Concert Society Orchestra. Conductor: André Cluytens.
15 May 2011	Mike Leigh	Jacques Offenbach	"Les oiseaux dans la chamille" ("The song of the doll", The Tales of Hoffmann, Act II)	Gianna D'Angelo (Olympia), Orchestre de la Societé des Concerts du Conservatoire, conducted by André Cluytens Label: EMI CMS 763222-2.
15 May 2011	Mike Leigh	Kurt Weill	"Ballad of Mack the Knife" – from The Threepenny Opera	Singer: Harald Paulsen. Librettist: Bertolt Brecht.
15 May 2011	Mike Leigh	Kurt Weill and Bertolt Brecht	Moritat von Mack The Knife ("Ballad of Mack the Knife" from Die Dreigroschenoper, The Threepenny Opera	Harald Paulsen (Mack the Knife), unknown orchestra and conductor (1928 recording) Label: CAPRICCIO 10346.
15 May 2011	Mike Leigh	Beethoven	Violin Concerto in D major, Op. 61 – 3rd movement: Rondo	Itzhak Perlman. Orchestra: Philhamonia Orchestra. Conductor: Carlo Maria Giulini.
15 May 2011	Mike Leigh	Beethoven	Violin Concerto in D, Op. 61 (3rd movement: Rondo (Allegro) excerpt)	Itzhak Perlman (violin), Philharmonic Orchestra, conducted by Carlo Maria Giulini Label: EMI CDM 556210-2.
15 May 2011	Mike Leigh	Miles Davis	Blue in Green	Ensemble: Miles Davis Quintet. Composer: Bill Evans.
15 May 2011	Mike Leigh	Mozart	Soave sia il vento"" – from Cosi fan tutte, Act I	Singer: Hillevi Martinpelto. Singer: Alison Hagley. Singer: Thomas S. Allen. Orchestra: Orchestra of the Age of Enlightenment. Conductor: Sir Simon Rattle.
15 May 2011	Mike Leigh	Mozart	Soave sia il vento (from Cosí fan tutte, Act I)	Hillevi Martinpelto (Fiordiligi), Alison Hagley (Dorabella), Thomas Allen (Don Alfonso), Orchestra of the Age of Enlightenment, conducted by Simon Rattle Label: EMI CDS 556170-2.
22 May 2011	Cathy Marston	Shostakovich	Piano Concerto No. 1, Op. 35 (second movement)	Dmitri Alexeev (piano), Philip Jones (trumpet), ECO/Jerzy Maksymiuk
22 May 2011	Cathy Marston	Gabriel Prokofiev	Allegro Gavotte, "Snow Time" (from Concerto for Turntables and Orchestra)	DJ Yoda & The Heritage Orchestra/Jules Buckley
22 May 2011	Cathy Marston	Nina Simone	"Wild Is the Wind"	Nina Simone
22 May 2011	Cathy Marston	Charles Ives	The Unanswered Question	Orpheus Chamber Orchestra
22 May 2011	Cathy Marston	Robert Schumann	"Auf Einer Burg" (from Liederkreis, Op. 39)	Dietrich Fischer-Dieskau (baritone) & Gerald Moore (piano)
22 May 2011	Cathy Marston	Brahms	Piano Concerto No. 1 in D minor, Op. 15 (excerpt from II, Adagio)	Hélène Grimaud (piano), Berlin Staatskapelle Orchestra/Kurt Sanderling
22 May 2011	Cathy Marston	Dave Maric	Unspoken	Katia Labèque Band
22 May 2011	Cathy Marston	Gus MacGregor	Lifeline	Gus MacGregor
29 May 2011	Max Beesley	Mozart	"Dies irae" from Requiem in D minor KV626	Bavarian Radio Chorus and Symphony Orchestra/Leonard Bernstein Label: DG431041-2.
29 May 2011	Max Beesley	Schubert	"Ave Maria"	Elly Ameling (soprano)/Dalton Baldwin (piano) Label: DECCA 4625552.
29 May 2011	Max Beesley	Stravinsky	"The Shrove-Tide Fair" from Petrouchka	Cincinnati Symphony Orchestra/Paavo Järvi Label: TELARC CD80587.
29 May 2011	Max Beesley	Chopin	Prelude Op. 28, No. 4	Terry King (cello), Shizue Sano (piano). Arranger: Copland Label: MUSIC & ARTS PROGRAMS OF AMERICA CD1076.
29 May 2011	Max Beesley	Bach	Prelude in C minor, from The Well-Tempered Clavier, Book 1 BWV 847	Hélène Grimaud (piano) Label: DG 4777978.
29 May 2011	Max Beesley	Max Beesley	Music from The Emperor's Wife soundtrack	Max Beesley (piano), The London Session Orchestra Label: Used by permission.
29 May 2011	Max Beesley	Liszt	Liebestraum No. 3	Yundi Li (piano) Label: DG 471 585-2.
29 May 2011	Max Beesley	Pat Metheny	Third Wind	Pat Metheny Group Label: GEFFEN 92414521.
5 Jun 2011	Sir Trevor McDonald	Elgar	Introduction and Allegro Op. 47 (excerpt)	Hallé Orchestra/Sir John Barbirolli Label: EMI CDM7639552.
5 Jun 2011	Sir Trevor McDonald	Verdi	Prisoners' Chorus from Nabucco Act III	Chorus & Orchestra of La Scala, Milan/Claudio Abbado Label: DG 4194872.
5 Jun 2011	Sir Trevor McDonald	Handel	"I Know That My Redeemer Liveth" from Messiah	Margaret Marshall (soprano), English Baroque Soloists/John Eliot Gardiner, Alastair Ross (organ) Label: PHILIPS 4122672.
5 Jun 2011	Sir Trevor McDonald	Beethoven	1st movement from Violin Concerto in D, Op. 61 (excerpt)	Nigel Kennedy (violin), Sinfonie Orchester des NDR/Klaus Tennstedt (Cadenza by Fritz Kreisler) Label: EMI CDC7545742.
5 Jun 2011	Sir Trevor McDonald	Aaron Copland	"Simple Gifts" from Appalachian Spring	London Symphony Orchestra/Aaron Copland Label: SONY CLASSICAL SMK60133.
5 Jun 2011	Sir Trevor McDonald	Puccini	"Recondita armonia" from Tosca Act I	Giuseppe Campora (Cavaradossi), Orchestra dell'Accademia di Santa Cecilia, Roma/Alberto Erede Label: LONDON 4402362.
5 Jun 2011	Sir Trevor McDonald	Chopin	3rd movement from Piano Concerto No. 1 in E minor, Op. 11	Artur Rubinstein (piano), New Symphony Orchestra of London/Stanislaw Skrowaczewski Label: RCA RD85612.
12 Jun 2011	Amanda Foreman	Thomas Tallis	"If ye love me"	The Tallis Scholars/Peter Phillips Label: GIMELL CDGIMB 450.
12 Jun 2011	Amanda Foreman	John Bull	Galliard (Britannica Musica No. 78)	Pierre Hantaï (harpsichord) Label: ASTREE E8543.
12 Jun 2011	Amanda Foreman	Vivaldi	Amor, hai vinto	Emma Kirkby (soprano), Mark Caudle (cello), Christopher Hogwood (harpsichord) Label: OISEAU LYRE 421 655-2.
12 Jun 2011	Amanda Foreman	Henry Purcell	Drunk as I live, boys... (The Fairy Queen, Act I)	David Thomas (The Drunken Poet), The Monteverdi Choir, The English Baroque Soloists/Sir John Eliot Gardiner Label: ARCHIV 419 221-2.
12 Jun 2011	Amanda Foreman	Handel	The righteous shall be had in everlasting remembrance (Israel in Egypt)	The Monteverdi Choir and Orchestra/Sir John Eliot Gardiner Label: ERATO 4509-99758-2.
12 Jun 2011	Amanda Foreman	John Field	Piano Concerto in A♭ major, Op. 31 (part of the 1st movement)	Míceál O'Rourke (piano), London Mozart Players/Matthias Bamert Label: CHANDOS CHAN 9368.
12 Jun 2011	Amanda Foreman	Henry Bishop	"Lo! Here the Gentle Lark"	Kathleen Battle (soprano), Jean-Pierre Rampal (flute), Margo Garrett (piano) Label: SONY SK 53106 Tr19.
12 Jun 2011	Amanda Foreman	Samuel Coleridge-Taylor	"Deep River"	Virginia Eskin (piano) Label: KOCH 7056
12 Jun 2011	Amanda Foreman	Mozart	Ill Wind	Arranger: Flanders and Swann Label: EMI CDP 7974662.
12 Jun 2011	Amanda Foreman	Ralph Vaughan Williams	Fantasia on a theme by Thomas Tallis (the opening)	RPO/André Previn Label: TELARC CD-80158.
19 Jun 2011	David Bintley	Mahler	Symphony No. 2 (Resurrection) end of the Finale	Lee Venora (soprano) Jennie Tourel (mezzo-soprano), New York PO/Leonard Bernstein Label: SONY CLASSICAL SX12K 89499.
19 Jun 2011	David Bintley	Stravinsky	Dance of the Coachmen and the Grooms (Petrushka)	LSO/Claudio Abbado Label: DG 453 085-2.
19 Jun 2011	David Bintley	Verdi	Otello Act II Finale "Sì, pel ciel marmareo giuro"	Plácido Domingo (Otello), Sergei Leiferkus (Iago), Orchestra of the Opera, Bastille/Myung- Whun Chung Label: DG 439 805-2.
19 Jun 2011	David Bintley	Britten	Prince of the Pagodas Act 2 Coda to the "Water" section	London Sinfonietta/Oliver Knussen Label: VIRGIN CLASSICS0777 7595782-2.
19 Jun 2011	David Bintley	Bob Dylan	"Make you feel my love" (from the album Dylanesque)	Bryan Ferry Label: VIRGIN CDV 3026.
19 Jun 2011	David Bintley	James MacMillan	"Verily I say unto thee, today thou shalt be with me in Paradise" (III from Seven Last Word	Polyphony, The Britten Sinfonia/Stephen Layton Label: HYPERION CDA 67460.
19 Jun 2011	David Bintley	Frank Wess	"Segue in C" (from First Time! The Count Meets the Duke)	Duke Ellington and his orchestra, Count Basie and his orchestra Label: CBS 450509-2.
19 Jun 2011	David Bintley	Matthew Hindson	Westaway (from Violin Concerto No. 1, 'Australian Postcards')	Naoko Miyamoto (violin), New Zealand SO/Kenneth Young Label: TRUST RECORDS TRI3004.
3 Jul 2011	Alex Horn	Mozart	3rd movement "Rondo" from Horn Concerto No. 4 in E♭ major K495	Barry Tuckwell – horn, Academy of St Martin in the Fields/Sir Neville Marriner Label: EMI CDM7695692.
3 Jul 2011	Alex Horn	Sergei Prokofiev	Music from Peter and the Wolf	Ben Kingsley (narrator), London Symphony Orchestra/Sir Charles Mackerras Label: CALA CACD1022.
3 Jul 2011	Alex Horn	Editus	Morning	Label: INTEMPO.
3 Jul 2011	Alex Horn	Victor Hely-Hutchinson	3rd movement from Carol Symphony (excerpt)	Pro Arte Orchestra/Barry Rose Label: EMI CDM7641312.
3 Jul 2011	Alex Horn	John Philip Sousa	"Liberty Bell"	The Regimental Band of the Parachute Regiment/ WOI L Tyler (Bandmaster) Label: BANDLEADER BNA5006.
3 Jul 2011	Alex Horn	Vivaldi	Concerto No. 4 in F minor RV297 "Winter" from The Four Seasons	Viktoria Mullova (violin), Chamber Orchestra of Europe/Claudio Abbado Label: PHILIPS 4202162.
3 Jul 2011	Alex Horn	Cary Swinney	"Birdwatcher"	Label: JOHNSON GRASS RECORDS.
10 Jul 2011	Andrew Graham-Dixon	Wagner	Prelude to Das Rheingold (the opening of The Ring)	Oda Balsborg (Woglinde) Vienna PO/Sir Georg Solti
10 Jul 2011	Andrew Graham-Dixon	Beethoven	String Quartet in A minor, Op. 132 (part of 3rd movement, Molto adagio, Heiliger Dankgesang)	Guarneri Quartet Label: RCA 82876-55704-2.
10 Jul 2011	Andrew Graham-Dixon	Maceo Merriweather	"Chicago Breakdown"	Label: LP RCA PM 42039 LP2.
10 Jul 2011	Andrew Graham-Dixon	Bach	Chaconne (from the Partita No. 2 in D minor for solo violin, BWV 1004)	Nathan Milstein (violin) Label: DG 423 294-2.
10 Jul 2011	Andrew Graham-Dixon	Keith Jarrett	Staircase, part 3	Label: ECM 1090/91.
10 Jul 2011	Andrew Graham-Dixon	Garland & Razaf	"In the Mood"	Arranger: Glenn Miller Glenn Miler and his Orchestra
10 Jul 2011	Andrew Graham-Dixon	Schubert	Impromptu in E♭, D899 No. 2	Wilhelm Kempff (piano) Label: DG 459 412-2.
10 Jul 2011	Andrew Graham-Dixon	Sex Pistols – Paul Cook & Steve Jones	"Anarchy in the UK"	Label: VIRGIN CDVX 2086.
17 Jul 2011	Helen Dunmore	Stephen Foster	"Ah! May the Red Rose Live Always"	Thomas Hampson (baritone), Armen Guzelimian (piano), Kenneth Sillito (violin obbligato) Label: EMI CDC7540512.
17 Jul 2011	Helen Dunmore	Gluck	"What is Life" from Orfeo ed Euridice Act III	Kathleen Ferrier (contralto), London Symphony Orchestra/Sir Malcolm Sargent Label: DECCA 4334702.
17 Jul 2011	Helen Dunmore	Traditional music	Bound for South Australia	Fisherman's Friends Label: Island 2766794.
17 Jul 2011	Helen Dunmore	Country Joe and the Fish	"The "Fish" Cheer/I-Feel-Like-I'm-Fixin'-to-Die Rag"	Label: VANGUARD VMD792662.
17 Jul 2011	Helen Dunmore	Schubert	2nd movement from String Quintet in C major D956 (EXCERPT)	Melos Quartet/Mstislav Rostropovich (cello) Label: DG 4153732.
17 Jul 2011	Helen Dunmore	Gregorian Chant	Salve Regina – Ton Solennel I – Salut, ô Reine from Fêtes de la très Sainte Vierge	Choeur des Moines de Saint-Benoît-du-Lac/ Dom André Saint-Cyr Label: FORLANE 3005102.
17 Jul 2011	Helen Dunmore	Jean Sibelius	"Intermezzo" from Karelia Suite Op. 11	Paavo Berglund/Bournemouth Symphony Orchestra Label: EMI CZS5742002.
17 Jul 2011	Helen Dunmore	Mozart	Confutatis & Lacrimosa from Requiem KV 626	English Baroque Soloists/Monteverdi Choir/ John Eliot Gardiner Label: PHILIPS 4201972.
17 Jul 2011	Helen Dunmore	Vampire Weekend	"Cape Cod Kwassa Kwassa"	Label: XL VAMP1.
24 Jul 2011	Hugh Hudson	Richard Strauss	"Morgen" Op. 27/4	Jessye Norman (soprano), Gewandhausorchester Leipzig/Kurt Masur Label: PHILIPS 4110522.
24 Jul 2011	Hugh Hudson	Bach	"Aria" from Goldberg Variations BWV 988	Glenn Gould (piano) Label: CBS CD44868.
24 Jul 2011	Hugh Hudson	Thelonious Monk	"Straight, No Chaser" (excerpt)	Thelonious Monk Quintet Label: HARMONIA MUNDI 2741365.66.
24 Jul 2011	Hugh Hudson	John Corigliano	"War Lament" from Revolution soundtrack	National Philharmonic Orchestra/Harry Rabinowitz Label: VARESE SARABANDE 3020670002.
24 Jul 2011	Hugh Hudson	Elgar	"Softly and Gently" from The Dream of Gerontius Op. 38	Dame Janet Baker (The Angel), CBSO Chorus, City of Birmingham Symphony Orchestra/Simon Rattle Label: EMI CDS7495492.
24 Jul 2011	Hugh Hudson	Ravel	Lever du Jour from Daphnis and Chloe Suite No. 2	New York Philharmonic/Leonard Bernstein, Schola Cantorium Label: CBS CD42541.
24 Jul 2011	Hugh Hudson	Vangelis	5th movement from Methodea Music for NASA (excerpt)	Jessye Norman/Kathleen Battle, London Metropolitan Orchestra/Blake Neely, The National Opera of Greece Choir Label: SONY CLASSICAL SK89191.
24 Jul 2011	Hugh Hudson	McHugh/Fields	"On the Sunny Side of the Street"	Billie Holiday with The Eddie Heywood Trio Label: COMMODORE 624291.
7 Aug 2011	Simon Hopkinson	Michael Tippett	"Magnificat" from Evening Canticles	The Choir of St John's College, Cambridge/George Guest, Andrew Carwood (organ) Label: NIMBUS NI5335.
7 Aug 2011	Simon Hopkinson	Frederick Delius	"On Hearing the First Cuckoo in Spring"	English Chamber Orchestra/Daniel Barenboim Label: DG 4197482.
7 Aug 2011	Simon Hopkinson	Rahsaan Roland Kirk	"Serenade to a Cuckoo" (Live)	Rahsaan Roland Kirk (flute), Ron Burton (piano), Henry "Pete" Pearson (bass). Robert Shy (drums), Joe Texidor (percussion) Label: ATLANTIC.
7 Aug 2011	Simon Hopkinson	Britten	"For I will consider my cat Jeoffry" + "For the mouse is a creature of great personal valour"	Roger Parker (treble), Michael Pearce (counter-tenor), Brian Runnett (organ)Recording: The Choir of St John's College, Cambridge/George Guest
7 Aug 2011	Simon Hopkinson	Aaron Copland	Fanfare for the Common Man	The London Philharmonic/Carl Davis Label: VIRGIN CLASSICS VC7907162.
7 Aug 2011	Simon Hopkinson	Soft Machine	"Out-Blood-Rageous" (excerpt)	Label: Third COLUMBIA 4714072.
7 Aug 2011	Simon Hopkinson	Messiaen	O sacrum convivium!	The Choir of St John's College, Cambridge/George Guest Label: DECCA 4780353.
7 Aug 2011	Simon Hopkinson	Jehan Alain	"Litanies" from Trois Pieces	Thomas Trotter (organ) Label: ARGO 430 833-2.
11 Sep 2011	Stella Tillyard	Schubert	1st movement from Piano Trio in B♭ Op. 99, D898	Beaux Arts Trio Label: PHILIPS 4126202.
11 Sep 2011	Stella Tillyard	Sherman/Busch	"Hello Muddah, Hello Fadduh"	Allan Sherman Label: RHINO R275771.
11 Sep 2011	Stella Tillyard	Bach	"Gigue" from Cello Suite No. 1 in G major for Cello BWV 1007	Pablo Casals (cello) Label: PEARL GEMS0045.
11 Sep 2011	Stella Tillyard	Kurt Weill	"Alabama Song" from Rise & Fall of the City of Mahagonny	Lotte Lenya with The Three Admirals and Orchestra Label: NAXOS 8120831.
11 Sep 2011	Stella Tillyard	Béla Bartók	1st movement from Violin Concerto No. 2 Sz112	Itzhak Perlman (violin), London Symphony Orchestra/André Previn Label: EMI CDM5660602.
11 Sep 2011	Stella Tillyard	John Hardy	Symphony for Candlemas Eve	Oxford University Orchestra/Hugh MacDonald Label: Used by permission of composer and
11 Sep 2011	Stella Tillyard	Gluck	Che farò senza Euridice' from Orfeo ed Euridice Act III	Dietrich Fischer Dieskau (baritone), Munchener Bach-Orchester/Karl Richter Label: DG 4635002.
11 Sep 2011	Stella Tillyard	Beethoven	Prisoners' Chorus from Fidelio Act 1	Philharmonia Chorus & Orchestra/Otto Klemperer Label: EMI 5673642.
11 Sep 2011	Stella Tillyard	Traditional music	Oi Oi Di Koilen (The Coal Dance)	Mishka Ziganoff (accordion) Label: CD7034 ARHOOLIE RECORDS.
11 Sep 2011	Stella Tillyard	Traditional music	Bella Ciao	Giorgio Gaber Label: DIGITAL PRESSURE/PEER SOUTHERN PROD.
18 Sep 2011	Aminatta Forna	Bach	"Andante" from Italian Concerto in F (BWV 971)	Alfred Brendel (piano) Label: PHILIPS 4544092.
18 Sep 2011	Aminatta Forna	Elgar	1st movement from Cello Concerto in E minor Op. 85	Julian Lloyd Webber (cello), Royal Philharmonic Orchestra/Sir Yehudi Menuhin Label: PHILIPS 4163542.
18 Sep 2011	Aminatta Forna	Louis Armstrong/Jelly Roll Morton	"Wild Man Blues"	Dr Michael White (clarinet), Steve Pistorious (piano) Label: VERVE 5177772.
18 Sep 2011	Aminatta Forna	Sergei Prokofiev	Montagues and Capulets from Romeo and Juliet Ballet Suite Op. 64	Philharmonia Orchestra/Efrem Kurtz Label: EMI CDZ7625302.
18 Sep 2011	Aminatta Forna	Ali Farka Touré	"Sega" (trans The Grass Snake) Peul (of the Fula People)	Ali Farka Toure (njarka), Hamma Sankare (calabash), Oumar Toure (congas) Label: WORLD CIRCUIT WCD040.
18 Sep 2011	Aminatta Forna	Rodrigo Leão	"Ave Mundi"	Rodrigo Leão Label: COLUMBIA 4814532.
18 Sep 2011	Aminatta Forna	Tchaikovsky	3rd movement from Piano Concerto No. 1 in B♭ minor Op. 23	Andras Schiff (piano), Chicago Symphony Orchestra/Sir Georg Solti Label: DECCA 4172942.
25 Sep 2011	Simon Mawer	Hildegard von Bingen	"Colomba Aspexit"	Emma Kirkby (soprano), Gothic Voices, Doreen Muskett (symphony) Label: HYPERION CDA 66039.
25 Sep 2011	Simon Mawer	Mozart	"Kyrie Eleison" [from the Great Mass in C minor, K427]	Sylvia McNair (soprano), Monteverdi Choir, English Baroque Soloists/Sir John Eliot Gardiner; Label: PHILIPS 420 210-2.
25 Sep 2011	Simon Mawer	Leoš Janáček	"A blown-away leaf" (from On the Overgrown Path, book 1)	Leif Ove Andsnes (piano) Label: VIRGIN CLASSICS VC 759639-2.
25 Sep 2011	Simon Mawer	George Antheil	Ballet mécanique	Ivan Davis (piano), Rex Lawson (pianolist), The New Palais Royale Orchestra and Percussion Ensemble/Maurice Peress Label: MUSIC MASTERS 01612-67094-2.
25 Sep 2011	Simon Mawer	Beethoven	Piano Sonata in C minor, Opus 111 [beginning of the 2nd movement]	Daniel Barenboim (piano) Label: DG 423 371-2.
25 Sep 2011	Simon Mawer	Léo Ferré	Paname	Juliette Gréco (singer) with André Popp and his orchestra Label: POLYGRAM DISTRIBUTION 830 955-2.
25 Sep 2011	Simon Mawer	Duke Ellington	"Mood Indigo"	Sidney Bechet and his New Orleans Feetwarmers Label: CLASSICS 860.
25 Sep 2011	Simon Mawer	Vítezslava Kaprálová	Partita for String Orchestra & Piano, Op. 20 (1st movement, Allegro energico)	Jiří Skovajsa (piano), Symphony Orchestra of Brno/Frantisek Jilek Label: STUDIO MATOUS MK0049-2011.
2 Oct 2011	Michael Grandage	Giovanni Pierluigi da Palestrina	Kyrie' from Missa Pape Marcelli	The Tallis Scholars/Peter Phillips (Director) Label: GIMELL CDGIM204.
2 Oct 2011	Michael Grandage	Mozart	3rd movement from Horn Concerto No. 2 in E♭ major K417	Dennis Brain (Horn), Philharmonia Orchestra/Herbert von Karajan Label: EMI CDM5668982.
2 Oct 2011	Michael Grandage	Shostakovich	4th movement from Symphony No. 5 in D minor Op. 47	National Symphony Orchestra/Mstislav Rostropovich Label: DG 4394812.
2 Oct 2011	Michael Grandage	Malcolm Arnold	2nd movement from Concerto for Two Pianos & Orchestra Op. 104	Phyllis Sellick/Cyril Smith (pianos), CBSO/Malcolm Arnold Label: EMI Classics CDM 760442.
2 Oct 2011	Michael Grandage	Frank Loesser	"My Time of Day"/"I've Never Been In Love Before"	Ian Charleson/Julie Covington from the Original National Theatre Cast Recording Label: MUSIC FOR PLEASURE CDMFP5978.
2 Oct 2011	Michael Grandage	Doug Hodge	"Wish I'd Found You First"	Doug Hodge Label: RIGHT BACK RECORDS RBRP002.
2 Oct 2011	Michael Grandage	Daniel Evans	"Come Unto These Yellow Sands" – Incidental Music from The Tempest	Daniel Evans Label: By permission of composer and
2 Oct 2011	Michael Grandage	Britten	Music from Billy Budd Act II sc ii	London Symphony Orchestra/Richard Hickox Label: VIRGIN CLASSICS 5190392.
9 Oct 2011	Margaret Mountford	Charles-Valentin Alkan, Chopin, Liszt, Schubert, Schubert, Verdi, Wagner, Wagner		
16 Oct 2011	Lucinda Lambton	Bach	Brandenburg Concerto No. 6 in B♭ (3rd movement, Allegro)	The Academy of Ancient Music/Christopher Hogwood Label: OISEAU LYRE 414 187-2.
16 Oct 2011	Lucinda Lambton	Julia Ward Howe	"The Battle Hymn of the Republic"	Reinald Werrenrath (baritone), Josef Pasternack (conductor) Label: VICTOR B-19377.
16 Oct 2011	Lucinda Lambton	Mozart	Variations on "Ah, vous dirai-je Maman", K. 265	Clara Haskil (piano) Label: DG 437 676-2.
16 Oct 2011	Lucinda Lambton	Carl Maria von Weber	Overture to Oberon|Berlin PO/Herbert Von Karajan Label: DG 020 102-2.	
16 Oct 2011	Lucinda Lambton	Traditional music	"America the Beautiful"	Ray Charles Label: RHINO 605748.
16 Oct 2011	Lucinda Lambton	Jacques Offenbach	Les oiseaux dans la charmille (The Tales of Hoffmann, Act 1)	Joan Sutherland (Olympia), Jacques Charon (Spalanzani), The Orchestra of the Suisse Romande/Richard Bonynge Label: DECCA 417 363-2.
16 Oct 2011	Lucinda Lambton	Paganini	Violin Concerto No. 1 in D (part of the 3rd movement, Rondo, allegro spiritoso)	Yehudi Menuhin (violin), Paris SO/Pierre Monteux Label: EMI CDH 565959-2.
16 Oct 2011	Lucinda Lambton	Savoy Family Cajun Band	"J'ai passé devant ta porte"	Savoy Family Cajun Band Label: FESTIVALINK R 1691304.
30 Oct 2011	Trevor Phillips	Haydn	1st movement from Trumpet Concerto in E♭ major	Wynton Marsalis (trumpet), National Philharmonic Orchestra/Raymond Leppard Label: CBS CD37846.
30 Oct 2011	Trevor Phillips	Handel	"How silently, how slyly" from Julius Caesar Act I	Dame Janet Baker (Caesar), Orchestra of the English National Opera/Sir Charles Mackerras Label: EMI CDM7637242.
30 Oct 2011	Trevor Phillips	Traditional music	Because He Was a Bonny Lad	The Unthanks Label: EMI 6871222.
30 Oct 2011	Trevor Phillips	Thomas Tallis (excerpt)	Fantasia on a Theme	Academy of St Martin-in-the-Fields/Neville Marriner Iona Brown, Trevor Connah (violins), Stephen Shingles (viola), Kenneth Heath (cello) Label: ARGO 4145952.
30 Oct 2011	Trevor Phillips	Traditional music	"Mawnin' Neighba"	The Cari Singers Label: Guest's private recording.
30 Oct 2011	Trevor Phillips	Tom Lehrer	The Elements	Tom Lehrer Label: RHINO R279831.
6 Nov 2011	Anoushka Shankar	Anoushka Shankar	"Si no peurdo Vela" (excerpt)	Anoushka Shankar Label: Traveller DG4779360.
6 Nov 2011	Anoushka Shankar	Debussy	"Dr Gradus ad Parnassum" from Children's Corner	Philippe Entremont (piano) Label: SONY CLASSICAL SBK48174.
6 Nov 2011	Anoushka Shankar	Ali Farka Touré & Toumani Diabaté	"Monsieur Le Maire de Niafunké"	Ali Farka Touré (guitar), Toumani Diabaté (kora), Olalekan Babalola (percussion) Label: WORLD CIRCUIT WCD072.
6 Nov 2011	Anoushka Shankar	Gabriel Fauré	2nd movement "Andantino" from Trio for Piano, Cello & Violin Op. 120	Gil Shaham (violin), Akira Eguchi (piano), Brinton Smith (cello) Label: VANGUARD ATMCD1239.
6 Nov 2011	Anoushka Shankar	Ravi Shankar	Karnãtaki (Raga Kirvãni)	Ravi Shankar (sitar), Kanai Dutta (tabla), Nodu Mullick (tampura) Label: BGO BGOCD115.
6 Nov 2011	Anoushka Shankar	Erik Satie	Gymnopédie No. 1	Angela Brownridge (piano) Label: EMI CDEMX9507.
6 Nov 2011	Anoushka Shankar	Gino D'Auri	"Recuerdo de la Alhambra"	Gino D'Auri Label: HEARTS OF SPACE 1034585.
6 Nov 2011	Anoushka Shankar	Nick Cave	"Into My Arms"	Nick Cave (vocals, piano), Martyn P Casey (bass) Label: MUTE CDSTUMM142.
13 Nov 2011	Garry Fabian Miller	Pérotin	Beata viscera	The Hilliard Ensemble/Dir Paul Hillier (David James – countertenor) Label: ECM 8377512.
13 Nov 2011	Garry Fabian Miller	William Byrd	"Agnus Dei" from Mass for Four Voices	Choir of King's College, Cambridge/Sir David Willcocks Label: DECCA 4336752.
13 Nov 2011	Garry Fabian Miller	John Dowland	"Flow My Tears"	Alfred Deller (counter tenor), Desmond Dupré (lute) Label: HARMONIA MUNDI HM90215.
13 Nov 2011	Garry Fabian Miller	Traditional music	The Border Widow's Lament	June Tabor, Huw Warren (piano) Label: TOPIC TSCD543.
13 Nov 2011	Garry Fabian Miller	Antony and the Johnsons	"Hope There's Someone"	Antony & The Johnsons Label: ROUGH TRADE RTRADCD223.
13 Nov 2011	Garry Fabian Miller	Traditional music	"The Snow it melts the Soonest"	Anne Briggs Label: TOPIC TSCD7078.
13 Nov 2011	Garry Fabian Miller	Bach	"Sarabande" from English Suite No. 2 in A minor BWV 807	Murray Perahia (piano) Label: SONY CLASSICAL SK60277.
13 Nov 2011	Garry Fabian Miller	Grieg/Emanuel Geibel	"One day, my thought" from Six Songs Op. 48	Anne Sofie Von Otter (mezzo-soprano), Bengt Forsberg (piano) Label: DG4375212.
20 Nov 2011	Joey DeFrancesco	Joey DeFrancesco	Donny's Tune	Joey DeFrancesco (organ), Ramon Banda (drums), Rick Zunigar (guitar) Label: HIGHNOTE HCD7226.
20 Nov 2011	Joey DeFrancesco	Bach	"Prelude" from Prelude and Fugue in D BWV 532	Virgil Fox (organ) Label: MUSIC FOR PLEASURE MFP2096.
20 Nov 2011	Joey DeFrancesco	Jimmy Smith	"Blues for J"	Jimmy Smith (organ), Kenny Burrell (guitar), Grady Tate (drums) Label: VERVE 8256752.
20 Nov 2011	Joey DeFrancesco	Beethoven	4th movement from "Symphony No. 5 in C minor" Op. 67	West-Eastern Divan Orchestra/Daniel Barenboim Label: WARNER 2564627912.
20 Nov 2011	Joey DeFrancesco	Charlie Parker's Reboppers	"My Funny Valentine"	Miles Davis (trumpet), Herbie Hancock (piano), Ron Carter (bass), Tony Williams (drums) Label: SONY BMG 1211.
20 Nov 2011	Joey DeFrancesco	Debussy	"Clair de Lune" from Suite bergamasque	Martin Jones (piano Label: NIMBUS N15160.
20 Nov 2011	Joey DeFrancesco	Chopin	Nocturne No. 2 in E♭ major	Daniel Barenboim (piano) Label: DG 4314862.
20 Nov 2011	Joey DeFrancesco	Ray Charles	"Let the Good Times Roll"	Ray Charles/Count Basie Orchestra feat Joey DeFrancesco (organ) Label: CONCORD 7230026.
4 Dec 2011	Henry Sandon	Thomas Tomkins	"O, that the salvation were given"	Choir of New College, Oxford/Edward Higginbottom, David Burchell (organ) Thomas Carey & Christopher Neale (trebles), Michael Morton & Jeremy Burrows (basses) Label: CRD 3467.
4 Dec 2011	Henry Sandon	Henry Purcell	"Strike the viol" (Come ye sons of art away)	Oriana Concert Orchestra/Alfred Deller (counter tenor) Label: VANGUARD 08 5060.
4 Dec 2011	Henry Sandon	Bach	Brandenburg Concerto No. 3 (1st movement)	The Academy of Ancient Music/Christopher Hogwood Label: OISEAU LYRE 414 187-2.
4 Dec 2011	Henry Sandon	Elgar	Ave verum corpus, Op. 2, No. 1	Worcester Cathedral Choir/Christopher Robinson, Harry Bramma (organ) Label: His Master's Voice CBD 3660.
4 Dec 2011	Henry Sandon	Britten	Nocturne (The splendour falls on castle walls, Tennyson) (from the Serenade for tenor, hor	Peter Pears (tenor), Dennis Brain (horn), Boyd Neel Orchestra/Benjamin Britten Label: DECCA 425 996-2.
4 Dec 2011	Henry Sandon	Lennox Berkeley	"The Lord is my shepherd"	Benjamin Durrant (treble), Choir of St John's College, Cambridge/Christopher Robinson, Jonathan Vaughn (organ) Label: NAXOS 8.557277.
4 Dec 2011	Henry Sandon	Leonard Bernstein	"America" (from West Side Story)	Marilyn Cooper (Rosalia), Chita Rivera (Anita), Original Broadway cast recording, Max Goberman (musical director) Label: COLUMBIA CK 32603.
4 Dec 2011	Henry Sandon	Noël Coward	Nina (aka Senorita Nina, or Nina from Argentina)	Noel Coward (vocals), Piccadilly Theatre Orchestra/Mantovani Label: EMI CDP 7971572.
11 Dec 2011	Dan Stevens	Mozart	Requiem in D minor, K. 626: Lacrimosa	The Hanover Band & Chorus/Roy Goodman Label: NIMBUS NI 5241.
11 Dec 2011	Dan Stevens	Traditional Congolese	Sanctus (from the Missa Luba)	Les troubadours de roi Baudouin Label: EL ACMEM136CD.
11 Dec 2011	Dan Stevens	William Byrd	Kyrie (from the Mass for 4 voices)	Oxford Camerata/Jeremy Summerly Label: NAXOS 8550574.
11 Dec 2011	Dan Stevens	Gabriel Fauré	In Paradisum (from the Requiem)	Maitrise de Paris & Accentus, Orchestre National de France/Laurence Equilbey Label: NAIVE 5137.
11 Dec 2011	Dan Stevens	Philip Glass	Koyaanisqatsi (from the film Koyaanisqatsi)	Albert De Ruiter (the voice of Koyaanisqatsi), orchestra conducted by Michael Reisman Label: ISLAND IMCD98.
11 Dec 2011	Dan Stevens	Peter Bellamy	"Courting Too Slow" (from the album Bellow)	John Spiers & Jon Boden Label: FELLSIDE RECORDINGS FECD175.
11 Dec 2011	Dan Stevens	Gregorio Allegri	Miserere	The Tallis Scholars/Peter Phillips Label: GIMELL CDGIM 339.
11 Dec 2011	Dan Stevens	Bach	"Largo ma non tanto" (from the Concerto for 2 Violins in D minor, BWV 1043)	Daniel Hope and Marieke Blankestijn (violins), Chamber Orchestra of Europe Label: WARNER 2564 62545-2.
11 Dec 2011	Dan Stevens	Johnny Mercer (words), Jerome Kern (music)	"I'm Old Fashioned"	Chet Baker (vocals), Kenny Drew (piano), George Morrow (bass), Philly Joe Jones (drums) Label: RIVERSIDE OJCCD-303-2.
25 Dec 2011	Andrew Lloyd Webber	Narrator	"Love Never Dies" from Love Never Dies (excerpt)	Katherine Jenkins Label: DECCA 5336610.
25 Dec 2011	Andrew Lloyd Webber	Sergei Prokofiev	"Cinderella's Departure for the Ball" from Cinderella Act I	Cleveland Orchestra/Vladimir Ashkenazy Label: DECCA 4101622.
25 Dec 2011	Andrew Lloyd Webber	Britten	"Dawn" from Sea Interludes (Peter Grimes Op. 33)	London Symphony Orchestra/Steuart Bedford Label: COLLINS CLASSICS 10192COL.
25 Dec 2011	Andrew Lloyd Webber	Puccini	Music from La Boheme Act II	Placido Domingo (Rodolfo), Montserrat Caballé (Mimi), Sherrill Milnes (Marcello), Judith Biegen (Musetta), Ruggero Raimondi (Colline), Vicente Sardinero (Schaunard), Nico Castel (Alcindoro), The John Alldis Choir, London Philharmonic Orchestra/Georg Solti Label: RCA 80371.
25 Dec 2011	Andrew Lloyd Webber	Shostakovich	1st movement from Cello Concerto No. 1 in E♭ major, Op. 107	Mstislav Rostropovich (cello), Philadelphia Orchestra/Eugene Ormandy Label: SONY CLASSICAL MHK63327.
25 Dec 2011	Andrew Lloyd Webber	Leonard Bernstein	Prologue	The original soundtrack recording (conducted by Johnny Green) Label: CBS 4676062.
25 Dec 2011	Andrew Lloyd Webber	Rachmaninov	"How Fair This Spot" from 12 Songs Op. 21, No. 7	Anna Netrebko (soprano), Orchestra of the Mariinsky Theatre/Valery Gergiev Label: DG 4776384.
25 Dec 2011	Andrew Lloyd Webber	Sergei Prokofiev	3rd movement from Piano Sonata No. 7 in B♭ major Op. 83	Martha Argerich (piano) Label: Live in the Concertgebouw (EMI).
25 Dec 2011	Andrew Lloyd Webber	Richard Rodgers & Oscar Hammerstein II	"Some Enchanted Evening" from South Pacific	Giorgio Tozzi (from the original soundtrack recording)

== 2012 ==
Date	Guest	Composer	Title	Performer / Label
8 Jan 2012	Tamara Rojo	Tchaikovsky	Swan Lake (Prologue to Act I)	London Symphony Orchestra/André Previn Label: EMI CDS 749531-2.
8 Jan 2012	Tamara Rojo	Mahler	"The Song of the Earth" [Das Lied von der Erde] (end of last song, Der Abschied)	Janet Baker (mezzo-soprano), Royal Concertgebouw Orchestra/Bernard Haitink Label: PHILIPS 432 279-2.
8 Jan 2012	Tamara Rojo	Rodion Shchedrin	Torero and Carmen (from Carmen Suite)	Russian National Orchestra/Mikhael Pletnev Label: DG 471 136-2.
8 Jan 2012	Tamara Rojo	Arvo Pärt	"Spiegel im Spiegel"	Tasmin Little (violin), Martin Roscoe (piano) Label: VIRGIN VTDCD408.
8 Jan 2012	Tamara Rojo	Bach	Variation 25 (from the Goldberg Variations)	Murray Perahia (piano) Label: SONY SK 89243.
8 Jan 2012	Tamara Rojo	Elgar	Cello Concerto in E minor (first movement)	Jacqueline Du Pré (cello), LSO/John Barbirolli Label: EMI 567341-2.
8 Jan 2012	Tamara Rojo	Traditional music	"Granada"	Paco de Lucia, Andres Battista and Maolo San Lucar (guitars) Label: DIVUCSA MUSIC 2197.
26 Feb 2012	Tacita Dean	Henry Purcell	Sound the Trumpet (Come ye Sons of Art)	Alfred & Mark Deller, The Deller Consort Label: VANGUARD 08506071.
26 Feb 2012	Tacita Dean	Gregorio Allegri	Miserere	Choir of King's College Cambridge/Sir David Willcocks Treble Soloist: Roy Goodman Label: DECCA 4211472.
26 Feb 2012	Tacita Dean	Shostakovich	2nd movement from Sonata No. 4 for Cello & Piano in D minor (Op. 40)	Stephen Isserlis (cello), Olli Mustonen (piano) Label: RCA 09026684372.
26 Feb 2012	Tacita Dean	Ravel	1st movement from Sonatine	Robert Casadesus (piano) Label: Sony Classical MP2K46733.
26 Feb 2012	Tacita Dean	Leoš Janáček	1st movement from String Quartet No. 2	Smetana Quartet (In Prague Concert). Label: Supraphon CO1130.
26 Feb 2012	Tacita Dean	Miklós Rózsa	"Generique" from Providence	from the original motion picture soundtrack Label: CAM CSE085.
26 Feb 2012	Tacita Dean	Neil Young	"Like A Hurricane" (live)	Neil Young Label: WARNERS 7599272332.
11 Mar 2012	Trevor Peacock	Antonín Dvořák	1st movement of Symphony No. 8 in G major (Op. 88)	Philharmonia Orchestra/Andrew Davis Label: CBS M2YK45618.
11 Mar 2012	Trevor Peacock	William Walton	"Babylon was a great city" from Belshazzar's Feast	John Shirley-Quirk (baritone), London Symphony Orchestra & Chorus/André Previn Label: EMI CDC7476242.
11 Mar 2012	Trevor Peacock	Ravel	"Prélude" from 'Le tombeau de Couperin	Anne Queffélec (piano) Label: VIRGIN CLASSICS VC7592332.
11 Mar 2012	Trevor Peacock	Ernest Tomlinson	"Dick's Maggot" from First Suite of English Folk-Dances	Slovak Radio Symphony Orchestra/Ernest Tomlinson Label: MARCO POLO 8223513.
11 Mar 2012	Trevor Peacock	Thomas Tallis	Fantasia on a Theme (excerpt)	London Philharmonic Orchestra/Vernon Handley Label: CFP CDCFPSD4754.
11 Mar 2012	Trevor Peacock	George Gershwin	"Gone" from Porgy & Bess	Cbs 4509852 Label: Miles Davis (Orchestra dir by Gil Evans).
11 Mar 2012	Trevor Peacock	Shostakovich	1st movement from Symphony No. 10 (Op. 93) (excerpt)	Emi Cdc7473502 Label: Philharmonia Orchestra/Simon Rattle.
11 Mar 2012	Trevor Peacock	Alain Romans	"Quel temps fait-il a Paris" from M. Hulot's Holiday	The original soundtrack recording Label: POLYGRAM 8369832POLYG.
18 Mar 2012	Paul Scharner	Mozart, Verdi, Grieg, Beethoven, Johann Strauss II, Mozart		
8 Apr 2012	Caroline Quentin	Britten, Chopin, Canteloube, Tchaikovsky, Mozart, Enrique Granados Arr. Andrés Segovia, Tchaikovsky		
15 Apr 2012	Keith Grant	Vaughan Williams, Arne Nordheim, Sibelius, Einojuhani Rautavaara, John McLeod, Britten, Wagner		
22 Apr 2012	Steven Berkoff	Darius Milhaud	La Creation du Monde (excerpt)	
22 Apr 2012	Steven Berkoff	Britten	"I Know a Bank" (A Midsummer Night's Dream, Act 1)	
22 Apr 2012	Steven Berkoff	Sergei Prokofiev	"The Death of Tybalt" (Romeo and Juliet)	
22 Apr 2012	Steven Berkoff	Traditional music	Refuge & Seven-fold Offering (Buddhist Vajra Chant)	
22 Apr 2012	Steven Berkoff	Beethoven	Piano Sonata in C minor, Op. 111 (2nd movement, excerpt)	
22 Apr 2012	Steven Berkoff	Traditional Balinese	"The Monkey Dance" (Bacak)	
22 Apr 2012	Steven Berkoff	Paul Dessau	"The Marching Song" (Mother Courage)	
22 Apr 2012	Steven Berkoff	Richard Rodgers	"My Funny Valentine"	
6 May 2012	Lord Ashdown	Strauss, Elgar, Beethoven, Puccini, Aleksa Šantić, Mozart		
13 May 2012	Craig Revel Horwood	Mozart	Don Giovanni (Overture)	
13 May 2012	Craig Revel Horwood	Puccini	La Boheme (Musetta's Waltz-Song)	
13 May 2012	Craig Revel Horwood	Astor Piazzolla & Osvaldo Pugliese	"La Yumba" / "Adios Nonino"	
13 May 2012	Craig Revel Horwood	Narrator	"As If We Never Said Goodbye" (Sunset Boulevard)	
13 May 2012	Craig Revel Horwood	Verdi	La Traviata (Prelude: Act 1)	
13 May 2012	Craig Revel Horwood	Henry Krieger	"And I Am Telling You I'm Not Going" (Dreamgirls)	
13 May 2012	Craig Revel Horwood	Lehár	Meine Lippen die kussen so Heiss (Giuditta)	
13 May 2012	Craig Revel Horwood	Sting	"Fields of Gold"	
20 May 2012	Tessa Hadley	Monteverdi	"Pur ti miro, pur ti godo" (final duet from L'incoronazione di Poppea)	Helen Donath (Poppea), Elisabeth Södeström (Nero), Concentus Musicus, Vienna/ Nikolaus Harnoncourt Label: TELDEC 8.35247.
20 May 2012	Tessa Hadley	Geoff Nichols	Hulot	Avon Cities Jazz Band Label: AVON CITIES ACCD50.
20 May 2012	Tessa Hadley	Béla Bartók	6 Romanian Folk Dances [BB68, Sz56], Nos 1, 2 and 6	Zoltan Kocsis (piano) Label: PHILIPS 478 2364.
20 May 2012	Tessa Hadley	Schubert	Piano Trio in E♭ major, D.929 (2nd movement)	Renaud Capuçon. Gautier Capuçon. Frank Braley Les Musiciens Label: HARMONIA MUNDI CD 1951047.
20 May 2012	Tessa Hadley	Bob Dylan	"Don't Think Twice, It's All Right"	Bob Dylan Label: COLUMBIA COL CD 32390.
20 May 2012	Tessa Hadley	Richard Strauss	Metamorphosen	Berlin Philharmonic Orchestra/Herbert von Karajan Label: DG 410 892-2.
20 May 2012	Tessa Hadley	Mozart	"Ah chi mi dice mai…" (Terzetto from Don Giovanni, Act I)	Kiri Te Kanawa (Donna Elvira), Ruggero Raimondi (Don Giovanni), José Van Dam (Leporello) Orchestra of the Paris Opera, /Lorin Maazel Label: CBS M3K35192.
20 May 2012	Tessa Hadley	Beethoven	String Quartet in B♭, Op. 130 (II. Presto)	Amadeus Quartet Label: Deutsche Grammophon DG 423 473-2.
20 May 2012	Tessa Hadley	Duke Ellington	"Backward Country Boy Blues"	Duke Ellington (piano), Charlie Mingus (bass), Max Roach (drums) Label: BLUE NOTE 538227-2.
27 May 2012	Matthew Fort	Mozart, Schubert, Gerald Finzi, Verdi, Atahualpa Yupanqui, Rossini, Charles-Valentin Alkan		
3 Jun 2012	Carol Ann Duffy	Chopin	Etude in E major, Op. 10, No. 3	
3 Jun 2012	Carol Ann Duffy	Mozart	Tamino Mein! (Die Zauberflote)	
3 Jun 2012	Carol Ann Duffy	Engelbert Humperdinck	The Sandman and Prayer scene (Hansel und Gretel)	
3 Jun 2012	Carol Ann Duffy	Mozart	Le Nozze di Figaro (Act IV Finale)	
3 Jun 2012	Carol Ann Duffy	Traditional Irish	"Danny Boy"	
3 Jun 2012	Carol Ann Duffy	Bach	Concerto in D minor for 2 violins, BWV 1043 (2nd movement)	
3 Jun 2012	Carol Ann Duffy	David Rose	"The Stripper"	
10 Jun 2012	Celia Imrie	Dmitri Shostakovich	Piano Concerto No. 2 in F, Op. 102 (2nd movement: Andante)	
10 Jun 2012	Celia Imrie	Johannes Brahms	Violin Concerto in D, Op. 77 (Finale)	
10 Jun 2012	Celia Imrie	Josef Suk	Love Song, Op. 7, No. 1	
10 Jun 2012	Celia Imrie	Gustave Charpentier	"Depuis le jour" (Louise)	
10 Jun 2012	Celia Imrie	Sergei Prokofiev	Cinderella's Waltz (Cinderella, act 1)	
10 Jun 2012	Celia Imrie	Giacomo Puccini	"Vissi d'arte", from Tosca, act 2	
10 Jun 2012	Celia Imrie	John Barry	"Diamonds are Forever"	
17 Jun 2012	David Phillip	Traditional music	"Go Down Moses"	Louis Armstrong.
17 Jun 2012	David Phillip	Verdi	La Donna e mobile (Rigoletto)	Orchestra: Vienna Philharmonic. Conductor: Carlo Maria Giulini. Singer: Plácido Domingo.
17 Jun 2012	David Phillip	Puccini	Recondita Armonia (Tosca)	Singer: Beniamino Gigli.
17 Jun 2012	David Phillip	Verdi	"Va Pensiero" (Nabucco)	Orchestra: Philharmonia Orchestra. Conductor: Riccardo Muti. Choir: Ambrosian Singers.
17 Jun 2012	David Phillip	Scott Joplin	Treemonisha (Overture & Act 3 Aria)	Orchestra: Houston Grand Opera Orchestra. Conductor: Gunther Schuller. Singer: Willard White.
17 Jun 2012	David Phillip	Dave Brubeck	"Blue Rondo a la Turk"	Ensemble: The Brubeck Brothers.
17 Jun 2012	David Phillip	Traditional music	"How Great Thou Art"	Singer: Mahalia Jackson.
24 Jun 2012	D. R. Thorpe	Wagner, Elgar, Vaughan Williams, Strauss, Sibelius, Britten, Butterworth		
1 Jul 2012	Brian Blessed	William Walton	4th movement from Symphony No. 1 in B♭ minor	Royal Philharmonic Orchestra/Vladimir Ashkenazy Label: DECCA 4337032.
1 Jul 2012	Brian Blessed	Ravel	"Lever du Jour" from Daphnis et Chloé (Suite No. 2)	London Symphony Orchestra/Louis Fremaux Label: COLLINS CLASSICS EC10242.
1 Jul 2012	Brian Blessed	Leoš Janáček	1st movement from Sinfonietta	Czech Philharmonic Orchestra/Václav Neumann Label: SUPRAPHON 1120002.
1 Jul 2012	Brian Blessed	Wagner	Final moments from Götterdämmerung	Rita Hunter (soprano), London Philharmonic Orchestra/Sir Charles Mackerras Label: CLASSICS FOR PLEASURE CDCFP4670.
1 Jul 2012	Brian Blessed	Holst	"Neptune, the Mystic" from The Planets, Op. 32 by Holst	Chicago Symphony Orchestra & Chorus/James Levine Label: DG 4297302.
1 Jul 2012	Brian Blessed	Jean Sibelius	Finale' from Symphony No. 2 in D, Op. 43	City of Birmingham Symphony Orchestra/Simon Rattle Label: EMI CDM7641202.
8 Jul 2012	Judith Kerr	Julia Kerr	"Der Chronoplan"	
8 Jul 2012	Judith Kerr	Mozart	Don Giovanni (Final Scene)	
8 Jul 2012	Judith Kerr	Moshe Stern	"El Malei Rachamim" (Jewish Memorial Prayer)	
8 Jul 2012	Judith Kerr	Beethoven	Symphony No. 7 in A, Op. 92 (2nd movement: Allegretto)	
8 Jul 2012	Judith Kerr	Holst	Mars (The Bringer of War) from The Planets – Suite, Op. 32	
8 Jul 2012	Judith Kerr	Sergei Prokofiev	"Dance of the Knights" (Romeo and Juliet)	
8 Jul 2012	Judith Kerr	Mozart	Kyrie (Mass in C minor, K.427)	
15 Jul 2012	Mark Wallinger	Tchaikovsky, Procol Harum, Shostakovich, Schubert, Copland, Bach, Allegri		
22 Jul 2012	Anne Reid	Ralph Vaughan Williams	The Wasps – Overture	
22 Jul 2012	Anne Reid	John Ireland	April	
22 Jul 2012	Anne Reid	Liszt	"Un Sospiro" (Etudes de concert, No. 3)	
22 Jul 2012	Anne Reid	Eric Coates	Springtime in Angus: Elizabeth of Glamis (Three Elizabeths Suite)	
22 Jul 2012	Anne Reid	Meredith Willson	"My White Knight" (The Music Man)	
22 Jul 2012	Anne Reid	Ennio Morricone	"Deborah's Theme" (Once Upon a Time in America)	
22 Jul 2012	Anne Reid	Bill Evans	Children's Play Song	
29 Jul 2012	Sir Adrian Cadbury	Beethoven	Symphony No. 1 (1st movement)	
29 Jul 2012	Sir Adrian Cadbury	Puccini	"Che gelida manina" (La Boheme)	
29 Jul 2012	Sir Adrian Cadbury	Mozart	"Non piu andrai" (Regimental slow march of the Coldstream Guards)	
29 Jul 2012	Sir Adrian Cadbury	Elizabeth Poston	"Jesus Christ the apple tree"	
29 Jul 2012	Sir Adrian Cadbury	Simon Jeffes	"Air a danser"	
29 Jul 2012	Sir Adrian Cadbury	Verdi	"Va pensiero" (Chorus of the Hebrew Slaves, Nabucco)	
29 Jul 2012	Sir Adrian Cadbury	Sergei Prokofiev	"Kije's Wedding" (Lieutenant Kije Suite)	
29 Jul 2012	Sir Adrian Cadbury	Chopin	Prelude in D♭ major (Raindrop) Op. 28, No.15	
5 Aug 2012	Vangelis	Debussy	Sonata for flute, viola and harp (3rd mov)	
5 Aug 2012	Vangelis	Stravinsky	The Rite of Spring (opening)	
5 Aug 2012	Vangelis	Bach	Prelude (Suite No. 1 in G major, BWV 1007)	
5 Aug 2012	Vangelis	Rachmaninov	Variation No. 18 (Rhapsody on a Theme of Paganini)	
5 Aug 2012	Vangelis	Wagner	Tristan und Isolde: Prelude to Act 1	
5 Aug 2012	Vangelis	Mozart	Flute and Harp Concerto in C, K.299 (2nd movement)	
5 Aug 2012	Vangelis	George Gershwin	"Gone" (Porgy and Bess), arr. Gil Evans	
12 Aug 2012	Es Devlin	Britten	"Welcome Wanderer" (A Midsummer Night's Dream, Act 1)	
12 Aug 2012	Es Devlin	Traditional music	"Ghiore Dos" (Teasing)	
12 Aug 2012	Es Devlin	Wagner	Verwandlungsmusik (Transformation Music) (Parsifal)	
12 Aug 2012	Es Devlin	Kanye West	"Diamonds from Sierra Leone"	
12 Aug 2012	Es Devlin	Berlioz	"Trojan March" (Les Troyens)	
12 Aug 2012	Es Devlin	Kate Bush	"The Man with the Child in his Eyes"	
12 Aug 2012	Es Devlin	Leoš Janáček	"Odesli" (Jenufa)	
12 Aug 2012	Es Devlin	Keith Jarrett	The Koln Concert (Part 1, excerpt)	
12 Aug 2012	Es Devlin	Bob Dylan	"I Shall Be Released"	
19 Aug 2012	Miriam Margolyes	Rossini	"Nacqui all'affano... non piu mesta" (Cenerentola)	
19 Aug 2012	Miriam Margolyes	Schubert	Piano Quintet in A (Trout) (4th movement)	
19 Aug 2012	Miriam Margolyes	Mozart	"Der Holle Rache" (Die Zauberflote)	
19 Aug 2012	Miriam Margolyes	Secunda	"Adonay, Adonay" (Kol Nidrei)	
19 Aug 2012	Miriam Margolyes	Elgar	Cello Concerto in E minor (1st movement)	
19 Aug 2012	Miriam Margolyes	Hubert Parry	"Jerusalem"	
19 Aug 2012	Miriam Margolyes	Freddie Mercury & Montserrat Caballé	"Barcelona"	
16 Sep 2012	Fay Weldon	Handel	"All we like sheep" (Messiah)	
16 Sep 2012	Fay Weldon	Wagner	Siegfried (Act 3, opening)	
16 Sep 2012	Fay Weldon	Sergei Prokofiev	The Burial of Kije (Lieutenant Kije)	
16 Sep 2012	Fay Weldon	Handel	"Angels ever bright and fair" (Theodora)	
16 Sep 2012	Fay Weldon	Bach	"O du von Gott erhohte Kreatur" (Cantata No. 121)	
16 Sep 2012	Fay Weldon	Charles Ives	"The Cage"	
16 Sep 2012	Fay Weldon	Nick Fox	"In the name of the Mother"	
23 Sep 2012	Joe Wright	Trad arr., Burgess, Max Richter, Anoushka Shankar, Dario Marianelli, Ravi Shankar & Philip Glass, Leoš Janáček, Beethoven		
7 Oct 2012	Michèle Roberts	Bach	"Gloria Patri" (Magnificat in D, BWV 243)	Ensemble: La Chapelle Royale. Choir: Collegium Vocale Gent. Conductor: Philippe Herreweghe.
7 Oct 2012	Michèle Roberts	Bach	Sarabande (Cello Suite No.1 in G, BWV 1007)	Pau Casals.
7 Oct 2012	Michèle Roberts	Jacques Brel	"La Chanson des vieux amants"	Singer: Jacques Brel.
7 Oct 2012	Michèle Roberts	Bob Dylan	"Tangled up in Blue"	Singer: Bob Dylan.
7 Oct 2012	Michèle Roberts	Handel	"Oh Thou that tellest good tidings to Zion" (Messiah)	Orchestra: London Philharmonic Orchestra. Conductor: Adrian Boult. Singer: Kathleen Ferrier.
7 Oct 2012	Michèle Roberts	Handel	Sorga pure dall'orrido averno (Donna che in ciel di tanta luce splendi, HWV.233)	Ensemble: Musica Antiqua Köln. Conductor: Reinhard Goebel. Singer: Anne Sofie von Otter.
7 Oct 2012	Michèle Roberts	Hildegard von Bingen	Ave generosa	Singer: Margaret Philpot. Choir: Gothic Voices. Conductor: Christopher Page.
7 Oct 2012	Michèle Roberts	Tiago Machado	Poetas	Singer: M
14 Oct 2012	Arlene Phillips	Leonard Bernstein	"Dance at the Gym", from West Side Story	
14 Oct 2012	Arlene Phillips	Tchaikovsky	Sleeping Beauty (Act 2, sc. 1 excerpt)	
14 Oct 2012	Arlene Phillips	Narrator	Variations (Theme and variations 1–4)	
14 Oct 2012	Arlene Phillips	Claude-Michel Schönberg	"Bring Him Home" (Les Miserables)	
14 Oct 2012	Arlene Phillips	Mozart	Lacrimosa (Requiem, K626)	
14 Oct 2012	Arlene Phillips	Ferdinand Herold & John Lanchbery	Clog Dance (La Fille mal gardee)	
14 Oct 2012	Arlene Phillips	Philip Glass	Dance 9 (In the Upper Room)	
14 Oct 2012	Arlene Phillips	Johann Pachelbel	Canon in D	
14 Oct 2012	Arlene Phillips	Juan Larenza	Flores del Alma	
21 Oct 2012	Sir Tim Smit	Dave Brubeck	"Blue Rondo a la Turk"	
21 Oct 2012	Sir Tim Smit	Beethoven	Sonata in C♯ minor, Op. 27, No. 2 (Moonlight) (1st movement)	
21 Oct 2012	Sir Tim Smit	Vladimir Cosma	"Promenade Sentimentale" (Diva)	
21 Oct 2012	Sir Tim Smit	Alfredo Catalani	"Ebben, Ne andro lontano" (La Wally)	
21 Oct 2012	Sir Tim Smit	Chopin	Polonaise in A♭ Op. 53 (Eroica)	
21 Oct 2012	Sir Tim Smit	Rachmaninov	Rhapsody on a Theme of Paganini	Alexander Gavrylyuk. Orchestra: BBC Philharmonic.
21 Oct 2012	Sir Tim Smit	Frederick Loewe	"I Could Have Danced All Night" (My Fair Lady)	
21 Oct 2012	Sir Tim Smit	Thelonious Monk	"Round Midnight"	
28 Oct 2012	Dame Linda Partridge	Chopin	Les Sylphides (No. 2: Nocturne)	
28 Oct 2012	Dame Linda Partridge	Bizet	"L'Amour est un oiseau rebelle" (Carmen, Act 1)	
28 Oct 2012	Dame Linda Partridge	Britten	Missa Brevis, Op. 68 (Kyrie)	
28 Oct 2012	Dame Linda Partridge	Béla Bartók	"Duke Bluebeard's Castle" (3rd and 4th Doors)	
28 Oct 2012	Dame Linda Partridge	Wagner	Das Rheingold (Prelude)	
28 Oct 2012	Dame Linda Partridge	Philip Glass	Glassworks (Opening)	
28 Oct 2012	Dame Linda Partridge	Johann Joachim Quantz	Flute Concerto in G major (1st movement: Allegro)	
11 Nov 2012	Dan Snow	Jean Sibelius	Symphony No. 2, Op. 43 (3rd movement)	
11 Nov 2012	Dan Snow	Mozart	Clarinet Quintet in A (K. 581) (2nd movement)	
11 Nov 2012	Dan Snow	Trevor Jones	Promentory (The Last of the Mohicans)	
11 Nov 2012	Dan Snow	Traditional Welsh	"Suo gan"	
11 Nov 2012	Dan Snow	Beethoven	Symphony No. 6 (Pastoral) (Finale)	
11 Nov 2012	Dan Snow	Elgar	"Nimrod" (Enigma Variations, Op. 36)	
11 Nov 2012	Dan Snow	Tchaikovsky	1812 Overture (excerpt)	
18 Nov 2012	Charles Williams	Monteverdi	Duo Seraphim (Vespers of 1610)	
18 Nov 2012	Charles Williams	Messiaen	"Abime des Oiseaux" (Quartet for the End of Time)	
18 Nov 2012	Charles Williams	Domenico Modugno	"Volare"	
18 Nov 2012	Charles Williams	Mozart	Serenade in C minor, K. 388 (1st movement)	
18 Nov 2012	Charles Williams	Brahms	"Ruf zu Maria" (Marienlieder, Op. 22)	
18 Nov 2012	Charles Williams	Alban Berg	Four Pieces for Clarinet and Piano, Op. 5 (No. 1)	
18 Nov 2012	Charles Williams	Berlioz	Lacrymosa (Grande Messe des Morts)	
25 Nov 2012	Thomas Keneally	Mozart	Requiem in D minor, K. 626: Lacrimosa	
25 Nov 2012	Thomas Keneally	Elgar	Violin Concerto in B minor, Op. 61 (2nd movement, excerpt)	
25 Nov 2012	Thomas Keneally	Bach	"Zion hört die Wächter singen" (No. 4 from Wachet auf, ruft uns die Stimme, BWV 140)	
25 Nov 2012	Thomas Keneally	John Williams	Schindler's List – Main Theme	Itzhak Perlman. Conductor: John Williams. Orchestra: Boston Symphony Orchestra. Label: MCA.
25 Nov 2012	Thomas Keneally	Handel	"Lascia ch'io pianga" (Rinaldo)	
25 Nov 2012	Thomas Keneally	Percy Grainger	"Colleen Dhas"	
25 Nov 2012	Thomas Keneally	Filippo Azzaiolo	"Chi passa per 'sta strada"	
25 Nov 2012	Thomas Keneally	Joseph Canteloube	Bailero (Songs of the Auvergne)	
2 Dec 2012	Sir John Major	Johann Strauss II	Overture: Die Fledermaus	
2 Dec 2012	Sir John Major	George Ware & Noel Coward	"The Boy I love is up in the gallery"/"Mad about the boy"	
2 Dec 2012	Sir John Major	George Botsford	"Black and White Rag"	
2 Dec 2012	Sir John Major	Gounod	"Ave Maria"	
2 Dec 2012	Sir John Major	Aram Khachaturian	Adagio of Spartacus and Phrygia (Spartacus)	
2 Dec 2012	Sir John Major	Jacques Offenbach	"Conduisez-moi vers celui qui j'adore" (Robinson Crusoe)	
2 Dec 2012	Sir John Major	Britten	Young Person's Guide to the Orchestra (Theme)	
2 Dec 2012	Sir John Major	Maurice Jarre	"Lara's Theme" (Doctor Zhivago)	
2 Dec 2012	Sir John Major	Richard Rodgers	"This Nearly Was Mine" (South Pacific)	
9 Dec 2012	Caroline Charles	Ali Farka Touré	Bonde	
9 Dec 2012	Caroline Charles	Beethoven	Violin Concerto in D, Op. 61 (2nd movement, excerpt)	
9 Dec 2012	Caroline Charles	Louis Moreau Gottschalk	"La Gallina" (Cuban Dance)	
9 Dec 2012	Caroline Charles	Shostakovich	Waltz (Jazz Suite No. 1)	
9 Dec 2012	Caroline Charles	George Gershwin	"Strike Up the Band"	
9 Dec 2012	Caroline Charles	Erik Satie	Gymnopedie No. 1	
9 Dec 2012	Caroline Charles	Mozart	Andante in C, K.315	
9 Dec 2012	Caroline Charles	Richard Strauss	"September" (Four Last Songs)	
9 Dec 2012	Caroline Charles	Dany Carvalho	Tchintchirote	
23 Dec 2012	Diana Rigg	Tchaikovsky	Piano Concerto No. 1 in B♭ minor, Op. 23 (1st movement, excerpt)	
23 Dec 2012	Diana Rigg	Schubert	Piano Quintet in A (Trout)D667 (4th movement)	
23 Dec 2012	Diana Rigg	Sting	"Fields of Gold"	
23 Dec 2012	Diana Rigg	Erik Satie	Gymnopedie No.1	
23 Dec 2012	Diana Rigg	Felix Mendelssohn	Overture: The Hebrides (Fingal's Cave)	
23 Dec 2012	Diana Rigg	Anonymous work arr. Philip Ledger	"Away in a Manger"	
30 Dec 2012	Simon Hoggart	Beethoven, Tallis, Piers Hellawell, Berlioz, Donizetti, Wagner, Mozart		

== 2013 ==
Date	Guest	Composer	Title	Performer / Label
6 Jan 2013	Stephen Tompkinson	Joaquín Rodrigo & Trevor Jones	"En Aranjuez con tu Amor" (Concierto de Aranjuez)	
6 Jan 2013	Stephen Tompkinson	Tchaikovsky	The Nutcracker (Act 1, tableau II)	
6 Jan 2013	Stephen Tompkinson	Sergei Prokofiev	Peter and the Wolf (opening)	
6 Jan 2013	Stephen Tompkinson	Scott Joplin	"Solace: A Mexican Serenade"	
6 Jan 2013	Stephen Tompkinson	Booker T. Jones	"Soul Limbo"	
6 Jan 2013	Stephen Tompkinson	Mozart	Requiem in D minor, K. 626: Lacrimosa	
6 Jan 2013	Stephen Tompkinson	Cole Porter	"Now You Has Jazz" (High Society)	
13 Jan 2013	Orhan Pamuk	Mozart	Piano Concerto No. 21 in C, K.467 – 2nd movement (andante)	
13 Jan 2013	Orhan Pamuk	Peppino di Capri	Melancolie	
13 Jan 2013	Orhan Pamuk	Tchaikovsky	1812 Overture (excerpt)	
13 Jan 2013	Orhan Pamuk	Dede Efendi	"Yine Bir Gul-nihal"	
13 Jan 2013	Orhan Pamuk	Chopin	Funeral March from Piano Sonata No. 2 in B minor, Op. 35 (arr. Elgar)	
13 Jan 2013	Orhan Pamuk	Shigeru Umebayashi	Yumeji's Theme from In the Mood for Love	
13 Jan 2013	Orhan Pamuk	Mahler	Symphony No. 5 in C♯ minor – 4th movement (excerpt)	
13 Jan 2013	Orhan Pamuk	Amy Winehouse and Mark Ronson	"Back to Black"	
27 Jan 2013	Lucy Hughes-Hallett	Anonymous work	Iqbalni-I-Yawm (Chant for Holy Thursday)	Singer: Marie Keyrouz. Choir: Choir of St Julien-Le-Pauvre.
27 Jan 2013	Lucy Hughes-Hallett	Debussy	Gloire (The Martyrdom of St Sebastian, 5th window, excerpt)	Choir: Narrator: Felicia Montealagre. – Choral Art Society. Orchestra: New York Philharmonic. Conductor: Leonard Bernstein.
27 Jan 2013	Lucy Hughes-Hallett	Handel	"V'adore pupille" (Giulio Cesare)	Singer: Barbara Schlick. Orchestra: Concerto Köln. Conductor: René Jacobs.
27 Jan 2013	Lucy Hughes-Hallett	Mick Jagger	"Under my Thumb"	Music Group: The Rolling Stones. Composer: Keith Richards.
27 Jan 2013	Lucy Hughes-Hallett	Monteverdi	L'Orfeo (Act II, excerpt)	Singer: Jennifer Larmore. Singer: Laurence Dale. Orchestra: Concerto Vocale. Conductor: René Jacobs.
27 Jan 2013	Lucy Hughes-Hallett	Verdi	Otello (Act 1, sc. iii, excerpt)	Singer: Jon Vickers. Singer: Mirella Freni. Orchestra: Berlin Philharmonic. Conductor: Herbert von Karajan.
3 Feb 2013	Sir George Young MP	Arthur Sullivan	"When the foeman bares his steel" (Pirates of Penzance, Act II)	
3 Feb 2013	Sir George Young MP	Verdi	"Dio, che nell'alma infondere" (Don Carlos, Act II, sc. 1)	
3 Feb 2013	Sir George Young MP	Haydn	"Et resurrexit" (Nelson Mass)	
3 Feb 2013	Sir George Young MP	Mozart	"Il mio tesoro" (Don Giovanni, Act II, sc. 2)	
3 Feb 2013	Sir George Young MP	Donizetti	"Cum sancto spiritu" (Messa di Gloria)	
3 Feb 2013	Sir George Young MP	Schubert	Quartettsatz in C minor, D.703	
3 Feb 2013	Sir George Young MP	Scott Joplin	"Maple Leaf Rag"	
3 Feb 2013	Sir George Young MP	Johann Nepomuk Hummel	Octet Partita in E♭ (Finale: Vivace assai)	
17 Feb 2013	Fiona Sampson	Felix Mendelssohn	Octet in E♭ major, Op.20 (1st movement, excerpt)	
17 Feb 2013	Fiona Sampson	Béla Bartók	Music for Strings, Percussion and Celeste, Sz.106 (2nd movement)	
17 Feb 2013	Fiona Sampson	Traditional music	"Gde si bilo jare moje" [Where is my little goat]	
17 Feb 2013	Fiona Sampson	Bach	Partita No.3 in E major (Prelude)	
17 Feb 2013	Fiona Sampson	Ralph Vaughan Williams	"Bredon Hill" (On Wenlock Edge)	
17 Feb 2013	Fiona Sampson	Beethoven	String Quartet in A minor, Op. 132 (5th movement)	
3 Mar 2013	Jared Diamond	Bach	Jesu meine Freude, BWV 610	
3 Mar 2013	Jared Diamond	Beethoven	Violin Sonata in G, Op. 96 (3rd movement: Scherzo)	
3 Mar 2013	Jared Diamond	Bach	Fugue in E♭ major BWV 552 (St Anne)	
3 Mar 2013	Jared Diamond	Schubert	Erlkonig D.328	
3 Mar 2013	Jared Diamond	Brahms	Sextet in B♭ major, Op. 18 (2nd movement: Theme and variations)	
3 Mar 2013	Jared Diamond	Bach	"Nun ist das Heil und die Kraft" (from Cantata No. 50)	
3 Mar 2013	Jared Diamond	C. P. E. Bach	Magnificat (Opening chorus)	
3 Mar 2013	Jared Diamond	Richard Strauss	Fruhling (Four Last Songs)	
31 Mar 2013	Dame Janet Suzman	Bach	Contrapunctus 13 (The Art of Fugue)	
31 Mar 2013	Dame Janet Suzman	Shostakovich	Prelude and Fugue in A minor, Op. 87 No. 2	
31 Mar 2013	Dame Janet Suzman	Ravel	Forlane (Le Tombeau de Couperin)	
31 Mar 2013	Dame Janet Suzman	Bach	Allemande (Cello Suite No. 1 in G, BWV 1007)	
31 Mar 2013	Dame Janet Suzman	William Byrd	Hughe Ashton's Ground	
31 Mar 2013	Dame Janet Suzman	Henry Purcell	Chaconne (King Arthur)	
31 Mar 2013	Dame Janet Suzman	Traditional music	"Qongqothwane" (Xhosa wedding song)	
31 Mar 2013	Dame Janet Suzman	Monteverdi	"Tu sei morta" (L'Orfeo)	
31 Mar 2013	Dame Janet Suzman	Leonard Bernstein	West Side Story (Prologue)	
14 Apr 2013	Declan Donnellan	Beethoven	Overture: The Creatures of Prometheus, Op. 43	
14 Apr 2013	Declan Donnellan	Traditional music	"The Irish Washerwoman"	
14 Apr 2013	Declan Donnellan	Traditional music	"Siege of Ennis"/"Mason's Apron"	
14 Apr 2013	Declan Donnellan	Shostakovich	Symphony No.5	
14 Apr 2013	Declan Donnellan	Ferdinand Hérold	Colas' Solo (Pas de deux, La Fille Mal Gardee)	
14 Apr 2013	Declan Donnellan	Stephen Sondheim	"Sunday" (Sunday in the Park with George)	
14 Apr 2013	Declan Donnellan	Adolphe Adam	Giselle (Finale, Act I)	
14 Apr 2013	Declan Donnellan	Henry Mancini	"Moon River"	
14 Apr 2013	Declan Donnellan	Traditional music	Batucada: Olha a Virada	
21 Apr 2013	Aleksandar Hemon	Traditional music	Jutros mi je ruza Procvjetala	
21 Apr 2013	Aleksandar Hemon	Bach	"Blute nur, du liebes Herz" (St Matthew Passion)	
21 Apr 2013	Aleksandar Hemon	David Bowie	"Heroes"	
21 Apr 2013	Aleksandar Hemon	Charles Mingus	"Boogie Stop Shuffle"	
21 Apr 2013	Aleksandar Hemon	Duke Ellington	"Isfahan" (Far East Suite)	
21 Apr 2013	Aleksandar Hemon	Mahler	Symphony No. 5 (3rd movement: Adagietto)	
12 May 2013	Jonathan Hyde	Shostakovich	Piano Trio in E minor, Op. 67 (1st movement)	
12 May 2013	Jonathan Hyde	Bizet	"Je dis que rien ne m'epouvante" (Carmen, Act III)	
12 May 2013	Jonathan Hyde	Stravinsky	Apollon musagete (excerpt)	
12 May 2013	Jonathan Hyde	Gabriela Quintero & Rodrigo Sanchez	"Diablo Rojo"	
12 May 2013	Jonathan Hyde	Britten	Variations on a Theme of Frank Bridge, Op. 10 (excerpt)	
12 May 2013	Jonathan Hyde	Handel	"Care Selve" (Atalanta)	
12 May 2013	Jonathan Hyde	Michael Price & Dan Walsh	"Ain't No Love"	
12 May 2013	Jonathan Hyde	Traditional music	"I Know Where I'm Going"	
19 May 2013	Harriet Harman	Béla Bartók	"Duke Bluebeard's Castle" (Fifth Door)	
19 May 2013	Harriet Harman	Mozart	Serenade in B♭, K.361 (3rd movement: Adagio)	
19 May 2013	Harriet Harman	Reynaldo Hahn	A Chloris	
19 May 2013	Harriet Harman	Stravinsky	The Rite of Spring (Sacrificial Dance)	
19 May 2013	Harriet Harman	Leonard Bernstein	Symphonic Dances: West Side Story (Mambo)	
19 May 2013	Harriet Harman	Richard Rodgers	"People Will Say We're in Love" (Oklahoma)	
19 May 2013	Harriet Harman	Britten	The Turn of the Screw (Act 1, sc. 8: At Night)	
26 May 2013	Bruce Munro	Mozart	Ave verum corpus, K618	
26 May 2013	Bruce Munro	Beethoven	Symphony No. 5 in C minor, Op. 67 (1st movement)	
26 May 2013	Bruce Munro	Joaquín Rodrigo	Concierto de Aranjuez (1st movement)	
26 May 2013	Bruce Munro	Einojuhani Rautavaara	"Melancholy" (Cantus Arcticus, Op. 61)	
26 May 2013	Bruce Munro	Samuel Sebastian Wesley	"Lead me, Lord" (Praise the Lord, O my soul)	
26 May 2013	Bruce Munro	Sergei Prokofiev	"Morning Serenade" (Romeo and Juliet, Act III)	
26 May 2013	Bruce Munro	Johann Strauss	"The Blue Danube", Op. 314	
2 Jun 2013	Gwyneth Lewis	Brahms	Alto Rhapsody, extract	
2 Jun 2013	Gwyneth Lewis	Verdi	Bella Figlia d'amore, from Rigoletto	
2 Jun 2013	Gwyneth Lewis	Bach	Agnus Dei (Mass in B minor)	
2 Jun 2013	Gwyneth Lewis	Francis Poulenc	Dialogues des Carmelites (Act 3, tableau 4: Salve Regina)	
2 Jun 2013	Gwyneth Lewis	Charles Trenet	La Mer	
2 Jun 2013	Gwyneth Lewis	Mozart	"Soave sia il vento", from Cosi fan Tutte	
2 Jun 2013	Gwyneth Lewis	Béla Bartók	String Quartet No. 1 (3rd movement: Allegro vivace)	
2 Jun 2013	Gwyneth Lewis	Traditional Welsh	"Lisa Lân"	
9 Jun 2013	Sean O'Brien	Schubert	Die Stadt (Schwanengesang)	
9 Jun 2013	Sean O'Brien	Johnny Mercer	"Too Marvellous for Words"	
9 Jun 2013	Sean O'Brien	Joseph Kosma	"Autumn Leaves"	
9 Jun 2013	Sean O'Brien	Steve Reich	"America Before the War" (Different Trains)	
9 Jun 2013	Sean O'Brien	Lowell George	"Spanish Moon"	
9 Jun 2013	Sean O'Brien	Ralph Vaughan Williams	"I have trod the upward and the downward slope" (Songs of Travel)	
9 Jun 2013	Sean O'Brien	Sergei Prokofiev	"The Battle on the Ice" (Alexander Nevsky)	
9 Jun 2013	Sean O'Brien	Debussy	Dialogue du vent et de la mer (La Mer)	
23 Jun 2013	Paul Muldoon	Cole Porter	"You're the Top"	
23 Jun 2013	Paul Muldoon	Cecil Frances Alexander	"There is a Green Hill Far Away"	
23 Jun 2013	Paul Muldoon	Mark-Anthony Turnage	"Fractured Lines"	
23 Jun 2013	Paul Muldoon	Stravinsky	No Word from Tom – Act 1, sc.3 from The Rake's Progress	
23 Jun 2013	Paul Muldoon	Hamilton Harty	"Polka", from A John Field Suite	
23 Jun 2013	Paul Muldoon	Kurt Weill	"September Song"	
23 Jun 2013	Paul Muldoon	Donnacha Dennehy	"That The Night Come: These are the Clouds", from Gra agus Bas	
23 Jun 2013	Paul Muldoon	James Alan Hetfield, Lars Ulrich & Kirk L. Hammett	"Enter Sandman"	
30 Jun 2013	Rufus Wainwright	Walter Donaldson	"My Baby Just Cares for Me"	
30 Jun 2013	Rufus Wainwright	Harold Arlen	"Come Rain or Come Shine"	
30 Jun 2013	Rufus Wainwright	Francesco Corbetta	Sarabande La Victoire	
30 Jun 2013	Rufus Wainwright	Messiaen	L'Ange se prepare a jouer de la viole (St Francois d'Assise)	
30 Jun 2013	Rufus Wainwright	Jules Massenet	Meditation (Thais)	
30 Jun 2013	Rufus Wainwright	Kurt Weill	"Surabaya Johnny"	
30 Jun 2013	Rufus Wainwright	Verdi	"Rex Tremendae" (Requiem)	
30 Jun 2013	Rufus Wainwright	Berlioz	"L'Absence" (Les Nuits d'Ete)	
30 Jun 2013	Rufus Wainwright	Manuel de Falla	"Ritual Fire Dance" (El Amor Brujo)	
7 Jul 2013	Ruth Rogers	Mozart	Sonata in C, K.545 (2nd movement – Andante)	
7 Jul 2013	Ruth Rogers	Mahler Chamber Orchestra	Agnes and the Boy (Written on Skin)	
7 Jul 2013	Ruth Rogers	Woody Guthrie	"This Land is Your Land"	
7 Jul 2013	Ruth Rogers	Beethoven	Symphony No. 7 in A, Op.92 (4th movement – Allegro con brio)	
7 Jul 2013	Ruth Rogers	Traditional music	"Hush Little Baby"	
7 Jul 2013	Ruth Rogers	Mozart	Laudate Dominum (Solemn Vespers, K.339)	
7 Jul 2013	Ruth Rogers	Schubert	Piano Quintet in A, D 667 (Trout) (3rd movement – Scherzo)	
7 Jul 2013	Ruth Rogers	Bob Dylan	"Girl From the North Country"	
7 Jul 2013	Ruth Rogers	Mozart	"Finch'han dal vino" (Don Giovanni)	
14 Jul 2013	Robert Macfarlane	Chopin	Berceuse in D♭ major, Op. 57	
14 Jul 2013	Robert Macfarlane	Messiaen	"Abime des Oiseaux" (Quartet for the End of Time)	
14 Jul 2013	Robert Macfarlane	Brahms	Piano Quartet No. 1 in G minor, Op. 25 (4th movement: Rondo alla Zingarese)	
14 Jul 2013	Robert Macfarlane	Traditional Scottish	Gaelic Psalms	
14 Jul 2013	Robert Macfarlane	Modest Mussorgsky	A Night on the Bare Mountain	
14 Jul 2013	Robert Macfarlane	Mahler	"Der Trunkene im Fruhling" (Das Lied von der Erde)	
21 Jul 2013	Lord Sacks	Paul Simon	"America"	
21 Jul 2013	Lord Sacks	Bach	Concerto in D major for two violins, BWV 1043 (1st movement)	
21 Jul 2013	Lord Sacks	Tchaikovsky	1812 Overture (excerpt)	
21 Jul 2013	Lord Sacks	Thomas Newman	"Brooks was here" (The Shawshank Redemption)	
21 Jul 2013	Lord Sacks	Beethoven	Cavatina (fifth movement from String Quartet in B♭, Op. 130) (excerpt)	
21 Jul 2013	Lord Sacks	Stravinsky	"The Shrovetide Fair" (Petrushka)	
21 Jul 2013	Lord Sacks	Mahler	Symphony No. 4 (3rd movement: Ruhevoll, excerpt)	
21 Jul 2013	Lord Sacks	Stephen Glass, Raymond Goldstein & Stephen Levey	Ashrei	
4 Aug 2013	Jocelyn Bell Burnell	Verdi	Chorus of the Hebrew Slaves (Nabucco)	
4 Aug 2013	Jocelyn Bell Burnell	Bedřich Smetana	Vltava (Ma Vlast)	
4 Aug 2013	Jocelyn Bell Burnell	Rachmaninov	Magnificat (All Night Vigil, Op.37)	
4 Aug 2013	Jocelyn Bell Burnell	Henry Purcell	"When I am Laid in Earth" (Dido and Aeneas)	
4 Aug 2013	Jocelyn Bell Burnell	Arvo Pärt	Cantus in Memory of Benjamin Britten	
4 Aug 2013	Jocelyn Bell Burnell	Haydn	"The Heavens are Telling" (The Creation)	
4 Aug 2013	Jocelyn Bell Burnell	Jean Sibelius	"At the Castle Gate" (Pelleas et Melisande)	
4 Aug 2013	Jocelyn Bell Burnell	Arthur Sullivan	Opening Dance (Pineapple Poll)	
11 Aug 2013	Adam Nicolson	Sergei Prokofiev	Peter and the Wolf, Op. 67	
11 Aug 2013	Adam Nicolson	Joseph Canteloube	Bailero (Chants d'Auvergne)	
11 Aug 2013	Adam Nicolson	Mozart	Symphony No.41 (Jupiter) (2nd movement: Andante Cantabile)	
11 Aug 2013	Adam Nicolson	Ewan MacColl	"The first time ever I saw your face"	
11 Aug 2013	Adam Nicolson	Eric Whitacre	"Lux Aurumque"	
11 Aug 2013	Adam Nicolson	Traditional music	"Bi Lamban"	
11 Aug 2013	Adam Nicolson	Felix Mendelssohn	The Hebrides Overture (Fingal's Cave) Op. 26	
18 Aug 2013	Sally Davies	Rossini	"Cujus animam gementem" (Stabat Mater)	
18 Aug 2013	Sally Davies	Beethoven	"Gott! Welch Dunkel hier!" (Fidelio, Act 2)	
18 Aug 2013	Sally Davies	Mozart	"A Man in search of Truth and Beauty" (The Magic Flute)	
18 Aug 2013	Sally Davies	Wagner	"So sterben wir" (Tristan und Isolde, Act 2)	
18 Aug 2013	Sally Davies	Brahms	Sextet No. 1 in B♭ (1st movement: Allegro ma non troppo)	
18 Aug 2013	Sally Davies	Freddie Mercury	"Bohemian Rhapsody"	
18 Aug 2013	Sally Davies	Ralph Vaughan Williams	Suite for Viola and Small Orchestra (Prelude)	
15 Sep 2013	Philip French	Felix Mendelssohn	Symphony No. 4 in A (Italian) (1st movement)	
15 Sep 2013	Philip French	Ray Henderson	"Button Up Your Overcoat"	
15 Sep 2013	Philip French	Beethoven	String Quartet in C♯ minor, Op. 131 (6th movement: Adagio quasi un poco andante)	
15 Sep 2013	Philip French	Grieg	"In the Hall of the Mountain King" (Peer Gynt)	
15 Sep 2013	Philip French	Miles Davis	Generique (Ascenseur pour l'echafaud)	
15 Sep 2013	Philip French	Leonard Bernstein	Symphonic Suite: On the Waterfront (excerpt)	
15 Sep 2013	Philip French	Wagner	"Ride of the Valkyries" (Die Walkure)	
15 Sep 2013	Philip French	Stravinsky	The Rite of Spring (Introduction)	
15 Sep 2013	Philip French	Harry Partch	Ulysses at the Edge (excerpt)	
29 Sep 2013	Beeban Kidron	Mieczyslaw Weinberg	Martha's Aria (The Passenger)	
29 Sep 2013	Beeban Kidron	Wagner	"Liebestod" (Tristan und Isolde)	
29 Sep 2013	Beeban Kidron	John Williams	Jaws (Main Title and First Victim)	
29 Sep 2013	Beeban Kidron	Rachel Portman	Oranges are not the Only Fruit (Main title)	
29 Sep 2013	Beeban Kidron	John Barry	"Sea of Death" (Swept from the Sea)	
29 Sep 2013	Beeban Kidron	Jay Gorney	"Brother, Can You Spare a Dime?"	
29 Sep 2013	Beeban Kidron	Bach	Toccata in E minor, BWV 914	
13 Oct 2013	Rory Kinnear	Traditional music	Big Rock Candy Mountain	
13 Oct 2013	Rory Kinnear	Haydn	Trumpet Concerto in E♭, Hob Vlle/1 (Andante)	
13 Oct 2013	Rory Kinnear	Beethoven	Violin Sonata No. 10 in G, Op. 96 (Adagio Espressivo)	
13 Oct 2013	Rory Kinnear	Cole Porter	"It's All Right With Me"	
13 Oct 2013	Rory Kinnear	Béla Bartók	Piano Concerto No. 3, Sz 119 BB127 (Adagio Religioso)	
13 Oct 2013	Rory Kinnear	Alfred Schnittke	Choir Concerto (4th movement)	
13 Oct 2013	Rory Kinnear	Bach	"Was willst du dich" (Cantata BMV 8; Liebster Gott, wenn werd ich sterben?)	
27 Oct 2013	Chris Mullin	Traditional music	"Ly con sao"	
27 Oct 2013	Chris Mullin	Kathryn Tickell	"Our Kate/The Welcome Home"	
27 Oct 2013	Chris Mullin	Handel	Organ Concerto in B♭, Op.7 No.3	
27 Oct 2013	Chris Mullin	Mozart	Mass in C minor, K427 (Credo)	
27 Oct 2013	Chris Mullin	Traditional music	"Aya Ngena"	
27 Oct 2013	Chris Mullin	Traditional music	Padmakara (Selwa)	
27 Oct 2013	Chris Mullin	Chopin	Nocturne in B♭ minor, Op.9 No.1	
27 Oct 2013	Chris Mullin	Mozart	Mass in C, K.317 (extract)	
27 Oct 2013	Chris Mullin	The Rolling Stones	"You Can't Always Get What You Want"	
3 Nov 2013	Roddy Doyle	Giovanni Battista Pergolesi	Quae Moerebat (Stabat Mater)	
3 Nov 2013	Roddy Doyle	George Formby	"Leaning On A Lamp Post"	
3 Nov 2013	Roddy Doyle	Brian Eno	An Ending – Ascent (Apollo: Atmospheres and Soundtracks)	
3 Nov 2013	Roddy Doyle	Michael Nyman	After Extra Time (Part 1)	
3 Nov 2013	Roddy Doyle	Mozart	Requiem in D minor, K.626 (excerpt)	
3 Nov 2013	Roddy Doyle	Harry Woods	"River Stay Away from my Door"	
3 Nov 2013	Roddy Doyle	Steve Reich	"After the War" (Different Trains)	
1 Dec 2013	Laura Mvula	Debussy	Cakewalk (Children's Corner)	
1 Dec 2013	Laura Mvula	Laura Mvula	"Make Me Lovely" (Sing to the Moon)	
1 Dec 2013	Laura Mvula	Elgar	Introduction and Allegro, Op. 47 (excerpt)	
1 Dec 2013	Laura Mvula	Joe Cutler	Music for Cello and Strings (Bartlebooth)	
1 Dec 2013	Laura Mvula	Eric Whitacre	"i thank you god for most this amazing day"	
1 Dec 2013	Laura Mvula	Michael Tippett	Concerto for Double String Orchestra (1st movement: Allegro con brio)	
1 Dec 2013	Laura Mvula	Nina Simone	"Four Women"	
1 Dec 2013	Laura Mvula	William Walton	"Jubilate Deo"	
1 Dec 2013	Laura Mvula	Miles Davis	"Flamenco Sketches"	
29 Dec 2013	Hugh Masekela	Bach	Contrapunctus IX (The Art of Fugue)	
29 Dec 2013	Hugh Masekela	Harold Arlen	"Ill Wind"	
29 Dec 2013	Hugh Masekela	Ralph Rainger	"Easy Living"	
29 Dec 2013	Hugh Masekela	Bill Carey	"You've Changed"	
29 Dec 2013	Hugh Masekela	Hugh Masekela	"Bring Him Back Home"	
29 Dec 2013	Hugh Masekela	Miles Davis	"All Blues" (Kind of Blue)	
29 Dec 2013	Hugh Masekela	Ravel	"Rigaudon" (Le Tombeau de Couperin)	
29 Dec 2013	Hugh Masekela	Hoagy Carmichael	"Rockin' Chair"	
