= Timeline of BBC Radio 3 =

A timeline of notable events relating to BBC Radio 3, a British national radio station which began broadcasting in September 1967.

== 1960s ==
- 1967
  - 30 September – BBC Radio 3 launches at 8am, replacing the BBC Third Programme.
- 1968
  - No events.
- 1969
  - No events.

== 1970s ==
- 1970
  - 28 March – Ahead of the transfer of sports coverage to Radio 2, Sports Service is aired for the final time.
  - 4 April – BBC Radio's sports coverage transfers from Radio 3 to Radio 2, although cricket commentary continues to be broadcast on Radio 3. Also transferring away from Radio 3 is other factual programming, moving mostly to Radio 4. Consequently, the station now focuses on classical music, the performing arts and adult education.
  - 8 April – Choral Evensong is broadcast on Radio 3 for the first time. It had previously been aired on Radio 4. Initially, it is only broadcast once a month but following the receipt of 2,500 letters of complaint, weekly transmissions resume on 1 July.
- 1971
  - 31 August – Pied Piper, a programme aimed at primary school children, is broadcast for the first time.
- 1972
  - 1 January – Stephen Hearst replaces Howard Newby as Controller.
  - 19 July – Homeward Bound, a new 20-minute teatime programme, is launched.
  - 21 July – The station extends its broadcasting hours by 25 minutes, closing down at midnight instead of 11:35pm.
  - 2 September – Radio 3 begins transmitting on one MW frequency – 647 kHz (464 metres).
- 1973
  - 1 January – Homeward Bound is doubled in length and now broadcasts in two 20-minute segments with a five-minute break for the teatime news bulletin.
- 1974
  - From that year, cricket commentary is broadcast only on MW, thereby allowing Radio 3's usual music schedule to continue on VHF.
- 1975
  - 29 September – Radio 3's weeknight teatime adult education slot Study on 3 is renamed Lifelines.
- 1976
  - 21 May – The final edition of Pied Piper is broadcast due to the death of the programme's presenter David Munrow.
- 1977
  - No events.
- 1978
  - 29 September – Adult education slot Lifelines is broadcast for the final time, bringing to an end of Radio 3's non-Open University adult educational output.
  - 2 October – For the first time, Radio 3 broadcasts a music programme on weeknights at 6:30pm when it launches At Home. However, the programme is only broadcast on MW as the station continues to broadcast Open University programmes on VHF.
  - 23 November – Radio 3 moves from 464m (647kHz) to 247m (1215kHz) medium wave as part of a plan to improve national AM reception and to conform with the Geneva Frequency Plan of 1975.
  - 22 December – Industrial action at the BBC by the ABS union which started the previous day, extends to radio when the radio unions join their television counterparts by going on strike, forcing the BBC to merge its four national radio networks into one national radio station from 4pm and called it the BBC All Network Radio Service. The strike is settled shortly before 10pm on Friday 22 December 1978 with the unions and BBC management reaching an agreement at the British government's industrial disputes arbitration service ACAS.
- 1979
  - Ian McIntyre replaces Stephen Hearst as Controller.

== 1980s ==
- 1980
  - 2 January – Radio 3 launches a new, extended teatime programme Mainly for Pleasure. The two-hour long programme replaces the much shorter Homeward Bound.
  - 3 May – Financial cutbacks at Radio 3 result in the station closing down 45 minutes earlier, at 11:15pm instead of midnight.
  - 15 October – Open University programmes are broadcast on weekday teatimes for the final time. Consequently, from the following day, Mainly for Pleasure and the full Radio 3 schedule, is heard on VHF all the year round for the first time.
- 1981
  - February – The new Open University year sees their transmissions on Radio 3 moved to late at night and early in the morning and are broadcast prior to and after the end of the stations' daily output. The programmes continue to be broadcast only on VHF.
  - 24 September – John Lade presents Record Review for the final time. His last broadcast is the programme's 1,000th edition. Paul Vaughan takes over the following week.
- 1982
  - No events.
- 1983
  - No events.
- 1984
  - 13 October – Radio 3's broadcast hours are extended. The station regains the 45 minutes of late night broadcasting time that it lost in 1980, closing down at midnight instead of just after 11:15pm and weekend broadcasts begin an hour earlier, at 6:55am rather than 7:55am. Consequently, the station is now on air from 6:55am until midnight seven days a week.
- 1985
  - No events.
- 1986
  - No events.
- 1987
  - John Drummond replaces Ian McIntyre as Controller.
  - 9 February – The 9am and 5pm news bulletins are replaced by a ten-minute bulletin from the BBC World Service. The bulletins are titled World Service News.
- 1988
  - 15 January – The final World Service News bulletins are broadcast.
  - 16 January
    - Record Review is relaunched as Saturday Review. Instead of a one-hour programme, which now incorporates Record Review, it is now broadcast throughout the morning, running between 9:30am and 1pm.
    - The weekend morning news bulletins are rescheduled and instead of three on the air bulletins, the station now broadcasts two bulletins, at 7:30am and 8:30am.
    - A new 15-minute preview programme, The Week on 3, is broadcast for the first time.
  - 18 January – This Week's Composer is renamed Composer of the Week.
- 1989
  - No events.

== 1990s ==
- 1990
  - 24 September – Radio 3's Night School opens. It airs repeats of the schools programmes broadcast the previous morning on BBC Radio 5. This allows schools to record an FM-quality transmission of the programmes which, following their transfer from Radio 4 to Radio 5, results in the morning broadcast now being heard on the inferior MW waveband. Night School is broadcast on FM only.
  - 1 October
    - Radio 3 stays on air for an extra 30 minutes on weeknights, ending broadcasting at 12:35am. The station continues to close at midnight at the weekend.
    - Experimental music programme Mixing It is launched, initially broadcasting once a fortnight.
- 1991
  - No events.
- 1992
  - February – Nicholas Kenyon replaces John Drummond as Controller.
  - 29 February – Radio 3 stops broadcasting on MW. Its frequency is to be used by a new national commercial station.
  - 20 May – Ball-by-ball cricket commentary moves to Radio 3's FM frequencies following the switching-off of the station's MW frequency.
  - 13 July – In a bid to counteract the forthcoming launch of Classic FM, Radio 3 makes major changes to its programmes, including the launch of new weekday breakfast and drivetime programmes. On Air replaces Morning Concert on weekdays and In Tune replaces Mainly for Pleasure.
  - 19 July – A three-hour Sunday morning show of popular classics, Brian Kay's Sunday Morning launches.
- 1993
  - Verity Sharp joins.
  - May – The broadcasting arrangements for Test Match Special are changed for the 1993 cricket season. The morning play is on BBC Radio 5, switching to BBC Radio 3 for the afternoon session.
  - 23 August – Cricket is broadcast on Radio 3 for the final time.
  - 26 September – Radio 3 launches a new Sunday breakfast programme Sacred and Profane, presented by Penny Gore.
- 1994
  - 19 September – BBC School Radio moves to Radio 3 and is transmitted for one hour at 2pm.
- 1995
  - 15 April – Weekly discussion programme Private Passions is broadcast for the first time.
  - 27 September – Radio 3 begins to broadcast digitally following the commencement by the BBC of regular Digital Audio Broadcasting, from the Crystal Palace transmitting station.
  - 9 October
    - Radio 3 begins broadcasting an hour earlier on weekdays at 6am, when breakfast show On Air is extended from two to three hours.
    - Paul Gambaccini joins to present a new morning programme called Morning Collection. Consequently, This Week's Composer moves to the later time of 12pm.
- 1996
  - 4 May – Radio 3 commences 24-hour transmissions.
  - 14 June – Schools programmes are broadcast during the day for the final time although they continue to be broadcast overnight until 2003.
  - 27 September – Paul Gambaccini leaves. He is replaced as presenter of Morning Collection by Catriona Young.
  - 29 September – Open University programmes are broadcast on Radio 3 for the final time.
- 1997
  - 31 August – Regular programming on the BBC's radio and television stations is abandoned to provide ongoing news coverage of the death of Diana, Princess of Wales and BBC Radio 3 simulcasts a special programme from BBC Radio News which is also carried on BBC Radio 1, BBC Radio 2, BBC Radio 4, and BBC Radio 5 Live. BBC Radio 3 broadcasts live coverage of the funeral six days later.
- 1998
  - Roger Wright replaces Nicholas Kenyon as station Controller.
  - 29 March – Sunday breakfast programme Sacred and Profane is broadcast for the final time.
  - 4 April – Breakfast programme On Air extends to weekends.
  - 12 September – Record Review is renamed CD Review.
- 1999
  - Donald Macleod becomes the regular presenter of Composer of the Week.
  - 11 September – Breakfast programme On Air is renamed Morning on 3.
  - 13 September – Experimental music programme Late Junction is broadcast for the first time.

== 2000s ==
- 2000
  - July – Radio 3 hires Andy Kershaw to host a world music programme, as Andy himself joins the station. two months after BBC Radio 1 axed his world music show.
  - Rob Cowan joins.
- 2001
  - Radio 3, along with other BBC Radio stations, stop broadcasting via Sky's analogue satellite service.
- 2002
  - No events.
- 2003
  - No events.
- 2004
  - No events.
- 2005
  - 5–10 June – Radio 3 clears its airwaves for almost an entire week to broadcast the music of a single composer – Ludwig van Beethoven. This is followed up at the end of the year with ten days of non-stop Johann Sebastian Bach which is broadcast in the run-up to Christmas.
- 2006
  - 8 January – Aled Jones joins.
  - July – Brian Kay leaves.
  - Radio 3 launches an annual Free Thinking Festival. Its aim is to create a platform for innovative thinking and debate on ideas relevant to contemporary society.
- 2007
  - 9 February – Mixing It is broadcast on Radio 3 for the final time. It is revived later in 2007 by community station Resonance FM.
  - 17 February – Radio 3 makes major changes to its schedule. These include Rob Cowan replacing Penny Gore as breakfast presenter and an extended weekday afternoon show which will run from 2 pm until the start of In Tune at 5 pm. The programmes previously broadcast at 4 pm are axed with one of those – Choral Evensong – moving to Sunday afternoons. The changes also see a reduction in the number of live concerts with live broadcasts replaced by pre-recorded concerts.
  - 17 September – BBC Radio 3's breakfast programme is renamed from Mornings on 3 to Breakfast.
- 2008
  - September – Following protests, the live broadcast of Choral Evensong returns to Wednesdays with a recorded repeat broadcast at the same time of day – 4 pm – on Sundays.
- 2009
  - No events.

== 2010s ==
- 2010
  - No events.
- 2011
  - 3 May – Radio 3 resumes the broadcasting of regular live concerts. This overturns the much criticised 2007 decision to replace almost all of its live broadcasts with pre-recorded concerts.
- 2012
  - 16 May – Spending cuts approved by the BBC Trust will see Radio 3 have "25 per cent fewer live and specially recorded lunchtime concerts".
- 2013
  - 27 January – Aled Jones hosts The Choir for the final time and leaves the station to rejoin Classic FM and BBC Radio Wales.
  - 28 September – Radio 3 announces a raft of new weekend programmes. They include a new concert series Live in Concert, a new film music programme called Sound of Cinema, a chance to hear highlights of the weekday lunchtime concerts, consistent times for the station's jazz programming and a new Monday night slot for Opera on 3.
  - 15 November – Sara Mohr-Pietsch presents Radio 3 Breakfast for the final time. She leaves the show to become presenter of Radio 3's Wigmore Hall lunchtime concerts and to present Sunday afternoon programme The Choir, replacing Aled Jones. She is replaced on 2 December by weekend breakfast presenter Clemency Burton-Hill.
- 2014
  - 7 January – Arts discussion programme Night Waves is relaunched as Free Thinking.
- 2015
  - January – Alan Davey replaces Roger Wright as Controller.
  - 5 April – Controller Alan Davey announces plans to revive Pied Piper, the 1970s series that introduced young listeners to classical music.
  - 12–15 November – Radio 3 joins with commercial station Jazz FM to operate a four-day pop-up station called BBC Music Jazz. The station returned a year later, running from Thursday 10 November 2016 at 10 am until Monday 14 November at 10 am.
- 2016
  - 2 January – After 17 years as CD Review, the programme reverts to its original name of Record Review.
- 2017
  - 2 October – Katie Derham joins the In Tune presenting team to replace Suzy Klein who moves to morning programme Essential Classics.
- 2018
  - January – Rob Cowan leaves the station to rejoin Classic FM after 17 years of broadcasting at the station. He is replaced as presenter of Essential Classics by Ian Skelly.
  - 24 March – Controller Alan Davey announces a raft of new programmes, including a new world music show called Music Planet which will replace World on 3 and a new weeknight late show called After Dark.
  - 24 October – FM coverage in Wales is reduced when Radio 3's frequency at more than 30 relay transmitters is reallocated to BBC Radio Wales.
- 2019
  - Autumn – Late Junction's airtime is more than halved, from three 90-minute episodes a week to a single two-hour slot on Fridays.

== 2020s ==
- 2020
  - No events.
- 2021
  - 5 April
    - Georgia Mann becomes a presenter of Essential Classics.
    - BBC Radio 3 begins a week of programmes celebrating the life and work of Igor Stravinsky to mark the 50th anniversary of his death.
  - 9–11 April – Following the death of Prince Philip, Duke of Edinburgh, BBC Radio 3 abandons half its weekend scheduled programming in favour of simulcasting the BBC Radio News special programme and from 5:10pm the station broadcasts a revised schedule for the rest of the day and over the weekend.
  - 12 April – Ian Skelly joins the Afternoon Concert presenting team.
- 2022
  - 8–11 September & 19 September – Following the death of Queen Elizabeth II, BBC Radio 3 abandons its regular scheduled programming in favour of simulcasting the BBC Radio News special programme, and from Friday to Sunday as well as 19 September the station broadcasts a revised schedule for the end of the week and over 19 September on the day of the funeral.
- 2023
  - March – Sam Jackson replaces Alan Davey as Controller of BBC Radio 3.
- 2024
  - 7 February – The BBC announces plans to launch a new Radio 3 spin-off station on DAB and online via BBC Sounds. The station will focus on calming classical music, aimed at helping listeners "unwind, de-stress and escape the pressures of daily life". It is later announced that the station will be called Radio 3 Unwind.
  - 1 April
    - Major changes take place to Radio 3's weekday schedule, including extended editions of Breakfast and Mornings. This Week's Composer moves to the later time of 4pm.
    - A new weeknight jazz programme launches on BBC Radio 3. Titled Round Midnight, the show is presented by saxophonist, composer and MC Soweto Kinch.
  - 5 April – Friday Night is Music Night returns when it makes its debut on Radio 3. The programme continues to act as a showcase for the BBC Concert Orchestra.
  - 4 November - BBC Radio 3 Unwind launches.
- 2025
  - 23 March – The final drama broadcast aires on BBC Radio 3, with all drama going forward aired only on BBC Radio 4.
  - 2 July – Ofcom gives final approval of the BBC's plans for three new DAB+ stations, one of which is Radio 3 Unwind. It will launch on DAB+ and online via BBC Sounds.
  - 11 September – Radio 3 Unwind launches on DAB+.
