= Six English Towns =

- Title screen, showing images of the six towns visited in the first series.
- Also known as: Six More English Towns; Another Six English Towns
- Presented by: Alec Clifton-Taylor
- Theme music composer: Thomas Arne, Jim Parker
- No. of seasons: 3
- No. of episodes: 18

Production
- Executive producer: Bruce Norman
- Producers: Denis Moriarty, Jane Coles

Original release
- Network: BBC2
- Release: 4 August 1978 – 14 October 1984

Six English Towns (1978), Six More English Towns (1981) and Another Six English Towns (1984) are three television documentary series presented by architectural historian Alec Clifton-Taylor for BBC Two. In the series, Clifton-Taylor visits an English town and discusses its history and architectural character, with a particular focus on the building materials.

A writer on architecture, Clifton-Taylor came to television late in life. He was introduced by his friend Nikolaus Pevsner to BBC arts producer John Drummond who was planning a series on British architecture called Spirit of the Age. Drummond asked Clifton-Taylor to present the first episode about medieval English architecture, which was broadcast in October 1975.

Based on the success of this episode, Clifton-Taylor was teamed with producer Denis Moriarty to present a series of studies of English towns, discussing the genius loci similar to his chapters in Pevsner's Buildings of England and the AA Touring Guide to England. The Radio Times stated that the initial six towns were chosen "based not so much on the historical appeal of a fine cathedral, a castle or a church but the range and quality of the ordinary domestic houses and the use made of the traditional building materials of England - stone, brick, wood and plaster." Clifton-Taylor said "I'd like every programme to be an exercise in looking."

== Episodes ==
Three series were made in total; series 1 episodes were 30 minute in duration, series 2 episodes were extended to 40 minutes, but returned to 30 for series 3.

Series 1 and 2 feature the final movement of Thomas Arne's Symphony No. 2 in F major as their title music (which Clifton-Taylor later chose as one of his Desert Island Discs), series 3 has an original score composed by Jim Parker.

=== Series 1 - Six English Towns ===
Episode No.	Subject	UK Broadcast Date
1	Chichester, West Sussex	4 August 1978
2	Richmond, North Yorkshire	11 August 1978
3	Tewkesbury, Gloucestershire	18 August 1978
4	Stamford, Lincolnshire	25 August 1978
5	Totnes, Devon	1 September 1978
6	Ludlow, Shropshire	8 September 1978

=== Series 2 - Six More English Towns ===
Episode No.	Subject	UK Broadcast Date
1	Warwick, Warwickshire	15 September 1981
2	Berwick-upon-Tweed, Northumberland	22 September 1981
3	Saffron Walden, Essex	29 September 1981
4	Lewes, East Sussex	6 October 1981
5	Bradford on Avon, Wiltshire	13 October 1981
6	Beverley, East Riding of Yorkshire	20 October 1981

=== Series 3 - Another Six English Towns ===
Episode No.	Subject	UK Broadcast Date
1	Cirencester, Gloucestershire	9 September 1984
2	Whitby, North Yorkshire	16 September 1984
3	Bury St Edmunds, Suffolk	23 September 1984
4	Devizes, Wiltshire	30 September 1984
5	Sandwich, Kent	7 October 1984
6	Durham, County Durham	14 October 1984

== Reviews ==
Architectural writer Jonathan Glancey cites them as a formative influence for his passion for architecture: "It wouldn't work today. A lovely old duffer in a Viyella shirt, tweed jacket and wobbly hat pottering about six small English towns with a camera crew in tow and speaking quietly of their simple virtues...I still think these programmes are some of the best made on architecture, buildings and places, because I learned so much from them, liked their lack of pretension, their quiet passion and Clifton-Taylor's great ability as a communicator."

== Media releases ==
Each series was accompanied by its own book, and DVDs of the three series were released in 2016 and 2017. A box set of the three series was released 5 November 2018, entitled Six English Towns The Complete Collection and includes a discussion between John Julius Norwich and Alec Clifton-Taylor called In Search of the Spirit of the age shown before the BBC2 repeat of the series Spirit of the Age in May 1976. Producer Denis Moriarty provided a new commentary on the episodes about Chichester, Saffron Walden and Cirencester.
