= Kate Molleson =

Scottish radio presenter and music journalist

Kate Molleson is a Scottish radio presenter and music journalist. She presents on BBC Radio 3.

== Education ==
Molleson grew up in various areas of Scotland, as well as in Canada's far north. She was interested in classical music as a child. She studied musicology at King's College London and clarinet performance at McGill University in Canada.

== Career ==
Molleson worked in several different roles for the Montreal Gazette up to 2010 at the latest, and was the deputy editor of Opera magazine, before returning to Scotland. She then began reviewing classical music for The Guardian in 2010.

Molleson presented BBC Radio 3 concerts from 2015 onwards and first presented Breakfast on BBC Radio 3 in May 2021. Molleson has presented documentaries for BBC Radio 4 and the BBC World Service. In 2022, Molleson remained a commentator upon classical music and an observer of the broader classical music scene. In 2023, she began presenting some editions of Composer of the Week on BBC Radio 3, with Donald Macleod presenting the other editions of the programme. Molleson also presents Music Matters on BBC Radio 3. In 2025, a 40-episode series about radical or slightly radical composers from the 20th century, presented by Molleson and Gillian Moore, began to be broadcast on Radio 3. Molleson has also presented Afternoon Concert and Hear and Now on BBC Radio 3.

In 2022, Molleson's book Sound Within Sound was published; it explores the stories of composers who defied and pushed against conventions in the 20th century. The book is a collection of essays.

== Personal life ==
Molleson lives in Edinburgh.

== Other activities ==
Molleson sits on the board of directors of the Dunedin Consort, a UK-based baroque ensemble.

== Publications ==
- Sound Within Sound: Opening Our Ears to the Twentieth Century ISBN 978-0-7710-5166-1
