= Alan Davey =

Alan or Allen Davey may refer to:

- Alan Davey (civil servant), chief executive of the Arts Council England
- Alan Davey (musician) (born 1963), former bassist with Hawkwind
- Allen M. Davey, Academy Award-winning cinematographer
