= Robert Furneaux Jordan =

John Robert Furneaux Jordan ARIBA (10 April 1905 Birmingham – 14 May 1978 Burcombe, Wiltshire) was an English architect, architectural critic and novelist. He worked as an architect from 1928 to 1961, after which he became an academic, broadcaster and lecturer, writing many books on architecture.

A son of the prominent surgeon John Furneaux Jordan, Robert Jordan was educated at West House Preparatory School from 1915 to 1918 and then King Edward's School, Birmingham from 1918 to 1922. He studied at the Birmingham School of Art for three years before going to the Architectural Association School in 1926. He received his diploma from there in 1928.

Other positions occupied were:

- 1934–63 Lecturer, Architectural Association School
- 1948–51 Principal, Architectural Association School
- 1951–61 Architectural Correspondent, The Observer, London
- 1960–61 Hoffman Wood Professor of Architecture, University of Leeds
- 1962 Visiting Professor, Syracuse University, New York

Before moving to Wiltshire, he lived mainly in London. He died from Motor Neurone disease.

During the Second World War he was secretary of the Cambridge Peace Aims Group.

He wrote five crime novels under the name of Robert Player (using his mother's maiden name), mostly set in the Victorian and Edwardian periods and published from 1945 until the late 1970s. They contain a strong element of social satire, concerning the hypocrisy and corruptions of those periods.

== Family ==
His father (John Furneaux Jordan, 1865–1956), grandfather (Thomas Furneaux Jordan) and great-grandfather were surgeons, as were an uncle, great uncle and cousin.

His parents married in 1898; his mother Mildred (née Player) was the daughter of John Player of Edgbaston. She survived her husband.

His brother was the journalist and prime ministerial press officer, Philip Jordan (1902–1951).

Robert Jordan married Eira Furneaux Jordan in 1966.

== Works ==
=== Works on architecture ===
- The English Home (1959)
- European Architecture in Colour: from the Greeks to the Nineteenth Century (1961)
- Victorian Architecture (1966)
- Le Corbusier (1972)
- Concise History of Western Architecture (1984)

=== Television documentaries ===
- The Rape of Utopia: the Disenchanted City (BBC, 1964)
- Spirit of the Age - Eight Centuries of British Architecture (with Alec Clifton-Taylor, John Julius Norwich, Roy Strong, John Summerson, Mark Girouard, Patrick Nuttgens, Hugh Casson) (1976)

=== Detective novels ===
- The Ingenious Mr Stone (1945): a detective story about the poisoning of the ultra-High Church headmistress of a girls' school in Devonshire
- Let's Talk of Graves, of Worms, of Epitaphs (1975): ISBN 0-575-01922-0. A fictional account of an Anglican clergyman who becomes Pope, loosely based on Lytton Strachey's life of Cardinal Manning
- Oh, Where are Bloody Mary's Earrings? (1972): concerns a pair of earrings given as a wedding present by Philip II of Spain to Mary I of England, and the times they were stolen or copied between then and the Edwardian period
- The Homicidal Colonel (1970): concerns a psychopathic colonel from the American Deep South who reinvents himself as an English country squire and later disappears back to America, there committing a series of sex murders.
- The Month of the Mangled Models (1977): a series of murders set at the time of the Pre-Raphaelite and Arts and Crafts movements
