= Private Passions =

BBC music discussion programme (1995–now)

- Genre: music discussion
- Running time: 1.5 hour (12:00 pm – 1:30 pm)
- Country of origin: United Kingdom
- Language: English
- Home station: BBC Radio 3
- Hosted by: Michael Berkeley
- Written by: Ian McEwan
- Produced by: Clare Walker, Graham Rogers
- Recording studio: BBC (2023 –present)
- Original release: April 15, 1995
- No. of episodes: 1995–1999, 2000–2004, 2005–2009, 2010–2014, 2015–2019, 2020–present

Private Passions is a weekly music discussion programme that has been running since 15 April 1995 on BBC Radio 3, presented by composer Michael Berkeley. The production was formerly made by Classic Arts Productions, a British radio and audio production company that provided programmes to the BBC until June 2013. Between June 2013 to April 2023, the programme was produced by Loftus Audio and producers Elizabeth Burke, Jane Greenwood and Olivia Seligman. Since April 2023, it has been made by the BBC and the producers are Clare Walker and Graham Rogers.

The hour-and-a-half show is broadcast almost every Sunday at 12:00 in the UK, and is available on demand through the BBC website, where it is possible to listen to the last seven days of Radio 3 broadcasts. Every week, Berkeley interviews a notable guest about their life and musical interests and plays a selection of their favourite pieces. The emphasis is on classical music, but also embraces jazz, world music and popular song. The "life and works" aspect of the interview is generally secondary to the discussion about musical passions, and Berkeley often aims to explore a guest's unexpected musical interests.

There are programmes that are compilations covering a particular topic or a fictitious guest. Writer Ian McEwan has described it as "musically and psychologically irresistible. Probably the best programme on radio in Britain." The Private Passions book charts the show's first decade, listing all the guests and their choices of music. The programme's theme tune is Berkeley's own "The Wakeful Poet" (from Music from Chaucer) performed by the Beaux-Arts Brass Quintet.

On 15 April 2025, Petroc Trelawny presented a special edition of BBC Radio 3's In Tune, interviewing Berkeley, and playing excerpts from notable participants, to celebrate the programme's 30th anniversary.

== Episodes ==
- List of Private Passions episodes (1995–1999)
- List of Private Passions episodes (2000–2004)
- List of Private Passions episodes (2005–2009)
- List of Private Passions episodes (2010–2014)
- List of Private Passions episodes (2015–2019)
- List of Private Passions episodes (2020–present)
