= Spirit of the Age (TV series) =

- Theme music composer: Sir Arthur Bliss
- Country of origin: United Kingdom
- No. of episodes: 8

Production
- Executive producer: John Drummond
- Running time: 50 min

Original release
- Network: BBC 2
- Release: 31 October – 19 December 1975

Spirit of the Age is a 1975 documentary series of "Eight films on eight centuries of British Architecture". It was broadcast on BBC 2 between 31 October 1975 and 19 December 1975 as the BBC's contribution to the Council of Europe's European Architectural Heritage Year.

Each episode examined a different era of British architecture was presented by an expert in his field. It was series produced by the arts specialist John Drummond. Its title music was a specially-composed fanfare by the Master of the Queen's Music, Sir Arthur Bliss.

A book of the same name was published to accompany the television series by BBC Books in 1975, later reprinted in 1992. The series was repeated in May 1976, when a studio discussion "In Search of the Spirit of the Age" featuring Alec Clifton-Taylor and John Julius Norwich was broadcast to introduce the series. The first episode, presented by Alec Clifton-Taylor, was his first television presenting experience, but led to Six English Towns which ran for three series from 1978.

== List of episodes ==
Episode No.	Episode Title	UK Broadcast Date	Description
1	"The Medieval World"	31 October 1975	Alec Clifton-Taylor surveys the surviving medieval buildings of England, from timber-framed cottages, parish churches and moated farms to the great castles and cathedrals, with a special focus on Lincoln Cathedral, which he considered the finest.
2	"A New Heaven, a New Earth"	7 November 1975	Roy Strong explores how new palaces built following the English Reformation gave English vernacular architecture a strong influence from the Italian Renaissance.
3	"The Cult of Grandeur"	14 November 1975	Robert Furneaux Jordan examines how three of England's most famous architects - Sir Christopher Wren, Sir John Vanbrugh and Nicholas Hawksmoor - brought about their English Baroque masterpieces after the Restoration of Charles II.
4	"A Sense of Proportion"	21 November 1975	John Julius Norwich considers the restraint and proportion of Palladian architecture of the 18th century.
5	"Landscape with Buildings"	28 November 1975	Sir John Summerson looks at the architectural era of the Adam brothers and John Nash, and how new ideas of the Romantic poets and painters saw a new relationship between landscapes and buildings.
6	"All That Money Could Buy"	5 December 1975	Mark Girouard examines how the prosperity of the Industrial Revolution and advent of the railways brought the Victorians an exuberance of both materials and style, with a special focus on Sir George Gilbert Scott's Gothic Revival masterpiece, the Midland Grand Hotel at St Pancras railway station.
7	"A Full Life and an Honest Place"	12 December 1975	Patrick Nuttgens investigates how William Morris and the Arts and Crafts movement brought about societal change with the Garden city movement and a renewed focus on craftsmanship in buildings such as Charles Rennie Mackintosh's Glasgow School of Art.
8	"Dreams and Awakenings"	19 December 1975	Sir Hugh Casson reviews 20th-century architecture, from 1920s social experiments through to the Brutalist works of the 1960s.
