= Scott Yanow =

American jazz writer

- Born: New York City, U.S.
- Occupations: Writer; music critic
- Website: www.scottyanow.com

Scott Yanow is an American jazz reviewer, historian, and author.

== Life and career ==
Yanow was born in New York City and grew up near Los Angeles.

Beginning in 1974, Yanow was a regular reviewer of many jazz styles and was the jazz editor for Record Review. In September 2002, Yanow was interviewed on-camera by CNN about the Monterey Jazz Festival and wrote an in-depth biography on Dizzy Gillespie for AllMusic. He authored 12 books on jazz (including 2022's Life Through the Eyes of a Jazz Journalist), more than 900 liner notes for CDs, and more than 20,000 reviews of jazz recordings.

Yanow contributed to the third edition of the All Music Guide to Jazz, serving as co-editor. He has written for DownBeat, Jazziz, the Los Angeles Jazz Scene, Syncopated Times, Jazz Artistry Now, the Jazz Rag, and The New York City Jazz Record.

Yanow has produced a number of records under the Allegro record label. He also hosted a regular radio show called Jazz After Hours, which was broadcast on KCSB-FM. He has also served as a jazz listings editor for the Los Angeles Times.

== Bibliography ==
Books

- Duke Ellington (November 1999), ISBN 1-56799-855-0
- Swing (April 2000), ISBN 978-0-87930-600-7
- Bebop (August 2000), ISBN 978-0-87930-608-3
- Afro-Cuban Jazz (December 2000), ISBN 978-0-87930-619-9
- Trumpet Kings: The Players Who Shaped the Sound of Jazz Trumpet (August 2001), ISBN 978-0-87930-640-3
- Classic Jazz (December 2001), ISBN 978-0-87930-659-5
- Jazz on Film, The Complete History of the Musicians and Music Onscreen (October 2004), ISBN 978-0-87930-783-7
- Jazz on Record – The First Sixty Years (October 2003), ISBN 978-0-87930-755-4
- Jazz: A Regional Exploration (February 28, 2005), ISBN 978-0-31332-871-8
- The Jazz Singers: The Ultimate Guide (September 2008), ISBN 978-0-87930-825-4
- The Great Jazz Guitarists: The Ultimate Guide (April 2013), ISBN 978-1-61713-023-6
- Life Through The Eyes Of A Jazz Journalist – My Music Memoirs (April 2022), ISBN 978-1-95832-402-8
