= Analysis (radio programme) =

- Running time: 30 mins (Monday)
- Country of origin: UK
- Language: English
- Home station: BBC Radio 4
- Created by: George Fischer
- Original release: 10 April 1970
- Website: Website
- Podcast: Podcasts

Analysis is a BBC Radio 4 current affairs programme which has been running for more than 50 years, and is currently broadcast in a half-hour format.

== History ==
It began in April 1970. The first presenter was Ian McIntyre, who later became Controller of Radio 4 from 1976 to 1978 and of Radio 3 from 1978 to 1987; he left the programme in 1976.

Mark Laity was a senior producer from 1986 to 1988. Caroline Thomson (Chief Operating officer of the BBC since 2007) produced during 1978–81.

== Content ==
Its aim is to examine "the ideas and forces which shape public policy in Britain and abroad", and it covers various topics by means of interviews with academics and experts.

It takes an investigative journalism style and applies this to more global and strategic topics, at national and international levels.

== Awards ==
In 2000 Analysis won the Political Studies Association 50th Anniversary Award for Outstanding Broadcast Journalism. In the 1970s and 1980s it was regularly presented by and associated with award-winning journalist and commentator Mary Goldring.

== Presenters ==
- Ian McIntyre 1970–76
- Gerald Priestland 1974–75
- Mary Goldring 1977–87
- Peter Hennessy 1986–92
- Andrew Dilnot 1994–
- Robert Tyrrell 1997–
- Peter Kellner 1995–98
- Frances Cairncross
- Ben Hammersley
- Kenan Malik
- Sonia Sodha
- Chris Bowlby
