= Donald Macleod (radio presenter) =

Scottish radio presenter

- Born: April 20, 1953 (age 73)
- Education: University of St Andrews
- Occupations: Radio presenter, journalist
- Known for: Composer of the Week on BBC Radio 3

Donald Macleod (born 20 April 1953) is a Scottish radio presenter. He presents Composer of the Week on BBC Radio 3.

== Education ==
Macleod comes from Kirkintilloch. He went to school in Glasgow and studied psychology at the University of St Andrews.

== Career ==
Macleod's first job, after finishing his university, was at the BBC Radio Drama department, where he was involved in the creation of sound effects.

His first presenting job was at BBC Radio 3. He then worked for the BBC television programme 60 Minutes as a newsreader and reporter.

In late 1987, Macleod was presenting Midweek Choice on BBC Radio 3. In 1990 he was presenting various programmes for BBC Radio 3.

For four years prior to 1996, Macleod was in charge of presentation at BBC Radio 3. From May 1996 onwards, Macleod presented Through The Night on BBC Radio 3.

He joined Composer of the Week in 1999. Macleod was the sole presenter of the programme from 1999 until 2023, when Kate Molleson began to solo-present some editions of the programme (with Macleod solo-presenting the other editions). By 2023, Macleod had presented 950 series of the programme. Macleod's style of presentation for the programme includes him giving fact-based commentaries on the examined composer's life and musical work.
