= Alec Clifton-Taylor =

English architectural historian (1907–1985)

Alec Clifton-Taylor OBE (2 August 1907 – 1 April 1985) was an English architectural historian, writer and TV broadcaster.

== Biography and works ==
Born Alec Clifton Taylor (no hyphen), the son of Stanley Edgar Taylor, corn-merchant, and Ethel Elizabeth Taylor (née Hills), in 1907 at Whitepost House, Overton Road in Sutton, Surrey, Clifton Taylor was educated at Bishop's Stortford College and at the Queen's College, Oxford. He went on to the Courtauld Institute of Art. During World War II he served in the Admiralty.

His best-known and most influential book is The Pattern of English Building (1962) (ISBN 0-571-14890-5), an examination of the architectural vernacular. It orders its subject according to the building materials and methods used in England. Two of his other books are studies of ecclesiastical architecture: The Cathedrals of England and English Parish Churches as Works of Art. Along with Nikolaus Pevsner (to whose Buildings of England series he was a contributor) and John Betjeman, Clifton-Taylor is considered one of the three most significant figures in the study of English churches.

== Television work ==
Clifton Taylor gained his greatest public recognition late in life through his work for the BBC. After being introduced through Pevsner to BBC arts producer John Drummond, Clifton Taylor presented the first episode, The Medieval World, of a television programme on British architecture through the ages called The Spirit of the Age, broadcast in Autumn 1975.

Clifton Taylor went on to present three extremely popular series of 30- or 40-minute BBC programmes: Six English Towns (1978), Six More English Towns (1981), and Another Six English Towns (1984), in which he visited eighteen English towns, discussing their history and architectural character in an accessible and courteous (if uncompromising) style.

== Personal life ==
He lived in Kensington, west London, for much of his life (15 Clareville Grove) and was president of the Kensington Society, an organisation devoted to preserving the borough's architecture and open spaces. The Alec Clifton Taylor Memorial Garden is located behind St Mary Abbots Church in Kensington.

Clifton Taylor was awarded the title of Officer of the Order of the British Empire (OBE) in the 1982 Birthday Honours for "services to the study of architecture."
