= Mary Goldring =

British journalist and broadcaster

Mary Sheila Goldring OBE (born 1923 - died 2016) was a British business journalist and broadcaster.

An economist who graduated from Lady Margaret Hall, Oxford University, Goldring turned to journalism in the late 1940s and became a member of staff at The Economist, where for a long time she was its Business Editor, rising to the rank of Deputy Editor alongside Norman McRae. She left the paper suddenly in spring 1974 following a dispute over its editorship in the wake of the surprise departure of Alastair Burnet, who left to become editor of the Daily Express.

Goldring then moved to the BBC and meantime also wrote a weekly column for the Investors Chronicle, edited at the time by Andreas Whittam Smith. In 1976 she became one of the main regular presenters of BBC Radio 4's Analysis series of analytical authored current-affairs documentaries. She developed it into a flagship programme, staying with it until 1987. She also made five series of television documentaries, the Goldring Audit, for Channel 4 screened from 1993 to 1998.

In the late 1960s, Mary Goldring was The Economist's aviation correspondent, a post in which she was highly critical of the development programme for the Anglo-French Concorde supersonic aircraft, on the basis of noise, pollution and above all what she predicted would be disastrous commercial economics.

== Books ==
- Goldring, Mary Sheila (1957). Economics of Atomic Energy. London: Butterworths Scientific.
