= Paul Vaughan =

British journalist

Paul William Vaughan (24 October 1925 – 14 November 2014) was a British journalist, radio presenter (of art and science programmes) throughout the 1970s, 1980s and 1990s, and a narrator of many BBC Television science documentaries, among them Horizon. He was also a semi-professional jazz and classical musician.

== Early life ==
He was born in Brixton, South London, but after ten years moved to New Malden in Surrey. His father worked at the Linoleum (& Floorcloth) Manufacturers' Association (LMA), which became the British Floorcovering Manufacturers' Association. He was the younger brother of dance archivist and historian David Vaughan.

He attended Raynes Park County School (a boys' grammar school, which became Raynes Park High School in 1969), which he attended with other well-known voices on Radio 4, who also followed him to Oxford. He studied French and English at Wadham College, Oxford. He did military service in the Royal Electrical and Mechanical Engineers – REME.

== Early career ==
He began work for the pharmaceutical company Menley and James, now part of GlaxoSmithKline, in Camberwell.

From 1955 to 1965 he was the Chief Press Officer of the British Medical Association (BMA) at Tavistock Square.

== Broadcasting career ==
Throughout the 1970s, 1980s and early 1990s, Vaughan was the main voice of BBC TV's arts and science programmes. As well as working on television, he was also heard on similar radio programmes.

=== Science ===
From 1968 until 1995 Vaughan was the main narrator of the BBC's heavyweight science documentary series Horizon. Science and technology were rapidly developing in that period, notably in biology and electronics, and consequently there was much to report for the Horizon series.

On the BBC World Service Vaughan presented Science in Action, and Discovery, and on Radio 4 New Worlds (1969–1973).

=== Arts ===
Vaughan presented the Radio 4 magazine arts programme Kaleidoscope from its beginning in 1973 through to its closure in April 1998. Kaleidoscope initially had science also in its remit, and later in October 1995 Vaughan's input into the programme was limited to reviewing books and music, to introduce some structure to the programme's topics.

On Radio 3 he presented Record Review from 1981, taking over from John Lade, who had presented it from its beginning in 1957.

He also presented a programme similar to Kaleidoscope called World of Concorde for British Airways in-flight entertainment.

=== Other work ===
Vaughan narrated the 1984 television drama Threads.

When the phone network Orange was launched in Britain, for many years his voice, using the tagline "The future's bright, the future's Orange", was used exclusively for the television adverts. He was also one of the most widely heard voices for Tesco's "Every Little Helps" promotion and for Colgate toothpaste commercials.

== Musical career ==
Paul Vaughan was a self-taught Clarinetist in both jazz and classical music and played in the Worcester Park and Wimbledon Symphony Orchestras.

== Personal life ==
He married in north-east Surrey in 1951 to Barbara Prys-Jones, daughter of Welsh poet Arthur Prys-Jones; Vaughan and Prys-Jones had four children. After his divorce from Prys-Jones, Vaughan married BBC producer Philippa (Pippa) Burston in 1988, with whom he had two sons.

== Filmography ==
Year	Title	Role	Notes
1984	Threads	Narrator	Voice
1998	Waking Ned	Narrator	Voice
2008	The Escapist	Prison Tannoy Voice	Voice

== Publications ==
- Exciting Times in the Accounts Department, Sinclair-Stevenson, 1995. 256 pages, ISBN 1856195279
- Something in Linoleum: A Thirties Education, Sinclair-Stevenson, 1994. 224 pages, ISBN 1856194442
- The Pill on Trial, Weidenfeld & Nicolson, 1970. 272 pages, ISBN 029700185X
- Family Planning: The Family Planning Associations Guide to Birth Control, Queen Anne Publishers, 1969. 96 pages, ISBN 0362000441
- Work to be Done: Careers in Mental Health, National Association for Mental Health, 1966.
- Doctors' Commons: A Short History of the British Medical Association, Heinemann, 1959. (Paperback – Faber and Faber, 18 August 2011). 254 pages, ISBN 0571281613
