= Peace Aims Group =

Peace Aims Groups were groups active at the start of the Second World War that agitated for a negotiated peace with Germany. They were usually from the left of the spectrum.

These included:

- Parliamentary Peace Aims Group
- Cambridge Peace Aims Group
- Anglican Peace Aims and the Christendom Group
