= Stephen Hearst =

Stephen Hearst CBE (born Stephen Hirshtritt; 6 October 1919 – 27 March 2010) was an Austrian-born British television and radio executive.

== Early life and career ==
Born in Vienna, the son of a dentist who was close to the Mahler family, Hearst had begun to study medicine, but fleeing from the Nazis became imperative after the Anschluss in 1938 had driven him underground because of his Jewish background and anti-fascist activities. The family settled in Britain, and after a brief period studying horticulture and being interned, Hearst served in the Pioneer Corps during the war. After demobilisation, he studied history at Brasenose College, Oxford.

After working freelance on newsreel scripts, Hearst joined the BBC's staff in 1952, and moving over to documentaries where he continued writing their narration. After two years writing for programmes involving Richard Dimbleby, he was a writer-producer from 1955 to 1965, becoming executive producer of arts' programmes under Huw Wheldon, and then deputy to Humphrey Burton, the first head of BBC music and arts, in 1965.

Hearst was responsible for developing the 'personal view' documentary format with Sir Compton Mackenzie's The Glory That Was Greece (1959) and several projects with the archaeologist Sir Mortimer Wheeler, this time concerning Ancient Rome, around the same time. In 1967 he became head of television arts features and championed this approach leading to the 13 part series' Kenneth Clark's Civilisation (1969) and Alistair Cooke's America (1972). By the time the latter programme was finally transmitted, Hearst had moved on to the next stage of his BBC career.

== Later life and career ==
He became Controller of Radio 3 on 1 January 1972, and had explicitly stated at his interview the relevance of audience figures, a point which he thought had given him preferment over his main rival, Martin Esslin, another Viennese émigré. Hearst was viewed with suspicion as a 'television man' by his new colleagues, and according to producer Philip French had "a degree of contempt" for radio which was "never made absolutely explicit", but did nevertheless create "a relaxed atmosphere" at Radio 3.

Hearst clashed with music department colleagues who attempted to resist his toning down of an overtly academic approach to introducing classical music and he came up with the practice of 'themed' evenings or weekends, a policy which still continues, as well as giving titles to concerts. Simulcasts on radio and television began under Hearst, who was well aware of the poor sound quality television loudspeakers provided at the time.

He remained the controller of Radio 3 until 1978, and then joined the BBC's Future Policy Group. In 1982, he was appointed as the special advisor of the new Director General Alasdair Milne, although Hearst had retired from the post by the time Milne was forced to resign in early 1987. "Public service broadcasting is likely to go down as the greatest British cultural invention of the 20th century", Hearst once wrote. At the end of the 1970s, he became a visiting professor at the University of Edinburgh. Stephen Hearst died in London.
