= Composer of the Week =

British music radio programme

- Other names: This Week's Composer (1943–1988)
- Genre: Music, talk show
- Running time: 60 minutes
- Country of origin: United Kingdom
- Language: English
- Home station: BBC Home Service (1943–1964); BBC Third Programme (1964–1967); BBC Radio 3 (1967–present)
- Hosted by: Donald Macleod (1999–present); Kate Molleson (2023–present)
- Original release: 2 August 1943
- Audio format: Stereophonic sound
- Website: Official website

Composer of the Week is a biographical music programme produced by BBC Cymru Wales and broadcast on BBC Radio 3. It is broadcast daily from Monday to Friday at 16:00 for one hour, with each week's programmes being a self-contained series of five dedicated to a particular composer or a group of related composers.

With the "great composers", weeks dedicated to them tend to focus on a particular aspect of their life or works.

== History ==
Originally titled This Week's Composer, the series was first broadcast on 2 August 1943 on the BBC Home Service, running from 07:30 to 07:55, Monday to Saturday. There were some breaks in the schedule: for instance, Music Diary was used as a replacement from January to March 1945. The programme originally had no permanent presenter and was instead presented live by the day's duty continuity announcer. As a consequence, there are no recordings of the programme in the BBC archives from before the 1980s.

In December 1964 it was transferred to the BBC Third Programme, beginning at 09:04 on weekdays. The title was quietly changed to Composer of the Week on 18 January 1988. From 9 October 1995 Composer of the Week was moved from its long-standing 09:00 slot to 12:00 to make way for a new morning schedule at Radio 3.

The series has been written and presented by Donald Macleod since 1999. Sometimes recordings are made on location with Macleod visiting composers at home – such as the Harrison Birtwistle episodes in October 2019.

Since May 2023, some weeks have been presented by Kate Molleson. Molleson's first week was about György Ligeti. A schedule refresh in April 2024 moved the programme from 12:00 to 16:00.

== Notable episodes ==
- The first composer chosen, on 2 August 1943, was Mozart, followed over the next four weeks by Beethoven, Schubert, Bach and Haydn.
- Vaughan Williams was the first living composer to be featured, on 7 February 1944.
- The first group composer episodes were "The Elizabethans" from 14 February 1944, followed by "Three Seventeenth-Century Masters" (Lully, Couperin and Rameau) the following week. John Ireland and Arnold Bax were joint composers on 6 March 1944, followed by Benjamin Britten and William Walton on 27 March 1944.
- The first composer to be chosen for a second set of episodes was Schumann – first series 6 September 1943, second series 26 June 1944. Mozart was chosen for the second time on 10 July 1944. From this point on the majority of choices were repeats, suggesting a core repertoire of around 60 composers.
- In July 2014 the first of a series of live editions with the BBC National Orchestra of Wales was broadcast to commemorate the 70th anniversary of the programme.
- In 2020 the Beethoven Unleashed series of 25 weekly editions (broadcast on alternate weeks) marked the 250th anniversary of the composer's birth. There were 125 programmes in total, including a final personal highlights selection by Donald Macleod to conclude the series.
- Coverage of women composers and the spread of ethnicity have both been expanded in the 21st century. Donald Macleod cites the July 2022 episodes on Hélène de Montgeroult, whose music saved her from the guillotine, as "one of the best stories I've ever had to tell".
