= Ian McIntyre =

British radio producer (1931–2014)

- Born: 9 December 1931; Banchory, Scotland
- Died: 19 April 2014 (aged 82)

Ian McIntyre (9 December 1931 – 19 April 2014) was a British BBC Radio producer, journalist, broadcaster and author. who was Controller of BBC Radio 4 from 1976 to 1978 and then Controller of BBC Radio 3 between 1978 and 1987.

After joining the BBC in 1957 after National Service, he presented and produced a number of influential current affairs programmes, most notably Analysis and At Home and Abroad. After his retirement from Radio 3 in 1987, he became associate editor of The Times and has written a number of biographical books.

== Early life ==
Ian McIntyre attended Prescot Grammar School in Prescot, Lancashire, then read Modern Languages at St. John's College, Cambridge, where he was President of the Union; his contentious style of chairmanship led to the formal vote of thanks at his retirement debate being unprecedentedly opposed (see below).

After graduating from Cambridge in 1953 McIntyre spent a postgraduate year at the College of Europe in Bruges, Belgium, followed by National Service in the Intelligence Corps in Sussex. In February 1957 he joined the BBC as a producer in the Topical Talks Unit, initially working on a twice-weekly current affairs magazine programme At Home and Abroad. After two years he was made Editor of At Home and Abroad, which he did for a year. He was then moved to become a course organiser at the BBC Training School, but after a year he left to join the Independent Television Authority (ITA), though he only stayed there a short time.

McIntyre spent much of the 1960s working at the Conservative Central Office in Scotland, and stood unsuccessfully as a member of parliament against David Steel.

== BBC career ==
=== Analysis ===
Ian McIntyre returned to the BBC as a freelancer making documentaries around the world, initially for Radio 3. At the tail end of the 1960s, his old friend and colleague Tony Whitby – then controller of Radio 4 – asked him to present a new series of current affairs programmes. McIntyre stated in 1999 that Tony Whitby proposed a remit to provide "serious current affairs broadcasting...that...should be a sort of demonstration of good faith to the listener that there were going to be serious things done". The brief of the programme was to "make them challenging, make them interesting, and make them amusing if you can". Thus in 1970 Ian McIntyre became the founder presenter of Analysis.

=== Radio 4 ===
In 1976 Ian McIntyre was appointed Controller of BBC Radio 4. According to BBC producer Simon Elmes, he gained the nickname "Mack the Knife" due to his programme of cuts and abrasive style of governance, described by producer Piers Plowright as "ruthless". At one meeting, the head of radio drama Ronald Mason was said to have become so infuriated that he "threw his chair across the room and stalked off." As part of the cuts, McIntyre halved the length of PM and the Today Programme, in the latter case filling the spare air time with the short-lived lighter breakfast news programme Up to the Hour.

In 1978 he commissioned Fritz Spiegl to produce the Radio 4 UK Theme, an arrangement of traditional British melodies to signify Radio 4 as a service which, from its move from medium wave to 1500 metres/200 kiloHertz long wave on 23 November 1978, would for the first time broadcast a unified service to the whole United Kingdom (i.e. without the regional opt-outs which it had inherited from the old Home Service in 1967).

=== Radio 3 ===
McIntyre was moved sideways to become controller of Radio 3 in 1978. According to his colleague, Howard Newby, this was "to create smoother waters at Radio 4". He remained at Radio 3 for nine years. During his tenure, relations with several departments, especially the Music Division became uncomfortable; financial cuts at the BBC hit Radio 3 hard in 1980 and an internal paper recommended the disbandment of several of the BBC orchestras. Industrial action by musicians delayed the start of the Proms after redundancies in the Music Division.

In 1987 a decision was taken to merge the positions of Controller, Music (held by John Drummond who had also been running the Proms), and Controller, Radio 3 (held by McIntyre). Drummond was appointed and McIntyre left the BBC shortly afterwards.

== Later life ==
After leaving the BBC Ian McIntyre authored a number of biographical books including Joshua Reynolds: The Life and Times of the Royal Academy's First President, The Expense of Glory: A Life of John Reith, Dirt and Deity: A Life of Robert Burns, Hester: The remarkable life of Dr Johnson's "Dear Mistress" and a biography of 18th century actor David Garrick. He died at the age of 82 on 19 April 2014.

== Publications ==
=== Books ===
- McIntyre, Ian (1968). The proud doers: Israel after twenty years. British Broadcasting Corporation. London: British Broadcasting Corporation. ISBN 978-0-563-08329-0.
- Dogfight: The Transatlantic Battle Over Airbus, Greenwood Press, 1992, ISBN 0-275-94278-3
- The Expense of Glory: Life of John Reith, HarperCollins, 1994, ISBN 0-00-638351-3
- Dirt & Deity: A Life of Robert Burns, HarperCollins, 1995, ISBN 0-00-215964-3
- Garrick, Allen Lane, 1999, ISBN 0-7139-9328-6
- Robert Burns: A Life, Welcome Rain Publishers, 2001, ISBN 1-56649-205-X
- Joshua Reynolds: The Life and Times of the First President of the Royal Academy, Penguin/Allen Lane, 2003, ISBN 0-7139-9329-4
- Hester: The remarkable life of Dr Johnson's 'Dear Mistress', Constable & Robinson, 2008, ISBN 978-1-84529-449-6
- Robert Burns: A Life (revised edition), Constable & Robinson, 2009, ISBN 978-1-84529-469-4

=== Articles ===
- Johnson and Garrick: the Ninth Annual Johnson Society Lecture
- Book review: In the highest degree odious – A W Brian Simpson
