= In Tune (radio programme) =

British music radio programme

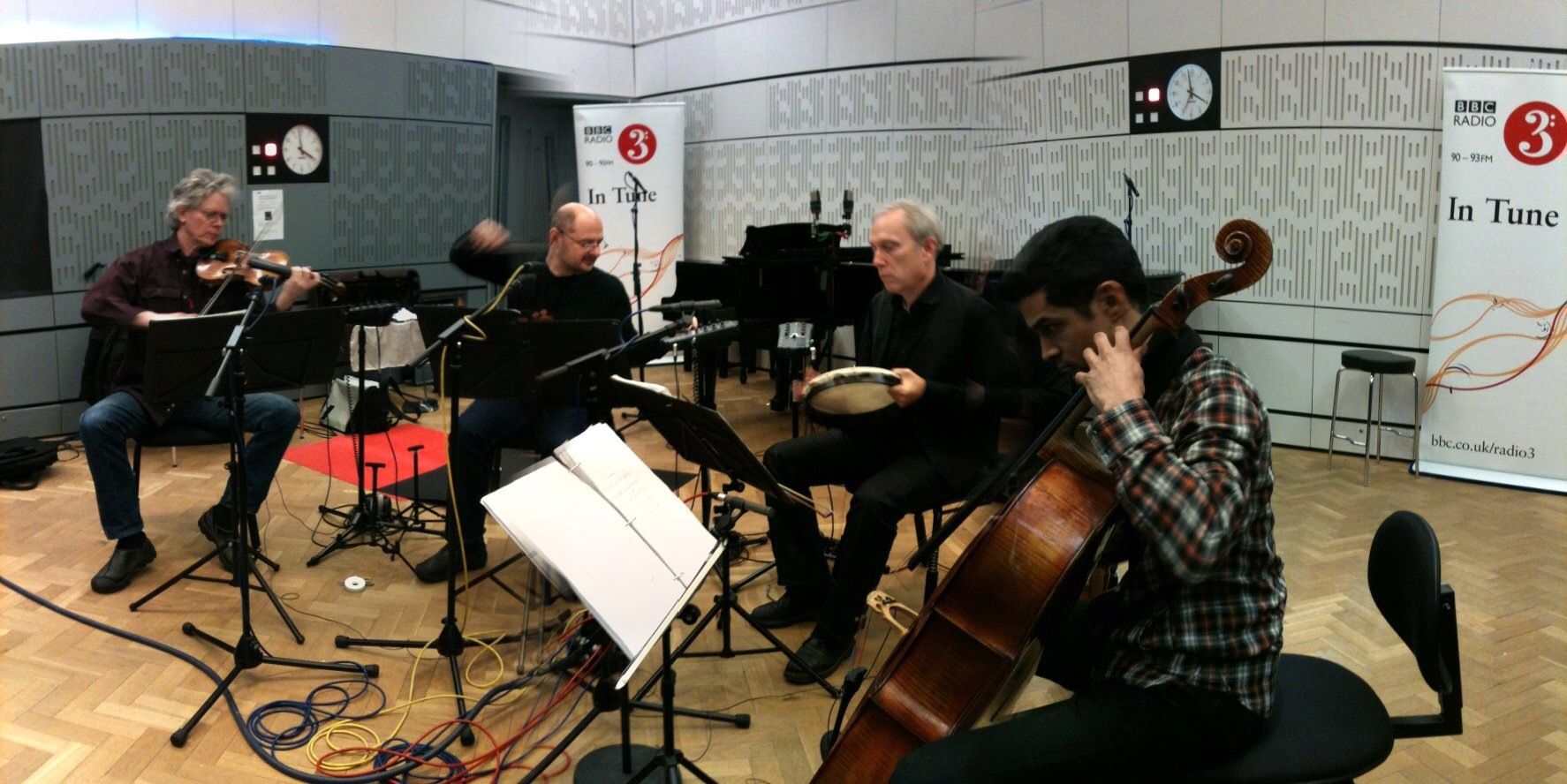
- The Kronos Quartet performing live on In Tune in 2012
- Genre: Classical, jazz, folk, world music
- Country of origin: United Kingdom
- Language: English
- Home station: BBC Radio 3
- Hosted by: Katie Derham and Petroc Trelawny
- Recording studio: Broadcasting House, London
- Original release: 13 July 1992
- Audio format: Stereophonic sound
- Website: www.bbc.co.uk/programmes/b006tp0c

In Tune is a British music magazine programme on BBC Radio 3. It is broadcast in the weekday evening "drivetime" slot and features a mix of live and recorded classical, jazz, folk and world music, interviews with musicians, and arts news. It is billed as "Radio 3's flagship early evening music programme".

In Tune is broadcast live from the BBC's Broadcasting House in London, and has been noted for its relaxed, convivial style of presentation.

== Format ==
Each programme is followed by the Classical Mixtape (formerly In Tune Mixtape), a 30-minute playlist of music compiled in the style of a mixtape with no presenter commentary. The playlist usually features an eclectic mix of classical, jazz, folk and world music.

== History ==
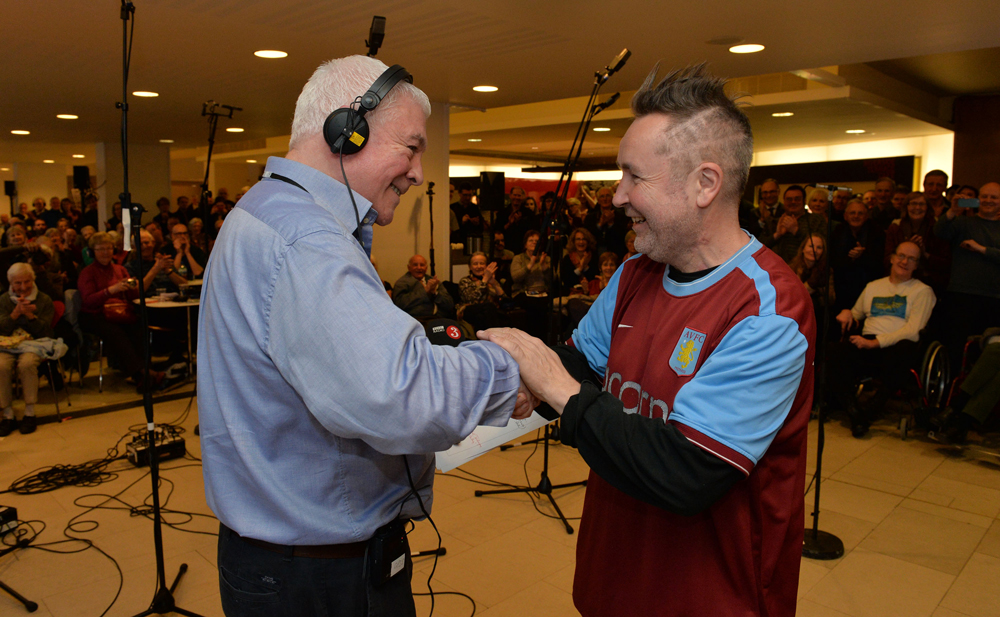
Presenter Sean Rafferty with violinist Nigel Kennedy at a live broadcast of In Tune from the Southbank Centre in 2014

The programme was first broadcast on 13 July 1992, hosted by Natalie Wheen. It was launched in response to the forthcoming launch of the competitor radio station Classic FM. Early shows were additionally presented by Humphrey Carpenter. From 1997 to 2024, the show's principal host was Sean Rafferty, a presenter known for his work on BBC Northern Ireland.

In 2017, Katie Derham joined the programme as a presenter. Derham was an established broadcaster on BBC arts programming, and was especially known as a presenter on BBC Proms. Broadcaster Suzy Klein has also presented the show. In June 2024, the BBC announced that Rafferty would leave Radio 3 in April 2025, and that Petroc Trelawny would replace him as a co-presenter of In Tune alongside Derham. Rafferty departed earlier than had been announced, presenting his final show on 6 December 2024. Rafferty stated that he felt "shell-shocked" about the decision by the new Radio 3 controller Sam Jackson to remove him from In Tune, and he decided to leave the station entirely.

Other occasional In Tune presenters include Ian Skelly, Sara Mohr-Pietsch, Martin Handley and Sarah Walker.
