= Alan Davey (civil servant) =

British civil servant

Alan Davey CBE
- Davey in 2009

Chairman of Trinity Laban

Personal details
- Born: 12 November 1960 (age 66) Stockton-on-Tees, England
- Education: University of Birmingham (BA English); Merton College, Oxford (M.Litt); Birkbeck, University of London (MA)
- Occupation: Arts administrator; public servant
- Years active: 1985–present
- Employers: Health Dept. (1985–90); Dept. of National Heritage / DCMS (1992–2007); Arts Council England (Chief Executive, 2008–14); BBC Radio 3 (Controller, 2015–23)
- Honours: Commander of the Order of the British Empire (CBE, 2015)

Alan Davey CBE (born 12 November 1960) is a British arts administrator, public servant, and civil servant.

== Biography ==
The son of an electrician, Davey grew up in Stockton-on-Tees and attended The Grangefield Academy. He later studied at the University of Birmingham (BA, English, 1982), Merton College, Oxford and Birkbeck, University of London.

Starting as an Administration Trainee in the Department of Health and Social Security in 1985, he was Private Secretary to the Minister of State for Health, 1988–90. He went to the Department of National Heritage in 1992 to head the National Lottery Bill Team. He was Principal Private Secretary to the Secretary of State for National Heritage from 1993 to 1994, then Head of European Business, Medicines Control Agency from 1995 to 1997, then secretary of the Royal Commission on Long Term Care from 1997 to 1999. He was awarded a Fulbright/Helen Hamlyn Scholarship in 1999. After this, at the Department of Culture, Media and Sport, he was Head of Arts Division from January 2001 to April 2004, and subsequently Director of Arts and Culture from May 2004 to December 2007. Davey was chief executive of Arts Council England from 2008 to 2014. In January 2015, Davey became controller of BBC Radio 3. In September 2022, the BBC announced that Davey is to stand down as controller of BBC Radio 3 in March 2023. In July 2020, Davey was named chairman of Trinity Laban, succeeding Geoffrey Copland.

Davey was appointed Commander of the Order of the British Empire (CBE) in the 2015 New Year Honours for services to the arts.
