= Record Review (radio programme) =

British radio program, since 1949

- Other names: CD Review (1998–2015)
- Genre: Classical music
- Country of origin: United Kingdom
- Language: English
- Home station: BBC Radio 3
- Hosted by: Andrew McGregor
- Recording studio: Broadcasting House, London
- Original release: 1949; 77 years ago – present
- Audio format: Stereophonic sound
- Website: Official website

Record Review is a Saturday morning radio programme (usually airing from 9 am to 11:45 am) dealing with recent classical music releases, topical issues and interviews. The programme title is a return of Record Review which was broadcast on Network Three occasionally from 1949, then weekly from 1957 presented by John Lade and then from 1981, Paul Vaughan, until 1998. As of October 2020, the regular presenter of Record Review is Andrew McGregor.

From 1998 to 2015 it became CD Review, with the format remaining largely the same. Then, from 2 January 2016, its title reverted to Record Review to reflect the diversity of media proliferating (CDs, downloads, streaming, and so forth).

It includes the feature Building a Library which surveys and recommends available recordings of specific works. In 2006 The Guardian's Martin Kettle attacked Building a Library as "elitist" for including such composers as Karl Amadeus Hartmann and Elliott Carter and lesser-known works of great composers, at the expense of well-known mainstream works. However, the charge was rebutted by the programme's producer, Mark Lowther, who said that Radio 3 audiences wanted programmes that challenged and inspired.

In April 2024, Record Review was moved from a 3-hour slot on Saturday morning to a 2-hour slot in the afternoon.
