= John Drummond (arts administrator) =

British arts administrator

Sir John Richard Gray Drummond CBE (25 November 1934 – 6 September 2006) was a British arts administrator who spent most of his career at the BBC. He was described by Rodney Milnes of Opera magazine as "one of the most formidable figures in the arts world of the UK for 40 years".

== Early life ==
Drummond was born in London, the son of a Scottish Sea Captain in the British India line and an Australian singer, principally of lieder. He spent much of his childhood in Bournemouth, being evacuated to the resort at the beginning of World War II, spending hours in the public library absorbing all he could on creative arts, and also attending concerts by the Bournemouth Symphony Orchestra.

He was educated at Canford School on a scholarship (becoming head boy) and, during his National Service in the Navy, he studied Russian on the course at Bodmin. On a major open scholarship, gained in 1953, he read History at Trinity College, Cambridge from 1955 to 1958. At Cambridge he organised cabarets for the Footlights Society and in 1956 wrote a musical about Regency Brighton entitled The First Resort. Kenneth Tynan queried why Cambridge was "wasting time on trash like this when they could be producing Brecht", but it did gain a run a London's Arts Theatre.

His contemporaries included Derek Jacobi, Peter Cook, Michael Frayn and Ian McKellen, and he was also a member of the Marlowe Society, performing in Christopher Marlowe's Edward II, which was broadcast on the Third Programme in 1958 with Jacobi in the title role.

== Career ==
In 1958, he gained a BBC general traineeship, and his early career at the BBC was as a foreign correspondent (Drummond spoke fluent French and Russian). In 1961, he went with Richard Dimbleby, Robin Day and David Attenborough to make a series of documentary films in the Soviet Union, selected with his Russian language skills in mind. Later that year he began a two-year assignment for news and current affairs in Paris as assistant to Robin Scott.

In 1964, he was part of the launch team for BBC 2, and he directed/produced arts programmes for BBC Television, including The Golden Ring, a documentary about Georg Solti's Decca recording of the complete Der Ring des Nibelungen (Ring Cycle) by Wagner, a biography of singer Kathleen Ferrier, programmes about Diaghilev, a series on architecture Spirit of the Age, and masterclasses by French cellist Paul Tortelier. His interest in ballet and dance was reflected in many of the programmes he produced for the BBC, and he appeared as presenter in many of them.

Ultimately he became Assistant Head of Music and Arts at the insistence of his immediate superior, Humphrey Burton, before becoming director of the Edinburgh International Festival at the end of 1977. Drummond's period at the Festival was particularly successful, and Norman Lebrecht commended him in a tribute for his multi-disciplinary approach in a celebration of 'fin de siècle' Vienna in 1983. In his Guardian obituary, Humphrey Burton listed several highlights from his tenure in Edinburgh: operas in 1980 including Peter Maxwell Davies' The Lighthouse, for international theatre 1979 with the Rustaveli Company, Georgia, and 1980 for Bill Bryden's adaptation of the York and Wakefield mystery plays for the National Theatre, and starting a book fair and commissioning the Queen's Hall as a festival chamber music venue.

== Radio 3 and later life ==
After leaving his post in Edinburgh in 1983, he returned to the BBC and was appointed Controller, Music (in tandem with his predecessor Robert Ponsonby for a year as Controller, Designate) in 1985 and then Controller of Radio 3 (1987–92) when the two posts were merged. He was succeeded by Nicholas Kenyon as Controller of Radio 3, but Drummond continued to be responsible for the Proms until his last season in 1995. His programming included Panic by Harrison Birtwistle which was premiered at the Last Night of the Proms.

While Controller of Radio 3, Drummond introduced the co-ordination of interval talks with the evening concert, doubled the length of the Saturday morning Record Review programme and scheduled the first Jazz concert at the Proms with Loose Tubes in 1987. He also devised 'weekends' covering all the arts in a particular city (Minneapolis, Berlin). Humphrey Carpenter wrote that Drummond viewed Radio 3's audience as consisting of "thirty minority tastes, each of which is characterised by its intense dislike of the other twenty-nine".

Drummond criticised Nigel Kennedy in 1991 for wearing a black cloak and 'Dracula' make-up while performing Berg's Violin Concerto, and comparing Kennedy's usual punk clothing to the vulgarity of Liberace. Kennedy had irritated him by claiming Drummond had an "attitude problem" and represented "the typical arrogance of a self-appointed guardian of the arts world".

Having chosen not to renew his contract as Radio 3 Controller for a second five-year term in 1992, he became openly critical of the Birt regime at the BBC, for its managerial and populist instincts. For Drummond, the BBC "has been an organisation which has seen itself as leading society, not following taste. If it no longer wishes to be that, I can't see any reason for its existence." At about the same time, he called Tony Blair a "professional philistine" and attacked the Blair government for destroying "the national sense of culture". At the very end of his autobiography he attacked what he saw as trends in the arts: "The lowest-common-denominator, accessibility-at-any-price, anti-intellectual laziness of so many of today's leaders [...] is a form of appeasement. Failing or refusing to differentiate between the good and the indifferent, while sheltering under a cloak of spurious democracy, is simply not good enough. It is a betrayal of all our civilization has stood for".

== Other activities and honours ==
John Drummond was chairman of The Theatres Trust (1998–2001). He had also been on the Council of Management of the new music group, the Fires of London. In 1998 he made the annual Royal Philharmonic Society lecture with the title "Taking Music Seriously".

He was appointed a CBE in 1990 and knighted five years later. When approached by the French Ambassador in London (Jean Guéguinou) to offer Drummond a Légion d'honneur, the Foreign Office refused it on the grounds that as he worked for the BBC he was a Crown servant; the year after when he had left the BBC, he was offered directly, and accepted the honour.

== Bibliography ==
- A Fine and Private Place: a collection of epitaphs and inscriptions (with Joan Bakewell), 1977, Weidenfeld and Nicolson, ISBN 0-297-77432-8
- Speaking of Diaghilev, 1997, Faber, ISBN 0-571-17864-2
- Tainted by Experience: a Life in the Arts, 2000, Faber, ISBN 0-571-20922-X

| Preceded by Ian McIntyre | Controller, BBC Radio 3; 1987–1992 | Succeeded by Nicholas Kenyon |
