= Roger Wright (music administrator) =

English arts administrator (born 1956)

Sir Roger Wright CBE
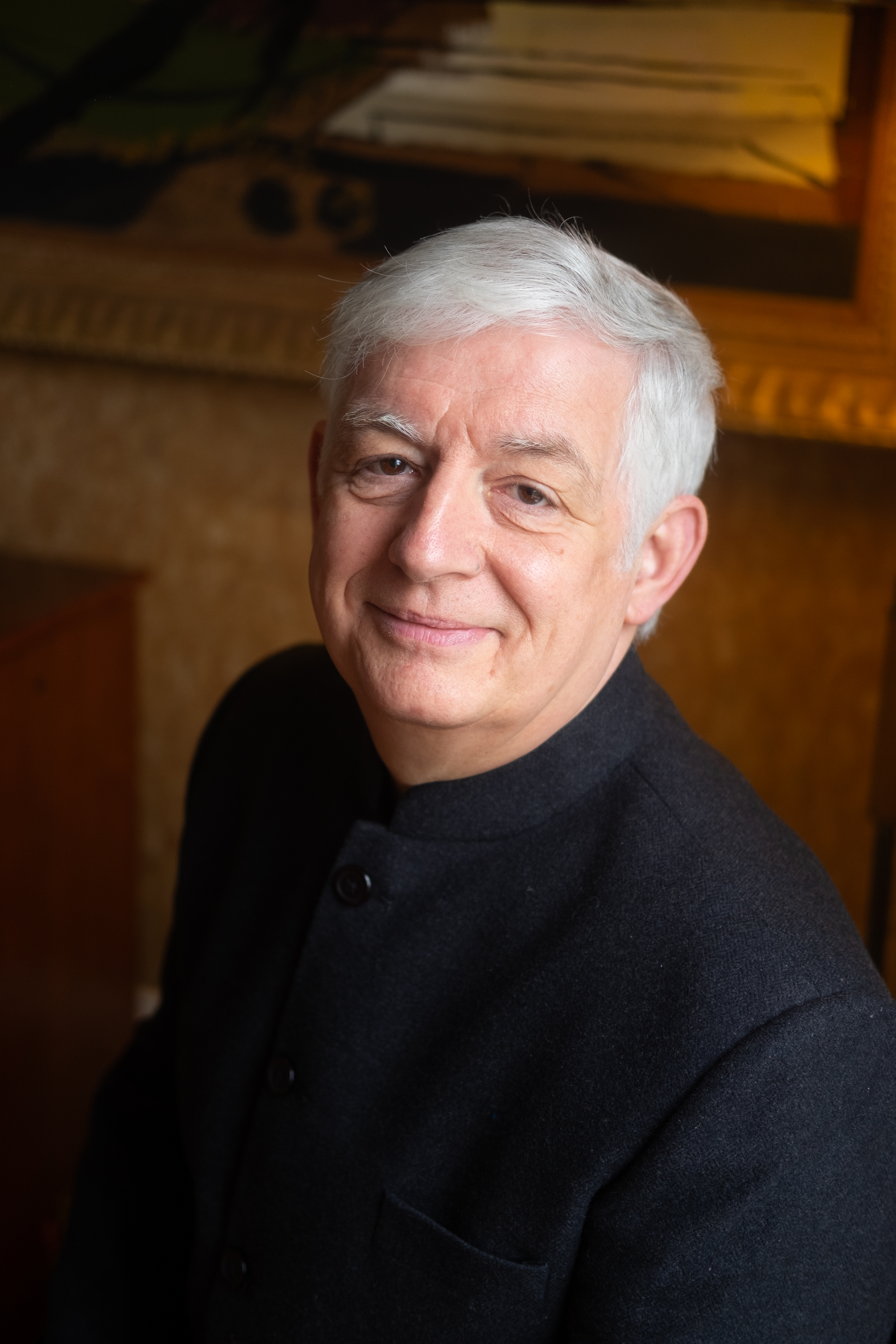
- Sir Roger Wright CBE. © Dan Nickells
- Born: Roger William Wright; 10 February 1956; Manchester, England
- Education: Royal Holloway College, University of London (B.Mus.)
- Occupation: Arts administrator

Sir Roger William Wright CBE (born 15 August 1956) is an English arts administrator. Roger Wright was CEO of Britten Pears Arts until the end of July 2024 when he left the role after 10 years. Wright was appointed the role of Chief Executive of The Rothschild Foundation in October 2024. The Rothschild Foundation was established in 2010 as a charity supporting arts, heritage, the environment and social welfare by awarding grants, fostering dialogue and debate, and through its support of Waddesdon Manor.

== Biography ==
Wright was born in Manchester, where he was educated at Chetham's School of Music, and played the cello as a youth. He studied music at Royal Holloway College, University of London, and earned a B.Mus. in 1977. On graduation, he took a sabbatical year, 1977–78, as the elected President of the Student Union.

From 1978 to 1986, Wright worked at the British Music Information Centre (BMIC), as librarian and manager, then as director. He served as a senior producer for the BBC Symphony Orchestra from 1986 to 1989. He became the artistic administrator of The Cleveland Orchestra in 1989. He left his Cleveland post in 1992 for Deutsche Grammophon (DG), where he became an executive director and vice-president, and worked there until 1997.

In March 1997, Wright took up the newly created BBC post of Head of Classical Music, in charge of the BBC's orchestras, choirs, and bands. In 1998, he became Controller of Radio 3. During his Radio 3 tenure he raised the profile of jazz and world music, causing controversy among listeners. Other Radio 3 programming changes such as a perceived diminution of live music broadcasts also attracted controversy, in addition to a perceived dilution of the level of programming. Wright was named Director of the BBC Proms in April 2007 and formally took up the post in October 2007, succeeding Nicholas Kenyon. In March 2014, he announced his resignation from the BBC to become chief executive at Aldeburgh Music, effective September 2014. When Wright formally stood down as Controller of Radio 3 and of The Proms in July 2014, he was the longest serving controller of the station. Roger Wright was CEO of Britten Pears Arts until the end of July 2024 when he left the role after 10 years. Britten Pears Arts was established following Aldeburgh Music's merger with Snape Maltings in 2015, and Snape Maltings' merger with the Britten-Pears Foundation in 2020. Britten Pears Arts runs Snape Maltings, The Red House, Aldeburgh, and the Aldeburgh Festival.

In 2023, the Royal Academy of Music announced Wright as an Honorary Fellow. In 2002, Wright was awarded an Honorary Fellowship of Royal Holloway College. He is also an Honorary Fellow of the Royal College of Music and a Fellow of the Radio Academy. His publications include the volume New Music 1989, in collaboration with Michael Finnissy.

He was appointed Commander of the Order of the British Empire (CBE) in the 2015 New Year Honours for services to music. He was knighted in the 2024 King's Birthday Honours "for services to music".

Wright and his wife Rosie, a yoga teacher, have two children, Alice and William.
