= BBC Radio 3 =

British national radio station

- Logo used since 2022
- London and Salford; United Kingdom
- Frequencies: FM: 90.2–92.6 MHz; DAB: 12B (BBC National DAB); Freeview: 703; Freesat: 703; Sky (UK only): 0103; Virgin Media: 903; Virgin Media Ireland: 909; Astra 2E (28.2°E); Intelsat 901 (27.5°W)
- RDS: BBC R3

Programming
- Language: English
- Format: Classical, opera, jazz, world music, drama, culture and arts

Ownership
- Owner: BBC
- Sister stations: BBC Radio 3 Unwind

History
- First air date: 30 September 1967; 59 years ago (as BBC Radio 3); 29 September 1946; 80 years ago (as BBC Third Programme) (Note: Radio 3 was established to replace BBC Third Programme. The latter of these first broadcast in 1946. The BBC has had a broadcast since it acquired BBC Third Programme in 1946.)
- Former call signs: BBC Third Programme
- Former names: BBC Third Programme
- Former frequencies: 648 MW (1967–1978); 1215 MW (1978–1992)

Technical information
- Licensing authority: Ofcom

Links
- Website: BBC Radio 3 via BBC Sounds (UK Only)

BBC Radio 3 is a British national radio station owned and operated by the BBC. It replaced the BBC Third Programme in 1967 and broadcasts classical music and opera, with jazz, world music, drama, culture and the arts also featuring. The station has described itself as "the world's most significant commissioner of new music".

Through its New Generation Artists scheme, it promotes young musicians of all nationalities. The station broadcasts the BBC Proms concerts, live and in full, each summer in addition to performances by the BBC Orchestras and Singers. There are regular productions of both classic plays and newly commissioned drama.

Radio 3 won the Sony Radio Academy UK Station of the Year Gold Award for 2009 and was nominated again in 2011. According to RAJAR, the station broadcasts to a weekly audience of 1.9 million with a listening share of 1.6% as of July 2025.

== History ==
Radio 3 is the successor station to the Third Programme which began broadcasting on 29 September 1946. The name Radio 3 was adopted on 30 September 1967 when the BBC launched its first pop music station, Radio 1 and rebranded its national radio channels as Radio 2 (formerly the Light Programme), Radio 3, and Radio 4 (formerly the Home Service).

Radio 3 was the overall label applied to the collection of services which had until then gone under the umbrella title of the Third Network, namely:

- the Third Programme proper (as launched in 1946, an evenings-only offering of demanding cultural fare, both musical and spoken)
- the Music Programme (a daytime service of classical music)
- sports coverage (chiefly on Saturday afternoons) and adult educational programming in the early part of weekday evenings (known as Network Three).

All these strands, including the Third Programme, kept their separate identities within Radio 3 until 4 April 1970, when there was a further reorganisation following the introduction of the structural changes which had been outlined the previous year in the BBC document Broadcasting in the Seventies.

=== Broadcasting in the Seventies ===
On 10 July 1969 the BBC published its plans for radio and television in a policy document entitled Broadcasting in the Seventies. Later described in 2002 by Jenny Abramsky, Head of Radio and Music, as "the most controversial document ever produced by radio", the document outlined each station's target audience and what content should be broadcast on each channel. This concept went against the earlier methods laid out by the BBC's first Director General John Reith and caused controversy at the time, despite laying out the radio structure that is recognisable today.

At the time of the review, Radio 3 faced several problems. An early option to cut costs, required under the proposals, was to reduce the number of networks from four to three, so that Radio 3 would not broadcast during the day and would use the frequencies of either Radio 1 or 2 as the two stations would merge content. However "Day-time serious music would be the casualty" of these proposals and caused some controversy. A further rumour was expressed that Radio 3 could be closed altogether as a strong statistical case existed against the station according to The Guardian. However, the Director-General, Charles Curran, publicly denied this as "quite contradictory to the aim of the BBC, which is to provide a comprehensive radio service". Curran had earlier dismissed any suggestion that Radio 3's small audience was a consideration: "What is decisive is whether there is a worthwhile audience, and I mean by worthwhile an audience which will get an enormous satisfaction out of it."

As a result of Broadcasting in the Seventies, factual content, including documentaries and current affairs, were moved to BBC Radio 4 and the separate titled strands were abolished. The document stated that Radio 3 was to have "a larger output of standard classical music" but with "some element in the evening of cultural speech programmes – poetry, plays". Equally, questions were being asked by the poet Peter Porter about whether other spoken content, for example poetry, would remain on the station. These concerns also led to the composer Peter Maxwell Davies and the music critic Edward Greenfield to fear that "people would lose the mix of cultural experiences which expanded intellectual horizons". However, Radio 3 controller Howard Newby reassured these concerns by replying that only the coverage of political and economic affairs would be passed to Radio 4, and Radio 3 would keep drama, poetry, and talks by scientists, philosophers and historians.

The Broadcasting in the Seventies report also proposed a large cutback in the number and size of the BBC's orchestras. In September 1969, a distinguished campaign group entitled the Campaign for Better Broadcasting was formed to protest, with the backing of Sir Adrian Boult, Jonathan Miller, Henry Moore and George Melly. The campaign objected to "the dismantling of the Third Programme by cutting down its spoken word content from fourteen hours a week to six" and "segregating programmes into classes". Mention of the campaign even reached debate in the House of Commons.

=== The "arts" controllers ===
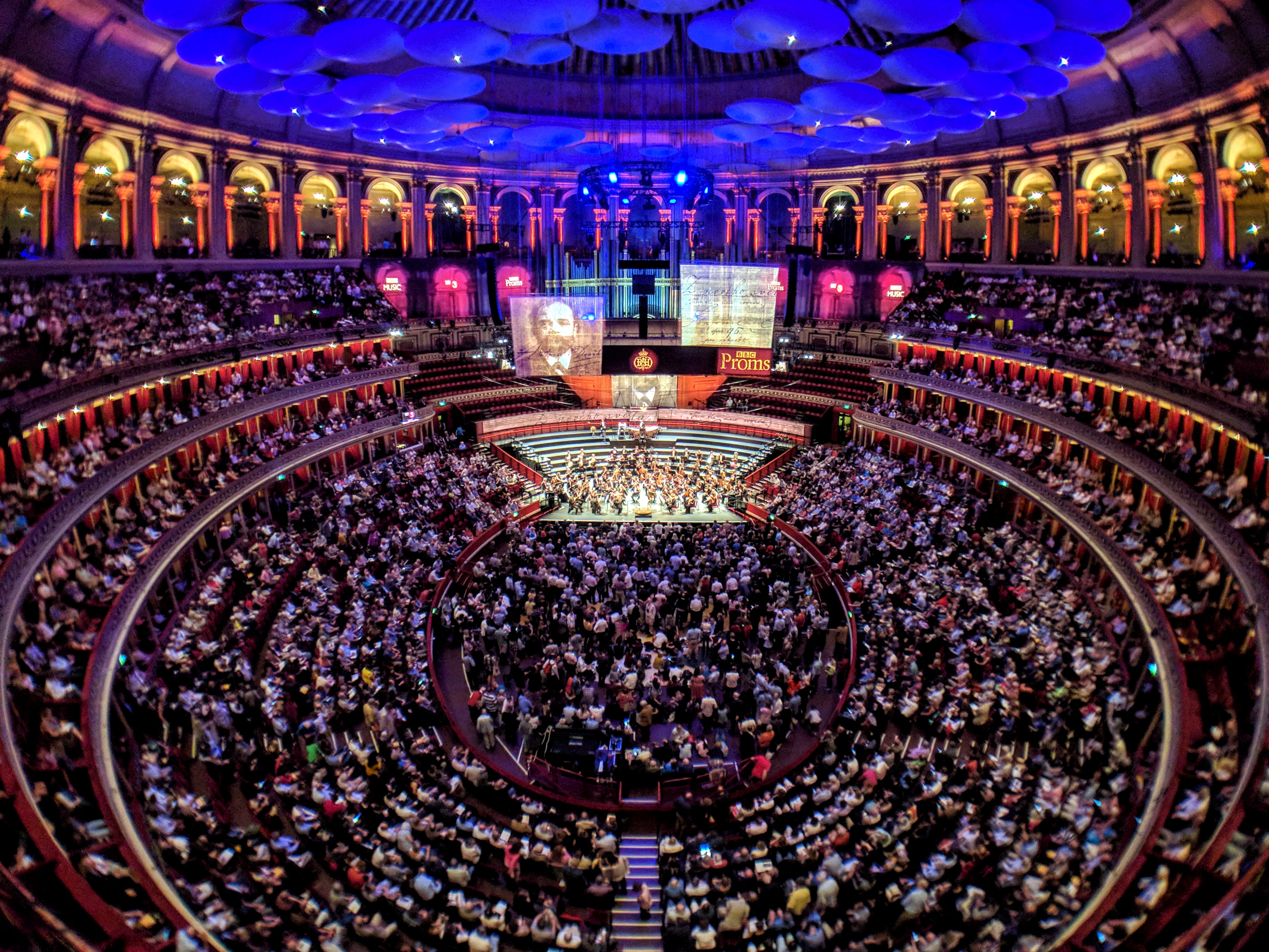
Radio 3 broadcasts the BBC Proms live every year from the Royal Albert Hall and other venues

From the launch until 1987, the controllers of Radio 3 showed preferences towards speech and arts programming as opposed to focus on classical music and the Proms. The first controller, Newby, made little contribution to the station, focusing on the transition from the Third programme to Radio 3 and as a result of the Broadcasting in the Seventies report.

The second controller, Stephen Hearst who assumed the role in 1972, was different. As Hearst had previously been head of television arts features his appointment was seen with scepticism among the staff who viewed him as a populariser. According to Hearst when interviewed for Humphrey Carpenter's book, the main rival candidate for controller Martin Esslin, head of Radio Drama, had said to the interviewing panel that audience figures should play no part in the decision-making process over programming. Hearst said he responded to the same question about this issue by commenting that as the station was financed by public money it needed to consider the size of its audience – there was a minimum viable figure but this could be increased with "a lively style of broadcasting".

Hearst attempted to make the content of the channel more accessible to a wider audience, but his efforts, which included the evening drivetime programme Homeward Bound and Sunday phone-in request programme Your Concert Choice (the former an uninterrupted sequence of musical items identified only at the end of the programme; the latter a resurrection from the old Home Service), were criticised. However, during this time the long running arts discussion programme Critics' Forum was launched as well as themed evenings and programmes of miscellaneous music including Sounds Interesting.

In 1978, Ian McIntyre took over as controller of Radio 3 but quickly faced uncomfortable relationships between departments. At approximately the same time Aubrey Singer became managing director of Radio and began to make programming on the station more populist in a drive to retain listeners in face of possible competition from competitors using a "streamed format". An example of this is the replacement of Homeward Bound in 1980 with an extended, presenter-driven programme called Mainly for Pleasure. The same year an internal paper recommended the disbandment of several of the BBC's orchestras and of the Music Division, resulting in low morale and industrial action by musicians that delayed the start of the Proms. Senior management was also getting dissatisfied with listening figures leading to the Director-General Alasdair Milne to suggest that presentation style was "too stodgy and old-fashioned".

=== The "music" controllers ===
In 1987 the positions of Controller of Music and Controller of Radio 3 were merged, and with it the operation of the Proms, under the former Music Controller John Drummond. Drummond, like Hearst, believed that the music programmes' presentation was too stiff and formal and he therefore encouraged announcers to be more natural and enthusiastic. Repeats of classic drama performances by the likes of John Gielgud and Paul Scofield were also included because, in his view, newer drama was "gloomy and pretentious". He also introduced features and celebrations of the anniversaries of famous figures including William Glock, Michael Tippett and Isaiah Berlin. Drummond also introduced the show Mixing It which targeted the music genres that fell between Radios 1 and 3, often seen as a precursor to the programme Late Junction.

During Drummond's time, Radio 3 also began to experiment with outside broadcasts, including an ambitious Berlin Weekend to mark the reunification of Germany in 1990, and a much praised weekend of programming that was broadcast from London and Minneapolis-St Paul – creating broadcasting history by being the first time a whole weekend had been transmitted "live from another continent". However, Drummond complained about the former that "not one single senior person in the BBC had listened to any part of it", reflecting his general feeling that the BBC senior management paid little attention stating: "I can't remember ever having a serious conversation with anyone above me in the BBC about Radio 3 ... I would much rather have had the feeling that they thought it mattered what Radio 3 did."

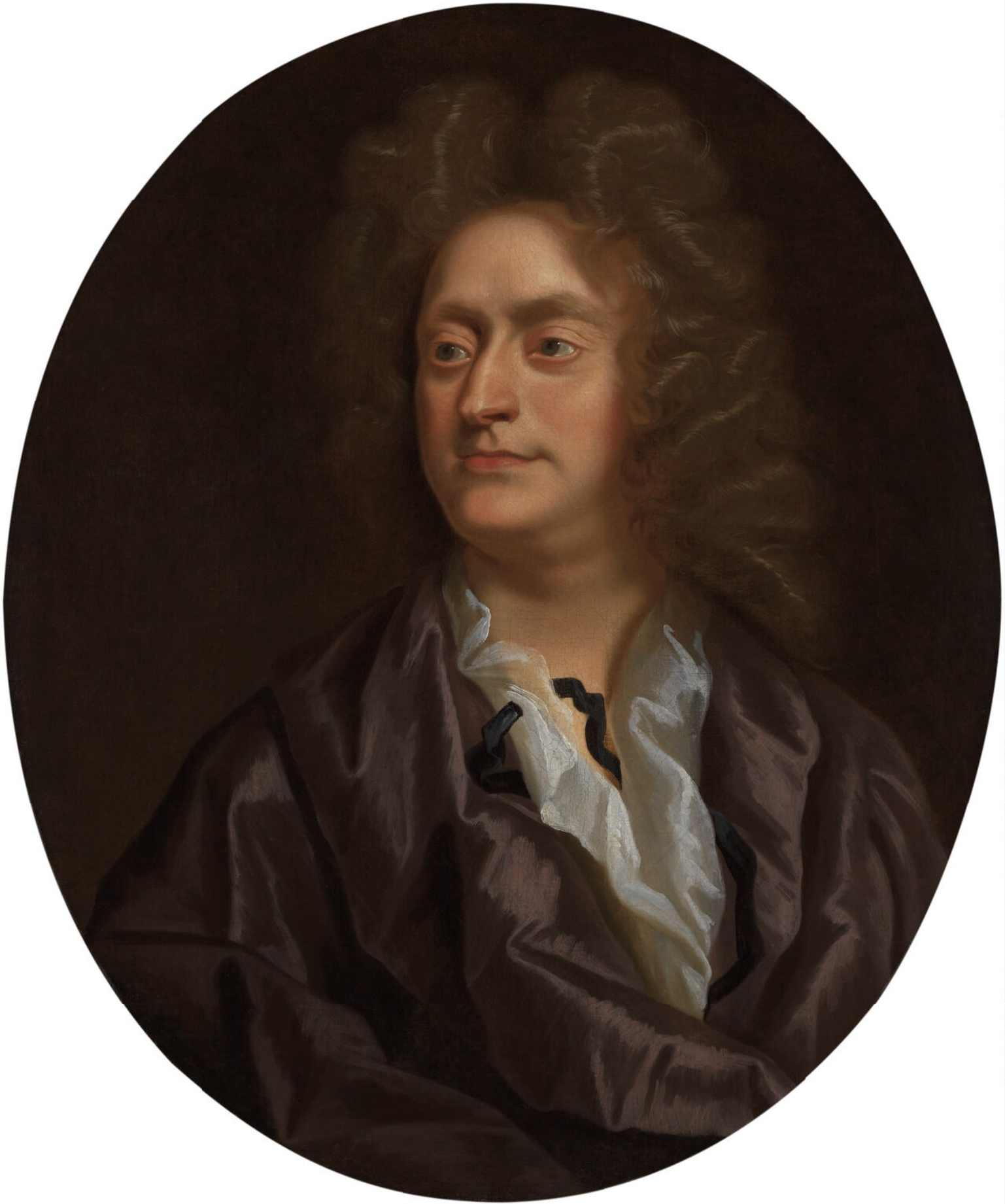
The tercentenary of Henry Purcell's death was marked in 1995 by the award-winning Radio 3 series Fairest Isle

Drummond's successor was Nicholas Kenyon, previously chief music critic of The Observer, who took over in February 1992 and was immediately faced with the looming launch date for commercial competitor Classic FM who were, and still remain, Radio 3's biggest rivals. Kenyon, similar to Singer a decade earlier, believed that Radio 3 had to make changes to its presentation before the new station began broadcasting rather than react later. As a result, three senior producers were sent to study classical music stations in the United States and the station hired advertising agents Saatchi & Saatchi to help improve public perception. Kenyon's tenure was to meet with much controversy: in attempts to update the station's presentation, popular announcers Malcolm Ruthven, Peter Barker and Tony Scotland were axed as well as drama being cut by a quarter, resulting in a letter of protest to The Times signed by Harold Pinter, Tom Stoppard and Fay Weldon among others; new weekday programmes for breakfast time and drive time, entitled On Air and In Tune respectfully, were launched, as was a new three-hour programme of popular classics on Sunday mornings fronted by Brian Kay.

These moves were defended by Kenyon who argued that the changes were not "some ghastly descent into populism" but were instead to create "access points" for new listeners. However, there was still "widespread disbelief" when it was announced in the summer that a new morning programme would take the 9 am spot from the revered Composer of the Week and would be presented by a signing from Classic FM – the disc jockey Paul Gambaccini. The criticism, especially once the programme went on air a few weeks later, was so unrelenting that Gambaccini announced the following spring that he would not be renewing his contract with Radio 3.

However, Kenyon's controllership was marked by several highly distinguished programming successes. Fairest Isle was an ambitious project from 1995 which marked the 300th anniversary of the death of Henry Purcell with a year-long celebration of British music and the programme Sounding the Century, which ran for two years from 1997, presented a retrospective of 20th-century music. Both won awards. He also introduced a number of well received specialist programmes including children's programme The Music Machine, early music programme Spirit of the Age, jazz showcase Impressions, vocal music programme Voices and the arts programme Night Waves.

BBC Radio 3 began nighttime transmissions in May 1996 with the introduction of Through the Night, consisting of radio recordings from members of the European Broadcasting Union and distributed to some of these other stations under the title Euroclassic Notturno since 1998. The introduction of 24-hour broadcasting resulted in the introduction of a fixed programming point at 22:00 so that if live programme overran, later programming could be cancelled to allow Through the Night to begin promptly.

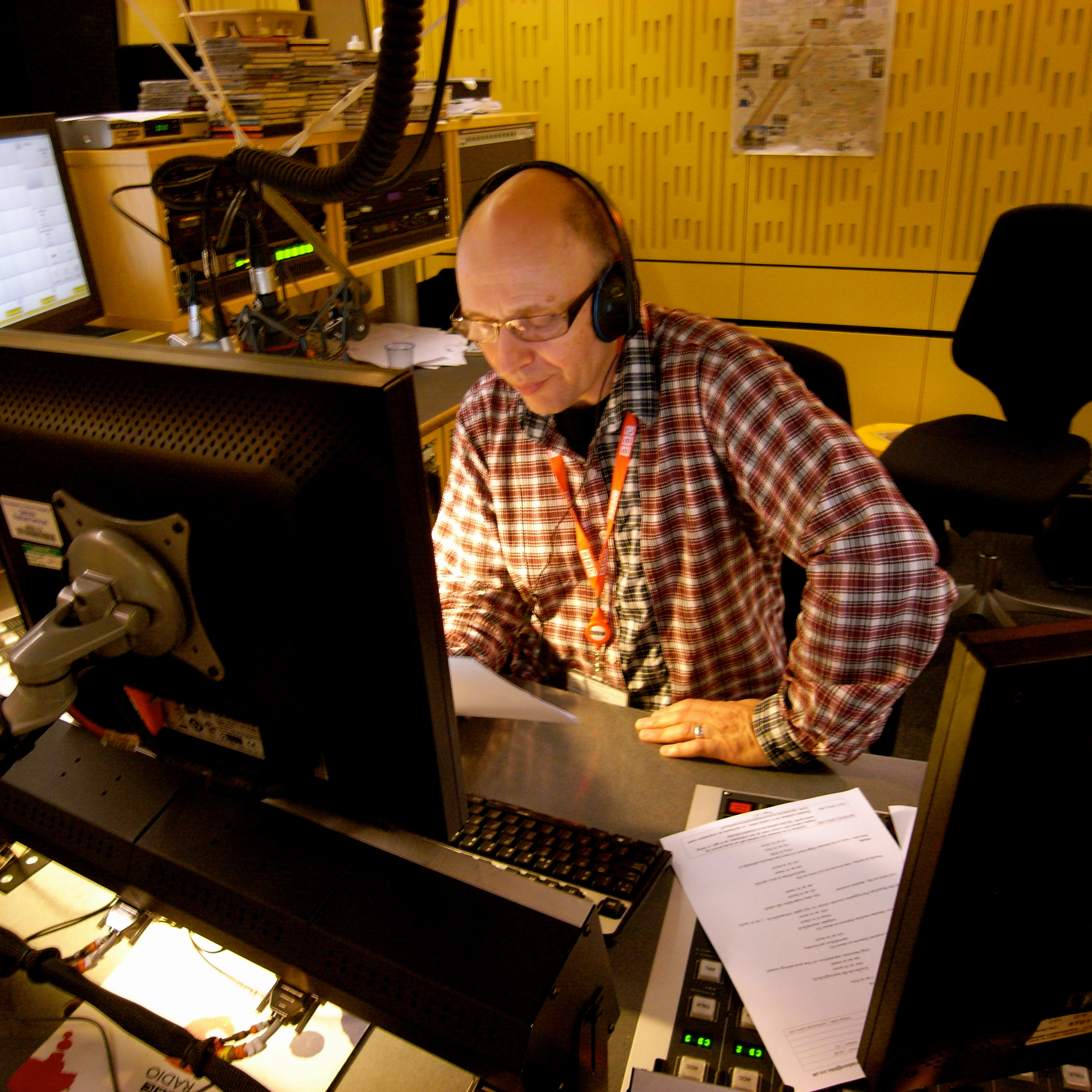
Max Reinhardt, former presenter of Late Junction

In 1998, Roger Wright took over as controller of the station. Soon after his appointment some changes were made to showcase a wider variety of music; a new, relaxed, late-night music programme Late Junction featured a wide variety of genres; programmes focusing on jazz and world music were given a higher profile as were programmes presented by Brian Kay, focusing on light music, and Andy Kershaw, whose show was previously dropped by Radio 1. In these changes, Wright believed that, in the case of the former, he was addressing "this feeling people had that they didn't want to put Radio 3 on unless they were going to listen carefully" and in the latter cases that he was "not dumbing down but smarting up" the programmes.

The BBC Radio 3 logo, 2001–2007

By 2004, Radio 3's programming and services were being recognised by the Corporation at large, as seen in the 2003/4 Charter renewal application and the Annual report for the year which reported that Radio 3 had "achieved a record [audience] reach in the first quarter of 2004", and by the government: the Secretary of State's foreword to the government's Green Paper in 2005 made special mention of "the sort of commitment to new talent that has made Radio 3 the largest commissioner of new music in the world" as a model for what the BBC should be about.

By 2008, however, the station faced pressures to increase its audience by making programmes more accessible while loyal listeners began to complain about the tone of these new changes. Presentation was described as "gruesome in tone and level" and global music output was mocked as "street-smart fusions" and "global pop". At the same time RAJAR began to record lower listening figures and decisions on policy were being changed resulting in the children's programme Making Tracks, experimental music programme Mixing It, theatre and film programme Stage and Screen and Brian Kay's Light Programme all being dropped, a reduction in the number of concerts and format changes to several other programmes. In spite of the changes, figures still continued to fall.

The mid- to late 2000s did, however, offer new projects undertaken on the station: The Beethoven Experience in June 2005 saw the broadcast of his works broadcast non-stop for six days. A similar project occurred six months later when A Bach Christmas was run for ten days in the lead to Christmas and in February 2007 when a week was similarly given over to the works of Tchaikovsky & Stravinsky, and Schubert in March 2012. As part of the original Beethoven Experience, the BBC trialled its first music downloads over the internet by offering free music downloads of all nine symphonies as played by the BBC Philharmonic Orchestra under Gianandrea Noseda. The stated aim was "to gauge audiences' appetite for music downloads and their preferred content, and will inform the development of the BBC strategy for audio downloads and on demand content". The experiment was wildly successful, attracting 1.4 million downloads but was met with anger from the major classical record labels who considered it unfair competition and "devaluing the perceived value of music". As a result, no further free downloads have been offered, including as part of the BBC iPlayer service, and the BBC Trust has ruled out any classical music podcasts with extracts longer than one minute.

BBC Radio 3 logo, 2007–2022

In 2007, Radio 3 also began to experiment with a visual broadcast as well as the audio transmissions. In October 2007, Radio 3 collaborated with the English National Opera in presenting a live video stream of a performance of Carmen, "the first time a UK opera house has offered a complete production online" and in September 2008, Radio 3 launched a filmed series of concerts that was available to watch live and on demand for seven days "in high quality vision". This strategy was also introduced to some of the BBC Proms concerts.

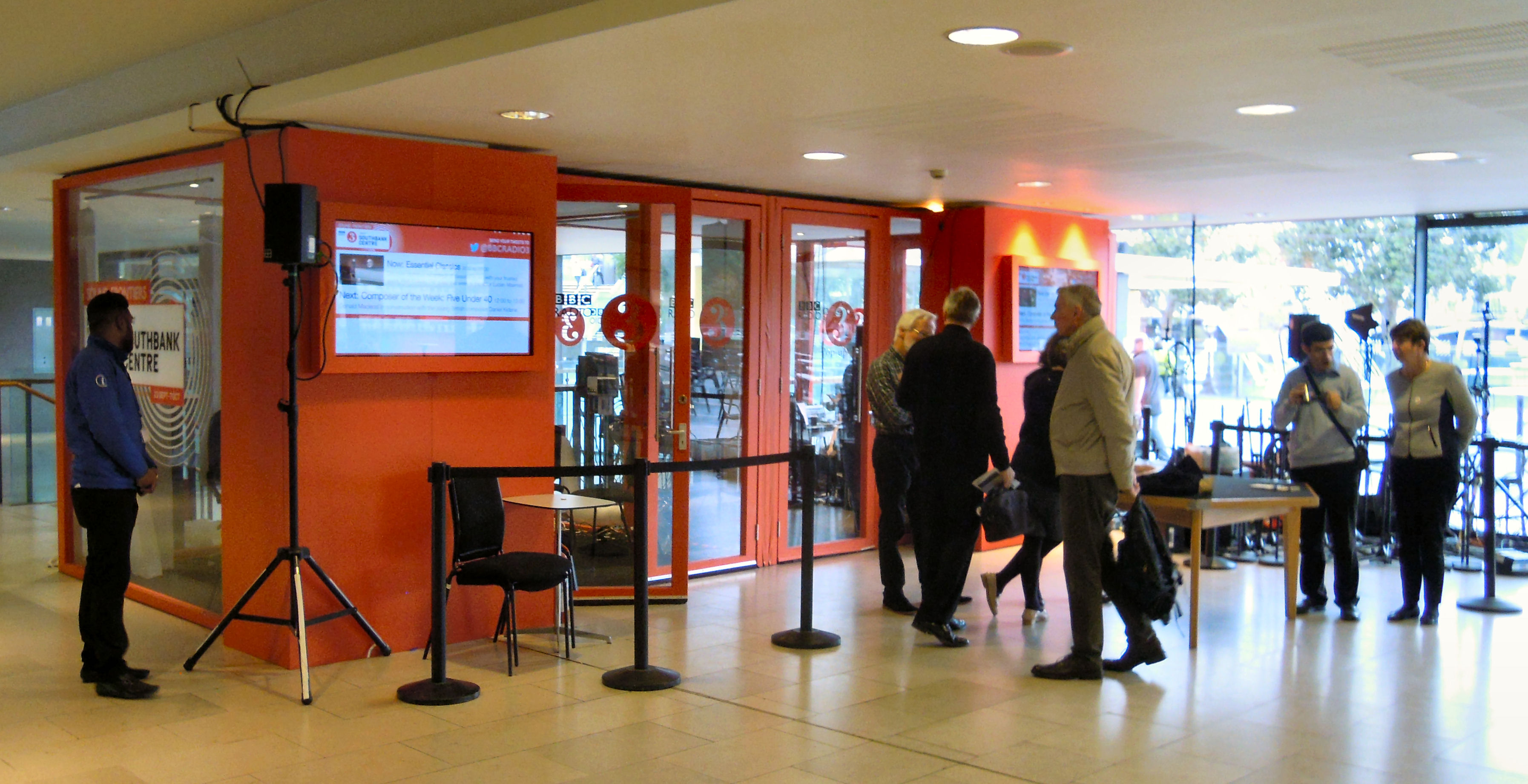
BBC Radio 3 broadcasting live from the Southbank Centre in 2016

By the latter years of the 2000s, Radio 3's prospects were improving. The year 2008/9 saw the introduction of more concerts and other innovations had introduced Radio 3's largest event to a wider audience. The introduction of family orientated concerts to the BBC Proms, which are broadcast live on Radio 3, helped the station to introduce itself to a younger audience. Innovations of this type began in 2008 with the introduction of a concert celebrating the music from the television programme Doctor Who as composed by Murray Gold and was later followed by a further Doctor Who prom in 2010, a free family prom in 2009, another free Horrible Histories prom in 2011 and a Wallace and Gromit prom in 2012. These particular concerts were introduced by Wright, who became Proms Director in addition to his duties at Radio 3 in October 2007, and many were also televised for broadcast at a later date. The mix in these proms of classical music to combine with music of a classical nature from the programmes was hoped to introduce a much younger audience to the genres catered for by Radio 3.

As of 2014 Radio 3 was having to undergo further changes as a result of recent findings from the BBC Trust. In the station's latest service review, carried out in 2010, the Trust recommended the station become more accessible to new audiences, easier to navigate through the different genres and to review the output of the BBC's orchestras and singers. Soon after this verdict, the licence fee was capped and the BBC given more services to pay for with the same level of income. As a result, the corporation had to reduce its costs. In the proposal entitled Delivering Quality First, the BBC proposed that Radio 3 contribute by broadcasting 25% fewer live or specially recorded lunchtime concerts and reducing the number of specially recorded evening concerts. The Trust did recognise, however, that "Radio 3 plays a vital role in the cultural and creative life of the UK" and as a result, the report did agree to reinvest in the Proms, to retain the long dramas found on the station and to continue to broadcast a new concert live each evening.

The current controller of Radio 3 is Sam Jackson, who replaced Alan Davey in April 2023.

== Operation ==
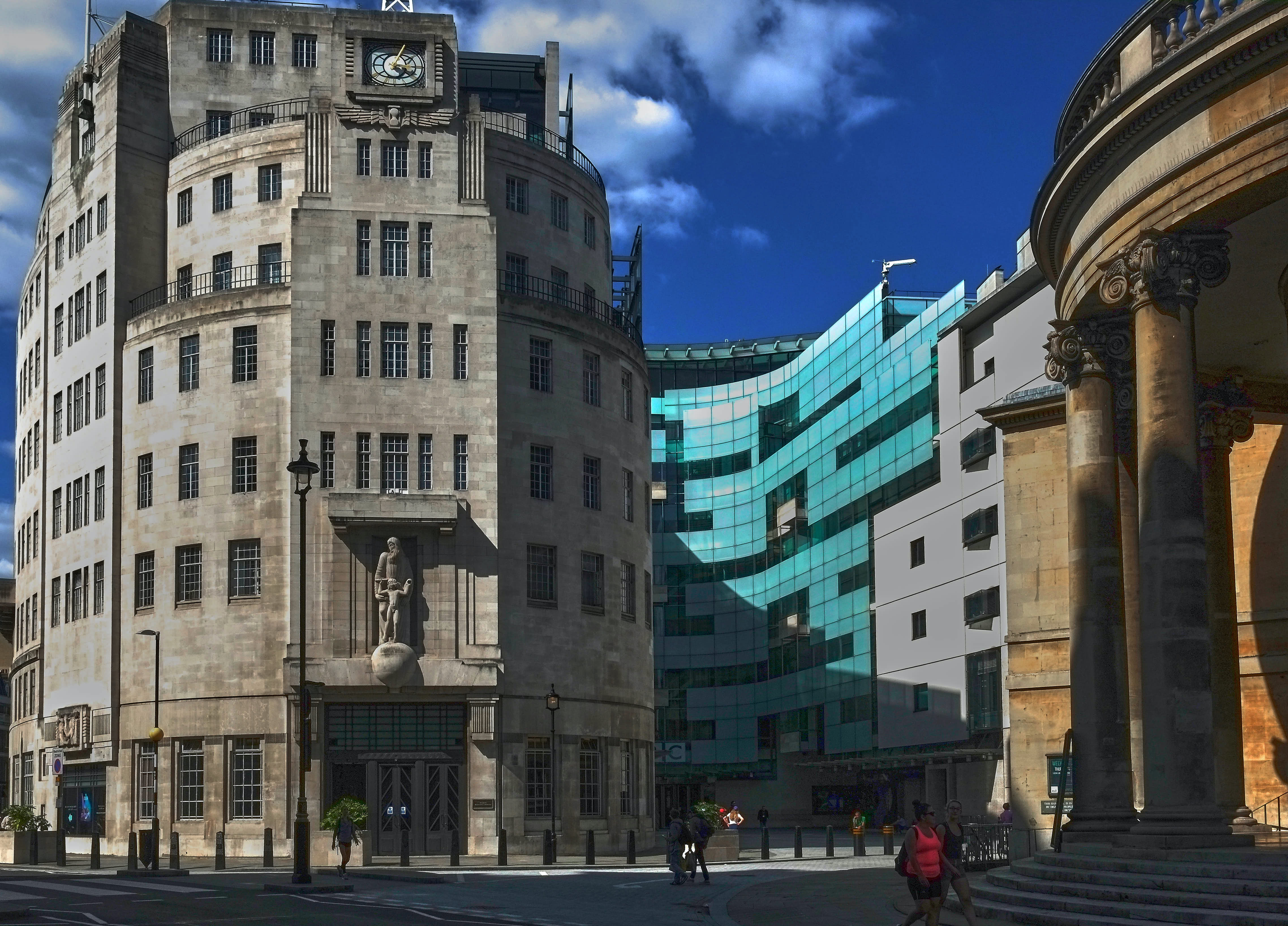
BBC Radio 3's studios are located in Broadcasting House, London.

BBC Radio 3 broadcasts from studios inside the 1930s wing of Broadcasting House in central London. However, in addition to these studios, certain programmes and performances are broadcast from other BBC bases including from BBC Cymru Wales' Cardiff headquarters and BBC North's headquarters at MediaCityUK, Salford. The BBC also has recording facilities at the Royal Albert Hall, the Royal Festival Hall and the Queen Elizabeth Hall which can be used to record and broadcast performances at these London venues.

Radio 3 is broadcast on the FM band between 90.2 and 92.6 MHz, on DAB Digital Radio, the digital television services Freeview, Freesat, Sky, Virgin Media, TalkTalk TV and Virgin Media Ireland and on BBC Sounds both online and on the app, where Radio 3 programmes can be listened back to.

On its FM frequencies, the station uses less dynamic range compression of the volume of music than rival station Classic FM. On DAB it uses dynamic range control (DRC) which allows compression to be defined by the user.

The station also uses a BBC-designed pulse-code modulation digitisation technique similar to NICAM, which is used for outside broadcasts running through a telephone line. This runs at a sample rate of 14,000 per second per channel. A similar technique was later used for recording at the same rate. In September 2010, for the final week of the Proms broadcasts, the BBC trialled XHQ (Extra High Quality), a live Internet stream transmitted at a rate of 320kbit/s, instead of Radio 3's usual 192 kbit/s, using its AAC-LC 'Coyopa' coding technology. This technology was later developed further, and Radio 3 became the first BBC Radio station to broadcast permanently in this High Definition Sound (as it has been termed) format.

== Notable programmes ==
=== Current programmes ===
==== Breakfast ====
BBC Radio 3's Breakfast programme originally launched in 1992 as On Air and took on its current name in 2007. It airs every day from 6:30am until 9:30am, with a 9:00 am finish at the weekend. Short news bulletins are broadcast on the hour.

==== Choral Evensong ====
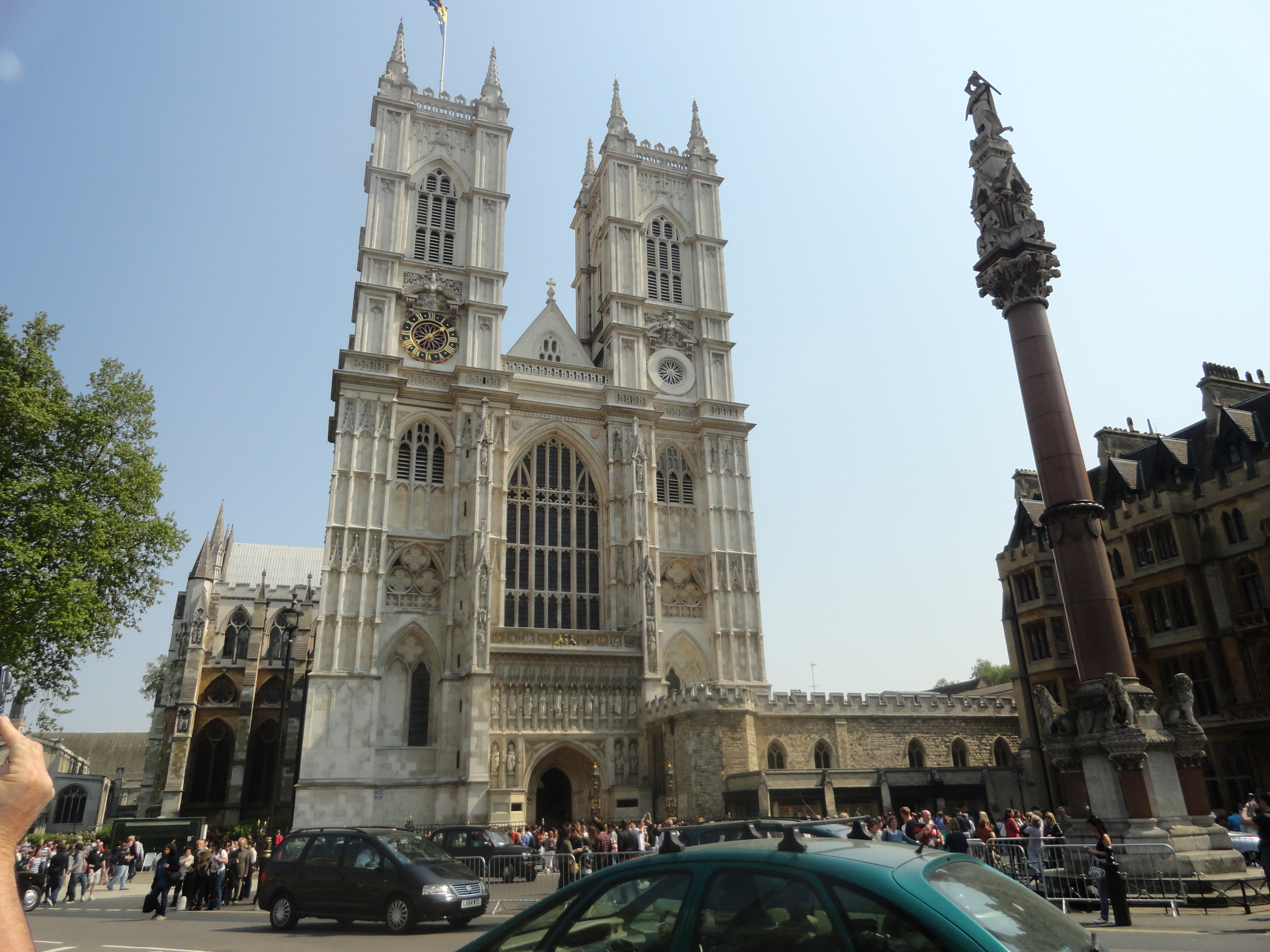
The first BBC broadcast of Choral Evensong came from Westminster Abbey in 1926

The Anglican service of sung evening prayer is broadcast on Wednesday afternoons. It is broadcast live from cathedrals, university college chapels and churches throughout the UK. On occasion, it broadcasts Choral Vespers from Catholic cathedrals, (such as Westminster Cathedral), Orthodox Vespers, or a recorded service from choral foundations abroad. Choral Evensong is the BBC's longest-running outside broadcast programme, the first edition having been relayed from Westminster Abbey on 7 October 1926. Its 80th anniversary was celebrated, also live from Westminster Abbey, with a service on 11 October 2006.

When Choral Evensong was moved from Radio 4 to Radio 3 with effect from 8 April 1970 and reduced to just one broadcast per month, the BBC received 2,500 letters of complaint, and weekly transmissions (on Wednesdays) were resumed on 1 July.

During the 1980s, there were two different broadcast programmes each week (on Wednesdays and Fridays). In 2007 - by which time there was just one transmission per week (on Wednesdays), the live broadcast was switched to Sundays, which again caused protests. The live transmission was returned to Wednesdays in September 2008, with a recorded repeat on Sunday afternoons at approximately the same time. Choral Evensong forms part of Radio 3's remit on religious programming though non-religious listeners have campaigned for its retention.

==== Composer of the Week ====
Composer of the Week was launched in the BBC Home Service on 2 August 1943 under its original title of This Week's Composer. From 15 December 1964 the programme became a regular feature in the schedule of the newly established daytime "Third Network" classical music service, the Music Programme (later to be absorbed into Radio 3). The programme was renamed Composer of the Week on 18 January 1988.

Each week, in five daily programmes, the work of a particular composer is studied in detail and illustrated with musical excerpts. Bach, Beethoven, Haydn, Mozart and Handel have all featured once most years, a different aspect of their work being chosen for study each time. However, the programme also covers more 'difficult' or less-widely known composers, with weeks devoted to Rubbra, Medtner, Havergal Brian, Kapralova, and the Minimalists among others. On 2 August 2013, in honour of the station's 70th year, listeners were asked to nominate a composer who had never before been featured for a special broadcast at Christmas. The composer listeners chose was Louise Farrenc. The programme is written and presented by either Donald Macleod or Kate Molleson.

==== Classical Live ====
Two programmes formerly showcased live or recorded performances from venues across the country.

Lunchtime was from 1 to 2 pm and Afternoon continued until 5 pm, with presenters being rotated weekly for the latter programme. The live Monday edition of Lunchtime was repeated on Sunday at the same time.

From 2024, these were merged as Classical Live.

==== The Early Music Show ====
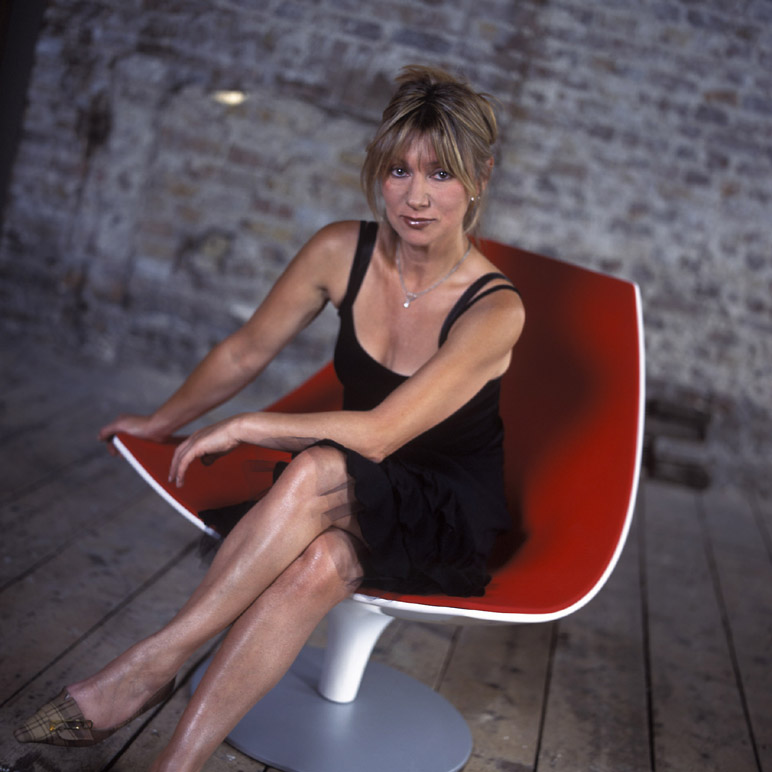
Lucie Skeaping is a regular presenter of The Early Music Show

The Early Music Show presents European music dating up to the time of Bach, broadcast at 2 pm each Sunday. Episodes cover the music, the performers, and occasional discussions of musical style. Regular presenters include Lucie Skeaping and Hannah French.

==== In Tune ====
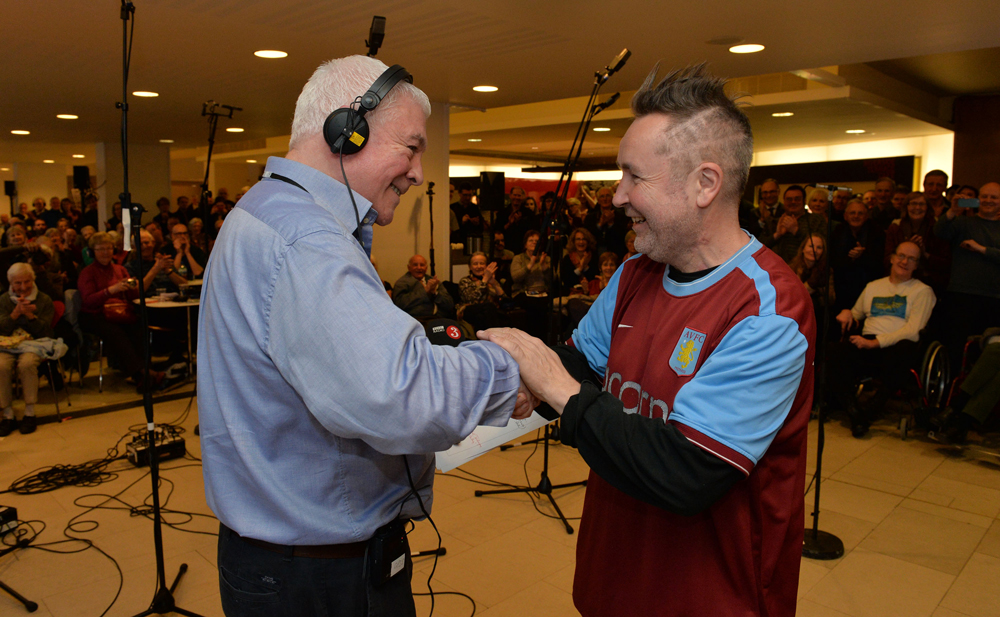
In Tune presenter Sean Rafferty with guest performer Nigel Kennedy

In Tune is "Radio 3's flagship early evening music programme". It was first broadcast on 13 July 1992 and was launched in response to the forthcoming launch of the competitor radio station Classic FM. Since 1997 the programme has been presented by Sean Rafferty and (since 2017) Katie Derham, and features a mix of live and recorded classical, jazz, folk and world music, interviews with musicians and arts news. The show is noted for its relaxed, convivial style of presentation.

==== Jazz Record Requests ====
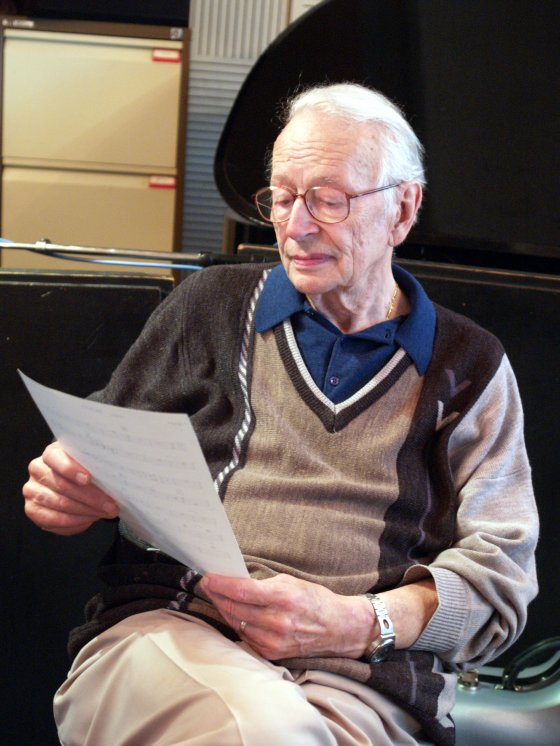
Humphrey Lyttelton introduced the first regular jazz programme in 1964

Jazz Record Requests was the first weekly jazz programme on the Third Programme. First presented by the jazz musician Humphrey Lyttelton, the 30-minute programme was launched on 12 December 1964 and is still running. Now an hour long, it was broadcast on Saturdays, usually in the late afternoon, until October 2019 when it moved to Sunday afternoon. Presenters of it on Radio 3 have included Ken Sykora, Steve Race, Peter Clayton, Charles Fox and Geoffrey Smith. Alyn Shipton became the presenter in May 2012. The most prolific requester has been Dave Taylor from Lincolnshire.

==== Opera on 3 ====
Broadcast on Saturday nights between 6 and 9:30 pm, Opera on 3 features live performances by the Metropolitan Opera from the Metropolitan Opera House in New York City.

==== The Proms ====
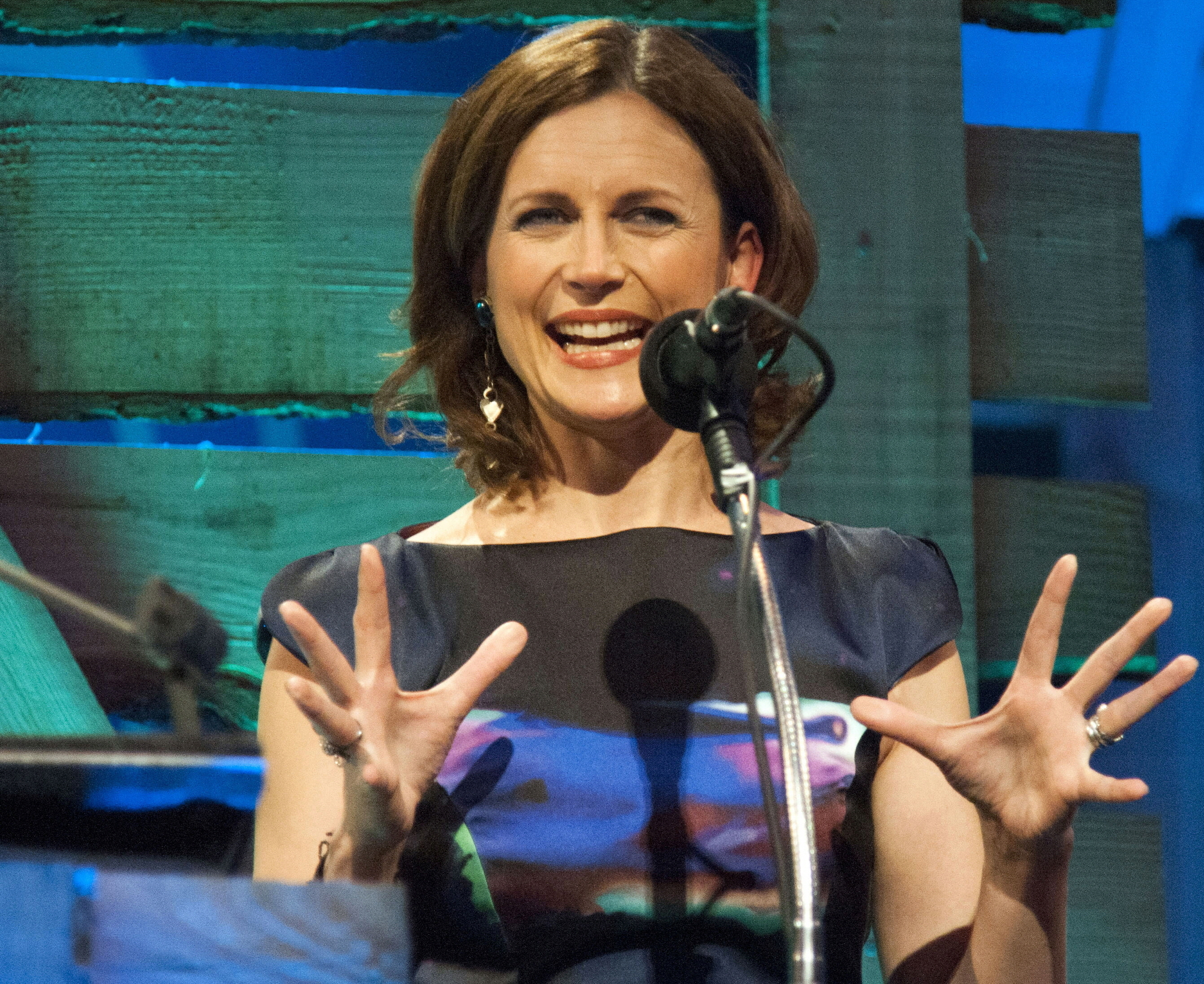
Katie Derham presents a number of programmes including In Tune and broadcasts of the Proms

The annual BBC Proms concerts are broadcast live each summer on Radio 3. Broadcasting the Proms began in 1927, when the Third Programme transmitted the Thirty-Second Season of the Promenade Concerts live from the Queen's Hall, conducted by Sir Henry Wood. The BBC's involvement with the Proms led to the creation of the BBC Symphony Orchestra and the BBC Wireless Orchestra to perform music. Television transmission began in 1947 and today, selected concerts are also simulcast on BBC Four. Promenade concerts are centred on the Royal Albert Hall with live radio broadcasts from other venues around the UK.

==== Radio 3 in Concert ====
Radio 3 in Concert (originally Live in Concert) is a weeknight programme, broadcast between 7:30 and 10 pm, with recorded concerts from various venues around the country and Europe. Regular presenters include Nicola Heywood-Thomas, Martin Handley and Petroc Trelawny. The last broadcast with the Live in Concert name was on 15 July 2015.

==== Record Review ====
Record Review is a Saturday morning programme (usually airing from 9 am to 11:45 am) dealing with recent classical music releases, topical issues and interviews. The programme title is a return of Record Review which was broadcast on Network Three occasionally from 1949, then weekly from 1957. As of October 2020 the regular presenter of Record Review is Andrew McGregor.

From 1998 to 2015 it became CD Review, until on 2 January 2016, its title reverted to Record Review to reflect the diversity of media proliferating (CDs, downloads, streaming, and so forth).

It includes the feature Building a Library which surveys and recommends available recordings of specific works.

Unclassified

Unclassified is a show hosted by Elizabeth Alker that plays experimental and ambient music. It airs at 11:30pm on a Sunday night and lasts an hour. On the show, there is sometimes a "Listening Chair" episode, where composers can come onto the show and choose a song to play. Sometimes, the show hosts a live concert, titled "Unclassified Live". The show has been played at many venues across the world, and festivals such as the Bluedot Festival at Jodrell Bank in Cheshire.

==== Through the Night ====
The show broadcasts for six hours, beginning weekdays at 0:30 and weekends at 1:00. It currently has three regular presenters: Penny Gore, John Shea, Jonathan Swain. The show is a national version of the BBC's Euroclassic Notturno.

=== Former programmes ===
==== Pied Piper ====
Pied Piper was a children's programme, presented by early music specialist, David Munrow, with the sub-title Tales and Music for Younger Listeners and ran from August 1971 until 1976. Lively and varied, it was aimed at the 6–12 age group, though much older children and adults also listened. The programme ran for five series and a total of 655 episodes until Munrow's death in May 1976.

==== The Verb ====
This show, presented by poet Ian McMillan, is described as a "cabaret of the word, featuring the best poetry, new writing and performance". It broadcast for 44 minutes at 10pm on Friday nights until March 2024, when it moved over to BBC Radio 4.

== News broadcasts ==
BBC Radio 3's remit focuses mainly on music and the arts, and news is a minor part of its output, though the station does provide concise news bulletins every half hour from 06:30 to 08:30 throughout the Breakfast programme and also at 13:00 and 18:00 to give listeners the chance to switch to a more news-oriented station should they want more details about a particular news item. Following the Delivering Quality First proposals, it was suggested that Radio 3 share bulletins with Radio 4, so that the same bulletins would be broadcast on both channels. During weekdays the 1 pm and 6 pm news bulletins are read by a member of the Radio 4 presentation team.

From 30 March until 12 July 2020 due to the COVID-19 pandemic, the Radio 3 bespoke bulletins were replaced by network news bulletins from BBC Radio 2. These were broadcast at 08:00, 13:00 and 18:00 on weekdays, and at 08:00 and 13:00 on weekends. This format came back into effect from 24 December 2020 until 4 April 2021. Since then, normal service resumed with the exception of the 5pm bulletins, which were dropped entirely.

As a result of the changes to the Radio 3 schedule that came into effect from April 2024, the Sunday 13:00 news summary was brought forward by an hour to 12:00.

== Performing groups ==
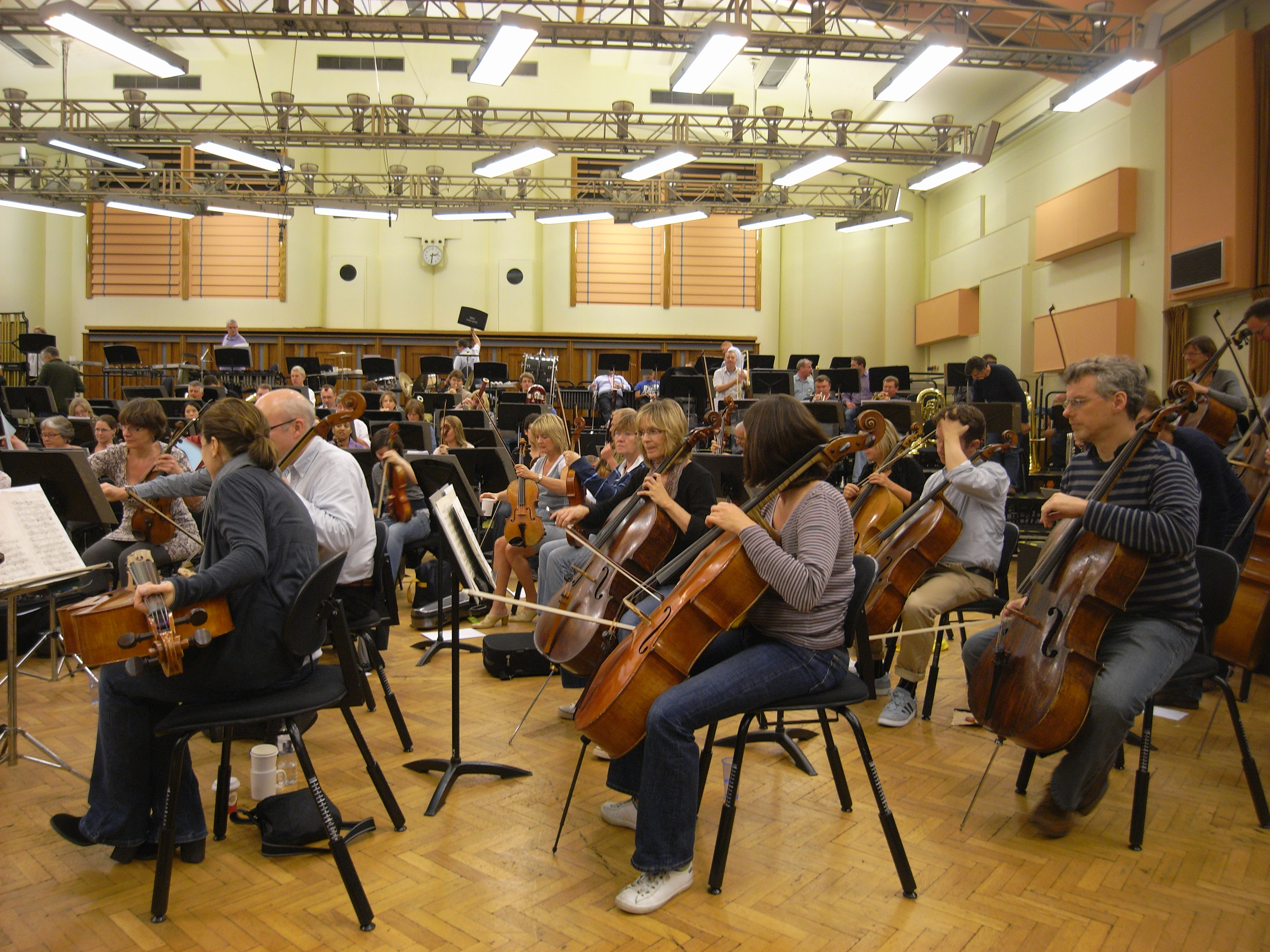
The BBC Symphony Orchestra rehearsing for the Last Night of the Proms in 2011

Much of Radio 3's orchestral output is sourced from the BBC's Orchestras and Singers. These groups are:

- The BBC Symphony Orchestra and BBC Symphony Chorus, based in London
- The BBC Concert Orchestra, based in Watford
- The BBC Philharmonic, based in Salford
- The BBC National Orchestra of Wales and the BBC National Chorus of Wales, based in Cardiff
- The BBC Scottish Symphony Orchestra, based in Glasgow
- The BBC Singers, based in London.

In addition to the BBC's own orchestras it also has broadcast commitments to the BBC Big Band, which is externally managed, and also broadcasts some works of the Ulster Orchestra, which it part funds.

== Controllers ==
- 1967–1971 Howard Newby

An author, he published four novels during his time at the Third Programme/Radio 3, winning the first Booker Prize for fiction in 1969. Oversaw the implementation of Broadcasting in the Seventies and an increase in the amount of classical music on Radio 3.

- 1972–1978 Stephen Hearst

Previously head of BBC's television music and arts department, Hearst attempted to make Radio 3 more accessible to a wider audience by introducing drivetime and request programmes as well as themed weekends. Some of these ventures were poorly viewed by critics.

- 1979–1987 Ian McIntyre

Previously controller of Radio 4, McIntyre faced budgetary cuts that closed several orchestras and uncomfortable relations with the Music Division. The possibility of future competition to Radio 3 also resulted in more programmes viewed as populist by critics in an attempt to retain listeners.

- 1987–1992 John Drummond

Previously an artistic administrator for events including the Edinburgh Festival, Drummond introduced repeats of classic drama performances and celebrations of artists anniversaries. His work also included programmes targeting fringe genres and ambitious outside broadcasts.

- 1992–1998 Nicholas Kenyon

Kenyon, previously chief music critic of The Observer, made many controversial decisions relating to accessibility to the service in light of the launch of Classic FM including new drive time programmes. However several celebrated programmes and series of programmes were launched and Radio 3 began 24-hour broadcasting.

- 1998–2014 Roger Wright

Wright attempted to ensure that all of the station's musical genres were represented more equitably, and to "smarten up" programmes. While some of these measures were recognised by the BBC and Government, the audience began to decrease, and attempts by Wright to make programmes more accessible were met with complaints from listeners. It was announced in March 2014 that Wright would step down in early September 2014.

- 2015–2023 Alan Davey

Davey became Controller in January 2015, having been chief executive of Arts Council England since 2008.

- 2023–present Sam Jackson

Jackson became controller after a career in the music industry, most recently as Executive Vice-President of Global Classics & Jazz for Universal Music Group.

== Criticisms ==
Controller Nicholas Kenyon summed up the perennial problem of Radio 3 as "the tension between highbrow culture and popular appeal …the cost of what we do and the number of people who make use of it": elitism versus populism (or 'dumbing down') and the question of cost per listener. This argument has included members of the BBC, listeners and several different protest groups.

In 1969, two hundred members of the BBC staff protested to the director general at changes which would 'emasculate' Radio 3, while managing director of radio Ian Trethowan described the station in a memorandum as "a private playground for elitists to indulge in cerebral masturbation". Later, former Radio 3 controller John Drummond complained that the senior ranks of the BBC took no interest in what he was doing.

In 1995/6 listeners and press critics protested against the introduction into a slot formerly used for Composer of the Week of a programme presented by Paul Gambaccini, a former Radio 1 and Classic FM presenter. This was seen as part of a wider move towards popularisation, to compete with Classic FM and to increase ratings. Gambaccini is quoted as saying: "I had a specific mission to invite [Radio 4's] Today listeners to stay with the BBC rather than go to Classic FM."

Several groups were formed to protest against any changes to the station. These have included:

- The Third Programme Defence Society (1957) opposed cuts in broadcasting hours and the removal of what the BBC considered "too difficult and too highbrow". Supported by TS Eliot, Ralph Vaughan Williams, Laurence Olivier
- The Campaign for Better Broadcasting (1969) opposed proposed cuts in Radio 3's speech output. Supported by Sir Adrian Boult, Jonathan Miller, Henry Moore, George Melly.
- Friends of Radio 3 (FoR3), a listeners' campaign group set up in 2003 to express concern at changes to the station's style and scheduling, including the shift to presenter-led programmes stripped through the week, as on Classic FM and other commercial music stations. Officially, the BBC stated that "the network's target audience has been redefined and broadened and the schedule began to be recast to move towards this during 1999." The group's stated aim is "To engage with the BBC, to question the policies which depart from Radio 3's remit to deliver a high quality programme of classical music, spoken arts and thought, and to convey listener concerns to BBC management." The group is supported by Dame Gillian Weir, Robin Holloway, Andrew Motion, Dame Margaret Drabble. The BBC has rejected claims that the network has 'dumbed down'.

In March 2019, more than 500 signatories including Jarvis Cocker, Shabaka Hutchings, and Norma Waterson called on the BBC "to think again about changes to its schedules", as a result of proposed cuts to specialist music programming on the station.

== See also ==
- List of BBC radio stations
